= Fungi from Yuggoth =

Sonnets by H. P. Lovecraft

Jason Eckhardt's cover for the Necronomicon Press 1993 edition

Fungi from Yuggoth is a sequence of 36 sonnets by cosmic horror writer H. P. Lovecraft. Most of the sonnets were written between 27 December 1929 – 4 January 1930; thereafter individual sonnets appeared in Weird Tales and other genre magazines. The sequence was published complete in Beyond the Wall of Sleep (Sauk City, Wisconsin: Arkham House, 1943, 395–407) and The Ancient Track: The Complete Poetical Works of H. P. Lovecraft (San Francisco: Night Shade Books, 2001, 64–79; expanded 2nd ed, NY Hippocampus Press, 2013). Ballantine Books' mass paperback edition, Fungi From Yuggoth & Other Poems (Random House, New York, 1971) included other poetic works.

The sequence has been printed in several different versions as standalone chapbooks. In June 1943, Bill Evans (Washington DC) issued a separate appearance which lacked the final three sonnets. In 1977 Necronomicon Press, (West Warwick, RI) issued the complete sequence as The Fungi from Yuggoth (475 numbered copies). This may have been the first time that the sequence was published in its corrected text. The same press went on to reissue it with new cover artwork by Jason Eckhardt in limited editions from 1982 onwards and other illustrated editions from different presses were to follow. In 2017 came a limited annotated edition of the sequence with illustrations by Jason Eckhardt for each poem (Hippocampus Press, New York). Lovecraft is known chiefly as a writer of genre fiction, several themes from which are reflected in his sonnet sequence. But the restrained style of the verse there so distinguishes it from the prose work that, in the view of some commentators, it "deserves to be more widely known and appreciated" for its own poetic merits. The work later appealed to musicians and there have been several settings of poems from it in a variety of genres.

== Style ==
Fungi from Yuggoth represents a marked departure from the mannered poems Lovecraft had been writing up to this point. Sending a copy of "Recapture" (which just predates the sequence but was later incorporated into it) the poet remarks that it is "illustrative of my efforts to practice what I preach regarding direct and unaffected diction". He also describes it as "a sort of irregular semi-sonnet, based on an actual dream". The sonnets that followed were hybrid in form insofar as they are partly based on the Petrarchan approach but invariably end with a rhyming couplet (as in the so-called Shakespearean sonnet) "contrived to provide an element of surprise in the final line".

Varying opinions have been expressed in the critical literature on Lovecraft as to whether the poems form a continuous cycle which tells a story, or whether each individual sonnet is discrete. (See essays in Bibliography below by Boerem, Ellis, Schultz, Vaughan and Waugh.) Phillip A. Ellis, in his essay "Unity in Diversity: Fungi from Yuggoth as a Unified Setting", discusses this problem and suggests a solution. S. T. Joshi considers that, apart from the first three sonnets, "the remaining poems, which HPL considered suitable for publication independent of the introductory poems, are discontinuous vignettes concerning a variety of unrelated weird themes, told in the first person and (apparently) third person. The cumulative effect is that of a series of shifting dream images."

== Themes ==
The first three poems in the sequence concern a person who obtains an ancient book of esoteric knowledge that seems to allow one to travel to parallel realities or strange parts of the universe. Later poems deal more with an atmosphere of cosmic horror, or create a mood of being shut out from former felicity, and do not have a strong narrative through-line except occasionally over a couple of sonnets (e.g. 17–18). In that the sequence starts by seeming to provide 'the key' to the author's 'vague visions' (Sonnet 3) of other realities behind the everyday, it might be argued that the poems that follow, though disparate in themselves, detail a succession of such visions that a reading of the book releases. With one or two exceptions, the concluding poems from "Expectancy" (28) onward seek to explain the circumstances of the narrator's sense of alienation within the present. Rather than visions themselves, these poems serve as a commentary on their source.

The sonnets see-saw between various themes in much the same way as do Lovecraft's short stories. There are references to the author's night terrors in "Recognition" (4), a potent source for his later fiction and carrying forward into dream poems related to his Dunsany manner; to intimations of an Elder Race on earth; and to nightmare beings from Beyond. That these themes often cross-fertilize each other is suggested by "Star Winds" (14), which taken purely by itself is an exercise in Dunsanian dream-lore. However, beginning in the month after finishing his sequence, Lovecraft set to work on his story The Whisperer in Darkness (1931) where Yuggoth is recreated as a planet of fungoid beings given the name of Mi-go. In the sonnet, the fungi sprout in a location called Yuggoth, not on an alien planet; and in its following line Nithon is described as a world with richly flowering continents rather than, as in the story, Yuggoth's occulted moon. This is a good instance of how Lovecraft gave himself license to be self-contradictory and vary his matter according to the artistic need of the moment, of which the diversity of conflicting situations within the whole sequence of sonnets is itself an example. Or, as he himself puts it in "Star Winds",

Yet for each dream these winds to us convey,
A dozen more of ours they sweep away!

In addition to The Whisperer in Darkness, the cycle references other works by Lovecraft and introduces a number of ideas that he would expand upon in later works.

- The town of Innsmouth is mentioned in sonnets VIII ("The Port") and XIX ("The Bells")
- The story told in sonnet XII ("The Howler") presages "The Dreams in the Witch House" (1932). Its description of the witch's familiar, described as "a four-pawed thing with human face," echoes the description of Brown Jenkin, a rat-like creature with a human face.
- Sonnet XV references the ancient city in his story At the Mountains of Madness (1931) and hints at the Elder Things inhabiting it.
- Sonnet XX names both the Nightgaunts from The Dream-Quest of Unknown Kadath and the Shoggoths from "At the Mountains of Madness".
- Sonnets XXI and XXII respectively are named for and concern the Outer Gods Nyarlathotep and Azathoth.
- Sonnet XXVI deals with events preceding those in "The Dunwich Horror" (1929).
- Sonnet XXVII references the Plateau of Leng, mentioned in many of Lovecraft's works, and the masked Old One from Robert W. Chambers' The King in Yellow.

== Discography ==
- Harold S. Farnese (1885–1945) set two sonnets to music, "Mirage" and "The Elder Pharos", and performed them in 1932. Sheet music was printed after Lovecraft's death. Performances were finally recorded for the Fedogan & Bremer reissue in 2015 (see below).
- Fungi From Yuggoth: A Sonnet Cycle. A reading by John Arthur with a score for synthesizer by Mike Olsen, released as a cassette in 1987 (Fedogan & Bremer, Minneapolis MN) and later on CD (2001, 2015).
- Fungi from Yuggoth, 2000. B side of the cassette Condor; a minimal electronic score based on the complete cycle.
- Fungi from Yuggoth, 2001, grunt performance of sonnets 21 and 22 to doom metal backing by Foetor
- Fungi from Yuggoth, 2004. Four songs for baritone and piano by the Greek composer Dionysis Boukouvalas.
- Fungi From Yuggoth, 2007; a reading by Colin Timothy Gagnon with keyboard accompaniment, based on a purely instrumental suite from 2001.
- Fungi from Yuggoth, 2007; a sound only album by Astrophobos
- Fungi From Yuggoth, Sweden 2009, CD and album. Eleven poems read by American musician pixyblink, set to music by the Swedish electronica composer Rhea Tucanae (Dan Söderqvist).
- Fungi from Yuggoth, 2012; reading by Paul Maclean with musical soundtrack by Allicorn.
- H.P. Lovecraft: Fungi From Yuggoth, 2012. 9 tracks of electronic interpretations on Out of Orion (OX3).
- Five Fungi From Yuggoth Songs by Richard Bellak, 2013. Art song with piano accompaniment.
- Four Lovecraftian Sonnets, by Reber Clark, 2013. An instrumental suite for French horn and violin
- Fungi from Yuggoth, a song cycle by Alexander Rossetti for soprano and chamber ensemble, first performed at Ithaca College in 2013; it was released as part of an album in 2015.
- Fungi from Yuggoth by H.P. Lovecraft, 2015. Music and narration by Bryant O'Hara.
- Fungi from Yuggoth I - V, 2015, treated sound by Italian group Liturgia Maleficarum.
- H. P. Lovecraft's Fungi from Yuggoth and Other Poems, 2016. Read by William E. Hart, with keyboard and orchestral music scored by Graham Plowman, CD: ISBN 978-1-878252-80-7, Fedogan & Bremer.
- Fungi From Yuggoth, 2017. "An exploration of the first ten sonnets" by the German metal band Terrible Old Man.
- Fungi from Yuggoth, 2017, Full cycle read by Nemesis the Warlock, with treated organ background.
- Fungi from Yuggoth, 2018. Narrated by Ian Gordon for HorrorBabble to his own minimal music background.
- Fungi from Yuggoth, 2019. "Gothic poetry" narrated by G.M. Danielson with Altrusian Grace Media's electronic background.
- I Notturni Di Yuggot, 2019. Classical guitar nocturnes by Fabio Frizzi, accompanied by readings of eight sonnets by Andrew Leman, Cadabra Records.

== Bibliography ==
- Boerem, R., "The Continuity of the Fungi from Yuggoth" in S. T. Joshi (ed.), H. P. Lovecraft: Four Decades of Criticism (Athens : Ohio University Press, 1980): 222–225.
- Boerem, R., "On the Fungi from Yuggoth" Dark Brotherhood Journal 1:1 (June 1971): 2–5.
- Bradley, Marion Zimmer, and Robert Carson, "Lovecraftian Sonnetry" Astra's Tower 2 (December 1947).
- Burleson, Donald R., "Notes on Lovecraft's 'The Bells': a Carillon" Lovecraft Studies 17 (Fall 1988): 34–35.
- Burleson, Donald R., "On Lovecraft's 'Harbour Whistles'" Crypt of Cthulhu 74 (Lammas 1990): 12–13.
- Burleson, Donald R., "Scansion Problems in Lovecraft's 'Mirage'" Lovecraft Studies 24 (Spring 1991): 18–19, 21.
- Clore, Dan, "Metonyms of Alterity: a Semiotic Interpretation of Fungi from Yuggoth" Lovecraft Studies 30 (Spring 1994): 21–32.
- Coffmann, Frank, "H.P. Lovecraft and the Fungi from Yuggoth Sonnets (part one)" Calenture 2:1 (September 2006).
- D'Ammassa, Don, ""Review"" Science Fiction Chronicle 5:7 (April 1984): 33.
- Ellis, Phillip A., "The Fungi from Yuggoth: a Concordance" Calenture 3:3 (May 2008).
- Ellis, Phillip A., "Unity in Diversity: Fungi from Yuggoth as a Unified Setting" Lovecraft Annual 1 (2007): 84–90.
- Murray, Will, "Illuminating 'The Elder Pharos'" Crypt of Cthulhu 20 (Eastertide 1984): 17–19.
- Oakes, David A., "This Is the Way the World Ends: Modernism in 'The Hollow Man' and Fungi from Yuggoth" Lovecraft Studies 40 (Fall 1998): 33–36, 28.
- Price, Robert M., "St. Toad's Hagiography" Crypt of Cthulhu 9 (Hallowmas 1982): 21.
- Price, Robert M., "St. Toad's Revisited" Crypt of Cthulhu 20 (Eastertide 1984): 21;
- Price, Robert M., "Second Thoughts on the Fungi from Yuggoth" Crypt of Cthulhu 78 (St. John's Eve 1991): 3–8.
- Schultz, David E., "H. P. Lovecraft's Fungi from Yuggoth" Crypt of Cthulhu 20 (Eastertide 1984): 3–7.
- Schultz, David E., "The Lack of Continuity in Fungi from Yuggoth" Crypt of Cthulhu 20 (Eastertide 1984): 12–16.
- Sinha-Morey, Bobbi, "Fungi: the Poetry of H.P. Lovecraft" Calenture 2:2 (January 2007).
- Vaughan, Ralph E., "The Story in Fungi from Yuggoth" Crypt of Cthulhu 20 (Eastertide 1984): 9–11.
- Waugh, Robert H., "The Structural and Thematic Unity of Fungi from Yuggoth" Lovecraft Studies 26 (Spring 1992): 2–14.
