= I, Cthulhu =

1986 short story by Neil Gaiman

- Short story by Neil Gaiman
- Country: United States
- Language: English
- Genres: Humor, Lovecraftian horror, fan fiction short story

Publication
- Published in: Dagon #16 (Jan–Feb 1987); Tor.com (2009 on)
- Media type: Print (Paperback and online)
- Publication date: 1987

"I, Cthulhu" is a short humorous story by fantasy author Neil Gaiman featuring H. P. Lovecraft's Cthulhu, who is dictating an autobiography to a human slave named Whateley. The story reveals much about Cthulhu's "birth" and early life.

Originally published by the short-lived Lovecraft fanzine Dagon in 1987, it was reprinted for free by Tor.com in December 2009. Since then, the website – as part of a general tradition celebrating Lovecraft's works over the holiday season – has reposted the story every December.

It is also available for free on Gaiman's website, under a small sampler collection of his short fiction.

== Plot ==
Narrated to his dedicated servant Whateley, Cthulhu tells the story of his birth on the planet Khhaa'yngnaiih ("No, of course I don't know how to spell it. Write it as it sounds.") to a father who was eaten by his mother and a mother who was subsequently eaten by Cthulhu himself. For a few thousand years, young Cthulhu, "the colour of a young trout and about four of your feet long", slunk through the swamps of his home planet, eating and avoiding being eaten.

Not long thereafter, Cthulhu's uncle, Hastur, suggests that they and "the boys" (fellow nameless, nightmarish horrors from the Cthulhu Mythos) go out, explore the cosmos, and have some fun. After a long argument, a plane of existence is decided upon.

After a short stint in Carcosa, Cthulhu is directed by the King in Yellow towards Earth in his search for a patch of the cosmos to rule over. Finding Earth to be rich in both swamps and cultists, Cthulhu makes himself comfortable – until the arrival of the Old Ones ("banal little bureaucruds") enforcing some kind of cosmic law, which requires Cthulhu and his followers to leave the seas and move onto land.

There, the cult of Cthulhu built monuments to their be-tentacled god, threw a planet-wide barbecue that decimated the dinosaurs, and, in spite, forced the Old Ones further and further towards the Antarctic. Hating the cold, the Old Ones retaliated by bringing Earth closer to the Sun, once again submerging Cthulhu and his monolithic city of R'lyeh beneath the sea.

This brings Cthulhu to the present day, explaining to Whateley that while he is technically "dead and dreaming" beneath the waves, watching humanity in its endless chaos, he is waiting. Waiting for the day when the stars align and he is awakened to rule over Earth once more, and once it is destroyed, he will return to his home planet. There he will mate and he will die as his own parents died, bringing forth new unspeakable horrors into the cosmos.
