= CthulhuTech =

Tabletop role-playing game

- Designers: Matthew Grau
- Publishers: Sandstorm Productions
- Publication: 2007
- Genres: Action, Science fiction, Horror
- Systems: Framewerk

CthulhuTech is a science-fiction horror roleplaying game created by Wildfire LLC and published by Sandstorm that combines elements of the Cthulhu Mythos with anime-style mecha, horror, magic and futuristic action. The setting is Earth in 2085 during a worldwide conflict known as the Aeon War, (from the Necronomicon quote: "And with strange aeons even death may die") wherein the planet has been invaded twice: once by a black-skinned manufactured alien race known as the Nazzadi who are derived from humans and who join forces with them, and then a second time by the Mi-Go, an advanced alien civilization seemingly bent on the enslavement of humanity. Aside from these conflicts, the game focuses on other factions, such as ancient cults like the Esoteric Order of Dagon that are running amok across the planet and the eldritch horrors that are rising to destroy the world as, according to the prophecies of the Cthulhu Mythos, the "stars are right" and the Great Old Ones and their servitors are returning/reawakening to reclaim the Earth. The game uses a proprietary ten-sided die (d10) system titled "Framewerk."

== History ==
Game designer Matthew Grau envisioned CthulhuTech while in The Dreaming, a store owned by Aron Anderson, when Grau realized that there had never been a game that combined the concepts of anime-style mecha and Cthulhu. CthulhuTech combines the concepts of magic, mecha and the Cthulhu Mythos, in a science-fiction game in which mankind must fight a war against alien races such as the mi-go and others. Eos Press announced in September 2003 their intentions to publish the game CthulhuTech and that its Framewerk system would be the new house rules system for Eos Press; however, Eos ultimately prioritized their licensed Weapons of the Gods role-playing game rather than the new game CthulhuTech, so Grau took his game first to Osseum Entertainment and then to Mongoose Publishing. Cthulhutech (2007) was published through the Flaming Cobra imprint of Mongoose. Mongoose encountered printing problems in 2007–2008, so while the first printing of CthulhuTech was printed in full-color as WildFire wanted, its second printing (2008) and supplement Dark Passions (2008) were both printed in black and white. Mongoose was unable to publish the full-color books that Wildfire wanted, so Wildfire brought the game to Catalyst Game Labs. CthulhuTech was the first acquisition by Catalyst Game Labs after they picked up the FASA games Battletech and Shadowrun in 2007. Catalyst was able to quickly publish five full-color hardcover books just as WildFire wanted – CthulhuTech (2008); Dark Passions (2008); Vade Mecum: The CthulhuTech Companion (2008); Damnation View (2009); and Mortal Remains (2009). After working with Catalyst, Grau brought CthulhuTech to Sandstorm Productions.

== Game overview ==
CthulhuTech uses a proprietary game system known as "Framewerk" that focuses on a dice pool system. An unusual feature is the selection of numbers from the d10 rolls – a player can pick a single highest number, all like numbers, or straights of consecutive numbers, and use these to generate the result. The result is then added to a "base" consisting of a related attribute score bought by the player at character creation. The sum of the base and the result is then compared to target numbers or to the results of an opponent's rolls to determine success or failure.

Players build characters using points to buy six attributes, Strength, Agility, Perception, Intellect, Tenacity, and Presence, which are used for attribute tests and serve as the base to which roll results for skills are added. Players have another, separate pool of points used to buy skills such as "Marksman" or "Persuade" in five degrees of competency. These levels of competency determine the size of the player's dice pool. Players can also use their points to purchase Assets, including wealth, status, and allies that are beneficial in the game. They can also select Drawbacks, such as poverty or sickness, that will give them extra points to spend at the cost of suffering an ill effect, either as a direct penalty, or as part of the storyline.

Though the character generation is not class-based, there are "Profession" templates that guide players in building characters suitable for the setting, and include prerequisites to join the many factions. For example, the level of devotion and training required to become a Mecha Pilot is explained in its Profession template. Professions still allow the player to build a unique character despite this.

When rolling, players can make use of "Drama Points," which affect die rolls. One drama point spent can remove a die from an opponent's pool or increase their own pool by one die. Players have ten drama points which are restored every game session (loosely defined as being each time the players get together to play). Despite this being a feature suited mostly to players, important Non-Player Characters also possess drama points to make them tougher or represent their importance.

A major element of CthulhuTech is fear and insanity. All alien monstrosities have a fear factor that forces a Tenacity roll – should the player fail, he or she will be scared or panicked by the presence of the monster, which may have scarring effects on the character's psyche. As well, coming into contact with aliens and demons, performing sorcery, utilizing psychic abilities, or witnessing horrible events, could lead players to gain points of Insanity. These can be opposed with Tenacity rolls as well. Should a player gain enough insanity points, the character will suffer psychological trauma, including common mental illnesses such as schizophrenia. If a player gains too many points of insanity, the character will be forced out of the game – but can recover with proper psychological attention over a period of time.

== Game setting ==
The CthulhuTech corebook is set on Earth in 2085, during a war known as the "Aeon War," against aliens and cultists with varying goals. Due to the Aeon War, the political layout of the world has changed greatly. The remainder of the civilized world has joined forces to create the New Earth Government, comprising mainly Western Europe, China, Japan, Australia, Africa, and the Americas. Vast swathes of Asian and European territory have been destroyed by the rapidly expanding Rapine Storm, a cult of crazed psychopaths and cannibals who ravage the land in hordes of armed men and terrifying alien beasts. Antarctica, Alaska, and Northern Europe have fallen under the control of the Mi-Go aliens and their advanced technological war machine. All of the oceans and most of the coasts of the world are sparsely controlled by the Esoteric Order of Dagon, who use sea beasts, monstrous Deep Ones and Hybrid soldiers, brainwashed or conscripted humans, and their own brand of oceanic mecha in their search for R'lyeh, the lost underwater city of Cthulhu.

Players can choose from two player races in the Core Rulebook. Aside from Humans, a player can choose to play as the alien Nazzadi, genetically engineered humans once under the influence of the Mi-Go but now allied with the Earth's government. The Nazzadi are depicted as dark skinned humans with intricate tattoos. The CthulhuTech companion book Vade Mecum introduced three new playable races, two of which are results of Nazzadi and Human coupling and are referred to as "Xenomixes." The third is the monstrous "Ghoul," a race of filthy and only vaguely humanoid creatures that hide within human civilization, disguising themselves as homeless people or living in sewers and tunnels.

Factions include the "Tagers," a group of warriors who work for the mysterious Eldritch Society and bond with alien symbionts that produce alien-like suits of flesh over their bodies, giving them enhanced strength and other abilities. Tagers combat the powerful and nearly all-encompassing Chrysalis Corporation, a front for a terrible cult known as the Children of Chaos, who worship Nyarlahotep, and create shapeshifting super soldiers called "Dhohanoids" to accomplish their ends. "The New Earth Government" is the most encompassing faction, with numerous government agencies, military powers, and all of the world's remaining nations under its command. NEG players will fight the cults and the alien Mi-Go using mecha and military technology out in the battlefields or sorcery, wits, and investigative ability in the futuristic urban arcologies. The players can also, if they choose, ally themselves with the Chrysalis Corporation and other evil cults.

== Inspirations ==
CthulhuTech is inspired by various anime such as Robotech, The Guyver and Neon Genesis Evangelion, and by cyberpunk games like Shadowrun. The core inspiration is drawn from the works of HP Lovecraft and others. A few Mythos elements have been extrapolated into a futuristic setting, such as monstrous Ghouls and Byakhee, the alien Mi-Go, as well as Lovecraftian deities such as Cthulhu and Hastur.

Despite the use of races and deities created by Lovecraft and others, there is little to connect the game with the Lovecraftian style of horror; the game is more action oriented. While prominent elements of the Mythos described in some of Lovecraft's key works (such as Elder Things, Shoggoths or Yithians) are not used as NPCs or enemies and generally do not appear in the game, they are referenced in a section of the CthulhuTech Core Rulebook describing the background of the setting and intended for gamemasters. Notably, while the game itself is very loosely based on the Mythos and the aspects integrated into gameplay are extensively reimagined, the background section closely follows Mythos canon and is fairly accurate.

The setting features futuristic elements such as the architecturally efficient and futuristic arcologies, powered armor and mecha, energy weapons, and bio and nano-technology. In addition, the setting also includes many paranormal or fantastic elements, such as dangerous sorcery and psychic abilities, which take a toll on the sanity of the user, and the Arcanotechnology, a paranormal technology that produces near-endless amounts of efficient and clean fuel.

== Reception ==
CthulhuTech has received varying degrees of acknowledgment.

=== Reviews ===
Io9 featured a short review of Vade Mecum, the CthulhuTech companion book. The reviewer referred to the artwork as "amazing, really helping to evoke the gloomy, decadent world of CthulhuTech" and recommended the book for those who are looking for a dark RPG.

Hyperion, the largest Norwegian website for roleplaying and LARP, featured a review of CthulhuTech. The reviewer applauds CthulhuTech for its fresh setting and the wide variety of stories it can support, saying it might become a "cult symbol" among games. The reviewer also goes through Framewerk, finding it easy to pick up, especially for those with experience in the White Wolf Storytelling System. However, he also goes on to say that some of the skills are similar and might confuse beginners, and that it lacks information on the technology of the setting, requiring more supplements to make it whole.

Other reviews:

- Rebel Times #5

CthulhuTech was featured in Yog-Sothoth.com's semi-regular "Yog Radio" podcast, #28, in an interview with the game's authors.

=== Awards and honors ===
CthulhuTech was a finalist for the 34th Origins Awards, an award for particular aspects of the traditional gaming industry. It was nominated in the "Roleplaying Game" category for 2008 and was selected as a silver award finalist, though it did not win the category. The winner was Aces & Eights . CthulhuTech was also a finalist for the 2009 ENnie awards for "Best Game", "Best Production Values", "Best Interior Art", "Best Supplement", and "Best Cover Art". For those categories it won Gold ENnie awards for "Best Cover Art" (Core Rule Book) and "Best Supplement" (Vade Mecum).

== Publication history ==
The first publisher of CthulhuTech was EOS Press. This was followed by Mongoose Publishing (a relationship which ended amicably) and Catalyst Game Labs, which ended in April 2010 due primarily to non-payment of royalties. Sandstorm Productions followed in June 2010, but collapsed in early 2012, after which Wildfire was independent.

Books in the CthulhuTech game line currently include (original publisher in brackets):

- CthulhuTech (Mongoose) core book
- Vade Mecum (Mongoose) the CthulhuTech companion which details para-psychics, zoners, additional spells and mecha for various factions
- Dark Passions (Mongoose - black and white; Catalyst - color version) a sourcebook for cults
- Damnation View (Catalyst) a metaplot sourcebook for 2086
- Mortal Remains (Catalyst) details culture, society of the New Earth Government, and their enemies, the Migou
- Ancient Enemies (Sandstorm) details the struggle between the Tagers of the Eldritch Society and the Chrysalis Corporation
- Unveiled Threats (Sandstorm) details the armaments, devices and technology of the Strange Aeon
- Burning Horizon (Wildfire) a metaplot sourcebook for 2087
- Dead Gods - Release date has not been established but the book was pushed at the end of the "production line"

Translations of CthulhuTech into Italian, Spanish and French are in the works. The Spanish edition of CthulhuTech is being published by Edge Entertainment in Spain. The French edition of CthulhuTech is being published by La Bibliothèque Interdite in France.
