= List of Cthulhu Mythos deities =

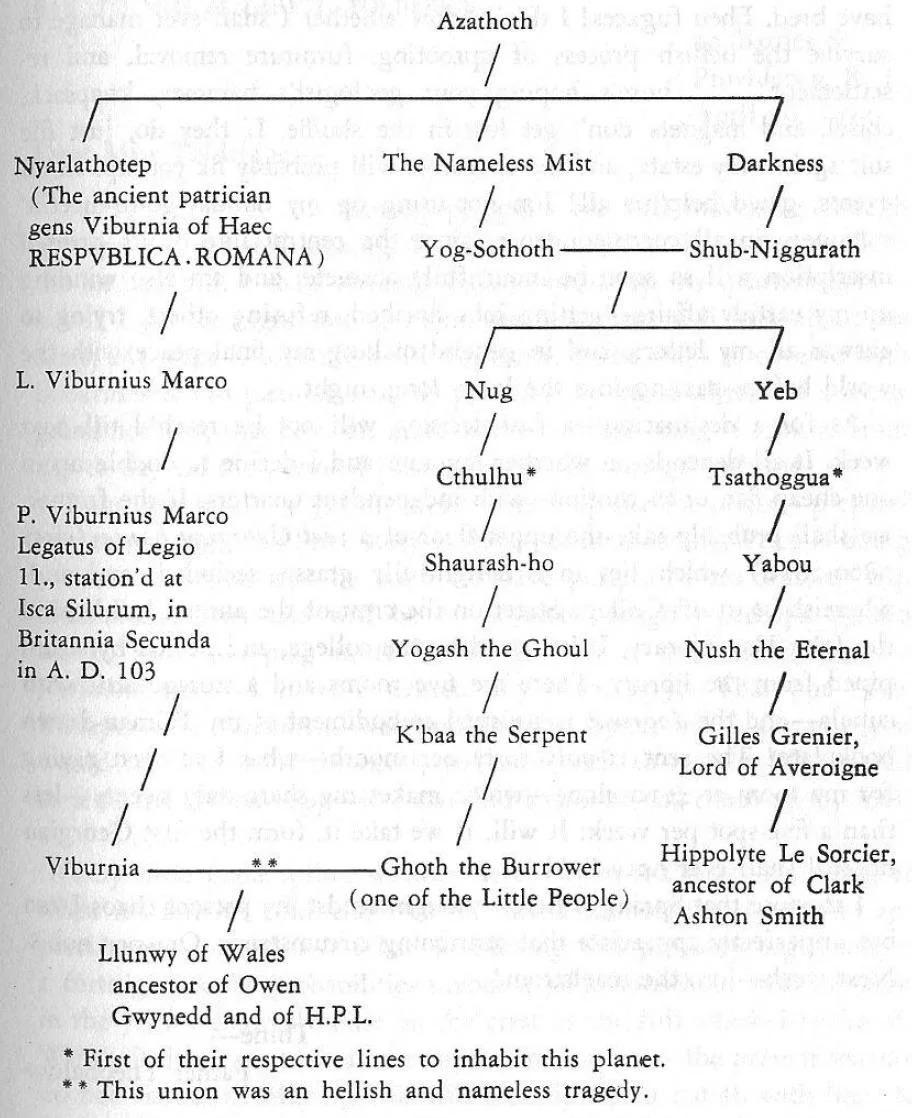
Genealogy of Cthulhu Mythos (1933)

Cthulhu Mythos deities are a group of fictional deities created by American author H. P. Lovecraft (1890–1937), and later expanded by others in the fictional universe known as the Cthulhu Mythos.

These entities are usually depicted as immensely powerful and utterly indifferent to humans. Humans can barely begin to comprehend them; however, some entities are worshipped by humans. These deities include the "Great Old Ones" and extraterrestrials, such as the "Elder Things", with sporadic references to other miscellaneous deities (e.g. Nodens). The "Elder Gods" are a later creation of other prolific writers who expanded on Lovecraft's concepts, such as August Derleth and Lin Carter, who was credited with formalizing the Cthulhu Mythos. Some of these deities were Lovecraft's original creations, but he also adapted words or concepts from earlier writers, such as Ambrose Bierce, Robert W. Chambers, Arthur Machen, and Lord Dunsany. And later writers have continued to create many deities based on Lovecraft’s concepts, further expanding his fictional universe.

== Great Old Ones ==
A recurring theme in Lovecraft's work is the complete irrelevance of humanity in the face of the cosmic horrors that exist in the universe, with Lovecraft constantly referring to the "Great Old Ones" (also known as the "Ancient Ones" or simply the "Old Ones"): a loose pantheon of ancient, powerful deities from space who once ruled the Earth and who have since fallen into a death-like sleep.

They are said to know "all that was occurring in the universe" and have existed through the "infinities of chaos" to the "first men", and they have the ability to mold the dreams and minds of men to their need. However, the extent of their knowledge and the scope of their influence and ability vary from deity to deity. Some deities are younger, and some deities are weaker than others. Even when the stars are not aligned and they are not "alive", they are never truly dead, and they are not made of standard matter. In other words, in principle, they are forever immortal and cannot be truly slain entities. This is also expressed in the famous couplet:

That is not dead which can eternal lie,

And with strange aeons even death may die.

— Abdul Alhazred, in Howard Phillips Lovecraft, The Nameless City

They have the ability to travel from planet to planet when they are awoken. On the other hand, Albert N. Wilmarth describes the spaces that the beings inhabit as beyond human imagination, and says that the universe comprehended by humans is only a speck in the totality of the cosmos:

But Yuggoth, of course, is only the stepping-stone. The main body of the beings inhabits strangely organised abysses wholly beyond the utmost reach of any human imagination. The space-time globule which we recognise as the totality of all cosmic entity, is only an atom in the genuine infinity which is theirs.

Lovecraft named several of these deities, including Cthulhu, Ghatanothoa, and Yig. With a few exceptions, this loose pantheon apparently exists outside of normal space-time. Although worshipped by deranged human (and inhuman) cults, these beings are generally imprisoned or restricted in their ability to interact with most people (beneath the sea, inside the Earth, in other dimensions, and so on), at least until the hapless protagonist is unwittingly exposed to them. Lovecraft visited this premise in many of his stories, notably his 1928 short story, "The Call of Cthulhu", with reference to the eponymous creature. However, it was Derleth who applied the notion to all of the Great Old Ones. The majority of these have physical forms that the human mind is incapable of processing; simply viewing them renders the viewer incurably insane.

Many authors and creators of works since August Derleth have regarded the Great Old Ones as "Evil and Malevolent deities" that pose a threat to humans, and have portrayed them as gods who stand in opposition to the Elder Gods. This trend is particularly evident in the Cthulhu Mythos in popular culture, and they often appear as villains in young adult novels, comics, and games inspired by Lovecraftian horror. However, unlike the evil deities of other mythologies, they are utterly indifferent to humans and other species—with very few exceptions, such as fanatic and extremely powerful worshippers—and scarcely ever respond to their worship. To be more precise, they are essential awfulness. They are simply far beyond human conceptions of morality and cannot be measured by the standards of good and evil. Deities that are clearly malicious in intent are limited to a few, such as Nyarlathotep and Y'golonac. Although they have their own sense of purpose and emotions, the scope and scale of these differ greatly from those of humanity.
On the other hand, not all of the Great Old Ones are constantly bringing disaster upon humans. Yig usually bestows blessings upon his worshippers. Tsathoggua is considered less evil than the other Great Old Ones, and Juk-Shabb is considered one of the least malevolent among the Great Old Ones. Mordiggian seems neutral until humans take the corpse away or bring it back to life. Furthermore, it was believed in the works that there are deities who stand on the side of humans such as not only Yig, but also Nug and Yeb, and Shub-Niggurath. However, this does not mean that such deities are compassionate. Although they pose a relatively low threat to humans (compared to other Great Old Ones), they are by no means friendly toward humans and often attack them.

Chaosium's Call of Cthulhu role-playing game has reclassified the deities previously known as the Great Old Ones into two categories: the "Outer Gods" and the "Great Old Ones". The "Outer Gods" category is a newly created classification comprising particularly powerful and abstract cosmic deities. Consequently, the Great Old Ones came to be regarded not as deities in the true sense, but as god-like and immensely powerful entities possessing supernatural powers and attributes (however, in a broad sense, they are still classified as deities). In fact, most Great Old Ones are limited by their physical bodies and may sometimes sustain damage to them. However, as mentioned earlier, these bodies are not made of standard matter, and even if defeated, they can reform their bodies on their own.

Lin Carter created a classification referring to powerful beings known as the "Lesser Old Ones" (also known as Greater Servitors) who serve the Great Old Ones and command the races that serve them. While their power far exceeds that of ordinary creatures and they are biologically immortal, it falls far short of that of the deities. While most are not considered deities, rather beings that are both the origin of their races and something between deity and creature. However, Bokrug and Rlim Shaikorth are also regarded as secondary Great Old Ones. Notable examples include Father Dagon and Mother Hydra, Fthaggua, and Ubb. Especially, Fthaggua and Ubb may have the potential to evolve into the Old Ones in the far future.

In Chaosium's Call of Cthulhu role-playing game, the term "Lesser Old Ones" is used different meanings to refer to deities in the process of developing into Great Old Ones (such as Nctosa and Nctolhu) or lower-ranked among the Great Old Ones (such as Han and M'nagalah) or secondary deities to the Great Old Ones (such as Pharol, Saaitii, Sebek, and Yegg-Ha). Additionally, in this setting, deities that are even more undeveloped and immature than the Lesser Old Ones are defined as the Larvae of the Great Old Ones (such as Ghadamon and Dho-Spawn).

=== Elemental ===
August Derleth, Lin Carter, and Francis T. Laney attempted to classify the Great Old Ones into the four classical elements: Earth, Water, Air, and Fire. They also created a setting in which Water and Air are opposed to each other, and Fire and Earth are also opposed to each other. In this classification, while there was general agreement that Cthulhu is the leader of Water, Hastur of Air, and Cthugha of Fire. These three deities possess the strongest power even among the Great Old Ones. However, the setting for Earth was inconsistent. Initially, Nyarlathotep or Shub-Niggurath or Yog-Sothoth were considered the leader of Earth. But later, as multiple Great Old Ones—including these three deities and Azathoth—were classified under the fifth element, Aether (Aethyr), and this setting was reinforced by the introduction of the "Outer God" classification in Chaosium's Call of Cthulhu role-playing game. That resulted in Earth has now shifted to be a miscellaneous group of deities, primarily Tsathoggua.

However, there was opposition to this elements concept itself on the grounds that it diluted Lovecraftian horror, and there was also criticism regarding the elemental classification, citing a lack of evidence and consistency with settings.

Consequently, the use of elemental classification has declined in recent years, and it is rarely seen. However, in the Cthulhu Mythos in popular culture, parts of this setting are still in use: the elemental classifications of Cthulhu, Hastur, Cthugha, and their servant or offspring deities (these are particularly evident in young adult novels, comics, and games).
Aside from that, the conflicts between Cthulhu and Hastur and between Cthugha and Nyarlathotep are still often used in the works (conflict relationships are sometimes used, except for elemental classification).

The deities belonging to each element are listed in the table below.

Elemental classification of the deities
Air	Earth	Fire	Water	Aethyr *
Hastur; Ithaqua; Rhan-Tegoth; Zhar and Lloigor	Tsathoggua; Cyäegha; Han; Nug and Yeb; Nyogtha; Yig	Cthugha; Aphoom-Zhah	Cthulhu; Dagon; Ghatanothoa*; Mother Hydra; Mnomquah; Othuum; Ythogtha; Zoth-Ommog (see also offspring and mates of Cthulhu, and Xothic legend cycle)	Azathoth; Nyarlathotep; Shub-Niggurath; Yog-Sothoth
* Also considered Earth

== Great Ones ==
The so-called "gods" of the Dreamlands, the "Great Ones" are not as powerful as the Great Old Ones. Intelligent humans might even be able to surpass the Great Ones (however, recently, they are often described as entities revered by the people of Dreamlands and, while considered weak among the gods, are generally regarded as entities of a higher order than species and creatures, including humans). In fact, each of them possesses powerful magic or abilities unique to them.

The Great Ones usually rule Earth’s Dreamlands and protected by the Outer Gods (also known as Other Gods), particularly Nyarlathotep. They move through the air as if walking on the ground and can even travel between dimensions to reach their destinations quickly. While they can enter the waking world, their powers are restricted there; if they are killed, they are resurrected in the Dreamlands and are subsequently unable to return to the waking world until they are summoned or receive Nyarlathotep’s permission. The Great Ones are forbidden to interfere in the real world too often, and if they do so too frequently, they risk being destroyed by Nyarlathotep. Only Lilith is exempt from this restriction.

The Great Ones are currently worshipped in Earth's Dreamlands. They tend to be benevolent toward humans and sometimes bestow blessings upon those who worship them. Many of them resemble humans in appearance. They are also said to tend to have narrow, elongated eyes, long, slit-like ears, slender noses, and pointed chins. In the past, the Great Ones often married human women, so many human inhabitants of the Dreamlands have Great Ones blood in them. For these reasons, the Great Ones are generally considered to have a benevolent disposition toward humans.

While they once lived on peaks across the world, they were driven off lower mountains by the spread of humanity until they had to leave Earth entirely, leaving only a mark on Mount Ngranek. The Great Ones now rule from their hidden fortress of Kadath, whose location in time and space is unknown. As well as occasionally returning to white capped Thurai, Lerion and Hatheg-Kla on cloud ships under the cover of a light mist, they abandoned Kadath for a brief period for the "sunset city" that Randolph Carter conjured in his dreams.

In some cases, a distinction is made between the Great Ones and the gods worshipped only in specific regions of Dreamlands (also known as the Lesser Dreamlands Deities, with Oukranos and Yop cited as prime examples).

The term "Gods of Earth" is often used to mean the same as "Great Ones," but sometimes in a broader sense.

In a broader sense, Gods of Earth includes not only the Great Ones but also non-evil deities that were worshipped in the real world (including many mythological deities, such as some deities from ancient Roman, Egyptian, and Greek mythology; however, the principal or supreme deities, and deities still worshipped today (such as Japanese, Hindu, and part of Buddhist deities), are generally classified as Elder Gods). Furthermore, deities appearing in settings, such as Hyperborea and Zothique, created by authors such as Clark Ashton Smith, and in setting Theem'hdra, created by author Brian Lamley, are also included in this category, provided they are not considered evil.

This category also includes non-evil deities considered to be local deities and guardian deities of the land (such as Herpete, the guardian goddess of ancient Crete and daughter of Yig, as described by Stanley C. Sargent), and Koth, the benevolent god of dreams.

Some writers regarded deities now considered Elder Gods as Gods of Earth. In this setting, it was believed that they had somehow managed to seal away the sleeping Great Old Ones and were trying to keep them sealed.

=== Ariel ===
Ariel is a god who appears in Dreamlands in the form of a human. This god is Truth itself, emitting an uncertain, white, dazzling light. He is worshipped by a small number of those who love the truth. He also sometimes acts as a messenger for the Great Ones.

=== Hagarg Ryonis ===
Hagarg Ryonis (The Lier-in-Wait) is one of the Great Ones, the gods of Earth that reside in Kadath. She appears as a huge reptilian monster. While she is sometimes regarded as the goddess of murder and evil, a more widely accepted view holds her to be a guardian deity of the home and an enforcer of justice. Although she inflicts slaughter and demands repentance when human wickedness and depravity exceed all bounds, she also saves people from demons. (H. P. Lovecraft's Dreamlands, "Wizards of Hyperborea")

=== Herpete ===
Herpete is the guardian goddess of ancient Crete and Yig's daughter. She dwells within the body of a priestess and, when matters of great importance concerning the island’s fate arise, delivers oracles to the king through the priestess’s voice.

=== Karakal ===
Karakal (Karakal of Flames) is one of the Great Ones, the gods of Earth that reside in Kadath. He might also be the same being as Zo-Kalar. However, they are generally treated as independent entities. He appears as a naked man smiling while his upper body is engulfed in raging flames. From time to time, he leaves Kadath and travels incognito through Dreamlands. (H. P. Lovecraft's Dreamlands, "Wizards of Hyperborea", Mike Minnis' "The Crawler of Pnoth")

=== Koth ===
Koth is a benevolent god of the enigmatic Dreamlands. While Robert E. Howard’s works merely mentioned his name as a forgotten god alongside those of Cthulhu and Yog-Sothoth, Lin Carter later portrayed him as a gentle god who presides over dreams and has a connection to Hypnos.

=== Lobon ===
Lobon (Lobon of the Sacred Spear) is one of the Great Ones, the gods of Earth that reside in Kadath. He appears as an ivy-crowned youth bearing a spear. He was originally worshipped in Sarnath. He avoids conflict; if attacked, he retreats, and if necessary, he either neutralizes his enemies by dispelling their magical power with a beam or defends himself with his spear. ("The Doom That Came to Sarnath"; H.P. Lovecraft's Dreamlands, John Fultz's "Wizards of Hyperborea")

=== Nasht and Kaman-Thah ===
Nasht and Kaman-Thah are bearded priests clad in pshent who guard the cave temple where pillars of flame blaze, and they are the first to guide the Dreamer. They are generally considered to be priests, but in rare cases, they are regarded as two of the gods of Dreamlands.

=== Nath-Horthath ===
Nath-Horthath is known as one of the chief gods of Celephaïs. He is the god of valor and vengeance, and is always depicted as a blond-haired man with silver eyes and jet-black skin riding a horse, always accompanied by a divine lion with him. ("Celephaïs", The Dream-Quest of Unknown Kadath; H. P. Lovecraft's Dreamlands, "Kadath/The Vision and the Journey")

=== Oukranos ===
Oukranos is one of the Lesser Dreamlands Deities, the gods of Earth that reside in Kadath. He is the god of the Oukranos River and wields power over it. (The Dream-Quest of Unknown Kadath)

=== Robigus ===
Robigus is a fungal deity worshipped in ancient Rome. He now resides in the Fungis Forest of Dreamlands, where he is said to welcome human visitors. However, if a human behaves rudely, he will turn that person into a mushroom.

=== Tamash ===
Tamash is a Great One dwelling on Kadath. Tamash was one of the chief gods worshipped in doomed Sarnath along with Zo-Kalar and Lobon. His skin is silver, his hair jet-black. He wears a robe woven with gold thread, holds a lapis lazuli staff in his hand, and wears a laurel wreath. He is a master of illusions. ("The Doom That Came to Sarnath;" H. P. Lovecraft's Dreamlands, "Wizards of Hyperborea")

=== Yop ===
Yop is one of the Lesser Dreamlands Deities, the personal god of Yha-Vho, an idol sculptor who lives in the Dreamlands. He created this god from diorite with his own hands. This god bestows a blessing that greatly enhances the skills needed to create sacred idols.

=== Zo-Kalar ===
Zo-Kalar is a Great One dwelling on Kadath. Zo-Kalar was one of the chief gods worshipped in doomed Sarnath along with Tamash and Lobon. (HPL: "The Doom That Came to Sarnath"). He is also the leader who unites Tamash and Lobon. It is also possibly the same being as Karakal or Karakal of Flames. However, they are generally treated as independent entities. He is tall and has a ghostly, pale appearance, except for his jet-black eyes. He is the god who presides over birth and death. He doesn't much like the living and avoids interacting with them unless he has to. ("The Doom That Came to Sarnath"; "Wizards of Hyperborea")

=== List of other Gods of Earth ===
Below are the tables listing the other Gods of Earth not mentioned above.

==== Real-world religious and Dreamlands Deities ====
Gods that are considered to be Elder Gods are listed under "Elder Gods".

Real-world religious and Dreamlands Deities
Name	Alias	Explanation
Blaalador	Insect god	The God of the Giant Dung Beetles in the city of Dreamlands.
Circe		A goddess or a powerful witch from Greek mythology.
Helios		The Sun God in Greek Mythology.
Māui		A folk hero-god in Polynesian mythology who is believed to have created the islands.
Meretseger	She Who Loves Silence	A guardian deity of tombs and pyramids in Egyptian mythology. In the Cthulhu Mythos, she is considered a guardian goddess of the Sleep of the Pharaohs, who was born to Yig and a priestess.
Muses	An inspiration to All	The kind goddesses of Greek mythology who preside over the arts, including scholarship, literature, the visual arts, and music.
Nekhbet	Queen of the Vultures	A local guardian goddess in Egyptian mythology, also considered the queen of vultures. She has lost her powers and her memories and is now living as a human woman. However, she eats corpses (though she does not actively kill unless the person poses a threat to her).
Nemesis	Goddess of Divine Retribution	A goddess from Greek mythology who presides over justice, retribution, and revenge. And she now lives in Dreamlands.
Oceanus		The Greek mythology god of the sea and ocean currents.
Saturn	Cronus	The father god of agriculture in Greek and Roman mythology.

==== Hyperborea Deities ====
Hyperborea Deities
Name	Alias	Explanation
Kathatana		An ancient minor deity worshipped in Hyperborea that exudes an acidic liquid.
Kathruale		A fairy deity once worshipped in Hyperborea, but who was banished by Yhoundeh.
Leniqua	The moon goddess	The moon goddess once worshipped in Hyperborea.
Phauz	Woman-breasted cat-goddess	A cat goddess once worshipped in Hyperborea.
Qualk	The fish-like minor god	The fish-like minor god was once worshipped in Hyperborea, but was banished by Yhoundeh.
Shimba		The merciful and gentle shepherd god of Hyperborea.
Zarbanoth		A mysterious animal deity once worshipped in Hyperborea.

==== Theem'hdra Deities ====
Theem'hdra Deities
Name	Alias	Explanation
Ahorra Izz	Scorpion god	The god of all scorpions, who takes the form of a scarlet stone statue of a giant scorpion—about half the height of a human—with enormous ruby eyes. He interacts with and helps humans, but he punishes those who harm scorpions or steal his rubies.
Baroom	God of the Avalanche	The god of Avalanches, whose name is often chanted at grand feasts in the northern lands.
Cthon		A god said to dwell at the edge of the world and capture the sun with a net.
Shoosh	Goddess of the Still Slumbers	The goddess who leads to peaceful sleep.
Lords of the Morass	Great Slug-gods	Gods in the form of slugs as huge as mammoths. They have a constitution that causes their personalities and intelligence to change depending on what they eat, and they are gentle gods.
Mam	Mother of Gods	The goddess said to be the mother of these gods.

==== Zothique Deities ====
Zothique Deities
Name	Alias	Explanation
Geol	Terrestrial god	Chief deity of the capital city of Aramoam. He looks like a huge, overweight man.
Ililot	Goddess of love	The goddess of love and blood, worshipped throughout Zothique.
Moon-God		This god has a temple in Faraad, capital of Yoros, formerly known for its wealth, especially in books of magic.
Ojhal	Virgin goddess	She is a virgin goddess with a stern disposition who is served by celibate priests.
Ummos		The god of merchants in Zothique.
Yuckla	The small and grotesque god of laughter	The god of laughter, who is believed to be compassionate and to exert a certain degree of protective influence.

==== other Gods of Earth ====
other Gods of Earth
Name	Alias	Explanation
Bel-Mazzadon		The austerity-practicing deity worshiped as the chief deity by a small religious group.
Kallak		The creation god of the indigenous people of an island near ancient Rome.
Phthathnee	Virgin goddess	The goddess widely worshiped as the virgin goddess.
Saag Nosha		The god with the head of a toad and the body of a fat man.
Shebaree		The goddess of harlots and also of the spring.
Zelphon and Zelphaz		The Gods of Phthathnee's twin sons.
Zeukadon		The god who fires a powerful beam of light strong enough to completely obliterate a building.
Zomath	God of poetics and of knowledge, but also of the righteous sword	A god worshipped by the residents of the ancient city of Touk-it. He has silvery-gray hair and a beard that reaches all the way to the starry sky.

== Outer Gods ==
As it is known in the Mythos, the "Outer Gods" are ruled by Azathoth, the "Blind Idiot God," who holds court at the center of infinity. A group of Outer Gods dances rhythmically around Azathoth, in cadence to the piping of a demonic flute. The Outer Gods present at Azathoth's court are the entities called "Ultimate Gods" in The Dream-Quest of Unknown Kadath. Yog-Sothoth, the "All-in-One and One-in-All", rules as a viceroy or co-rules with Azathoth and exists as the incarnation of all space-time in the universe, yet is somehow locked outside the mundane universe.

The primordial and notable Outer Gods are Shub-Niggurath, the "Black Goat of the Woods with a Thousand Young", and Ubbo-Sathla, the "Unbegotten Source" (later, Ubbo-Sathla is said to be Azathoth's sibling). They hold a particularly important position among the Outer Gods and are considered to be among the most powerful of the Outer Gods. In Fact, the three deities—Azathoth, the god of death; Yog-Sothoth, the god of time; and Shub-Niggurath, the goddess of life—are thought to form the Trinity with Azathoth at its apex. Additionally, in the past, Ubbo-Sathla stood alongside Azathoth and led the Outer Gods and the Great Old Ones.

Nyarlathotep, the "Crawling Chaos", is the soul and messenger of the Outer Gods, engaging in activities throughout the universe using various avatars and functioning as an intermediary between the deities of the pantheon and their cults. The only Outer God to have a true personality, Nyarlathotep possesses a malign intellect and reveals a mocking contempt for his masters.

In addition, the most ancient deities, such as Ycnágnnisssz, created by Clark Ashton Smith; and the primely or supreme deities of derived mythological works—such as Lu-Kthu, created by James Ambuehl; and Mlandoth and Mril Thorion, created by Walter C. DeBill, Jr.—are also regarded as among the most powerful of the Outer Gods.

Lovecraft himself never made reference to them as the Outer Gods, instead calling them the "Other Gods" (the gods of the outer hells), as noted in his short story "The Other Gods" (however, these terms do not have completely identical meanings). Authors such as August Derleth and Lin Carter included the deities now known as the "Outer Gods" among the Great Old Ones and made no distinction between the two.

This classification has become common in Chaosium's Call of Cthulhu role-playing game. While the Great Old Ones are, so to speak, “entities possessing physical forms and divine power,” the Outer Gods are considered to be more conceptual entities, closer to what we call "gods" in the truest sense. Generally speaking, the Outer Gods are said to rule the universe and are considered more powerful than the Great Old Ones. However, this classification is also occasionally applied based on a general power scale. Notable examples are the Ancient Ones, mighty beings who serve Yog-Sothoth; and the Mh'ithrha, who are in eternal conflict with Yog-Sothoth. Although they are not "Outer Gods" in the strict sense, they are treated as a powerful Outer God because of their immeasurable power, ignoring standard classifications.

Additionally, there is a subgroup of the Outer Gods known as the "Lesser Other Gods" (also known as the Lesser Outer Gods). Many of the aforementioned Ultimate Gods are regarded as Lesser Other Gods. They are weaker than the other Outer Gods (some are even weaker than the Great Old Ones) and are not widely worshipped; they play a crucial role in keeping Azathoth asleep. Occasionally, they are summoned during rituals dedicated to the Outer Gods or the Great Old Ones. However, some of them are worshipped on a small scale or are active somewhere within the universe (applies to the Lesser Other Gods listed below, and Spawns of Azathoth, notably three of the Azathi). In addition, among the Lesser Other Gods who are other than those listed below: Dhyighash, Glagga, Kr'nk, L'ysh, M'Tlblys, Nour, Pr'ktha, Shinjh, Thahash, Urafty, X-2634, and Yko.

Furthermore, there is a subgroup known as the "Larva of the Other Gods" (also known as Larvae of the Outer Gods). These are immature Outer Gods that have been separated from Azathoth or the Lesser Other Gods and drift through the cosmos or Dreamlands. Prominent examples include the Star Mother and Messengers of Azathoth. Dhyighash, Kr'nk, and Nour are sometimes included in this classification.

=== Ab-T'bohugha ===
Ab-T'bohugha (the Cosmic Buddha) is an Outer God with two forms. In its form as the "Volcanic Beast," it appears as a gigantic six-legged creature whose body is covered in lava and rock. In its "Bodhisattva" form, it sheds its shell of stone and fire to reveal a radiant, dragon-like figure that faintly resembles a human—with wings and tentacles and a head that blooms like a flower. It may also appear as a plasma form or a statue; in such cases, it is perceived as a radiant being from the celestial realm. However, both forms are merely manifestations on Earth. In reality, this deity is the embodiment of cosmic balance and harmony between opposites, and its ultimate goal is the dissolution of the earthly world and the unification of all beings in the immaterial realm. Further, Ab-T'bohugha is at odds with both Ghizguth, a Great Old One, and Nyx, a former Elder God.

=== Aforgomon ===
Aforgomon (The dreadful omnipotent time-god, Master of time, Time Eater) is an Outer God. Later, it is considered an immortal avatar of Yog-Sothoth. This deity has complete mastery over time and can control it at will.

This entity is also a god of wrath who appears when humans or other species interfere and provoke time. Aforgomon transports such beings to Dreamlands and binds them to a massive chair with chains for eternity. And then, finally, Aforgomon appears, and it inflicts a punishment in which the chains turn white-hot, completely burning them to ashes. Those sinners subjected to this punishment are found as corpses in the real world, but eventually, literally all of that person’s memories and records are lost. Xexanoth and Aforgomon are at odds with each other. Also, Mh'ithrha and Aforgomon are similarly at odds with each other.

=== Aiueb Gnshal ===
Aiueb Gnshal (The Eyes Between Worlds, The Child-Minded God) is a mysterious Lesser Other God, who has his abode in a forgotten temple located somewhere in Bhutan. He appears as a formless black void, with seven pulsing orb-like eyes, and is mainly worshiped by ghouls, which tribute him in a defiled cult described in the mysterious Cambuluc Scrolls of the wizard Lang-Fu, dating back to 1295 AD. Peering through the eyes of this god, after a hideous and devastating ritual, allows one to see straight into Azathoth's court. In the Cthulhu Mythos, it is rumoured that the powers of Mongolian warlord Temujin (Genghis Khan) was a favour of Aiueb Gnshal.

=== Aletheia ===
Aletheia (The End of the Darkness) is likely an Outer God symbolizing or incarnating the truth. This deity originates from the Greek goddess of truth, it manifests as a vast spiral of manifold titanic hands with a single cycloptic eye in each palm (as in Hamsa amulets), and kilometer-long wire-like protrusions able to ensnare living beings, replacing their spinal bone in puppet-like fashion. Introduced in Dylan Dog issue 374, In the plot, the entity has clear features of an Outer God rather than a Great Old One, as well as an appearance vaguely resembling that of Yog-Sothoth, and is invoked by a deranged prophet with words in Naacal or R'lyehan language almost coinciding with those featured in Cthulhu's invocation, with R'lyeh replaced with Z'lyeh.

=== Ancient Ones ===
Ancient Ones are the guardian deities of the Ultimate Gate, who conceal their physical forms beneath hooded cloaks. They serve Yog-Sothoth and stand upon a massive hexagonal pedestal engraved with hieroglyphs beyond the First Gate, where they decide whether to grant visitors a head for the Ultimate Gate. According to one theory, they may be manifestations of Yog-Sothoth and, at the same time, individuals who reached the Ultimate Gate in the distant past.

They are led by 'Umr at-Tawil, who is known as the Most Ancient One and is considered the avatar or servant of Yog-Sothoth.

=== Azathoth ===
Azathoth (Blind Idiot God, Nuclear chaos, Daemon Sultan, Lord of All) is a deity who rules the Outer Gods, created them (along with many other worlds) and thus effectively serves as the supreme deity of the Cthulhu Mythos. His title of blind idiot god is in reference to his detachment from the affairs of humans, and as being incomprehensible to the human mind. However, in later works, it is sometimes said to have been stripped of its intelligence by the Elder Gods, while at other times it is suggested that it is called “blind idiot god” precisely because it is irrational and primordial.

=== Azhorra-Tha ===
Azhorra-Tha is a Lesser Outer God who is imprisoned on the planet Mars by an Elder Sign, as it fled from Earth after the imprisonment of the Great Old Ones. Its appearance is that of an insectoid to toad-like squid, but its shape continuously changes, emitting an awful buzz. The Mi-Go discovered the prison of Azhorra-Tha in the following millennia, and made every effort not to reveal its location to any human being.

=== B'ar-Zok ===
B'ar-Zok (Ancient Evil, Son of None) is an Outer God who was born from nothing long before the dawn of time. Although it devoured a large part of the universe during the Great Old Ones' immature era, as countless Great Old Ones matured and began devouring the universe themselves, he created his own domain and took up residence there.

B'ar-Zok appears in A. P. Sessler's “The Ancient Evil”.

=== Blackness from the Stars ===
The Blackness from the Stars is a Lesser Other God, who is an immobile blob of living, sentient darkness, torn from the primal fabric of the cosmos at the center of the universe. It is distinguishable in darkness only as a vaguely shimmering oily pitch. Although intelligent, it speaks no known language and ignores attempts to communicate. This entity is weaker than the majority of other deities and is light-sensitive. It can be killed by exposure to sunlight, and can be harmed by light emitted by sources such as flashlights and candles. Therefore, it dwells in dark places without light, and launches an attack against the person holding the light source and the light source itself using a powerful whirlwind.

=== Blug ===
Blug (Lord of Filth and Decay) is an Outer God who embodies the corruption of the condensed universe. It is said that even the slightest intrusion into the material world is enough to taint the universe with filth.

=== Buddha ===
Buddha (Lord Buddha, Botsu) is a historical figure from ancient India who is part of the Buddhist cosmology. It has properties similar to those of the Outer Gods. However, it is stated that this classification should be taken loosely and used as a basis for comparison with Cthulhu Mythos entities. In fact, the Buddha is considered to be the yin-yang balance of calmness, order, and consciousness that counteracts Azathoth's perpetual state of eternal mindlessness and infinite chaos. For this reason, it is stated that the Buddha, as the guardian of the Dharma, is not affiliated with any part of Azathoth’s court, but rather is a counterpart, an invisible entity to the heartless Outer Gods. Buddha is also said to be in conflict with Mara, the avatar of Yog-Sothoth. Therefore, its position and attributes are diametrically opposed to those of the Outer Gods.

=== Cloud-Thing ===
The Cloud-Thing is a man-eating cloudy mass, it is an unnamed Lesser Other God at the court of Azathoth. When hunting, it uses a funnel-shaped cloud to pull in a single human. After eating a human, it turns purple. Its power is weaker than that of the other Outer Gods and most of the Great Old Ones, and while it sometimes is summoned by Azathoth when he appears, it cannot leave the area on its own even after Azathoth has departed. Furthermore, destroying it is difficult for humans, but not impossible. For this reason, it is extremely timid.

Although they differ in nature from The Cloud-Thing, there are four unnamed Lesser Other Gods—The Crackling Energy Mass, The Luminous Transparency, The Roiling Gas-Cloud, and The Shimmering Liquid—that occupy the same position.

=== C'thalpa ===
C'thalpa (The Internal One) is probably an Outer God who is a huge mass of living sentient magma, located in the Earth's mantle. She is the mother of the Great Old One Shterot, and five other unnamed hideous children. She is also served by a race of mole-like humanoid burrowers known as the Talpeurs.

=== Cxaxukluth ===
Cxaxukluth (Androgynous Offspring of Azathoth) is an Outer God who is one of the Seed-Spawn of Azathoth, grown to adulthood and monstrous proportions. In appearance, Cxaxukluth resembles something of a cross between Azathoth and Ubbo-Sathla: an amorphous, writhing mass of bubbling, nuclear, protoplasmic-gel. He normally dwells alone within an unnamed dimension beyond time and space, unless disturbed or summoned away.

=== Daoloth ===
Daoloth (The Render of the Veils) is the Outer God who dwells in dimensions beyond the three we know, and his astrologer-priests are said to see the past and future and even how objects extend to and travel between different dimensions.

"Not shapeless, but so complex that the eye could recognize no describable shape. There were hemispheres and shining metal, coupled by long plastic rods. The rods were of a flat gray color, so that he could not make out which were nearer; they merged into a flat mass from which protruded individual cylinders. As he looked at it, he had a curious feeling that eyes gleamed from between these rods; but wherever he glanced at the construction, he saw only the spaces between them." —Ramsey Campbell, The Render of the Veils

Not particularly evil, Daoloth still causes harm among humans. His indescribable shape causes men to go mad at the sight of him—thus, he must be summoned in pitch black. If not held in some sort of magic containment, he continues to expand. If someone finds themselves enveloped by this god, they are transported to utterly bizarre and remote worlds where said person usually meets their fate. Daoloth worship is rather rare on Earth.

=== Darkness ===
The Darkness (Magnum Tenebrosum, The Unnamed Darkness) is a mysterious Outer God spawned by Azathoth, and is the progenitor of Shub-Niggurath. Very little detailed information about this god has been revealed.

=== Demogorgon ===
Demogorgon (also known as The Beast of Revelation) is the Outer God of the apocalypse. It appears as a horrid seven-headed amalgamation of multiple animals. This horrific entity is presently bound in the Black Ark, a prison Ark created upon a vast body of supernatural knowledge, hidden away in the underground city. It is said that when it is free, it will enlist Nyarlathotep as a supporter and destroy the whole world. It is said to be so powerful that even the Great Old Ones are no match for it, and that it possesses power rivaling that of the higher Elder Gods and Outer Gods.

=== D'endrrah ===
D'endrrah (The Divinity) is a sort of blurry female Outer God of supernatural beauty, dwelling within her obsidian palace located on Mars' moon Deimos. D'endrrah was defeated by Cthulhu when it threatened to devour Earth sometime before the time of ancient Egypt. She lives in a hall composed of myriad mirrors that distort her appearance, which is that of a tentacled dark abyss. This Mythos entity is somewhat inspired by C. L. Moore's Shambleau, the illusionary Martian she-vampires of lust. She is also acted on behalf of Yog-Sothoth.

=== Droom-Avista ===
Droom-Avista (The Jester) is not a little god but a slumbering Outer God who can grant wishes. He knows many secrets, but he has a cruel sense of humor and distorts his worshippers' wishes, leading to unfortunate outcomes for them. Worshippers ask him questions in hopes of learning some secret; he reveals the secret they sought, but in a distorted, joking manner.

He granted the Philosopher’s Stone to the high priest of Bel-Yarnak, who sought a metal more precious than gold or silver; however, because the Philosopher’s Stone possessed such tremendous power, it could not be controlled, and the entire city of Bel-Yarnak was transformed into iron, the rarest element on the planet.

=== Ghroth ===
Ghroth (Harbinger, Maker of the Doom of Worlds) is an Outer God and resembles a small, rust-colored planet or moon with a single, gigantic red eye, which it can close to avoid detection. Ghroth drifts throughout the universe singing its siren song, the "Music of the Spheres". As it swings by a planet, any Great Old One or Outer God sleeping there is awakened by the song. This usually results in the extinction of all life on the planet or perhaps even the utter destruction of the planet itself.

Ghroth is believed to be responsible for the periodic mass extinctions that wiped out 90% of all life on earth, including the extinction of the dinosaurs at the end of the Cretaceous era. It may also have caused the destruction of the planet Shaggai, the homeworld of the intelligent, insect-like Shan. For this reason, Ghroth is also known as "Nemesis", or the "Death Star", named after the Nemesis Theory, first proposed by American astronomers Raup and Sepkoski.

=== Gi-Hoveg ===
Gi-Hoveg (The Aether-Anemone) is an Outer God or a Great Old One who is a cosmic-entity manifesting as a gigantic, spongy, and fleshy mass covered in a myriad of both eyes and spines. He is said to be the nemesis of the Outer God Uvhash, usually summoned to contrast this deity. He was born to Lu-Kthu.

=== Gloon ===
Gloon (The Corrupter of Flesh, Master of the Temple) is a fictional deity who has been imprisoned in his temple, made of dark basalt, since long before the sinking of Atlantis, and supposedly has no purpose other than to cause pain and suffering. There he serves as guardian of a dimensional gate. Accompanying him in the temple are the servants of Gloon, can leave its confines. There are also statuettes of Gloon, depicting him as a nude man wearing a laurel wreath, reminiscent of Ancient Greek art. These statuettes inflict terrible dreams of the temple in which Gloon resides upon whoever touches them. Eventually, Gloon gleefully sucks their soul into the statuette and then feeds on the soul, delighted in the agony which he causes.

Gloon is treated as a Great Old One, but is occasionally considered a Lesser Other God (Lesser Outer God).

=== Haiogh-Yai ===
Haiogh-Yai (The Outsider) is an Outer God who is a monstrous, amorphous, whirling entity living within a wandering black hole called Vix’ni-Aldru, which also hosts a city made of titanic blocks, inhabited by mysterious creatures resembling either worms or lizards. He was born to Lu-Kthu.

=== Huitloxopetl ===
Huitloxopetl is one of the Outer Gods or Great Old Ones who can manipulate dreams, and he is the son of Azathoth. While the Great Old Ones were fighting the Elder Gods, he did not join the battle and remained in Syrgoth, a galaxy at the edge of the universe. As a result, his father, Azathoth, punished him by imprisoning him there. This seal was later reinforced by the Elder Gods. He is said to be able to control vampires and the living dead, and he can also take control of living beings' consciousnesses. It is also said that he guides the souls of the dead into his realm of utter darkness.

=== Hydra ===
Hydra (Thousand-Faced Moon) was created by Henry Kuttner for his short story "Hydra". It dwells in an alternate dimension and appears as a vast sea of gray ooze. A multitude of living heads, some human and some alien, sprout from the ooze, sobbing and grimacing as if in great agony.

Hydra's worshipers trick others into sending the god sacrifices through a pamphlet known as On the Sending Out of the Soul. The last page contains a magical formula for astral projection. When followed, the formula always works as expected, harmlessly transporting the user in astral form to whatever destination is desired. However, unbeknownst to the user, the ritual also brings the subject into contact with the Hydra, which then merges with the individual's astral self, using it as a host. Anyone present where the astral traveler appears is decapitated, the victim's head taken to become part of the Hydra. Afterward, the astral traveler is returned safely to his or her original body, suffering no ill effects, except perhaps receiving a terrible shock from the grisly scene so witnessed.

Usually, Hydra is treated as a Great Old One, but is occasionally considered a (minor) Outer God.

=== Ialdagorth ===
Ialdagorth (The Dark Devourer) is an Outer God who is both the cousin and servant of Azathoth, appearing as a black, shapeless, malevolent mist. The sight of such a fiend is unsettling if not traumatizing.

=== Kaajh'Kaalbh ===
Kaajh'Kaalbh is a Lesser Other God, servitor of Azathoth, but secluded in a parallel chaotic-dimension where everything is unstable. The god itself is constantly formed or disrupted and has no true form at all. Whoever attempts summoning this entity needs the aid of a dimensional shambler, and the deity may manifest in a variety of forms, often as an immense lava lake or a vast pool of solidified quicksilver.

=== Kaalut ===
Kaalut (The Ultimate Abomination, The Dream-Death) is an Outer God who is likely a gigantic larva-like horror, dwelling in the nebulous realm of K'gil'mnon, along with the Gharoides, its parasitic insectoid servants.

=== Lu-Kthu ===
Lu-Kthu (Birth-womb of the Great Old Ones, Great Vortex, Lew-Kthew) is an Outer God who is a titanic, planet-sized mass of entrails and internal organs. On closer examination, it appears a wet, warty globe, covered with countless ovoid pustules and spider-webbed with a network of long, narrow tunnels. Each pustule bears the larva of a Great Old One.

Lu-Kthu is the origin from which the gods of the Pantheon of Lu-Kthu were born. The true form of Lu-Kthu is unclear; theories have been proposed suggesting that Lu-Kthu is a physical entity, a star, a nebula, a separate entity possessing all of these characteristics, or a "Great Vortex". The depiction shown above is based on a painting featuring Lu-Kthu.

Lu-Kthu is the primary deity of the “Lu-Kthu Cycle (Lu-Kthu Mythos),” which is derived from the Cthulhu Mythos.

=== Mh'ithrha ===
Mh'ithrha (Arch-Lord of Tindalos) is an invisible wolf-like fiend similar to Fenrir of Norse mythology (if not coincident). Mh'ithrha is the lord of the Hounds of Tindalos, and the most powerful. Although not an actual Outer God as such, its form and astounding powers defy standard classification. Mh'ithra's eternal battle with Yog-Sothoth is said to be legendary. This fact demonstrates that Mh'ithrha is a truly powerful entity, as approaching Yog-Sothoth.

=== Mlandoth and Mril Thorion ===
Mlandoth and Mril Thorion are two Outer Gods who primordial entity or force, not dissimilar to the Nameless Mist or Darkness, although it is uncertain if it is a place, conscious being, or an inconceivable maelstrom of unknown forces and properties outside the perceptible cosmos. It is mentioned in Uralte Schrecken as a kind of prime archetype from which all mythical god-heads are derived.

According to the cycle surrounding these beings, they are a sort of cosmic yin and yang, whose meeting resulted in the creation of all things (although Azathoth is usually attributed to this). Their joinings routinely create and destroy matter and entities. One of the beings created in this way was the inimical Outer God Ngyr-Khorath.

It is said that Mlandoth and Mril Thorion manifested from Yidh Nak as a result of the titanic explosion at the beginning of the universe. Mlandoth, together with Mril Thorion generated a "vortex" by being omnipresent throughout all time and space and continuously intersecting with one another; this vortex gave rise to all.

Mlandoth and Mril Thorion were created by Walter C. DeBill Jr., but were suggested years earlier by Clark Ashton Smith. Walter C. DeBill Jr. is an author of horror and science fiction short stories and a contributor to the Cthulhu Mythos.

Walter C. DeBill Jr. created a parallel to the Cthulhu Mythos, the “Mlandoth Cycle (Mlandoth Mythos),” with Mlandoth and Mril Thorion as its supreme deities. Walter C. DeBill Jr. identifies these two deities as corresponding to Azathoth.

=== Mother of Pus ===
Mother of Pus is a Lesser Other God, composed of slime, tentacles, eyes, and mouths. The Mother of Pus was spawned through an obscene mating between a human and Shub-Niggurath. When summoned to Earth, the Mother of Pus seeks refuge in pools of stagnant, foul water. This entity is still in the process of growing and has the potential to reach maturity by obtaining raw materials and human power of will. When people touch or approach this entity, their bodies become covered in festering sores and oozing fluid. It can also send nightmares to anyone within about a 20-mile radius and, in some cases, brainwash them.

=== Mynoghra ===
Mynoghra (She-Daemon of the Shadows) is an Outer God or a Great Old One who is a succubus-like demon with alien traits and tentacles in place of hair.

She is mentioned as a cousin of the Outer God Nyarlathotep in the O’Khymer Revelations. She has not been imprisoned, but unlike her cousin, she does not serve as a messenger of deities. Hell-Hounds, which were born of Mynoghra and Shub-Niggurath, are believed to be an ancestor of the Hounds of Tindalos. They serve Mynoghra.

Like her cousin, she makes contracts with people and seeks to bring them down. To her, human life is a delicious repast.

=== The Nameless Mist ===
The Nameless Mist (Magnum Innominandum, Nyog' Sothep) is an Outer God who is "misty, shapeless thing" spawned by Azathoth, and is the progenitor of Yog-Sothoth. Occasionally, it appears as a gray, pillar-like form with eyes all over its body. Its powers include possible omnipresence, reality warping, acausality, space-time manipulation, immortality, and incorporeality. This entity may harbor multiple deities and monsters within it.

=== Ngyr-Khorath ===
Ngyr-Khorath (The Ultimate Abomination, The Dream-Death) is an Outer God in the form of a dark blue-green mist that causes a sense of terror as it approaches. Once closed, an eye of flame forms within. He spawned by fission the Great Old One (or the avatar of) 'Ymnar, and his nemesis is the Elder God Paighon. Ngyr-Korath had been sleeping and dreaming in the silent, dark expanse of space since primordial times. When the sun and the planets were born, his dreams turned into nightmares. When life began to sprout on Earth, he went mad and resolved to destroy all.

=== N'h'll ===
N'h'll (the Nothing in All and All in Nothing, The Void) is a mysterious entity or force. N'h'll is the void for all, including all the Great Old Ones and Outer Gods. N'h'll is also Birth, death, and rebirth, and in between it all. It is said that no being can escape this void, and even such as Mlandoth (corresponding to Azathoth)—who are considered the creators of all —are no exception.

=== The Night ===
The Night is an Outer God of Dreamlands who personifies the primal fear of the night that lurks within every human mind. During the day, it takes the form of a large, dark puddle, but at night, the Horde of the Night emerges from that puddle and scatters throughout Dreamlands to expand its influence.

It sometimes acts in concert with the Haunter of the Dark, an avatar of Nyarlathotep.

=== Noth-Yidik and K'thun ===
Noth-Yidik and K'thun are Outer Gods who are mentioned in H. P. Lovecraft and Hazel Heald's “The Horror in the Museum” as entities associated with Azathoth.

In “The Madness Out of Time,” Lin Carter regards them as the creators and rulers of the Hound of Tindalos, and as beings who serve Azathoth.

=== Nyarlathotep ===
Nyarlathotep first appears in Lovecraft's 1920 prose poem of the same name, he was later mentioned in other works by Lovecraft and by other writers, and in the tabletop role-playing games making use of the Cthulhu Mythos. Later writers describe him as one of the Outer Gods. He is a shape-shifter with a thousand forms, most of them maddeningly horrific to humans.

=== Nyctelios ===
Once an Elder God, Nyctelios has been punished by his peers—especially Nodens—for having created a race of foul servitors. He has been permanently banished from the Elder Gods' Olympus and ultimately became an Outer God who was imprisoned beneath the eastern Mediterranean Sea, near Greece, in a dark, basalt-built citadel named Atheron. However, the exiled deity is not dead but just sleeping, and one day he will rise again from his abyss, manifesting himself as a blue, six-meter-tall, cyclops-like monstrosity, with the bulk of his body covered entirely in crawling worms.

=== Ny-Rakath ===
Ny-Rakath is an Outer God or a Great Old One who is a goat-like fiendish horror with bat wings and multiple horns, mentioned as the brother of Shub-Niggurath.

=== Olkoth ===
Olkoth (God of the Celestial Arcs) is an Outer God who appears as a demoniacal god-like entity able to reincarnate in human bodies if the stars are right (sort of a "Cthulhian" Antichrist). Olkoth may emerge in our dimension through an eyeless, grotesque statue of the Virgin Mary. Olkoth is a cautious being who has adopted a strategy of siding with the potential victors, but this strategy incurred the wrath of Yog-Sothoth.

=== Pan ===
Pan (Great God Pan) is a minor Outer God, a god of ancient Greek, and an avatar embodying Shub-Niggurath's male aspect. Pan occasionally appears in the form of a satyr and forces humans to bear his children. Although these children are beautiful, they generally tend to commit the most heinous acts as they grow up. Because of his ferocious, violent nature, he often drives humans to act impulsively and, in rare cases, transforms nearby humans into instinctive beasts.

=== R’luhlloig ===
R’luhlloig (The Hidden Mind) is a new Outer God born from one of the bodies or avatars of Nyarlathotep. Alternate version of Professor Moriarty, who was devoured by Nyarlathotep as a sacrifice, resisted digestion and continued to drain power from within until he finally eliminated Nyarlathotep’s mind and became a god. Intending to destroy Cthulhu and establish his own rule, he engages in hand-to-hand combat with Cthulhu himself. He put up a good fight against Cthulhu, but was torn to pieces. However, his power still resides within another.

=== Shabbith-Ka ===
Shabbith-Ka is a Lesser Other God who appears as a shapeless, roughly man-sized purplish aura, spitting and crackling with powerful electrical arcs. A sense of power, malignancy, and intelligence accompanies it, and persons able to gaze at its form long enough can see a rudimentary face or faces within the glowing mass.

=== Sothoth ===
Sothoth is an Outer God mentioned in "The Sussex Manuscript" who serves Azathoth and is the master of the Great Old Ones. It has created Yog-Sothoth (however, according to the common setting, The Nameless Mist did this), the Elder God Ulthar, and Great Old Ones.

Another theory states that Sothoth, along with Ubbo-Sathla and Abhoth, created the universe. However, many consider this to be apocryphal.

=== Star Mother ===
Star Mother (Great Mother of All) is one of the Larvae of the Other Gods. She appears as a chunk of yellow-green stone about the size of an infant. Its shape suggests a plump, huge-breasted, faceless female figure. From it, dozens of pencil-thin, root-like strands extend. She has no cult and is a fragile entity that even humans can destroy (however, there is a possibility that she could be revived as a regenerate from the fragments), although she is served by zombie slaves.

=== Suc'Naath ===
Suc'Naath (The mindless) is one of the mindless Lesser Other Gods who twist and dance in the court of Azathoth. It appears as a formless spinning hurricane-like thing with strings of violet and golden colors across its shape, constantly emitting sickening smacking and screeching noises while showing pain-stricken faces across its body.

Suc'Naath's essence is currently divided into three parts, one in a comet called Aiin, the other in some sort of statue located somewhere in the world, while the third has been genetically passed on for eons through prehuman, and now human races of Earth, mostly in the Middle East. The carriers of the Outer God's powers are said to have done great acts of magic and / or to have been insane. If these three parts are ever to be combined, Suc'Naath will be freed. This entity is served by a small Middle-Eastern cult known as the Golden Hands of Suc'Naath, who collect deranged intellectuals and trained assassins who wish to set Suc'Naath free (they may have connections to the old Hashashin cult as well).

=== Taranushi ===
Taranushi (Lord of the Jinn) is an Outer God who was summoned to Earth by Simoon, a Saharan sorcerer. Easily breaking free of his spell, Taranushi coerced Simoon to bring the jinn to Earth. Which Taranushi let loose on the people of the Arabian desert and eastern Libya. His giant form appears insubstantial, as if made of smoke. One with greyish skin and tusks coming out of its mouth. Taranushi can take a form that is human in shape, jinn, or a combination of the two.

=== Tru'nembra ===
Tru'nembra (The Angel of Music) is an Outer God who is the name given in the Malleus Monstrorum Call of Cthulhu role-playing game guide to the entity described in H. P. Lovecraft's novel "The Music of Erich Zann". It has no shape but manifests as haunting music itself. Tru'nembra is the most important Outer God for maintaining Azathoth's slumber. It also occasionally plays its songs for gifted musicians, eventually luring them away to the court of Azathoth.

=== Tulzscha ===
Tulzscha (The Green Flame) is an Outer God who is the name given in the Malleus Monstrorum Call of Cthulhu role-playing game guide to the entity described in H. P. Lovecraft's story "The Festival". Tulzscha appears as a blazing green ball of flame, dancing with its Lesser Other Gods at the court of Azathoth. This Outer God is more powerful than the Lesser Other Gods and influences Azathoth's slumber. It may also be related to Tru'nembra; it is speculated that it dances to Tru'nembra's music to prevent Azathoth from awakening. Called to our world, it assumes a gaseous form, penetrates the planet to the core, then erupts from below as a pillar of flame. It cannot move from where it emerges. It feeds on death, corruption, and decline to grow in power.

=== 'Umr at-Tawil ===
'Umr at-Tawil (The Most Ancient One, The Prolonged of Life, Guardian of the Gate) is the leader of the Ancient Ones, guardians of the Ultimate Gate. As a servant or immortal avatar of Yog-Sothoth, he discerns those who have reached the Ultimate Gate using the Silver Key, performs the rite of entry for those deemed worthy, and serves as a guide to travelers. He appears human in form but is about 1.5 times a human's size. He conceals his body in elegant drapery resembling fine fabric. He is an Omniscient entity who knows all of the past, present, and future. He sometimes appears in places such as Earth’s Dreamland, and he is also sometimes summoned in place of his master, Yog-Sothoth.

While his name is said to mean “The Prolonged of Life” in Arabic, there is a grammatical error in this translation (since “'Umr at-Tawil” would mean “the life of a Prolonged ” or “the life of the tall person”). Therefore, the spelling “Tawil at'Umr” is used in some later works.

=== Uvhash ===
Uvhash (The Blood-Mad god of the Void) is a Great Old One or an Outer God who appears as a colossal, vampiric, red mass of both tentacles and eyes. It dwells within the realm of Rhylkos, which matches with the red planet Mars, and whoever summons Uvhash witnesses an atrocious death. He has affinities with the star vampires, and is rumored to have been one of mad emperor Caligula's eldritch sponsors as well in the Cthulhu Mythos. There is enmity with both the Elder God Nodens and the Great Old One or Outer God Gi-Hoveg.

=== Xada-Hgla ===
Xada-Hgla (The Cradle of Chaos) is an avatar and original form of Azathoth or possibly a minor Outer God . Its body is contained inside a clam-like bivalvular shell, supported by multiple pairs of flexible legs. From the interior of the shell peeks a "mouthless face, with deep-sunk eyes and covered with glistening black hair". It can extend a number of jointed cylindrical limbs from its body to crush its victims or pull them into its shell.

When these two shells open completely, it triggers a blinding nuclear explosion that incinerates everything in the vicinity. In fact, there was an instance where Insects from Shaggai controlled scientists, summoned this entity into a nuclear reactor, and attempted to use it as a kind of nuclear weapon. Afterward, it typically fades from reality little by little for the time being, and eventually either reforms its form in reality. However, in rare cases, it continues to grow larger and larger into infinity after the explosion.

=== Xa'ligha ===
Xa'ligha (Master of the Twisted Sound, Demon of Dissonance) is an Outer God made of maddening sound, somehow similar to Tru'Nembra. There is some affinity with the Great Old One Hastur.

=== Xathagorra ===
Xathagorra (The Avenger, The Spawn of Chaos) is the Outer God who is the son of Azathoth. Xathagorra has a purple body, leathery wings, webbed hands, and countless tentacles. Xathagorra likely serves the Outer Gods and assists them in their avenging. In fact, in “The Fleece of Yaggar,” he carries out Shub-Niggurath’s vengeance.

=== Xenophor ===
Xenophor (Ultimate god, Maker of all things) is the Outer God who is both a creator and a destroyer, and is said to bring about destruction either for entertainment or out of indifference. It guards all the gates of the ethereal world that transcends time and space. It corresponds to the version of Azathoth depicted by Jeffery Scott Sims.

=== Xexanoth ===
Xexanoth (Lurking Chaos) is a fictional dark god from Clark Ashton Smith's Cthulhu Mythos work. It appears only once in "The Chain of Aforgomon", where it is summoned by the main character. Apparently, Xexanoth is the bane and mortal enemy of the time god Aforgomon and, because of Aforgomon likely being an avatar of the Outer God Yog-Sothoth, is probably the Outer God.

=== Ycnágnnisssz ===
Ycnágnnisssz (Foul Lord of realms unknown) is an Outer God who is the black, festering, amorphous mass that constantly blasts and erupts violently, spewing out bits of churning lava-like material. It spawned the Great Old One Zstylzhemgni.

Ycnágnnisssz is to be as ancient as Azathoth and likely to possess power close to his. For this reason, Ycnágnnisssz is counted among the progenitors of the pantheon of Cthulhu Mythos deities.

=== Yibb-Tstll ===
Yibb-Tstll (The Patient One) is an Outer God who is a gigantic, bat-winged humanoid with detached eyes, wearing a green robe. This horrible deity sees all time and space as it slowly rotates in the center of its clearing within the Jungle of Kled in Earth's Dreamlands. Beneath its billowing cloak are a multitude of nightgaunts, suckling and clutching at its breasts. Yibb-Tstll is also a child of Nyarlathotep.

Having a close connection to the Great Old One Bugg-Shash, some scholars suggest that Yibb-Tstll should be regarded as a Great Old One—specifically in the Drowners group introduced by Brian Lumley, parasitic alien entities which thrive by vampirizing the Great Old Ones themselves—though in RPG materials she was classed as an "Outer God". This is explained by the fact that she perceives all time and space and appears to have some connection to Yog-Sothoth. However, later sources explain that there are various theories regarding whether she should be classified as an Outer God, or a Great Old One, or a Unique Entity.

=== Yidh Nak ===
Yidh Nak (Cosmic Mother, Mother of Space, Dark Yidh Nak) is the most primordial Outer God, an entity, or a place, or a force that existed before the titanic explosion that began the universe, and before entities such as Mlandoth and Mril Thorion (corresponding to Azathoth).

It is thought that the emergence of Mlandoth and Mril Thorion from Yidh Nak was a result of the titanic explosion. The attempt by Yidh Nak and Mlandoth to reunite led to the creation of matter, life, and the gods in the universe.

=== Yidhra ===
Yidhra (The Dream Witch, Yee-Tho-Rah) is an Outer God who usually appears as a youthful, attractive, earthly female, though her shape may vary.

Yidhra has been on Earth since the first microorganisms appeared and is immortal. To survive in a changing environment, she gained the ability to take on the characteristics of any creature that she devoured. Over time, Yidhra split herself into different aspects, though each part shares her consciousness.

Yidhra is served by devoted cults found in such widely separated places as Myanmar, Chad, Laos, Sumer, New Mexico, and Texas. Members of Yidhra's cult can gain immortality by merging with her, though they become somewhat like Yidhra as a consequence. Those who serve her are also promised plentiful harvests and healthy livestock. She usually conceals her true form behind a powerful illusion, appearing as a comely young woman; only favored members of her cult can see her as she actually is.

According to recent theories, Yidhra is thought to be either an Outer God or a Great Old One.

=== Yiggrath ===
Yiggrath (the Unborn and Undying, the Hyper-Relativistic Nightmare) is an Outer God who was feared by the Phyterians, an amphibian-like race that flourished on Gamma Eridani4 over 60,000 years ago.

Yiggrath is believed to be an entity from an anti-universe that exists parallel to the known universe, and its body is composed of a strange substance—akin to dark electromagnetism—that lies between the known universe and the anti-universe. It looks like the quintessential image of a Western demon. It stands 3 miles tall and possesses massive wings that stretch from one horizon to the other.

Yiggrath appears when a long night lasting several days descends upon the location where a 15-to 20-foot-tall, goat-like skull artifact made of dark electromagnetism exists, and carries out a mass slaughter known as the “time of the skinturning.” By Yiggrath’s existence, the surrounding space-time continuum swirls and spins, collapsing as if turned inside out; time runs backward, space bubbles, warps, and tears apart, revealing the insanity-inducing spectacle of a distant, alien realm.

Yiggrath appears in Tim Curran's short story “When Yiggrath Comes”.

=== Yog-Sothoth ===
Kenneth Grant suggested Lovecraft's description of Yog-Sothoth as a conglomeration of "malignant globes" may have been inspired by the qlippoth.

The cosmic entity Yog-Sothoth (All-in-One and One-in-All, The Key and the Gate, The Lurker at the Threshold) was first mentioned in The Case of Charles Dexter Ward (written 1927, first published 1941). It is known to manifest in specific forms, such as "a congeries of iridescent globes, glowing spheres that constantly change shape and size" and "a mass of iridescent orbs, each emitting light as intense as the sun". However, these forms are merely superficial; it is said that the true body lies beneath them—a slimy monster with antennae.

It is an all-knowing deity and beyond all limitations of space-time, which means it knows the past, present, and future, and its nature is different from any other class of Cthulhu Mythos deities. Yog-Sothoth is coterminous with all time and space, yet is supposedly locked outside of the universe we inhabit. Its cosmic nature is hinted at in this passage from "Through the Gates of the Silver Key" (1934) by Lovecraft and E. Hoffmann Price:

It was an All-in-One and One-in-All of limitless being and self—not merely a thing of one Space-Time continuum, but allied to the ultimate animating essence of existence's whole unbounded sweep—the last, utter sweep which has no confines and which outreaches fancy and mathematics alike. It was perhaps that which certain secret cults of earth have whispered of as Yog-Sothoth, and which has been a deity under other names; that which the crustaceans of Yuggoth worship as the Beyond-One, and which the vaporous brains of the spiral nebulae know by an untranslatable Sign…

Yog-Sothoth contains all things at once, like Azathoth, but unlike Azathoth, it is unable to control all things on a massive scale. However, it is said that Yog-Sothoth includes knowledge of all things, past, present, and future. In this respect, it probably surpasses Azathoth.

Yog-Sothoth sees all and knows all. To "please" this deity could bring knowledge of many things. However, like most beings in the mythos, to see it or learn too much about it is to court disaster. Some authors state that the favor of the god requires a human sacrifice or eternal servitude.

According to the genealogy H. P. Lovecraft devised for his characters (later published as "Letter 617" in Selected Letters), Yog-Sothoth is the offspring of the Nameless Mists, which were born of the deity Azathoth. Yog-Sothoth mated with Shub-Niggurath to produce the twin deities Nug and Yeb, while Nug sired Cthulhu through parthenogenesis. In Lovecraft's short story "The Dunwich Horror", Yog-Sothoth impregnates a mortal woman, Lavinia Whateley, who then gives birth to twin sons: the humanoid Wilbur Whateley and his more monstrous unnamed brother.

Lovecraft's depiction of Yog-Sothoth is considered pantheistic, and it has been analyzed that even the infinite totality of all things and time itself is portrayed as part of “God” (Yog-Sothoth).

In Anders Fager's short story "Grandmother's Journey", a tribe of dog or wolf-like humans (analog to the "ghouls" of the Lovecraftian mythos) is said to have sacrificed to Yog-Sothoth to become "different". In Fager's "Herr Goering's Artifact", Yog-Sothoth is invoked to protect a couple of witches from Father Dagon.

Yog-Sothoth has some connection to the mysterious Old Ones mentioned in "The Dunwich Horror" (1929), but their nature, their number, and their connection to Yog-Sothoth are unknown. Nonetheless, they are probably allied to him in some way, since Wilbur Whateley, the half-human son of Yog-Sothoth, tried to summon them so that they could control Wilbur's more tainted twin and make it reproduce.

At the end of Lovecraft's last story, "The Haunter of the Dark", the protagonist Robert Blake calls on Yog-Sothoth to save him from the eponymous malign entity that he has let loose.

=== Yomagn'tho ===
Yomagn'tho (The Feaster from the Stars, That Which Relentlessly Waits Outside) is an Outer God who is a malevolent being who wishes nothing more than the destruction of humanity for unknown reasons. He waits in his home dimension in Pherkard, until he is summoned to Earth. When first summoned, Yomagn'tho appears as a small ball of fire that quickly expands to a large circle of fire with three flaming inner petals. The reptilian burrowing folk, the Rhygntu, are known to worship this malignant deity. He is described as being equal to Cthugha in terms of power.

== Elder Gods ==
The "Elder Gods" (also known as the "Elder Deities") are orderly deities who stand in opposition to the Great Old Ones and Outer Gods, and are considered by many to be benevolent. They live in the vicinity of Betelgeuse (also known as the Glyu-vho); and Elysia, the home of the Elder Gods. They rarely pose a direct threat to humans and often offer assistance. However, given their cosmic scale, it cannot be said with certainty that they are allies of humankind. Similarly, it is not clear whether they are truly benevolent and "good" deities. It is generally believed that the leader of the Elder Gods is either Nodens or Kthanid, though this varies across works. Other notable and Greater Elder Gods include Bast, Hypnos, N'tse-Kaambl, and Vorvadoss.

Oftentimes, powerful and non-evil deities that have been worshipped since ancient times in the real world are considered Elder Gods. Such as Jupiter, Wakan Tanka; and some powerful deities (like principal and supreme deities) from Egyptian, Greek, Roman, Aztec, Norse, and many ancient mythologies; and most of the deities of who are still worshipped today, such as Japanese, Hindu, and part of Buddhist mythology.

In addition, powerful and non-evil deities that appear in fictional works, such as Vergama from Clark Ashton Smith’s Zothique series, are regarded as Elder Gods.

It is said that "Lesser Elder Gods", such as the Star Warriors, take the form of fire or light, serve the Greater Elder Gods and fight the Great Old Ones.

There are many theories regarding the power and status of the Elder Gods. There is general agreement that they are hostile to the Great Old Ones and the Outer Gods, sealed the Great Old Ones away, and that they are generally less dangerous to humans and sometimes even help them. However, the specific details vary depending on the author and the work. Some theories suggest that the Elder Gods are powerful deities who created the Great Old Ones and the Outer Gods (or that all deities were originally a unified group), and that the Great Old Ones and the Outer Gods rebelled against them. Other major theories regard the Elder Gods not as inherently benevolent, but as deities whose views on the governance of the universe differ from those of the Great Old Ones and the Outer Gods. From a human perspective, they may still be terrifying entities. In fact, while Hypnos, Thanatos, and Thibakcul do have a side that protects humans, they occasionally act in ways that humans considers ruthless.

Like the Outer Gods, Greater Elder Gods are considered "gods" in the true sense, and their power is regarded as approaching that of the Outer Gods, or at times, even surpassing it.

Some deities were once Elder Gods but have since rebelled. Such examples include Nyx (see below), Nyctelios (see Outer Gods), Sekhmet, Anpu, and Suchos (see Great Old Ones). Additionally, there are deities such as the Emperador Inmortal who exert negative influences on humanity similar to those of the Great Old Ones. However, these particularly terrifying Elder Gods are banished and sealed away, like the Great Old Ones.

Lovecraft himself did not make a clear distinction between the Elder Gods and the Great Old Ones; he depicted only their opposing relationship, as seen in the relationship between Nodens and Nyarlathotep. It is in post-Lovecraft works that the Elder Gods are depicted as clearly opposed to Evil deities such as Cthulhu. Within the stories, it is often likened to the cosmic conflict in Christianity between God and His angels for Goodness, and demons for Evil. Derleth attempted to retroactively group the benevolent deity Nodens in this category (who acts as deus ex machina for the protagonists in both The Dream-Quest of Unknown Kadath and "The Strange High House in the Mist"). However, this dualistic view of good and evil has been met with both support and criticism, and in recent years, it has become the reason why the Elder Gods is not always portrayed as a benevolent deities.

Joseph S. Pulver mentions in his Nightmare's Disciple (2006) a set of original Elder Gods, but offers no descriptions of their true forms. The story introduces entities as Dveahtehs, Ovytonv, Urthuvn, Xislanyx, and Xuthyos-Sihb'Bz. Others have a cult title such as Othkkartho (Sire of the Four Titans of Balance and Order), who is said to be Nodens's son, and Adaedu, Alithlai-Tyy, and Eyroix (Three members of the Four Titans of Balance and Order) belong to Othkkartho. Zehirete (The Pure and Holy Womb of Light) is the wife of Nodens. Sk'tai is a queen of Elder Gods. Sk'tai was originally Cthulhu's second bride who bore to him a son, T'ith. However, Sk'tai was seduced by Kthanid, remarried him, and bore Eppirfon with him. T'ith and Eppirfon were raised by Kthanid and became benevolent gods. However, Cthulhu took vengeance on them and destroyed their bodies.

=== Apollo and Artemis ===
Artemis (also known as Diana) is the goddess of the moon and hunting in Greek mythology. In the Cthulhu Mythos, Artemis is a minor Elder God who is said to have been worshipped in connection with the Elder Gods Bast and Isis, and they were loosely joined and worshipped together. Apollo is the god of light and the arts in Greek mythology. In the Cthulhu Mythos, Apollo is a minor Elder God who is sometimes mentioned in relation to Artemis. They are occasionally confused with other deities from the Cthulhu Mythos, such as Shub-Niggurath.

=== Bast ===
Bast (Goddess of Cats, Pasht, Ubaste) is a notable Elder God who appears as a female human with a cat's head. She is named after the ancient Egyptian goddess Bastet. She is also known as Bubastis. In ancient Egypt, she was associated with Nyarlathotep and was worshipped by cultists. It is believed that this was orchestrated by Nephren-Ka and that a false doctrine was spread to revive the worship of Nyarlathotep. However, the cultists were expelled, and the form of worship described below became established.

She is worshipped by cats on Earth and in Earth's Dreamlands, where she protects and leads them. However, she rules only the cats on Earth, and she has no connection to the cats on Saturn or Uranus. In particular, she is in conflict with the cats of Saturn. In the past, she was also worshipped in ancient Egypt and Rome as the goddess of the home and war. Her worshippers felt a warm sense of comfort in her faith. This form of belief was observed both before the emergence of the cult mentioned above and after its expulsion.

She sometimes leads the cats into battle against the Great Old Ones and Outer Gods. While she typically shows no interest in humans, she treats people who are kind to cats with benevolence, but shows no mercy toward those who harm cats.

=== Danu ===
Danu is one of the most powerful Elder Gods. Together with Nodens, she imprisoned and sealed Hastur. She is also Nodens' consort goddess.

=== Emperador Inmortal ===
Emperador Inmortal is a mysterious and sadistic Elder God. He is said to be imprisoned in Tindalos. In the real world, he appears either by possessing humans under his influence or through such individuals. He has a sadistic personality and leads people to ruin through the use of drugs, video games, and other methods. His soliloquy reveals that he considers himself eternal and seeks the truth. He despises humankind for being trapped in the flesh and harboring corrupt thoughts, and attempts to change the universe by his own free will.
He has many similarities to the King in Yellow, an avatar of the Great Old One Hastur. The works in which he appears share elements with Robert W. Chambers’ novel The King in Yellow.

=== Eppirfon ===
Eppirfon is an Elder God who is the son of Sk'tai and Kthanid. He is said to be a god who brought joy and smiles to the universe. However, He was broken his body by Cthulhu, who has come to exact revenge.

=== Globes of Hakkthu ===
The Globes of Hakkthu are Elder Gods who are guardian deities of the planet Tond. They are sealing a part of Azathoth beneath the city of Tond.

=== Hera ===
Hera is an Elder God known as Zeus's wife. She is not an evil god and is often mentioned alongside Zeus. However, although she eventually reconciled, she once unleashed Cthulhu and other monsters against Leto, Artemis and Apollo when she was enraged by his infidelity.

=== Hypnos ===
Hypnos (Lord of Dream, Lord of Sleep) is an ambiguous deity regarded as a notable Elder God. First appeared in Lovecraft's short story "Hypnos". Hypnos is said to be the god who guards the boundary between reality and the Dreamlands; if people attract his attention through reckless behavior in the Dreamlands, they will incur his wrath. On the other hand, he can also bestow blessings upon his worshippers and helpful Dreamers. He is known for taking the form of a handsome man when he appears in human form, but his true form is terrifying.

He wields significant influence in Dreamlands and is believed to be its overall ruler. Hypnos may feed off the unconscious minds of living beings, including humans, and it is therefore possible that he is the one protecting Dreamlands.

He has the ability to freely alter the appearance of dreamers. This power can be used as either a blessing or a curse. This ability can do more than just alter a person's physical appearance or grant or take away abilities; it can even change the target's species.

=== Isis ===
Isis is an Egyptian goddess considered an Elder God in a role-playing game. She takes the form of a fortune-teller and provides information to humans. She has the ability to calm the passions and fighting spirit of the human mind, restoring a sense of calm.

In role-playing game settings, Horus, Ra (Khepri) and Hathor probably also be Elder Gods.

=== Jupiter ===
Jupiter (also known as Zeus) was the ancient Roman god of thunder. According to the legend in the story, he and his allies, the Elder Gods, sealed a god known as "One"—who possessed power equivalent to that of the common setting Azathoth—in a cave in the Alps a long time ago. Later, he was summoned by Marcus Antonius and, wielding his thunderous power, lashed the deities such as Cthulhu, Hastur (along with Zhar and Lloigor, and Ithaqua), and Yog-Sothoth.

However, in later sources, he is not portrayed as the most powerful deity. He is regarded as one of the Elder Gods who harnessed part of the power of Hypnos and the Dreamlands.

=== KAMI-SAMA ===
Most Japanese deities, such as the Amatsukami and Kunitsukami. This category is considered similar to the Elder Gods. While they are generally described according to traditional lore, they are sometimes associated with the magicians of the continent of Mu. Notable examples include Amaterasu, Susano-wo (Susanoo), Hisui Tennoh (also known as the Jade Emperor), Dosojin, Uji-gami (Ujigami), and Emma-O (Buddhist Yama). Furthermore, by definition, Ōmononushi no Mikoto is also included in this category (however, he is sometimes classified among the Great Old Ones).

=== Kthanid ===
A creation of Brian Lumley, Kthanid is a leader of the Elder God who is the brother or cousin of Cthulhu. He looks almost the same as Cthulhu; however, his eye color is gold, and his wing shape is Majestic and splendid. He is regarded as benevolent, yet he is also an extremely knowledgeable strategist. He is well-versed in scientific technology and magic. He possesses a monitor that predicts how every action across multiple dimensions will affect the future, and he can send telepathic messages across nearly the entire universe. Furthermore, he can unleash a torrent of magical power that inflicts damage on the Great Old Ones and the Outer Gods or forces them back to where they came from.

He first appeared in the Titas Crow series. In some works, he is the leader of the Elder Gods and the most powerful among them. He has used his own strength and wisdom to stand against all of the Great Old Ones and Outer Gods, successfully damaging and repelling them (except Azathoth) and destroying some of Nyarlathotep’s Avatars.

=== Leto ===
Leto is a minor Elder God, a graceful and kind goddess in Greek mythology, and the mother of the Elder Gods Apollo and Artemis. Although she herself does not possess any particularly powerful abilities, she raises her children to be strong and compassionate deities and teaches them about terrifying beings.

=== Neptune ===
Neptune is a minor Elder God who appears as either a subordinate or an ally of Nodens. Just as the legendary tale describes, he carries a trident.

=== Nereids ===
Nereids are minor Elder Gods who appear as either subordinates or allies of Nodens. They are described as having fantastical appearances.

=== Nira ===
Nira is an Elder god created by Llewellyn M. Cabos. She is the goddess consort of Nodens, who is fighting Rokon, one of the Great Old Ones, and the serpent folk of Zandanua.

=== Nodens ===
Nodens (Lord of the Great Abyss, The Hunter, Nuada) is a notable Elder God who appears as a bearded human male riding a huge seashell pulled by legendary beasts. He bears a special love for dreamers and visionaries. He has been known to take such individuals on trips with him across space and time.

In many works, Nodens is depicted as the leader of the Elder Gods and is said to have sealed away most of the Great Old Ones and Outer Gods. In particular, he conflicts with Nyarlathotep and sometimes aids those who oppose him. He and Yog-Sothoth are opposed to one another. His purpose is generally believed to be maintaining the balance of the universe and preserving the status quo (including neutralizing the Great Old Ones and the Outer Gods), and protecting the Great Ones.

Nightgaunts are under Nodens' command. However, Nightgaunts sometimes serve other deities (such as Yibb-Tstll), so not all of them are under Nodens' command.

In CthulhuTech supplements, Nodens is said to be the avatar of the Forgotten One Savty'ya.

=== N’tse-Kaambl ===
N'tse-Kaambl (Nsekmbl, N'sse Kaambl, She Whose Splendor Hath Shattered Worlds) is a notable Elder God who is the beautiful goddess who stands in the most intense opposition to the Great Old Ones and the Outer Gods. She is widely worshipped in the Dreamlands.

She wielded a spear that radiated a powerful aura of magic and a shield bearing the Elder Sign, which protected everything behind her, and she defeated many of them. Her sole concern is the ultimate defeat of the Outer Gods and the Great Old Ones; while she has little interest in humans, she will sometimes lend her strength to those who fight against them. When the threat they pose is significant, she possesses the ability to awaken her fellow Elder Gods to fight alongside her. She was probably inspired by Athena, a goddess from Greek Mythology.

She is also said to be the creator of the Elder Signs. Elder Signs serve as talismans against the Great Old Ones and their minions.

=== Nyx ===
Nyx (Mother of the Night) was originally an elder goddess who embodies the darkness of the night, mystery, and forbidden desire. She is thought to be an adaptation of Nyx, the goddess of the night in Greek mythology, into the Cthulhu Mythos. She is deceitful and is considered a renegade among the Elder Gods. She once allied with the Great Old One Ghizguth to seal away Outer God Ab-T'bohugha, but later turned against him, creating cosmic tension between abyssal and celestial waters. She commands the Children of the Night among other entities. She may be hostile toward humans, using numerous avatars to manipulate and enthrall those who encounter her, awakening an irresistible sense of obsession.

=== Ormazd ===
Ormazd (also known as "Ahura Mazda") is the Elder God, the principal deity of Zoroastrianism and the god of light and fire. It is said that it sometimes bestows magic on its worshippers. On the other hand, because it presides over fire, it was once mistakenly identified with Tulzscha and worshipped as such by certain groups. Another Great Old One shares the same name, but its nature differs significantly.

=== Oryx ===
Oryx is an Elder God who was introduced without name in August Derleth's "The Lair of the Star-Spawn" (1932). The name Oryx is given in the Call of Cthulhu RPG supplement "The Creature Companion" (The Bright Flame) and manifests as a giant pillar of blinding white and purple flames. Although its expression is bright and blinding, no one feels its heat. No one can look at Oryx for more than a few seconds; after the first glance, the eyes of anyone who looks become sore and watery.

=== Othkkartho ===
Othkkartho is an elite Elder God who is lordly sire of the Four Titans of Balance and Order. He is also Nodens's eldest son. Adaedu, Alithlai-Tyy, and Eyroix are members of the Four Titans of Balance and Order, led by Othkkartho.

=== Ousir ===
Ousir is the leader of the Five Gods who watched over Cthulhu while Nodens and Danu imprisoned Hastur. However, he was betrayed by the other Four Gods (Sutekh and his followers, Sekhmet, Anpu, and Suchos). He is regarded as Osiris in Egyptian mythology.

=== Oztalun ===
Oztalun (Golden and Shimmering One) is an Elder God introduced by James Ambuehl. It is symbolized by a seven-pointed star symbol, which is his own Seal.

=== Paighon ===
Paighon is a strong Elder God, or possibly Great Old One with scarcely any description: Walter C. DeBill, Jr.'s Paighon, an extra-galactic entity which now dwells in Earth's core, said to be inimical to the Outer God Ngyr-Korath and his servitor 'Ymnar.

=== Purple Emperor ===
Purple Emperor (Butterfly-winged Purple Emperor) is an Elder God who opposes King in Yellow and vies with him for control of the Throne of Time and Space. To prevent the resurgence of the play "The King in Yellow", he teams up with the original author, who became his servant.

=== Shavalyoth ===
Shavalyoth (Shadowy and Shapeless One) is an Elder God introduced by James Ambuehl, supposed to be dark and formless.

=== Sk'tai ===
Sk'tai is the Queen of the Elder Gods and Kthanid's wife. Initially, she was also Cthulhu's second wife. While pregnant with T'ith, Cthulhu's child, she was seduced by Kthanid, and married Kthanid. She gave birth to Eppirfon with Kthanid. However, She was broken her body by Cthulhu, who has come to exact revenge.

=== Tanka ===
Tanka (also known as Wakan Tanka, Great Spirit) is one of the Elder Gods' leaders. It banished almost all of the Great Old Ones from Earth and sent them back to their home planets.

=== Thanatos ===
Thanatos (Lord of Death, Son of the Night) is the Elder God who is the god of death in Greek mythology. Although he does not often appear actively, he sometimes acts alongside his brother, Hypnos.

=== Thermal Being ===
Thermal Being is an elite Elder God of unknown name who appears in Brian Lumley’s "Elysia". This deity was born in eons past in the heart of a star, whose half-life was five billion years. It is described as a lambent flame twice the height of a man, and it tapers at top and bottom, twirls clockwise where it stands still upon its own axis, and throws out filaments of flickering yellow energy.

=== Thibakcul ===
Thibakcul is an Elder God, a gigantic and beautiful entity (whose form is unknown, probably a mixture of solid and liquid) that dwells beneath the surface of Miobe, a planet in the Betelgeuse solar system. Because it is at odds with the Great Old Ones, it sometimes protects humanity, but for unknown reasons it extracts the souls of women it has singled out, summoning them to its presence to serve it. The summoned souls, filled with joy, carry out their tasks without ever defying or fleeing; however, the bodies from which their souls have been taken become "Dreamers" who remain in a slumber, protected by the Elder Sign. After several decades, the souls are set free and return to their original bodies. It is said that after death, they are summoned once again to Thibakcul and guided to a more exalted place.

=== T'ith ===
T'ith is an Elder God who is the offspring of the Great Old One Cthulhu and the Elder God Sk'tai. However, since Sk'tai left Cthulhu while T'ith was pregnant and married Kthanid, T'ith was raised by Kthanid. Later, faced with Cthulhu, who had come to exact revenge, he chose to die alongside his half-brother Eppirfon, rather than follow Cthulhu. And He was swallowed by Cthulhu.

=== Tritons ===
Tritons are minor Elder Gods who appear as either subordinates or allies of Nodens. They are depicted as cheerful gods holding a seashell. They are based on Triton, the god of the sea in Greek mythology.

=== Ulthar ===
Ulthar (also known as Uldar) is an Elder God and the son of Sothoth who was sent to Earth, in order to keep watch over the Great Old Ones. Every one thousand years, the rulers and priests of all the empires on Earth conduct a ritual that summons an avatar of Ulthar, known as Ultharathotep.

=== Un-Dhu-Miluhk and Rhu-thmar-duhk ===
Un-Dhu-Miluhk is a weak Elder God slumbering beneath the valleys of the Welsh coal mining country. He dreams of Rhu-thmar-duhk (Widow of the Western Winds), whom he loves, and composes poems expressing his romantic passion for her. Although Un-Dhu-Miluhk is a descendant of Cthulhu, the fact that he loves Rhu-thmar-duhk has led to his being described as naught but a spent abstraction of his forebear, naught but a passing of gas from the vile passage of a worthier deity.

=== Vorvadoss ===
Vorvadoss (The Flaming One, Lord of the Universal Spaces, The Troubler of the Sands, Who Waiteth in the Outer Dark) is a notable Elder God or possibly a Great Old One who appears as a cloaked, hooded being, enveloped in green flames, with fiery eyes.

He is generally regarded as benevolent toward humans. He usually offers advice when asked by his worshippers, but he rarely intervenes directly, because he said that “Go therefore fearlessly, since god cannot conquer god, but only man who created him.” Simply put, he believes only humans—who created god—should be the ones to conquer god. However, he sometimes lends his power directly to drive back the Great Old Ones. He is also believed to possess the power of fire. He also defeated and exiled Mnomquah. He serves as a jailer who restrains the Outer Gods and the Great Old Ones.

He is described as a son of both the Elder God Nodens and the Great Old One Lythalia and has a twin brother, Yaggdytha. Therefore, within that work, he is regarded as the only entity that is neither wholly a Great Old One nor wholly an Elder God.

=== Yad-Thaddag ===
Yad-Thaddag is another Elder God created by Brian Lumley. It has the same appearance and power as Yog-Sothoth, except its spheres' colors are of gold and its nature is purely benevolent. It is described as a Higher Elder God, second only to Kthanid. It is said to be Yog-Sothoth's cousin or another aspect of the compassionate Yog-Sothoth.

=== Yaggdytha ===
Yaggdytha (The Incandescent One) is an Elder God who is the twin brother of Vorvadoss, manifesting as a great, amorphous, incandescent ball of cyan living energy, spreading itself into a web of giant talons of light.

=== Zehirete ===
Zehirete (Pure and Holy Womb of Light) is an elite Elder God who is the wife of Nodens.

== See also ==
- Cthulhu Mythos
- List of Great Old Ones
- Hyperborean cycle
- Xothic legend cycle
- Family tree of Tsathoggua
- List of works influenced by the Cthulhu Mythos

== Bibliography ==
- Harms, Daniel (1998). "Heritage of Horror". The Encyclopedia Cthulhiana (2nd ed.). Oakland, CA: Chaosium. ISBN 1-56882-119-0.
- Lovecraft, Howard (1982). The Best of H. P. Lovecraft: Bloodcurdling Tales of Horror and the Macabre (1st edition ed.) (1st ed.). Ballantine Books. ISBN 0-345-35080-4.
- Price, Robert M. (1996). The New Lovecraft Circle. New York, NY: Random House. ISBN 0-345-44406-X.
- Thompson, C. Hall (1946). Spawn of the Green Abyss (3rd ed.). Robert M. Price, Fedogan & Bremer, 1992. ISBN 1-878252-02-X.
- Myers, Gary (1975). "Xiurhn". The House of the Worm. Sauk City, WI: Arkham House. ISBN 0-9789911-3-3.
- Pulver, Joseph S. (1999). Nightmare's Disciple. Chaosium. ISBN 1-56882-118-2.
- Harms, Daniel; Gonce, John Wisdom III (2003). The Necronomicon Files: The Truth Behind Lovecraft's Legend. Weiser Books. ISBN 978-1578632695.
