= Hastur =

Fictional creature and deity

- Cthulhu Mythos character
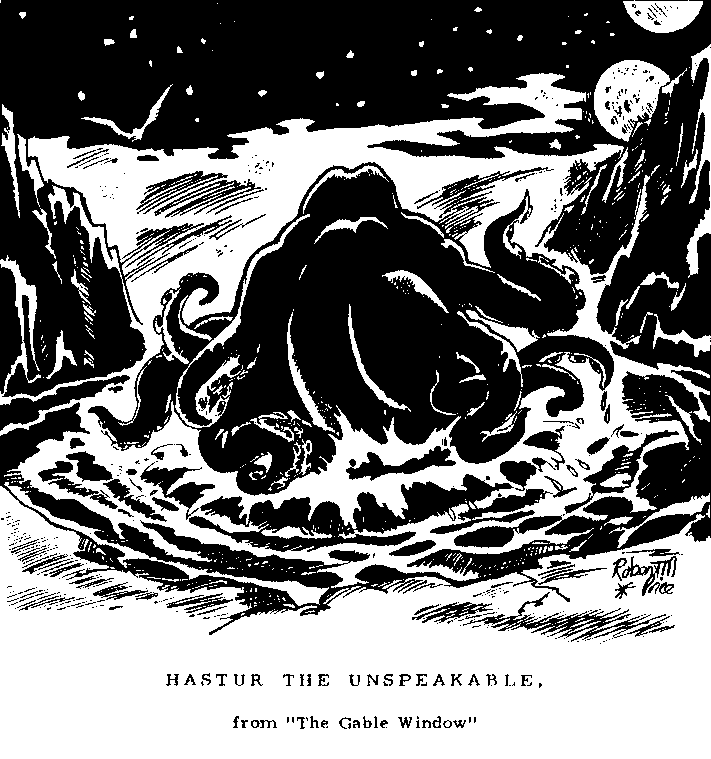
- Hastur the Unspeakable as he appears in August Derleth's short story "The Gable Window". Illustration by Robert M. Price published in Crypt of Cthulhu #6 "August Derleth Issue", St. John's Eve 1982.
- First appearance: "Haïta the Shepherd"
- Created by: Ambrose Bierce

In-universe information
- Species: Great Old One
- Gender: Male

Hastur (known by the epithets The Unspeakable One, The King in Yellow, He Who Is Not to be Named, Assatur, Xastur, H'aaztre, Fenric, or Kaiwan) is a deity of the Cthulhu Mythos.

Hastur first appeared in Ambrose Bierce's short story "Haïta the Shepherd" (1891) as a benign god of shepherds.

Subsequently Robert W. Chambers used the name in his late 1800s stories to represent both a person and a place associated with several stars, including Aldebaran. H. P. Lovecraft was inspired by Chambers's stories and briefly mentioned Hastur in The Whisperer in Darkness (1930). Later writers have also adapted Hastur in a variety of tales.

== Appearances ==
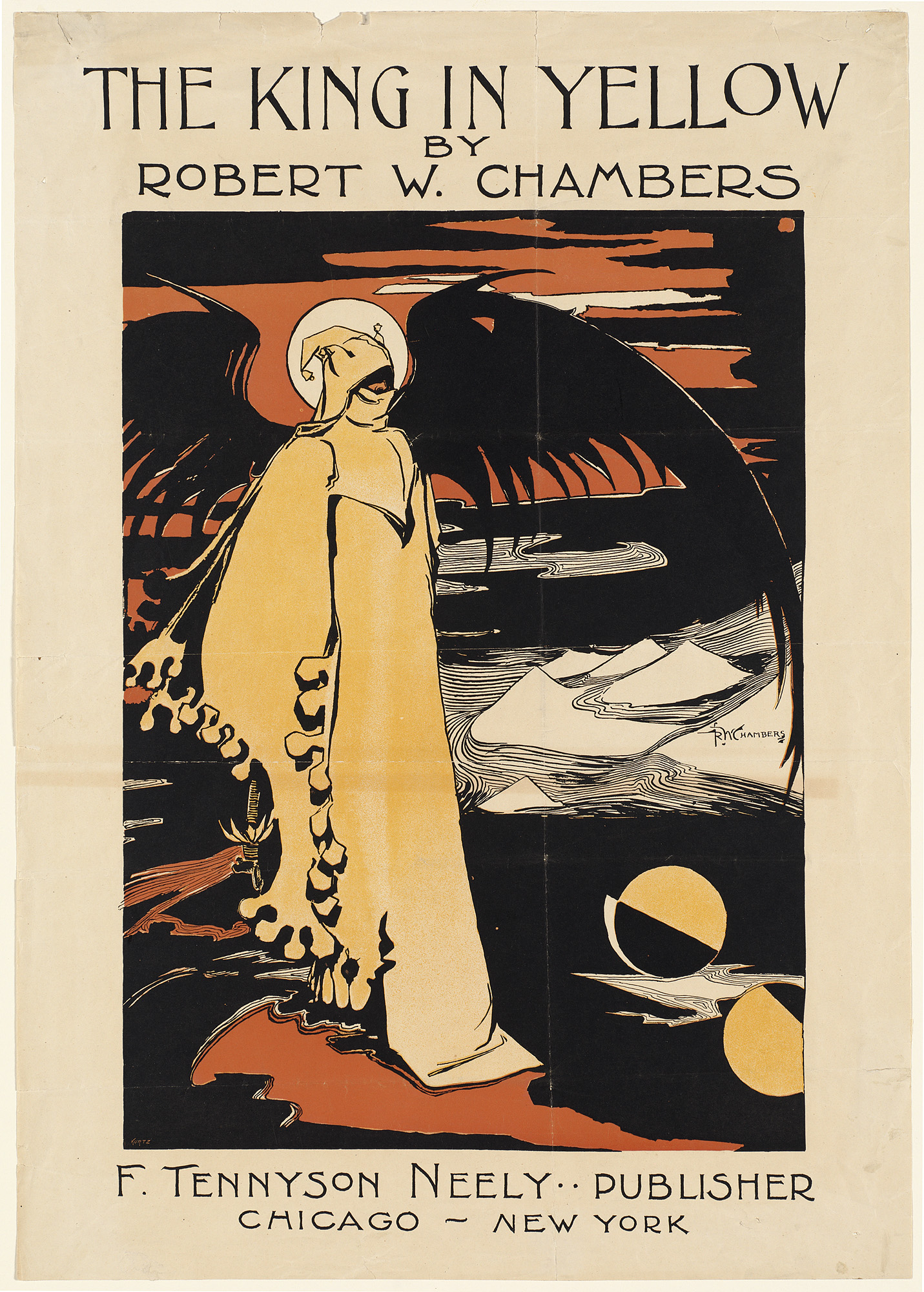
Hastur as he appears in The King in Yellow.

=== In the works of H. P. Lovecraft ===
In Chambers' The King in Yellow (1895), a collection of horror stories, Hastur is the name of a potentially supernatural character (in "The Demoiselle D'Ys"), a place (in "The Repairer of Reputations"), and mentioned without explanation in "The Yellow Sign". The latter two stories also mention Carcosa, Hali, Aldebaran, and the Hyades, along with a "Yellow Sign" and a play called The King in Yellow.

H. P. Lovecraft read Chambers' book in early 1927. Lovecraft was so enchanted by the book that he added elements of it to his own creations. There are two places in Lovecraft's own writings in which Hastur is mentioned:

I found myself faced by names and terms that I had heard elsewhere in the most hideous of connections—Yuggoth, Great Cthulhu, Tsathoggua, Yog-Sothoth, R'lyeh, Nyarlathotep, Azathoth, Hastur, Yian, Leng, the Lake of Hali, Bethmoora, the Yellow Sign, L’mur-Kathulos, Bran, and the Magnum Innominandum—and was drawn back through nameless aeons and inconceivable dimensions to worlds of elder, outer entity at which the crazed author of the Necronomicon had only guessed in the vaguest way.

— H. P. Lovecraft, The Whisperer in Darkness

Later in the same story, it is described that the Mi-Go have been attacked by followers of Hastur, and Hastur is an enemy of the Outer Ones whom the Mi-Go serve:

Actually, they have never knowingly harmed men, but have often been cruelly wronged and spied upon by our species. There is a whole secret cult of evil men (a man of your mystical erudition will understand me when I link them with Hastur and the Yellow Sign) devoted to the purpose of tracking them down and injuring them on behalf of monstrous powers from other dimensions. It is against these aggressors—not against normal humanity—that the drastic precautions of the Outer Ones are directed.

— H. P. Lovecraft, The Whisperer in Darkness

Derleth also developed Hastur into a Great Old One, spawn of Yog-Sothoth, the half-brother of Cthulhu, and possibly the Magnum Innominandum. In this incarnation, Hastur has several Avatars:

- The Feaster from Afar: A black, shriveled, flying monstrosity with tentacles tipped with razor-sharp talons that can pierce a victim's skull and siphon out the brain.
- The King in Yellow: A notable avatar based on the work of Robert W. Chambers.

Anders Fager's "Collected Swedish Cults" features a Stockholm-based coterie known as "The Carcosa Foundation" that worships Hastur.

Hastur is amorphous, but he is described as a vast, vaguely octopoid being. In the mythos, Hastur is presented as having "a strange effect on artists and playwrights".

The Hastur from Ambrose Bierce’s works inspired the name of Hastur in the Cthulhu Mythos. Still, he is generally distinguished from the Hastur of the Cthulhu Mythos, whose backstory differs significantly. However, aspects of Bierce’s Hastur are sometimes incorporated into the Cthulhu Mythos. For example, sometimes Hastur is portrayed as the “Shepherd God of Carcosa.”

Hastur appears as HASTUR THE UNSPEAKABLE (He Who Must Not Be Named) "Master of the Air" in the first through fifth printings of the Advanced Dungeons & Dragons book Deities & Demigods. While the publisher legally had the rights to publish Hastur, the entire Cthulhu Mythos section was subsequently redacted starting with the 6th printing as "Legends & Lore" to avoid any possible controversy. Additionally, the Melnibonéan Mythos section was also removed, all female topless illustrations were removed and the title of the book was changed for the same reason.

=== Other appearances ===
Hastur has also appeared outside of Lovecraft's own writings. Hastur appears in Neil Gaiman's short parody "I, Cthulhu" (1987). An anthropomorphic Hastur, with no reference to the Cthulhu Mythos, appears as a humourously inept villain in Good Omens (1990) by Terry Pratchett and Neil Gaiman, and is played by Ned Dennehy in the 2019 televised adaptation.

== See also ==
- Cthulhu Mythos in popular culture
