= The Whisperer in Darkness =

Novella by H. P. Lovecraft

- Short story by H. P. Lovecraft
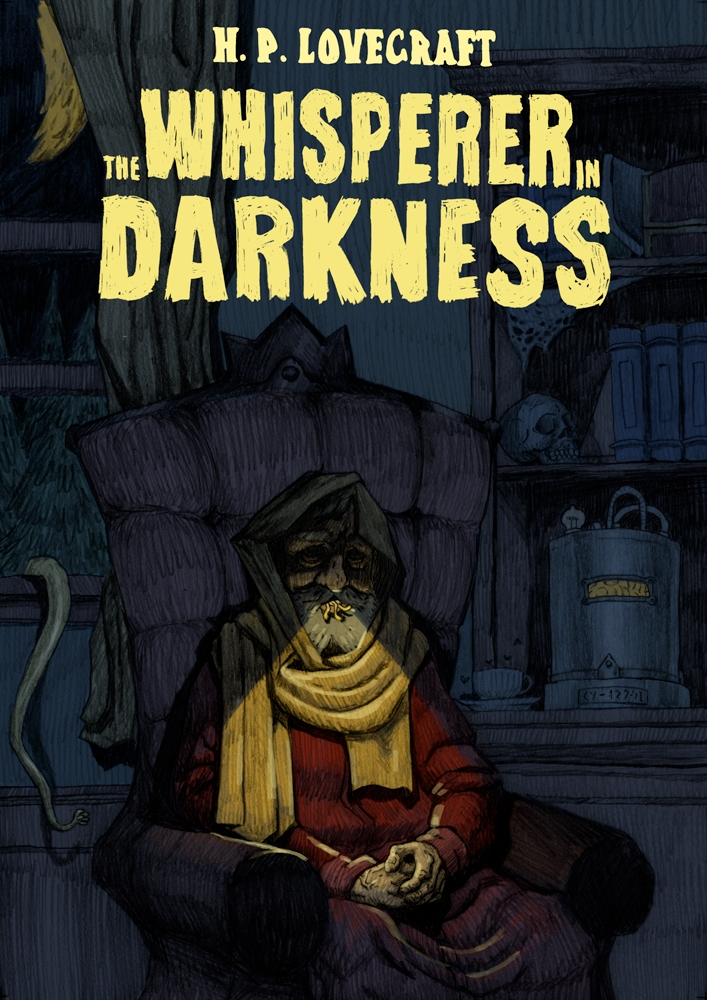
- Cover for "The Whisperer in Darkness" by Alexander Moore (2016).

Text available at Wikisource
- Country: United States
- Language: English
- Genres: Horror, science fiction

Publication
- Published in: Weird Tales
- Publication type: Periodical
- Media type: Print (magazine)
- Publication date: August 1931

The Whisperer in Darkness is a 26,000-word novella by American writer H. P. Lovecraft. Written February–September 1930, it was first published in Weird Tales, August 1931. Similar to "The Colour Out of Space" (1927), it is a blend of horror and science fiction. Although it makes numerous references to the Cthulhu Mythos, the story is not a central part of the mythos, but reflects a shift in Lovecraft's writing at this time towards science fiction. The story also introduces the Mi-Go, an extraterrestrial race of fungoid creatures.

== Plot ==
The story is told by Albert N. Wilmarth, an instructor of literature at Miskatonic University in Arkham, Massachusetts. When local newspapers report strange things seen floating in rivers during a historic flood in Vermont, Wilmarth becomes embroiled in a controversy regarding the reality and significance of the sightings. He sides with the skeptics, blaming old legends about monsters living in uninhabited hills that abduct people venturing too close to their territory.

Wilmarth receives a letter from Henry Wentworth Akeley, a man living in an isolated farmhouse near Townshend, Vermont, who claims to have proof that will convince Wilmarth he must stop questioning the creatures' existence. The two exchange letters that include an account of the extraterrestrial race chanting with human agents in worship of several beings, including Cthulhu and Nyarlathotep, the latter of whom "shall put on the semblance of men, the waxen mask and the robe that hides".

The agents intercept Akeley's messages and harass his farmhouse nightly. They exchange gunfire and many of Akeley's guard dogs are killed, as are several of the agents. Later, Akeley reports having killed members of the extraterrestrial race, describing them as bleeding a sickly greenish fluid. Although he expresses more in his letters, Akeley abruptly has a change of heart, writing that he has met with the beings and has learned that they are peaceful. Furthermore, they have taught him of marvels beyond all imagination. He urges Wilmarth to pay him a visit and to bring along the letters and photographic evidence that he had sent him. Wilmarth reluctantly consents.

Wilmarth arrives to find Akeley in a pitiful physical condition, immobilized in a chair in darkness. He tells Wilmarth about the beings and the wonders they have revealed to him. He also says that the beings can surgically extract a human brain and place it into a canister wherein it can live indefinitely and withstand the rigors of space travel. Akeley says he has agreed to undertake such a journey and points to a cylinder bearing his name. Wilmarth also listens to a brain in a cylinder as it speaks, by way of attached devices, of the positive aspects of the journey and why Wilmarth should join it in the trip to Yuggoth, the beings' outpost on Pluto. During these conversations, Wilmarth feels a vague sense of unease, especially from Akeley's odd manner of buzzing whispering.

During the night, a sleepless Wilmarth overhears a disturbing conversation with several voices, some of which are distinctly bizarre. Once all is silent, he creeps downstairs to investigate. He finds that Akeley is no longer present, but the robe he was wearing is discarded in the chair. Upon a closer look, he makes a horrifying discovery amid the folds of the robe which sends him fleeing the farmhouse by stealing Akeley's car. When the authorities investigate the next day, they find nothing but a bullet-riddled house. Akeley has disappeared along with all the physical evidence of the extraterrestrial presence.

Wilmarth explains the understanding of some of Akeley's letters about the cosmology of reality as he learned, stating:

Even now I absolutely refuse to believe what he implied about the constitution of ultimate infinity, the juxtaposition of dimensions, and the frightful position of our known cosmos of space and time in the unending chain of linked cosmos-atoms which makes up the immediate super-cosmos of curves, angles, and material and semi-material electronic organisation.

As the story concludes, Wilmarth discloses the discovery from which he fled in terror: Akeley's discarded face and hands. These were utilized by something inhuman to disguise itself as a man. He now believes with a dreadful certainty that the cylinder in that dark room with that whispering creature already contained the brain of Henry Wentworth Akeley.

== Characters ==
=== Albert Wilmarth ===
The narrator of the story, Albert N. Wilmarth is described as a folklorist and assistant professor of English at Miskatonic University. He investigates the strange events that followed in the wake of the historic Vermont floods of 1927.

Wilmarth is also mentioned in Lovecraft's At the Mountains of Madness, where the narrator remarks that he wishes he hadn't "talked so much with that unpleasantly erudite folklorist Wilmarth at the university." Elsewhere, the story refers to "the wild tales of cosmic hill things from outside told by a folklorist colleague in Miskatonic's English department."

Wilmarth is the main character in Fritz Leiber's "To Arkham and the Stars", written and presumably set in 1966, when the now-septuagenarian professor is chair of Miskatonic's Literature Department. Leiber describes him as "slender [and] silver-haired", with a "mocking sardonic note which has caused some to call him 'unpleasantly' rather than simply 'very' erudite." He acknowledges keeping "in rather closer touch with the Plutonians or Yuggothians than perhaps even old Dyer guesses." Wilmarth remarks in the story, "[A]fter you've spent an adult lifetime at Miskatonic, you discover you've developed a rather different understanding from the herd's of the distinction between the imaginary and the real."

In Brian Lumley's novel The Burrowers Beneath and its sequels, the Wilmarth Foundation is an Arkham-based organization dedicated to combating what Lumley refers to as the Cthulhu Cycle Deities.

Robert M. Price describes Wilmarth as "the model Lovecraft protagonist. ... Wilmarth starts out blissfully ignorant and only too late learns the terrible truth, and that only after a long battle with his initial rationalistic skepticism."

Lawrence King's 2018 novel Haunted Hills presumes that Wilmarth returned to the Akeley farm and is replaced by the Mi-Go "whisperer." In his guise as Dr. Wilmarth, the Mi-Go returns to Miskatonic University awaiting the fulfillment of his purpose for being on Earth.

=== Henry Akeley ===
Henry Wentworth Akeley is a Vermont folklorist and correspondent of Albert Wilmarth. Henry Akeley became a noted academic, probably in the study of folklore. His wife died in 1901 after giving birth to his only heir, George Goodenough Akeley. When he retired, Akeley returned to his ancestral home, a two-story farmhouse in the Vermont hills near the slopes of Dark Mountain. In September 1928, he was visited by Professor Wilmarth, who was researching bizarre legends of the region. Shortly thereafter, Akeley disappeared mysteriously from his mountaintop home—though Wilmarth believed that he fell victim to the machinations of the sinister Fungi from Yuggoth. S. T. Joshi, has suggested that the possible creature masquerading as Akeley is actually Nyarlathotep, due to a quote from what the Mi-go chant on the phonograph record: "To Nyarlathotep, Mighty Messenger, must all things be told. And He shall put on the semblance of men, the waxen mask and the robe that hides, and come down from the world of Seven Suns to mock..." He writes that "this seems a clear allusion to Nyarlathotep disguised with Akeley's face and hands but if so, it means that at this time Nyarlathotep is, in bodily form, one of the fungi — especially if, as seems likely, Nyarlathotep is one of the two buzzing voices Albert Wilmarth overhears at the end." Joshi notes this is problematic, because "if Nyarlathotep is (as critics have termed it) a 'shapeshifter', why would he have to don the face and hands of Akeley instead of merely reshaping himself as Akeley?"

In his sequel to "The Whisperer in Darkness", "Documents in the Case of Elizabeth Akeley" (1982), Richard A. Lupoff explores the idea that Akeley did not fall prey to the Mi-go as is suggested in the book, but instead joined them willingly. Lupoff also proposes that Akeley was the illegitimate son of Abednego Akeley, a minister for a Vermont sect of the Starry Wisdom Church, and Sarah Phillips, Abednego's maidservant.

=== George Goodenough Akeley ===
George Akeley is mentioned in The Whisperer in Darkness as the son of Henry Wentworth Akeley. According to The Whisperer in Darkness, George moved to San Diego, California, after his father retired.

The 1976 Fritz Leiber story "The Terror From the Depths" mentions Akeley being consulted at his San Diego home by Professor Albert Wilmarth in 1937.

"Documents in the Case of Elizabeth Akeley", a 1982 sequel to The Whisperer in Darkness by Richard A. Lupoff, describes Akeley, inspired by the evangelist Aimee McPherson, starting a sect called the Spiritual Light Brotherhood and serving as its leader, the Radiant Father. After his death, his granddaughter Elizabeth Akeley took over the role.

In 1928, Lovecraft took a trip through rural Vermont with a man named Arthur Goodenough. During his jaunt, he met a local farmer with a name that bears a striking resemblance to the ill-fated character of Lovecraft's tale: one Bert G. Akley.

=== Noyes ===
A largely unknown man who is allied with the Mi-Go, or the Outer Ones and is connected with both the disappearance of a local farmer, a man named Brown, and the security of the Mi-Go camp. He aided Wilmarth upon his arrival in Brattleboro and took him to Akeley's home. Afterward, Noyes is seen and heard sleeping on the sofa during Wilmarth's escape.

In Lawrence King's 2018 novel Haunted Hills, Noyes returns as both an aide and hindrance to the sinister plot of the Mi-Go "whisperer."

== References to other works ==
The following passage from The Whisperer in Darkness lists the names of various beings and places that occur in the works of Lovecraft and other writers:

I found myself faced by names and terms that I had heard elsewhere in the most hideous of connections—Yuggoth, Great Cthulhu, Tsathoggua, Yog-Sothoth, R'lyeh, Nyarlathotep, Azathoth, Hastur, Yian, Leng, the Lake of Hali, Bethmoora, the Yellow Sign, L'mur-Kathulos, Bran, and the Magnum Innominandum...

Among the more obscure names mentioned here are:

Bethmoora
Bethmoora is a fabled city in an eponymous story by Lord Dunsany, a favorite author of Lovecraft.
Bran
Bran is an ancient British pagan deity. However, in this context, Lovecraft refers to Bran Mak Morn, last king of the Picts in Robert E. Howard's swords-and-sorcery fiction. The reference is a homage to Howard, one of his correspondents.
L'mur-Kathulos
L'mur may refer to Lemuria, a fabled land bridge but a sunken continent in the Cthulhu Mythos. Kathulos is an Atlantean sorcerer, the titular character of Robert E. Howard's story Skull-Face. A reader had written to Howard asking if Kathulos derived from Cthulhu. Howard mentioned this in a letter to Lovecraft; Lovecraft liked the notion, and in his reply said that he might adopt the name into the mythos in the future.
Magnum Innominandum
Magnum Innominandum means "the great not-to-be-named" in Latin.
Yian
Yian probably refers to Yian-Ho. In the short story "Through the Gates of the Silver Key" (1934), a collaboration between Lovecraft and E. Hoffman Price, Yian-Ho is a "dreadful and forbidden city" on the Plateau of Leng. Yian also may refer to the fictional city of Yian, in the "weird" short story "The Maker of Moons" (1896) by Robert W. Chambers (one of Lovecraft's favourite authors).

== Inspiration ==
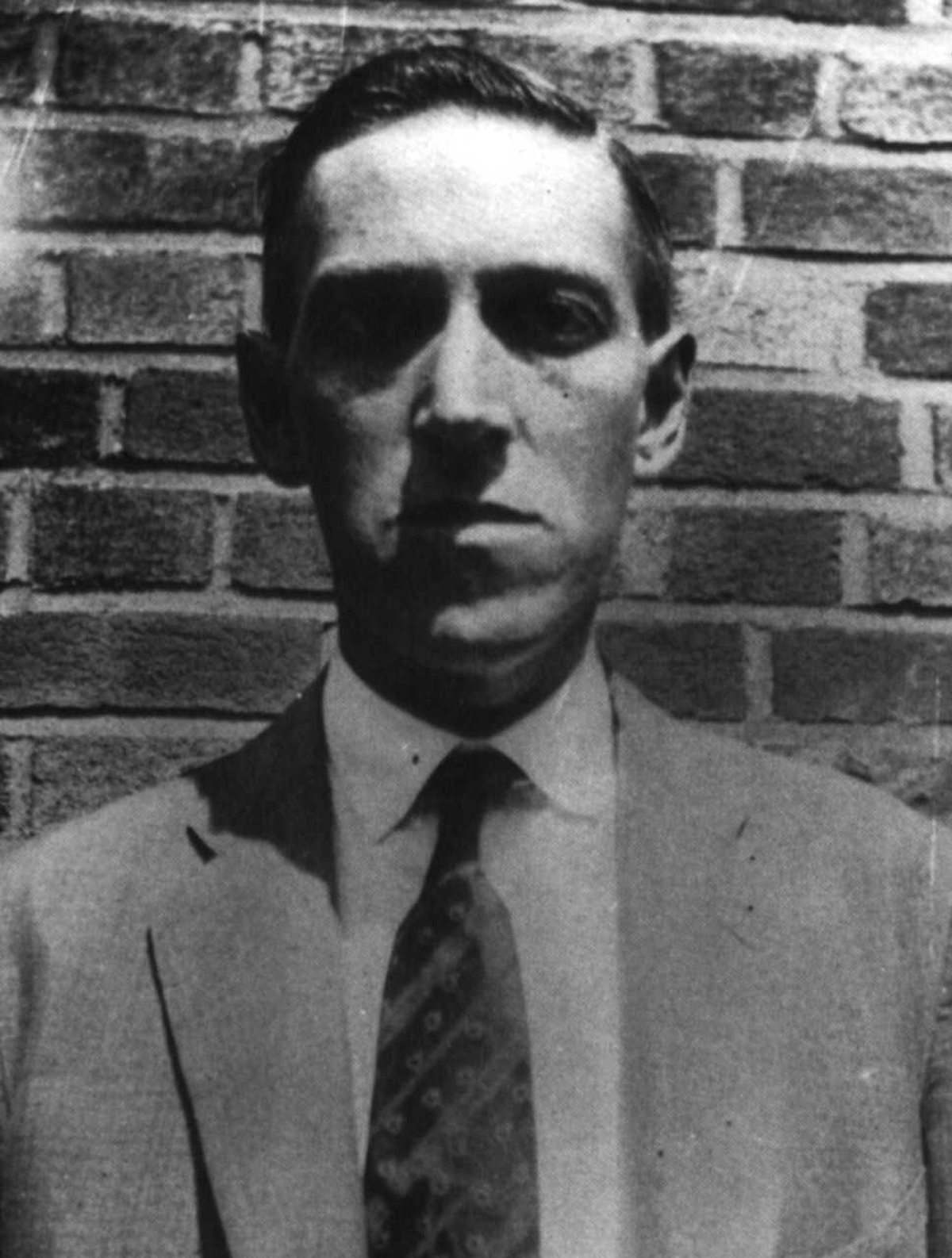
H. P. Lovecraft on July 11, 1931

In "The Whisperer in Darkness", narrator Albert Wilmarth initially dismisses those who believe that nonhuman creatures inhabit the Vermont hills as "merely romanticists who insisted on trying to transfer to real life the fantastic lore of lurking 'little people' made popular by the magnificent horror-fiction of Arthur Machen." This line, Lovecraft scholar Robert M. Price argues, is an acknowledgement of the debt Lovecraft's story owes to Machen's The Novel of the Black Seal (1895). He writes:

I would go so far as to make essentially a rewriting, a new version of Machen's. In both cases we have a professor, an antiquarian, following his avocational interests in what most would dismiss as superstition on a dangerous expedition into a strange region of ominous domed hills. He is lured by a curiously engraved black stone which seems a survival from an elder prehuman race now hidden in those mysterious hills. ... Lovecraft splits the role of Machen's Professor Gregg between Professor Wilmarth and the scholarly recluse Akeley. ... [I]t is Akeley, not the Professor, who eventually disappears into the clutches of the elder race. Wilmarth remains behind to tell the tale, like Machen's Miss Lally.

Price points out parallel passages in the two stories: Where Machen asks, "What if the obscure and horrible race of the hills still survived...?" Lovecraft hints at "a hidden race of monstrous beings which lurked somewhere among the remoter hills". Where Machen mentions "strange shapes gathering fast amidst the reeds, beside the wash in the river," Lovecraft tells of "certain odd stories of things found floating in some of the swollen rivers." Price suggests that Machen's reference to accounts of people "who vanished strangely from the earth" prompted Lovecraft to imagine people being literally spirited off the Earth.

As noted by critics like Price and Lin Carter, The Whisperer in Darkness also makes reference to names and concepts in Robert W. Chambers's The King in Yellow, some of which had previously been borrowed from Ambrose Bierce. In a letter to Clark Ashton Smith, Lovecraft wrote that "Chambers must have been impressed with 'An Inhabitant of Carcosa' & 'Haita the Shepherd', which were first published during his youth. But he even improves on Bierce in creating a shuddering background of horror—a vague, disquieting memory which makes one reluctant to use the faculty of recollection too vigorously."

The Vermont floods mentioned at the start of the story by Wilmarth, initiating his interest in the case, were a real natural disaster.

The idea of keeping a human brain alive in a jar (with mechanical attachments allowing sight, hearing, and speech) to enable travel in areas inhospitable to the body might have been inspired by the book The World, the Flesh, and the Devil by J. D. Bernal, which describes and suggests the feasibility of a similar device. The book was published in 1929, just a year before Lovecraft wrote his story.

== Significance ==
In addition to being a textbook example of Lovecraft's characteristically non-occult brand of horror, in an age when the genre consisted almost entirely of ghosts, vampires, goblins, and similar traditional tales, "Whisperer" is one of the earliest literary appearances of the now-cliché concept of an isolated brain (although the alien brain case is not transparent as with later cinematic examples of this trope).

The story retains some seemingly supernatural elements, such as its claim that the alien fungi, although visible to the naked eye and physically tangible, do not register on photographic plates and instead produce an image of the background absent the creature (an impossibility by any known laws of optics, though a trait commonly attributed to vampires), although the story does mention that this is possibly due to the creatures' fungoid and alien structure which works differently from any known physical organism. It is stated that the electrons of these fungoid aliens possess a different vibrational frequency that would require the development of a novel technique by a chemist in order to record their image.

== Reception ==
In a letter to the January 1932 Weird Tales, Donald Wandrei praised The Whisperer in Darkness, as well as "The Seeds of Death" by David H. Keller and the stories of Clark Ashton Smith. Robert Weinberg claimed the story's ending was "predictable". However, Weinberg also praised "the detailed buildup" of The Whisperer in Darkness, arguing it created "the superb mood that needed no surprise to make it a classic of fantastic horror".

== Adaptations ==
- The H. P. Lovecraft Historical Society has produced a film version made like a 1930s horror film, which premiered at the 2011 Seattle International Film Festival. Sandy Petersen, author of the Call of Cthulhu role-playing game, contributed financially to the film in order to finish its production.
- A video game adaptation by Nathaniel Nelson (writer, designer, programmer), Quincy Bowen (artist) and Mark Sparling (composer, sound designer) was created in 2014 for The Public Domain Jam.
- In December 2019, BBC Radio 4 aired an adaptation of The Whisperer in Darkness as part of The Lovecraft Investigations, taking the form of a modern-day true crime podcast set in Suffolk, as a sequel to the 2018 adaptation of The Case of Charles Dexter Ward. The adaptation incorporates such elements of British folklore as neopaganism, numbers stations, and the Rendlesham Forest incident.

== Sources ==
=== Primary ===
- Lovecraft, Howard P. (1984) [1931]. "The Whisperer in Darkness". In S. T. Joshi (ed.). The Dunwich Horror and Others (9th corrected printing ed.). Sauk City, WI: Arkham House. ISBN 0-87054-037-8. Definitive version.

=== Secondary ===
- Pearsall, Anthony B. (2005). The Lovecraft Lexicon (1st ed.). Tempe, AZ: New Falcon Pub. ISBN 1-56184-129-3.
- Price, Robert M. (2001). Nameless Cults: The Cthulhu Mythos Fiction of Robert E. Howard (1st ed.). Chaosium, Inc. ISBN 1-56882-130-1.
