= Mi-Go =

Fictional race in H. P. Lovecraft's Cthulhu Mythos

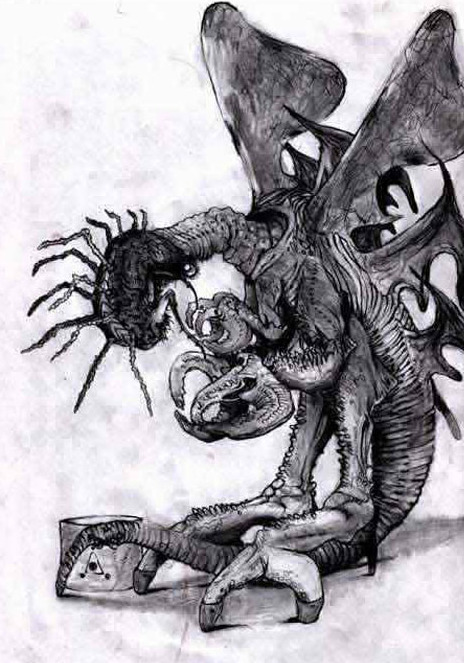
- Khannea SunTzu's interpretation of a Mi-Go
- First appearance: "The Whisperer in Darkness" (1931)
- Created by: H. P. Lovecraft

Mi-Go are a fictional race of extraterrestrials created by H. P. Lovecraft and used by others in the Cthulhu Mythos setting. The aliens are fungus-based lifeforms which are extremely varied due to their prodigious surgical, biological, chemical, and mechanical skill. The variants witnessed by the protagonist of "The Whisperer in Darkness" resemble winged human-sized crabs.

Mi-Go are first named as such in Lovecraft's short story "The Whisperer in Darkness" (1931). However, since they are described in this story as "fungi" that come "from Yuggoth," they can be considered an elaboration on earlier references to alien vegetation on dream-worlds in Lovecraft's sonnet cycle Fungi from Yuggoth (1929–30).

== Description ==
The Mi-Go are large, pinkish, fungoid, crustacean-like entities the size of a man; where a head would be, they have a "convoluted ellipsoid" composed of pyramided, fleshy rings and covered in antennae. They are about five feet (1.5 m) long, and their crustacean-like bodies bear numerous sets of paired appendages. They possess a pair of membranous fin-like wings which are used to fly through the "aether" of outer space. The wings do not function well on Earth. Several other races in Lovecraft's Mythos also have wings like these.

In the original short story, the creatures cannot be recorded using ordinary photographic film, due to their bodies being formed from otherworldly matter.

They are capable of going into suspended animation until softened and reheated by the sun or some other source of heat.

The Mi-Go can transport humans from Earth to Pluto (and beyond) and back again by removing the subject's living brain and placing it into a "brain cylinder", which can be attached to external devices to allow it to see, hear, and speak.

In "The Whisperer in Darkness" the Mi-Go are heard to give praise to Nyarlathotep and Shub-Niggurath, suggesting some form of worship. Their moral system is completely alien, making them seem highly malicious from a human perspective.

One of the moons of Yuggoth holds designs that are sacred to the Mi-Go; these are useful in various processes mentioned in the Necronomicon. It is said that transcriptions of these designs can be sensed by the Mi-Go, and those possessing them shall be hunted down by the few remaining on Earth.

The narrator of "The Whisperer in Darkness" learns that, ostensibly, a group known as the Brotherhood of the Yellow Sign is dedicated to hunting down and exterminating the fungoid threat, though it is unknown if this is actually true since it was given as a pat explanation for the Mi-Go remaining hidden. The name "Hastur" is mentioned in passing among several other places and things, and was eventually applied to a god-like alien being by August Derleth, who gave Hastur the title "Him Who Is Not to Be Named". However, in Lovecraft's story, a human ally of the Mi-Go mentions "Him Who Is Not to Be Named" in the list of honored entities along with Nyarlathotep and Shub-Niggurath, and "Hastur" in connection with the cult of the Yellow Sign opposing the Mi-Go's work on Earth. Lovecraft never made a connection between Hastur and "Him Who Is Not to Be Named", and indeed did not even imply Hastur was a being; Derleth was the one to do so.
