= List of Cthulhu Mythos characters =

Fictional characters in H. P. Lovecraft's Cthulhu Mythos story cycle

The following characters appear in H. P. Lovecraft's story cycle — the Cthulhu Mythos.

Overview:

- Name. The name of the character appears first.
- Birth/Death. The date of the character's birth and death (if known) appears in parentheses below the character's name. Ambivalent dates are denoted by a question mark.
- Description. A brief description of the character follows next.

Contents:	A B C D E F G H I J K L M N P R S T U V W Y Z

== A ==
=== Alhazred, Abdul ===
(655?–738)

The infamous "mad Arab" credited as the author of Al-Azif (the Necronomicon). He is first mentioned in Lovecraft's "The Nameless City". See Abdul Alhazred.

=== Akeley, George Goodenough ===
The son of Henry Wentworth Akeley. See "The Whisperer in Darkness".

=== Akeley, Henry Wentworth ===
(c. 1871–??)

Vermont folklorist and correspondent of Albert Wilmarth who becomes involved with the Fungi from Yuggoth. See "The Whisperer in Darkness".

=== Allen, Zadok ===
(c. 1831–1926?)

One of the few completely human residents of Innsmouth. Despite very advanced age, he apparently does not die a natural death, but is dealt with in the uproar set off by the narrator. See "The Shadow Over Innsmouth".

=== Angell, George Gammell ===
(1857–November 23, 1926)

A Professor Emeritus of Semitic languages at Brown University who researches the worldwide Cthulhu cult. See "The Call of Cthulhu".

=== Armitage, Dr. Henry ===
(1855–1939/1946?)

Chief librarian at Miskatonic University who confronted the Dunwich Horror. See "The Dunwich Horror".

=== Ashley, Professor Ferdinand C. ===
Professor of ancient history at Miskatonic University, mentioned in "The Shadow Out of Time".

=== Atal ===
Resident of Ulthar in the Dreamlands. See "The Other Gods".

=== Atwood, Professor ===
( ?? – 1930–31)

Professor of physics at Miskatonic University who accompanied Professor William Dyer on the disastrous Pabodie Expedition to Antarctica in 1930–31 chronicled in At the Mountains of Madness in which he dies with Professor Lake.

== B ==
=== Barzai (the Wise) ===
Barzai is high-priest of the Gods of Earth (the Great Ones) in Ulthar and one-time teacher of Atal. See "The Other Gods".

=== Billington, Alijah ===
Alijah Billington is the heir to Richard Billington's estate in the early 19th century. See The Lurker at the Threshold.

=== Blake, Robert Harrison ===
A fictional horror writer. See Robert Harrison Blake.

=== Blayne, Horvath ===
(c. 1925–1948)

A character from August Derleth's 1952 story "The Black Island". Upon being given the Elder Sign by Shrewsbury, he feels an unpleasant sensation from it, and soon realizes that he has Deep One ancestry.

=== Bowen, Enoch ===
Bowen is a renowned occultist and archaeologist who lived in Providence, Rhode Island. See "The Haunter of the Dark".

=== Bran Mak Morn ===
(?–c. 210)

In the fiction of Robert E. Howard, the last king of the Picts. See Bran Mak Morn.

== C ==
=== Carter, Randolph ===
(1873–1928?)

Boston author, occultist, and legendary "dreamer". See Randolph Carter.

=== Castaigne, Hildred ===
A New York City resident who after a head injury becomes obsessed with the play The King in Yellow, even producing a translation. He is institutionalized at an asylum for the criminally insane after he tries to kill his brother's fiancée.

=== Castro ===
An aged sailor and Cthulhu cultist. See "The Call of Cthulhu".

=== Chalmers, Halpin ===
(1891–July 3, 1928)

Mystic, esteemed writer of horror fiction, and the victim of a gruesome, unsolved murder. He was born in Partridgeville, New York and was a graduate of Miskatonic University, class of 1918. Later he became the Curator of Archaeology at the Manhattan Museum of Fine Arts in Brooklyn. After Chalmers' death, his fiction became hugely popular. His most famous work is The Secret Watcher (London's Charnel House Press). Posthumous publications about Chalmers include The Collected Letters of Halpin Chalmers and Halpin Chalmers: Voyager of Other and Many Dimensions, a biography by Fred Carstairs.

=== Chandraputra, Swami Sunand ===
Disguise of Randolph Carter.

=== Clarendon, Dr. Alfred ===
An American physician who had dreamed of conquering fever and ended up a murderous servant of inhuman powers.

=== Colum, Nayland ===
A London writer who vanishes from a ship bringing him home from Arabia. See The Trail of Cthulhu.

=== Copeland, Harold Hadley ===
(c. 1860–May 15, 1926)

A scholar who appears in the fiction of Lin Carter, starting with "The Dweller in the Tomb". See Xothic legend cycle.

=== Corsi, Bartolomeo ===
A 12th century Florentine monk and body-swapped victim of the Great Race of Yith.

=== Crom-Ya ===
(15,000 BC)

Cimmerian chief, worshipper of Tsathoggua, and body-swapped victim of the Great Race.

=== Crow, Titus ===
(1916–1968?)

Crow is the protagonist of a series of Mythos stories written by Brian Lumley, first appearing in 1970's "Billy's Oak". He is a British occult researcher and psychic dedicated to combating the Cthulhu Cycle Deities. See Titus Crow.

=== Crucian, Robert ===
(1972-????)

Introduced by writer Jason Bengston, a former military police officer, and part-time librarian. See Robert Crucian.

=== Curwen, Joseph ===
(1663–1771)

In Lovecraft's novel The Case of Charles Dexter Ward, Curwen is a necromancer who comes back to corporeal existence through his descendant Charles Dexter Ward.

== D ==
=== Danforth ===
Graduate student at Miskatonic University who accompanies the ill-fated Pabodie Expedition to Antarctica. See At the Mountains of Madness.

=== Davenport, Eli ===
Vermont folklorist who recounts the legend of a race of strange beings that dwelt beneath the Vermont hills. See "The Whisperer in Darkness".

=== Davies, Chandler ===
(?–May ? 1962)

In the writings of Brian Lumley, a renowned British artist and friend of Titus Crow. His macabre paintings are legendary; foremost is his piece Stars and Faces. After his mistress burned his latest work, G'harne Landscape, he went mad with rage and was confined to Woodholme Sanitorium, where he died shortly thereafter.

=== De la Poer, Thomas ===
(c. 1855–?)The last of the De la Poer family, who, after rebuilding the infamous Exham Priory (the hated seat of his ancestors), moving in and exploring its cellars, went mad and died in Hanwell Asylum. See The Rats in the Walls.

=== De Marigny, Étienne-Laurent ===
New Orleans occultist.

=== De Marigny, Henri-Laurent ===
(1923–)

Son of Étienne-Laurent de Marigny and New Orleans mystic. In the 1930s, his father sent him to England, where he became the inseparable colleague of Titus Crow.

=== Derby, Edward Pickman ===
(1890–1933)

Poet and husband of Asenath Waite. See "The Thing on the Doorstep".

=== d'Erlette, Comte ===
Title of a French aristocrat and the fictional author of Cultes des Goules, inspired by the ancestral form of Mythos author August Derleth's name. The fictional writer is first mentioned in Robert Bloch's 1935 story "The Suicide in the Study", which calls his book "ghastly". Lovecraft uses the name in two 1935 stories, "The Shadow Out of Time" and "Haunter of the Dark", the latter of which calls d'Erlette's work "infamous". Derleth himself refers to d'Erlette in "The Adventure of the Six Silver Spiders" (1950) and "The Black Island" (1952).

Eddy C. Bertin's 1976 "Darkness, My Name Is", presenting the Comte's given name as Francois-Honore Balfour, describes Cultes des Goules as "rather disappointing because its author had possessed more fantasy than knowledge about the hideous things he was writing about."

=== Dewart, Ambrose ===
A reclusive descendant of Alijah Billington and scholar in Arkham. See The Lurker at the Threshold.

=== Dexter, (Doctor) Ambrose ===
Ambrose Dexter removed the Shining Trapezohedron and a group of dangerous grimoires from the Church of Starry Wisdom after the death of Robert Blake; when trying to get rid of the stone was possessed by the Haunter, and became a human puppet for Nyarlathotep to live within as a nuclear scientist. See "The Haunter of the Dark".

=== Du Nord, Gespard ===
Wizard in 13th century Averoigne. He is believed to have translated the Greek version of the Book of Eibon into French c. 1240.

=== Dyer, William ===
(c. 1875–?)

Professor of geology at Miskatonic University and leader of the disastrous Pabodie Expedition to Antarctica in 1930–31. In 1935, he accompanied an expedition to Australia's Great Sandy Desert to search for the ruins of a primordial civilization.

== E ==
=== E-poh ===
Wizened leader of the Tcho-Tcho people, possibly killed when Alaozar was destroyed by the Elder Gods. He was well over seven thousand years old and led the cult of Zhar and Lloigor.

=== Eibon ===
Renowned wizard of Hyperborea, author of the Book of Eibon, and worshiper of Tsathoggua.

=== Eldin the Wanderer ===
(?–1979)

Companion of David Hero on his adventures in the Dreamlands. In the waking world, he was Leonard Dingle, a professor of psychology and anthropology and dream researcher. After he died, he became a permanent resident of the Dreamlands and remains one of its most prominent figures. He now serves at the pleasure of King Kuranes of Celephaïs.

=== Elton, Basil ===
(c. 1870–?)

Custodian of the North Point Lighthouse and traveler of the Dreamlands. He lost his dream-self during his quest for unknown Cathuria.

=== Exior K'Mool ===
Third most powerful wizard of Theem'hdra, after his master Mylakhrion and Teh Atht. Like his former master, he tried to attain immortality by making a bargain with the Great Old Ones. However, his home and the ruined city of Humquass were destroyed when Nyarlathotep arrived to deal with him in person.

== F ==
=== Feery, Joachim ===
(?–1934)

Occultist and author of Notes on the Cthäat Aquadingen and Notes on the Necronomicon.

Also used as an alternate name by Robert M. Price.

=== Franklyn, Roland ===
(?–1967)

In the writings of Ramsey Campbell, the leader of a cult in Brichester, England in the mid-1960s. In January 1964, he published his cult's dogma in We Pass From View (True Light Press). Among the claims made in the book is that the deceased must be cremated in order for the soul to be reincarnated. Otherwise, the "burrowers of the core may drag off his body from the grave with him still in it to the feast of Eihort." The late Roland Franklyn himself, alas, was not cremated.

== G ==
=== Geoffrey, Justin ===
An English poet who died in a lunatic asylum. Some years before, his already frail psyche had been warped by looking for too long at the Black Stone of legend near the village of Stregoicavar. He never witnessed the annual, nocturnal rite of 24 June. The narrator in "The Black Stone" mentions that if he had, he would have become insane much earlier. His poetry is used as prelude in The Thing on the Roof and his backstory was explored in the unfinished story, The House. Here it was revealed that Geoffrey came from a family of merchants with no interest in art or poetry. The fragment suggests that Justin's insanity began when, as a child, he went to sleep one summer night beside a long-abandoned, sinister-looking farmhouse. Afterwards, he developed an increasingly violent temper (in contrast to his family's well known friendliness and sociability) as well as the habit of sneaking out of the house late at night to go exploring. Justin left home at the age of 17, after reluctantly completing high school. The Thing on the Doorstep reveals that Geoffrey was a correspondent of Edward Derby and gives the year of his death as 1926. See "The Black Stone"

=== Gilman, Walter ===
(?–May 1, 1928)

See "The Dreams in the Witch House".

=== Gordon, Edgar Hengist ===
In Robert Bloch's [1936] short story "The Dark Demon", Gordon is a failed writer of horror fiction who disappeared under mysterious circumstances. His morbid writings (such as "Gargoyle", "The Principle of Evil", Night-Gaunt, and The Soul of Chaos) were said to drive away readers and publishers alike.

=== Grimlan, John ===
(March 10, 1630?–March 10, 1930)

Made a pact with Malik Tous, the Prince of Darkness, for 250 years of life.

=== Gustau, Thelred ===
(?–1972) Published Legends of the Olden Runes, based on translated documents written by Teh Atht, preserved in a golden box cast up by the eruption of Surtsey. Disappeared in a mysterious "explosion."

== H ==
=== Hero, David ===
A Dreamer, in the Dreamlands. Once mortal, he died and was reborn in the Dreamlands.

=== Hoag, (Captain) Abner Exekiel ===
(1697–?)

A sea captain in the Lin Carter story "The Dweller in the Tomb".

=== Hutchinson, Edward ===
True name of Baron Ferenczy of Transylvania.

== I ==
=== Ibn Schacabao ===
Wizard mentioned in the Necronomicon.

== J ==
=== Johansen, Gustaf ===
(??–1925)

A Norwegian sailor who encounters Cthulhu. Unlike his companions, he manages to survive both physically and mentally, and returns home – only to be murdered most subtly by a member of the Cthulhu cult. "The Call of Cthulhu".

== K ==
=== Klarkash-Ton ===
Atlantean high-priest credited with recording the "Commoriom myth-cycle" of ancient Hyperborea. (The name is Lovecraft's pun for his friend and correspondent Clark Ashton Smith.)

=== Keane, Abel ===
An assistant of Laban Shrewsbury who mysteriously disappeared. See The Trail of Cthulhu.

=== Kirowan, (Professor) John ===
Professor John Kirowan is often partnered with the character John Conrad, to the extent that these stories are often referred to under the group title Conrad & Kirowan. Professor Kirowan is a younger son of a titled Irish family and a scholar of the Mythos who travelled widely in search of forbidden knowledge. His ancestor, Sir Michael Kirowan was a medieval knight famous for killing a particularly fierce and notorious villain, whose ghost Kirowan will meet and escape from.

In Budapest he studied with a man called Yosef Vrolok but refused to "descend to the foul depths of forbidden occultism and diabolism to which [he] sank". In revenge, Vrolok used his "vile arts" to turn" the only woman Kirowan ever loved", against him and "debauched" her. In order to have his own revenge, Kirowan travelled the world seeking greater knowledge of the occult but became sickened by what he learned and renounced this knowledge. In later life he joined the Wanderer's Club, "which is composed of the drift of the world, travelers, eccentrics, and all manner of men whose paths lie outside the beaten tracks of life." The story The Haunter of the Ring provides much of Kirowan's background as well as establishing a link to Howard's Conan stories. The ring of the title is Thoth-Amon's Serpent Ring of Set, first mentioned in the short story The Phoenix on the Sword. Kirowan states that it has been "handed down by foul cults of sorcerers since the days of forgotten Stygia."

=== Kuranes ===
A king in the Dreamlands, originally a hobo in the waking world. See Kuranes.

== L ==
=== Lake, Prof. ===
( ?? – 1930–31)

A professor of biology at Miskatonic University. Member of the Pabodie Antarctic expedition.

=== Lapham, Seneca ===
A professor of anthropology at Miskatonic University who investigated the death of Ambrose Dewart. See The Lurker at the Threshold.

=== Legrasse, John Raymond ===
In Lovecraft's "The Call of Cthulhu", Legrasse is a New Orleans police inspector who investigated the Cthulhu cult. See "The Call of Cthulhu".

=== Lillibridge, Edwin M. ===
An inquisitive reporter for the Providence Telegram who disappears in 1893 – as it turns out, inside the Free-Will Church where the Church of Starry Wisdom sect holds its services. His remains are discovered by Robert Blake when he investigates the abandoned building. See The Haunter of the Dark

=== LLanfer, (Doctor) Cyrus ===
(?–c. 1950)

A chief librarian of Miskatonic University Library who first appears in August Derleth's "The Return of Hastur". After graduating from the university in 1902, he became the assistant director of the library and later took over Henry Armitage's post some time before 1936. He is noteworthy for compiling "The Sorcerer's Apprentice", a huge catalog of the arcane books kept in the Special Collections department.

=== Luveh-Keraphf ===
The mad high priest of Bast during Egypt's 13th Dynasty and writer of the Black Rites. The name is Robert Bloch's homage to Lovecraft.

== M ==
=== Marsh, Obadiah ===
A sea captain and the founder of the Esoteric Order of Dagon in Innsmouth. See "The Shadow Over Innsmouth".

=== Mason, Keziah ===
See "The Dreams in the Witch House".

=== Misquamacus ===
See The Lurker at the Threshold.

=== Morgan, (Professor) Francis ===
Professor of Medicine and Comparative Anatomy (or Archaeology) at Miskatonic University who helped defeat the Dunwich Horror. See "The Dunwich Horror".

=== Mülder, (Doctor & Professor) Gottfried ===
(? – 1858?)

Scientist and travel-companion of von Junzt. Wrote the foreword to Unaussprechlichen Kulten as well as The Secret Mysteries of Asia, with a Commentary on the Ghorl Nigräl .

=== Mylakhrion ===
Most powerful wizard of Theem'hdra. He attained immortality by making a bargain with the Great Old One Cthulhu. He was killed by Cthulhu after attempting to renege on the agreement. Lived in Humquass and Tharamoon.

== N ==
=== Nephren-Ka ===
The Black Pharaoh, an insane pharaoh who secured the Shining Trapezohedron for Egypt, but after being convinced by the resident Haunter of the Dark, he had a lightless temple created to hold the stone and the deity within. That temple became a center of abominable happenings, and the rites carried out there were so monstrous the temple was destroyed and the Pharaoh's name was struck from all records and monuments. The Pharaoh was controlled by the cruel god Nyarlathotep, of whom the Haunter of the Dark was likely an avatar.

== P ==
=== Peaslee, Nathaniel Wingate ===
In Lovecraft's "The Shadow Out of Time", a professor of Political Economy at Miskatonic University and one-time victim of the Great Race of Yith. See "The Shadow Out of Time". He was killed in the epilogue of The Transition of Titus Crow in the aftermath of Project X's unsuccessful attempt to kill Cthylla.

=== Phelan, Andrew ===
(c. 1910–1938?)

One-time assistant of Laban Shrewsbury. See The Trail of Cthulhu.

=== Philetas, Theodorus ===
(c. 950)

A fictional Greek scholar from Constantinople, Byzantine Empire. In 950AD, Philetas translated Al Hazred's Kitab Al Azif into Greek and gave it the title Necronomicon.

=== Phillips, Ward (1) ===
First president of the institution later known as Miskatonic University and one of the three instructors at the school. In 1693, he donated the first books to what would become Miskatonic's famed library.

=== Phillips, Ward (2) ===
Reverend of the Second Church (later First Baptist Church) of Arkham and author of Thaumaturgical Prodigies in the New-England Canaan. See The Lurker at the Threshold.

=== Phillips, Ward (3) ===
Aged writer of pulp fiction in Providence, Rhode Island and friend of Randolph Carter. (The character is based on Lovecraft, hence the name.)

=== Phillips, Winfield ===
(1907–1937)

=== Pickman, Richard Upton ===
(?–1926?)

Renowned Boston painter infamous for his ghoulish works. In 1926, he vanished from his home (though years later he resurfaced as a ghoul in the Dreamlands). See "Pickman's Model".

=== Pott, Johannes Henricus ===
(1692–1777)

German chemist, see Johann Heinrich Pott

=== Prinn, Abigail ===
(?–December 14, 1690)

In Henry Kuttner's "The Salem Horror", an alleged witch and self-proclaimed high priestess of Nyogtha in Salem, Massachusetts. She died mysteriously before the Salem witch trials began. Fearing she had cursed the town, superstitious colonists drove a stake through her heart before burying her. She may be a descendant of Ludwig Prinn.

She rose from the dead to summon Nyogtha and attack the protagonist of The Salem Horror.

=== Prinn, Ludwig ===
(?–1542)

Sorcerer and author of De Vermis Mysteriis.

== R ==
=== Rice, (Professor) Warren ===
Professor of Classical Languages at Miskatonic University and a member of the famous trio that defeated the Dunwich Horror. See "The Dunwich Horror".

== S ==
=== Schrach, Gerhard ===
Character in Hero of Dreams (Lumley)

=== Shrewsbury, Laban ===
(1864–1938?)

An anthropologist and professor of philosophy at Miskatonic University who disappeared for twenty years, only to be presumed killed in a house fire shortly after his reappearance. See The Trail of Cthulhu.

=== Silberhutte, Hank ===
A telepath from Texas with the ability to sense the minds of alien beings. In 1966, he joined the Wilmarth Foundation to help fight the Cthulhu Cycle Deities (the Great Old Ones). He is introduced in Brian Lumley's The Burrowers Beneath and reappears on his own in Spawn of the Winds and In the Moons of Borea as well as a guest-appearance in Elysia.

=== Sincaul, Cyprian ===
In Clark Ashton Smith's "The Hunters From Beyond" (1932), Sincaul is a renowned San Francisco sculptor with a reputation for producing morbid works. He also appears in Lin Carter's "Out of the Ages".

=== Smith, Japhet ===
An agent of the Cthulhu cult. See The Trail of Cthulhu.

=== Smith, Morgan ===
Occult scholar and author of the seminal Sign of the Skull.

=== Surama ===
Humanoid teacher and collaborator of Dr Clarendon. Surama was perhaps a serpent man.

== T ==
=== Thurston, Francis Wayland ===
The grand-nephew of George Angell, who discovers the secret of the Cthulhu Cult while going through his late uncle's papers. See "The Call of Cthulhu".

=== Tuttle, Amos ===
(?–1937?)

Miskatonic Library benefactor, collector of the Tuttle Celaeno Fragments and the R'leyh Text.

=== T'yog ===
In "Out of the Aeons", ghostwritten by Lovecraft, T'yog is high priest of Shub-Niggurath and sorcerer in the province of K'naa in ancient Mu. He sought to challenge the power of Ghatanothoa by confronting the god in its lair on Yaddith-Gho. To protect himself from the god's medusa-like ability, he prepared a special scroll. T'yog was defeated when Ghatanothoa's priests replaced his scroll with a fake.

He also appears in Lin Carter's "The Thing in the Pit".

=== Typer, Alonzo Hasbrouch ===
(1855–1908)

Came to and disappeared in Chorazin, N.Y., and his diary was found in 1935. See The Diary of Alonzo Typer

== U ==
=== Undercliffe, Errol ===
(c. 1937–1967?)

Enigmatic writer of horror fiction in Brichester, England. He disappeared in 1967 after looking into the death of Roland Franklyn. His stories appear in two collections: The Man Who Feared to Sleep and Photographed by Lightning. His correspondent Ramsey Campbell (whose story "The Stocking" Undercliffe dismissed as "elaborately pointless") paid tribute to him in Demons by Daylight, and noted that a Korean director, Harry Chang, was to film some of Undercliffe's stories under the title Red Dreams.

=== Upton, Daniel ===
(c. 1884–?)

Character in The Thing on the Doorstep. Father of Edward Derby Upton.

== V ==
=== Von Junzt, Friedrich Wilhelm ===
The author of the Unaussprechlichen Kulten (Nameless Cults). See The Black Stone.

== W ==
=== Waite, Asenath ===
(1905–1932)

In Lovecraft's "The Thing on the Doorstep", she is the daughter and victim of Ephraim Waite. She is the only female student of Miskatonic University mentioned.

=== Waite, Ephraim ===
In Lovecraft's "The Thing on the Doorstep", he is the father of Asenath Waite who later possessed her body.

=== Walmsley, Gordon (of Goole) ===
Author and expert in the science of ciphers

=== Ward, Charles Dexter ===
(1902–1928?)

See The Case of Charles Dexter Ward.

=== Warren, Harley ===
Occult friend of Randolph Carter and victim of unknown forces. See Harley Warren.

=== Webb, William Channing ===
An explorer and professor of Anthropology at Princeton University who encountered the Cthulhu Cult in Greenland. See "The Call of Cthulhu".

=== Wendy-Smith, Sir Amery ===
(?–1933)

Archaeologist, explorer, and author of the G'harne Fragments.

=== West, Herbert ===
Miskatonic University medical student who experimented with the reanimation of corpses. See "Herbert West-Reanimator".

=== Whateley, Lavinia ===
(c. 1878–October 31, 1926?)

Albino daughter of Noah Whateley. See "The Dunwich Horror".

=== Whateley, (Wizard) Noah ===
(?–August 1, 1924)

Backwoods farmer and reputed sorcerer. See "The Dunwich Horror".

=== Whateley, Wilbur ===
(February 2, 1913–August 3, 1928)

Son of Lavinia Whateley and Yog-Sothoth. See "The Dunwich Horror".

=== Wilmarth, Albert N. ===
Folklorist and assistant professor of English at Miskatonic University who investigated strange events in Vermont. See "The Whisperer in Darkness".

=== Wormius, Olaus ===
A man who prepared the Latin edition of the Necronomicon during the eleventh century. See Ole Worm.

== Y ==
=== Yakthoob ===
In Lin Carter's 1971 short story "The Doom of Yakthoob", the title character is a wizard who apprenticed the young Abdul Alhazred. He perishes horribly during an ill-fated summoning of a demon.

== Z ==
=== Zamacona Y Nuñez, Panfilio De ===
(c. 1512–?)

In the 1940 Zealia Bishop short story "The Mound", ghost-written by Lovecraft, Zamacona Y Nuñez is a Spanish conquistador who accompanied Coronado on an excursion into the New World. After Coronado turned back in 1541, Zamacona continued into what is now Oklahoma searching for a lost city of gold. Instead, he discovers the underground realm of K'n-yan., After living with the increasingly inhuman people of K'n-yan for a few years, he attempts escape, but is betrayed by a pack-beast. A second attempt ends horribly with him captured, and made into a mutilated zombie monster guarding the mound entrance referred to in the story's title.

=== Zanthu ===
Appears in "The Dweller in the Tomb", RF, "The Thing in the Pit", WF

Muvian sorcerer, author of the Zanthu Tablets.

=== Zarnak, (Doctor) Anton ===
Occult detective

=== Zon Mezzamalech ===
A wizard of Hyperborea, ancient even in Eibon's time, who sought through a mysterious cloudy crystal, the secrets guarded by the mindless Ubbo-Sathla, spawner of all earthly life. He and the crystal both disappear.
