= The Trail of Cthulhu =

Series of short stories by August Derleth

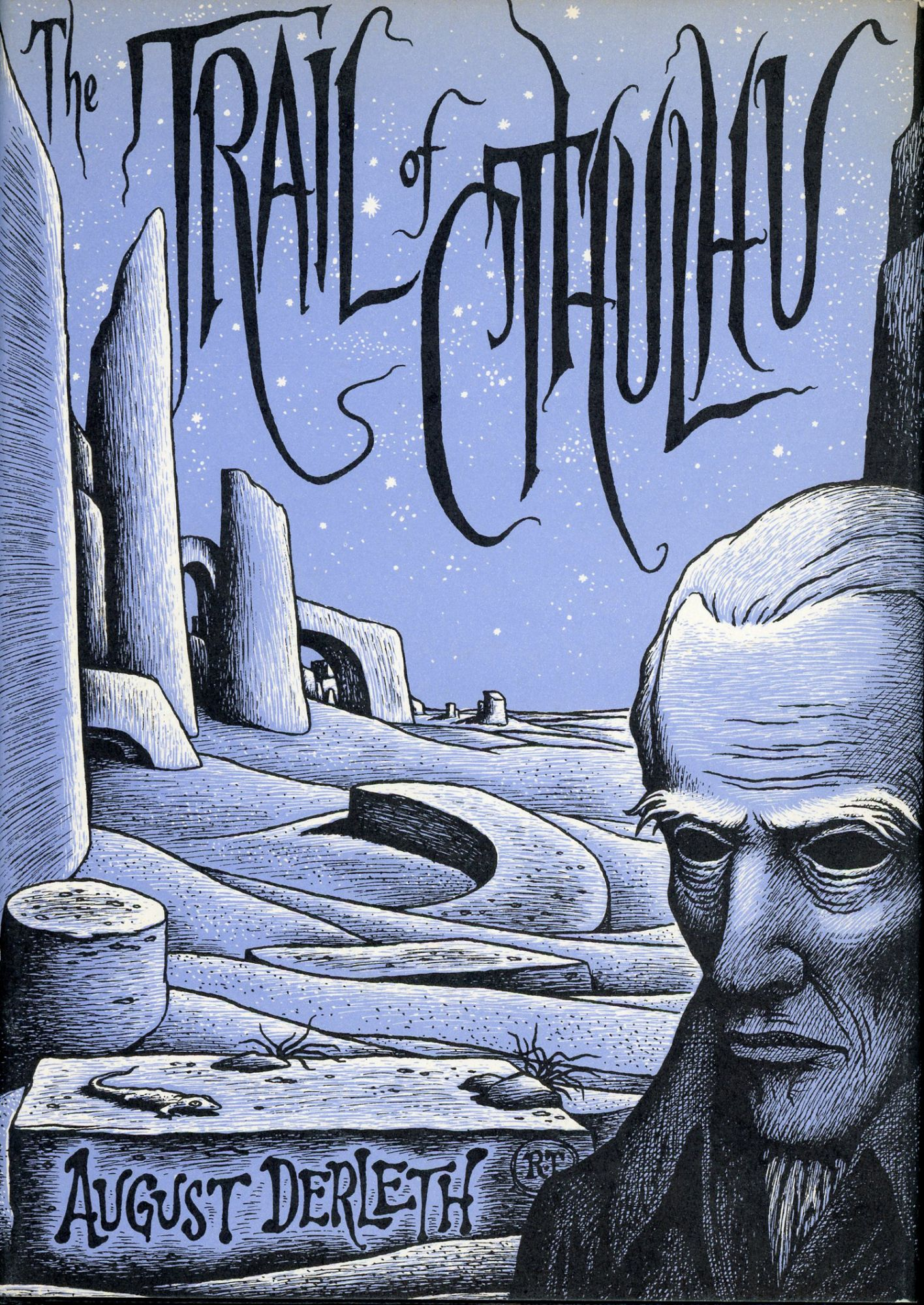
- Dust jacket illustration by Richard Taylor.
- Author: August Derleth
- Cover artist: Richard Taylor
- Language: English
- Genre: Fantasy, horror
- Publisher: Arkham House
- Publication date: 1962
- Publication place: United States
- Media type: Print (hardback)
- Pages: 248

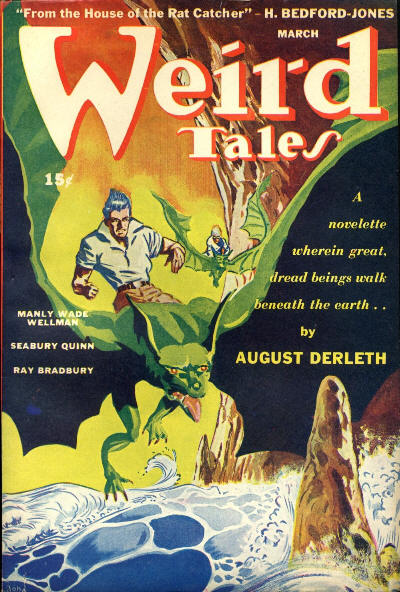
On its original publication, the story "The Trail of Cthulhu" was cover-featured in the March 1944 Weird Tales.

The Trail of Cthulhu is a series of interconnected short stories by American writer August Derleth as part of the Cthulhu Mythos genre of horror fiction. The stories chronicle the struggles of Laban Shrewsbury and his companions against the Great Old Ones, particularly Cthulhu.

The stories were originally published in Weird Tales from 1944 to 1952, and were republished in collected form as The Trail of Cthulhu by Arkham House in 1962 in an edition of 2,470 copies.

== Contents ==
The stories, with their date of first publication, are:

- "The House on Curwen Street" ("The Trail of Cthulhu") (March 1944)
- "The Watcher from the Sky" (July 1945)
- "The Gorge Beyond Salapunco" ("The Testament of Claiborne Boyd") (March 1949)
- "The Keeper of the Key" (May 1951)
- "The Black Island" (January 1952)
- "A Note on the Cthulhu Mythos"

== Characters ==
=== Laban Shrewsbury ===
The main character of The Trail of Cthulhu who is introduced in "The House on Curwen Street", Laban Shrewsbury is an anthropologist and professor of philosophy at Miskatonic University. Although he was born in Wisconsin, Shrewsbury spent most of his life in Arkham, Massachusetts. After publishing his first book, the controversial Investigation into the Myth-Patterns of the Latter-Day Primitives with Especial Reference to the R'lyeh Text, in 1915, Shrewsbury mysteriously disappeared. Shortly thereafter, a posthumous collection of his writings, titled Cthulhu Among the Victorians, saw publication.

Just as mysteriously, Shrewsbury reappeared 20 years later and immediately began work on his next book, Cthulhu in the Necronomicon. Before he could complete this work, however, his home in Arkham was destroyed by an inexplicable fire in 1938. Shrewsbury was presumed dead and his unfinished volume was published as a posthumous work.

Shrewsbury had actually escaped to Celaeno, fleeing certain Mythos horrors. Shrewsbury's manuscript, the Celaeno Fragments, remains under lock and key at Miskatonic's library.

Shrewsbury also appears in Phillip O. Marsh's 1994 novel The Worm Shall Ye Fight!.

Asked if Shrewsbury was a model for his character Titus Crow, Mythos author Brian Lumley replied: "No, for I was never too keen on him. I like to see a man (or character) build as he goes....Shrewsbury seemed to come life-size right from square one."

A character not unlike Dr. Laban Shrewsbury appears in Derleth's earlier non-Mythos story, A Matter of Sight, published in the January 1930 issue of Weird Tales.

=== Andrew Phelan ===
A one-time assistant of Laban Shrewsbury, he first appears in "The House on Curwen Street" and is the main character of "The Watcher from The Sky". He also makes a reappearance in "The Black Island".

=== Abel Keane ===
An assistant of Laban Shrewsbury who first appears in "The Watcher from the Sky", and also appears in "The Black Island". He was a Boston divinity student from New Hampshire who mysteriously disappeared after becoming involved with Andrew Phelan, a former tenant of his residence. At the end of "The Black Island", the final story in the sequence, he is murdered by Deep Ones.

=== Clairborne Boyd ===
Appears in "The Gorge Beyond Salapunco".

=== Nayland Colum ===
In "The Keeper of the Key", Colum is a London writer who vanishes from a ship bringing him home from Arabia. His best-known work is the novel The Watchers from the Other Side, to which he was planning a sequel at the time of his disappearance.

=== Japhet Smith ===
In "The Gorge Beyond Salapunco", Smith is an agent of the Cthulhu cult who pursued Clairborne Boyd to Lima, Peru.

== Critical reception ==
E. F. Bleiler commented on the book in The Guide to Supernatural Fiction (1983): "Much superior to the shoddy work in The Mask of Cthulhu, but by no means equal to Lovecraft’s original formulations. Too much Sax Rohmer."

== Sources ==
- Jaffery, Sheldon (1989). The Arkham House Companion. Mercer Island, WA: Starmont House, Inc. p. 63. ISBN 1-55742-005-X.
- Chalker, Jack L.; Owings, Mark (1998). The Science-Fantasy Publishers: A Bibliographic History, 1923-1998. Westminster, MD and Baltimore: Mirage Press, Ltd. p. 39.
- Joshi, S.T. (1999). Sixty Years of Arkham House: A History and Bibliography. Sauk City, WI: Arkham House. p. 78. ISBN 0-87054-176-5.
- Nielsen, Leon (2004). Arkham House Books: A Collector's Guide. Jefferson, NC and London: McFarland & Company, Inc. p. 86. ISBN 0-7864-1785-4.
