= Xothic legend cycle =

Series of short stories by American writer Lin Carter

The Xothic legend cycle is a series of short stories by American writer Lin Carter that are based on the Cthulhu Mythos of H. P. Lovecraft, primarily on Lovecraft's stories "The Call of Cthulhu" and "Out of the Aeons".

The cycle is centered on a trinity of deities said to be the "sons" of Cthulhu: Ghatanothoa, Ythogtha, and Zoth-Ommog. The five stories that make up the cycle (in chronological order) are "The Dweller in the Tomb" (1971), "Out of the Ages" (1975), "The Horror in the Gallery" (1976), "The Thing in the Pit" (1980), and "The Winfield Heritance" (1981). All these stories are to be found collected, with others, in The Xothic Legend Cycle: The Complete Mythos Fiction of Lin Carter (Chaosium, 1997)

Originally Carter had assembled some of these stories for a volume he planned to call The Terror Out of Time. Stories to have been included in this collection included "The Dweller in the Tomb" (to have been renamed "Zanthu"); "The Winfield Inheritance"; "Zoth-Ommog" (to be renamed "The Terror Out of Time"); "Out of the Ages" and "Them From Outside." The collection was submitted to DAW Books and Arkham House but was unpublished in Carter's lifetime. "Zoth-Ommog" (originally titled "The Horror in the Gallery") was published in the original DAW Books edition of Edward Berlund, ed, The Disciples of Cthulhu (see Cthulhu Mythos anthology) but was omitted from the Chaosium reprint of this anthology; however, the story appears under its original title in The Xothic Legend Cycle: The Complete Mythos Fiction of Lin Carter. "Them from Outside" was scheduled to appear in an issue of Crypt of Cthulhu as "Concerning Them from Outside".

The cycle introduces various mythos elements, such as the Zanthu Tablets, the Ponape Scripture, Father Ubb and the yuggs, and two new Great Old Ones: Ythogtha and Zoth-Ommog. The cycle also features the (fictional) Sanbourne Institute of Pacific Antiquities—perhaps Lin Carter's answer to Lovecraft's Miskatonic University. The lost continent of Mu also figures prominently in the cycle, as do the events that led to its sinking.

== The Demon Trinity ==
Carter's "Demon Trinity" (Ghatanothoa, Ythogtha, and Zoth-Ommog) were spawned on a planet near the double star Xoth. They are the progeny of a mating between Cthulhu and Idh-yaa, his first mate.

=== Ghatanothoa ===
Ghatanothoa (Lord of the Volcano) is said to be the firstborn of Cthulhu. He is infamous for his horrid appearance, and fearsome medusa-like ability, which causes a viewer's skin to become hard and leathery but preserves the brain, leaving the victim to go slowly mad trapped within an immobile shell. Aliens from Yuggoth built a colossal fortress atop the mountain Yaddith-Gho in K'naa in the lost continent of Mu, and sealed Ghatanothoa below it beneath a vast trapdoor. Among the myriad deities worshipped in Mu, Ghatanothoa was the most respected as well as the most feared. Prior to the destruction of Mu, Ghatanothoa's cult became the most powerful on the continent, though opposed by the priests of Shub-Niggurath.

Ghatanothoa first appeared in Lovecraft's story ghostwritten for Hazel Heald, "Out of the Aeons".

=== Ythogtha ===
Ythogtha (The Thing in the Pit) is the second son of Cthulhu and resembles a gigantic, humanoid frog, or Deep One, with only a single eye in the center of his forehead, like a cyclops. A dense mane and a beard of writhing tentacles grows from his head. Although never fully described in Carter's own stories, Ythogtha is incredibly large; when the sorcerer-priest Zanthu attempts to free Ythogtha from his prison, he mistakes his god's clawed, slimy fingertips for mountainous heads.

The Elder Gods imprisoned Ythogtha in the Abyss of Yhe. He is served by the planarian-like yuggs and their lord, Ubb, The Father of Worms. Ythogtha's legend is chronicled in the Zanthu Tablets.

=== Zoth-Ommog ===
Zoth-Ommog (The Dweller in the Depths) is the third son of Cthulhu. He has a cone-shaped body, a razor-fanged reptilian head, like that of a Tyrannosaurus rex, four broad, flat, starfish-like arms with suckers, and a mane of tentacles. How he swims or walks on the ocean floor is unknown, but it is possible that he has a slug-like foot similar to that of the Great Race of Yith.

Zoth-Ommog was imprisoned by the Elder Gods beneath the seabed, near Ponape and R'lyeh. Like his older brother, Ythogtha, Zoth-Ommog is served by Father Ubb and the Yuggs. Zoth-Ommog's legend is chronicled in the R'lyeh Text and the Ponape Scripture.

(The Elder Gods as punishers of the Old Ones (a God and Satan theme) was not a Lovecraftian invention, but was introduced into the Mythos by August Derleth and carried on by a multitude of other Mythos authors, most notably Brian Lumley and Lin Carter.)

== Sanbourne Institute of Pacific Antiquities ==
The Sanbourne Institute of Pacific Antiquities is featured in "The Dweller in the Tomb" (where it debuted), "Out of the Ages", and "The Horror in the Gallery". The institute is an anthropological research facility dedicated to the study of the cultures of the Pacific. It is based in Santiago, California and was founded by the son of the late Calton Sanborne II, whose father was a magnate in the tuna-packing industry.

== Stories ==
Each story is set in the early 20th century and is told from the point of view of a scholarly narrator. Each narrator in turn becomes the protagonist of the next story in the series. A full synopsis of the stories are available.

=== "The Dweller in the Tomb" ===
The first story in the cycle introduces Harold Hadley Copeland, a noted archaeologist in the study of Pacific culture. The story is narrated by Henry Stephenson Blaine, Ph.D. and curator of the Manuscripts Collection of the Sanbourne Institute. The story consists primarily of the journal entries of Professor Copeland and details the ill-fated Copeland-Ellington Expedition into Central Asia in 1913, of which Copeland was the only survivor.

=== "Out of the Ages" ===
This story introduces the "Xothic Legend Cycle", a theory first proposed by Harold Hadley Copeland. The story also features the "Ponape Figurine", a sinister statuette depicting Zoth-Ommog, the Dweller in the Deeps.

=== "The Horror in the Gallery" ===
This story (originally titled "Zoth-Ommog") revolves around the Ponape Figurine and the efforts of the protagonist to dispose of it. The story features Lovecraft's Miskatonic University.

In the story, Zoth-Ommog, like his father, Cthulhu, can enter a person's dreams and cause the victim to go mad — but to do so, the subject must be near one of his statues. One such statue is recovered from the seafloor of Ponape and brought to Professor Harold Hadley Copeland, a brilliant but eccentric archaeologist, who is researching the Xothic Legend Cycle.

After Professor Copeland dies in a psychiatric hospital, the statue is taken to the Sanbourne Institute of Pacific Antiquities to be displayed. The press dubs it the "Ponape Figurine," though rumors claim it is cursed. However, unbeknownst to the museum's Curator of Manuscript Collections, Dr. Henry Stephenson Blaine, the statue is sentient (much like the One Ring in The Lord of the Rings) and soon drives him insane.

One night, a Deep One, disguised as a sailor, breaks into the institute to steal the figurine. After killing the night watchman, the Deep One is about to take the statue when he is interrupted by Dr. Blaine's young aide, Arthur Wilcox Hodgkins. Hodgkins flings an Elder Sign "star stone" at the statue, destroying it. The resulting explosion also kills the Deep One.

As fate would have it, Hodgkins is charged with the murder of the night watchman, because the body of the Deep One had dissolved into a pool of slime and soon evaporated just a few hours later, leaving no trace, except for some badly charred clothing. Hodgkins is judged incurably insane and is confined to the Dunhill Institute, where his mentor and close friend, Dr. Blaine, is also incarcerated. As a final twist, Hodgkins is dubbed the "last victim [of the] Curse of the Ponape Figurine."

=== "The Thing in the Pit" ===
The fourth story in the cycle chronicles the events that led to the destruction of Mu. Zanthu, the high priest of Ythogtha, plots to depose the cult of Ghatanothoa, after his priests outlawed all other religions in Mu. The cult of Ghatanothoa was the dominant religion in Mu following the defeat of T'yog, high priest of Shub-Niggurath, who had sought to vanquish the tyranny of Ghatanothoa forever.

Zanthu had hoped to oust Ghatanothoa's cult by freeing the god Ythogtha from the Abyss of Yhe, where the Elder Gods had imprisoned him. This act of blasphemy did not go unnoticed by the Elder Gods, who destroyed Mu and sank it beneath the sea. Zanthu himself abandoned the ritual and fled after discovering the true nature of the god, whose size is measurable only in miles.

Following the destruction of Mu, Zanthu and his followers fled to the Plateau of Tsang in Inner Mongolia, where they later died. Before his death, Zanthu inscribed his story on the Zanthu Tablets, a series of ten or twelve black jade slabs, which also included the sacred rituals and mysteries of Ythogtha.

=== "The Winfield Heritance" ===
The final story in the cycle is only loosely tied to the other four. This story reveals the true nature of the yuggs. The hero of The Lurker at the Threshold becomes a mythos worshipper in this tale.

== See also ==
- Zoth Ommog Records, a real-life record label

== Bibliography ==
- Carter, Lin.
  - August Derleth, ed. (1971). "The Dweller in the Tomb". Dark Things. Sauk City, WI: Arkham House.
  - Gerald W Page, ed. (1975). "Out of the Ages". Nameless Places. Sauk City, WI: Arkham House. ISBN 0-87054-073-4.
  - "The Thing in the Pit". Lost Worlds. New York, NY: DAW Books. 1980. Archived from the original on 2007-05-29.
  - Lin Carter, ed. (1981). "The Winfield Heritance". Weird Tales #3. Zebra Books. ISBN 0-89083-803-8.
  - Edward P. Berglund, ed. (1976). "Zoth-Ommog". The Disciples of Cthulhu (1st ed.). New York, NY: DAW Books. Original title: "The Horror in the Gallery".
- Price, Robert M. (1997). The Xothic Legend Cycle: The Complete Mythos Fiction of Lin Carter. Oakland, CA: Chaosium. ISBN 1-56882-078-X. Includes the five stories listed above.

== Sources ==
- Harms, Daniel (1998). The Encyclopedia Cthulhiana (2nd ed.). Oakland, CA: Chaosium. ISBN 1-56882-119-0.
- Price, Robert M. (1981). "The Statement of Lin Carter—The Copeland Bequest". Crypt of Cthulhu. 1 (2). Archived from the original on 27 September 2007. Robert M. Price (ed.), Bloomfield, NJ: Cryptic Publications.
