= The Xothic Legend Cycle: The Complete Mythos Fiction of Lin Carter =

Collection of horror short stories by Lin Carter

- Cover of the first edition
- Author: Lin Carter
- Illustrator: Dave Carson
- Cover artist: H. E. Fassl
- Language: English
- Series: Cthulhu Cycle
- Genre: Fantasy, Horror
- Published: 1997 (Chaosium)
- Publication place: United States
- Media type: Print (paperback)
- Pages: xiv, 272
- ISBN: 1-56882-078-X
- OCLC: 39165493

The Xothic Legend Cycle: The Complete Mythos Fiction of Lin Carter is a collection of horror short stories by science fiction and fantasy author Lin Carter, edited by Robert M. Price. It gathers together his "Xothic" tales and some of his other Cthulhu Mythos writings. It was first published as a trade paperback by Chaosium in 1997 as book 13 of the publisher's "Cthulhu Cycle" series. The collection has also been translated into German.

== Summary ==
The book collects thirteen stories by Carter, two of them collaborative, his sonnet cycle "Dreams from R'lyeh" & an additional story by Price, all set in H. P. Lovecraft's Cthulhu Mythos, together with an introduction by Price.

"Dreams from R'lyeh" previously appeared in Carter's poetry collection of the same title, published by Arkham House in 1975.

== Contents ==
Contents

- "Introduction" (by Robert M. Price)
- "The Red Offering"
- "The Dweller in the Tomb"
- "The Thing in the Pit"
- "Out of the Ages"
- "The Horror in the Gallery"
- "The Winfield Heritance"
- "Perchance to Dream"
- "Strange Manuscript Found in the Vermont Woods"
- "Dreams from R'lyeh: A Sonnet Cycle"
- "Something in Moonlight"
- "The Fishers from Outside"
- "Behind the Mask"
- "The Strange Doom of Enos Harker" (with Robert M. Price)
- "The Bell in the Tower" (with H. P. Lovecraft)
- "The Soul of the Devil-Bought" (by Robert M. Price)

== See also ==
- Xothic legend cycle
