= The Other Gods =

1933 short story by H. P. Lovecraft

- Short story by H. P. Lovecraft
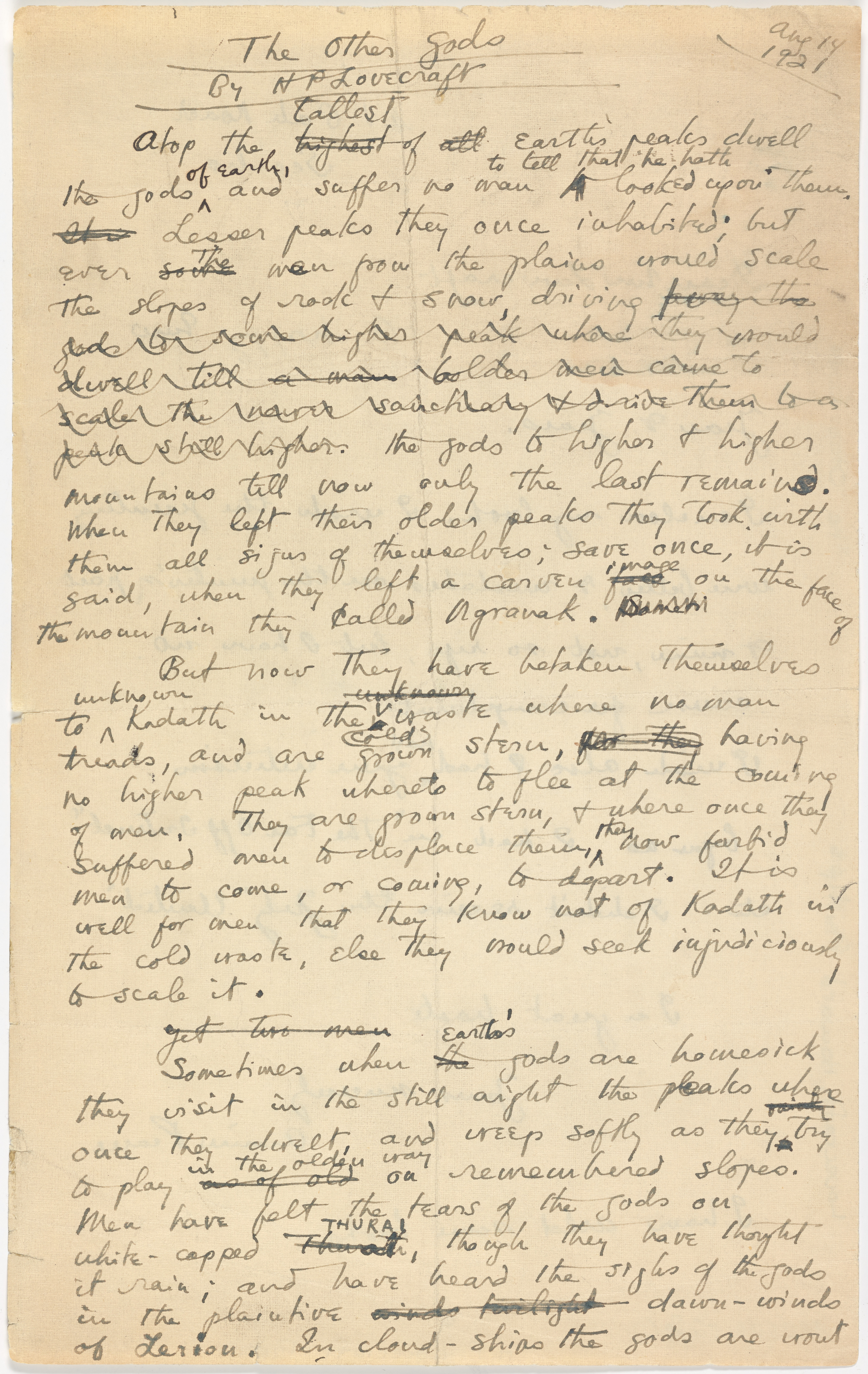
- Manuscript

Text available at Wikisource
- Country: United States
- Language: English
- Genre: Fantasy

Publication
- Published in: The Fantasy Fan
- Publication date: 1933

"The Other Gods" is a fantasy short story written by American author H. P. Lovecraft, on August 14, 1921. It was first published in the November 1933 issue of The Fantasy Fan.

== Plot ==
Barzai the Wise, a high priest and prophet greatly learned in the lore of the "gods of earth", or Great Ones, attempts to scale the mountain of Hatheg-Kla in order to look upon their faces, accompanied by his young disciple Atal. Upon reaching the peak, Barzai at first seems overjoyed until he finds that the "gods of the earth" are not there alone, but rather are overseen by the "other gods, the gods of the outer hells that guard the feeble gods of earth!" Atal flees, and Barzai is never seen again.

== Characters ==
=== Atal ===
Atal first appears in Lovecraft's "The Cats of Ulthar" (1920) as the young son of an innkeeper in Ulthar who witnesses the weird rites of the cats on the night that the old cotter and his wife are killed. In "The Other Gods", he becomes the apprentice of Barzai the Wise and accompanies him on his doomed climb to the top of Mount Hatheg-Kla to see the gods.

When Randolph Carter visits Atal in The Dream-Quest of Unknown Kadath (1926), he is the patriarch of the Temple of the Elder Ones and is now well over 300 years old, "but still very keen of mind and memory". After many draughts of moon-wine, he reveals an important piece of information that helps Carter in his quest. As befits his age and station, Atal sports a long beard.

=== Barzai ===
In "The Other Gods", Barzai the Wise is high-priest of the Gods of Earth (the Great Ones) in Ulthar and one-time teacher of Atal. According to the story, he often delved into the unknown, reading such works as the Pnakotic Manuscripts and the Seven Cryptical Books of Hsan. He is the son of an aristocrat, which makes him skeptical of commoners' superstitions. He is said to have advised the burgesses of Ulthar when they passed their ban on cat-slaying. He vanishes shortly after climbing to the top of Hatheg-Kla to see the gods reveling on its peak. In "The Dream Quest of Unknown Kadath", Nyarlathotep himself speaks to Randolph Carter in a brief and sardonic fashion of the ill-fated expeditions of other impertinent god-seekers, and therein relates that when Barzai's hubris brought him to the baleful attention of the Other Gods, they "did what was expected".

=== Sansu ===
According to the story, Sansu is "written of with fright" in the Pnakotic Manuscripts, having once scaled the mountain of Hatheg-Kla "in the youth of the world" and found "naught but wordless ice and rock". He is the last person to have climbed the mountain before Barzai.

== Setting ==
Though some readers assume that "The Other Gods" is set in Lovecraft's Dreamlands, critic S. T. Joshi points out the connections to the story "Polaris", which seems to be set in Earth's distant past, in arguing that "the clear implication is that this tale too takes place in a prehistoric civilization."

- Hatheg-Kla is a "high and rocky" mountain in the "stony desert" thirteen days' walk from the village of Hatheg, for which it is named. It is one of the places where the "gods of earth" once dwelt and sometimes return to when they are homesick.
- "White-capped Thurai" is another of the mountains where the gods of earth used to dwell. It is said that at Thurai men mistake the tears of the gods for rain.
- Lerion, whose "plaintive dawn-winds" are the sighs of the gods, is another mountain formerly inhabited by the gods. In The Dream-Quest of Unknown Kadath, Lerion is described as the source of the river Skai.
- Ulthar, the hometown of the story's main characters, was introduced in the story "The Cats of Ulthar". It is said to lie "beyond the river Skai" and to be a neighbour of Hatheg.
- Lovecraft mentions the mountain of Kadath for the first time in "The Other Gods"; the story is set up as an explanation of why the gods of earth removed themselves to "unknown Kadath in the cold waste where no man treads." Lovecraft's novel The Dream-Quest of Unknown Kadath involves Randolph Carter's attempt to reach Kadath in order to consult the gods.

In addition to Dream-Quest, the mysterious mountain is mentioned in several other Lovecraft stories, including "The Strange High House in the Mist", "The Dunwich Horror", and At the Mountains of Madness.

== Inspiration ==
The story resembles the many tales of hubris written by Lord Dunsany, like "The Revolt of the Home Gods" from The Gods of Pegana (1905).

== Connections ==
The Seven Cryptical Books of Hsan (misprinted as "...of Earth" in the story's original publication) appear for the first time in "The Other Gods". The Pnakotic Manuscripts make their second appearance in "The Other Gods", having been introduced in "Polaris", along with Lomar. Both later reappear in Dream-Quest.

== Sources ==
- S. T. Joshi, "The Real World and the Dream World in Lovecraft", The Horror of It All, Robert M. Price, ed.
