= List of Cthulhu Mythos books =

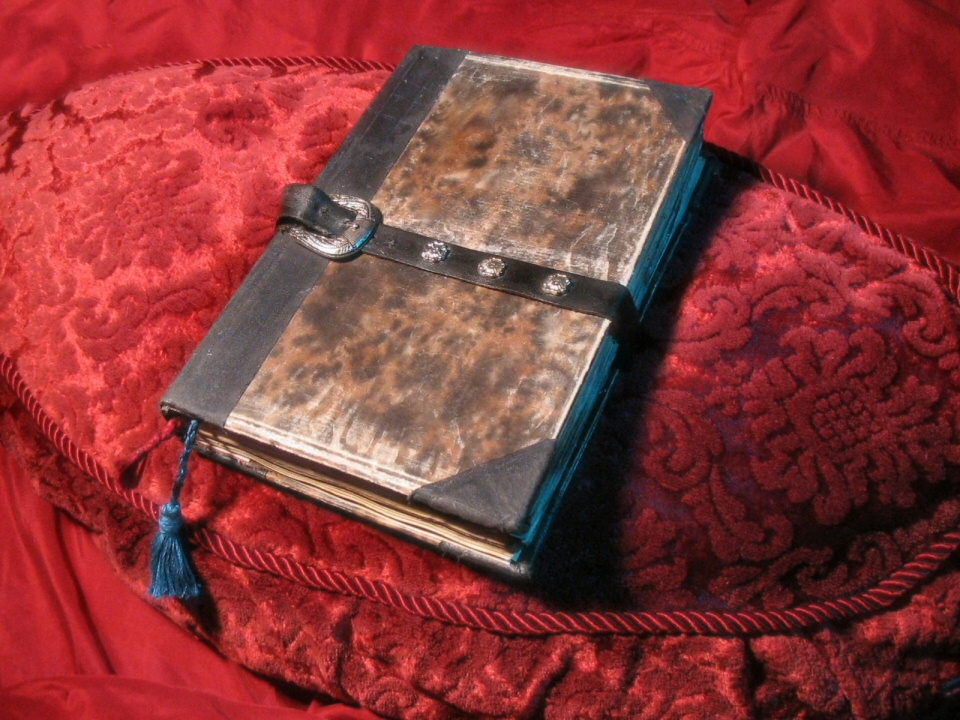
The most famous work appearing in the mythos is the Necronomicon.

Many fictional works of arcane literature appear in H. P. Lovecraft's cycle of interconnected works often known as the Cthulhu Mythos. The main literary purpose of these works is to explain how characters within the tales come by occult or esoterica (knowledge that is unknown to the general populace). However, in some cases the works themselves serve as an important plot device. For example, in Robert Bloch's tale "The Shambler from the Stars", characters inadvertently cast a spell from the arcane book De Vermis Mysteriis.

Another purpose of these fictional works was to give members of the Lovecraft Circle a means to pay homage to one another. Consequently, Clark Ashton Smith used Lovecraft's Necronomicon (his most prominent creation) in Smith's tale "Ubbo-Sathla". Likewise, Lovecraft used Robert E. Howard's Nameless Cults in his tale "Out of the Aeons". Thereafter, these fictional works and others appear in the stories of numerous other Mythos authors (some of whom have added their own grimoires to the literary arcana), including August Derleth, Lin Carter, Brian Lumley, Jonathan L. Howard, and Ramsey Campbell.

== B ==
=== Book of Azathoth ===
He must meet the Black Man, and go with them all to the throne of Azathoth at the centre of ultimate Chaos. That was what she said. He must sign in his own blood the book of Azathoth and take a new secret name now that his independent delvings had gone so far.
—H. P. Lovecraft, "The Dreams in the Witch House"

The Book of Azathoth is a creation of Lovecraft's. It is mentioned in "The Dreams in the Witch House" as a book harbored by Nyarlathotep in the form of the Black Man (or Satan). The protagonist, Walter Gilman, is forced to sign the book in his blood, pledging his soul to the Other Gods. The idea of this fictional book is likely based on classical descriptions of witch-cults, Satanic rites, and the signing away of souls.

Other authors have expanded on the Book of Azathoth. Michael Alan Nelson writes (in his Fall of Cthulhu series for Boom! Studios) that the signer attracts the attention of the Other Gods by writing their name in the book. Glynn Owen Barrass states (in The Starry Wisdom Library) that the Book of Azathoth praises the Lovecraftian pantheon and renounces/mocks the Christian scripture.

=== Book of Eibon ===
. . . The Book of Eibon, that strangest and rarest of occult forgotten volumes ... is said to have come down through a series of manifold translations from a prehistoric original written in the lost language of Hyperborea.
—Clark Ashton Smith, "Ubbo-Sathla"

The concept of Book of Eibon, or Liber Ivonis or Livre d'Eibon, is attributed to Clark Ashton Smith and can be said to be his equivalent of Lovecraft's Necronomicon. It appears in a number of Lovecraft's stories, such as "The Haunter of the Dark" (Liber Ivonis), "The Dreams in the Witch House" (Book of Eibon), "The Horror in the Museum" (Book of Eibon), "The Shadow Out of Time" (Book of Eibon) and "The Man of Stone", a collaboration with Hazel Heald (Book of Eibon).

Within these narratives, this book is supposed to have been written by Eibon, a wizard in the land of Hyperborea. It was an immense text of arcane knowledge that contained, among other things, a detailed account of Eibon's exploits, including his journeys to the Vale of Pnath and the planet Shaggai, his veneration rituals of Zhothaqquah (Eibon's patron deity), and his magical formulae—such as for the slaying of certain otherworldly horrors. In the lore of the Cthulhu Mythos, only one complete fragment of the original is known to exist, scattered in different places of our world, though there are translations in English, French, and Latin—Liber Ivonis is the title of the Latin translation.

Smith presents his short story "The Coming of the White Worm" as Chapter IX of the Book of Eibon.

Lin Carter wrote numerous "completions" or imitations of Clark Ashton Smith stories which purported to be various sections of the Book of Eibon.

Outside of Smith's and Lovecraft's mythoses, the book notably appears in Lucio Fulci's supernatural horror film The Beyond (1981), where inappropriate use of it opened up one of the seven gates of Hell, allowing its zombie-like denizens to cross over.

=== Book of Iod ===
The Book of Iod was created by Henry Kuttner and first appeared in his short story "Bells of Horror" (as Keith Hammond; 1939). The original Book of Iod is written in the "Ancient Tongue", possibly a combination of Greek and Coptic. While its origin is unknown within the narrative, the Book of Iod may have been written by the mysterious author "Khut-Nah", which sounds remarkably like Kuttner. The Book of Iod contains details about Iod, the Shining Hunter, Vorvados, and Zuchequon. According to the lore of the Cthulhu Mythos, the Huntington Library of San Marino, California is said to hold an expurgated translation, possibly in Latin, by Johann Negus.

The Book of Iod was also the title of a short-story collection published by Chaosium in 1995, containing 10 Cthulhu Mythos stories by Henry Kuttner, along with three related stories by Kuttner, Robert Bloch, Lin Carter, and Robert M. Price.

== C ==
=== Celaeno Fragments ===
The Celaeno Fragments is credited to August Derleth. In his novel The Trail of Cthulhu, "Celaeno" refers to a distant planet that contains a huge library of alien literature. The character Professor Laban Shrewsbury and his companions traveled to Celaeno several times to escape Cthulhu's minions. Later in the lore's timeline, Shrewsbury wrote the Celaeno Fragments, a transcript of what he remembered of his translations of the books in the Great Library of Celaeno. He submitted the transcript, which consisted of about 50 pages, to the Miskatonic University's library in 1915.

=== Cthäat Aquadingen ===
The Cthäat Aquadingen, possibly meaning Things of the Water (as aquadingen can be translated from Dutch as "water/aqua things"), was created by Brian Lumley for his short story "The Cyprus Shell" (1968). This fictional work, by an unnamed author, deals with Cthulhu and other sea-horrors, such as Inpesca. It also contains many so-called Sathlattae, rituals and spells related to Ubbo-Sathla. It is first mentioned as appearing in northern Germany around 400 AD. According the lore of the Cthulhu Mythos, a Latin version was written between the 11th and 12th century, as was an English translation that appeared sometime in the 14th century.

=== Cultes des Goules ===
Cultes des Goules, or Cults of Ghouls, was created by Robert Bloch (August Derleth claimed to have invented the fictional work, but this was denied by both Lovecraft and Bloch himself). The work is often misattributed to August Derleth because the fictional author is the "Comte d'Erlette". It is a book on black magic and the uses of the dead written by the character Francois-Honore Balfour (Comte d'Erlette) in 1702 of the lore's timeline. It was first published in France and later denounced by the church. Only a handful of copies exist in present day settings. One of the established copies was kept for 91 years in an arcane library of the Church of Starry Wisdom in Providence, Rhode Island. After Robert Blake’s mysterious death in 1935, Doctor Dexter removed the grimoire and added it to his library.

Cultes des Goules is mentioned numerous times in the works of Caitlin R. Kiernan and plays an especially important role in her 2003 novel Low Red Moon. The text is also prominently mentioned in her short story "Spindleshanks (New Orleans, 1956)"—collected in To Charles Fort, With Love (2005).

The book Cultes des Goules is also mentioned in passing as being part of a collection that was discovered in the titular castle in the 1981 novel The Keep, but does not appear in the 1983 film based on the book.

== D ==
=== De Vermis Mysteriis ===
De Vermis Mysteriis, or Mysteries of the Worm, was created by Robert Bloch, first appearing in Bloch's short story "The Secret in the Tomb" (Weird Tales, May 1935) and featured extensively in Bloch's "The Shambler from the Stars" (1935). The fictional grimoire was used by Stephen King in his short story "Jerusalem's Lot" and novel Revival.

=== Dhol Chants ===
The Dhol Chants was first mentioned in the short story "The Horror In The Museum" (1932) by Lovecraft and Hazel Heald. They are alluded to in passing as a semi-mythical collection of chants attributed to the almost-human people of Leng. The chants themselves are never described, nor do they appear in any other of Lovecraft's works. August Derleth later used the chants in his stories "The Gable Window" (1957), The Lurker at the Threshold (1945), and "The Shadow Out of Space" (1957).

According the lore of the Cthulhu Mythos, Miskatonic University's library is said to hold a copy of the Dhol Chants.

== E ==
=== Eltdown Shards ===
Richard F. Searight invented The Eltdown Shards in a head-note (which purported to be a quotation from this text) to his story "The Sealed Casket" (Weird Tales, March 1935). The story was actually published in that issue without the headnote. Lovecraft later quoted the unpublished headnote in a letter to Clark Ashton Smith, "leading some to believe that he wrote it". He cited the book in The Shadow Out of Time and The Challenge from Beyond.

The Eltdown Shards are mentioned in numerous mythos stories as mysterious pottery fragments found in 1882 and named after the place where they were discovered, Eltdown in southern England. In the lore timeline, the shards date to the Triassic period and are covered with strange symbols thought to be untranslatable. Nonetheless, several characters penned their own interpretations of the markings, including Gordon Whitney and his The Eltdown Shards: A Partial Translation. Many of these fictional works, as well as a number of non-academic versions, are mentioned in stories featuring secretive cults.

Whitney's translation is similar to the Pnakotic Manuscripts, a fictional text produced by the Great Race of Yith. The translation describes Yith, the planet from which the Great Race came, and the Great Race's fateful encounter with the Yekubians. A magical formula from the 19th shard is for the summoning of the "Warder of Knowledge"; unfortunately, the dismissal portion of the ritual is garbled, so the summoning of this being could prove calamitous. Despite its connections to the Great Race, lore of the Cthulhu Mythos has established that the Eltdown Shards were most likely inscribed by the Elder Things, who probably buried the ceramics in England when it was part of the great supercontinent Pangaea.

== G ==
=== G'harne Fragments ===
The G'harne Fragments first appeared in the works of Brian Lumley. They are described as a set of miraculously preserved shards of obsidian or some other black stone that record the history of the pre-human African city of G'harne. Within the Cthulhu Mythos, the lost city is located somewhere in the southern Sahara Desert, and is currently a frequent haunt of the chthonians.

The characters responsible for translating of the fragments are Sir Amery Wendy-Smith and Gordon Walmsley. Both of these scholars died in Lumley's works: Sir Amery in "Cement Surroundings" (1969) and Walmsley in "In the Vaults Beneath" (1971).

== K ==
=== The King in Yellow ===
A creation of Robert W. Chambers, The King in Yellow is a play featured in a collection of short stories also named The King in Yellow, published in 1895.

According to the stories, the play was widely censored. The author is unknown, and is believed to have committed suicide after publishing it in 1889. The play is named after a mysterious supernatural figure featured in it, who is connected to a peculiar alien symbol, usually wrought in gold, called the Yellow Sign. Though the first act is said to be "innocent", all who read the play's second act either go mad or suffer another terrible fate. Its setting and events include mysterious places and entities such as Carcosa, Hastur, and the Lake of Hali, names that Chambers borrowed from the writings of Ambrose Bierce.

Lovecraft was a fan of the book and included references to the Lake of Hali and the Yellow Sign in his short story "The Whisperer in Darkness" (1930). August Derleth later expanded on this connection in his own stories, rendering Hastur as an evil deity related to Cthulhu and the King In Yellow as one of his incarnations. Karl Edward Wagner and Joseph S. Pulver returned Chambers creations to their original cosmic horror roots. Both are great advocates of Chambers' work and have written many stories that utilize Chambers creations. Pulver also edited an anthology of Chambers inspired stories called A Season in Carcosa.

== L ==
=== Liber Ivonis ===
See Book of Eibon.

The Haunter of the Dark

== N ==
=== Necronomicon ===
The Necronomicon is arguably the most famous (or infamous) of Lovecraft's fictional works. It appears in a number of Lovecraft's stories, as well as in the writings of other authors.

== O ==
=== On the Sending Out of the Soul ===
On the Sending Out of the Soul appears in Henry Kuttner's short story "Hydra" (1939). It is described as an eight-page pamphlet on astral projection. The pamphlet appeared in Salem, Massachusetts, in 1783 of the lore's timeline and circulated among occult groups. Most copies were destroyed in the wake of a series of grisly murders.

The first seven pages of the pamphlet contain vague mystic writing; however, the eighth page details a formula for effecting astral travel. Among the required ingredients are a brazier and the drug Cannabis indica. The formula is always successful but has an unforeseen side effect: it invokes the horrid Outer God the Hydra.

== P ==
=== Parchments of Pnom ===
The Parchments of Pnom is a manuscript written by Hyperborea's leading genealogist and soothsayer. It is written in the "Elder Script" of that land and contains a detailed account of the lineage of the Hyperborean gods, most notably Tsathoggua.

=== Pnakotic Manuscripts ===
The Pnakotic Manuscripts were created by H. P. Lovecraft and first appeared in his short story "Polaris". They are noteworthy for being the first of Lovecraft's fictional arcane books. They were named after the place where it was kept, the city of Pnakotus, a primordial metropolis built by the Great Race of Yith. The Great Race is credited with authoring the Manuscripts, though other scribes would add to it over the ages. According to Lovecraft's story "The Other Gods", the Pnakotic Manuscripts originated in "frozen Lomar", a region in the Dreamlands.

F. Paul Wilson is among the authors who have referred to this collection in their own work; a collated version of the Manuscripts appears in Wilson's novel The Keep.

=== Poakotic Fragments ===
Also known as Puahotic Fragments mentioned in H. P. Lovecraft's ghost writing "The Horror in the Museum".

=== Ponape Scripture ===
The Ponape Scripture first appeared in Lin Carter's short story "Out of the Ages" (1975). The Scripture is a manuscript found in the Caroline Islands by Captain Abner Exekiel Hoag sometime around 1734. The book showed signs of great age—its pages were made of palm leaves and its binding was of an ancient, now-extinct cycadean wood. It was written in Naacal (the language of Mu) and appears to have been authored by Imash-Mo, high priest of Ghatanothoa, and his successors. The book contains details of Mu and of Zanthu, high priest of Ythogtha. With the help of his servant Yogash (hinted to be a Deep One hybrid), Hoag managed to write a translation of the manuscript. But when he tried to have it published, his efforts were thwarted by religious leaders who strongly objected to the book's references to Dagon. Nonetheless, copies of the Scripture have circulated among secretive cults (such as the Esoteric Order of Dagon) and other occult groups. After Hoag's death, his granddaughter, Beverly Hoag Adams, published an expurgated version of the book.

In contemporary times, other versions of the Ponape Scripture have seen print. Harold Hadley Copeland, a leading authority on the Scripture, produced a translation of the book, published in 1907 by Miskatonic University Press. Copeland also cited the book in his work The Prehistoric Pacific in Light of the 'Ponape Scripture (1911). The original version of the manuscript remains at the Kester Library in Salem, Massachusetts.

== R ==
=== Las Reglas de Ruina ===
Las Reglas de Ruina (literally "the Rules of Ruin") first appeared in Joseph S. Pulver's novel Nightmare's Disciple. It is a tome written by Philip of Navarre in 1520, a Spanish friar of the 16th century. The book has been translated in English by Professors Theodore Hayward Gates and Pascal Chevillion in 1714 and describes the Great Old One Kassogtha, sister and incestuous bride of Cthulhu. The book also foretells of the coming of a messiah of destruction, who would be born in the western land of the red savage across the great ocean in Columbus' New World, a man that shall set the Great Old One free from her stellar prison. Livia Llewellyn elaborated on this, describing the violent sexual acts committed by Kassogtha worshipers.

=== Revelations of Gla'aki ===
The Revelations of Gla'aki first appeared in Ramsey Campbell's short story "The Inhabitant of the Lake" (1964). It was written by a fictional undead cult worshipping the Great Old One Gla'aki. Within the lore of the Cthulu Mythos, whenever Gla'aki slept, the members of his cult had periods of free will, and, since they were part of Gla'aki and shared his memories, they wrote down what they remembered of their master's thoughts. The cult's handwritten manuscripts later came to be known as the Revelations of Gla'aki. The text originally contained 11 volumes, nine in the carefully abridged published edition, but the story implies it may have had more at different times in the past. Rumor has it that Mythos Scholar, Antonius Quine, once published a corrected edition of the Revelations of Gla'aki bound in a single volume.

== S ==
=== Seven Cryptical Books of Hsan ===
The Seven Cryptical Books of Hsan is a collection of writings mentioned by Lovecraft in "The Other Gods" (1921) and "The Dream-Quest of Unknown Kadath" (1926). In both stories, the books are mentioned in conjunction with the Pnakotic Manuscripts. They are kept in the temple of the Elder Ones in the city of Ulthar; these are the only copies existing in the current day of Lovecraft's stories. The character Barzai the Wise studied the books before his journey to see the gods dancing on Mount Hatheg-Kla, while another character, Randolph Carter, consulted them during his quest to reach Kadath.

The collection can be considered to be an analogue to the I Ching, a Chinese text of cosmology and divination.

== T ==
=== Testaments of Carnamagos ===
Now, as he sat there in a state half terror, half stupor, his eyes were drawn to the wizard volume before him: the writings of that evil sage and seer, Carnamagos, which had been recovered a thousand years ago from some Graeco-Bactrian tomb, and transcribed by an apostate monk in the original Greek, in the blood of an incubus-begotten monster. In that volume were the chronicles of great sorcerers of old, and the histories of demons earthly and ultra-cosmic, and the veritable spells by which the demons could be called up and controlled and dismissed.
—Clark Ashton Smith, "The Treader of the Dust"

The Testaments of Carnamagos was created by Clark Ashton Smith and first appeared in his short story "Xeethra" (1934). The text is featured more prominently in Smith's "The Treader of the Dust" (1935). Confusedly, Xeethra is set in the far distant future on Zothique, Earth's last continent, whereas "The Treader of the Dust" is set in (Smith's) current times.

The book gives a description of the Great Old One Quachil Uttaus, among others. Only two copies are known of, though one was destroyed during the Spanish Inquisition. The only remaining copy is bound in shagreen, and fastened with hasps of human bone.

== U ==
=== Unaussprechlichen Kulten ===
Unaussprechlichen Kulten was created by Robert E. Howard, and was ascribed to the fictional Friedrich von Junzt. Howard originally called the fictional book Nameless Cults, but both Lovecraft and Derleth gave it the German title which can translate to either Unspeakable Cults or Unpronounceable Cults (both meanings of the word are in common usage).

The name is grammatically incorrect. In proper German it would be named either Unaussprechliche Kulte or Von Unaussprechlichen Kulten (Of Unspeakable Cults).

== Z ==
=== Zanthu Tablets ===
The Zanthu Tablets first appeared in "The Dweller in the Tomb" (1971), by Lin Carter. The centerpiece of the story is the discovery of the tablets, which are an important part of Carter's Xothic legend cycle.

The tablets themselves are described as 12 engraved pieces of black jade inscribed by the fictional author Zanthu, a wizard and high priest of Ythogtha. They are written in a hieratic form of Naacal, the language of the fictional sunken continent of Mu. The tablets reveal a partial history of Mu, describing Zanthu's struggle against the rising cult of Ghatanothoa and his own religion's lamented decline. He also describes his failed attempt to release the god Ythogtha from its prison. Upon witnessing three black, beaked, slimy heads, "vaster than any mountain", rising from a gorge, he flees in terror when he realizes that they are merely the god's fingertips. According to Zanthu, he and some of his people escaped the destruction of Mu, which was sunk by the wrath of the Elder Gods.

The character Harold Hadley Copeland published a brochure entitled The Zanthu Tablets: A Conjectural Translation in 1916 of the lore timeline. He made the rough translation using a key borrowed from the estate of another character, Colonel Churchward, the last qualified translator of ancient Naacal, and heavily edited it out of a concern for "public sanity". The controversial brochure was later denounced by the academic community and was suppressed by the authorities. Published versions Copeland's later manuscripts have not appeared in any Cthulhu Mythos stories. According to current lore, ten years after the publication of the brochure, Copeland died in an asylum.

The following backstory is provided for how Copeland found the tablets. In 1913 of the lore timeline, guided by the Ponape Script, the character Copeland led an expedition into Indochina to locate the plateau of Tsang and to find the tomb of Zanthu. After the other members of the expedition died or deserted him, Copeland pressed on, eventually reaching his goal. Opening the tomb, he was horrified to discover that the mummified face of Zanthu resembled his own. Later wandering into a Mongolian outpost, a starving and raving Copeland was the only survivor of the expedition.

Carter's story "The Thing in the Pit" in his Lost Worlds purports to be a translation from the Zanthu Tablets.

=== Zhou Texts ===
A fictional ancient manuscript found in Asia, written during Zhou dynasty, circa in 1100 BC of the lore timeline. It contains the rituals to summon the Great Old One Kassogtha.

== Miscellaneous books ==
The following is a list of miscellaneous books—both real and fictitious—appearing in the Cthulhu Mythos. Along with the use of arcane literature, texts which innately possess supernatural powers or effects, there is also a strong tradition of fictional works or fictionalizing real works in the Mythos. The main literary purpose of books in the Mythos is to explain how characters within the tales come by occult or esoteric knowledge that is unknown to the general populace. However, in some cases the works themselves serve as important plot devices or simply opportunities for members of the Lovecraft Circle to pay homage to one another and other sources.

The following table is organized as follows:

- Title. The title of the work as it appears in the Cthulhu Mythos.
- Fict/Real. Fictitious works are denoted by F; real-life works by R.
- Author. The person or character credited as the author of the work. Authors of nonfictional works are real people. If the author is fictitious, the name of the writer who created the work appears in parentheses after the character's name. Surnames of Mythos writers are as follows:
  - Derleth = August Derleth
  - Bloch = Robert Bloch
  - Howard = Robert E. Howard
  - Lovecraft = H. P. Lovecraft
- Notes. A brief summary of the work.

=== A–D ===
Title	Fict/ Real	Author	Notes
An Investigation into Myth-Patterns of Latter-Day; Primitives with Especial Reference to the R'lyeh Text	F	Prof. Laban Shrewsbury (Derleth)	—
Ars Magna et Ultima	R	Ramon Llull (1235–1315)	Ars Magna et Ultima roughly translates to Universal Art. The proper title of this work is Ars Magna, Generalis et Ultima (1517).
Atlantis and the Lost Lemuria	R	William Scott-Elliot	This work is an omnibus volume, published in 1925, of the author's two earlier volumes, The Story of Atlantis (1896) and The Lost Lemuria (1904),
Azathoth and Other Horrors	F	Edward Pickman Derby (Lovecraft)	—
The Black Rites	F	Luveh-Keraphf (Bloch)	—
Book of Dzyan	R	Blavatsky	The Book of Dzyan purports to be an ancient text of Tibetan origin, but only came to light in the late 19th century and may be a forgery dating from that time.
Book of Hidden Things	F	—	Originally created by William Lumley in his draft version of The Diary of Alonzo Typer, the book was retained by Lovecraft when he revised the story, though it receives only passing mention.
Book of Thoth	F	—	A book from Egyptian mythology but an actual text in mythos stories.
Cabala of Saboth	F	(Robert Bloch)	First mentioned by name in "The Secret in the Tomb" (1935). According to Bloch's story "The Mannikin", it was published in a Greek translation in 1686.
Clavis Alchimiae	R	Robert Fludd (1574–1637)	An unpublished manuscript, copied by an amanuensis, and headed Declaratio breuis, &c., is in the Royal manuscripts, British Library, 12 C. ii. Fludd's Opera consists of his folios, not reprinted but collected and arranged in six volumes in 1638; appended is a Clavis Philosophiæ et Alchimiæ Fluddanæ, Frankfort, 1633.
Commentaries on Witchcraft	F	Mycroft (Bloch)	The fictitious author Mycroft may allude to Sherlock Holmes' brother, Mycroft Holmes.
Cryptomenysis Patefacta	R	John Falconer	The title of this work, first published in 1685, translates to "The Art of Secret Information Disclosed Without a Key". Lovecraft found this work in the entry on "Cryptography" in the ninth edition of the Encyclopædia Britannica and included it, along with other titles from the same article, in his story "The Dunwich Horror" (1929).
Cthulhu in the Necronomicon	F	Prof. Laban Shrewsbury (Derleth)	The work is Professor Shrewsbury's supposed sequel to his An Investigation into Myth-Patterns of Latter-Day Primitives. Shrewsbury's unfinished work was published posthumously following his alleged demise. The original manuscript is kept at the Miskatonic University library.
Daemonolatreia	R	Remigius	Remigius is the Latinized pen name for Nicholas Remy (1530–1612), an infamous French judge who presided over witchcraft trials. During a 15-year period, he convicted and sentenced to death about 900 reputed witches. His work, Daemonolatreia or Demonolatry, is a compendium of information about witchcraft, intended to be used for prosecuting alleged witches.
The Daemonolorum	F	(Bloch)	—
De Furtivis Literarum Notis	R	Giovanni Battista della Porta (1535?–1615)	The title means "On the Secret Symbols of Letters". Like Cryptomenysis Patefacta, Lovecraft found the work under "Cryptography" in the 20th century edition of Encyclopædia Britannica.
De Lapide Philosophico	R	Johannes Trithemius (1462–1516)	—
De Masticatione Mortuorum in Tumulis	F	Ranft [1734] (Bloch)	The title means "On the Eating of the Dead in the Tomb", a reference to a legend that claims that entombed corpses, driven by pangs of hunger, feed on their burial shrouds and even their own rotting flesh. Two real-life books share this title, one by Michael Ranft (1728) and the other by Philip Rehrius (1679).

=== G–P ===
Title	Fict/ Real	Author	Notes
Ghorl Nigral	F	(Willis Conover)	An invention of one of Lovecraft's correspondents.
Image du Monde	R	Gauthier de Metz	L'Image du monde (French, the image of the world) or Imago Mundi, an encyclopedic work about creation, the Earth and the universe, wherein facts are mixed with fantasy
Invocations to Dagon	F	(Derleth)	—
Key of Wisdom	R	Artephius	
Kryptographik	R	J.H. Klüber	A real book on cryptography, published 1809.
Liber Damnatus	F	(Lovecraft)	—
Liber Investigationis	R	Geber (c. 721 – c. 815)	Liber investigationis magisterii
Magyar Folklore	F	Dornly (Howard)	—
Marvells of Science	F	Morryster (Lovecraft)	Though mentioned by Lovecraft in "The Festival" (1925), the book was actually created by Ambrose Bierce in his story "The Man and the Snake" (1890).
Night-Gaunt	F	Edgar Hengist Gordon (Bloch)	—
Observations on the Several Parts of Africa	F	Sir Arthur Jermyn (Lovecraft)	Created by Lovecraft in "Facts Concerning the Late Arthur Jermyn and His Family" (1921).
Of Evill; Sorceries done in New-England of Daemons in no Humane Shape	F	(Lovecraft & Derleth)	—
Occultus	F	Heiriarchus (Bloch)	—
Polygraphia	R	Johannes Trithemius (1462–1516)	Another book on cryptography from the Encyclopædia Britannica that Lovecraft mentions in "The Dunwich Horror".

=== R–Z ===
Title	Fict/ Real	Author	Notes
Regnum Congo	R	Filippo Pigafetta	—
Remnants of Lost Empires	F	Otto Dostman (Howard)	—
Sadducismus Triumphatus	R	Joseph Glanvill	A revised edition was published in London in 1681.
The Saurian Age	F	Banfort (Lovecraft & Derleth)	—
The Seventh Book of Moses	R	(Derleth)	A work supposedly written by Moses that purports to be a lost book of the Bible. Lin Carter, referring to the Lewis de Claremont edition in his collection, called the work a "sloppy literary forgery".
The Soul of Chaos	F	Edgar Hengist Gordon (Bloch)	—
Sussex Manuscript	F	(Fred L. Pelton)	Pelton, a Lovecraft fan in Lincoln, Nebraska, wrote the work as an alleged English translation of the Necronomicon. Derleth, who was initially interested in the book and intended to publish it, mentioned it in his novel The Trail of Cthulhu to make it part of the mythos canon. Although Arkham House never published the work, it was printed in a special issue of Crypt of Cthulhu #63 (Eastertide 1989).
The Tablets of Nhing	F	(Lovecraft & E. Hoffman Price)	They are engraved tablets kept on the planet Yaddith which the wizard Zkauba consulted in "Through the Gates of the Silver Key" (1934).
Thaumaturgicall; Prodigies in the New-English Canaan	F	Rev. Ward Phillips (Lovecraft)	Although created by Lovecraft, the book is featured more prominently in Derleth's posthumous collaboration The Lurker at the Threshold (1945).
Thesaurus Chemicus	R(?)	Roger Bacon	Although Roger Bacon is cited as the writer of the work in The Case of Charles Dexter Ward, the provenance of Thesaurus Chemicus is not known. A similar work on alchemy, Speculum Alchemiae (1541), is credited to Bacon, though he may not have been its author.
Traicté des Chiffres	R	Blaise de Vigenère	Vigenère was a leading European authority on cryptography and wrote a similarly titled book, Traicté des Chiffres ou d'Escrire, which was published in Paris in 1586.
Turba Philosophorum	R	(Lovecraft)	A book of alchemy whose title means "Gathering of Philosophers", published in Basel in 1613.
The Witch-Cult in Western Europe	R	Dr. Margaret Alice Murray	Lovecraft cited this work as early as "The Horror at Red Hook" (1927).
We Pass From View	F	Roland Franklyn (Campbell)	—
Zohar	R	(Lovecraft)	Actual key work of Jewish kabbalism
