= Zhar (Great Old One) =

Zhar is a fictional deity in the Cthulhu Mythos. The being first appeared in the short story "The Lair of the Star-Spawn" (1932) by August Derleth and Mark Schorer. Zhar and its companion Lloigor are together known as the Twin Obscenities. Also, Lin Carter states that Zhar and Lloigor are both offsprings of Hastur and Shub-Niggurath. They are believed to be physically connected to its "twin", Lloigor, perhaps by a long extension of tentacles. In Derleth's classification system, both Zhar and Lloigor are air elementals, and they serve Hastur.

== Zhar in the mythos ==
Zhar is a Great Old One and appears as a colossal mass of tentacles. The being came from the star Arcturus, but now dwells beneath the buried city of Alaozar on the Plateau of Sung. It is served by a cult known as the Tcho-Tcho's "Brotherhood of the Star Treader." When called upon by the proper incantations, Zhar can project itself astrally in the form of the Tulku. It can also telepathically transmit its urges to its worshippers.

== Lloigor ==
Lloigor is another gargantuan monster that dwells beneath Alaozar with Zhar. Together, they are known as the Twin Obscenities. Lloigor appears as a titanic, winged mound of undulating tentacles and is also served by a cult known as the Tcho-Tcho's Brotherhood of the Star Treader. It has the power to control great winds, which it can use to snare and capture any unfortunates who chance upon it. Like Zhar, Lloigor can project its image whenever Arcturus (the star from whence it came) is in the sky.

A race of energy beings known as the Lloigor shares the same name with the eponymous Great Old One; however, there appears to be no connection between the two.

== Alaozar ==
Alaozar is a fabled, buried city on the mysterious Plateau of Sung in Burma (Sung is also believed to be an extension of the Plateau of Leng). The city is said to be located on the "Isle of Stars" within the "Lake of Dread". It is here where legends claim that beings from the stars arrived several millennia ago. Though the actual site has never been discovered, it is nonetheless venerated as a holy place by the Tcho-Tcho people because it is home to Zhar and Lloigor.
