= Polaris (short story) =

1920 short story by H. P. Lovecraft

- Short story by H. P. Lovecraft

Text available at Wikisource
- Country: United States
- Language: English
- Genres: Fantasy, weird fiction

Publication
- Published in: The Philosopher
- Publication date: December 1920

"Polaris" is a fantasy short story by American author H. P. Lovecraft, written in 1918 and first published in the December 1920 issue of the amateur journal The Philosopher. It is the story that introduces Lovecraft's fictional Pnakotic Manuscripts, the first of his arcane tomes.

In the story, an unnamed narrator describes his nightly obsession with the Pole star, and his recurring dreams of a city under siege. The narrator struggles with determining whether his reality is real, or if his dream is the true reality. Critics have noted autobiographical elements in the story, and have connected it with Lovecraft's experiences of uselessness during World War I.

== Plot ==
The story begins with the narrator describing the night sky as observed over long sleepless nights from his window, in particular that of the Pole Star, Polaris, which he describes as "winking hideously like an insane watching eye which strives to convey some strange message, yet recalls nothing save that it once had a message to convey".

He then describes the night of the aurora over his house in the swamp, and how on this night he first dreamed of a city of marble lying on a plateau between two peaks, with Polaris above in the night sky. The narrator describes after a while observing motion within the houses and seeing men beginning to populate the streets, conversing to each other in language that he had never heard before but still, strangely, understood. However, before he could learn any more of this city, he awoke.

Many times, he would again dream of the city and the men who dwelt within. After a while, the narrator becomes tired of merely existing as an incorporeal observer and desires to establish his place within the city, simultaneously beginning to question his conceptualization of what constituted reality and thus whether this was just a dream or whether it was real.

Then, one night, while listening to discourses of those who populate the city, the narrator obtains a physical form: not as a stranger, but as an inhabitant of the city, which he now knew as Olathoë, lying on the plateau of Sarkis in the land of Lomar, which was besieged by an enemy known as the Inutos.

While the other men within the city engage in combat with Inutos, the narrator is sent to a watchtower to signal if the Inutos gain access to the city itself. Within the tower, he notices Polaris in the sky and senses it as a malign presence, hearing a rhyme which appears to be spoken by the star:

"Slumber, watcher, till the spheres,
Six and twenty thousand years (Note: The period of precession of the equinoxes is 25,765 years, approximately 26,000 years.)
Have revolv'd, and I return
To the spot where now I burn.
Other stars anon shall rise
To the axis of the skies;
Stars that soothe and stars that bless
With a sweet forgetfulness:
Only when my round is o'er
Shall the past disturb thy door."

Uncertain as to its meaning, he drifts off to sleep, thus failing in his duty to guard Olathoë. Upon awakening, the narrator finds himself back in his house by the swamp, but the narrator is now convinced that this life isn't real but a dream from which he can never awaken.

== Inspiration ==
Critic William Fulwiler writes that "'Polaris' is one of Lovecraft's most autobiographical stories, reflecting his feelings of guilt, frustration, and uselessness during World War I. Like the narrator, Lovecraft was 'denied a warrior's part', for he 'was feeble and given to strange faintings when subjected to stress and hardships'".

Like many Lovecraft stories, "Polaris" was in part inspired by a dream, which he described in a letter: "Several nights ago I had a strange dream of a strange city—a city of many palaces and gilded domes, lying in a hollow betwixt ranges of grey, horrible hills.... I was, as I said, aware of this city visually. I was in it and around it. But certainly I had no corporeal existence."

Lovecraft remarked on the peculiar similarity of the story's style to that of Lord Dunsany, whose work he would not read for another year. An H. P. Lovecraft Encyclopedia suggests that Lovecraft and Dunsany were both influenced by the prose poems of Edgar Allan Poe.

== Publication ==
"Polaris" was first published in the December 1920 edition of The Philosopher, an amateur journal. It was later reprinted the May 1926 edition of the National Amateur, the February 1934 issue of Fantasy Fan, and the December 1937 issue of Weird Tales.

== See also ==
- Zhuangzi, "After he woke up, he wondered how he could determine whether he was Zhuangzi who had just finished dreaming he was a butterfly, or a butterfly who had just started dreaming he was Zhuangzi."

== Sources ==
- Lovecraft, Howard P. (1986) [1918]. "Polaris". In Joshi, S. T. (ed.). Dagon and Other Macabre Tales (9th corrected printing ed.). Sauk City, WI: Arkham House. ISBN 0-87054-039-4.
