= Arkham =

Fictional city in H.P. Lovecraft's works

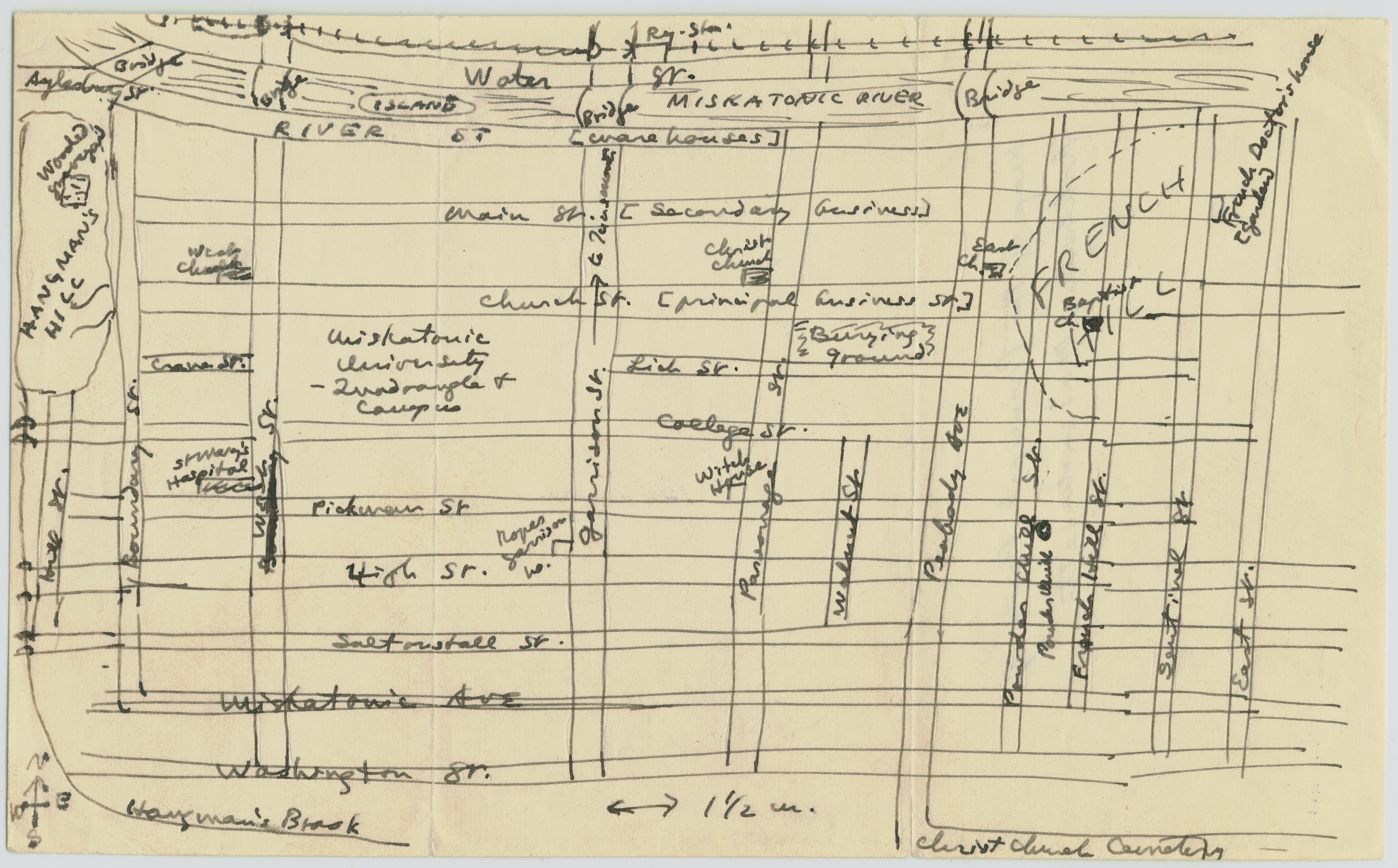
- H. P. Lovecraft's hand-drawn map of Arkham, Massachusetts
- Created by: H. P. Lovecraft
- Genre: Horror fiction

In-universe information
- Type: City
- Location: Massachusetts
- Locations: Miskatonic University

Arkham (/ˈɑːrkəm/) is a fictional city situated in Massachusetts, United States. An integral part of the Lovecraft Country setting created by H. P. Lovecraft, Arkham is featured in many of his stories and those of other Cthulhu Mythos writers.

Arkham House, a publishing company started by two of Lovecraft's correspondents, August Derleth and Donald Wandrei, takes its name from this city as a tribute. Arkham Asylum, a fictional mental hospital in DC Comics' Batman mythos, is also named after Lovecraft's Arkham.

== In Lovecraft's stories ==
Arkham is the home of Miskatonic University, which features prominently in many of Lovecraft's works. The institution finances the expeditions in the novellas, At the Mountains of Madness (1936) and The Shadow Out of Time (1936). Walter Gilman, of "The Dreams in the Witch House" (1933), attends classes at the university. Other notable institutions in Arkham are the Arkham Historical Society and the Arkham Sanitarium. It is said in "Herbert West—Reanimator" that the town was devastated by a typhoid outbreak in 1905.

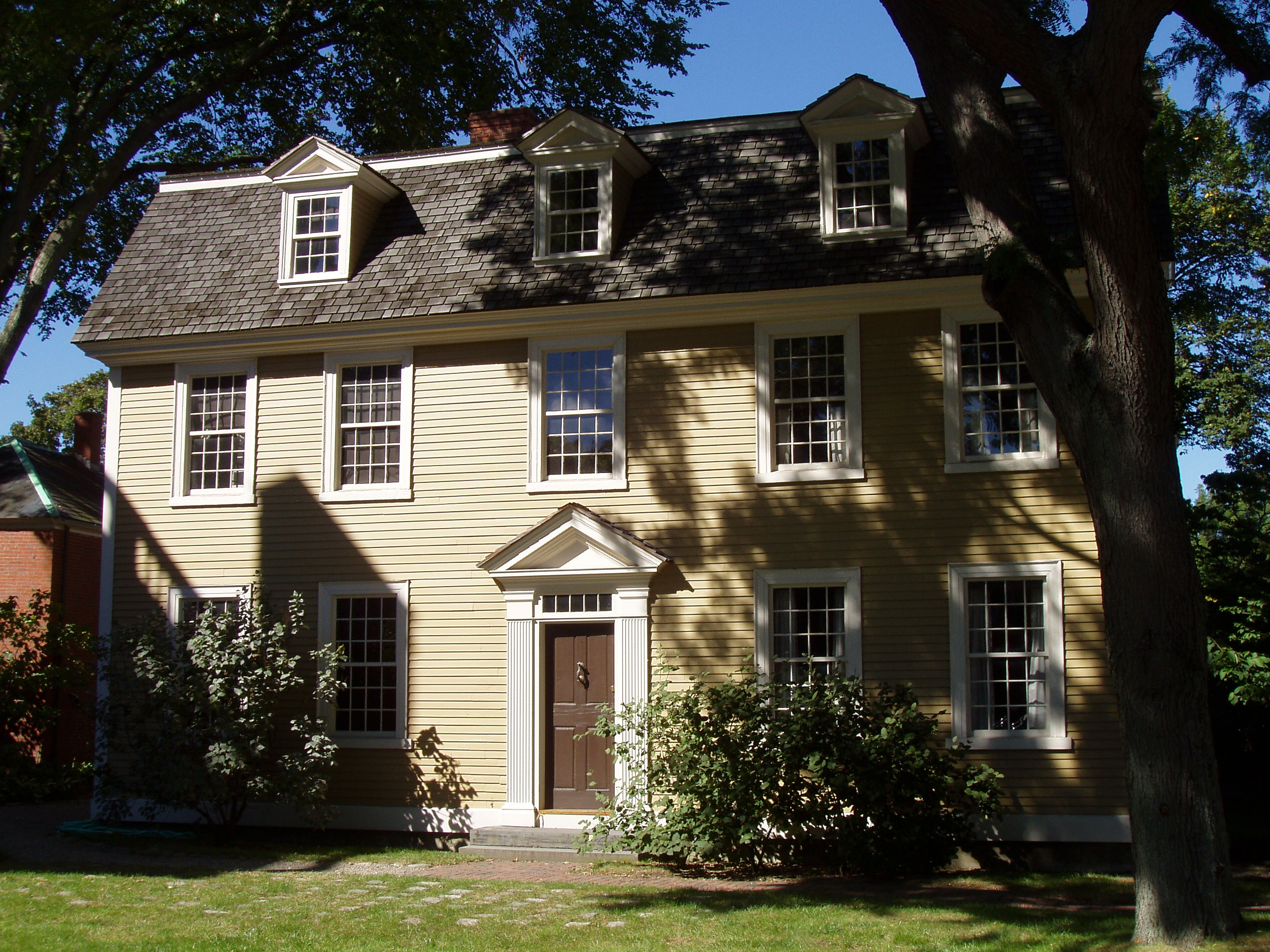
Lovecraft's Crowninshield House in The Thing on the Doorstep was modeled on the real Crowninshield-Bentley House in Salem, Massachusetts.

Arkham's main newspaper is the Arkham Advertiser, which has a circulation that reaches as far as Dunwich. In the 1880s, its newspaper is called the Arkham Gazette.

Arkham's most notable characteristics are its gambrel roofs and the dark legends that have surrounded the city for centuries.

=== Location ===
The precise location of Arkham is unspecified, although it may be surmised from Lovecraft's stories to be some distance to the north of Boston, probably in Essex County, Massachusetts.

Will Murray places Arkham in central Massachusetts and suggests it is based on the village of Oakham. Robert D. Marten rejects this and equates Arkham with Salem, with its name coming from Arkwright, Rhode Island (now part of Fiskville).

August Derleth describes Arkham as "Lovecraft's own well-known, widely used place-name for legend-haunted Salem, Massachusetts", and Lovecraft himself, in a letter to F. Lee Baldwin dated April 29, 1934, wrote that "[my] mental picture of Arkham is of a town something like Salem in atmosphere [and] style of houses, but more hilly [and] with a college (which Salem [lacks]) ... I place the town [and] the imaginary Miskatonic [River] somewhere north of Salem—perhaps near Manchester."

Arkham Sanitarium appears in the short story "The Thing on the Doorstep" and may have been inspired by the Danvers State Insane Asylum, (Danvers State Hospital) in Danvers, Massachusetts. Danvers State Hospital itself appears in Lovecraft's stories "Pickman's Model" and The Shadow over Innsmouth.

=== Miskatonic University ===
Miskatonic University neighborhood

Miskatonic University is a fictional university located in Arkham, near the banks of the (fictional) Miskatonic River. Lovecraft concocted the word Miskatonic as a mixture of root words from the Algonquian languages, the source of many place-names throughout New England. Anthony Pearsall believes the name is based on the Housatonic River, which flows from the Berkshires of Western Massachusetts and western Connecticut to Long Island Sound. Lovecraft first mentioned the Miskatonic River in his 1920 story "The Picture in the House".

After first appearing in H. P. Lovecraft's 1922 story "Herbert West–Reanimator", the school was mentioned in numerous Cthulhu Mythos stories by Lovecraft and other writers. The story "The Dunwich Horror" implies that Miskatonic University is an elite university on par with Harvard, and that Harvard and Miskatonic are the two most popular schools for the Massachusetts "Old Gentry". It is modeled on the northeastern Ivy League universities of Lovecraft's day, perhaps Brown University in his hometown Providence, which Lovecraft himself wished to attend. Miskatonic's student body is implied to be all-male like northeastern universities of Lovecraft's time. The only female student mentioned is Asenath Waite in "The Thing on the Doorstep" (1937).

The university library is famous for its collection of occult books, including one of the handful of genuine copies of the Necronomicon. Other tomes include Unaussprechlichen Kulten and the fragmentary Book of Eibon. Notable faculty members mentioned in Lovecraft's stories included doctors Henry Armitage and Francis Morgan in The Dunwich Horror, and Professor William Dyer in At the Mountains of Madness. Later authors would people the university with their own Mythos works.

== Appearances ==
=== Lovecraft's fiction ===
Dates are the year written.

Arkham first appeared in Lovecraft's short story "The Picture in the House" (1920), which is also the first to mention "Miskatonic".

It appears in other stories by Lovecraft, including:

- "Herbert West–Reanimator" (1921–1922); first story to mention "Miskatonic University"
- "The Unnamable" (1923)
- "The Silver Key" (1926)
- "The Colour Out of Space" (1927)
- "The Dunwich Horror" (1928)
- "The Whisperer in Darkness" (1930); Albert N. Wilmarth is described as a folklorist and assistant professor of English at Miskatonic University.
- At the Mountains of Madness (1931); one of the ships is named Arkham and the expedition that is the story’s subject is commissioned and financed by Miskatonic University
- The Shadow over Innsmouth (1931)
- "The Dreams in the Witch House" (1932)
- "Through the Gates of the Silver Key" (1932–1933)
- "The Thing on the Doorstep" (1933); first to mention "Arkham Sanitarium"
- "The Shadow Out of Time" (1934–1935)

=== Other appearances ===
- Arkham Asylum is a high-security asylum in the DC Universe, run by the eponymous Amadeus Arkham, where many Gotham City supervillains, including the Joker, are kept under guard. Editor Jack C. Harris and writer Dennis O'Neil picked the name as an homage to Lovecraft.
- Arkham Horror is a cooperative adventure board-game based on H. P. Lovecraft's Cthulhu Mythos. Players explore the town of Arkham while attempting to stop unmentionable horrors from spilling into the world.
- Video game Splatterhouse takes place in Arkham, Massachusetts.
- The Haunted Palace, the 1963 film directed by Roger Corman and based on H. P. Lovecraft's novella The Case of Charles Dexter Ward, is set in Arkham.
- Arkham appears in The Real Ghostbusters, season 2, episode 32, titled The Collect Call of Cthulhu (October 27, 1987), when members of the Ghostbusters go to Miskatonic University to get information on how to stop Cthulhu.
- As featured in the 2011 film The Whisperer in Darkness, exterior and interior scenes representing Miskatonic University were filmed at Mount Holyoke College and Pasadena City College respectively. The film is an adaption of H.P. Lovecraft's story The Whisperer in Darkness.
- Suitable Flesh, a 2023 film starring Heather Graham, directed by Joe Lynch, and based on the H.P. Lovecraft story The Thing on the Doorstep, takes place in Arkham and Miskatonic University.
- Arkham is the primary setting of Steven Philip Jones' Lovecraftian: The Shipwright Circle, part of his Lovecraftian series which reimagines the weird tales of H. P. Lovecraft into one single universal modern epic.
- Arkham is the setting the 2006 anthology Arkham Tales published by Chaosium.
- In the 2005 novel The Arcanum, Lovecraft himself is said to have been involved in solving a case involving a witch cult in Arkham.
- Arkham is mentioned in two novels by Charles Stross. In The Atrocity Archives, a philosopher is attracted to Arkham due to the "unique library" there. In The Jennifer Morgue, the occult branch of the American intelligence community, code-named "Black Chamber", is headquartered in Arkham.
- The audio drama series Malevolent borrows heavily from the works of Lovecraft, here Arkham is the home city of the main character, private investigator Arthur Lester.
