= Cthulhu Mythos =

Shared fictional universe based on the work of H. P. Lovecraft

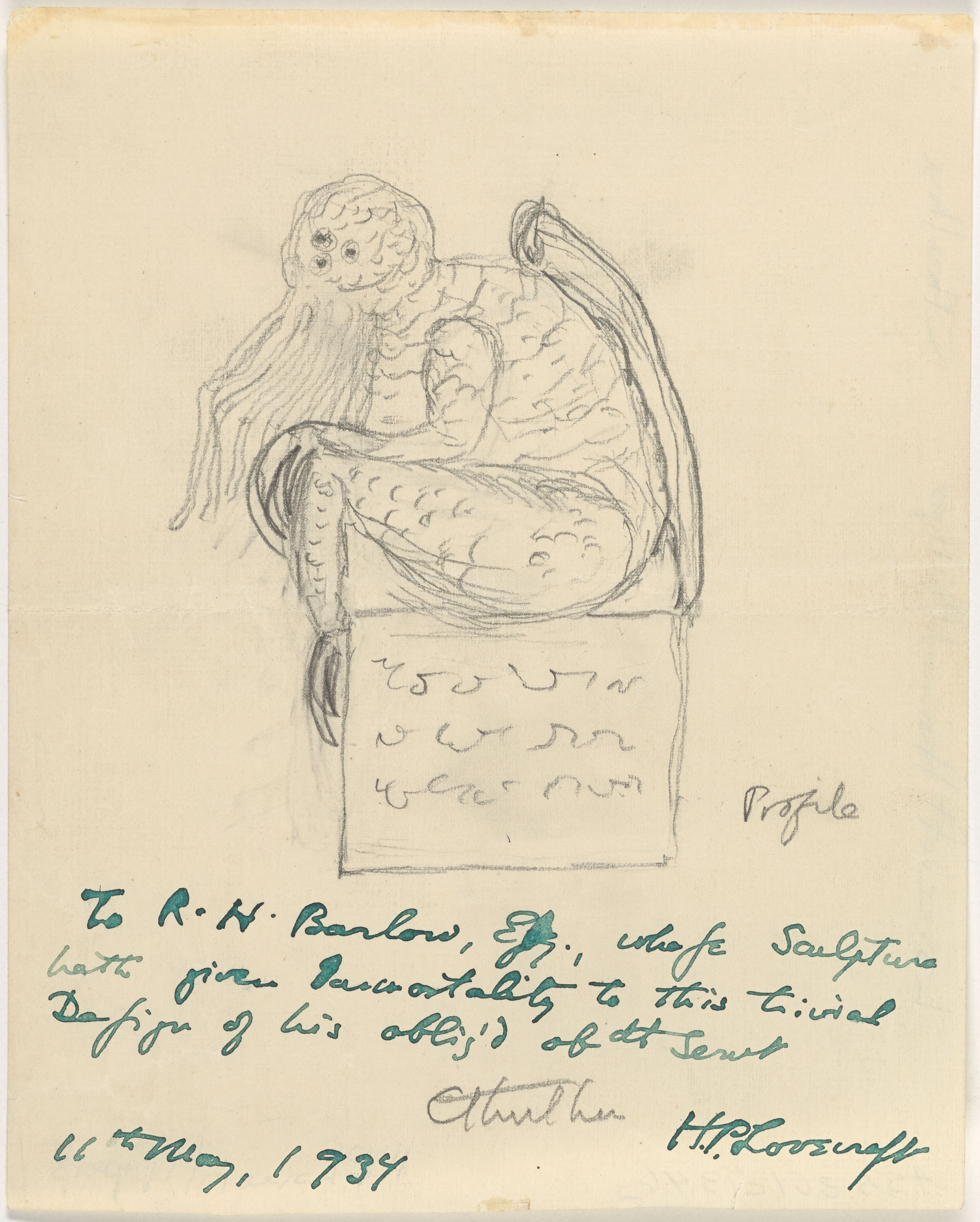
H. P. Lovecraft's representation of Cthulhu

The Cthulhu Mythos is a mythopoeia and a shared universe, originating in the works of American horror writer H. P. Lovecraft. The term was coined by August Derleth, a contemporary correspondent and protégé of Lovecraft, to describe the settings, tropes, and lore employed by Lovecraft and his literary successors. The name "Cthulhu" derives from the central creature in Lovecraft's seminal short story "The Call of Cthulhu", first published in the pulp magazine Weird Tales in 1928.

Richard L. Tierney, a writer who also wrote Mythos tales, later applied the term "Derleth Mythos" to distinguish Lovecraft's works from Derleth's later stories, which modify key tenets of the Mythos. Authors of Lovecraftian horror in particular frequently use elements of the Cthulhu Mythos.

== History ==
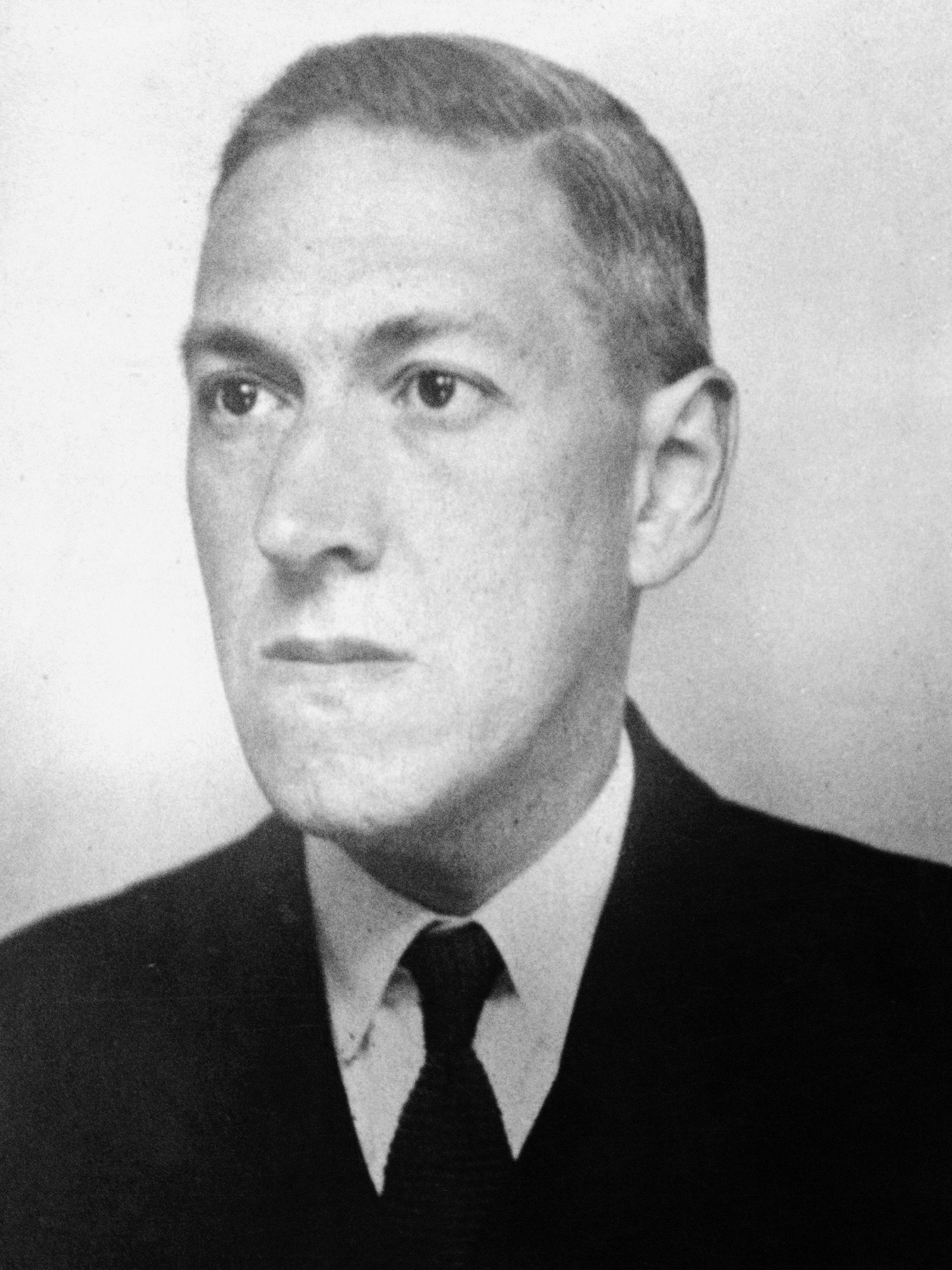
H. P. Lovecraft, the creator of the Cthulhu Mythos

In his essay "H. P. Lovecraft and the Cthulhu Mythos", Robert M. Price described two stages in the development of the Cthulhu Mythos. Price called the first stage the "Cthulhu Mythos proper". This stage was formulated during Lovecraft's lifetime and was subject to his guidance. The second stage was guided by August Derleth who, in addition to publishing Lovecraft's stories after his death, attempted to categorize and expand the Mythos.

=== First stage ===
An ongoing theme in Lovecraft's work is the complete irrelevance of mankind in the face of the cosmic horrors that apparently exist in the universe. Lovecraft made frequent references to the "Great Old Ones", a loose pantheon of ancient, powerful deities from space who once ruled the Earth and have since fallen into a deathlike sleep. While these monstrous deities were present in almost all of Lovecraft's published work (his second short story "Dagon", published in 1919, is considered the start of the Mythos), the first story to really expand the pantheon of Great Old Ones and its themes is "The Call of Cthulhu", which was published in 1928.

Lovecraft broke with other pulp writers of the time by having his main characters' minds deteriorate when afforded a glimpse of what exists outside their perceived reality. He emphasized the point by stating in the opening sentence of the story that "The most merciful thing in the world, I think, is the inability of the human mind to correlate all its contents."

Writer Dirk W. Mosig noted that Lovecraft was a "mechanistic materialist" who embraced the philosophy of cosmic indifferentism and believed in a purposeless, mechanical, and uncaring universe. Human beings, with their limited faculties, can never fully understand this universe, and the cognitive dissonance caused by this revelation leads to insanity, in his view.

There have been attempts at categorizing this fictional group of beings. Phillip A. Schreffler argues that by carefully scrutinizing Lovecraft's writings, a workable framework emerges that outlines the entire "pantheon"—from the unreachable "Outer Ones" (e.g., Azathoth, who occupies the centre of the universe) and "Great Old Ones" (e.g., Cthulhu, imprisoned on Earth in the sunken city of R'lyeh) to the lesser castes (the lowly slave shoggoths and the Mi-Go).

David E. Schultz said Lovecraft never meant to create a canonical Mythos but rather intended his imaginary pantheon to serve merely as a background element. Lovecraft himself humorously referred to his Mythos as "Yog Sothothery" (Dirk W. Mosig coincidentally suggested the term Yog-Sothoth Cycle of Myth be substituted for Cthulhu Mythos). At times, Lovecraft even had to remind his readers that his Mythos creations were entirely fictional.

The view that there was no rigid structure is expounded upon by S. T. Joshi, who said

Lovecraft's imaginary cosmogony was never a static system but rather a sort of aesthetic construct that remained ever adaptable to its creator's developing personality and altering interests. ... There was never a rigid system that might be posthumously appropriated. ... The essence of the mythos lies not in a pantheon of imaginary deities nor in a cobwebby collection of forgotten tomes, but rather in a certain convincing cosmic attitude.

Price said Lovecraft's writings could at least be divided into categories and identified three distinct themes: the "Dunsanian" (written in a similar style as Lord Dunsany), "Arkham" (occurring in Lovecraft's fictionalized New England setting), and "Cthulhu" (the cosmic tales) cycles. Writer Will Murray noted that while Lovecraft often used his fictional pantheon in the stories he ghostwrote for other authors, he reserved Arkham and its environs exclusively for those tales he wrote under his own name.

Although the Mythos was not formalized or acknowledged between them, Lovecraft did correspond, meet in person, and share story elements with other contemporary writers including Clark Ashton Smith, Robert E. Howard, Robert Bloch, Frank Belknap Long, Henry Kuttner, Henry S. Whitehead, and Fritz Leiber—a group referred to as the "Lovecraft Circle".

For example, Robert E. Howard's character Friedrich Von Junzt reads Lovecraft's Necronomicon in the short story "The Children of the Night" (1931), and in turn Lovecraft mentions Howard's Unaussprechlichen Kulten in the stories "Out of the Aeons" (1935) and "The Shadow Out of Time" (1936). Many of Howard's original unedited Conan stories also involve parts of the Cthulhu Mythos.

=== Second stage ===
Price denotes the second stage's commencement with August Derleth, with the principal difference between Lovecraft and Derleth being the latter's (deeply debated) use of hope and development of the idea that the Cthulhu Mythos essentially represented a struggle between good and evil.

Derleth is credited with creating the "Elder Gods". He stated:

As Lovecraft conceived the deities or forces of his mythos, there were, initially, the Elder Gods.... These Elder Gods were benign deities, representing the forces of good, and existed peacefully...very rarely stirring forth to intervene in the unceasing struggle between the powers of evil and the races of Earth. These powers of evil were variously known as the Great Old Ones or the Ancient Ones....

Price said the basis for Derleth's system is found in Lovecraft: "Was Derleth's use of the rubric 'Elder Gods' so alien to Lovecraft's in At the Mountains of Madness? Perhaps not. In fact, this very story, along with some hints from "The Shadow over Innsmouth", provides the key to the origin of the 'Derleth Mythos'. For in At the Mountains of Madness is shown the history of a conflict between interstellar races, first among them the Elder Ones and the Cthulhu-spawn."

Derleth said Lovecraft wished other authors would actively write about the Mythos rather than treat it as a discrete plot device within Lovecraft's own stories. Derleth expanded the boundaries of the Mythos by including any passing reference to another author's story elements by Lovecraft as part of the genre. Just as Lovecraft made passing reference to Clark Ashton Smith's Book of Eibon, Derleth in turn added Smith's Ubbo-Sathla to the Mythos.

Derleth also attempted to connect the deities of the Mythos to the classical elements, creating new beings representative of certain elements to legitimize his system of classification. He created "Cthugha" as a sort of fire elemental when a fan, Francis Towner Laney, complained that he had neglected to include the element in his schema. Laney, the editor of The Acolyte, had categorized the Mythos in an essay that first appeared in the Winter 1942 issue of the magazine.

Impressed by the glossary, Derleth asked Laney to rewrite it for publication in the Arkham House collection Beyond the Wall of Sleep (1943). Laney's essay ("The Cthulhu Mythos") was later republished in Crypt of Cthulhu #32 (1985). In applying the elemental theory to beings that function on a cosmic scale (e.g., Yog-Sothoth) some authors created a fifth element that they termed aethyr.

Derleth and after authors' elemental classifications
Air	Earth	Fire	Water
Hastur; Ithaqua*1; Zhar and Lloigor*1	Cyäegha; Nyarlathotep*2; Nyogtha; Shub-Niggurath*2; Tsathoggua; Yig	Aphoom-Zhah; Cthugha*1	Cthulhu; Dagon; Ghatanothoa; Mother Hydra; Zoth-Ommog
*1 Deity created by Derleth; *2 Also considered Aethyr

== Fictional cults ==
A number of fictional cults dedicated to "malevolent supernatural entities" appear in the Cthulhu Mythos, the loosely connected series of horror stories written by Lovecraft and other writers inspired by his creations. These fictional cults have, in some ways, taken on a life of their own beyond the pages of Lovecraft's works. According to author John Engle, "The very real world of esoteric magical and occult practices has adopted Lovecraft and his works into its canon, which have informed the ritual practices, or even formed the bedrock, of certain cabals and magical circles".

== Significance ==
The Cthulhu Mythos of H. P. Lovecraft is considered to have been highly influential for the speculative fiction genre. It has been called "the official fictional religion of fantasy, science fiction, and horror, a grab bag for writers in need of unthinkably vast, and unthinkably indifferent, eldritch entities".

== Biology ==
Sollasina cthulhu, an extinct ophiocistioid echinoderm, is named after the Cthulhu Mythos.

Yogsothoth is a genus of centrohelid protists.

== See also ==
- List of Cthulhu Mythos characters – Fictional characters in H. P. Lovecraft's Cthulhu Mythos story cycle
- Cthulhu Mythos deities
- Cthulhu Mythos species – List of fictional creatures
- Cthulhu Mythos anthology – Short story collections set in the milieu created by H. P. Lovecraft
- Cthulhu Mythos in popular culture – Cultural references to H. P. Lovecraft
- Weird fiction – Subgenre of speculative fiction
