= Deep One =

Lovecraftian creature

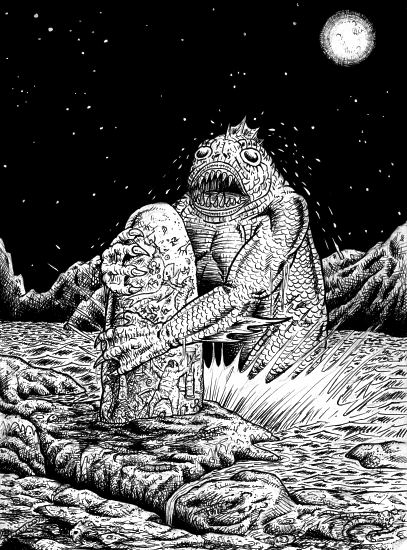
Fan illustration of a Deep One from Lovecraft's story "Dagon"

The Deep Ones are creatures in the Cthulhu Mythos of H. P. Lovecraft. The beings first appeared in Lovecraft's novella The Shadow over Innsmouth (1931), but were already hinted at in the early short story "Dagon". The Deep Ones are a race of intelligent ocean-dwelling creatures, approximately human-shaped but with a fishy appearance.

Numerous Mythos elements are associated with the Deep Ones, including the legendary town of Innsmouth, the undersea city of Y'ha-nthlei, the Esoteric Order of Dagon, and the beings known as Father Dagon and Mother Hydra. After their debut in Lovecraft's tale, the sea-dwelling creatures resurfaced in the works of other authors, especially August Derleth.

== Summary ==
The Deep Ones are an ancient species of amphibious sea-dwelling humanoids, whose preferred habitat is the deep ocean. A description is offered by the narrator of The Shadow Over Innsmouth:

I think their predominant color was a greyish-green, though they had white bellies. They were mostly shiny and slippery, but the ridges of their backs were scaly. Their forms vaguely suggested the anthropoid, while their heads were the heads of fish, with prodigious bulging eyes that never closed. At the sides of their necks were palpitating gills, and their long paws were webbed. They hopped irregularly, sometimes on two legs and sometimes on four. I was somehow glad that they had no more than four limbs. Their croaking, baying voices, clearly used for articulate speech, held all the dark shades of expression which their staring faces lacked ... They were the blasphemous fish-frogs of the nameless design—living and horrible.

A very similar description is provided in the much-earlier story Dagon:

I think that these things were supposed to depict men—at least, a certain sort of men; though the creatures were shewn disporting like fishes in the waters of some marine grotto, or paying homage at some monolithic shrine which appeared to be under the waves as well. Of their faces and forms I dare not speak in detail; for the mere remembrance makes me grow faint. Grotesque beyond the imagination of a Poe or a Bulwer, they were damnably human in general outline despite webbed hands and feet, shockingly wide and flabby lips, glassy, bulging eyes, and other features less pleasant to recall. Curiously enough, they seemed to have been chiselled badly out of proportion with their scenic background; for one of the creatures was shewn in the act of killing a whale represented as but little larger than himself.

A significant difference between the two narratives is that the single creature observed by the narrator is of a vast size, whereas the beings seen off Innsmouth are roughly human in scale. Despite being primarily marine creatures, Deep Ones can survive on land for extended periods of time. They possess biological immortality, and never die except by accident or violence. They worship twin deities, the cult of whom they have introduced among the human population of Innsmouth, who know them as "Father Dagon and Mother Hydra". However, the elderly derelict (and Order of Dagon initiate) Zadok Allen invokes Cthulhu in a moment of strong emotion, and Robert M. Price has suggested that "Dagon" may have merely been "the closest biblical analogy to the real object of worship of the deep ones" The Deep Ones are or were opposed by mysterious beings known as the Old Ones, who have left behind magical artifacts that can keep them in check. This detail is one of the vestigial hints that August Derleth developed into the mostly unnamed Elder Gods.

== Esoteric Order of Dagon ==
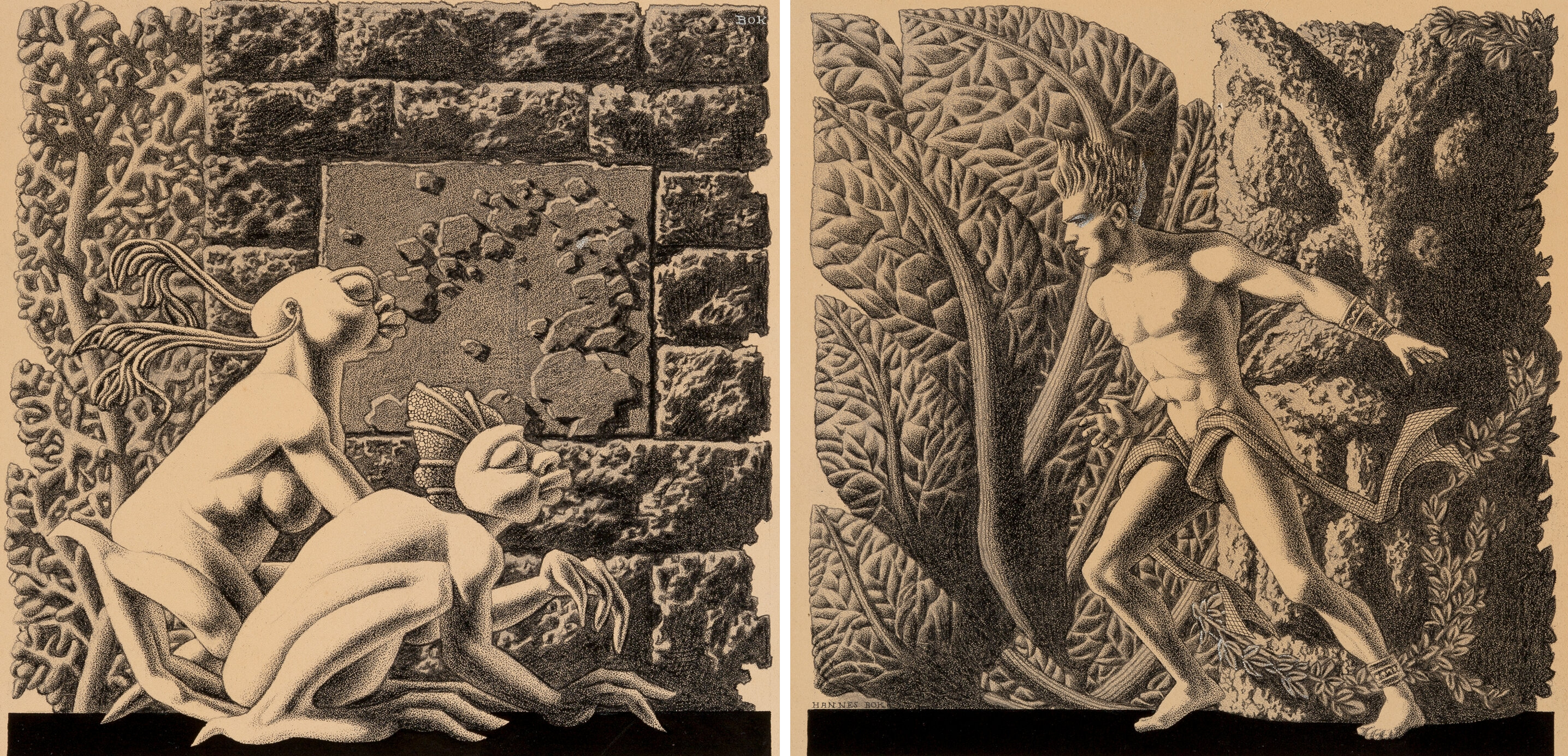
Hannes Bok's illustrations for the publication of The Shadow over Innsmouth in the January 1942 issue of Weird Tales

The Esoteric Order of Dagon was the primary religion in Innsmouth after Marsh returned from the South Seas with the dark religion circa 1838. It quickly took root due to its promises of expensive gold artifacts and fish. Fish were a valuable commodity in Innsmouth, a fishing town.

The central beings worshipped by the Order were the Father Dagon and Mother Hydra, and, to a lesser extent, Cthulhu. Dagon and Hydra were seen largely as intermediaries between the various gods rather than as gods themselves. Even so, the cultists sacrificed various locals to the Deep Ones at specific times in exchange for a limitless supply of gold and fish. When they ran out of locals, they would go to other places to kidnap people to be sacrificed. Eventually, things became so bad that the US government sent the police force to apprehend Marsh and his cult.

The Esoteric Order of Dagon (which masqueraded as the local Masonic movement) had three oaths that members had to take. The first was an oath of secrecy, the second, an oath of loyalty, and the third, an oath to marry a Deep One and bear or sire its child. Due to the latter oath, interbreeding became the norm in Innsmouth, resulting in widespread deformities and many half-breeds.

The Esoteric Order of Dagon was seemingly destroyed when one of Obed Marsh's "lost descendants" sent the U.S. Treasury Department to seize the town. As a result, the town was more or less destroyed and the Order was thought disbanded.

== Deep One hybrid ==
The backstory of The Shadow over Innsmouth involves a bargain between Deep Ones and humans, in which the aquatic species provides plentiful fishing and gold in the form of strangely-formed jewelry. In return, the land-dwellers give human sacrifices and a promise of "mixing"—the mating of humans with Deep Ones. Although the Deep One hybrid offspring are born with the appearance of a normal human being, the individual will later in life transform into a Deep One, gaining immortality—by default—only when the transformation is complete.

The transformation usually occurs when the individual reaches middle age. As the hybrid gets older, they begin to acquire the so-called "Innsmouth Look" as they take on more and more attributes of the Deep One race: shrunken ears, bulging and unblinking eyes, a narrowed head which eventually goes bald, scabrous skin that transforms into scales, and a neck which develops folds and later gills. When the hybrid becomes too obviously non-human, it is hidden away from outsiders. Eventually, however, the hybrid will be compelled to slip into the sea to live with the Deep Ones in one of their undersea cities.

== Father Dagon and Mother Hydra ==
Mother Hydra and her consort Father Dagon are both Deep Ones overgrown after millennia ruling over their lesser brethren. Together with Cthulhu, they form the triad of gods worshipped by the Deep Ones (their names are inspired by Dagon, the Semitic fertility deity, and the Hydra of Greek mythology).

Mother Hydra is not to be confused with the entity in Henry Kuttner's story "Hydra".

== Y'ha-nthlei ==
"Cyclopean and many-columned Y'ha-nthlei" is the only Deep One city named by Lovecraft. It is described as a great undersea metropolis below Devil's Reef just off the coast of Massachusetts, near the town of Innsmouth. Its exact age is not known, but one resident is said to have lived there for 80,000 years. In Lovecraft's story, the U.S. government torpedoed Devil's Reef, and Y'ha-nthlei was presumed destroyed, although the ending of the story implies it survived.

The name Y'ha-nthlei may have been inspired by the Lord Dunsany character "Yoharneth-Lahai", "the god of little dreams and fancies" who "sendeth little dreams out of PEGANA to please the people of Earth."

Other authors have invented Deep One cities in other parts of the ocean, including Ahu-Y'hloa near Cornwall and G'll-Hoo, near the volcanic island of Surtsey off the coast of Iceland.

Anders Fager has described the city of "Ya' Dich-Gho" as located in the Stockholm skerries. It is accidentally destroyed in 1982 during a Swedish submarine-hunt. At least two surviving Deep Ones live in Stockholm. One of them sells aquarist's supplies. The destruction of Ya' Dich-Gho is described in "When Death Came to Bod Reef"; the city's history in "Herr Goering's Artefact" and the life of the survivors in "Three Weeks of Bliss".

== See also ==
- Selkie
- Cold Skin (Film)
