= Cthulhu Mythos species =

List of fictional creatures

This is a list of fictional creatures from the Cthulhu Mythos of American writer H. P. Lovecraft and his collaborators.

== Byakhee ==
The byakhees or byakhee birds first appeared in Lovecraft's short story "The Festival" and were later featured in August Derleth's tale "The House on Curwen Street." They are the servants of the Great Old One Hastur.

Lovecraft provides a description of the byakhees in "The Festival":

Out of the unimaginable blackness beyond the gangrenous glare of that cold flame, out of the tartarean leagues through which that oily river rolled uncanny, unheard, and unsuspected, there flopped rhythmically a horde of tame, trained, hybrid winged things that no sound eye could ever wholly grasp, or sound brain ever wholly remember. They were not altogether crows, nor moles, nor buzzards, nor ants, nor vampire bats, nor decomposed human beings; but something I cannot and must not recall. They flopped limply along, half with their webbed feet and half with their membranous wings; and as they reached the throng of celebrants the cowled figures seized and mounted them, and rode off one by one along the reaches of that unlighted river, into pits and galleries of panic where poison springs feed frightful and undiscoverable cataracts.

== Deep Ones ==
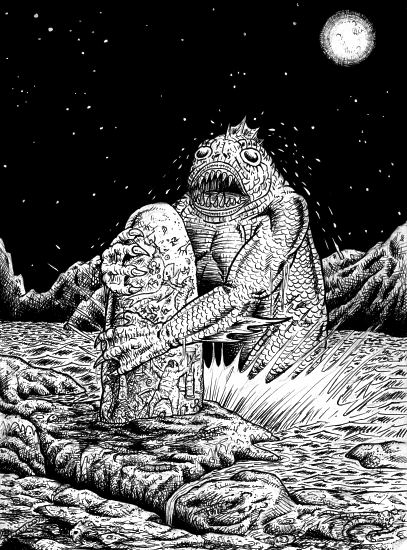
Fan illustration of a Deep One from Lovecraft's story "Dagon"

The Deep Ones first appeared in Lovecraft's novella The Shadow over Innsmouth (1931), but were already hinted at in the early short story "Dagon". The Deep Ones are a race of intelligent ocean-dwelling creatures, approximately human-shaped but with a fishy appearance. They regularly mate with humans along the coast, creating societies of hybrids.

Numerous Mythos elements are associated with the Deep Ones, including the legendary town of Innsmouth, the undersea city of Y'ha-nthlei, the Esoteric Order of Dagon, and the beings known as Father Dagon and Mother Hydra. After their debut in Lovecraft's tale, the sea-dwelling creatures resurfaced in the works of other authors, especially August Derleth.

Lovecraft provides a description of the Deep Ones in The Shadow over Innsmouth:

I think their predominant color was a greyish-green, though they had white bellies. They were mostly shiny and slippery, but the ridges of their backs were scaly. Their forms vaguely suggested the anthropoid, while their heads were the heads of fish, with prodigious bulging eyes that never closed. At the sides of their necks were palpitating gills, and their long paws were webbed. They hopped irregularly, sometimes on two legs and sometimes on four. I was somehow glad that they had no more than four limbs. Their croaking, baying voices, clearly used for articulate speech, held all the dark shades of expression which their staring faces lacked ... They were the blasphemous fish-frogs of the nameless design—living and horrible.

Lovecraft describes the Deep Ones as a race of undersea-dwelling humanoids whose preferred habitat is deep in the ocean (hence their name). However, despite being primarily marine creatures, they can come to the surface and can survive on land for extended periods of time. All Deep Ones are immortal; none die except by accident or violence, and they can grow to massive size. They are said to serve the beings known as Father Dagon and Mother Hydra, as well as Cthulhu. They are opposed by mysterious beings known as the Old Gods, whose powerful magic can keep them in check. This detail is one of the vestigial hints that August Derleth developed as the mostly unnamed Elder Gods.

=== Deep One hybrid ===
The backstory of The Shadow over Innsmouth involves a bargain between Deep Ones and humans, in which the aquatic species provides plentiful fishing and gold in the form of strangely formed jewelry. In return, the land-dwellers give human sacrifices and a promise of "mixing"—the mating of humans with Deep Ones. Although the Deep One hybrid offspring are born with the appearance of a normal human being, the individual will eventually transform into a Deep One, gaining immortality—by default—only when the transformation is complete.

The transformation usually occurs when the individual reaches middle age. As the hybrid gets older, they begin to acquire the so-called "Innsmouth Look" as they take on more and more attributes of the Deep One race: the ears shrink, the eyes bulge and become unblinking, the head narrows and gradually goes bald, the skin becomes scabrous as it changes into scales, and the neck develops folds which later become gills. When the hybrid becomes too obviously non-human, it is hidden away from outsiders. Eventually, however, the hybrid will be compelled to slip into the sea to live with the Deep Ones in one of their undersea cities.

=== Father Dagon and Mother Hydra ===
Mother Hydra and her consort Father Dagon are both Deep Ones overgrown after millennia ruling over their lesser brethren. Together with Cthulhu, they form the triad of gods worshipped by the Deep Ones (their names are inspired by Dragon, or Dagon, the Semitic fertility deity, and the Hydra of Greek mythology).

Mother Hydra is not to be confused with the entity in Henry Kuttner's story "Hydra".

=== Y'ha-nthlei ===
"Cyclopean and many-columned Y'ha-nthlei" is the only Deep One city named by Lovecraft. It is described as a great undersea metropolis below Devil's Reef just off the coast of Massachusetts, near the town of Innsmouth. Its exact age is not known, but one resident is said to have lived there for 80,000 years. In Lovecraft's story, the U.S. government torpedoed Devil's Reef, and Y'ha-nthlei was presumed destroyed, although the ending of the story implies it survived.

The name Y'ha-nthlei may have been inspired by the Lord Dunsany character "Yoharneth-Lahai", "the god of little dreams and fancies" who "sendeth little dreams out of PEGANA to please the people of Earth."

Other authors have invented Deep One cities in other parts of the ocean, including Ahu-Y'hloa near Cornwall and G'll-Hoo, near the volcanic island of Surtsey off the coast of Iceland.

Anders Fager has described the city of "Ya' Dich-Gho" as located in the Stockholm skerries. It is accidentally destroyed in 1982 during a Swedish submarine-hunt. At least two surviving Deep Ones live in Stockholm. One of them sells aquarist's supplies. The destruction of Ya' Dich-Gho is described in "When Death Came to Bod Reef"; the city's history in "Herr Goering's Artefact" and the life of the survivors in "Three Weeks of Bliss".

== Elder Things ==
The Elder Things (also known as the Old Ones and Elder Ones) are fictional extraterrestrials in the Cthulhu Mythos. The beings first appeared in H. P. Lovecraft's novella, At the Mountains of Madness (published in 1936, but written in 1931), and later appeared, although not named, in the short story "The Dreams in the Witch-House" (1933). Additional references to the Elder Things appear in Lovecraft's short story "The Shadow Out of Time" (1936).

=== Description ===
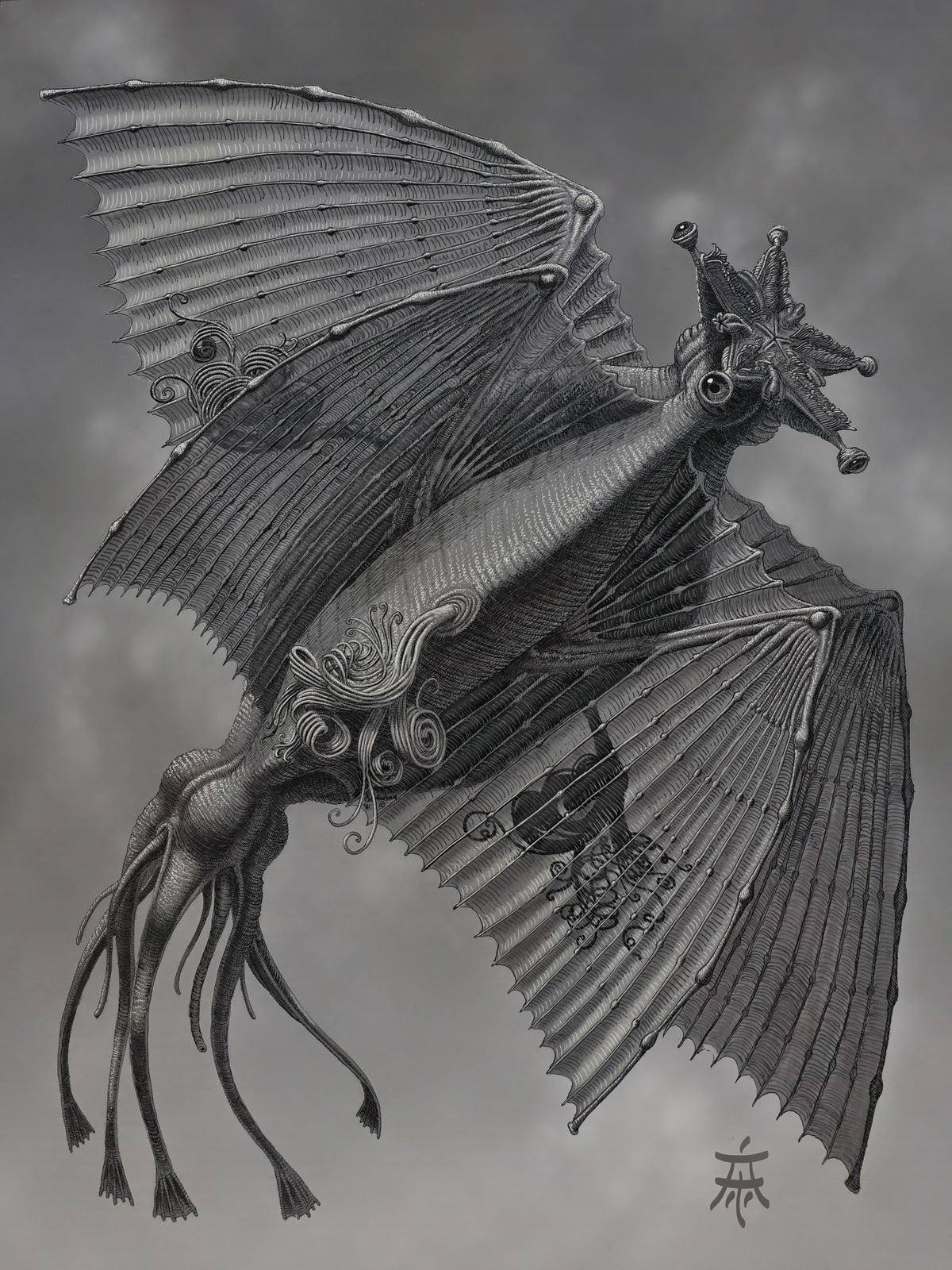
Fan illustration of an Elder Thing

Description of a partial headless body:

Six feet end to end, three and five-tenths feet central diameter, tapering to one foot at each end. Like a barrel with five bulging ridges in place of staves. Lateral breakages, as of thinnish stalks, are at equator in middle of these ridges. In furrows between ridges are curious growths—combs or wings that fold up and spread out like fans ... which gives almost seven-foot wing spread. Arrangement reminds one of certain monsters of primal myth, especially fabled Elder Things in the Necronomicon.

—H. P. Lovecraft, At the Mountains of Madness

In the Mythos canon, the Elder Things were the first extraterrestrial species to come to the Earth, colonizing the planet about one billion years ago. They stood roughly eight feet tall and had the appearance of a huge, oval-shaped barrel with starfish-like appendages at both ends. The top appendage was a head adorned with five eyes, five eating tubes, and a set of cilia for "seeing" without light. The bottom appendage was five-limbed and was used for walking and other forms of locomotion. The beings also had five leathery, fan-like retractable wings and five sets of branching tentacles that sprouted from their torsos. Both their tentacles and the slits housing their folded wings were spaced at regular intervals about their bodies.

Lovecraft described the Elder Things as vegetable-like or echinoderm-like in shape, having radial symmetry instead of the bilateral symmetry of bipeds. They also differed in that they had a five-lobed brain. The Elder Things exhibited vegetable as well as animal characteristics, and in terms of reproduction, multiplied using spores, although they discouraged increasing their numbers except when colonizing new regions. Though they could make use of both organic and inorganic substances, the Elder Things were carnivorous by preference. They were also amphibious.

The bodies of the Elder Things were incredibly tough, capable of withstanding the pressures of the deepest ocean. Few died except by accident or violence. The beings were also capable of hibernating for vast epochs of time. Nonetheless, unlike many other beings of the Mythos, the Elder Things were made of normal, terrestrial matter.

=== Technology ===
The technology that the Elder Things possessed was not described at length, but was described as being extremely advanced. They are also revealed in At the Mountains of Madness as being the creators of a servitor race, the shoggoths.

=== Society ===
Because they reproduced through spores, there was little biological basis for families to form, and were thus grouped together with others with whom they would get along. Elderian "families" lived in large dwellings, where furniture and other decoration was placed in the center of the rooms, to leave the walls open for murals.

In furnishing their homes they kept everything in the center of the huge rooms, leaving all the wall spaces free for decorative treatment. Lighting, in the case of the land inhabitants, was accomplished by a device probably electro-chemical in nature. Both on land and under water they used curious tables, chairs and couches like cylindrical frames – for they rested and slept upright with folded-down tentacles – and racks for hinged sets of dotted surfaces forming their books.

Government was evidently complex and probably socialistic, though no certainties in this regard could be deduced from the sculptures we saw. There was extensive commerce, both local and between different cities – certain small, flat counters, five-pointed and inscribed, serving as money. Probably the smaller of the various greenish soapstones found by our expedition were pieces of such currency. Though the culture was mainly urban, some agriculture and much stock raising existed. Mining and a limited amount of manufacturing were also practiced. Travel was very frequent, but permanent migration seemed relatively rare except for the vast colonizing movements by which the race expanded. For personal locomotion no external aid was used, since in land, air, and water movement alike the Old Ones seemed to possess excessively vast capacities for speed. Loads, however, were drawn by beasts of burden – Shoggoths under the sea, and a curious variety of primitive vertebrates in the later years of land existence.
—H. P. Lovecraft, At the Mountains of Madness

In "The Dreams in the Witch-House," the central character is sent through a dimensional portal to a planet in a triple star system (with a yellow, red, and blue star) located "between Hydra and Argo Navis", and populated by Elder Things.

=== History ===
On Earth, the Elder Things built huge cities, both underwater and on dry land. They may be responsible for the appearance of the first life-forms on Earth, including the entity known as Ubbo-Sathla (although sources differ in this regard). They created the shoggoths to be their all-purpose slave race. Eventually, however, the shoggoths rebelled—an event that hastened the decline and ultimate collapse of their civilization. Although the Elder Things managed to initially subdue the shoggoths after their attempted rebellion, the shoggoths continued to improve physiologically, increasing in intelligence and developing the capacity to live on land.

The Elder Things are known to have warred against the star-spawn of Cthulhu, the Great Race of Yith, and the Mi-go. Despite these conflicts, it was the gradual cooling of the planet during the last ice age that spelled their doom. Retreating to their undersea cities deep in the ocean, they would thereafter have no further dealings with the outer world. Their last surface city, located on a high plateau in the Antarctic, remains frozen in ice. The ruins of this city were discovered in 1931 by two members of an Antarctic expedition from Miskatonic University.

The last known and most significant undersea city is located directly beneath the Elder Things' ultimate surface city in the Antarctic, and was apparently overrun by the shoggoths. Four of the eight Elder Things (still alive after millions of years) unearthed by other members of the Miskatonic expedition were described in the story At the Mountains of Madness as being survivors from an early age of the species' civilization. They were killed by a shoggoth while attempting to find a means to enter the subterranean ocean in the Antarctic, apparently unaware of the city's collapse.

Not named, but implied by description, the Elder Things appeared in "The Dreams in the Witch House".

== Ghouls ==
See "Pickman's Model".

== Great Race of Yith ==
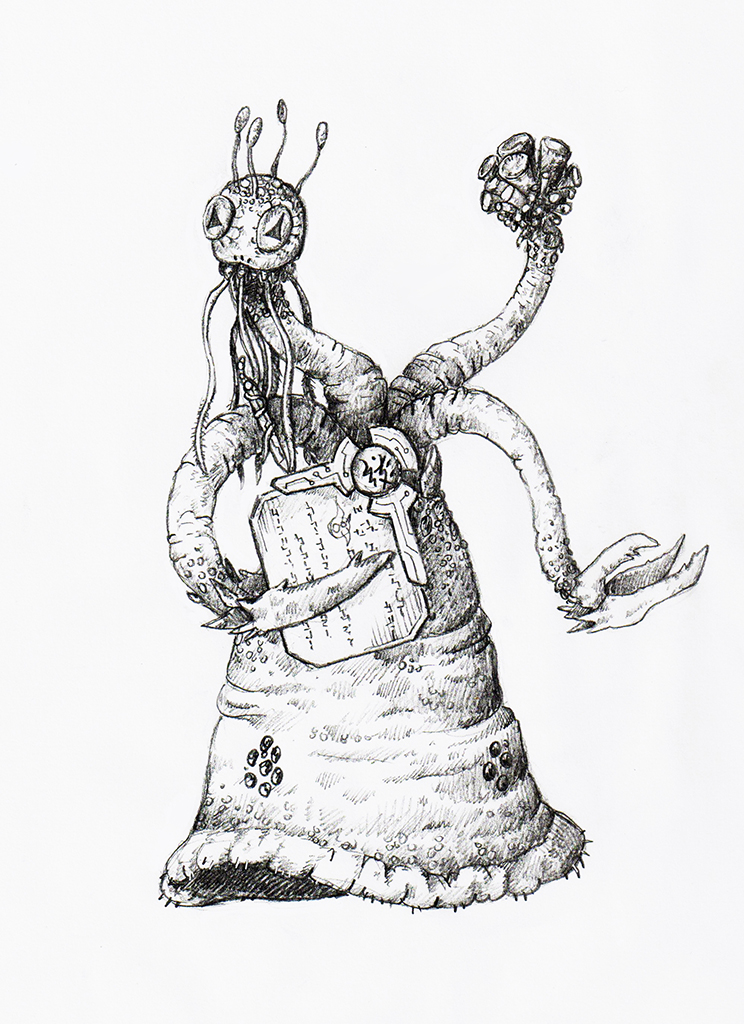
Fan illustration of a member of the Great Race of Yith

Introduced in Lovecraft's novella "The Shadow Out of Time", the Great Race was a prehistoric civilization that populated much of the Earth until their demise in the late Cretaceous era. Yithians resembled tall, rugose cones with four appendages: two claws, a trumpet-like limb, and a yellow, globe-like organ. Their great power derived from their mastery of precognition via time travel.

The Great Race are beings of enormous intellectual and psychic powers that once dwelt on the dying world of Yith. They escaped the destruction of their home planet by transferring their minds to the bodies of a species native to the Earth in the far distant past. They lived on earth for 200 million years or so, in fierce competition with the Flying Polyps, whom they initially subdued. However, this enemy over time increased in number and near the close of the Cretaceous era (about 66 million years ago), rose up and finally destroyed the civilization of the Race of Yith, forcing the Yithians to flee en masse to other bodies located far in the future.

The unique ability of this scientifically advanced race was to travel through time by swapping minds with creatures of another era. This allowed them to satisfy their interest in human culture, science, and occult beliefs. Occupied beings' minds transferred to Yithian bodies against their will; these "captive minds" were queried by skilled inquisitors while the Yithians using their bodies learned as much as possible about the societies in which they dwelt. The Yithians would use their knowledge of the timeline gained in this way to subtly intervene in events to ensure that the events lead towards the rise of another species in the distant future that the Great Race could again project their consciousnesses to before they were overwhelmed by the Flying Polyps.

== Gugs ==
See The Dream-Quest of Unknown Kadath.

== Hounds of Tindalos ==
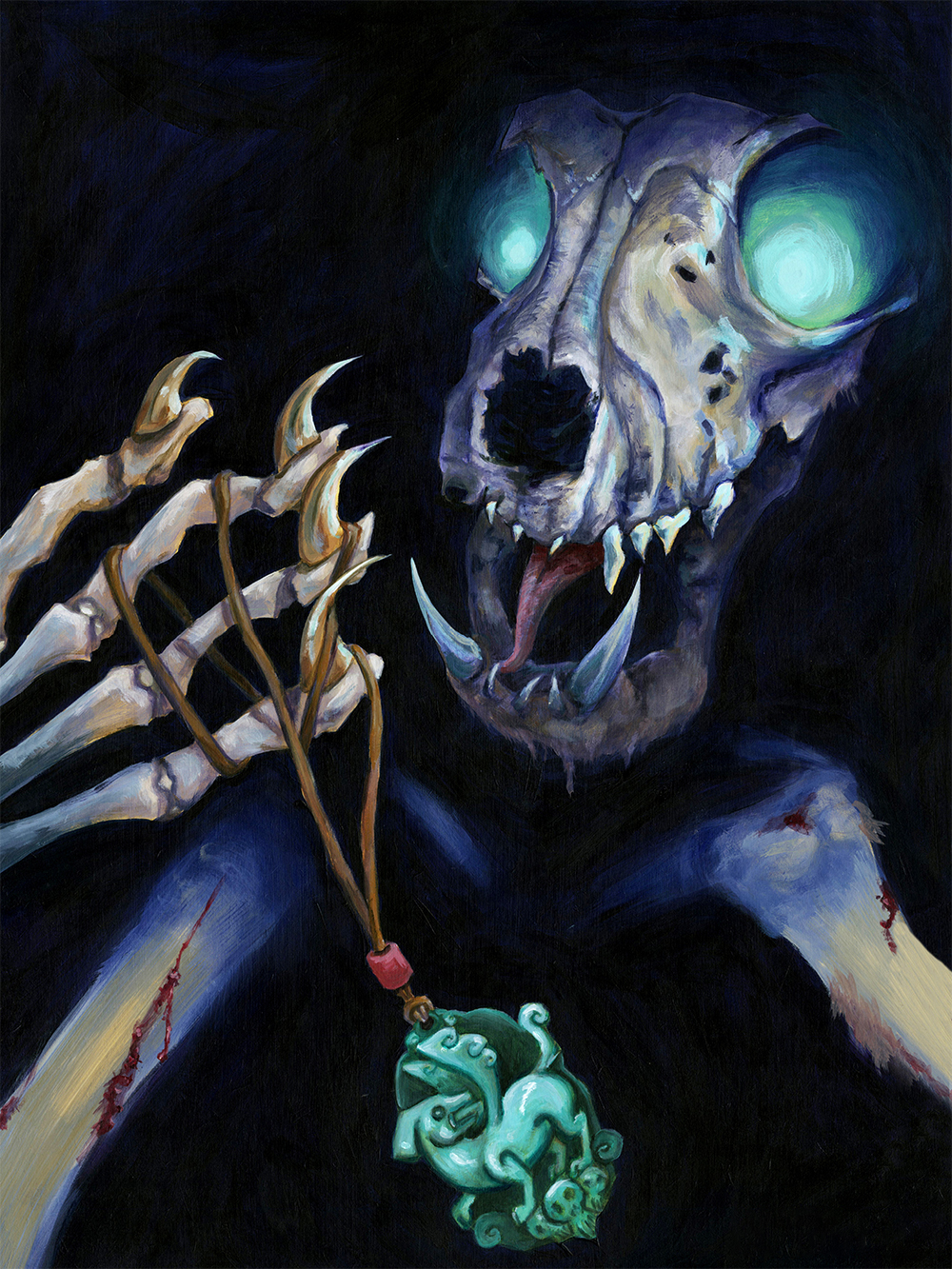
Fan illustration of a Hound of Tindalos

A Hound of Tindalos is a fictional creature created by Frank Belknap Long and later incorporated into the Cthulhu Mythos when it was codified by August Derleth. They first appeared in Long's short story "The Hounds of Tindalos", first published in the March 1929 issue of Weird Tales. Lovecraft mentions the creatures in his short story "The Whisperer in Darkness" (1931).

=== Description ===
In Frank Belknap Long's original story, which deals with the main character experimenting in time travel with the help of psychedelic drugs and esoteric artifacts, the Hounds are said to inhabit the angles of time, while other beings (such as humankind and all common life) descend from curves.

Though the Hounds are sometimes pictured as canine, probably because of the evocative name, their appearance is unknown, since neither Long nor Lovecraft describe them, arguing they are too foul to ever be described. Long's story states that their name "veils their foulness". It is said that they have long, hollow tongues or proboscises to drain victims' body-fluids, and that they excrete a strange blue pus or ichor. They can materialize through any corner if it is fairly sharp—120° or less. When a Hound is about to manifest, it materializes first as smoke pouring from the corner, and finally the head emerges followed by the body. It is said that once a human becomes known to one of these creatures, a Hound of Tindalos will pursue the victim through anything to reach its quarry. A person risks attracting their attention by traveling through time. The only known way to destroy them is by reversing the damage one done to the timeline they traveled.

== Men of Leng ==
See The Dream-Quest of Unknown Kadath.

== Mi-Go ==
The word Mi-Go comes from "Migou", a Tibetan word for yeti. The aliens are fungus-based lifeforms which are extremely varied due to their prodigious surgical, biological, chemical, and mechanical skill. The variants witnessed by Akeley in "The Whisperer in Darkness" look like winged humanoid crabs.

Mi-Go are first named as such in Lovecraft's short story "The Whisperer in Darkness" (1931). However this is considered an elaboration on earlier references in his sonnet cycle Fungi from Yuggoth (1929–30) to descriptions of alien vegetation on dream-worlds.

=== Description ===
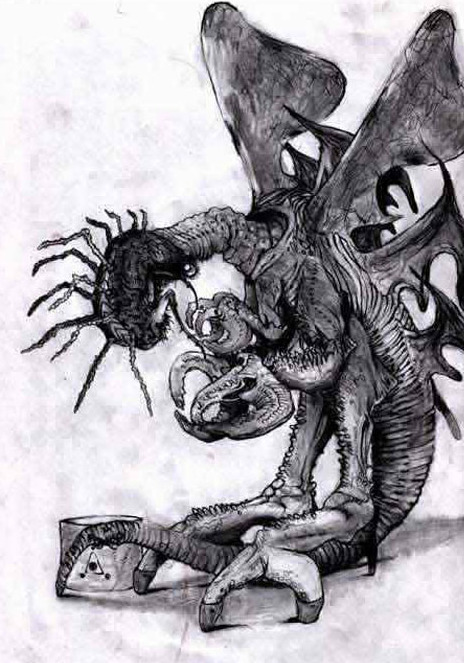
Fan illustration of a Migo

The "Mi-Go" are large, pinkish, fungoid, crustacean-like entities the size of a man; where a head would be, they have a "convoluted ellipsoid" composed of pyramided, fleshy rings and covered in antennae. They are about five feet (1.5 m) long, and their crustacean-like bodies bear numerous sets of paired appendages. They possess a pair of membranous bat-like wings which are used to fly through the "aether" of outer space. The wings do not function well on Earth. Several other races in Lovecraft's Mythos also have wings like these.

In the original short story, the creatures cannot be recorded using ordinary photographic film, due to their bodies being formed from otherworldly matter. They are capable of going into suspended animation until softened and reheated by the sun or some other source of heat.

The Mi-Go can transport humans from Earth to Pluto (and beyond) and back again by removing the subject's living brain and placing it into a "brain cylinder", which can be attached to external devices to allow it to see, hear, and speak.

In The Whisperer in Darkness the Mi-Go are heard to give praise to Nyarlathotep and Shub-Niggurath, suggesting some form of worship. Their moral system is completely alien, making them seem highly malicious from a human perspective.

One of the moons of Yuggoth holds designs that are sacred to the Mi-Go; these are useful in various processes mentioned in the Necronomicon. It is said that transcriptions of these designs can be sensed by the Mi-Go, and those possessing them shall be hunted down by the few remaining on earth.

Supposedly, a group known as the Brotherhood of the Yellow Sign are dedicated to hunting them down and exterminating the fungoid threat, though it is unknown if this is actually true since it was given as a reason for their remaining hidden. Hastur, which is mentioned in passing among several other places and things, was eventually converted into a god-like alien being by August Derleth who gave it the title "Him Who is Not to be Named". However, in "The Whisperer in Darkness", a human ally of the Mi-Go mentions "Him Who Is Not to Be Named" in the list of honored entities along with Nyarlathotep and Shub-Niggurath.

=== Origin of the word ===
It is possible that Lovecraft encountered the word migou in his readings. Migou is the Tibetan equivalent of the yeti, an ape-like cryptid said to inhabit the high mountain ranges of that region. While the Mi-Go of Lovecraft's mythos is completely unlike the migou of Tibetan stories, Lovecraft seems to equate the two, as can be seen in the following excerpt from "The Whisperer in Darkness":

It was of no use to demonstrate to such opponents that the Vermont myths differed but little in essence from those universal legends of natural personification which filled the ancient world with fauns and dryads and satyrs, suggested the kallikanzarai of modern Greece, and gave to wild Wales and Ireland their dark hints of strange, small, and terrible hidden races of troglodytes and burrowers. No use, either, to point out the even more startlingly similar belief of the Nepalese hill tribes in the dreaded Mi-Go or "Abominable Snow-Men" who lurk hideously amidst the ice and rock pinnacles of the Himalayan summits. When I brought up this evidence, my opponents turned it against me by claiming that it must imply some actual historicity for the ancient tales; that it must argue the real existence of some queer elder earth-race, driven to hiding after the advent and dominance of mankind, which might very conceivably have survived in reduced numbers to relatively recent times—or even to the present.

— H. P. Lovecraft, The Whisperer in Darkness

== Moon-beasts ==
See The Dream-Quest of Unknown Kadath.

== Nightgaunts ==
See The Dream-Quest of Unknown Kadath.

== Serpent Men ==
Serpent Men are a fictional race created by Robert E. Howard for his King Kull tales. Lin Carter and Clark Ashton Smith adapted the race for inclusion in the Cthulhu Mythos, inspired by H. P. Lovecraft's short story "The Nameless City", which refers to an Arabian city built by a pre-human reptilian race. Lovecraft's story "The Haunter of the Dark" explicitly mentions the "serpent men of Valusia" as being one-time possessors of the Shining Trapezohedron.

== Shoggoths ==
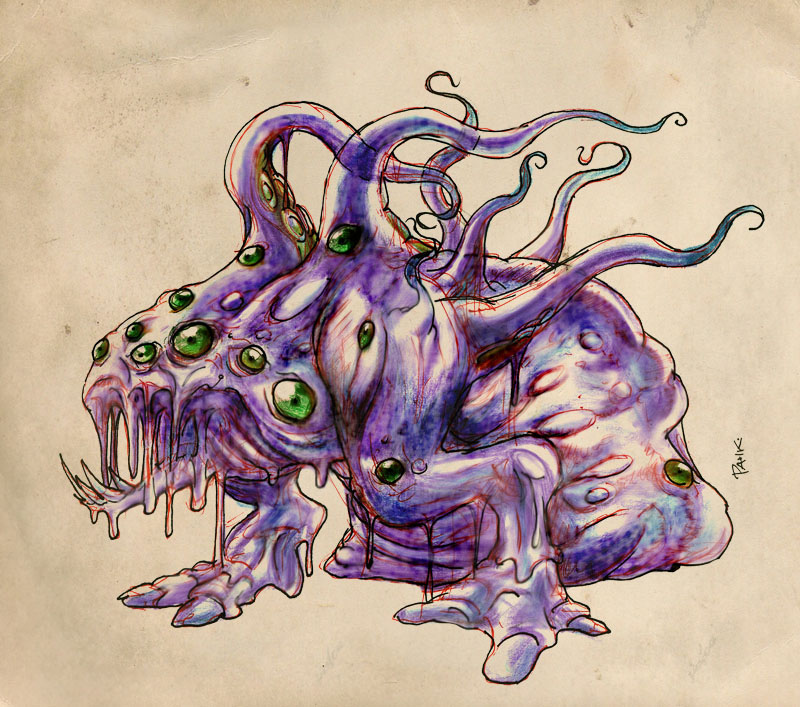
Fan illustration of a shoggoth

Shoggoths (occasionally shaggoth) were mentioned in passing in H. P. Lovecraft's sonnet cycle Fungi from Yuggoth (1929–30) and later described in detail in his novella At the Mountains of Madness (1931).

=== Description ===
It was a terrible, indescribable thing vaster than any subway train—a shapeless congeries of protoplasmic bubbles, faintly self-luminous, and with myriads of temporary eyes forming and un-forming as pustules of greenish light all over the tunnel-filling front that bore down upon us, crushing the frantic penguins and slithering over the glistening floor that it and its kind had swept so evilly free of all litter.

— H. P. Lovecraft, At the Mountains of Madness

The definitive descriptions of shoggoths come from the above-quoted story. In it, Lovecraft describes them as massive amoeba-like creatures made out of iridescent black slime, with multiple eyes "floating" on the surface. They are "protoplasmic", lacking any default body shape and instead being able to form limbs and organs at will. A typical shoggoth measures 15 feet across when a sphere, though the story mentions the existence of others of much greater size. Being amorphous, shoggoths can take on any shape needed, making them very versatile within aquatic environments.

Cthulhu Mythos media most commonly portray shoggoths as intelligent to some degree, but deal with problems using only their great size and strength. The shoggoth that appears in At the Mountains of Madness simply rolls over and crushes numerous giant penguins that are in its way as it pursues human characters.

The character Abdul Alhazred is terrified by the mere idea of shoggoths' existence on Earth.

The shoggoths bear a strong physical resemblance to Ubbo-Sathla, a god-like entity supposedly responsible for the origin of life on Earth.

=== Fictional history ===
At the Mountains of Madness includes a detailed account of the circumstances of the shoggoths' creation by the extraterrestrial Elder Things. Shoggoths were initially used to build the cities of their masters. Though able to "understand" the Elder Things' language, shoggoths had no real consciousness and were controlled through hypnotic suggestion. Over millions of years of existence, some shoggoths mutated, developed independent minds, and rebelled. The Elder Things succeeded in quelling the insurrection, but exterminating the shoggoths was not an option as the Elder Things were dependent on them for labor. Shoggoths also developed the ability to survive on land, while the Elder Things retreated to the oceans. Shoggoths that remained alive in the abandoned Elder Thing city in Antarctica would later imitate their masters' art and voices, endlessly repeating "Tekeli-li" or "Takkeli", a cry that their old masters used.
