= Elder Thing =

Fictional extraterrestrial in the Cthulhu Mythos

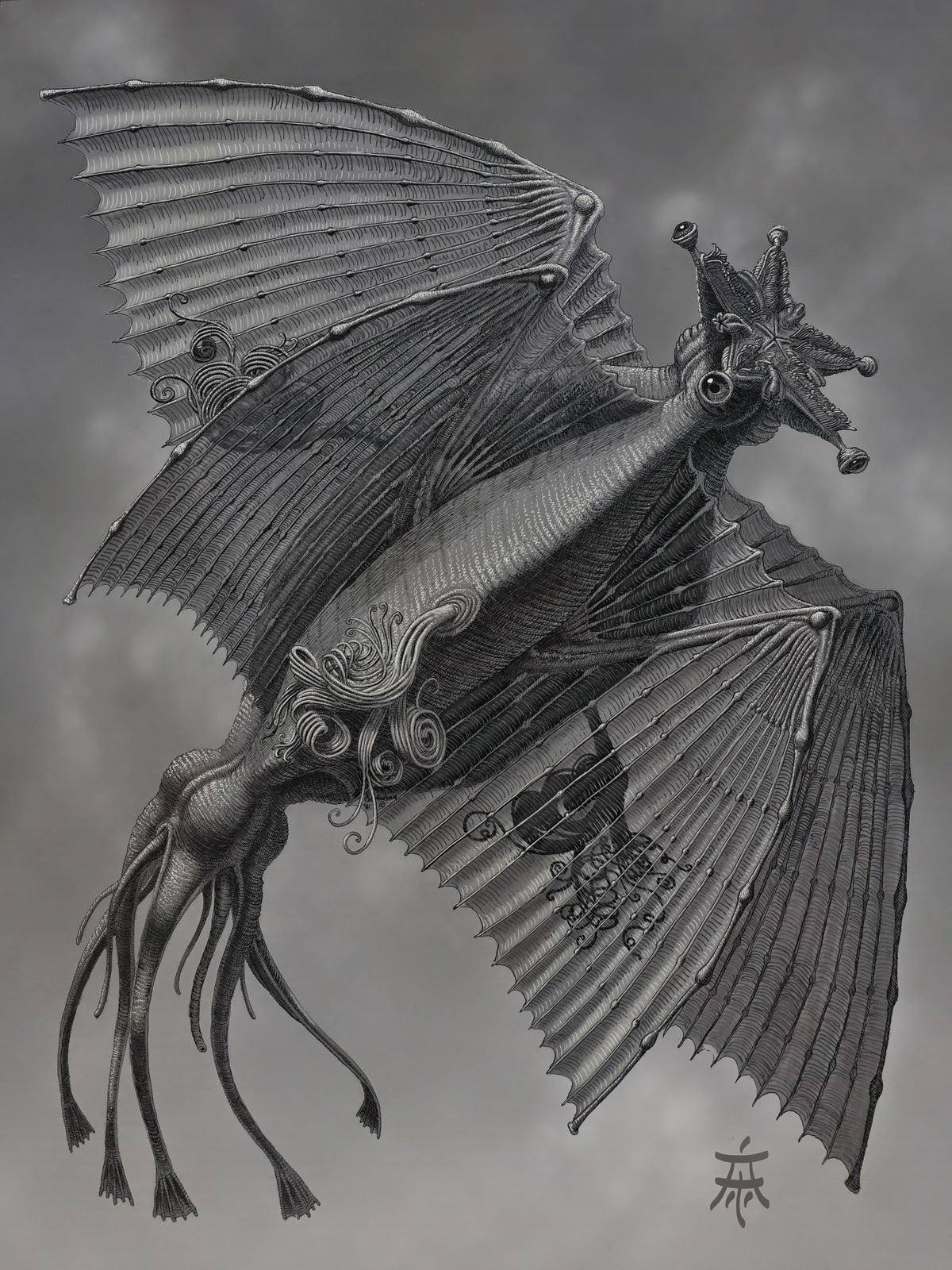
- Fan illustration of a generic Elder Thing specimen
- First appearance: At the Mountains of Madness
- Last appearance: "The Shadow Out of Time"
- Created by: H. P. Lovecraft

In-universe information
- Type: Extraterrestrial life form

The Elder Things (also known as the Old Ones and Elder Ones) are fictional extraterrestrials in the Cthulhu Mythos. The beings first appeared in H. P. Lovecraft's novella, At the Mountains of Madness (published in 1936, but written in 1931), and later appeared, although not named, in the short story "The Dreams in the Witch-House" (1933). Additional references to the Elder Things appear in Lovecraft's short story "The Shadow Out of Time" (1936).

== Description ==
In the Mythos canon, the Elder Things are the first extraterrestrial species to come to the Earth, colonizing the planet about one billion years ago. They stand roughly eight feet tall and have the appearance of a huge, oval-shaped barrel with starfish-like appendages at both ends. The top appendage is a head adorned with five eyes, five eating tubes, and a set of cilia for "seeing" without light. The bottom appendage was five-limbed and was used for walking and other forms of locomotion. The beings also had five leathery, fan-like retractable wings and five sets of branching tentacles that sprouted from their torsos. Both their tentacles and the slits housing their folded wings were spaced at regular intervals about their bodies.

Lovecraft described the Elder Things as vegetable-like or echinoderm-like in shape, having radial symmetry instead of the bilateral symmetry of bipeds. They also differ in that they have a five-lobed brain. The Elder Things exhibit vegetable and animal characteristics and reproduce via spores. Academic John L. Steadman describes the ambiguity over their classification as contributing to their creepiness. They are amphibious, and carnivorous by preference.

The entities are described in At the Mountains of Madness:

Six feet end to end, three and five-tenths feet central diameter, tapering to one foot at each end. Like a barrel with five bulging ridges in place of staves. Lateral breakages, as of thinnish stalks, are at equator in middle of these ridges. In furrows between ridges are curious growths—combs or wings that fold up and spread out like fans ... which gives almost seven-foot wing spread. Arrangement reminds one of certain monsters of primal myth, especially fabled Elder Things in the Necronomicon.

The Elder Things can withstand the pressures of the deepest ocean, interstellar travel, and can hibernate for vast epochs of time. Few die except by accident or violence. Nonetheless, unlike many of Lovecraft's fictional creations, the Elder Things are described as made of normal, terrestrial matter:

The Cthulhu-spawn and the Mi-Go seem to have been composed of matter more widely different from that which we know than was the substance of the Old Ones ... The Old Ones, but for their abnormal toughness and peculiar vital properties, were strictly material, and must have their absolute origin within the known space-time continuum.

Their society is alien, and their motivations are unfathomable to humans. However, a human scientist in At the Mountains of Madness recognizes them as fellow scientists, not monsters. Their science was extremely advanced, and they are depicted as having potentially created life on Earth. Their primary achievement is the creation of a servitor race, the shoggoths, upon which they become increasingly dependent. Although they initially colonized the entirety of Earth, successive wars over millions of years with the Great Race of Yith, the Star-spawn of Cthulhu, the Mi-go, and a rebellion of the Shoggoths weakened them. Radical climate change eventually forced them to abandon most of their great cities. The final fate of the Elder Things is explicitly unclear, and the human scientists in the story speculate that hidden undersea cities may still survive in some places.

In "The Dreams in the Witch-House", the central character is sent through a dimensional portal to a planet in a triple star system located "between Hydra and Argo Navis", which is populated by Elder Things.
