= H.P. Lovecraft's Witch House =

2021 American horror film by Bobby Easley

- Directed by: Bobby Easley
- Written by: Bobby Easley; Ken Wallace
- Produced by: Michael Sherfick Bobby Easley; Ken Wallace
- Starring: Portia Chellelynn; Julie Anne Prescott; Andrea Collins; Erin Trimble; Solon Tsangaras; John Johnson
- Cinematography: J.D. Brenton
- Edited by: J.D. Brenton; Joe Petrilla
- Music by: Dyllen Nance
- Production company: Horror Wasteland Pictures International
- Release date: 2021
- Running time: 82 minutes
- Country: United States
- Language: English

H.P. Lovecraft's Witch House is a 2021 American horror film directed by Bobby Easley, starring Portia Chellelynn, Julie Anne Prescott, Andrea Collins, Erin Trimble, Solon Tsangaras and John Johnson. It is a loose adaptation of H. P. Lovecraft's The Dreams in the Witch House.

== Cast ==
- Portia Chellelynn as Alice Gilmann
- Julie Anne Prescott as Tommi/Coven
- Andrea Collins as Keziah Mason
- Erin Trimble as Kelly
- Solon Tsangaras as Brown Jenkin
- John Johnson as Professor Sherfick/Satan
- Shonda Laverty as Etta
- Joe Padgett as Joe

== Release ==
The film released on digital and DVD on 5 July 2022.

== Reception ==
On Rotten Tomatoes, the film has an approval rating of 33% based on 9 reviews. Payton McCarty-Simas of Film Inquiry wrote that while the film's ambitions "exceed its scope, often to the detriment of a fully fleshed-out narrative and satisfying character development", it still "delivers several effective, psychedelic scenes of suspense and an enjoyable atmosphere of supernatural anxiety."

John Townsend of Starburst rated the film 2 stars out of 5 and wrote: "As far as Lovecraftian adaptations go Witch House is a perfectly acceptable, if rather uninspiring addition. But in attempting to fill out the runtime Easley has lost sight of what really makes this story an intriguing and ultimately horrific one."

Cody Hamman of JoBlo.com gave the film a score of 4/10 and wrote: "A cheap look is easily overcome when the story and/or characters are interesting enough… but the storytelling here is very messy and scattered, and the characters aren’t interesting." Sarah Vincent of Cambridge Day rated the film 1 star out of 4. writing that it "relies on stale Satanic and witch-coven horror tropes".

Michael Talbot-Haynes of Film Threat gave the film a mostly positive review, praising its plot and lead actors, as well as the addition of a mostly female cast and queer narratives.
