= Nyarlathotep =

Fictional Lovecraftian god

- Cthulhu Mythos character
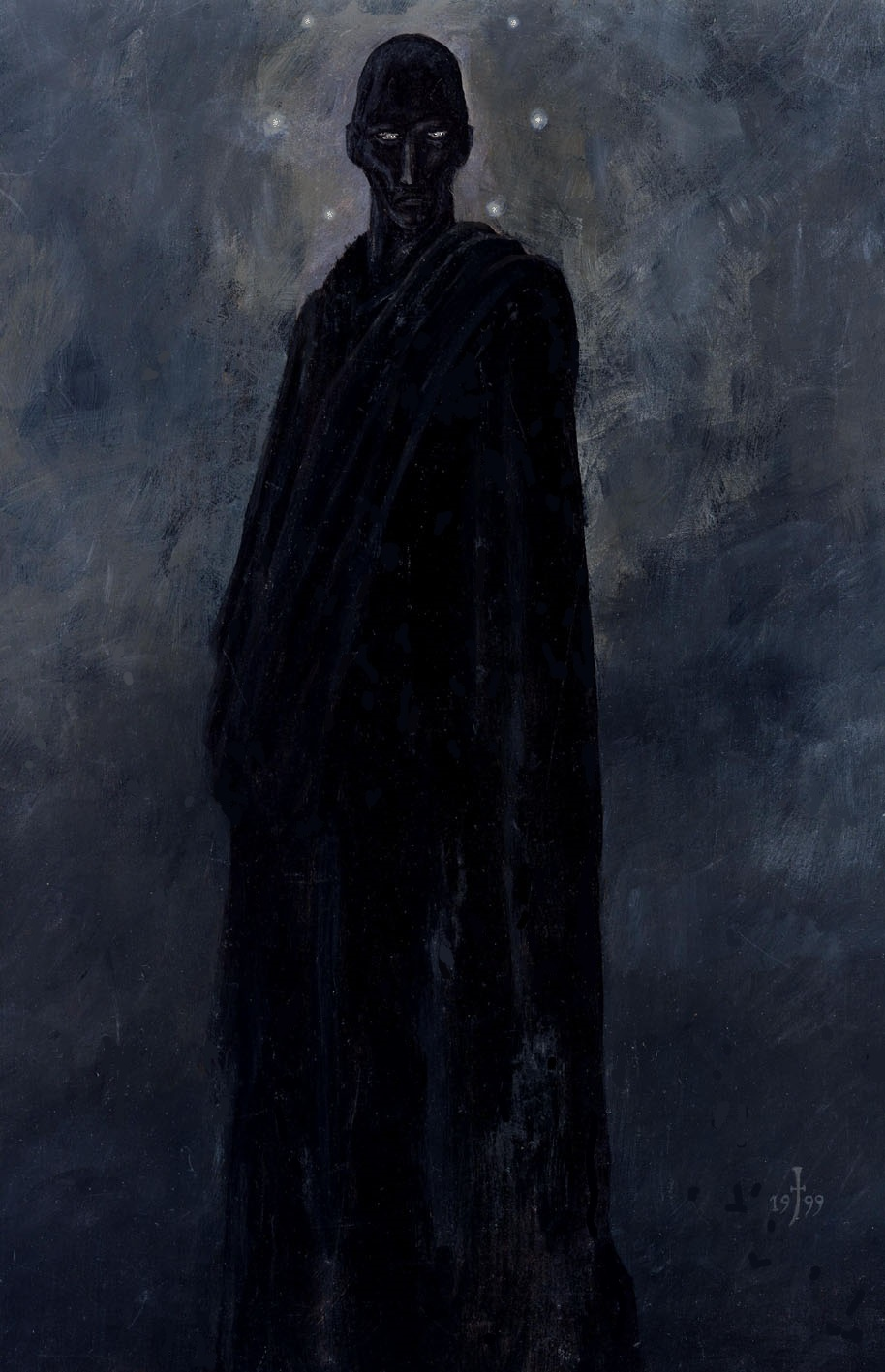
- Nyarlathotep, described as the Black Man in H. P. Lovecraft's story "The Dreams in the Witch House".
- First appearance: "Nyarlathotep"
- Created by: H. P. Lovecraft

In-universe information
- Species: Outer God
- Gender: Male
- Titles: Crawling Chaos; God of a Thousand Forms; Stalker among the Stars; Black Pharaoh; Faceless God; Soul and Messenger of the Other Gods
- Family: Azathoth (father); Nameless Mist (sibling); Darkness (sibling)

Nyarlathotep is a character created by H. P. Lovecraft. The character is a malign deity in the Cthulhu Mythos, a shared universe. First appearing in Lovecraft's 1920 prose poem "Nyarlathotep", he was later mentioned in other works by Lovecraft and by other writers, to the point of often being considered the main antagonist of the Cthulhu Mythos as a whole. He is presented as the messenger of Azathoth. He is later described by other authors as being part of the Outer Gods, an alien pantheon.

== Appearances ==
=== In the works of H. P. Lovecraft ===
In his first appearance in "Nyarlathotep" (1920), he is described as a "tall, swarthy man" who resembles an ancient Egyptian pharaoh. In this story he wanders the Earth, seemingly gathering legions of followers, the narrator of the story among them, through his demonstrations of strange and seemingly magical instruments. These followers lose awareness of the world around them, and through the narrator's increasingly unreliable accounts, the reader gets an impression of the world's collapse. Fritz Leiber proposes three interpretations of the character based on this appearance: the universe's mockery of man's attempts to understand it; a negative view of the commercial world, represented by Nyarlathotep's self-promotion and contemptuous attitude; and man's self-destructive rationality.

Nyarlathotep subsequently appears as a major character in The Dream Quest of Unknown Kadath (1926/27), in which he again manifests in the form of an Egyptian pharaoh when he confronts protagonist Randolph Carter. Leiber describes Nyarlathotep as "evilly intelligent" in this story, in contrast to the mindless Azathoth, his master.

The 21st sonnet of Lovecraft's poem-cycle Fungi from Yuggoth (1929/30) is essentially a retelling of the original prose poem.

In "The Dreams in the Witch House" (1933), Nyarlathotep appears to Walter Gilman and witch Keziah Mason (who has made a pact with the entity) in the form of "the 'Black Man' of the witch-cult", a black-skinned avatar of the Devil described by witch hunters. Although inhuman, some characters mistake him as a human of African descent, though his facial features are described as Caucasian.

Finally, in "The Haunter of the Dark" (1936), the nocturnal, tentacled, bat-winged monster dwelling in the steeple of the Starry Wisdom sect's church is identified as another manifestation of Nyarlathotep. This avatar cannot tolerate light.

Lovecraft suggests that the fake Henry Akeley that appears at the end of "The Whisperer in Darkness" (1930) is also Nyarlathotep. In the story, the Mi-Go chant his name in reverential tones, stating "To Nyarlathotep, Mighty Messenger, must all things be told. And he shall put on the semblance of man, the waxen mask and the robes that hide, and come down from the world of Seven Suns to mock." At the end of "The Whisperer in Darkness", the main character to his horror discovers a loose dressing gown and the severed head and arms of Akeley lying on the couch, presumed in the story to have been a Mi-Go in disguise. But due to the mention in the chant to Nyarlathotep wearing the "waxen mask and the robes that hide", S. T. Joshi writes that "this seems a clear allusion to Nyarlathotep disguised with Akeley's face and hands; but if so, it means that at this time Nyarlathotep is, in bodily form, one of the fungi — especially if, as seems likely, Nyarlathotep is one of the two buzzing voices Albert Wilmarth overhears at the end." Joshi notes this is problematic, because "if Nyarlathotep is (as critics have termed it) a 'shapeshifter', why would he have to don the face and hands of Akeley instead of merely reshaping himself as Akeley?"

Though Nyarlathotep appears as a character in only four stories and two sonnets, his name is mentioned frequently in other works. In "The Rats in the Walls" (1924), Nyarlathotep is mentioned as a faceless god in the caverns of Earth's center. In The Shadow Out of Time (1936), the "hideous secret of Nyarlathotep" is revealed to the protagonist by Khephnes during their imprisonment by the Great Race of Yith.

Nyarlathotep does not appear in Lovecraft's story "The Crawling Chaos" (1920/21), despite the similarity of the title to the character's epithet. Lovecraft wrote to a correspondent that he reused the phrase because he "liked the sound of it".

=== Other appearances ===
Nyarlathotep has also appeared outside of Lovecraft's own writings. The light novel and anime series Haiyore! Nyaruko-san (2009) is based on the Cthulhu mythos, with the main character Nyaruko directly referring to Nyarlathotep.

Masks of Nyarlathotep is a globe-spanning adventure campaign for the Call of Cthulhu roleplaying game, first published in 1984.

In the Delta Green roleplaying game, Nyarlathotep is frequently portrayed as the ultimate hidden architect behind seemingly unrelated conspiracies and supernatural threats, manipulating events from behind the scenes through proxies and cults, often acting through multiple avatars. Whether these avatars are aware of one another or operate independently under Nyarlathotep's influence is generally left deliberately ambiguous.

Nyarlathotep appears in the guise of the Dark Man in Larry Correia's story "Dead Waits Dreaming" (2013).

Though he does not appear in Lovecraft's original short story, Nyarlathotep in his "Black Man" form appears in the 1993 Caliber Comics adaption of The Music of Erich Zann, in flashbacks for the eponymous Erich Zann.

Alan Moore's limited comic series Neonomicon (2010–2011) utilizes Nyarlathotep in the form of Johnny Carcosa, a masked drug dealer who frequents Cthulhu-themed clubs and occult shops. His manner of converting new followers is to place them in a vegetative state, susceptible to "Aklo"—words related to Lovecraft's work, which alter the consciousness of those who listen to them. In Moore's story, he serves the allegorical role of the Archangel Gabriel at the Annunciation, informing the protagonist that she has been impregnated and will soon give birth to Cthulhu. Carcosa takes a more active role in Moore's follow-up volume Providence, "rewarding" the protagonist, Robert Black, for his work as the "herald" of H. P. Lovecraft's effects on the world and later overseeing the birth of Cthulhu.

In the video game Dusk, Nyarlathotep appears as the final enemy encounter. Instead of taking the form of a humanoid in the fight, however, he takes the form of a leviathan eldritch beast. How he has been worked into the plot is deliberately very vague, as he only appears at the very end, though it is clear that he was up to the trickery and manipulation of his past portrayals.

In the manga series Ghost Reaper Girl the head of the Eastern Branch is a woman called Nyarlathotep who uses the title "The Chaos". She is a dark skinned woman, with the lower half of the eye of Horus below her right eye.

Nyarlathotep is featured in several of the Shin Megami Tensei video games, as well as the Persona spin-offs, including Revelations: Persona and also the Persona 2 duology, in which he is the main antagonist. He showcases shape shifting abilities there, by donning several characters' appearances and when fought as "himself", changes to a more unsettling and tentacled appearance. Although it can be noted that when defeated for the last time, he switches back to the human appearance of one of the playable characters.

In Charles Stross' series The Laundry Files, a human avatar of Nyarlathotep under the name Fabian Everyman becomes UK's prime minister.

In the mobile video game Dragalia Lost, there is a dragon named Nyarlathotep who appears in the Accursed Archives raid event.

Nyarlathotep appears as a playable unit in the 2016 Japanese mobile game Tokyo Afterschool Summoners, where he is depicted as a popular DJ with a rep for causing chaos simply to cause chaos.

Nyarlathotep is the focus of an augmented reality game distributed by The Mysterious Package Company.

Nyarlathotep appears in the loosely-based 'Azathoth Rising' by Joseph S. Dale, as the guardian of the Necronomicon, as he tries to make wizards and other people of power use the spells in the book ostensibly to gain power.

In the 2007 visual novel Shikkoku no Sharnoth: What a Beautiful Tomorrow, Nyarlathotep is revealed to be the true identity of the character simply named 'the M'. The dimension of Sharnoth which is closely associated with Nyarlathotep also plays a significant part in the game's story.

In the 2017 game Sundered, Nyarlathotep appears as the final boss, the god of a group of worshippers based on Lovecraftian mythology.

In the podcast Malevolent created by Harlan Guthrie, Nyarlathotep appears as an enigmatic, manic, unpredictable and dramatic antagonist. In the podcast he uses the name Kayne, but is later revealed to be Nyarlathotep.

In the 2020 film The Empty Man, the tentacled form of Nyarlathotep appears as the end when it enters/possesses James, the main character of the film. Also In the second half of the film where there is a large cult chanting around a bonfire, they are all chanting "Nyarlathotep" at the end of their chant.

Nyarlathotep makes an appearance in the 2022 video game Sucker for Love: First Date, as well as in its 2024 sequel, Sucker for Love: Date to Die For, as a character named Nyanlahotep, a female catgirl version of Nyarlathotep.

== Inspiration ==
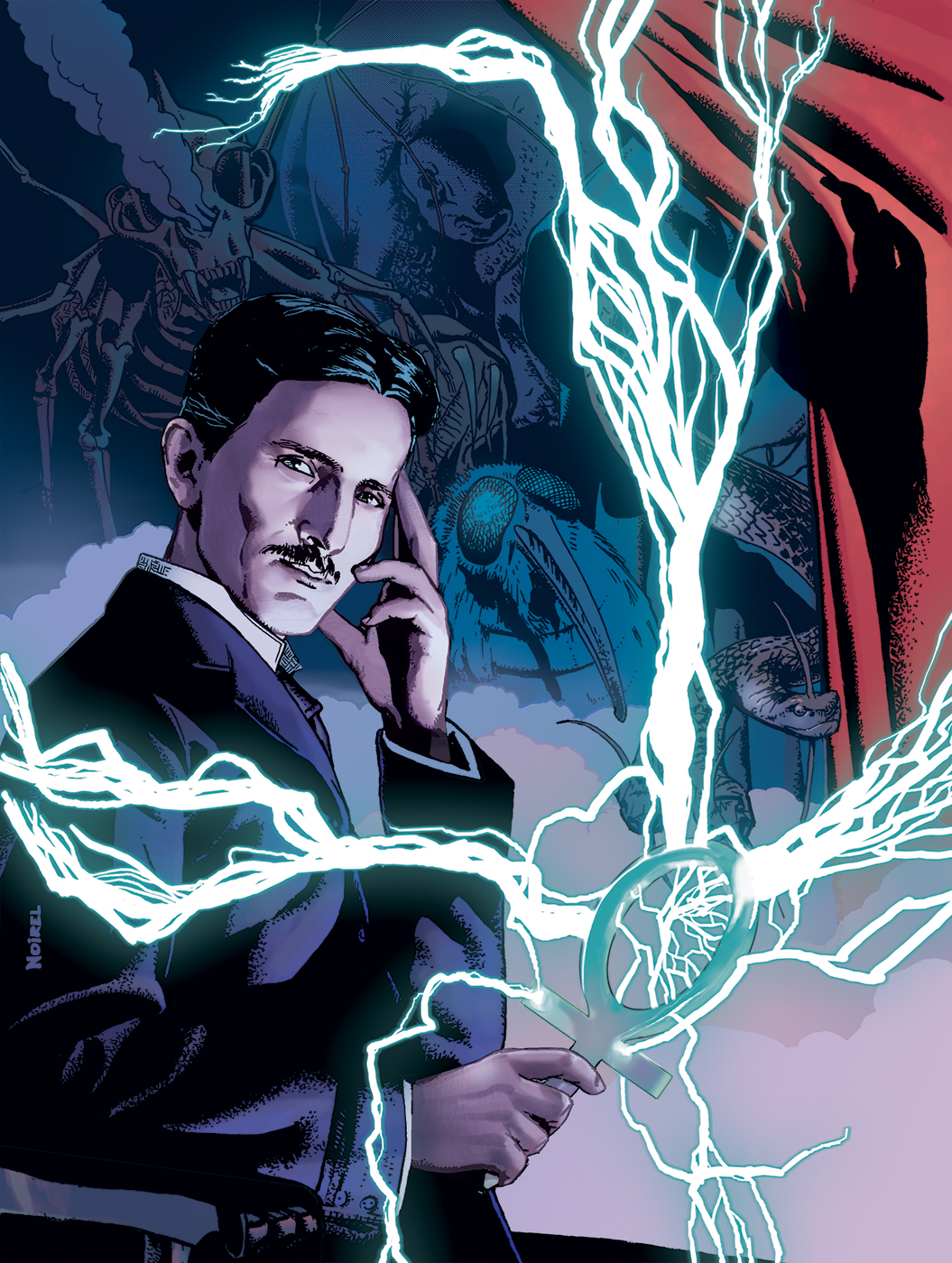
Nyarlathotep in the guise of Nikola Tesla in Rotomago and Julien Noirel's comic-book adaptation of the prose poem "Nyarlathotep".

In a 1921 letter to Reinhardt Kleiner, Lovecraft related the dream he had had—described as "the most realistic and horrible [nightmare] I have experienced since the age of ten"—that served as the basis for his prose poem "Nyarlathotep". In the dream, he received a letter from his friend Samuel Loveman that read:

Don't fail to see Nyarlathotep if he comes to Providence. He is horrible—horrible beyond anything you can imagine—but wonderful. He haunts one for hours afterwards. I am still shuddering at what he showed.

Lovecraft commented:

I had never heard the name Nyarlathotep before, but seemed to understand the allusion. Nyarlathotep was a kind of itinerant showman or lecturer who held forth in public halls and aroused widespread fear and discussion with his exhibitions. These exhibitions consisted of two parts—first, a horrible—possibly prophetic—cinema reel; and later some extraordinary experiments with scientific and electrical apparatus. As I received the letter, I seemed to recall that Nyarlathotep was already in Providence… I seemed to remember that persons had whispered to me in awe of his horrors, and warned me not to go near him. But Loveman's dream letter decided me… As I left the house I saw throngs of men plodding through the night, all whispering affrightedly and bound in one direction. I fell in with them, afraid yet eager to see and hear the great, the obscure, the unutterable Nyarlathotep.

Will Murray has speculated that this dream image of Nyarlathotep may have been inspired by the inventor Nikola Tesla, whose well-attended lectures did involve extraordinary experiments with electrical apparatus and whom some saw as a sinister figure.

Robert M. Price proposes that the name Nyarlathotep may have been subconsciously suggested to Lovecraft by two names from Lord Dunsany, an author he much admired. Alhireth-Hotep, a false prophet, appears in Dunsany's The Gods of Pegana, and Mynarthitep, a god described as "angry", appears in Dunsany's "The Sorrow of Search".

== Summary ==
Nyarlathotep differs from the other beings in a number of ways. Most of them are exiled to stars, like Yog-Sothoth and Hastur, or sleeping and dreaming like Cthulhu; Nyarlathotep, however, is active and frequently walks the Earth in the guise of a human being, usually a tall, slim, joyless man. He has "a thousand" other forms, most of these reputed to be maddeningly horrific. Most of the Outer Gods have their own cults serving them; Nyarlathotep seems to serve these cults and take care of the deities' affairs in their absence. Most of the gods use strange alien languages, but Nyarlathotep uses human languages and can be mistaken for a human being. The other Outer Gods and Great Old Ones are often described as mindless or unfathomable rather than truly malevolent, but Nyarlathotep delights in cruelty, is deceptive and manipulative, and even cultivates followers and uses propaganda to achieve his goals.

Nyarlathotep enacts the will of the Outer Gods, and is their messenger, heart and soul; he is also a servant of Azathoth, his father, whose wishes he immediately fulfills. Unlike the other Outer Gods, causing madness is more important and enjoyable than death and destruction to Nyarlathotep. It is suggested by some that he will destroy the human race and possibly the Earth as well.

Nyarlathotep is an immensely powerful being, as he is able to take anything to the throne of Azathoth, which is at the center of Ultimate Chaos. He also envelops the world in darkness and causes waves of destruction to emanate from "ultimate space", and he also causes groups of people to go insane. Nyarlathotep also knows the truths and futures of things that are incomprehensible to the human mind.

== The Nyarlathotep Cycle ==
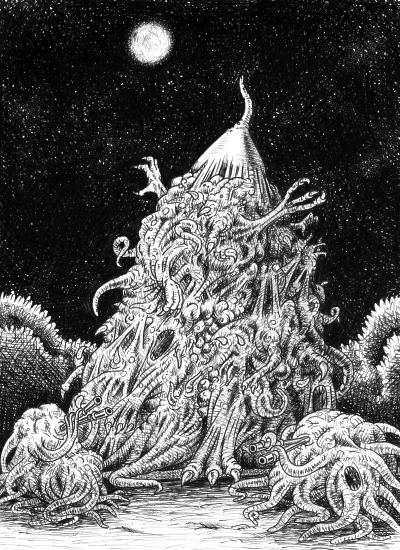
Nyarlathotep in "The Dweller in Darkness" by August Derleth

In 1996, Chaosium published The Nyarlathotep Cycle, a Cthulhu Mythos anthology focusing on works referring to or inspired by the entity Nyarlathotep. Edited by Lovecraft scholar Robert M. Price, the book includes an introduction by Price tracing the roots and development of the God of a Thousand Forms. The contents include:

- "Alhireth-Hotep the Prophet" by Lord Dunsany
- "The Sorrow of Search" by Lord Dunsany
- "Nyarlathotep" by H. P. Lovecraft
- "The Second Coming" (poem) by William Butler Yeats
- "Silence Falls on Mecca's Walls" (poem) by Robert E. Howard
- "Nyarlathotep" (poem) by H. P. Lovecraft
- "The Dreams in the Witch House" by H. P. Lovecraft
- "The Haunter of the Dark" by H. P. Lovecraft
- "The Dweller in Darkness" by August Derleth
- "The Titan in the Crypt" by J. G. Warner
- "Fane of the Black Pharaoh" by Robert Bloch
- "Curse of the Black Pharaoh" by Lin Carter
- "The Curse of Nephren-Ka" by John Cockroft
- "The Temple of Nephren-Ka" by Philip J. Rahman & Glenn A. Rahman
- "The Papyrus of Nephren-Ka" by Robert C. Culp
- "The Snout in the Alcove" by Gary Myers
- "The Contemplative Sphinx" (poem) by Richard L. Tierney
- "Ech-Pi-El's Ægypt" (poems) by Ann K. Schwader
