= Big Dumb Object =

Plot device in science fiction

The mysterious, featureless monolith from Arthur C. Clarke's 2001: A Space Odyssey

In discussion of science fiction, a Big Dumb Object (BDO) is any mysterious object, usually of extraterrestrial or unknown origin and immense power, in a story which generates an intense sense of wonder by its mere existence. To a certain extent, the term deliberately deflates the intended grandeur of the mysterious object.

The coining of the term has been attributed to reviewer Roz Kaveney in 1981, but it was not in general use until Peter Nicholls included it in The Encyclopedia of Science Fiction as a joke in 1993.

Edward Guimont and Horace A. Smith propose that the origins of the Big Dumb Object trope can be found in H. P. Lovecraft's novellas At the Mountains of Madness and The Shadow Out of Time, both of which feature human expeditions to immense ancient alien cities in remote parts of our world, and both of which were early influences upon Arthur C. Clarke.

== List of examples ==
Big Dumb Objects often exhibit extreme or unusual properties, or a total absence of some expected properties:

- The monolith in Stanley Kubrick and Arthur C. Clarke's 1968 film 2001: A Space Odyssey (foreshadowed in the 1951 short story "The Sentinel") is an indecipherable influence upon the protohumans, to whom it first appears. Later in the film, the monolith serves to show how little humans have evolved. The astronaut Bowman's attempt to interact with the monolith only makes him a part of its mystery.
- In Arthur C. Clarke's 1973 novel Rendezvous with Rama, a 50-kilometre-long (31.1 mi) cylinder is detected entering the Solar System. A similar cylindrical probe of gargantuan dimensions threatens Earth in Star Trek IV: The Voyage Home.
- The object discovered in Quatermass and the Pit was made of a material of extreme hardness, such that diamond-tipped drills and acetylene torches would not damage it. At the same time nothing would adhere to it.
- Charles Sheffield's Heritage Universe setting features many immense alien artifacts, some of which are more inscrutable than others.
- The Marker from Dead Space emits a persistent electromagnetic field from seemingly no source, which could be used to provide limitless energy. Attempting to reverse engineer the Marker, scientists discover that the electromagnetic fields generated by the Marker cause living people to suffer paranoia and hallucinations, while also causing the dead to reanimate, becoming "Necromorphs".
- In the 1998 film based on Michael Crichton's novel Sphere, the eponymous object would reflect everything in its presence except people. If it did reflect someone, they were alone, and the individual was accepted as worthy to harness the device's power.
- In Iain Banks's novel Against a Dark Background, the Lazy Guns have a lot of mass and yet little weight, and weigh three times as much upside-down as upright.
  - By the same author, the titular Excession is a blackbody sphere that appears on the edge of Culture space and remains in position being inscrutable (even to Culture technology).
- The dome from the Stephen King novel and television show Under the Dome is large and transparent unless touched by a person; it gives a slight electric shock when touched for the first time by someone, but not afterward. It cannot be penetrated, even by a MOAB bomb, and is seemingly causing many mysterious events in Chester's Mill, the town that the dome is enclosing, including causing all electronic devices near it to explode, visions, and, in one character, premature birth.
- In Dan Simmons's 1989 novel Hyperion, the mysterious Time Tombs, "huge brooding structures" which are moving backwards through time, and whose purpose, origin, and nature are not explained in the book, are the objective of the characters' pilgrimage.

Such unexpected properties are usually used to rule out conventional origins for the BDO and increase the sense of mystery, and even fear, for the characters interacting with it.

== See also ==
- Big dumb booster – Concept in cost efficiency of rocket design
- Dyson sphere – Hypothetical megastructure around a star
- MacGuffin – Story plot device
- Megastructure – Very large artificial object
- Ringworld – 1970 science fiction novel by Larry Niven
