= At the Mountains of Madness =

1936 novella by H. P. Lovecraft

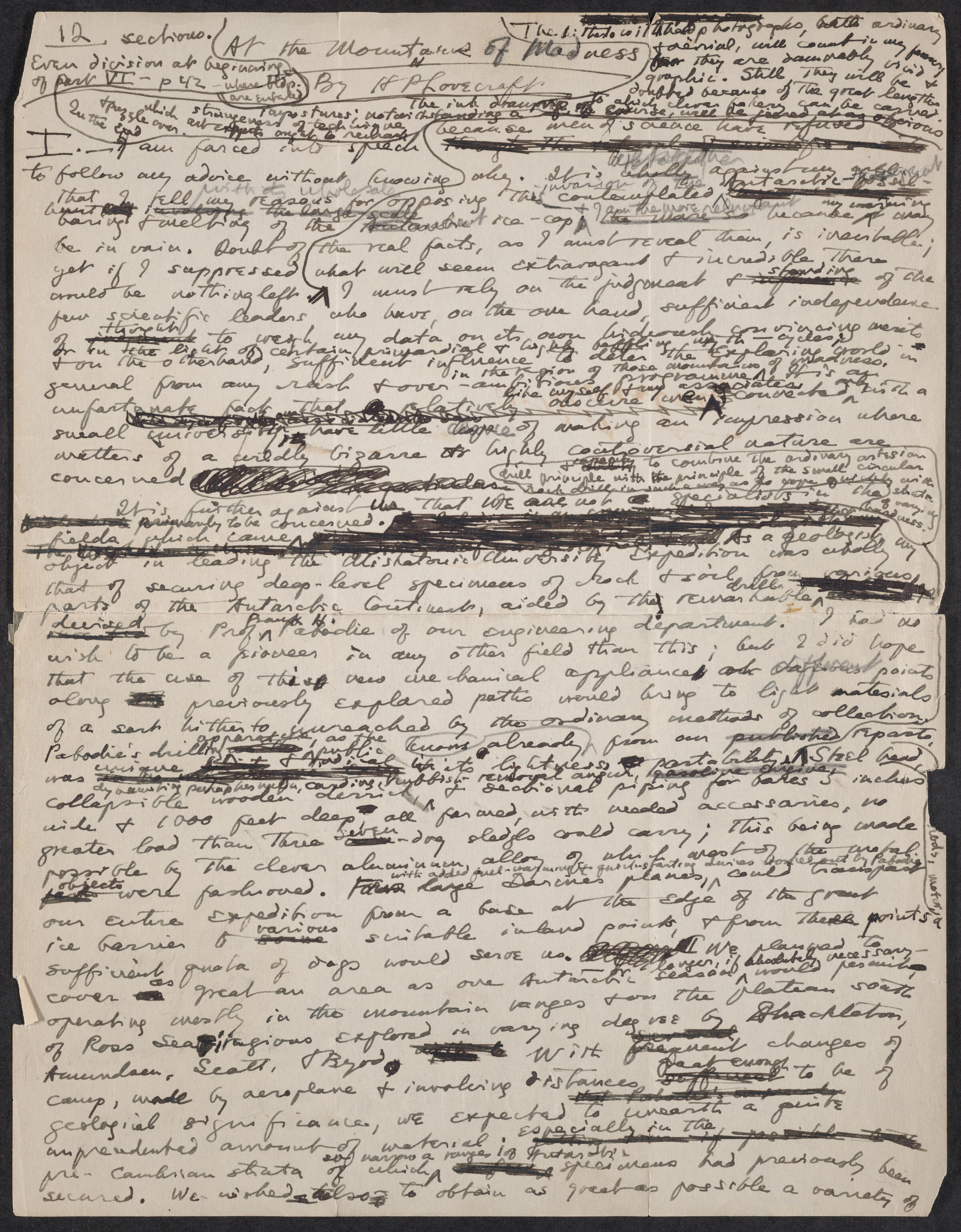
- First page of the manuscript
- Author: H. P. Lovecraft
- Cover artist: Howard V. Brown
- Language: English
- Genre: Science-fiction, cosmic horror
- Published: February–April 1936 (Astounding Stories)
- Publication place: United States
- Media type: Print (periodical)

At the Mountains of Madness is a science-fiction and cosmic horror novella by the American author H. P. Lovecraft, written in February–March 1931 and published in three installments in 1936. Rejected that year by Weird Tales editor Farnsworth Wright on the grounds of its length, it was originally serialized in the February, March, and April 1936 issues of Astounding Stories. It has been reproduced in numerous collections.

The story details the events of a disastrous expedition to Antarctica in September 1930, and what is found there by a group of explorers led by the narrator, Dr. William Dyer of Miskatonic University. Throughout the story, Dyer details a series of previously untold events in the hope of deterring another group of explorers who wish to return to the continent. These events include the discovery of an ancient civilization older than the human race, and realization of Earth's past told through various sculptures and murals.

The story was inspired by Lovecraft's interest in Antarctic exploration; the continent was still not fully explored in the 1930s. Lovecraft explicitly draws from Edgar Allan Poe's novel The Narrative of Arthur Gordon Pym of Nantucket, and he may have used other stories for inspiration. Many story elements, such as the formless "shoggoth", recur in other Lovecraft works. The story has been adapted and used for graphic novels, video games, and musical works.

== Plot ==
The story is narrated in a first-person perspective by the geologist William Dyer, a professor at Miskatonic University in Arkham, Massachusetts, aiming to prevent an important and much-publicized scientific expedition to Antarctica. Throughout the course of his explanation, Dyer relates how he led a group of scholars from the university on a previous expedition to Antarctica, during which they discovered ancient ruins and a dangerous secret beyond a range of mountains higher than the Himalayas.

A small advance group, led by Professor Lake, discovers the remains of fourteen prehistoric lifeforms previously unknown to science, and also unidentifiable as either plants or animals. Six of the specimens have been badly damaged, while another eight have been preserved in pristine condition. The specimens' stratum places them far too early on the geologic time scale for the features of the specimens to have evolved. Some fossils of Cambrian age show signs of the use of tools to carve a specimen for food.

When the main expedition loses contact with Lake's party, Dyer and a graduate student named Danforth investigate. Lake's camp is devastated, with the majority of men and dogs slaughtered, while a man named Gedney and one of the dogs are absent. Near the expedition's campsite, they find six star-shaped snow mounds with one specimen under each. They also discover that the better-preserved lifeforms have vanished, and that some form of dissection experiment has been done on both an unnamed man and a dog. Gedney is suspected of having gone insane and killed and mutilated the others.

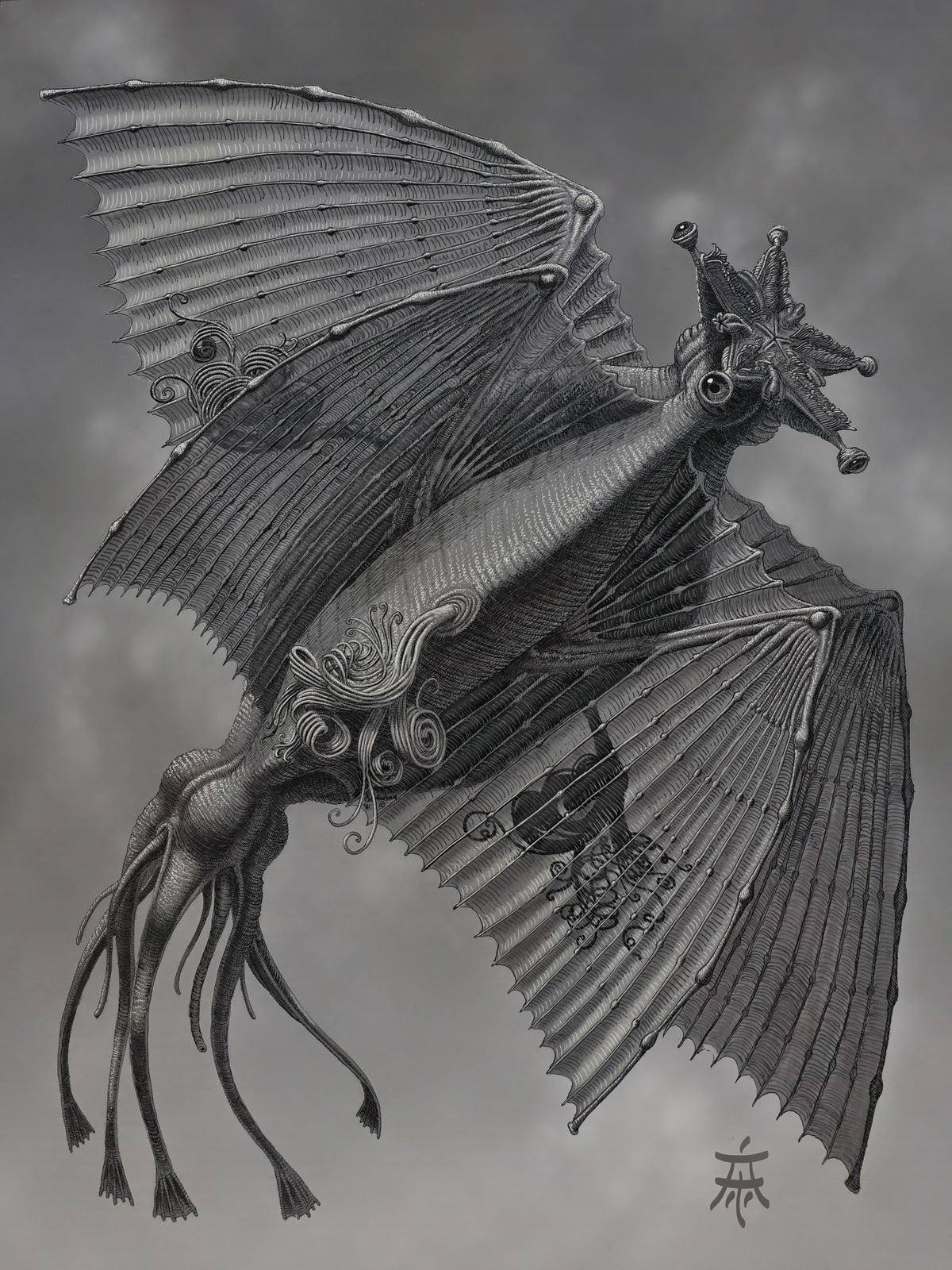
A generic Elder Thing specimen (illustration by Tom Ardans)

Dyer and Danforth fly an aeroplane across the "mountains", soon revealed to be the outer walls of a vast, abandoned stone city, alien to any human architecture. For their resemblance to creatures of myth mentioned in the Necronomicon, the builders of this lost civilization are dubbed the "Elder Things." By exploring these fantastic structures, the explorers learn through hieroglyphic murals that the Elder Things first came to Earth shortly after the Moon took form and built their cities with the help of "shoggoths"—biological entities created to perform any task, assume any form and reflect any thought. There is a hint that all Earthly life evolved from cellular material left over from the creation of the shoggoths.

As more buildings are explored, the explorers learn about the Elder Things' conflict with both the Star-spawn of Cthulhu and the Mi-Go, who arrived on Earth shortly afterwards. The images also reflect a degradation of their civilization once the shoggoths gained independence. As more resources are applied in maintaining order, the etchings become haphazard and primitive. The murals also allude to an unnamed evil lurking within an even larger mountain range located beyond the city. This mountain range rose in one night and certain phenomena and incidents deterred the Elder Things from exploring it. When Antarctica became uninhabitable, even for the Elder Things, they soon migrated into a large, subterranean ocean.

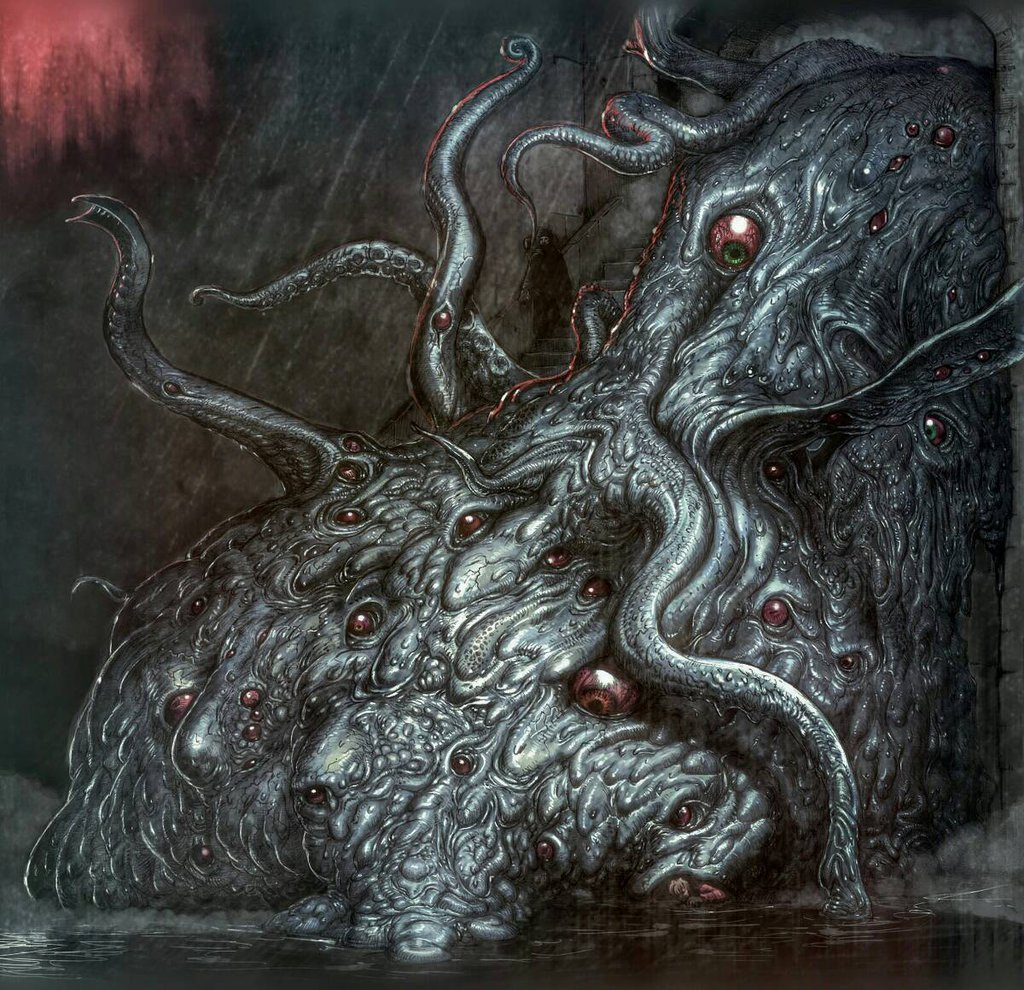
A Shoggoth (illustration by Nottsuo)

Dyer and Danforth eventually realize that the Elder Things missing from the advance party's camp had somehow returned to life and, after killing the party, have returned to their city. They also discover traces of the Elder Things' earlier exploration, as well as sleds containing the corpses of both Gedney and his missing dog. Both are ultimately drawn towards the entrance of a tunnel, into the subterranean region depicted in the murals. Here, they find evidence of various Elder Things killed in a brutal struggle and blind six-foot-tall penguins wandering placidly, apparently used as livestock. They are then confronted by a black, bubbling mass, which they identify as a shoggoth, and escape. Aboard the plane, high above the plateau, Danforth looks back and sees something which causes him to go insane, implied to be the unnamed evil itself.

Dyer concludes the Elder Things are survivors of a bygone era, who slaughtered Lake's group only in self-defense or scientific curiosity. Their civilization was eventually destroyed by the shoggoths, which now prey on the enormous penguins. He warns the planners of the proposed expedition to stay away from the site. Danforth continues to experience manic episodes, whispering of "bizarre conceptions" which Dyer attributes to his being one of the few to have completely read through Miskatonic's copy of the Necronomicon.

== Connections to other Lovecraft stories ==
At the Mountains of Madness has numerous connections to other Lovecraft stories. A few include:

- The formless Shoggoths later appeared in "The Shadow over Innsmouth" (1931), "The Thing on the Doorstep" (1933), and "The Haunter of the Dark" (1935)
- The star-headed Elder Things also appear in "The Dreams in the Witch House" (1933), when the main character, Walter Gilman, visits a city of theirs in one of his dreams, and "The Shadow Out of Time", in which an Elder Thing is kept as a fellow prisoner.
- Dyer is mentioned in "The Shadow Out of Time" as accompanying Nathaniel Wingate Peaslee's expedition to Australia's Great Sandy Desert.
- The expedition is sponsored by the Nathaniel Derby Pickman Foundation, combining two major names in Lovecraft's fiction: Derby and Pickman. Richard Upton Pickman is the main character in Lovecraft's "Pickman's Model", while Edward Pickman Derby is the protagonist of his "The Thing on the Doorstep", and also one of his literary alter-egos.
- The Elder Things record the coming of Cthulhu to Earth and the sinking of R'lyeh, events referred to in "The Call of Cthulhu" (1928).
- The Elder Things' city is identified with the Plateau of Leng first mentioned in Lovecraft's "Celephaïs" (1920).
- Some members of the expedition have read Miskatonic University's copy of the Necronomicon.
- Dyer mentions "Kadath in the Cold Waste" while referring to a massive mountain range which even the Elder Things "shunned as vaguely and namelessly evil."
- At the very end of the story, Danforth links the horror beyond the forbidden mountain range to Yog-Sothoth and "The Colour Out of Space".
- The Mi-Go are the focus of "The Whisperer in Darkness". Several times throughout, Dyer also makes reference to Albert Wilmarth, the main character of "The Whisperer in Darkness".

== Inspiration ==
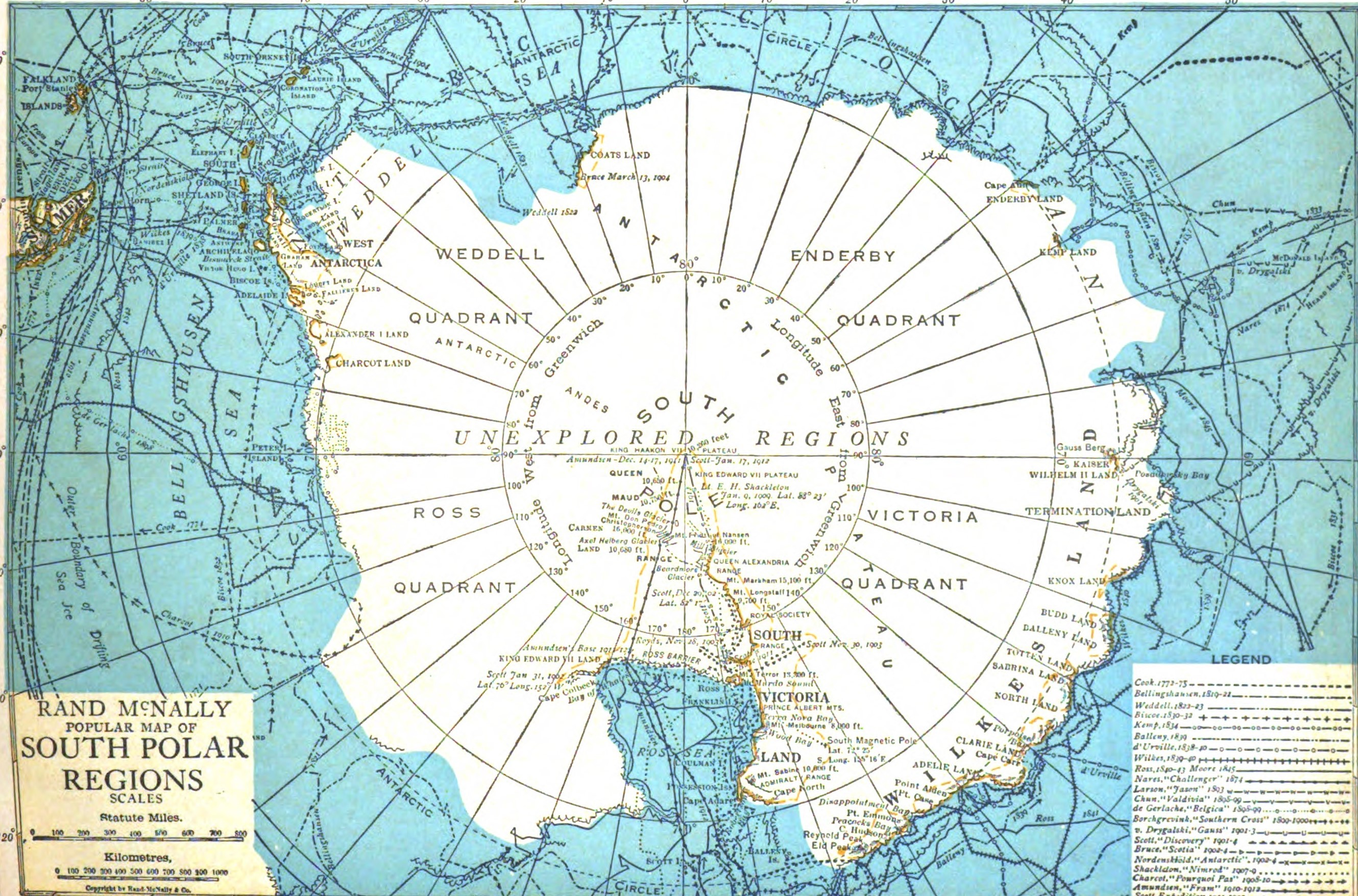
1925 map of Antarctica, with substantial unexplored regions.

Lovecraft had a lifelong interest in Antarctic exploration. "Lovecraft had been fascinated with the Antarctic continent since he was at least 12 years old, when he had written several small treatises on early Antarctic explorers," the biographer S. T. Joshi wrote. At about the age of 9, inspired by W. Clark Russell's 1887 book The Frozen Pirate, Lovecraft had written "several yarns" set in Antarctica.

By the 1920s, Antarctica was "one of the last unexplored regions of the Earth in which large stretches of territory had never seen the tread of human feet. Contemporary maps of the continent show a number of provocative blanks, and Lovecraft could exercise his imagination in filling them in... with little fear of immediate contradiction." However, Lovecraft was basically accurate in presenting the geographic knowledge of Antarctica as it was known at the time, and he referred to continental drift, a theory which was then not widely accepted.

The first expedition of Richard E. Byrd took place between 1928 and 1930, just before the novella was written, and Lovecraft mentioned the explorer repeatedly in his letters and remarked at one point on "geologists of the Byrd expedition having found many fossils indicating a tropical past." In fact, Miskatonic University's expedition was modelled after that of Byrd.

In Lovecraft: A Look Behind the Cthulhu Mythos Lin Carter suggests that one inspiration for At the Mountains of Madness was Lovecraft's own hypersensitivity to cold, as evidenced by an incident in which the writer "collapsed in the street and was carried unconscious into a drug store" because the temperature dropped from 60 degrees to 30 degrees Fahrenheit (15 degrees to -1 degree Celsius). "The loathing and horror that extreme cold evoked in him was carried over into his writing," Carter wrote, "and the pages of Madness convey the blighting, blasting, stifling sensation caused by sub-zero temperatures in a way that even Poe could not suggest."

Joshi further cites Lovecraft's most obvious literary source for At the Mountains of Madness as Edgar Allan Poe's only novel, The Narrative of Arthur Gordon Pym of Nantucket, whose concluding section is set in Antarctica. Lovecraft twice cites Poe's "disturbing and enigmatic" story in his text and explicitly borrows the mysterious cry Tekeli-li or Takkeli from Poe's work. In a letter to August Derleth, Lovecraft wrote that he was trying to achieve with his ending an effect similar to what Poe accomplished in Pym.

Another proposed inspiration for At the Mountains of Madness is Edgar Rice Burroughs's At the Earth's Core (1914), a novel that posits a highly intelligent reptilian race, the Mahar, living in a hollow Earth. "Consider the similarity of Burroughs' Mahar to Lovecraft's Old Ones, both of whom are presented sympathetically despite their ill-treatment of man," wrote the critic William Fulwiler. "[B]oth are winged, web-footed, dominant races; both are scientific scholarly races with a talent for genetics, engineering, and architecture; and both races use men as cattle." Both stories, Fulwiler points out, involve radical new drilling techniques. In both stories, humans are vivisected by nonhuman scientists. Burroughs' Mahar even employ a species of servants known as Sagoths, possibly the source of Lovecraft's Shoggoth.

Other possible sources include A. Merritt's "The People of the Pit," whose description of an underground city in the Yukon bears some resemblance to that of Lovecraft's Elder Things, and Katharine Metcalf Roof's "A Million Years After," a story about dinosaurs hatching from eggs millions of years old that appeared in the November 1930 edition of Weird Tales. In a letter to Frank Belknap Long, Lovecraft declared Metcalf Roof's story to be a "rotten," "cheap," and "puerile" version of an idea he had years earlier, and his dissatisfaction may have provoked him to write his own tale of "the awakening of entities from the dim reaches of Earth's history."

Edward Guimont has argued that At the Mountains of Madness was inspired by contemporary discourse around life on Mars, including Mars-set fictional works and the claims of Martian canals made by Percival Lowell (whom Lovecraft met in 1907). Guimont has also proposed other influences, including contemporary theories about the decline of the Norse Greenlanders and claims of survival of woolly mammoths in Alaska and particularly plot details being inspired by the 1930 discovery of the remains of Andrée's Arctic balloon expedition.

An H.P. Lovecraft Encyclopedia suggests that the long scope of history recounted in the story may have been inspired by Oswald Spengler's The Decline of the West. Some details of the story may also have been taken from M. P. Shiel's 1901 Arctic exploration novel The Purple Cloud, which was republished in 1930.

The title is derived from a line in Lord Dunsany's short story "The Hashish Man": "And we came at last to those ivory hills that are named the Mountains of Madness...".

Lovecraft's own "The Nameless City" (1921), which also deals with the exploration of an ancient underground city that is apparently abandoned by its nonhuman builders, sets a precedent for At the Mountains of Madness. In both stories, the explorers use the nonhumans' artwork to deduce the history of their species. Lovecraft had also used that device in "The Dream-Quest of Unknown Kadath" (1927)

As for details of the Antarctic setting, the author's description of some of the scenery is in part inspired by the Asian paintings of Nicholas Roerich and the illustrations of Gustave Doré, both of whom are referenced by the story's narrator multiple times.

== Publication ==
Cover of Astounding Stories, February 1936.

Lovecraft submitted the story to Weird Tales, but it was rejected by the editor Farnsworth Wright in July 1931. Lovecraft took the rejection badly and put the story to one side for years. It was eventually submitted by Lovecraft's literary agent Julius Schwartz in 1935 to F. Orlin Tremaine, the editor of Astounding Stories.. Tremaine accepted it at once, apparently without reading it.

The novella was serialized in the February, March, and April 1936 issues, and Lovecraft received $315 (equivalent to $7,308 in 2025)—the most he had ever received for a story. The story, however, was harshly edited, probably by a sub-editor working for Tremaine. Lovecraft's British spellings were changed to American ones, and punctuation was altered, Lovecraft's long paragraphing was split up, and the end of the story had several passages amounting to around 1000 words omitted. Lovecraft was outraged and called Tremaine "that god-damn'd dung of a hyaena [sic]". Lovecraft made some corrections by hand to his own copies of Astounding, but in the end left many alterations unchanged. These corrected copies of the relevant three issues formed the basis for the first Arkham House edition, but this text still contained nearly 1500 errors, mostly in spelling and punctuation, but also in the omission of two small passages toward the beginning. A fully restored text (based upon the surviving typescript except for passages where Lovecraft made demonstrable revisions on scientific points) was not published until S. T. Joshi's edition of the Arkham house volume At the Mountains of Madness and Other Novels (corrected 5th printing, 1985).. An annotated version of the tale appears in The Annotated H.P. Lovecraft (1997) and in The Thing on the Doorstep and Other Weird Stories. (2001).

== Reception ==
The novella was received negatively during Lovecraft's lifetime; Lovecraft stated that its hostile reception had done "more than anything to end [his] effective fictional career." Theodore Sturgeon described the novella as "perfect Lovecraft" and "a good deal more lucid than much of the master's work", as well as "first-water, true-blue science fiction." The story popularized ancient astronaut theories, as well as Antarctica's place in the "ancient astronaut mythology". Edward Guimont has argued that At the Mountains of Madness, despite its terrestrial setting, helped influence later hard science fiction depictions of planetary expeditions and the Big Dumb Object trope, particularly those of Arthur C. Clarke, whose 1940 parody "At the Mountains of Murkiness" was one of his first works of fiction.

== Adaptations ==
- At the Mountains of Madness was adapted into a graphic novel created by I. N. J. Culbard and published in 2010 by SelfMadeHero as part of their Eye Classics line (ISBN 9781906838126). The book was named The Observer Graphic Novel of the Month.
- Japanese artist Gou Tanabe created a two-volume graphic novel with the same name, translated into English by Dark Horse Manga in 2019.
- The Mountains of Madness is an audiovisual musical adaptation of the works of H. P. Lovecraft by Tiger Lillies, Danielle de Picciotto and Alexander Hacke.
- On July 28, 2010, director Guillermo del Toro announced that he would direct a film adaptation of H. P. Lovecraft's At the Mountains of Madness for Universal Pictures, with James Cameron producing. Cameron suggested casting Tom Cruise in the lead role and releasing the film in 3-D. On October 28, 2010, del Toro said that the adaptation probably would not happen at all. He stated, "It doesn't look like I can do it. It's very difficult for the studios to take the step of doing a period-set, R-rated, tentpole movie with a tough ending and no love story. Lovecraft has a readership as big as any best-seller, but it's tough to quantify because his works are in the public domain." Cameron and del Toro put forward the idea to Universal, who greenlit it. In 2012, del Toro posted that, due to the resemblance in premise with the Ridley Scott film Prometheus, the project would probably face a "long pause—if not demise." In 2021 del Toro announced that he was again revisiting the concept and revising the script for an animation approach, saying, "... it would be ideal to do Mountains of Madness as stop-motion." However, in 2025, del Toro once again indicated that the movie was no longer happening, following the release of Frankenstein.

== Unofficial sequels and other inspired works ==
- David A. McIntee noted similarities between the first half of the 1979 science fiction horror film Alien, particularly in early versions of the script, to At the Mountains of Madness, "not in storyline, but in dread-building mystery", and calls the finished film "the best Lovecraftian movie ever made, without being a Lovecraft adaptation", due to its similarities in tone and atmosphere to Lovecraft's works. In 2009, Alien writer Dan O'Bannon said the film was "strongly influenced, tone-wise, by Lovecraft, and one of the things it proved is that you can't adapt Lovecraft effectively without an extremely strong visual style ... What you need is a cinematic equivalent of Lovecraft's prose." The 2004 Alien sequel, Alien vs. Predator borrows its plot liberally from At the Mountains of Madness.
- The 1995 Prisoner of Ice video game by Infogrames Multimedia is loosely based on At The Mountains of Madness, particularly the introduction where it involves a group of people discovering two mysterious cargo crates in Antarctica that contain Lovecraftian creatures called "the Prisoners."
- Chaosium Games released a campaign book titled Beyond the Mountains of Madness for their Call of Cthulhu role-playing game in 1999. This book details the Starkweather-Moore expedition return to the ice to discover the truth about the Miskatonic Expedition. The book incorporates many of the aspects of the original Lovecraft story, including references to the Poe story, The Narrative of Arthur Gordon Pym of Nantucket, Nicholas Roerich, Danforth and Dyer. This book won the Origins Award for "Best Role-Playing Adventure" in 2000.
- Call of Cthulhu: Beyond the Mountains of Madness was a cancelled video game adaptation by Headfirst Productions. It was announced in 2002 as a planned sequel to then-upcoming Call of Cthulhu: Dark Corners of the Earth (a long-delayed video game based on Lovecraft's The Shadow over Innsmouth, eventually released in 2006).
- Charles Stross' 2000 novelette "A Colder War" is a direct sequel to Lovecraft's story. Set in the 1980s, it presents an alternate history of the Cold War where the threat of mutual annihilation is not nuclear, but occult, the US and USSR being locked in an arms race based on technologies found by subsequent expeditions to the alien city.
- Edge of Nowhere, a 2016 video game developed by Insomniac Games, is set in 1952, 20 years after the expedition, and involves Victor Howard (Robin Atkin Downes) as he ventures into the site to locate his fiancée, who was on an expedition down a similar path.
- Penguin Colony, a 2026 video game developed by Origame Digital, is inspired by the novella.

== See also ==
- In the Mouth of Madness - a horror film directed by John Carpenter, influenced by Lovecraft
- Who Goes There? - a 1938 science fiction-horror novella by John W. Campbell, also Antarctica-based

== Sources ==
- Lovecraft, Howard P. (2005) [1936]. "At the Mountains of Madness". At the Mountains of Madness: The Definitive Edition. New York: The Modern Library. ISBN 0-8129-7441-7.
- Manhire, Bill (2004). The Wide White Page: Writers Imagine Antarctica. Victoria University Press. ISBN 0-86473-485-9.
- McIntee, David (2005). Beautiful Monsters: The Unofficial and Unauthorized Guide to the Alien and Predator Films. Surrey: Telos Publishing. ISBN 1-903889-94-4.
- Guimont, Edward; Smith, Horace A. (2023). When the Stars Are Right: H. P. Lovecraft and Astronomy (First ed.). New York City: Hippocampus Press. ISBN 9781614984078.
- Joshi, S. T. (1996). A Subtler Magick: The Writings and Philosophy of H.P. Lovecraft. Wildside Press LLC. ISBN 978-1-880448-61-8.
- Guimont, Edward (August 2020). "An Arctic Mystery: The Lovecraftian North Pole". Lovecraft Annual (14): 138–165. ISSN 1935-6102. JSTOR 26939814.
- Bleiler, E. F. (1999). "H. P. Lovecraft". In Bleiler, Richard (ed.). Science Fiction Writers: Critical Studies of the Major Authors from the Early Nineteenth Century to the Present Day. Charles Scribner's Sons. p. 479. ISBN 0684805936.
- Carter, Lin (1993). Lovecraft: A Look Behind the Cthulhu Mythos. San Bernardino, Calif.: Borgo Press. ISBN 1557422532.
- Lovecraft, Howard Phillips (1971). August Derleth, Donald Wandrei (ed.). 1929-1931. Selected Letters. Vol. III. Sauk City: Arkam House. ISBN 0870540327.
- Pearsall, Anthony B. (2005). The Lovecraft Lexicon (1st ed.). Tempe: New Falcon. ISBN 1-56184-129-3.
- Colavito, Jason. "The Cthulhu Comparison". Archived from the original on May 13, 2006.
- Joshi, S. T.; Schultz, David E. (2001). An H. P. Lovecraft Encyclopedia. Greenwood Publishing Group. ISBN 9780313315787 – via Google Books.
- Joshi, S. T. (2001). A Dreamer and a Visionary: H.P. Lovecraft in His Time. Liverpool University Press. ISBN 0-85323-946-0.
