= Nyarlathotep (short story) =

- Short story by H. P. Lovecraft
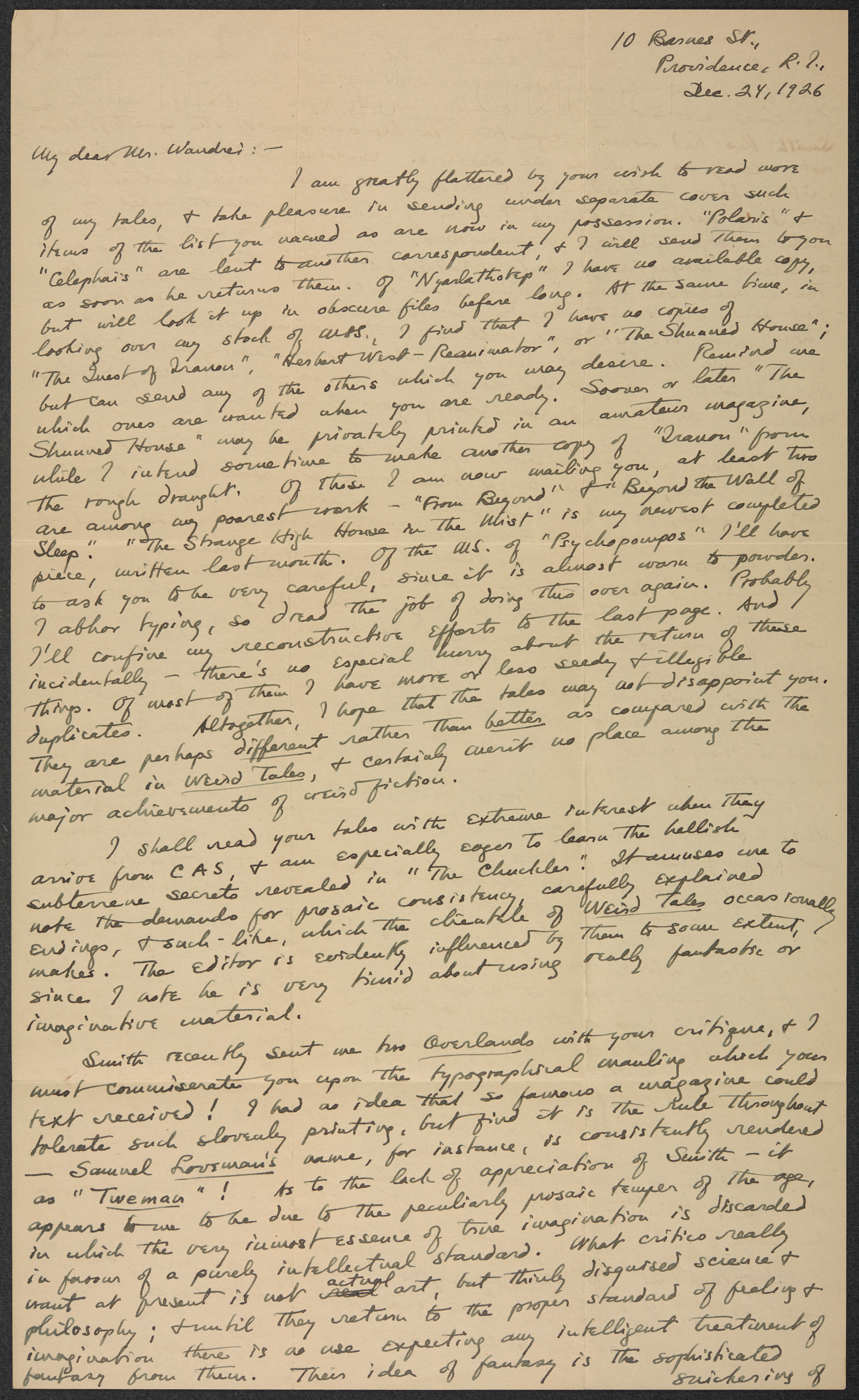
- Nyarlathotep

Text available at Wikisource
- Country: United States
- Language: English

Publication
- Published in: The United Amateur
- Publication type: Periodical
- Media type: Print (magazine)
- Publication date: November 1920

"Nyarlathotep" is a weird fiction prose poem by H. P. Lovecraft. It was written in 1920 and first saw publication in that year's November issue of The United Amateur. The poem itself is a bleak view of human civilization in decline, and it explores the mixed sensations of desperation and defiance in a dying society.

== Background ==
"Nyarlathotep" was based on one of Lovecraft's dreams. The first body paragraph of the poem was written "while he was still half-asleep". The poem, which stands as the first appearance of the titular Cthulhu Mythos entity Nyarlathotep, was described by Lovecraft as "a nightmare". In the inspiring dream, Lovecraft read a letter from his friend Samuel Loveman that contained an invitation, which is as follows:

Don’t fail to see Nyarlathotep if he comes to Providence. He is horrible—horrible beyond anything you can imagine—but wonderful. He haunts one for hours afterward. I am still shuddering at what he showed.

== Plot ==
The story is written in first person and begins by describing a strange and inexplicable sense of foreboding experienced by humanity in general, in anticipation of a great unknown evil.

The story proceeds to describe the appearance in Egypt of Nyarlathotep, "of the old native blood" and resembling a Pharaoh, who claims to have "risen up out of the blackness of twenty-seven centuries," and to be receiving messages from other worlds. Coming to the West, he appears to have a profound command of the sciences, constructs marvelous and unfathomable devices, and gains great fame as he travels from city to city demonstrating his inventions and powers. Wherever Nyarlathotep goes, the inhabitants' sleep is plagued by vivid nightmares.

The story describes Nyarlathotep's arrival in the narrator's city, and the narrator's attendance at one of Nyarlathotep's demonstrations, in which he defiantly dismisses Nyarlathotep's displays of power as mere tricks. The party of observers is driven out of the hall by Nyarlathotep, and hysterically insists to one another that they are not afraid, and that the city around them is unchanged and alive, even as the electric street lights begin to fail. Everyone falls into a trancelike state and wanders off, dividing into at least three columnal groups: the first of these disappears around a corner, from which there is then heard an echoing moan; another descends into a subway station with the sound of mad laughter; the third group, which contains the narrator, travels outward from the city toward the country. The narrator's party marches through unseasonable snows into a dark rift, with the narrator the last to enter.

The story ends by describing a series of horrific, surreal vistas experienced by the narrator, in which chaos and insanity pervade an ancient, dying universe ruled by mindless, inhuman gods, whose messenger and "soul" is Nyarlathotep.

== In other media ==
- In the 2007 Dream Theater song "The Dark Eternal Night," lyricist John Petrucci introduces a character similar to Nyarlathotep and quotes phrases from Lovecraft's story.
