= The Shadow Out of Time =

1936 novella by H.P. Lovecraft

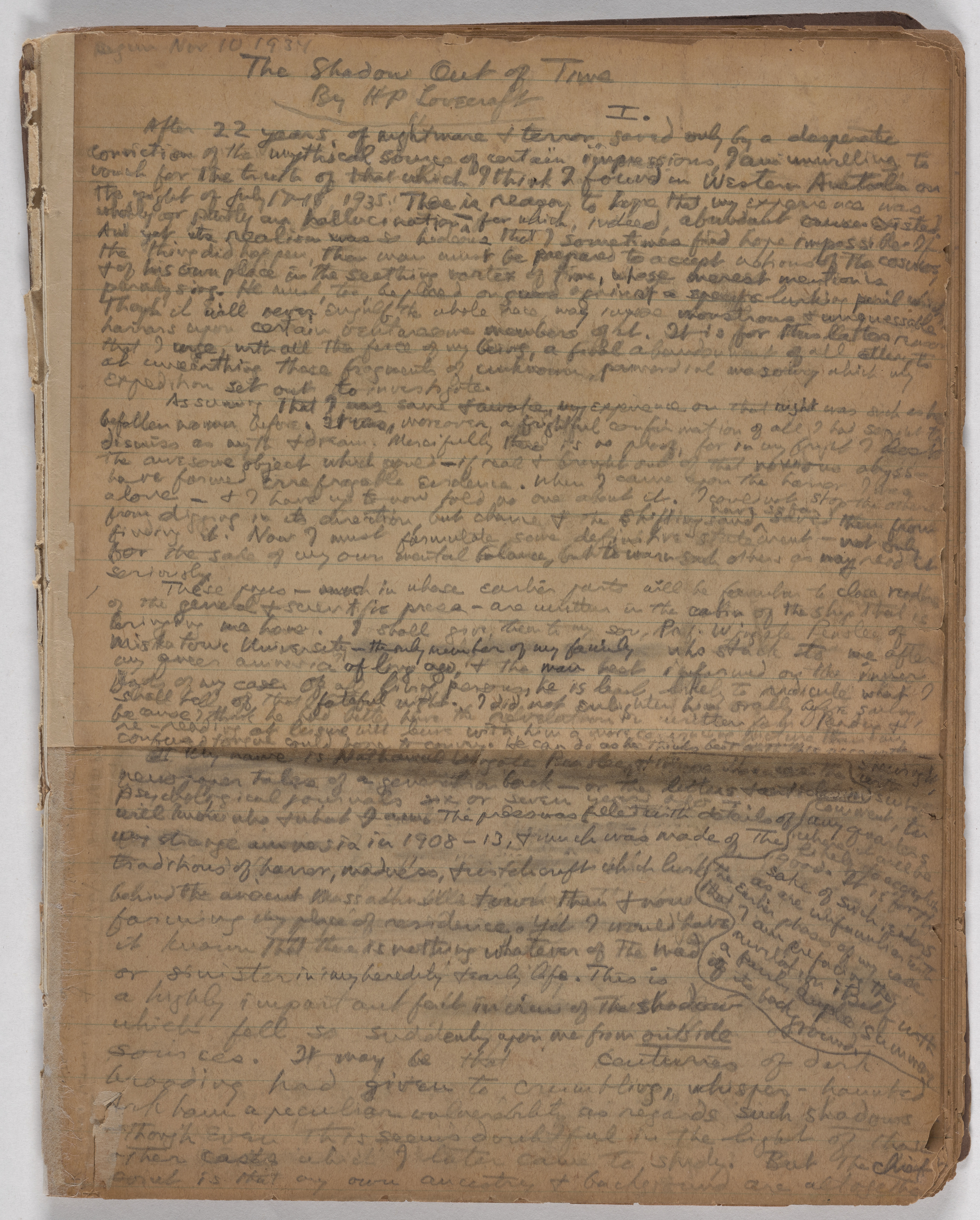
- Author: H. P. Lovecraft
- Cover artist: Howard V. Brown
- Language: English
- Genre: Horror, science fiction
- Publication date: June 1936
- Publication place: United States
- Media type: Print (Magazine)

The Shadow Out of Time is a novella by American horror fiction writer H. P. Lovecraft. Written between November 1934 and February 1935, it was first published in the June 1936 issue of Astounding Stories. The story describes time and space travel by mind transfer, where a person in a given place and time can switch bodies with someone who is elsewhere or elsewhen. As with other Lovecraftian works, this story features otherworldly alien beings that are not simply variations on humans or other familiar terrestrial animals.

== Plot ==
Nathaniel Wingate Peaslee, professor of economics at Miskatonic University, recounts in flashbacks the events that occurred between May 14, 1908 and July 17–18, 1935. During a lesson on May 14, 1908 at around 10:20 a.m., he falls into a coma that lasts several days. After he wakes up, he no longer seems to be himself. His family turns away from him, and only his youngest son Wingate Peaslee is convinced that his real father will return one day. In the years that follow, the professor's secondary personality embarks on extensive expeditions to known and unknown places all over the world. He also seems to want to acquire as much knowledge as possible. After his original personality reappears in September 1913, he and his son try to find out what has happened to him. At first, Peaslee assumes that the events and the nightmares and “quasi-memories” that have haunted him since then are the result of a mental illness. But with the beginning of the First World War, his mental state deteriorates. His initial relief that everything could just be a delusion fades when he realizes that there are other cases like his in history that are eerily similar. The professor eventually succeeds in uncovering more and more memories until he finally remembers exactly what seems to have happened to him.

He was the victim of a body replacement by alien beings who called themselves the Great Race of Yith. They had come to Earth 200 million years ago and possessed the ability to swap their minds with those of another being, both in the past and in the future. They use this ability to create vast libraries of all the knowledge of what has ever been known or will ever be known on Earth. In order to achieve this goal, they transfer their spirit to the respective epoch from which they wish to acquire knowledge, into the body of a suitable person. During this time, the spirit whose body is taken over is in the body of the being who has carried out this exchange.

The captives are treated kindly and can move around freely. They are also encouraged to write down their knowledge, giving them free access to the libraries of the great race. After learning everything they want to know, a reverse process is set in motion and the captured spirit returns to their body with no memory of what happened. This is done to protect the timeline and the person undergoing the exchange, as the Yith realized after some experimentation that sending a spirit back to its time with the knowledge it was able to learn in the Yith libraries has negative consequences. Gradually, more details about the Great Race come to light. It turns out that the Great Race died out eons ago because their civilization was destroyed by a rival, aggressive race described as “flying polyps” and they transferred only their brightest minds into the bodies of a race of beetles that will colonize Earth after humanity.

Peaslee receives a letter informing him that excavations have been carried out in the great sandy desert of Australia that correspond to what he has written in various articles. The professor and his son then set off for Australia. During a night-time walk, he finally finds the ruins of the abandoned city. After making out an underground entrance to a half-preserved part of the ruins, he descends and recognizes the corridors and rooms from his memories. Torn between the desire to escape and a feverish mixture of burning curiosity and impulsive surrender to fate, he descends deeper into the familiar ruins. As he feels his way further and further down, he notices that the trapdoors under which the flying polyps were imprisoned are open.

He heads for the central archive, where he hopes to find proof of his memories. He finds a metal case and is horrified to discover what he finds inside it, and is convinced that it is certain proof. However, on his way out through the corridors, he accidentally makes a loud noise that wakes someone – or something – up, and in his panic to escape, he loses the case. After reaching the surface, he returns to the expedition camp at dawn. Since his only evidence has disappeared, he can no longer say for sure whether it was all just a dream or real. When, to his relief, nothing can be found at the place where Peaslee had been, he sets off for home with his son. The story ends with Peaslee revealing to the reader that the evidence inside the lost case was a book and that this book was written in his own handwriting.

== Characters ==
- Nathaniel Wingate Peaslee: The narrator of the story, a professor of political economy at Miskatonic University, and, from 1908 until 1913, a victim of the Great Race of Yith. He was born c. 1870. (Note: There are autobiographical aspects to the character. The years of Peaslee's amnesia correspond to the timespan of Lovecraft's adolescent nervous breakdown, which forced him to drop out of high school and withdraw from society. During this period, Lovecraft suffered from facial tics, which may be reflected in the Yithian-possessed Peaslee's inability to control his facial muscles. The feeling Lovecraft described, upon returning to Providence after living in New York City for two years, that he was "awakening from the queer dream about being away from home" has been called "the cornerstone upon which Lovecraft built his masterpiece, 'The Shadow out of Time'." But An H. P. Lovecraft Encyclopedia, which calls Peaslee perhaps "the most thoroughly developed of HPL's characters", notes that there are parallels as well to Lovecraft's father, Winfield Scott Lovecraft, who also displayed eccentric behavior during a five-year period of madness.)
- Wingate Peaslee: Son of Nathaniel Peaslee, also a Miskatonic professor.
- William Dyer: A Miskatonic University geology professor who accompanies the expedition to Australia. Previously appeared as the protagonist of At the Mountains of Madness.
- Titus Sempronius Blaesus: A Roman "who had been a quaestor in Sulla's time".
- Bartolomeo Corsi: A "12th century Florentine monk".
- Crom-Ya: A Cimmerian chief who lived c. 15,000 B.C.
- Khephnes: "An Egyptian of the 14th Dynasty, who told me the hideous secret of Nyarlathotep".
- Nevil Kingston-Brown: An "Australian physicist...who will die in 2518 A.D."
- Pierre-Louis Montagny: "An aged Frenchman of Louis XIII's time".
- Nug-Soth: "A magician of the dark conquerors of 16,000 A.D."
- S'gg'ha: A being from "the Star-headed vegetable carnivores of Antarctica."
- Theodotides: A Greco-Bactrian official of 200 B.C.
- James Woodville: "A Suffolk gentleman of Cromwell's day".
- Yiang-Li: "A philosopher from the cruel empire of Tsan-Chan, which is to come in 5,000 A.D."

== Inspiration ==
S. T. Joshi points to Berkeley Square, a 1933 fantasy film, as an inspiration for The Shadow Out of Time: "Lovecraft saw this film four times in late 1933; its portrayal of a man of the 20th century who somehow merges his personality with that of his 18th-century ancestor was clearly something that fired Lovecraft's imagination, since he had written a story on this very theme himself—the then unpublished The Case of Charles Dexter Ward (1927)." Lovecraft called the film "the most weirdly perfect embodiment of my own moods and pseudo-memories that I have ever seen—for all my life I have felt as if I might wake up out of this dream of an idiotic Victorian age and insane jazz age into the sane reality of 1760 or 1770 or 1780." Lovecraft noted some conceptual problems in Berkeley Square's depiction of time travel, and felt that he had resolved these flaws in his novella. Other literary models for The Shadow Out of Time include H. B. Drake's The Shadowy Thing (originally published as The Remedy in 1925), about a person who has the ability to transfer his personality to another body; Henri Beraud's Lazarus (1925), in which the protagonist develops an alter ego during a lengthy period of amnesia; and Walter de la Mare's The Return (1910), featuring a character who seems to be possessed by a mind from the 18th century.

== Reception ==
Lovecraft critic Lin Carter calls The Shadow Out of Time Lovecraft's "single greatest achievement in fiction", citing "its amazing scope and sense of cosmic immensitude, the gulfs of time it opens, [and] the titanic sweep of the narrative", while Swedish Lovecraft expert Martin Andersson named the story as one of his four favorites and called it Lovecraft's "magnum opus". Lovecraft himself was dissatisfied with the effort, so much so that he mailed the original manuscript to August Derleth without taking a copy for himself. Cinescape Magazine rated the story to be one of the top 10 Science Fiction and Fantasy Books of 2001. Mark Squirek wrote in the New York Journal of Books that, "The complexity of Mr. Lovecraft’s story is enhanced by the art showcasing what he wrote—a great way for a novice reader to discover the work of H. P. Lovecraft." Also, Publishers Weekly wrote, "Lovecraftians will hail the publication of H.P. Lovecraft's The Shadow Out of Time." Edward Guimont and Horace A. Smith argue that, along with At the Mountains of Madness, The Shadow Out of Time helped originate the science fiction trope of the Big Dumb Object.

== Adaptations ==
- The H. P. Lovecraft Historical Society has produced Dark Adventure Radio Theatre: The Shadow Out of Time, a Dark Adventure Radio Theatre adaptation of the story, similar to their previous adaptations (Dark Adventure Radio Theatre: At the Mountains of Madness and Dark Adventure Radio Theatre: The Dunwich Horror).
- The Shadow Out of Time was adapted by artist Larry Todd as "The Shadow From the Abyss" in Skull Comics No. 5 (Last Gasp, 1972).
- The Shadow Out of Time was adapted by cartoonist Matt Howarth in the book Graphic Classics: H.P. Lovecraft (Graphic Classics, Volume 4) and is included in both the first (2002) and second (2007) editions.
- The Shadow Out of Time was adapted by cartoonist I. N. J. Culbard in a graphic novel of the same title, published in 2013.
- The protagonist of the 2006 video game Call of Cthulhu: Dark Corners of the Earth is revealed to have been sired by a Yithian who mind-swapped with his father.
- Manga artist Gou Tanabe has adapted several of H.P. Lovecraft's stories into graphic novels, including The Shadow Out of Time.
- The Identity V character Ivy "The Shadow" Lawson takes heavy inspiration from The Shadow Out of Time for her backstory and gameplay, being a woman who seemingly fused with a Yithian after what are implied to have been several instances of mind-swapping.
- Out of the Blue Games' 2026 video game Call of the Elder Gods is largely inspired by The Shadow Out of Time. The Yithians and remnants of their civilisation appear, and one of the protagonists has "lost time" and dreams of a prehistoric city. The game is a sequel to the 2020 game Call of the Sea, also inspired by the works of Lovecraft.
