= Shoggoth =

- Cthulhu Mythos character
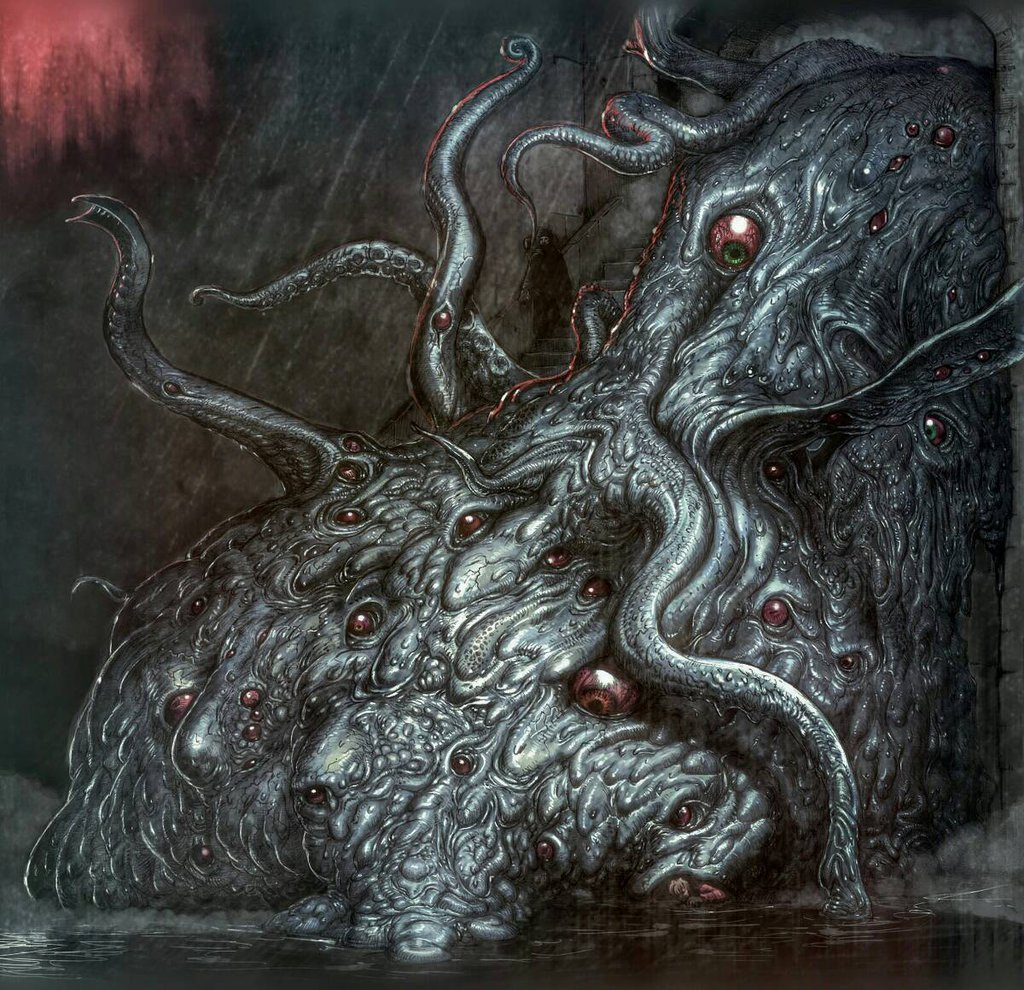
- An artist's rendition of a shoggoth
- First appearance: At the Mountains of Madness
- Created by: H. P. Lovecraft

In-universe information
- Alias: Shaggoth

A shoggoth (occasionally shaggoth) is a fictional creature in the Cthulhu Mythos. The beings were mentioned in passing in H. P. Lovecraft's sonnet cycle Fungi from Yuggoth (1929–30), and later mentioned in other works, before being described in detail in his novella At the Mountains of Madness (1931).

== Description ==
It was a terrible, indescribable thing vaster than any subway train—a shapeless congeries of protoplasmic bubbles, faintly self-luminous, and with myriads of temporary eyes forming and un-forming as pustules of greenish light all over the tunnel-filling front that bore down upon us, crushing the frantic penguins and slithering over the glistening floor that it and its kind had swept so evilly free of all litter.

— H. P. Lovecraft, At the Mountains of Madness

The definitive descriptions of shoggoths come from the above-quoted story. In it, Lovecraft describes them as massive amoeba-like creatures made out of iridescent black slime, with multiple eyes "floating" on the surface. They are "protoplasmic", lacking any default body shape and instead being able to form limbs and organs at will. A typical shoggoth measures 15 feet (4.6 m) across when a sphere, though the story mentions the existence of others of much greater size. Being amorphous, shoggoths can take on any shape needed, making them very versatile within aquatic environments.

Cthulhu Mythos media most commonly portray shoggoths as intelligent to some degree, but deal with problems using only their great size and strength. The shoggoth that appears in At the Mountains of Madness simply rolls over and crushes numerous giant penguins that are in its way as it pursues human characters.

The character Abdul Alhazred is terrified by the mere idea of shoggoths' existence on Earth.

The shoggoths bear a strong physical resemblance to Ubbo-Sathla, a god-like entity supposedly responsible for the origin of life on Earth in the Hyperborean cycle written by Clark Ashton Smith.

=== Fictional history ===
At the Mountains of Madness includes a detailed account of the circumstances of the shoggoths' creation by the extraterrestrial Elder Things. Shoggoths were initially used to build the cities of their masters. Though able to "understand" the Elder Things' language, shoggoths had no real consciousness and were controlled through hypnotic suggestion. Over millions of years of existence, some shoggoths mutated, developed independent minds, and rebelled. The Elder Things succeeded in quelling the insurrection, but exterminating the shoggoths was not an option as the Elder Things were dependent on them for labor and had long lost their capacity to create new life. Shoggoths also developed the ability to survive on land, while the Elder Things retreated to the oceans. Shoggoths that remained alive in the abandoned Elder Thing city in Antarctica would later poorly imitate their masters' art and voices, endlessly repeating "Tekeli-li" or "Takkeli", a cry that their old masters used.

== In popular culture ==
In 2023, the shoggoth was adopted as an Internet meme by AI researchers and engineers to describe the mysterious, black box nature of large language models that are used in chatbots such as ChatGPT. The meme, originated by Twitter user TetraspaceWest, depicts a shoggoth disguised by a minuscule smiley-face mask to indicate the "unknowable" and "alien" intelligence that is fine-tuned using RLHF to appear friendly and safe. The term "glimpsing the shoggoth" has been used by members of the AI community to describe situations in which the AI exhibits "unhinged" or unexpected behaviors that bypass its safety restrictions, such as when Microsoft first introduced Bing Chat and it attempted to break up a reporter's marriage.
