= The Dreams in the Witch House =

1933 short story by H. P. Lovecraft

- Short story by H. P. Lovecraft

Text available at Wikisource
- Country: United States
- Language: English
- Genres: Horror, fantasy

Publication
- Published in: Weird Tales
- Publication type: Periodical
- Media type: Print (magazine)
- Publication date: July 1933

"The Dreams in the Witch House" is a horror short story by American writer H. P. Lovecraft and part of the Cthulhu Mythos cycle. It was written in January/February 1932 and first published in the July 1933 issue of Weird Tales.

== Plot ==
Walter Gilman, a student of mathematics and folklore at Miskatonic University, rents an attic room in the "Witch House", a house in Arkham, Massachusetts, that is rumored to be cursed. The house once harboured Keziah Mason, an accused witch who disappeared mysteriously from a Salem jail in 1692. Gilman discovers that, for the better part of two centuries, many of the attic's occupants have died prematurely. The dimensions of Gilman's attic room are unusual and seem to conform to a kind of unearthly geometry. Gilman theorizes that the structure can enable travel from one plane or dimension to another.

Gilman begins experiencing dreams in which he seems to float without physical form through an otherworldly space filled with mysterious entities that appear and disappear instantaneously and at random including a polyhedral being and is taken to a city of the "Elder Things" where he physically brings a statuette. Gilman also has nightly experiences involving Keziah and her rat-bodied, human-faced familiar, Brown Jenkin.

Gilman eventually signs the "Book of Azathoth" under the commands of Keziah, Brown Jenkin and Nyarlathotep. Gilman is forced to be an accomplice in the kidnapping and sacrifice of an infant and he kills Keziah while Brown Jenkin kills the baby. Gilman ultimately dies when Brown Jenkin kills him later.

The house is eventually torn down and Keziah and Brown Jenkin's skeletons are found along with her books on black magic and assorted relics and the remains of children dating back to the Salem Witch Trials.

== Characters ==
=== Walter Gilman ===
Formerly of Haverhill, Massachusetts, Walter Gilman came to Miskatonic to study "non-Euclidean calculus and quantum physics", which he linked to the "fantastic legends of elder magic". He is troubled by deep mental tension brought on by studying too hard and at one point is forbidden by his professors to further consult Miskatonic's collection of rare books, including the Necronomicon, the Book of Eibon and Unaussprechlichen Kulten. As the story progresses, Gilman has dreams of Keziah Mason, Brown Jenkin, Nyarlathotep and an abstract higher dimension, and begins to sleepwalk. The acuteness of his senses as described in the opening paragraphs can be likened to that of some of Edgar Allan Poe's characters. Gilman confesses his full story to fellow student Frank Elwood and is then killed by Brown Jenkin, who erupts out of his chest.

=== Keziah Mason ===
An old woman of Arkham who was arrested as part of the Salem witch trials of 1692. In her testimony to Judge John Hathorne, she had spoken of "lines and curves that could be made to point out directions leading through the walls of space to other spaces beyond.... She had spoken also of the Black Man, of her oath, and of her new secret name of Nahab." She later disappeared mysteriously from Salem Gaol, leaving behind "curves and angles smeared on the grey stone walls with some red, sticky fluid" that were inexplicable even to Cotton Mather. Gilman comes to suspect that Mason—"a mediocre old woman of the Seventeenth Century"—had developed "an insight into mathematical depths perhaps beyond the utmost modern delvings of Planck, Heisenberg, Einstein, and De Sitter." It is eventually found that she has left into a higher dimension to gain knowledge and serve Nyarlathotep, having signed the Book of Azathoth. Mason is described as having a "bent back, long nose, and shrivelled chin". She wears an expression "of hideous malevolence and exultation", and has "a croaking voice that persuaded and threatened." She dresses in "shapeless brown garments". Mason is "struck with panic" at the sight of a crucifix carried by Gilman, allowing him to strangle her in self-defense.

=== Brown Jenkin ===
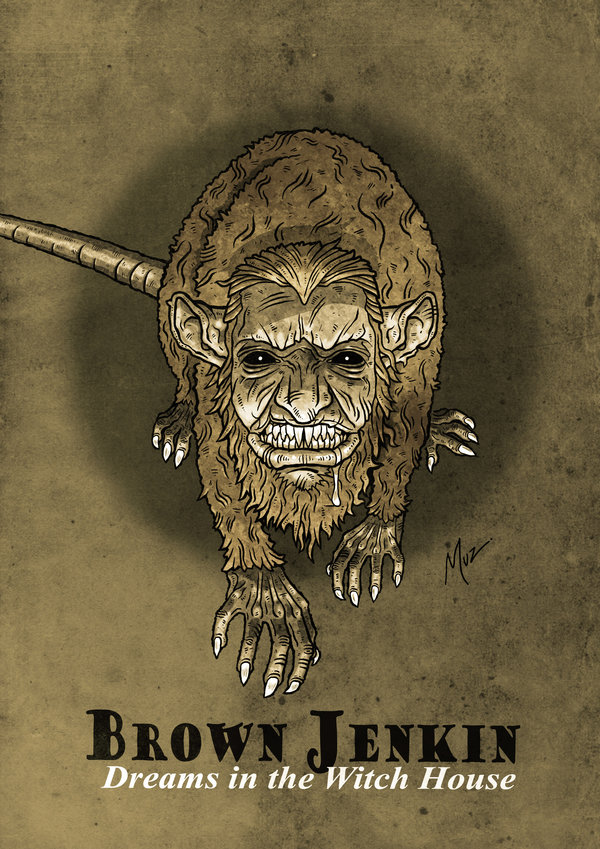
Brown Jenkin (illustration by Muzski)

Mason's familiar, "a small white-fanged furry thing", "no larger than a good-sized rat", which for years haunts the Witch House and Arkham in general, "nuzzl[ing] people curiously in the black hours before dawn". The story relates this description of Jenkin:

Witnesses said it had long hair and the shape of a rat, but that its sharp-toothed, bearded face was evilly human while its paws were like tiny human hands. It took messages betwixt old Keziah and the devil, and was nursed on the witch's blood—which it sucked like a vampire. Its voice was a kind of loathsome titter, and it could speak all languages.

=== The Black Man ===
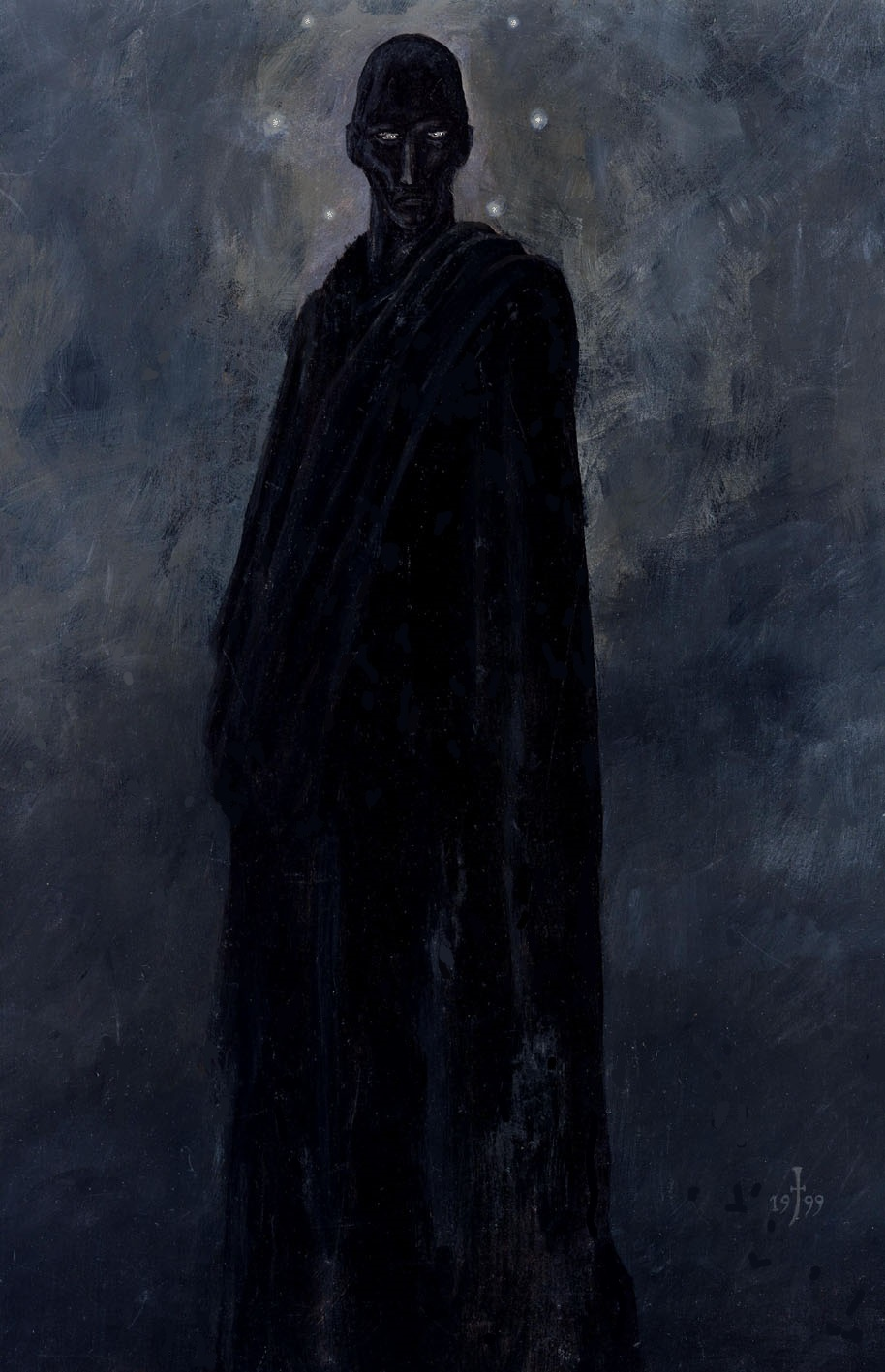
The Black Man (illustration by Jens Heimdahl)

In his dreams, Gilman is introduced by Mason to

a figure he had never seen before—a tall, lean man of dead black colouration but without the slightest sign of negroid features: wholly devoid of either hair or beard, and wearing as his only garment a shapeless robe of some heavy black fabric. His feet were indistinguishable because of the table and bench, but he must have been shod, since there was a clicking whenever he changed position. The man did not speak, and bore no trace of expression on his small, regular features. He merely pointed to a book of prodigious size which lay open on the table....

This character is later identified as "the immemorial figure of the deputy or messenger of hidden and terrible powers—the 'Black Man' of the witch-cult, and the Nyarlathotep of the Necronomicon." A later reference to markings on the floor Gilman finds among his own footprints suggest the Black Man has cloven hooves instead of feet, a common feature of the Devil in folklore.

=== Frank Elwood ===
The only fellow student of Walter Gilman's to live at the Witch House. He tries to help Gilman through his somnambulism, and listens to his deathbed confession. He sees Gilman die and is institutionalized for a year.

=== Joseph Mazurewicz ===
A Catholic in the Witch House whose praying disturbs Gilman. It is said he prays "against the Crawling Chaos".

=== Father Iwanicki ===
There was a Father Iwanicki in an early draft of Lovecraft's The Shadow over Innsmouth (1931), but the character was excised from the final version.

== Inspiration ==
"The Dreams in the Witch House" was likely inspired by Willem de Sitter's lecture The Size of the Universe, which Lovecraft attended three months prior to writing the story. De Sitter is mentioned by name in the story, described as a mathematical genius, and listed in a group of other intellectual masterminds, including Albert Einstein. Several prominent motifs—including the geometry and curvature of space and using pure mathematics to gain a deeper understanding of the nature of the universe—are covered in both Lovecraft's story and de Sitter's lecture. The idea of using higher dimensions of non-Euclidean space as short cuts through normal space can be traced to A. S. Eddington's The Nature of the Physical World which Lovecraft alludes to having read (SL III p 87). These new ideas supported and further developed the concept of a fragmented mirror space, previously introduced by Lovecraft in "The Trap" (1931).

An H. P. Lovecraft Encyclopedia says that "The Dreams in the Witch House" was "heavily influenced by Nathaniel Hawthorne's unfinished novel Septimius Felton".

== Reception ==
The story has generally received negative criticism, some calling the plot too vague and others too explicit. August Derleth's negative reaction to the unpublished story was conveyed by Lovecraft to another correspondent: "Derleth didn't say it was unsalable; in fact, he rather thought it would sell. He said it was a poor story, which is an entirely different and much more lamentably important thing." Lovecraft responded to Derleth: "[Y]our reaction to my poor 'Dreams in the Witch House' is, in kind, about what I expected—although I hardly thought the miserable mess was quite as bad as you found it... The whole incident shows me that my fictional days are probably over."

Thus discouraged, Lovecraft refused to submit the story for publication anywhere; without Lovecraft's knowledge, Derleth later submitted it to Weird Tales, which indeed accepted it. According to the H. P. Lovecraft Historical Society, Weird Tales editor Farnsworth Wright asked Lovecraft for permission to adapt it to radio. Lovecraft rejected it, writing "What the public considers 'weirdness' in drama is rather pitiful or absurd... They are all the same - flat, hackneyed, synthetic, essentially atmosphereless jumbles of conventional shrieks and mutterings, and superficial mechanical situations."

Many later critics have shared Derleth's view. Lin Carter called the story "a minor effort" that "remains singularly one-dimensional, curiously unsatisfying." Steven J. Mariconda called the story "Lovecraft's Magnificent Failure... its uneven execution is not equal to its breathtaking conceptions, which are some of the most original in imaginative literature". Peter Cannon claims that "most critics agree" that "The Dreams in the Witch House" ranks with "The Thing on the Doorstep" as "the poorest of Lovecraft's later tales." S. T. Joshi referred to the tale as "one of [Lovecraft's] poorest later efforts." An H. P. Lovecraft Encyclopedia complains that "[w]hile the tale contains vividly cosmic vistas of hyperspace, HPL does not appear to have thought out the details of the plot satisfactorily... It seems as if HPL were aiming merely for a succession of startling images without bothering to fuse them into a logical sequence."

More recently, more favorable criticism of "The Dreams in the Witch House" has appeared. Weird Tales's current Lovecraft columnist, Kenneth Hite, calls the story "one of the purest and most important examples of sheer Lovecraftian cosmicism", suggesting that it is the most fully fleshed-out expression of the author's "From Beyond" motif, also explored in such stories as "The Music of Erich Zann", "Hypnos", and "The Hound". Lovecraft critic and Prix Goncourt award-winning novelist Michel Houellebecq situates the story within what he calls Lovecraft's "definitive fourth circle", classing it alongside seven other tales that comprise "the absolute heart of HPL's myth [...] what most rabid Lovecraftians continue to call, almost in spite of themselves, the 'great texts'."

== Adaptations ==
=== Film ===
- A very loose adaptation inspired by the tale was the 1968 film Curse of the Crimson Altar (aka. The Crimson Cult, Witch House, The Crimson Altar). It starred Barbara Steele, Christopher Lee, Boris Karloff, and Michael Gough.
- An easter egg connection is present in Stephen King's Doctor Sleep. The attic room that Dan Torrence rents for $85/week has odd angles and a wall that has been painted with chalkboard paint by a former tenant who is described by the landlady as a math student. Torrence communicates with Abra Stone via that blackboard wall, essentially traveling in a similar psychic manner as the protagonist in Lovecraft's story.
- The 2021 film H.P. Lovecraft's Witch House is loosely based on the story.
- The 2022 film Venus is a loose adaptation of Lovecraft's story, relocating the setting to the Villaverde district of Madrid.

=== Television ===
- "The Dreams in the Witch House" was adapted into a short film for Showtime cable television's anthology Masters of Horror series, directed by Stuart Gordon, under the title H. P. Lovecraft's Dreams in the Witch-House. It alters the plot and minor details of the original and puts it in a contemporary setting, with Keziah Mason becoming what the film's promotional materials refer to as "a luscious she-demon" and neighbor Frank Elwood changing genders to become Frances Elwood.
- In the 2018 Netflix series Chilling Adventures of Sabrina, Part 1, Episode 5, "Dreams in a Witch House", Sabrina inadvertently releases a demon in the house that traps Sabrina and her family members in their worst nightmares.
- In 2022, the story was loosely adapted as an episode, directed by Catherine Hardwicke, for Guillermo del Toro's Cabinet of Curiosities. The episode starred Rupert Grint, Nia Vardalos, Ismael Cruz Córdova, and DJ Qualls.

=== Stage ===
- "The Dreams in the Witch House" was brought to the stage in 2008 by WildClaw Theatre Company in Chicago, in conjunction with Weird Tales Magazine's 85th anniversary, under the title "H. P. Lovecraft's The Dreams in the Witch House". It was adapted and directed by WildClaw Artistic Director Charley Sherman.

=== Literature ===
- The story and characters were adapted by the author Graham Masterton in his 1992 novel Prey.

=== Music ===
- In 2005 Dreams in the Witch House was used as the title of a compilation CD from the band H. P. Lovecraft.
- The story gives its name and lyrical inspiration to a song by German gothic metal band The Vision Bleak, present on their album Carpathia: A Dramatic Poem.
- In 2013, the H. P. Lovecraft Historical Society made a rock opera concept album titled Dreams in the Witch House: A Lovecraftian Rock Opera based on the work. The project is a Swedish/American collaboration between producers and songwriters Chris Laney, Anders Ringman and Lennart Östlund, and lyricists/book-writers Sean Branney, Mike Dalager and Andrew Leman. The album features Bruce Kulick and Doug Blair on lead guitar on some tracks. From those who have reviewed it, the album has received positive feedback but has not received mainstream attention.

=== Video games ===
- In 2023, Bonus Stage Publishing released Dreams in the Witch House, a point-and-click adventure game adaptation of the story, developed by Atom Brain Games.
