= Picts in fantasy =

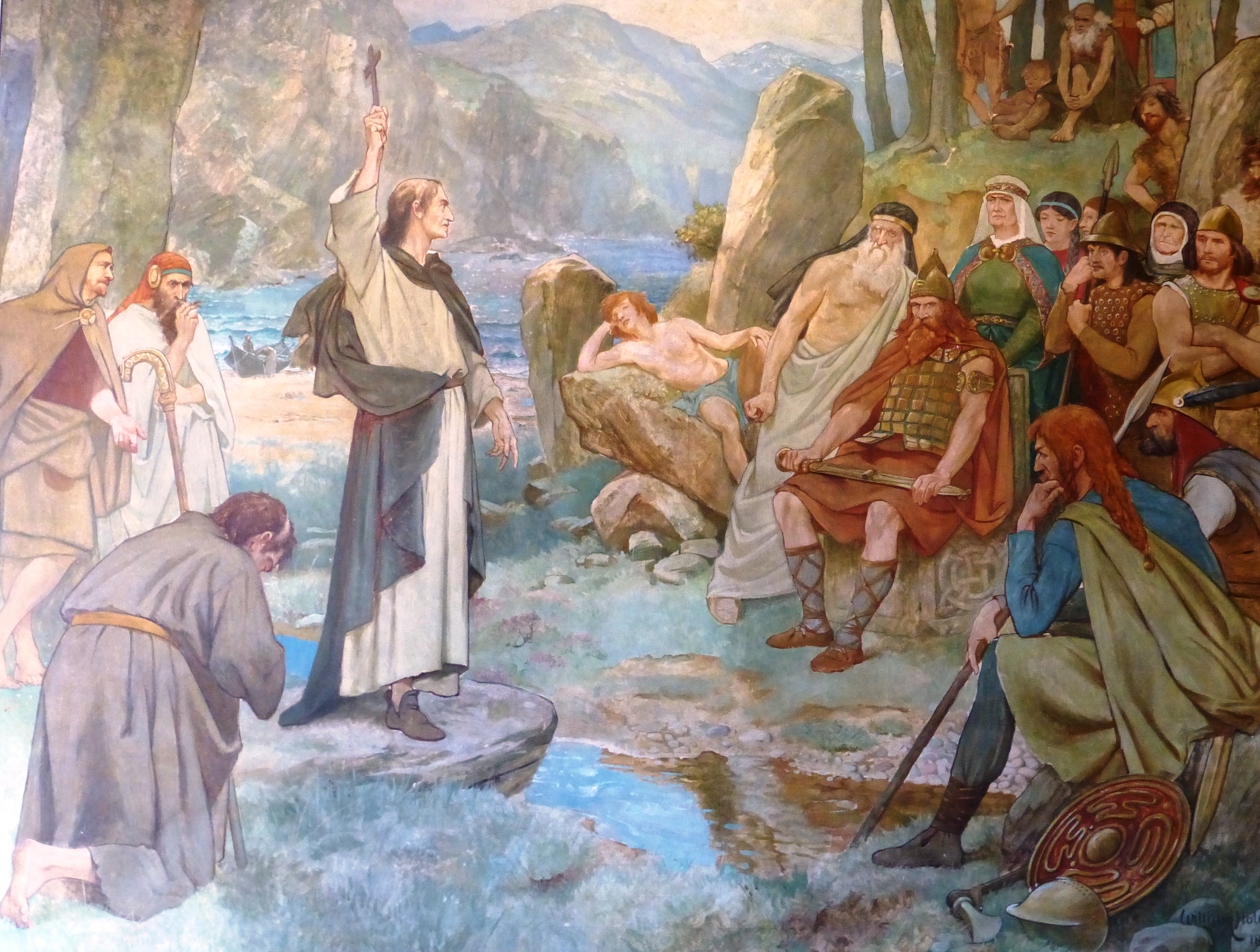
St. Columba converting the Picts to Christianity, by the 19th-century artist William Hole

Many writers have been drawn to the idea of the Picts and created fictional stories and mythology about them in the absence of much real data. This romanticised view tends to portray them as sometimes wearing the modern kilt or as noble savages, much as the view of Europeans on Native Americans in the 18th century.

== The usage of the word Pict ==
Popular etymology has long interpreted the name Pict as if it derived from the Latin the word Picti meaning "painted folk" or possibly "tattooed ones"; and this may relate to the Welsh word Pryd meaning "to mark" or "to draw". Julius Caesar, who never went near Pictland, mentions the British Celtic custom of body painting in Book V of his Gallic Wars, stating

"Omnes vero se Britanni vitro inficiunt, quod caeruleum efficit colorem, atque hoc horridiores sunt in pugna aspectu" ("In fact all Britanni stain themselves with vitrum, which produces a dark blue colour, and by this means they are more terrifying to face in battle.")

== Robert E. Howard ==
The Picts were an especial favourite race of Robert E. Howard and are mentioned frequently in his tales, having a continuity from the Thurian Age tales of King Kull of Valusia, where they are his allies, to the Hyborian Age of Conan the Barbarian, where they are the mortal enemies of the Cimmerians (who are actually descended from the old Atlanteans, though they don't remember their ancestry). Howard also wrote tales about the last King of the Picts Bran Mak Morn set in real historical time, and they figure commonly as enemies of Cormac Mac Art. Of all the races and civilizations in Howard's writings, the Picts are the race or civilization with the longest history. They even appear in his story "The Valley of the Worm", set long before Kull, where a tribe of Picts help the protagonist, Niord, battle a giant snake and a creature which resembles a shoggoth. Howard gave the Picts a sense of continuity between different ages by making Bran Mak Morn a descendant of Kull's ally Brule the Spear Slayer, and then describing how the king's soul had been affixed to a black stone statue worshiped by the medieval Picts. The status of the Picts and their civilization generally declined over time; the Picts of the Thurian Age were far more sophisticated than their primitive, brutish descendants.

Howard's Picts are said to have originated on "islands far out on the Western ocean" and gradually migrated into the Mediterranean area. At one point, they spread across large areas of the world, but gradually vanished except for several splinter groups. Although some of these groups lived in remote jungles and southern continents, the most prominent body of Picts settled in the British isles, where they displaced a supposedly mongoloid race that had been the initial residents of the isles (though their origins were elsewhere). This previous race sought refuge underground, where over a millennia they evolved into stunted and hideous creatures, who were the initial subjects of tales concerning elves or dwarves, as described in the Bran Mak Morn short story "Worms of the Earth", as well in "The Children of the Night".

The Picts were in turn displaced some thousands of years later by the invading Celts, and driven northward into Scotland where they interbred with a tribe of red-haired barbarians, resulting in a genetic shift toward diminished height. Following subsequent Roman, Breton, and Saxon invasions, the Picts too sought refuge underground, just like the natives they had displaced before.

An interesting point is that, in the Hyborian age stories such as "Beyond the Black River", when they populated the western edge of Europe and share a border with Aquilonia, which tries to push them further west to colonize new provinces, the Picts show clear Native American influence, in their appearance, dress, armament, manner of conducting wars, and even the place names of the new Aquilonian provinces. It's hard to tell whether this is a case of inconsistency on the part of Howard, or a throwback to their earliest origins and savagery, as the Picts who Conan battled during the Hyborian Age are definitely more primitive than those Kull knew many millennia earlier. The story "Kings of the Night", in which Kull is summoned forward in time to help battle a Roman army, references a decline of the Picts after the age of Kull, specifically noting the Picts lost the skills of metalworking. The Picts described in stories such as "The Dark Man", set in the early Middle Ages, portray them as more primitive yet, with a Neolithic level of technology such as flint arrowheads. These Picts are clearly a people at the last stages of decline, and are living as a hidden tribe of savages of whom their neighboring Norse, Scottish, and Irish peoples are not aware of.

Howard's descriptions of the later Picts portray them as very small in height, squat and muscular, adept at silent movement, and most of all brutish and uncivilized, quite unlike the Picts of Kull's day. They painted themselves with woad, much like the historical Picts, and lived in very large caverns, some natural and some artificially expanded. They had a custom of burning enemy prisoners alive, a ceremony usually presided over by their druid-like 'wizards' or priests, whom Howard portrayed as having a twisted philosophy and mindset produced by many years of hatred, in direct opposition to the Pictish warrior-king Bran Mak Morn, who attempted to restore the Picts to their honourable place in the world and drive out the Roman invaders.

Bran Mak Morn's mindset was very unusual for his time and location, because he favored an alliance of the "native" British populations, including the Picts, Bretons, and Celts, against the Romans, in a setting when each of these tribes fostered an intense hatred and mistrust for all the others. Robert E. Howard also mentions that some warriors among the Picts could assume the forms of wolves, in the manner of werewolves, on their own free will. These Picts were a "race" with whom Howard felt the most affinity, and for this reason they were one of his favourite subjects, despite being almost wholly fictitious and deviating from historical fact.

== Terry Pratchett ==
The Nac Mac Feegle (also known as Pictsies, the Wee Free Men, the Little Men, 'Person or Persons Unknown, Believed to be Armed', and occasionally 'The Defendants') are a type of fairy appearing in Terry Pratchett's Discworld novels Carpe Jugulum, The Wee Free Men, A Hat Full of Sky and Wintersmith. Aside from being six inches tall, they largely invert the Victorian concept of mystical and refined fairies, and hark back to the fairies of folklore, who were generally seen as occasionally helpful thieves and pests.

The Nac Mac Feegle's skin appears blue because it is heavily tattooed and covered with paint, and all have red hair. The tattoos identify a Feegle's clan. Wings or similar features of any kind are out of the question. Their speech can only be described as some sort of variation on the Scots language, usually Glaswegian in the clans encountered, although William the Gonnagle (from a different clan) has a softer, Highland accent. They are notably strong and resilient, which comes in handy given that male Feegles (almost all of them) tend to be notoriously rowdy as a lifestyle.

== Other references ==
The antagonist of renowned writer Anne Rice's The Mayfair Witches trilogy, Lasher, is revealed to be a "Taltos" which is the name given to the Picts in the Anne Rice literary universe. Rice's Pictish Taltos are not humans per se, rather they are a similar looking but vastly genetically different primate which can engage in sexual acts with humans which rarely produces viable offspring. Taltos-human hybrids usually result in the death of human mothers birthing them with the exception of human "witches" which have genetic predispositions that allow some to survive such inter-species breeding. The Stonehenge of the Salisbury Plains are attributed to Rice's humanized, complex mythological Taltos Pictish character of Saint Ashlar. Taltos can live for thousands of years but can die from blunt force trauma and trances induced by dancing or music. They are said to be a "childlike" people. Any sexual acts between fertile heterosexual Taltos couples instantaneously results in the rapid conception and birth of a new Taltos, all of which mature within hours to sexual maturity as described in Anne Rice's novels Lasher (book 2 of the trilogy) and Taltos (3rd and final book).

In the roleplaying game Pendragon, a supplemental book entitled Beyond the Wall: Pictland & The North depicts a Pictish kingdom called Caledonia during the legendary era of King Arthur."

Picts appear as characters in the Nancy Farmer's Norse-Medieval fantasy novels, The Sea of Trolls and The Land of the Silver Apples.

Picts also appear in the film Centurion, with Michael Fassbender.

In Rudyard Kipling's book Puck of Pook's Hill, a Roman soldier stationed in Britain describes the Picts as wily adversaries.

The Picts also appear in John Cowper Powys' Arthurian novel Porius (1951) as the Ffichti, a tribe in Wales of Greek descent. Powys’ Picts are allied to the ancestors of the Irish people (Gwyddylaid) and are usually referred to as “Gwyddyl-Ffichti” throughout the novel. Powys’ Nineue is also described as a Pict.

Matthew Woodring Stover wrote a pair of fantasy adventure novels, Iron Dawn (1997) and Jericho Moon (1998) about Barra, a Pictish warrior-woman travelling in the Bronze Age Near East.

Juliet Marillier wrote a fantasy series about the Pictish king Bridei, called The Bridei Chronicles, beginning with The Dark Mirror, (Pan Macmillan 2004) and continued in Blade Of Fortriu (Pan Macmillan 2005) and The Well Of Shades (Pan Macmillan 2006).

John Flanagan's novel series Ranger's Apprentice includes a country called "Picta", north of "Araluen", or the series' reflection of Scotland, in which savage, uncivilized tribes reside.

In Arthur Ransome's Swallows and Amazons series, Dick and Dorothea in The Picts and the Martyrs imagine they are Picts when hiding from their Great Aunt. In Great Northern? they find an ancient Pict House in the Outer Hebrides.

The main character of Ninja Theory's action-adventure game Hellblade: Senua's Sacrifice and its sequel, Senua's Saga: Hellblade II, is confirmed to be Pictish in origin.
