= Nameless Cults (short story collection) =

Short story collection by Robert E. Howard

Nameless Cults: The Cthulhu Mythos Fiction of Robert E. Howard
- Author: Robert E. Howard
- Illustrator: Dave Carson
- Cover artist: Harry Fassl
- Language: English
- Genre: Horror short stories
- Publisher: Chaosium
- Publication date: 2001
- Publication place: United States
- Media type: Print (Paperback)
- Pages: 353
- ISBN: 1-56882-130-1 (US-paperback)
- OCLC: 49537333

Nameless Cults: The Cthulhu Mythos Fiction of Robert E. Howard is a collection of Cthulhu Mythos short stories by Robert E. Howard. It was first published in the US in 2001 by Chaosium Press. All of these stories had been published previously, between 1929 and 1985, in Weird Tales, From Beyond the Dark Gateway, Strange Tales, Weirdbook, Fantasy Crosswinds, Coven, Fantasy Book, Dark Things, and The Fantasy Magazine.

The collection includes an introduction by Robert M. Price called "Raven, Son of Morn." Price's introduction gives a short sketch of Howard's overall writing and a more detailed overview of his Cthulhu Mythos work and its relation to that of other mythos writers.

== Contents ==
The collection includes the following stories (dates included are first publication as listed in the book):

- "The Black Stone" (1931)
- "Worms of the Earth" (1936)
- "The Little People" (1932)
- "People of the Dark" (1932)
- "The Children of the Night" (1931)
- "The Thing on the Roof" (1932)
- "The Abbey" with C. J. Henderson (1975)
- "The Fire of Asshurbanipal" (1936)
- "The Door to the World" with Joseph S. Pulver (1977)
- "The Hoofed Thing" (1970)
- "Dig Me No Grave" (1937)
- "The House in the Oaks" with August Derleth
- "The Black Bear Bites" (1974)
- "The Shadow Kingdom" (1929)
- "The Gods of Bal-Sagoth" (1931)
- "Skull-Face" (1929)
- "Black Eons" with Robert M. Price (1985)
- "The Challenge from Beyond" with C. L. Moore, A. Merritt, H. P. Lovecraft, and Frank Belknap Long (1935)

== Reviews ==
- Envoyer (German) (Issue 67 - May 2002)

== Related works ==
- Robert E. Howard bibliography
