= Caine's Law =

2012 novel by Matthew Stover

- Cover
- Author: Matthew Woodring Stover
- Language: English
- Series: Acts of Caine
- Genre: Science fantasy
- Publisher: Del Rey
- Publication date: 2012-04-03
- Publication place: United States
- Pages: 496
- ISBN: 0345455894
- Preceded by: Caine Black Knife

Caine's Law is a 2012 science fantasy novel by American writer Matthew Stover. Published by Del Rey on April 3, 2012, it is the fourth and most recent novel in the Acts of Caine series. It is subtitled as "Act of Atonement, Book Two" and completes the narrative arc begun in Caine Black Knife, continuing directly from its predecessor's cliffhanger ending. Its original working title, announced shortly after the publication of Caine Black Knife, was His Father's Fist.

The novel is highly non-linear in its narrative. The afterword is immediately followed by the prologue. The epigraph warns the reader that some chapters are chronologically set before Caine Black Knife, others are set after, and some are set both before and after due to the time travel involved. Yet more chapters are set in alternate timelines incompatible with the events of the main series, and some may be imaginary in their entirety. Unlike Caine Black Knife, no easy-to-follow key in the table of contents is provided, and the reader is left to figure out which chapters are which from the clues in the text.

== Plot summary ==
The novel's narrative is extremely non-linear and defies any attempt at chronological summary. The following is merely an attempt to recap the key revelations that are presented as the least ambiguous.

Several parts of this story take place before the events depicted in Act of Atonement Book I, Caine Black Knife. Other parts of this story take place after. Still other parts take place before and after both. Some parts may be imaginary, and some were real only temporarily, as they have subsequently unhappened.

— Caine's Law Epigraph

1,000 years ago, the elves of Overworld severed all contact with Earth, but it was too late. Escaped humans brought to Overworld as slaves were multiplying at a frantic pace, and natives races of Overworld only avoided the total extermination because of the human tendency to split into warring groups worshipping different gods, who would answer prayers by reaching through time and altering the past to affect the present. Warring gods undid one another back and forth, resulting in Chaos where nothing was permanent, the Past least of all.

500 years ago, two brothers, Jantho and Jereth, led a revolt against the gods. Jereth wielded the Sword of Man, wounds from which that were permanent and could not be undone by any god. After Jereth had slaughtered hundreds of them, the gods called for parley, resulting in the Covenant of Pirichanthe: the gods were bound outside of time, unable to interfere directly, but could still affect human affairs by empowering their worshippers. Jantho founded the Monasteries to keep watch over the gods and created the Vaults of Binding, unaffected by alterations of history.

After the Assumption of Ma'elKoth, (Note: As depicted in Blade of Tyshalle) Caine slowly comes to realize that the Covenant was broken when he killed Ma'elKoth and made him into a true God. Now there are again signs of gods answering prayers directly, while the Vaults of the Monasteries are found to contain histories of events that could not have happened — some of them involving or even written by Caine himself. When the god of Black Knives answered Caine's prayer 25 years ago, (Note: As depicted in Caine Black Knife) that was one such Intervention that should have been impossible.

Caine also suspects that when he killed Ma'elKoth, he also died (as everyone else within 200 yards of him was vaporized) and that his present self is a duplicate construct created by a god — which gods can do and both Ma'elKoth and Pallas Ril were capable of. Under the alias "Jonathan Fist", he meets an immortal woman known only as the Horse-Witch who already knows Caine and tells him that they were both present at the Covenant. The Horse-Witch also explains that she remembers every alternate timeline that had "unhappened", including those where she and Fist met as very different people. Caine slowly comes to accept himself as the metaphysical representation of the Sword of Man.

Versions of Caine, or at least men who look like him, appear inexplicably at different points in the past. One appears mere days ago in Boedecken, picking up immediately after Caine was taken to Earth as a prisoner. Another runs into seven year-old Hari Michaelson on the day of his mother's death. Yet another appears a year before Caine's birth, accompanied by Angvasse Khlaylock, he attempts to radically alter the history of elvenfolk by warning them about their upcoming extinction from HRVP. Their King reveals that Angvasse's god Khryl was Jantho himself, who along with his brother surrendered their immortality before starting the revolt.

In a metaphorical space outside of time, Caine gathers his allies: the Horse-Witch, Angvasse Khlaylock (also an avatar of Khryl), Deliann Mithondionne, Pallas Ril, Ma'elKoth, and his father Duncan. He explains that Pirichanthe was unable to perform his task of keeping the other gods away, which is why he chose Caine for the task. In Boedecken, versions of Caine and Angvasse are about to recover and reunite the holy relics of Jantho and Jereth, while in an alternate past the elves prepare to recreate the Covenant but bind a different God instead of Pirichanthe. Caine has been playing the timelines for this outcome, but the consequences are unknowable and could destroy the universe; the others agree to proceed.

On Earth, immediately following his arrest, Caine presents the Studio with an offer of cooperation, which is rejected. They counter-offer with a promise to inflict horrific suffering on Duncan unless Caine willingly joins himself with the Blind God. Caine accepts, but the god's blood only fuels Caine, who easily kills his guards and destroys his restraints. Caine reveals that he had been in control for a long time, as his allies make a show of force involving griffins, and dragons on Earth to persuade the Studio to keep away from Overworld.

== Reception ==
Kirkus Reviews warned that readers new to the series would find the first hundred or so pages bewildering, but suggested that persistence would be rewarded as the setting and stakes came into focus. The review singled out the scenes between Caine and the horse-witch for their tenderness and called the book "brutal, witty, insightful, addictive, frequently baffling and altogether astonishing".

A review on SFFWorld noted that the novel rewarded slow, careful reading, and that while its narrative games were as strong as those in Blade of Tyshalle, the horse-witch sequences, while often powerful, were the most unevenly paced part of the book. The reviewer noted that the novel wasn't perfect but concluded that "I liked the book a lot".

FanFiAddict judged the book shorter and less violent than Blade of Tyshalle but more literary, praising the character work in the finale as "absolutely scintillating" and the new character Tanner as the series' funniest, while conceding that the book's ambition may overwhelm some readers.

The review of the series in the Grimdark Magazine noted that Caine's Law turns metaphysical and admitted that despite being briefly lost midway through the reviewer came to admire the artful plot, calling the result a "satisfying if occasionally confusing experience".
