= People of the Dark =

1932 short story collection by Robert E. Howard

People of the Dark is a collection of stories by Robert E. Howard, published in 1932. It is the third volume of The Weird Works of Robert E. Howard series, by Wildside Press. It was first published in Strange Tales, June 1932.

The title story features the first appearance of Conan the Barbarian. Several of its stories are considered part of the Cthulhu Mythos.

== Contents ==
- "Kings of the Night"
- "The Children of the Night"
- "The Footfalls Within"
- "The Gods of Bal-Sagoth"
- "The Black Stone"
- "The Dark Man"
- "The Thing on the Roof"
- "The Horror from the Mound"
- "People of the Dark"
