= The Essential Conan =

1998 collection of short stories written by Robert E. Howard

- Dust-jacket the first edition
- Author: Robert E. Howard
- Cover artist: Ken Kelly
- Language: English
- Series: Berkley Conan
- Genre: Fantasy
- Publisher: Science Fiction Book Club
- Publication date: 1998
- Publication place: United States
- Media type: Print (hardback)
- Pages: 643 pp
- ISBN: 1-56865-803-6
- OCLC: 41031602

The Essential Conan is a collection of fantasy short stories written by Robert E. Howard featuring his sword and sorcery hero Conan the Barbarian. The book was published in 1998 by the Science Fiction Book Club. It collects the editions of the Conan books, edited by Karl Edward Wagner and published by Berkley Books in 1977. Most of the stories originally appeared in the magazines Weird Tales, The Phantagraph and The Howard Collector. The Wagner editions were the first to virtually reproduce Howard's original stories without any editorial changes other than typo fixes.

== Contents ==
- The Hour of the Dragon
  - Foreword, by Karl Edward Wagner
  - "The Hour of the Dragon" (poem)
  - "The Hour of the Dragon"
- The People of the Black Circle
  - Foreword, by Karl Edward Wagner
  - "The Devil in Iron"
  - "The People of the Black Circle"
  - "A Witch Shall Be Born"
  - "Jewels of Gwahlur"
  - Afterword, by Karl Edward Wagner
- Red Nails
  - Foreword, by Karl Edward Wagner
  - "Beyond the Black River"
  - "Shadows in Zamboula"
  - "Red Nails"
  - "The Hyborian Age" (essay)
  - Afterword, by Karl Edward Wagner
