= Black Knife =

Black Knife, Blackknife, or black knife may refer to:

- Black Knife, Spanish name Dangerous Negro, Baishan (c. 1816 – 1857), a Chihenne (Mimbres) Apache chieftain involved in the Apache Wars.
- Sgian-dubh ("black knife" or "hidden knife"), singled-edged knife, part of traditional Scottish Highland dress
- Blackknife, a model of Modulus Guitars
- Black Knife, a song from the Deltarune Soundtrack which plays in Deltarune Chapter 3

== See also ==
- Caine Black Knife
- Athame
