= The Dark Man and Others =

1963 anthology of short stories by Robert E. Howard

- Cover of the first edition
- Author: Robert E. Howard
- Cover artist: Frank Utpatel
- Language: English
- Genre: Adventure, horror, historical fiction, fantasy, sword and sorcery, weird fiction, weird West
- Published: 1963 Arkham House
- Publication place: United States
- Media type: Print

The Dark Man and Others is a posthumously published anthology of fifteen short stories by American author Robert E. Howard, named after his short story "The Dark Man", and covering the genres of adventure fiction, horror, historical fiction, fantasy, sword and sorcery, weird fiction and the weird West. It was first published in 1963 by Arkham House, and was edited by August Derleth. Eleven of the stories had previously been published in the pulp magazine Weird Tales, and one each in Argosy, Oriental Stories and Strange Tales. It was reprinted in 1971 as a paperback by Lancer.

== Contents ==
- Introduction, by August Derleth
- The Voice of El-Lil
- Pigeons from Hell
- The Dark Man
- The Gods of Bal-Sagoth
- People of the Dark
- The Children of the Night
- The Dead Remember
- The Man on the Ground
- The Garden of Fear
- The Thing on the Roof
- The Hyena
- Dig Me No Grave
- The Dream Snake
- In the Forest of Villefère
- Old Garfield's Heart

== Bibliography ==
- Chalker, Jack L. (1998). The Science-Fantasy Publishers. Mirage Press.
- Jaffery, Sheldon (1989). The Arkham House Companion. Starmont House. ISBN 155742005X
- Joshi, S. T. (1999). Sixty Years of Arkham House compiled by S. T. Joshi. Arkham House. ISBN 0870541765
- Nielsen, Leon (2004). Arkham House Books: A Collector's Guide. McFarland & Company. ISBN 0786417854
