= Heroes Die =

1998 novel by Matthew Stover

- First edition
- Author: Matthew Stover
- Cover artist: Doug Beekman
- Language: English
- Genre: Fantasy, science fiction
- Publisher: Del Rey (US)
- Publication date: 21 July 1998 (US)
- Publication place: United States
- Media type: Print (Trade Paperback & Mass Market Paperback)
- Pages: 563 (US 1st edition)
- ISBN: 0-345-42104-3 (US trade paperback edition), ISBN 0-345-42145-0 (US mass market paperback edition)
- OCLC: 38055983
- Dewey Decimal: 813/.54 21
- LC Class: PS3569.T6743 C35 1998
- Followed by: Blade of Tyshalle

Heroes Die is a science fantasy novel by American writer Matthew Stover, the first of a series of novels featuring the protagonist Caine. Caine (actor Hari Michaelson) is the son of a now-mentally ill libertarian professor and is married to Pallas Ril (actor Shanna Leighton). Approaching his forties, Caine is one of the most famous Actors in the world, recognized anywhere for his series of incredibly brutal adventures on the parallel world called "Overworld".

Heroes Die utilizes multiple points of view; a number of characters including Hari, Shanna, and Berne are used as third-person narrators for various parts of the story. However, for the scenes from Hari's perspective when he is on Overworld as Caine, the sections are portrayed from a first-person viewpoint and are meant to be Caine's interior soliloquies he runs for the benefit of the audiences on Earth; toward the end of the novel he addresses the audience directly. These segments tend to be more in plain speech, more peppered with profanity, shorter paragraphs, and tangents that follow Caine's train of thought. The violence within the Acts of Caine is often portrayed in graphic detail.

== Setting ==
In the early 23rd century, (Note: The dates given in Caine Black Knife place the events of Heroes Die around 2202 A.D.) Earth is an ecologically ruined world ruled by corporations in a strict caste system after a plague outbreak had brought down the old world governments. During the 22nd century, a way to travel to "Overworld", a parallel world of magick, fantastical creatures, and warring empires, had been discovered. The Studio system is set up to send Actors to Overworld, assume the identities of the locals, and seek out violence in the most entertaining way possible.

Objects and people naturally decay outside their native universe, so the Actors must undergo either amplitude modification ("ammod"), which allows them to remain on Overworld indefinitely but can only recover their experiences upon the return to Earth, or frequency modification ("freemod"), which requires constant energy but enables to stream their experiences live. Audiences experience the Adventures as a full-body experience of all sensations of their Actor's body.

== Plot summary ==
While on an Adventure to smuggle dissidents out of the city of Ankhana, Pallas Ril is ambushed by Emperor Ma'elKoth's secret police. Her allies Lamorak (actor Carl Shanks) and Talann (a native woman) are captured, but Pallas uses a Spell of Eternal Forgetting that prevents anyone from connecting her to her secret identity as "Simon Jester". (Note: A reference to The Moon is a Harsh Mistress.) Unknown to Pallas, the Spell also severs her fremod connection to Earth, leaving her with less than a week before dying a gruesome death.

Hari Michaelson is offered by Studio administrator Kollberg a chance to save his estranged wife, on the condition that he also kill Emperor Ma'elKoth, as the resulting succession war would provide a fertile ground for new Adventures. Transported to Ankhana, Caine checks with various contacts: Majesty, ruler of the underground kingdom of thieves and beggars, Kierendal, a fey owner of a brothel/casino, and the Monasteries, a sovereign state without territory devoted to protecting humanity from the gods. Caine is taken to the Emperor's palace and is met by Ma'elKoth's trusted servants: Duke Toa-Sytell and Berne, a sadistic rapist warrior. Ma'elKoth, a physically perfect human with god-like powers, hires Caine to uncover the identity of "Simon Jester". Caine suggests breaking Talann and Lamorak out of the prison and letting them take him to "Simon". Ma'elKoth provides information that allows Caine to execute a daring rescue. They regroup at the hideout and meet Pallas, informing her of her condition. Caine realizes that Pallas has been sleeping with Lamorak, who sold her out to Berne, but before he can act or speak he is abruptly teleported back to Earth.

Kollberg warns Caine not to implicate Lamorak in any way, otherwise his wife would be left to die. When Caine returns to the hideout, the others are gone. Pallas calculates that she has enough time left and proceeds with her plan to smuggle the dissidents. Lamorak sells her out again and stays back due to his wounds. Pallas and Talann are ambushed by Berne, who kills Talann while Pallas uses magick to reach beyond her limits and makes contact with the river god Chambaraya. Agreeing to become his Aspect, she uses her new power to get the dissidents out, but her mortal body is left exhausted. She is captured and interrogated by Ma'elKoth about "Simon Jester", the Spell still being active.

Caine returns to Ma'elKoth and proposes a trap for "Simon Jester", using an illusion of Ma'elKoth as bait while his real self would be safely away. Caine then goes to Majesty and Kierendal and presents them with a plan to overthrow Ma'elKoth and install Toa-Sytell in his place. A conspiracy is formed, but some of its members are found out by Berne. He informs Ma'elKoth, who decides to disrupt Caine's plan by appearing in person with all his power instead of as a mere illusion — exactly as Caine had intended. At the public execution of Lamorak and Pallas Ril, Ma'elKoth prepares to kill Pallas and absorb her memories to finally expose "Simon Jester" when Caine appears. Berne fights Caine, while Pallas taps into the river god's power again and fights Ma'elKoth as an equal. Caine kills Berne by allowing himself to get stabbed through the gut. Caine then decapitates Lamorak and tosses his head to Ma'elKoth to read his memories. Ma'elKoth learns that Lamorak was an Actor and had betrayed Pallas Ril on Kollberg's orders. The instant those words are uttered, Caine and Pallas, who cradles his body, are teleported back to Earth, and Caine grabs Ma'elKoth to pull him along as well.

Kollberg is made the scapegoat for the Studio's actions; his job is given to Michaelson, now paraplegic from Berne's wound. Hari and Shanna reconcile, while Ma'elKoth quickly adjusts to life on Earth as a political prisoner. On Overworld, Toa-Sytell becomes the Empire's Steward and the Patriarch of the Church of Ma'elKoth, revered as an ascended god.

== Major themes ==
Heroes Die contains moral questions the author does not believe typically arise in fantasy. In a 1999 interview regarding the novel, Stover describes it as follows:

"It's a piece of violent entertainment that's a meditation on violent entertainment- as a concept in itself, as a cultural obsession. It's a love story: romantic love, paternal love, repressed homoerotic love, love of money, of power, of country, love betrayed and employed as both carrot and stick. It's about all different kinds of heroes and all the different ways they die."
