= Bran Mak Morn =

- Created by: Robert E. Howard

In-universe information
- Gender: Male
- Occupation: King

Bran Mak Morn is a hero of five pulp fiction short stories by Robert E. Howard. In the stories, most of which were first published in Weird Tales, Bran is the last king of Howard's romanticized version of the tribal race of Picts.

== Howard's history of the Picts ==
At the age of 13, Howard, being of Scottish-Irish descent, began his studies of Scottish history and became fascinated with what he calls "the small dark Mediterranean aborigines of Britain". This "Mediterranean aborigines" reference described Howard's readings on the now-discredited Turanid race theory of the 19th century and the early 20th century, proposing a common Mediterranean origin for varied European peoples of the Neolithic era. As these Picts were portrayed as inferior to later tribes, Howard imagined them as a link between modern and ancient times.

His Picts originated on a group of islands in the Western Ocean at the time Valusia, the kingdom of the Atlantean Kull, existed. The Picts and the barbaric Atlanteans had some kind of ancient blood feud. King Kull, however, formed a strong political link between the Pictish Isles and his kingdom of Valusia. When Atlantis, Lemuria, and Valusia sank into the sea thousands of years after Kull's time, the Picts survived and were flung into a period of cultural decline. They forgot the art of metalworking and returned to their technique of flintknapping.

Howard marks Bran as the "chief of the Cruithni Picts" suggesting that he followed the belief that the Picts once colonized Northern Ireland as well as Scotland (cf Cruthin).

They migrated north until they reached Caledon, the northern lands of the later British Isles. They drove the extant tribes northward until the Aryans, Celts, and Germans invaded.

The Picts were pushed to the North, where they mingled with the tribes they had defeated earlier. Forgetting most of their technological skills, they became brutish and skilled in warcraft.

Although Bran Mak Morn has dark eyes, he does not resemble the Caledonian Picts as Howard depicts them. He refers to himself as a Mediterranean, possibly meaning that he associates himself with the more ancient Picts.

Following Bran Mak Morn's death, he is deified and worshipped as the "Dark Man" or "Dark One" by the Caledonians of Pictish descent. There seems to be a cult centred around him on "the Isle of Altar, near the Scottish mainland". There is a legend, similar to the idea that Brân the Blessed's severed head guards Britain from invasion, about Bran: "mayhap we shall come to you again in your need, as Bran Mak Morn, great king of Pictdom, shall come again to his people some day in the days to come."

In "Tigers of the Sea", taking place in the time of King Arthur, Picts are one of the groups active in the turbulent British Islands in the aftermath of the Fall of Rome. In one story, they kidnap a Briton girl and intend on sacrificing her to their deity. In another, they are oppressed by Norse invaders before planning a bloody and ruthless revenge. Cormac Mac Art, Howard's Irish Viking character, alternately fights them or makes temporary alliances with them, as circumstances dictate. None of the stories set in this period makes any mention of Bran Mak Morn.

Howard's Picts still seems to be a mysterious, active fighting force during the Norwegian occupation of the Scottish islands under Magnus Barefoot as late as the 11th Century. They seem to be withdrawing from civilization at this time: "When the Scot Kenneth McAlpine broke the Kingdom of Galloway, the last remnant of the Pictish empire faded like snow on the mountains. Like wolves, we live now among the scattered islands, among the crags of the highlands and the dim hills of Galloway. We are a fading people."

In the story "The Children of the Night" (1931) set in contemporary times, a character states that a "Bran Cult", involving the worship of Bran's statue in a secret cave, still exists among the modern descendants of the Picts.

== Picts in fantasy ==
Many writers have been drawn to the idea of the Picts and created fictional stories or mythology about them in the absence of real knowledge. This romanticized view tends to portray them as occasionally noble savages, much as the view of Europeans on Native Americans in the 18th century. Howard is not among these romantics, representing his Picts as a tribe of primitive savages sinking into brutehood, with Bran alone avoiding this decay. In fact, Robert E. Howard's romanticism belongs more to view of the "Celtic Twilight" (see Celtic Revival) – showing the Picts suffering a "Pictish Twilight" at the hands of the Celts, Romans, and Scandinavians in the Bran Mak Morn story strand.

They are a special favorite race of Robert E. Howard and are mentioned frequently in his tales. The Picts have a continuity throughout Howard's fiction. In terms of internal chronology, the Picts first appear in the James Allison stories "Marchers of Valhalla" (c. 1932) and "The Valley of the Worm" (1934) where the Picts are a prehistoric tribe at the beginnings of human history. Later, the descendants of these Picts appear in the tales of King Kull of Atlantis, where they are Kull's allies (although culturally enemies of his people, the Atlanteans), and the Hyborian Age of Conan the Barbarian where they are the mortal enemies of the Cimmerians, who are actually descended from the old Atlanteans though they do not remember their ancestry or alliance. The Picts of the Hyborian Age are depicted as analogous to Native Americans. Howard also wrote tales about the last King of the Picts, Bran Mak Morn, set in real historical time and they figure commonly as enemies of Cormac Mac Art. These Picts are closer to the common image of cave men than to Native Americans. In fact, the character of Brule, the Spear Slayer, in the Kull stories, is a member of the Pre-Cataclysmic Age Picts. The world of Kull is destroyed by a Great Cataclysm, which drives its peoples northward and reduces them to "brute hood". Over a millennium, the humans rise again to a barbaric culture and start to spread out once more over the world.

According to the long historical exposition which Howard attributes to a Pict wizard in "Men of the Shadows", the Picts have originated in the westernmost reaches of North America and gradually migrated eastwards until reaching the Mediterranean area. At one time, they spread to large areas of the world, but gradually vanished except for several splinter groups. Although some of these groups lived in remote jungles and southern continents, the most prominent body of Picts settled in the British isles, where they displaced a supposedly mongoloid race that had been the initial residents of the isles (though their origins were elsewhere).

An interesting point is that, in the Hyborian age, when they populate the western edge of Europe and share a border with Aquilonia, which tries to push them further west to colonize new provinces, the Picts show clear Native American influence, in their appearance, dress, armament, manner of conducting wars, and even in the regional names of the new Aquilonian provinces. It is hard to tell whether this is a case of inconsistency on the part of Howard, or a throwback to their earliest origins and savagery, as Hyborian Picts are definitely more primitive and savage than those Kull knew.

Eventually, as Howard describes in "The Hyborian Age", the Picts gain metal-working and armored cavalry, unite under a charismatic leader, conquer the Hyborian kingdoms, and destroy Aquilonia. They are eventually engulfed in the cataclysm which ends the Hyborian Age, though a relict survives into later times.

This previous race sought refuge underground, and over long millennia they evolved into stunted and hideous creatures, who were the initial subjects of tales concerning elves and dwarves. The Picts were in turn displaced by the invading Celts. So, they fled northward and interbred with a tribe of "red haired barbarians", resulting in a genetic shift toward diminished height. Following subsequent Roman, Breton, and Saxon invasions, the Picts too sought refuge underground, just like the natives they had displaced before.

Howard's descriptions of the later Picts portray them as very small in height, squat and muscular, adept at silent movement, and most of all brutish and uncivilized. They painted themselves with woad, much like the historical Picts, and lived in very large caverns, some natural and some artificially expanded. They had a custom of burning enemy prisoners alive, a ceremony usually presided over by their 'wizards' or priests, whom Howard portrayed as having a twisted philosophy and mindset produced by many years of hatred, in direct opposition to the Pictish warrior-king Bran Mak Morn, who attempted to restore the Picts to their honourable place in the world and drive out the Roman invaders.

Bran Mak Morn's mindset was very unusual for his time and location, because he favored an alliance between the "native" British populations, including the Picts, Bretons, and Celts, against the Romans, in a setting when each of these tribes fostered an intense hatred or mistrust for all the others. Robert E. Howard also mentions that some warriors among the Picts could assume the forms of wolves, in the manner of werewolves, on their own free will. These Picts were a "race" with whom Howard felt the most affinity, and for this reason they were one of his favorite subjects, despite being almost wholly fictitious and deviating from historical fact.

== The life of Bran Mak Morn ==
The exact time of Bran's life is unclear. In a synopsis for an unwritten Bran Mak Morn story, Howard dates the character's time period to the end of the 3rd century of the Christian Era, while Rome was ruled by the co-emperors Diocletian and Maximian. He is mentioned as both a chief and king. Bran lead his Picts in attacks against Hadrian's Wall, causing the later Roman Empire some trouble. He travels as far south as the city of Eboracum (York). He is said to have died in battle.

== The name ==
The name is derived from the name of Brennus, the Gaul who sacked Rome, and comes from a Britonnic word meaning "raven". One should also not overlook Bran the Blessed, the giant "High King of the Isles of the Mighty" in the Welsh Mabinogion. Howard says the Mak Morn was inspired by the Irish hero Goll mac Morna. He added a k to give the name a non-Gaelic appearance.

== Cthulhu Mythos ==
The Bran Mak Morn stories are connected to the Cthulhu Mythos and occur in the same fictional universe. Twice in Worms of the Earth mention is made of the black gods of R'lyeh, resting place of Cthulhu in the works of H. P. Lovecraft, a friend and correspondent of Howard. In the earliest extant copy of Worms of the Earth, mention of Cthulhu himself is made by name although this was later changed to Nameless Gods in the final edition. Also mentioned in the same story is Dagon, a water monster mentioned in some stories by Lovecraft and named after a real-world Philistine god. Lovecraft himself references Bran Mak Morn (as Bran) in his "The Whisperer in Darkness".

== Homage ==
Bran Mac Mufin, a character in Dave Sim's comic book series Cerebus the Aardvark, is an homage to and parody of Bran Mak Morn. His name is a play on words, referring to the pastry bran muffin and the McDonald's breakfast sandwich the McMuffin.

== Stories ==
Most of Howard's Bran Mak Morn stories were first published in Weird Tales. A few stories did not appear in print until after Howard's death.

Note: The order of publication does not correspond with the order in which the stories were written.

- "Kings of the Night" (first publication: Weird Tales, November 1930). The first story to feature Bran as a king and describes him as a direct descendant of another Howard character, Brule the Spear-Slayer, companion of the Atlantean King Kull. Bran is fighting against the Romans and Gonar, a wizard, summons up the millennia-dead King Kull to assist him. The two are compared and contrasted throughout the story.
- "The Dark Man" (Weird Tales, December 1931). Set centuries after Bran's death, he appears as an idol worshipped by the surviving Picts in which his soul is said to be resident.
- "Worms of the Earth" (Weird Tales, November 1932). The last Bran story and the only story told through the Pict's point of view.
- "Men of the Shadows" (Bran Mak Morn, Dell, 1969). Originally a poem placed at the beginning of the Bran Mak Morn story (1926) of the same name. The poem was first published in 1957 in Always Comes Evening, a collection of Howard poems. The poem and the story, which features Bran as a chief instead of a king, were first published together in the Dell novel. This was Howard's first Bran Mak Morn story.
- "Bran Mak Morn" (Bran Mak Morn: A Play & Others, Cryptic Publications, 1983). Also known as "Bran Mak Morn: A Play". Written in 1922/1923.
- "The Children of the Night". In this tale, Bran does not appear directly but rather the story elaborates on his cult, which first appears in "The Dark Man" and which seems to have survived into the 20th Century. Elements in the narrative correspond with the timeline and events noted in "Worms of the Earth".

=== Poems ===
- A Song of the Race (Bran Mak Morn, Dell, 1969).

=== Fragments ===
- Untitled, "A grey sky arched over the dreary waste. ..."
- Untitled, "Men have had visions ere now. ..." The fragment is believed to be the beginning of a Bran Mak Morn story.

== Book editions ==
=== Collections ===
Howard's stories, poems, and fragments featuring Bran Mak Morn have been published several times as a collection in book form. Not every publication has been a complete collection.

- Bran Mak Morn, Dell, 1969.
- Worms of the Earth, Donald M. Grant, 1974. Illustrated by David Ireland.
- Worms of the Earth, Zebra Books, July 1975.
- Worms of the Earth, Orbit, 1976.
- Worms of the Earth, Ace, June 1979.
- Bran Mak Morn, Baen, January 1996.
- Bran Mak Morn: The Last King, Wandering Star, 2001.
- Bran Mak Morn: The Last King, Del Rey, June 2005.

=== Pastiches ===
Other writers have published novels featuring Howard's Bran Mak Morn.

- Maker of Shadows, Jack Mann, Wright & Brown,, 1938.
- Legion from the Shadows, Karl Edward Wagner, Zebra Books, 1976.
- For the Witch of the Mists, David C. Smith and Richard Tierney, Ace Books, March 1981.
- He was detailed in Wayne Barlowe's Barlowe's Guide to Fantasy (1996).

== Adaptations ==
=== Comics ===
Bran Mak Morn has appeared in several issues of Marvel Comics' Savage Sword of Conan. In 1974 "Men of Shadows" was adapted by writer Roy Thomas and appeared in SSoC #102-104, and 106.

Dark Horse Comics published Robert E. Howard's Savage Sword which features stories such as "Worms of the Earth" to "Men of Shadows" to "Kings of the Night". Some are brand new adaptations exclusive to the title, while others are reprints from previous publications.

=== Music ===
Two bands have written songs about Bran Mak Morn:

- Bran Mak Morn Blues by Breathing the Void.
- The Last King of Pictdom by Eternal Champion.

== Copyright and trademark ==
The name Bran Mak Morn and the names of Robert E. Howard's other principal characters are trademarked by Paradox Entertainment of Stockholm, Sweden, through its US subsidiary Paradox Entertainment Inc. Paradox also holds copyrights on the stories written by other authors under license from Robert E. Howard Properties Inc. Since Robert E. Howard published his Bran Mak Morn stories at a time when the date of publication was the marker, the owners had to use the copyright symbol, and they had to renew after a certain time to maintain copyright, the exact status of all of Howard's Bran Mak Morn works are in question.

The Australian site of Project Gutenberg has many Robert E. Howard stories, including several Bran Mak Morn stories. This indicates that, in their opinion, the stories are free from copyright under Australian law (based on 50 years after the author's death).

"Kings of the Night" was first published in 1930, and so is clearly in Public Domain in the United States.

Subsequent stories written by other authors are subject to the copyright laws of the relevant time.

== See also ==
- Picts in fantasy
