= The People of the Black Circle (collection) =

1977 collection of short stories by Robert E. Howard

- Cover of first edition
- Author: Robert E. Howard
- Cover artist: Ken Kelly
- Language: English
- Series: Conan the Barbarian
- Genre: Sword and sorcery
- Publisher: Berkley/Putnam
- Publication date: 1977
- Publication place: United States
- Media type: Print (hardcover)

The People of the Black Circle is a 1977 collection of four fantasy short stories by American writer Robert E. Howard, featuring his sword and sorcery hero Conan the Barbarian. The collection was edited by Karl Edward Wagner. It was first published in hardcover by Berkley/Putnam in 1977, and in paperback by Berkley Books the same year. It was reprinted in hardcover for the Science Fiction Book Club, also in 1977, and combined with the Wagner-edited The Hour of the Dragon and Red Nails in the book club's omnibus edition The Essential Conan in 1998. The stories originally appeared in the fantasy magazine Weird Tales in the 1930s.

The pieces in The People of the Black Circle, in common with those in the other Conan volumes produced by Karl Edward Wagner for Berkley, are virtual reproductions (other than typo correction) of the originally published form of the texts as they appeared in Weird Tales, in contrast to the edited versions appearing in the earlier Gnome Press and Lancer editions of the Conan stories. In contrast to the earlier editions, which included Conan tales by authors other than Howard, Wagner took a purist approach, including only stories by Howard, and only those thought to be in the public domain. His prefaces and afterwords dismiss editorial revisions made in the earlier editions.

== Contents ==
- "Foreword" by Karl Edward Wagner
- "The Devil in Iron"
- "The People of the Black Circle"
- "A Witch Shall Be Born"
- "Jewels of Gwahlur"
- "Afterword" by Karl Edward Wagner

Preceded by The Hour of the Dragon	Berkley Conan series (publication order)	Succeeded by Red Nails
