= Always Comes Evening =

Book by Robert E. Howard

- Jacket illustration by Frank Utpatel for Always Comes Evening
- Author: Robert E. Howard
- Cover artist: Frank Utpatel
- Language: English
- Genre: poetry
- Publisher: Arkham House
- Publication date: 1957; 69 years ago
- Publication place: United States
- Media type: Print (Hardback)
- Pages: x, 86 pp

Always Comes Evening is a collection of poems by Robert E. Howard. It was released in 1957 and was the author's second book to be published by Arkham House. It was released in an edition of 636 copies. The publication was subsidized by Howard's literary executor, Glenn Lord who compiled the poems.

The volume exists in two states. 536 copies had the title and Howard's name running from bottom to top of the spine, as done in Europe. When the error was discovered during the printing process, the last 100 copies were made American-style with the title and Howard's name running from top to bottom.

== Contents ==
Always Comes Evening contains the following poems:

1. "Foreword", by Glenn Lord
2. "Introduction", by Dale Hart
3. "Always Comes Evening"
4. "The Poets"
5. "The Singer in the Mist"
6. "Solomon Kane's Homecoming"
7. "Futility"
8. "The Song of the Bats"
9. "The Moor Ghost"
10. "Recompense"
11. "The Hills of Kandahar"
12. "Which Will Scarcely Be Understood"
13. "Haunting Columns"
14. "The Last Hour"
15. "Ships"
16. "The King and the Oak"
17. "The Riders of Babylon"
18. "Easter Island"
19. "Moon Mockery"
20. "Shadows on the Road"
21. "The Soul-Eater"
22. "The Dream and the Shadow"
23. "The Ghost Kings"
24. "Desert Dawn"
25. "An Open Window"
26. "The Song of a Mad Minstrel"
27. "The Gates of Nineveh"
28. "Fragment"
29. "The Harp of Alfred"
30. "Remembrance"
31. "Crete"
32. "Forbidden Magic"
33. "Black Chant Imperial"
34. "A Song Out of Midian"
35. "Arkham"
36. "Voices of the Night"
37. "Song at Midnight"
38. "The Ride of Falume"
39. "Autumn"
40. "Dead Man's Hate"
41. "One Who Comes at Eventide"
42. "To A Woman"
43. "Emancipation"
44. "Retribution"
45. "Chant of the White Beard"
46. "Rune/The Road of Azrael"
47. "Song of the Pict"
48. "Prince and Beggar"
49. "Hymn of Hatred"
50. "Invective"
51. "Men of the Shadows"
52. "Babylon"
53. "Niflheim"
54. "The Heart of the Sea's Desire"
55. "Laughter in the Gulf"
56. "A Song of the Don Cossacks"
57. "The Gods of Easter Island"
58. "Nisapur"
59. "Moon Shame"
60. "The Tempter"
61. "Lines Written in the Realization That I Must Die"
62. "Chapter Headings"

== Reprints ==
Always Comes Evening was reprinted by Underwood-Miller in 1977 in both limited (206 copies) and trade (2,200 copies) editions. A new introduction by Glenn Lord replaced both of the introductions in the earlier edition. The order of the poems was also rearranged and one additional poem, "A Crown for a King" was added. Mecanic Books, a French publishing house, will release a reprint on January 29, 2026, in a bilingual edition (French–English). Limited to 350 copies, it is translated by François Truchaud, illustrated by Antoine Leisure, and prefaced by Patrice Louinet.
