= The Dream Snake =

Short story by Robert E. Howard

- Short story by Robert E. Howard
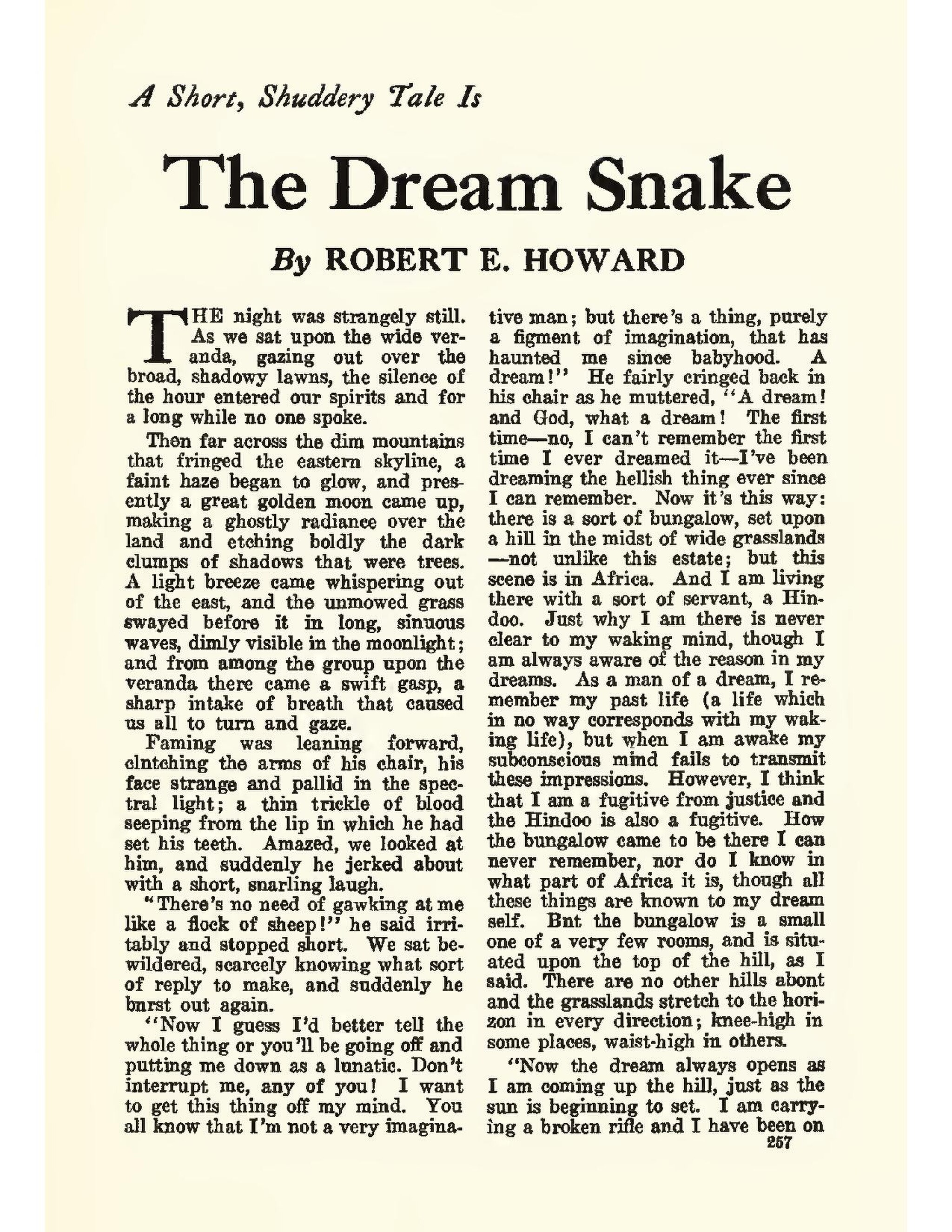

Text available at Wikisource
- Country: United States
- Language: English
- Genre: Horror short story

Publication
- Published in: Weird Tales
- Media type: Print
- Publication date: February 1928

"The Dream Snake" is a short story by Robert E. Howard, first published in the pulp magazine Weird Tales in February 1928.

== Plot summary ==
The story opens with the narrator sitting on a veranda at night-time watching the landscape. After a breeze causes the grass to sway "in long, sinuous waves", his companion Faming turns pale, gasps, and bites his lip bloody. Faming insists on telling his companions about a vivid dream that he has had intermittently since his childhood.

Faming's dream has him living in an isolated bungalow atop a hill in African grasslands with his "Hindoo" servant, with both men being fugitives for unremembered crimes. He returns from a hunting trip at sunset carrying a broken rifle to find a trail of crushed grass leading to the bungalow. The bungalow is in disarray, with no sign of the servant besides his dagger lying on the floor. Remembering the trail, Faming surmises that the servant has been taken by a giant snake. He initially resolves to flee to the coast, but then changes his mind upon realising that the sun has set, deciding to wait until morning.

During the night, Faming bolts the bungalow's doors and windows and stands in the centre of the room, listening for the giant snake. Upon the morning, he finds himself unable to leave for fear of encountering the snake without a functioning weapon, and once again barricades himself in the bungalow overnight. During the second night, Faming hears the snake outside the bungalow, and sees the door bulge as the weight of the snake presses against it. He remains awake all night, constantly listening to the movements of the snake. Within the dream, Faming believes that, should he see the snake peer in the window, he will be driven insane.

Upon daybreak, the noise of the snake recedes, and Faming - now white haired - leaves the bungalow to see its trail leading in the opposite direction from the coast. Faming runs across the grasslands towards the coast "with superhuman effort, spurred on by the horror behind me", but realises he will not gain the hills he is making for before sundown. Upon sunset, Faming looks behind him to see the grass moving "in a narrow, sinuous line—far away, but nearing every instant".

Faming explains to his companions that he always awakens at this point of the dream, but that each time the snake has drawn closer. He begins to speculate as to what will happen when the snake finally reaches him, but then stops and enters the house. During the night, the narrator hears manic laughter, then a scream. He rushes to Faming's room, finding him dead on the floor; his body is unmarked, but his face is "terribly distorted; as the face of a man who had been crushed by some superhuman force—such as some gigantic snake".

== Publication ==
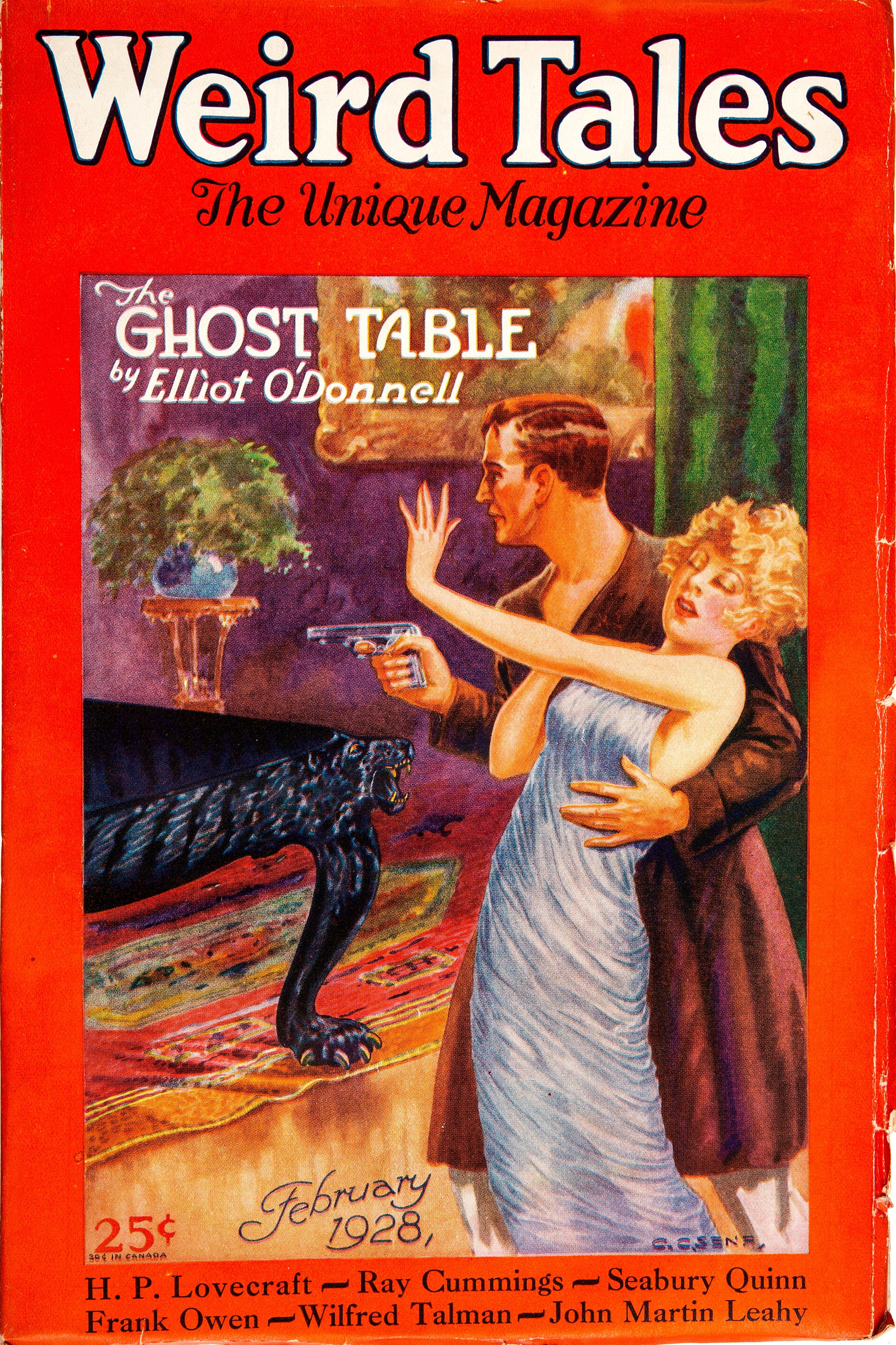
The front cover of volume 11, number two of Weird Tales, in which "The Dream Snake" was first published in February 1928

"The Dream Snake" was reportedly inspired by a dream Howard had. It was first published in volume 11, number two of Weird Tales in February 1928. Howard was paid $20 (equivalent to $375 in 2025) for the work. The story has been collected and anthologised many times, including in The Dark Man and Others in 1963. Dennis Rickard speculates that Howard's story "The Cobra in the Dream" is a reworking of "The Dream Snake".

In 1999, a comic adaptation of "The Dream Snake" by Tim Sale was published in Robert E. Howard's Myth Maker, a volume of comics based on Howard's works. The comic was later reprinted in the 2008 work The Mammoth Book of Best Horror Comics.

== Reception ==
L. Sprague de Camp, Catherine Crook de Camp, and Jane Whittington Griffin describe "The Dream Snake" as "one of Howard's least distinguished works, a simple formula piece of average acceptability".

== See also ==
- Robert E. Howard bibliography
