= Red Nails (collection) =

1977 collection of short stories and an essay by Robert E. Howard

- Cover of first edition
- Author: Robert E. Howard
- Cover artist: Ken Kelly
- Language: English
- Series: Conan the Barbarian
- Genre: Sword and sorcery
- Publisher: Berkley Books
- Publication date: 1977
- Publication place: United States
- Media type: Print (hardcover)

Red Nails is a 1977 collection of three fantasy short stories and one essay by American writer Robert E. Howard, featuring his sword and sorcery hero Conan the Barbarian. The collection was edited by Karl Edward Wagner. It was first published in hardcover by Berkley/Putnam in 1977, and in paperback by Berkley Books the same year. It was reprinted in hardcover for the Science Fiction Book Club, also in 1977, and combined with the Wagner-edited The Hour of the Dragon and The People of the Black Circle in the book club's omnibus edition The Essential Conan in 1998. The stories originally appeared in the fantasy magazine Weird Tales in the 1930s.

The pieces in Red Nails, in common with those in the other Conan volumes produced by Karl Edward Wagner for Berkley, are based on the originally published form, of the texts in preference to the edited versions appearing in the earlier Gnome Press and Lancer editions of the Conan stories. In contrast to the earlier editions, which included Conan tales by authors other than Howard, Wagner took a purist approach, including only stories by Howard, and only those thought to be in the public domain. His editorial comments dismiss editorial revisions made in the earlier editions. A 1979 review described it as "part of Wagner's effort to create an 'authorized' version of all the Conan tales".

A review in the St. Louis Dispatch primarily emphasized the "scholarly" value of the collection, writing: "Whatever Howard's literary ability (and there could certainly be some debate about that), he is surely a major figure in modern fantasy literature, which in itself makes this project worthwhile." The reviewer highlighted the story "Red Nails" as "a Conan gem — Howard at his blood-and-thundering peak."

== Contents ==
- "Foreword" by Karl Edward Wagner
- "Beyond the Black River"
- "Shadows in Zamboula"
- "Red Nails"
- "The Hyborian Age" (essay)
- "Afterword" by Karl Edward Wagner

| Preceded by The People of the Black Circle | Berkley Conan series (publication order) | Succeeded by none |
