= Hyborian Age =

Fictional period created by Robert E. Howard

An illustration of The Hyborian Age primarily based upon a map hand-drawn by Robert E. Howard in March 1932

Another version of the map, drawn by David Kyle for the 1950 Gnome Press edition of Conan the Conqueror

The Hyborian Age is a fictional period of Earth's history within the artificial mythology created by Robert E. Howard, serving as the setting for the sword and sorcery tales of Conan the Barbarian.

The word "Hyborian" is derived from the legendary northern land of the Ancient Greeks, Hyperborea, and is rendered as such in the earliest draft of Howard's essay "The Hyborian Age". Howard described the Hyborian Age taking place sometime after the sinking of Atlantis and before the beginning of recorded ancient history. Most later editors and adaptors such as L. Sprague de Camp and Roy Thomas placed the Hyborian Age around 10,000 BC. More recently, Dale Rippke proposed that the Hyborian Age should be placed further in the past, around 32,500 BC, prior to the beginning of the Last Glacial Maximum. Rippke's date, however, has since been disputed by Jeffrey Shanks, who argues for the more traditional placement at the end of the Last Glacial Maximum.

Howard had an intense love for history and historical dramas. However, at the same time, he recognized the difficulties and the time-consuming research needed in maintaining historical accuracy. By conceiving a timeless setting – a vanished age – and by carefully choosing names that resembled our history, Howard avoided the problem of historical anachronisms and the need for lengthy exposition.

== Fictional History ==
=== Cataclysmic Ancestors ===
Howard explained the origins and history of the Hyborian civilization in his essay "The Hyborian Age". The essay begins with the end of the Thurian Age (the setting for Howard's King Kull stories) and the destruction of its civilizations, Lemuria and Atlantis, by a geological cataclysm.

After this cataclysm, the surviving humans were reduced to a primitive state and a technological level hardly above the Neanderthal. Several such tribes migrated to the northern areas of what was left of the Thurian continent to escape destruction. They discovered the region to be safe, but covered with snow and already inhabited by a race of vicious white-furred apes. A vicious territorial war ensued until the humans drove the apes further North, past the Arctic Circle. Believing the apes were destined to perish, the humans turned to taming their harsh new home.

=== Hyborian Ancestors ===
1500 years later, the descendants of this initial group were called "Hyborians", named for their highest ranking deity, Bori. The essay mentions that Bori had actually been a great tribal chief of their past who had undergone deification. Their oral tradition remembered him as their leader during their initial migration to the north, though the antiquity of this man had been exaggerated.

By this point, the various related but independent Hyborian tribes had spread throughout the northern regions of their area of the world. Some of them were already migrating south at a "leisurely" pace in search of new areas in which to settle. The Hyborians had yet to encounter other cultural groups, but engaged in wars against each other. Howard describes them as a powerful and warlike race with the average individual being tall, tawny-haired, and gray-eyed. Culturally, they were accomplished artists and poets. Most of the tribes still relied on hunting for their nourishment. Their southern offshoots, however, had been practicing animal husbandry of cattle for centuries.

The only exception to their long isolation from other cultural groups came due to the actions of a lone adventurer, unnamed in the essay. He had traveled past the Arctic Circle and returned with news that their old adversaries, the apes, were never annihilated. They had instead evolved into apemen and, according to his description, were by then numerous. He believed they were quickly evolving to human status and would pose a threat to the Hyborians in the future. He attempted to recruit a significant military force to campaign against them, but most Hyborians were not convinced by his tales; only a small group of foolhardy youths followed his campaign. None of them returned.

=== Beginnings of the Hyborian Age ===
With the population of the Hyborian tribes continuing to increase, the need for new lands also increased. The Hyborians expanded outside their familiar territories, beginning a new age of wanderings and conquests. For 500 years, the Hyborians spread towards the south and the west of their nameless continent.

They encountered other tribal groups for the first time in millennia. They conquered many smaller clans of various origins. The survivors of the defeated clans merged with their conquerors, passing on their racial traits to new generations of Hyborians. The mixed-blooded Hyborian tribes were in turn forced to defend their new territories from pure-blooded Hyborian tribes which followed the same paths of migration. Often, the new invaders would wipe away the defenders before absorbing them, resulting in a tangled web of Hyborian tribes and nations with varying ancestral elements within their bloodlines.

The first organized Hyborian kingdom to emerge was Hyperborea. The tribe that established it entered their Neolithic age by learning to erect buildings in stone, largely for fortification. These nomads lived in tents made out of the hides of horses, but soon abandoned them in favor of their crude but durable stone houses. They permanently settled in fortified settlements and developed cyclopean masonry to further fortify their defensive walls.

The Hyperboreans were by then the most advanced of the Hyborian tribes and set out to expand their kingdom by attacking their backward neighbors. Tribes who defended their territories lost them and were forced to migrate elsewhere. Others fled the path of Hyperborean expansion before ever engaging them in war. Meanwhile, the apemen of the Arctic Circle emerged as a new race of light-haired and tall humans. They started their own migration to the south, displacing the northernmost of the Hyborian tribes.

=== Rulers of the West ===
For the next thousand years, the warlike Hyborian nations advanced to become the rulers of the western areas of the nameless continent. They encountered the Picts and forced them back to the western wastelands, which would come to be known as the "Pictish Wilderness". Following the example of their Hyperborean cousins, other Hyborians migrated Southward and created their own kingdoms.

The southernmost of the early kingdoms was Koth, which was established north of the lands of Shem and soon started extending its cultural influence over the southern shepherds. Just south of the Pictish Wilderness was the fertile valley known as "Zing". The wandering Hyborian tribe which conquered it found other people already settled there. They included a nameless farming nation related to the people of the Shem and a warlike Pictish tribe who had previously conquered them. They established the kingdom of Zingara and absorbed the defeated elements into their tribe. Hyborians, Picts, and the unnamed kin of the Shemites would merge into a nation calling themselves Zingarans.

On the other hand, at the north of the continent, the fair-haired invaders from the Arctic Circle had grown in numbers and power. They continued their expansion south while in turn displacing defeated Hyborians to the south. Even Hyperborea was conquered by one of these barbarian tribes. But the conquerors here decided to maintain the kingdom with its old name, merged with the defeated Hyperboreans and adopted elements of Hyborian culture. The continuing wars and migrations would keep the state of the other areas of the continent for another five hundred years.

== The World ==
A larger map of Earth in Robert E. Howard's Hyborian Age. Note that referring to the continent itself as "Hyboria" is a misapplication of the term.

The Hyborian Age was devised by author Robert E. Howard as the post-Atlantean setting of his Conan the Cimmerian stories, designed to fit in with Howard's previous and lesser known tales of Kull, which were set in the Thurian Age at the time of Atlantis. The name "Hyborian" is a contraction of the Greek concept of the land of "Hyperborea", literally "Beyond the North Wind". This was a mythical place far to the north that was not cold and where things did not age.

Howard's Hyborian epoch, described in his essay The Hyborian Age, is a mythical time before any civilization known to anthropologists. Its setting is prehistoric Europe and North Africa (with occasional references to Asia and other continents).

On a map Howard drew conceptualizing the Hyborian Age, his vision of the Mediterranean Sea is dry. The Nile, which he renamed the River Styx, takes a westward turn at right angles just beyond the Nile Delta, plowing through the mountains so as to be able to reach the Straits of Gibraltar. Although his Black Sea is also dry, his Caspian Sea, which he renames the Vilayet Sea, extends northward to reach the Arctic Ocean, so as to provide a barrier to encapsulate the settings of his stories. Not only are his Baltic Sea and English Channel dry, but most of the North Sea and a vast region to the west, easily including Ireland, are, too. Meanwhile, the west coast of Africa on his map lies beneath the sea.

=== Nations and landmarks ===
In his fantasy setting of the Hyborian Age, Howard created imaginary kingdoms to which he gave names inspired by or adapted from a variety of mythological and historical sources. Khitai is his version of China, lying far to the east; Corinthia is his name for a Hellenistic civilization, a name derived from the city of Corinth and reminiscent of the imperial fief of Carinthia in the Middle Ages. Howard imagines the Hyborian Picts occupying a large area in the northwest. The probable intended analogues are listed below; notice that the analogues are sometimes very generalized, and are portrayed by non-historical stereotypes. Most of these correspondences are drawn from "Hyborian Names", an appendix featured in Conan the Swordsman by L. Sprague de Camp and Lin Carter.

Kingdom, region, or ethnic group	Possible analogue(s)
Acheron	A fallen kingdom corresponding to the Roman Empire. Its territory covered Aquilonia, Nemedia, and Argos. In Greek mythology, Acheron was one of the four rivers of Hades (cf. "Stygia"). Acheron was a priest-monarchy ruled by priest-kings who performed human sacrifice with their own hands.
Afghulistan	Afghanistan. Afghulistan (sometimes "Ghulistan") is the common name for the habitat of different tribes in the Himelian Mountains. The name itself is a mixture of the historical names of Gulistan and Afghanistan.
Alkmeenon	Delphi. Its name derives from the Alcmaeonidae, who funded construction the Temple of Apollo in Delphi, from which the oracle operated. Also, Alcmene is the mother of Hercules. After death, she traveled into Hades and married Rhadamanthys, a chief judge of the underworld. (Note: A princess named Yelaya, who presumably becomes a consort for the lord of the underworld, plays an important role in this story. Yelalla is the name of a series of rapids and water falls in the Congo, roughly where the story takes place. In the philistine (Pelishtia) city of Ekron, there was an important oracle of Baal-Zevul (Beelzebuul). This may also have inspired the role of Bit-Yakin in the story.)
Amazon	Mentioned in Robert E. Howard's Hyborian Age essay, the kingdom of the Amazons refers to various legends of Greek Amazons, or more specifically to the Dahomey Amazons. In classical legend, Amazonia is a nation of warrior women in Asia Minor and North Africa. The legend may be based upon the Sarmatians, a nomadic Iranian tribe of the Kuban, whose women were required to slay an enemy before they could marry.
Aquilonia	Influenced by medieval Western Europe and elements of Colonial North America. The name is borrowed from Aquilonia, a city of Southern Italy, between modern Venosa and Benevento. It is also an ancient name for Quimper and resembles that of Aquitaine, a French region ruled by England for a long portion of the Middle Ages. The name is derived from Latin aquilo(n–), "north wind". Aquila also means "eagle" in Latin.
Argos	Various seafaring traders of the Mediterranean, with islands such as Crete, Sardinia, and Sicily being examples. The name comes from the Argo, ship of the Argonauts; or perhaps from the city of Argos, Peloponnesos, reputedly the oldest city in Greece, situated at the head of the Gulf of Argolis near modern Nafplion. Also, hints of Italy in regards to the indigenous population's appearance, names and culture. (Note: Howard labels the populace of his Argos as "Argosseans", whereas the folk of the historical Argos are known as "Argives".) In Hyborian Age cartography, Argos takes on the shape of a "shoe" in its border boundaries as compared to Italy appearing as a "boot". The coastal city of Messantia/Massantia derives its name from Messina, a city in northeastern Sicily.
Asgard (Aesgaard in comics)	Dark Age Scandinavia. Ásgard is the home of the Æsir in Norse mythology. Howard states that the Baltic Sea would, post-cataclysm, divide his fictional Asgard into the modern Norway, Sweden, and Denmark according to The Hyborian Age essay.
Barachan Islands	The Caribbean Islands. Possibly after the Islas Borrachas ("Drunken Isles"). The pirate town of Tortage takes its name from Tortuga.
Border kingdoms	Geographically located over the modern German Baltic Sea coast. A lawless region full of brigands and semi-barbaric peoples. Conan once traveled through the border kingdoms on his way to Nemedia. The low countries, baltic, and the borderlands of Scotland and England could be similar examples.
Bossonian Marches	Wales, with an overlay of colonial North America. Possibly from Bossiney, a former parliamentary borough in Cornwall, South West England, which included Tintagel Castle, connected with the Matter of Britain.
Brythunia	The continental homelands of the Angles and Saxons who invaded Great Britain, which is the origin of the name, though it is implied the Brythunians of the Hyborian age are a different group that could be related to early Slavs. Semantically, the name Brythunia is from the Welsh Brython, "Briton", derived from the same root as the Latin Brito, Britannia, although Howard stated that the name was kept by the Æsir and Nemedians who settled there, further implying that the Brythunians are not Germanic or Celtic. The land is depicted geographically over modern Poland, Lithuania, and Latvia.
Cimmeria	Howard states in The Hyborian Age that "the Gaels, ancestors of the Irish and Highland Scots, descended from pure-blooded Cimmerian clans." He correlates Cimmeria with the Cymric people, Cimbri, Gimirrai, Scythians, Cimmerians, and the Crimea. Geographically located over modern Ireland, Scotland, Wales and England. (Note: According to Robert E. Howard's essay "The Hyborian Age", Cimmeria partially sinks during the cataclysm which marks the end of the said Hyborian Age, surrounded by what would be the North Sea, with its mountain-tops remaining above water as the British Isles.) The name is derived from the Greek legends of a northern people, who lived in perpetual mist and darkness near the Land of the Dead.
Conajohara (Aquilonia)	The name may have been based on Canajoharie.
Corinthia	Ancient Greece, specifically Macedon based on its geography. From Corinth (Korinthos), a rich city in Classical Greece. Possibly suggested to Howard by the Epistles to the Corinthians, or by the region of Carinthia. It's a mountainous country located east of Koth.
Darfar	Howard derived this name from the region of Darfur, Sudan, in North-Central Africa. Darfur is an Arabic language name meaning "abode (dar) of the Fur", the dominant people of the area. (Note: In changing the name to Darfar, Howard unwittingly changed the Arabic meaning to "the abode of mice".) The original Darfur is now the westernmost part of the Republic of the Sudan.
Gunderland	Possibly from Gunderland of Hesbaye, a count in the Merovingian court, or from Gelderland a province in the Netherlands or from Gunther (Gundicar), King of Burgundy or Gunderic, King of the Vandals.
Hyperborea	Finland, Russia, and the Baltic countries. Hyperborea) is a land in the "outermost north" according to Greek historian Herodotus. Howard describes his Hyperborea as the first Hyborian kingdom, "which had its beginning in a crude fortress of boulders heaped to repel tribal attack". Possible Scythian influences
Hyrkania	The Eurasian Steppe, specifically the Turco-Mongol peoples, whom Howard names as their descendants in his Hyborian age essay. Hyrkania, in classical geography, was a region southeast of the Caspian Sea or Hyrkanian Sea corresponding to the Iranian provinces of Golestan, Mazandaran, and Gilan. The name is Greek for the Old Persian Varkana, one of the Achaemenid Empire satrapies, and survives in the name of the river Gorgan. The original meaning may have been "wolf land". In Iranian legend, Hyrkania is remarkable for its wizards, demons, wolves, spirits, witches, and vampires.
Iranistan	An eastern land corresponding with modern Iran. Historically, the name of the country is derived from Iran + the Persian suffix -istan, -estan 'country'.
Kambuja/Kambulja	The original name of Cambodia, also known as Kampuchea.
Keshan	The name comes from the "Kesh", the Egyptian name for Nubia.
Khauran	The name perhaps derives from the Hauran region of Syria, though its position would place it near Macedonia, with Cretan influences. Apparently, Salome in the New Testament is a descendant of this royal house.
Khitai	China. The name is derived from the Khitan Empire (Chinese 遼朝 Liáo cháo or the Liao dynasty) and the people who ruled northern and northeastern China. The name is derived from the Khitan language for The Khitan Empire, Mos diau-d kitai huldʒi gur; in modern Mandarin Chinese, 契丹國 or Qìdān guó. (Note: Khita is also the origin of the Russian name for China, "Kitai" (Китай), which is related to the English word "Cathay" and Marco Polo's Cathay (/kæˈθeɪ/).) In the Hyborian age, Khitai is an ancient empire which is always at war with Kambuja to the south. In ancient times, Khitai was subjugated by an empire of conquerors from a mysterious continent in the eastern ocean, perhaps ancient Mu in the days of king Kull. After the cataclysm, this empire made slaves of the Lemurians who fled the destruction. With time, the Lemurian slaves, and perhaps the gentile Khitanians, were able to rise up and overthrow this empire. (Note: Perhaps Vendhya had something to do with this?) The remnants of this white-skinned master race fled westwards, conquering the kingdom of the serpent men and founding Stygia. The people of Khitai are yellow-skinned and of medium height. Khitai is ruled by a God-Emperor whose decisions are greatly influenced by the Scarlet Circle, a clan of some of the most powerful mage lords in all of Hyboria. Khitan laws flow from the overlord of a city-state. The culture of Khitai is similar to that of ancient China. The most prominent feature of Khitai is its Great Wall (similar to the Great Wall of China), which protects it from foreign invasions from the north. The cities of Khitai are Ruo-Chen, Shu-Chen, Shaulum, and the capital, Paikang, which contains the Jade Citadel, from which the God-Emperor rules over all of Khitai. See also Catai.
Khoraja	Constantinople and Sicily. Its position places it as the crossroads between the Hyborian kingdoms and the Shemites. The name itself was inspired by the references of Sax Rohmer to the fictional city of Khorassa in the novel The Mask of Fu Manchu.
Kosala	From the ancient Indo-Aryan kingdom of Kosala, corresponding roughly in area with the region of Oudh.
Kozaki	Semi-barbaric steppe-dwelling raiders analogous to the Cossacks.
Koth	From the ancient Italic peoples. The Kothian capital of Khorshemish corresponds with Carchemish, capital of a Neo-Hittite kingdom. Perhaps from The Sign of Koth in The Dream-Quest of Unknown Kadath by H. P. Lovecraft. (Note: There is a town called Koth in Gujarat, India, but the connection is doubtful.) Howard also used the same name in his interplanetary novel Almuric.
Kusan	Probably from the Kushan Empire.
Kush	From the kingdom of Kush, Nubia.
Meru	Tibet. In Hindu mythology, Meru is the sacred mountain upon which the gods dwell. NOTE: Meru is not one of Howard's original Hyborian Age countries, and was created by L. Sprague de Camp and Lin Carter for "The City of Skulls".
Nemedia	A cross between the Holy Roman Empire and Byzantium. Nemedia is the rival of Aquilonia, and depended on Aesir mercenaries for their defence (as the Byzantine Empire hired Vikings as the Varangian Guard). The name comes from Nemed, leader of colonists from Scythia to Ireland in Irish mythology. (Note: Perhaps the name Nemedia is also meant to allude to Nemea, home to the Nemean Lion of Greek mythology. The name may also be suggestive of various names for Germany in Slavic languages, e.g. Czech Německo.) Significantly, nearly all Central European exonyms for the land of Germany, are very similar to Nemedia: i.e. Germany is Německo in the Czech Republic and Slovakia; Niemcy in Poland; Németország in Hungary; Nimechchyna in Ukraine, etc. etc., all apparently derived from some variant of Nemi a Slavic root word meaning: mute or unintelligible.
Ophir	The Etruscans, an ancient people also stereotyped for their wealth and decadence. Howard saw it as situated somewhere in Italy, namely in the North. When the borders of Ophir, are combined with the shoe-shaped maritime nation of Argos, to the Southeast, the two nations form roughly the shape of Italy's Boot. References to a mysterious ancient nation, Ophir, and its famous gold appear repeatedly in The Bible.
Pelishtia	Philistines (P'lishtim in Hebrew). The Pelishti city of Asgalun derives its name from Ascalon. The Pelisti god Pteor or Baal-Pteor derives his name from the Moabite Baal-Peor.
Pictish Wilderness	Pre-Columbian America, with an overlay of North America during the European colonization of the Americas, possibly even colonial-era New York. Howard bestows names from the Iroquoi language on many of his Hyborian-Age Picts (but not the quasi-historical Picts featuring Bran Mak Morn). (Note: Note that the name "Pict" comes from the Latin language term for "painted one", which could be applicable to a number of the Indigenous peoples of the Americas. The historical termed Picts were a confederation of Celtic tribes in central and northern Scotland which bordered Roman Britain.)
Poitain	A combination of Poitou and Aquitaine, two regions in western and southwestern France respectively. From the 10th to the mid-12th century, the counts of Poitou were also the dukes of Aquitaine.
Punt	The Land of Punt on the Horn of Africa. A place in which the ancient Egyptians traded with, probably Somalia.
Shem	Mesopotamia, Syria, Israel, Palestine, and Arabia. In the Bible, Shem is Noah's eldest son, the ancestor of the Hebrews, Arabs and Assyrians; hence, the modern "Semite" and Semitic languages (via Greek Sem), used properly to designate the family of languages spoken by these peoples.
Stygia	Egypt and Ancient Libya. The name derives from the Styx, a river of the underworld in Greek mythology. In earlier times the territory of Stygia included Shem, Ophir, Corinthia, and part of Koth. Stygia is ruled by a theocracy of sorcerer-kings.The high-nobility with the royal house are pure-blooded white-skinned descendants of the conquerors. The people are brown-skinned and worship the serpent deity Set. Stygia's terrain is a mix of mountains, deserts, and marshes. The River Styx flows through Stygia into the sea; the map provided makes clear that the Styx is the Nile, but since the Mediterranean did not yet exist, it had a very long additional westward bend, following what is now the coast of North Africa, until finally emptying into the Atlantic. The down-trodden multi-ethnical commoners of Stygia may still, in spirit, be the original human slaves or slave races of the serpent men who ruled this kingdom centuries before.
Turan	Persian name for Turkestan. A Turkish land, possibly referring to the Turko-Persian dynasties of the Seljuks, the Timurids, or the Ottomans. The name derives from Turan, the areas of Eurasia occupied by speakers of Ural–Altaic languages. The names of the various Turanian cities (e.g. Aghrapur, Sultanapur, Shahpur) are often in Persian language. King Yezdigerd is named after Yazdegerd III, ruler of the Sassanid Empire. (Note: The name of King Yildiz means star in the Turkish language.) The city of Khawarizm takes its name from Khwarezm, and Khorusun from Khorasan.
Uttara Kuru	From the medieval Uttara Kuru kingdom in the north and central reaches of Pakistan. NOTE: Uttara Kuru is not one of Howard's original Hyborian Age countries, it appears in Conan the Avenger by Björn Nyberg.
Vanaheim	Dark Age Scandinavia. Vanaheim is the home of the Vanir in Norse mythology. The red-haired vanir will finally oust the evil aristocracy of Stygia and found pharaonic Egypt.
Vendhya	India (the Vindhya Range is a range of hills in central India). The name means "rent" or "ragged", i.e. having many passes. This very ancient kingdom, perhaps Kaa-u in the days of king Kull, worships the god Asura. (Note: Asura is the Indian version of Persian "Ahura", as in Ahura Mazda (father of the god Mithra).) This cult has spread westwards and is present, albeit often persecuted, in the Hyborian lands. In Aquilonia, the cult finds a protector in King Conan.
Yamatai	Japan. Probably inspired by the historical name of Yamatai. The land of Yamatai is described as "a cluster of islands east of Khitai", ruled by the "Witch Queen of Yamatai" in The Savage Sword of Conan story, herself possibly inspired by the historical shaman-queen Himiko. NOTE: Yamatai is not one of Howard's original Hyborian Age countries, but appeared in a Savage Sword of Conan comic adaptation.
Wadai (tribe)	The Wadai Empire in present-day Chad.
Wazuli (tribe)	The Waziri tribe in northwest Pakistan.
Zamora	The Romani people. The name comes from the city of Zamora, Zamora province, Castile and León, Spain, alluding to the Gitanos of Spain (see Zingara for discussion); or possibly it is based on the word "Roma". There may also be some reference to southern Italy, as Zamorians dance the tarantella in honor of their Spider-Gods (variously known as Omm and Zath). Also hints of Ancient Israel and Palestine.
Zembabwei	The Mutapa Empire. The name comes from Great Zimbabwe, a ruined fortified town in south-eastern Zimbabwe, after which the modern Republic of Zimbabwe takes its name. It was first built around the 11th century and used as the capital of the Munhumutapa empire.
Zingara	The Iberian Peninsula as a whole, with overt influences from Spain. Zingara is also Italian for "Gypsy woman"; this may mean that Howard mixed up the source names of Zingara and Zamora, with Zingara originally meant to apply to the Roma kingdom, and Zamora to the Spanish kingdom.
Zuagir (tribe)	The name is perhaps derived from a combination of Tuareg and Uyghur. Main influence is the Bedouins.
Other geographic features
Amir Jehun Pass	Takes its name from a combination of the Amu Darya river and the Gihon river (Jayhoun in Arabic), which has been identified by some with the Amu Darya. Perhaps corresponds to the Broghol Pass, which is near the headwaters of the Amu Darya in Wakhan.
Himelian Mountains	Take their name from the Himalayas, but correspond more closely with the Hindu Kush or Karakoram ranges.
Karpash Mountains	The Carpathian Mountains.
Poitanian Mountains	The Pyrenees, which are just south of the Aquitaine region of France.
River Styx	The River Styx runs northward through Stygia, following the course of the historical Nile river. Then it turns and runs westward through Shem, following the historical Mediterranean Sea, finally emptying into the western ocean. Styx, in classical mythology, is the River of the Dead and this symbolism is used in The Hour of the Dragon.
River Alimane	Alamana river, (present Spercheios) in Greece. It may also be a reference to the Alemanni.
Vilayet Sea	Geographically, the Caspian Sea. The name comes from vilayet, the term for administrative regions in the Ottoman Empire.
Zhaibar Pass	The Khyber Pass which has been the traditional borderline between Afghanistan and Pakistan.
Zaporoska River	Dnieper and/or Don and/or the Volga.

== Deities ==
The Stygian followers of Set worship their deity with human sacrifice and actively venerate serpents, and Ishtar's worshippers follow the pleasures of the flesh. In Vendhya, the followers of Asura seek truth beyond the illusions of the physical world, and the Hyborian devotees of Mitra are almost Christian in their merging of asceticism with a commitment to compassion and justice.

=== Crom ===
Crom /ˈkrɒm/ is a deity in Robert E. Howard's fantasy tales of the Hyborian Age. He is acknowledged as the chief god by the lead character Conan, and his proto-Celtic Cimmerian people.

The name Crom is probably derived from the Old Irish deity Crom Cruach or Crom Dubh.

Crom is the chief god of the Cimmerian pantheon, and he lives on a great mountain, from where he sends forth doom or death. It's considered useless to call upon Crom, because he is a gloomy and savage god who despises weaklings. However, Crom gives a man courage, free will, and the strength to fight his enemies, which the Cimmerians believe is all that is needed from him. Crom doesn't care if individuals live or die, and his name is typically only invoked as an oath or curse. He is the only member of the Cimmerian pantheon named with any regularity.

Crom is never depicted as directly intervening or otherwise explicitly causing any event in the original Conan stories by Robert E. Howard. There is little consistent evidence in his works that Crom actually exists, in contrast to the demons and highly advanced aliens appearing in "The God in the Bowl" and "The Tower of the Elephant", while the story "The Phoenix on the Sword" implies that Set is one of H. P. Lovecraft's Great Old Ones. Howard's story "Black Colossus" features a princess vocally directed by Mitra to recruit Conan as her champion, but Crom makes no such appearances.

Crom is exclusively a Cimmerian god, with other civilizations paying him little attention, and Conan swearing with Crom's name immediately identifies him as a Cimmerian.

=== Mitra ===
Mitra is a personification of good, popular amongst people of the era.

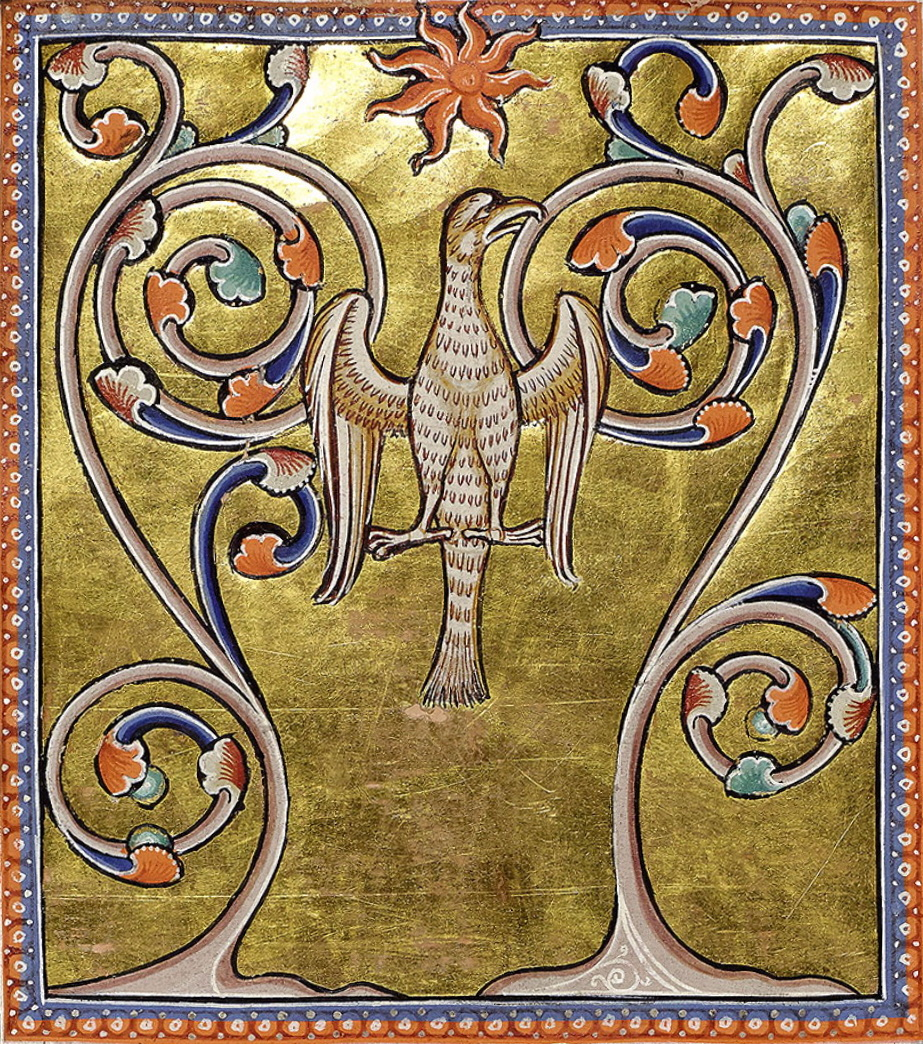
A phoenix, the symbol of Mitra, from the Aberdeen Bestiary

He is probably loosely based on the Vedic and Zoroastrian figure of the same name, and in the Hyborian universe, his worship generally represents Christianity. In the essay "The Hyborian Age", Howard writes that followers of Mitra are urged to forgive their enemies (though many of them fail to do so). Mitra's religion is missionary; its adherents are sometimes martyred trying to spread their faith onto hostile people.

Mitra's worship is dominant, effectively the state religion, in the Hyborian countries corresponding to modern Western Europe. In lands corresponding to Asia and Africa, Mitra is, at best, one god among many, and his worship is forbidden in Stygia (Egypt and North Africa).

Mitra is the chief god of most of the civilized Hyborian kingdoms, including Aquilonia, Ophir, Nemedia, Brythunia, Corinthia, and Zingara. His worshippers are monolatristic, since at least one tale depicts priests of Mitra recognizing the existence of Set. He is depicted as a "gentle" god. In Khoraja, which is on the border between the Hyborian kingdoms and the Shemite ones, the worship of Mitra was largely forgotten in favor of the Shemite gods – but in hours of great need, Khorajans still call on Mitra and are answered ("Black Colossus").

While Mitra and his followers are in general presented favorably in the Conan stories, in Howard's The Hour of the Dragon they intolerantly persecute followers of Asura. Conan, being a "barbarian", does not share this "civilized" prejudice and protects Asura's followers, who prove helpful later.

The Mitra cult never practices sacrifice and values aesthetic simplicity. Thus, his shrines are usually unadorned and feature little or no iconography except for a single idol. The idol itself has the appearance of an idealized, bearded male figure and is the primary object of worship. However, being omnipresent and incorporeal, Mitra is not considered to reside in the icon, nor share its appearance. He is also symbolically represented by a phoenix in Howard's writing, by an Ankh in the Age of Conan MMORPG, and by a bronze colossus in the survival video game Conan Exiles.

Mitra plays a central role in Howard's "Black Colossus", where a voice believed to be his speaks to Princess Yasmela of Khoraja and guides her in an hour of desperate danger. Mitra's involvement has a significant effect on Conan's career. Though he had never commanded more than a "company of cut-throats", Conan emerges as a victorious general in a historically important battle involving tens of thousands of soldiers. Though Conan's career would know many more ups and downs, this was an important step towards eventually becoming a king. From Mitra's point of view, Conan was evidently the best choice to defeat a sworn enemy of the Hyborian kingdoms.

=== Skelos ===
Skelos is mentioned in "The People of the Black Circle", "The Hour of the Dragon", and in the verse prologue to "The Pool of the Black One". He's an evil god of death who, as many before him, is connected to wisdom and learning. The Bible of maltheists and necromancers in Conan’s days is called The Book of Skelos, whose author is Vathelos the Blind.

The blind seer Tiresias in Greek mythology was strongly connected to Hades, the realm of the dead. In Homer’s Odyssey, Odysseus travels to Cimmeria, the forecourt of Hades, to confer with the shade of Tiresias.

Vatellen is the name of a volcanic mountain in reality lying where Luxor, capital of Stygia lies in the world of Conan. In "The Hour of the Dragon", Orastes resurrects Xaltotun with an incantation of Skelos, "Ancient when Atlantis sank", i.e. much older than Stygia, let alone Set-worship. The idol worshipped by the dark priest-mage Rotath in the Kull story "The Curse of the Golden Skull" seems to be a grinning skull. In this story an earlier version of The Book of Skelos is mentioned. The god of Rotath is identical with the dark nameless god worshipped by Thuron in "The Altar and the Scorpion". Skelos is one aspect of this great nameless one.

== See also ==
- Hyborian War

== Bibliography ==
- de Camp, L. Sprague; Carter, Lin; Nyberg, Björn (1978), "Hyborian Names", Conan the Swordsman, Bantam Books, ISBN 0-553-20582-X
- Falconer, Lee N. (1977), The Gazeteer of the Hyborian World of Conan, Mercer Island, Wa.: Starmont House
- Howard, Robert, E. (2002a) [1936, 1938], "The Hyborian Age", The Coming of Conan the Cimmerian, Del Rey Books, ISBN 0-345-46151-7
- Howard, Robert, E. (2002b) [1932], "The Phoenix on the Sword", The Coming of Conan the Cimmerian, Del Rey Books, ISBN 0-345-46151-7
- Louinet, Patrice (2002), "Hyborian Genesis Part I", The Coming of Conan the Cimmerian, Del Rey Books, ISBN 0-345-46151-7
- Rippke, Dale (2004), The Hyborian Heresies, Wild Cat Books, ISBN 978-1-4116-1608-0
- Shanks, Jeffrey (2011), "Theosophy and the Thurian Age: Robert E. Howard and the Works of William Scott-Elliot", The Dark Man: The Journal of Robert E. Howard Studies, vol. 6, no. 1–2, pp. 53–90
- Shanks, Jeffrey (2012), "Hyborian Age Archeology: Unearthing Historical and Anthropological Foundations", in Prida, Jonas (ed.), Conan Meets the Academy: Multidisciplinary Essays on the Enduring Barbarian, Jefferson, NC: McFarland & Co, ISBN 978-0786461523
