= Worms of the Earth (short story collection) =

- Cover of the first edition
- Author: Robert E. Howard
- Illustrator: David Ireland
- Cover artist: David Ireland
- Language: English
- Series: Bran Mak Morn
- Genre: Fantasy
- Publisher: Donald M. Grant, Publisher, Inc.
- Publication date: 1974
- Publication place: United States
- Media type: Print (hardback)
- Pages: 233 pp
- OCLC: 1369018

Worms of the Earth is a collection of fantasy short stories by Robert E. Howard. It was first published in 1974 by Donald M. Grant, Publisher, Inc. in an edition of 2,500 copies. The stories feature Howard's character Bran Mak Morn.

== Contents ==
- Foreword
- "The Lost Race"
- "Men of the Shadows"
- "Kings of the Night"
- "A Song of the Race"
- "Worms of the Earth"
- "Fragment"
- "The Dark Man"
