= Men of the Shadows =

"Men of the Shadows" is the title of a poem by American writer Robert E. Howard, published sometimes in itself and sometimes at the beginning of a 1926 story with the same title, dealing with the Pictish King Bran Mak Morn. The poem was first published in 1957 in Always Comes Evening, a collection of Howard poems.

The story was included in Bran Mak Morn, Dell Books (1969), and in Worms of the Earth, Ace Books (1979).

The poem introduces Howard's idea of the "five great sub-races": Picts, Lemurians, Atanteans, Celts, and Aryans. "[T]he building blocks for nearly all of Robert's fantasy stories... are laid out... to mix and match."

== Summary ==
Men of the Shadows consists of several very loosely connected elements.

- The poem "Men of the Shadows", in which the Picts tell of themselves and their history while taking pride in having been "The First Great Nation".
- A narrative told by a Norse warrior who took up service in a Roman Legion and gained Roman citizenship. He had been among 500 Roman soldiers who traveled north of Hadrian's Wall on a foolhardy mission known only to their commander. The commander and most of his cavalry are killed in repeated Pict ambushes. The narrative begins when thirty surviving Legionaries, of varied ethnic origins, are cornered by a horde of Picts and fight furiously. Though outnumbered, they manage to kill all their adversaries, but only five of them remain. The five try to make their way back to Roman territory, but are killed off one by one. The narrator, left alone, is captured and brought before Bran Mak Morn (in this story, still a chief rather than king). The other Picts want to kill him - being both Roman and Norse, he is twice their hereditary enemy - but Bran Mak Morn decides on sparing his life. The Pictish Wizard accuses Mak Morn of abandoning the old Pictish traditions and especially stopping their practice of human sacrifice by leaving the "Temples of the Serpent" deserted. Bran Mak Morn and the Wizard wage a mental duel, staring into each other's eyes, which Mak Morn wins. The Pictish chief introduces his captive/guest to his beautiful sister, and recounts how "a rich merchant of Corinium" had offered a thousand pieces of gold to anyone who would bring him Mak Morn's sister. The clear implication is that capturing her was the secret mission on which the 500 doomed Legionaries were involved. However, this is not pursued further.
- Following Mak Morn's victory over the Wizard, the previous story line is cut off, never to resume. The Norse legionary becomes no more than a passive witness, recounting what he heard from the Wizard. The Wizard recites several more pieces of poetry. His hostility of a few minutes before forgotten, the Wizard then strongly hails and praises Mak Morn: "Hai! A mighty one has arisen among the Western Men! Hai, hai! A chief has risen to lead the race forward!" Thereupon, the Wizard embarks on a long historical exposition, displaying a historical knowledge thousands of years back, a precise prophesy of the Fall of Rome which would occur hundreds of years in the future, and a precise worldwide geographical knowledge including the continents of North and South America. This exposition is similar in style, though very different in detail, to Howard's essay "The Hyborian Age". Both share the element of the Picts' extreme antiquity and their convoluted history. In the version presented by the Pictish Wizard, they originated in the western part of North America and gradually migrated eastwards. The Wizard concludes by prophesying "a new dawn" for the Picts - but this would be ephemeral, the decline of the Picts would resume after Bram Mak Morn's death and they would eventually make their last stand in Galloway. There, the story ends. Nothing is told of the eventual fate of the Norse/Roman narrator from the early part, nor is Mak Morn's sister mentioned again.
