= Unaussprechlichen Kulten =

Fictional arcane book

Unaussprechlichen Kulten (also known as Nameless Cults or the Black Book) is a fictional book of arcane literature in the Cthulhu Mythos. The book first appeared in Robert E. Howard's 1931 short stories "The Children of the Night" and "The Black Stone" as Nameless Cults. Like the Necronomicon, it was later mentioned in several stories by H. P. Lovecraft.

== Name ==
The book was originally called Nameless Cults by Robert E. Howard in his stories "The Children of the Night" and "The Black Stone", published in Weird Tales in 1931. It's unclear whether the book is a complete invention by Howard, or if he based it on an enhancement of a real book. H. P. Lovecraft gave it a German title more in keeping with the German name of the fictional author, von Junzt, when he started using it in stories set in the Cthulhu Mythos. Not being a German speaker, Lovecraft asked his protege August Derleth for a translation. Unaussprechlichen Kulten was Derleth's suggestion. Derleth and others in the Lovecraft circle subsequently used both the book and the author in their stories.

Unaussprechliche Kulte would be the German for "unspeakable cults". The form Unaussprechlichen Kulten is the dative case, suggesting a full title of Von Unaussprechlichen Kulten ("Of Unspeakable Cults", as it were de cultibus ineffabilibus) or similar or a dedication (i.e. (dedicated) to unspeakable cults). However, Derleth was a German speaker, and the title was also supported by German-born Weird Tales illustrator C.C. Senf, against the opposition of Weird Tales editor Farnsworth Wright and writer E. Hoffmann Price. According to Robert M. Price. "the initial [German] article 'die' must have stood in Von Junzt's original, since without it the title would read Unaussprechliche Kulten."

Since the German adjective may not only translate to "unspeakable, unutterable, ineffable", but also to "unpronounceable, tongue-twisting", the title might serve as a description of the names invented by Lovecraft. Part of Price's objection to the title, besides the grammatical issue, was this alternative meaning which he believed did not convey the required feeling of dread. He suggested instead Unnennbaren Kulten (Unnameable Cults), but was ignored.

=== Name of author ===
Howard gave the name of the author simply as "von Junzt" without ever giving his first name. In a letter to Robert Bloch, commenting on Bloch's unpublished story The Madness of Lucian Grey, Lovecraft criticizes him for giving von Junzt the first name of Conrad. Lovecraft claims that he had already named him Friedrich in a story he ghost-wrote for another author on commission. This story has never been identified. The first known appearance of the first name Friedrich is in a fake death warrant for himself that Lovecraft sent to Bloch. Bloch had used Lovecraft as a character in his story "The Shambler from the Stars". The death warrant was by way of giving Bloch permission to kill off the character. Besides von Junzt, the death warrant is also signed, amongst others, by Abdul Alhazred, the fictional author of the Necronomicon and a pseudonym of Lovecraft he used as a five-year-old. The middle name Wilhelm is also due to Lovecraft.

== Role in the Cthulhu Mythos ==
The following is a fictional account of the origin of Unaussprechlichen Kulten and its significance in the mythos.

Unaussprechlichen Kulten is believed to have been written by Friedrich Wilhelm von Junzt. The first edition of the German text (referred to by some as "The Black Book") appeared during 1839 in Düsseldorf. Fewer than a thousand copies were issued. The English edition was issued by Bridewall in London in 1845, but (being meant to sell purely based on shock-value) contained numerous misprints and was badly translated. A lavishly illustrated but heavily expurgated (a full quarter of the original material) edition was later issued in New York by Golden Goblin Press in 1909, but sold few copies as its high production costs made it prohibitively expensive. Original editions in German have a heavy leather cover and iron clasps. Few copies of the earliest edition still exist because most were burnt by their owners when word of von Junzt's gruesome demise became common knowledge. An edition is known to be kept in a locked vault at the Miskatonic University library and some book collectors/occult scholars have managed to find copies. At least one copy is known to have been present at the abandoned church on Federal Hill in Lovecraft's short story "The Haunter of the Dark".

The text contains information on cults who worship pre-human deities such as Ghatanothoa and includes hieroglyphs relating to the latter. There is also information on more recent cults including that of Bran Mak Morn, or "The Dark Man." It is from this work that the tale of the doomed heretic T'yog is most commonly sourced. The principal obscurity of the book is von Junzt's use of the word keys—"a phrase used many times by him, in various relations"—in connection with certain items and locations, such as the Black Stone and the Temple of the Toad (possibly associated with Tsathoggua) in Honduras.

== In popular culture ==
In F. Paul Wilson's 1981 novel The Keep, Captain Klaus Woermann reads an excerpt from the Unaussprechlichen Kulten and finds it a disturbing experience. However, the text doesn't appear to be the same absolute forerunner of doom as the Necronomicon.

The 2009 novel Triumff by Dan Abnett features a page of the Unaussprechlichen Kulten, shown to the titular hero as a test to see if he has ever studied Goetia. It induces instinctive nausea in those never previously exposed to pure Lore.

In the 2013 novel The Kindred of Darkness by Barbara Hambly the book is among the volumes in poor condition offered, presumably at very low prices, on a table outside the door of a used book dealer in London.

In a trilogy the Cthulhu Casebooks the first book, Sherlock Homes and the Shadwell Shadows by James Lovegrove the book is mentioned in the research that Sherlock and Watson undertake.

"Von Unaussprechlichen Kulten" is the title of a song by death metal band Nile from their 2005 album Annihilation of the Wicked.

There is a reference to Unaussprechlichen Kulten in the 1992 PC game, Alone in the Dark. There is also a reference to the book, along with one to the Necronomicon, in the 2015 video game Wolfenstein: The Old Blood.

A death metal band from Chile adopted the name Unaussprechlichen Kulten. Their lyrics are inspired by the works of H. P. Lovecraft.
