= Conan the Avenger =

1968 paperback book

- Cover of first edition
- Author: Robert E. Howard, Björn Nyberg and L. Sprague de Camp
- Cover artist: Frank Frazetta
- Language: English
- Series: Conan the Barbarian
- Genre: Sword and sorcery
- Publisher: Lancer Books
- Publication date: 1968
- Publication place: United States
- Media type: Print (paperback)
- Pages: 192 pp
- Preceded by: Conan the Conqueror
- Followed by: Conan of Aquilonia

Conan the Avenger is a 1968 collection of two fantasy works written by Björn Nyberg, Robert E. Howard and L. Sprague de Camp featuring Robert E. Howard's sword and sorcery hero Conan the Barbarian. It was first published in paperback by Lancer Books, and has been reprinted a number of times since by various publishers. It has also been translated into Japanese, German, Spanish and Czech.

== Contents ==
- "Introduction", by L. Sprague de Camp
- The Return of Conan (Björn Nyberg and L. Sprague de Camp)
- "The Hyborian Age, Part 2" (Robert E. Howard)

== The Return of Conan ==
In the kingdom of Aquilonia, a year of peace for King Conan and his new queen Zenobia is broken when the latter is abducted by a demon. Conan learns from the wizard Pelias of Koth that the eastern sorcerer Yah Chieng of Khitai is responsible, and begins a quest to recover her, little realizing that the fate of the world as well as Aquilonia rests on the outcome of the contest.

Chronologically, The Return of Conan falls between Howard's novel The Hour of the Dragon (also known as Conan the Conqueror), and the four short stories collected as Conan of Aquilonia.

== The Hyborian Age, Part 2 ==
The second part of Howard's essay detailing the pseudohistorical prehistory in which the Conan stories are set describes the period from Conan's day through the end of Hyborian era and beyond.

Preceded by Conan the Conqueror	Lancer/Ace Conan series Conan the Avenger	Succeeded by Conan of Aquilonia
