= Matthew Stover =

American genre writer (born 1962)

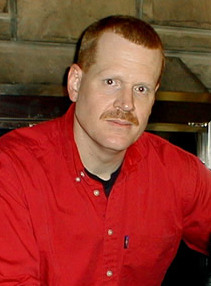
- Self-portrait, 2009
- Born: Matthew Woodring Stover; January 29, 1962 (age 64); United States
- Education: Drake University
- Occupation: Novelist
- Writing career
- Genres: Science fiction, Fantasy

Matthew Woodring Stover (born January 29, 1962) is an American fantasy and science fiction novelist. He is most well known for his four Star Wars novels, including the novelization of Star Wars: Episode III – Revenge of the Sith. He has also written several fantasy novels, including Iron Dawn and Jericho Moon. He has written four science-fiction/fantasy hybrid stories featuring a hero named Caine: Heroes Die, Blade of Tyshalle, and Caine Black Knife, with the most recent, Caine's Law, released April 4, 2012.

== Biography ==
Stover attended Danville High School in Danville, Illinois, and graduated in 1979. He then graduated in 1983 from Drake University, and settled in Chicago for many years, before relocating to St. Petersburg, Florida. He is an avid martial artist and a student of the Degerberg Blend, a Jeet Kune Do concept that mixes approximately twenty-five different fighting arts from around the world. This combat style influences the way Stover writes his fight scenes, for which he has won considerable acclaim.

He is also the founder and self-described "international grandmaster" of a parodic self-defense system he calls Huàn Dao ("Way of the Hedgehog"), which he has described as "self-defense for people too lazy to train and too smart to fight". He says the system was inspired by a passage from the ancient Greek soldier-poet Archilochus: "The fox is swift and clever and knows many tricks, yet still he is taken by the hounds. The hedgehog is slow and dull, and knows only one trick -- but it is a very good trick." He sometimes refers to Huan Dao as "Fatmattjitsu".

His non-Star Wars novels have garnered a smaller but loyal audience, primarily for the Acts of Caine cycle. As for future Star Wars novels, Stover has said that he would be interested in writing the final adventure of the heroic trio of Luke Skywalker, Han Solo and Princess Leia.

== Works ==
=== Barra the Pict ===
- Iron Dawn (May 1997) ISBN 0-451-45590-8, (April 1998) ISBN 0-451-45589-4
- Jericho Moon (April 1998) ISBN 0-451-45678-5, (Sept. 1999) ISBN 0-451-45758-7
- Heart of Bronze (1998 SFBC omnibus Iron Dawn and Jericho Moon) ISBN 1-56865-741-2

In January 2011, fsand.com released e-book versions of both novels. The e-books were slightly revised by Stover to restore some material cut by the original publisher.

=== The Acts of Caine ===
- Heroes Die (Act of Violence) (1997)
- Blade of Tyshalle (Act of War) (2001)
- Caine Black Knife (Act of Atonement, Book One) (2008)
- Caine's Law (Act of Atonement, Book Two) (April 3, 2012)

=== Star Wars ===
- Traitor (The New Jedi Order) (2002)
- Shatterpoint (A Clone Wars Novel) (2003)
- Star Wars Episode III: Revenge of the Sith (2005)
- Star Wars on Trial: Science Fiction and Fantasy Writers Debate the Most Popular Science Fiction Films of All Time (2006)
- Luke Skywalker and the Shadows of Mindor (December 2008)
- Star Wars on Trial: The Force Awakens Edition: Science Fiction and Fantasy Writers Debate the Most Popular Science Fiction Films of All Time (2015)

=== Other ===
- God of War, Stover and Robert E. Vardeman (May 2010) – continued by Vardeman alone, 2011
- Test of Metal: A Planeswalker Novel (Magic: The Gathering) (October 2010)

=== Unpublished ===
- The Real Flash Gordon (2001)

=== Short stories ===
- "Precursor" from Legends: Tales from the Eternal Archive (1999) ISBN 0-88677-823-9
- "Br'er Robert" (2001)
- "Equipment" from the Star Wars Short Story Collection (2003)
- "In the Sorrows" (2005, The Acts of Caine)
- "The Persian, the Coon, and Bullets" from the anthology Catopolis (2008) ISBN 978-0-7564-0514-4
- "South Side Whipsaw: A Brock Steele Adventure" from Conquering Science Fiction (2009)
- "The Tenebrous Way" (2011) from Star Wars Insider #130
- Suvudu Cage Match 2012
  - "Round 1: Caine versus Paksenarrion" (2012)
  - "Round 2: Caine versus Zaphod Beeblebrox" (2012)
  - "So, Conan and Elric Walk Into a Bar" (2012)
- "A Friend in Thark" from A Princess of Mars (The Annotated Edition) and New Tales of the Red Planet (2012) ISBN 978-0-9854257-0-8

=== Screenplays ===
- Terminal Kill (2011, 2012)
- Her Demise (2011)
- Knights of the Revenant (2012)
