= Caine Black Knife =

2008 novel by Matthew Stover

- 2008 cover
- Author: Matthew Woodring Stover
- Language: English
- Series: Acts of Caine
- Genre: Science fantasy
- Publisher: Del Rey
- Publication date: 2008-10-01
- Pages: 368
- ISBN: 0-345-45587-8
- OCLC: 191922659
- Preceded by: Blade of Tyshalle
- Followed by: Caine's Law

Caine Black Knife is a 2008 science fantasy novel by American writer Matthew Stover, published by the Ballantine Books division of Del Rey. It is the third book in "The Acts of Caine" series, following Heroes Die and Blade of Tyshalle. It is also subtitled as "Act of Atonement, Book One", with the follow-up Caine's Law forming the second part of the narrative. The story takes place on a futuristic Earth, with access to the parallel dimension called Overworld. After the discovery of Overworld, Actors were sent there to entertain Earth's population, by "putting their lives in danger in interesting ways". The futuristic Earth is a strictly caste-based society, while Overworld is a fantasy world of Tolkien-inspired races, such as "primals" (elves), "stonebenders" (dwarves), "ogrilloi", ogres, and trolls.

The narrative is split between two distinct timelines depicted in alternating chapters. The present day events are set three years after the Blade of Tyshalle, while the past events are set 25 yeaars prior and show the Retreat from the Boedecken, the Adventure that made Caine a star. Both events take place in the same area and involve the Black Knife Clan of ogrilloi who roam the Boedecken Waste. In Blade of Tyshalle Caine was adopted into the Black Knife Clan by the ogrillo Orbek, but the full implications of that were only hinted at. Caine Black Knife both reveals the details of Caine's history with the Black Knives and depicts the consequences of his actions.

== Plot summary ==
The novel's chapters alternate between the past and present events, which are described here in their chronological order.

In 2187 A.D. Caine, an unknown Actor in mid-twenties who never got a big break, joins a group of 40 treasure hunters searching for the legendary Tear of Panchasell. They run into a band of 300 or so ogrilloi of the Black Knife Clan. With no way to escape, Caine motivates the others to make a glorious last stand to the death, both to secure some fame for himself and to avoid torture by the Black Knives, horrific even by the standards of other ogrilloi. The band is revealed to be merely a scouting party for the entire Black Knife nation, many thousands strong. More than half of Caine's party are killed, and the rest are captured and subjected to nightmarish torture, including of a sexual nature. After spending days on a cross, Caine observes the female-only Black Knife shamans praying to their god and makes a prayer of his own, promising the god a universe of pain in exchange of being taken down from the cross. Unexpectedly, the chief shaman takes him down. Caine attacks her but is suddenly teleported back to Earth.

He learns that everyone else in his party was an actor like himself. Their death at the hands of Black Knives was meant to extract at least some entertainment value out of them, until Caine's actions made the Adventure actually interesting. Studio administrator Kollberg presents Caine with a plan of escape, but Caine forfeits both safety and his life and asks only for a chance to hurt the Black Knives in return. Teleported back, Caine begins freeing the others but then sets the pen holding the Black Knife young on fire, burning the juveniles alive. Caine destroys the Tear of Panchasell, unleashing the river that it held, which floods the Black Knife encampment, killing thousands. The surviving 3000 or so Black Knives are extremely angry, but instead of taking the other 9 survivors to safety, Caine instead leads them on a guerrilla hit-and-run campaign against the Black Knives, killing over a hundred more. Caine forces the others to consume the flesh of their slain foes — not for sustenance, but to get them to share his mindset. After more than a month, the last three survivors reach the outpost of the militant Knights of Khryl. Caine convinces them to strike at the weakened Black Knife nation, but then tricks the Knights into slaughtering all Black Knife females, thereby both ending the bloodlines and cutting off the connection the Black Knives Clan had with their god. The surviving male ogrilloi scatter into the waste to join other clans, ending the Black Knife nation, while Caine emerges as an international superstar with an audience hungry for his next Adventure.

In 2212 A.D., a god gives Caine a vision of his adopted brother Orbek in trouble, prompting Caine to return to Boedecken for the first time in twenty-five years under the alias "Dominic Shade". The river unleashed by him had transformed the Boedecken Waste into a fertile ground ruled by the Order of Khryl, with ogrilloi as a legal slave class. Caine uncovers multiple distinct agendas: Orbek, currently imprisoned and awaiting trial by combat against the Champion of Khryl, seeks to reestablish the Black Knife Clan, Caine's old acquaintance Kierendal seeks to liberate the enslaved ogrilloi, t'Passe performs research on Caine himself to further her quasi-religious philosophy, operatives of both the Ankhanan Empire and the Monasteries spy on the Khryllians, the stranded members of Earth's Overworld Company are performing mining operations, and a mysterious Smoke Hunt of unaligned ogrillioi is ravaging the area at nights.

Angvasse Khlaylock, the Champion of Khryl, God of Battle, tasks Caine with stopping the Smoke Hunt. Caine realizes that the entire Boedecken is one of the natural points of contact between Overworld and Earth. When the elves closed all such points a thousand years ago, they bound a god in Boedecken and used its power to do so. Though the Black Knives prayed to it, he was never their god, which is why it answered Caine's prayer twenty-five years ago. The Smoke Hunt allowed the god to feast on the fear and despair, allowing the Overworld Company to reopen access to Earth. Caine is ambushed, handed over to Overworld Company and taken back to Earth to face punishment for his past actions.

== Reception ==
Publishers Weekly gave the novel a somewhat mixed review saying, "Stover has a gift for brutal, detailed action sequences, and Caine is at his most enthralling when he's fighting or discussing tactics, but the high levels of (occasionally creative) profanity and the cliffhanger ending may put off some readers."
