= The Hyborian Age =

Essay by Robert E. Howard

"The Hyborian Age" is an essay by American writer Robert E. Howard pertaining to the Hyborian Age, the fictional setting of his stories about Conan the Cimmerian. It was written in the 1930s but not published during Howard's lifetime. Its purpose was to maintain consistency within his fictional setting. Howard opens the essay stating "When I began writing the Conan stories a few years ago, I prepared this 'history' of his age and the peoples of that age, in order to lend him and his sagas a greater aspect of realness."

== The essay ==
The essay sets out in detail the major events of Howard's fictional prehistory, both period before and after the time of the Conan stories. In describing the cataclysmic end of the Thurian Age, the period described in his Kull stories, Howard links both sequences of stories into one shared universe. The names he gives his various nations and peoples of the age borrow liberally from actual history and myth. The essay also sets out the racial and geographical heritage of these fictional entities, making them progenitors of modern nations. For example, Howard makes the Gaels descendants of his own Cimmerians.

In addition to its use as underpinning to his Kull and Conan stories, Howard drew on his invented prehistory in tales with later settings. For instance, "Kings of the Night" brings King Kull forward in time to fight the Roman legions, while "The Haunter of the Ring", set in the modern age, makes use of a Hyborian artifact.

== Related works ==
An unnamed Howard fragment published by Glenn Lord features two grave robbers, Allison and Brill, who discover in the Egyptian desert a structure older and different from anything they encountered before. Brill proposes that the structure is Stygian rather than Egyptian, and starts recounting the history of Stygia in nearly identical words to those used in The Hyborian Age – but making no mention of the Hyborian kingdoms to the north of Stygia. Brill's source for the information is the Unaussprechliche Kulte (also known as Nameless Cults), a fictional work of Cthulhu Mythos arcane literature, cited in other Howard stories. This historical exposition seems an earlier draft, which Howard later extended greatly and dropped the grave robbers frame story.

Howard's story "Men of the Shadows" includes a long historical narrative, similar in style to "The Hyborian Age" but different in detail. The Hour of the Dragon, the only Conan novel authored by Howard, expands upon the history of the world presented in this essay by introducing a new ancient empire called Acheron that had ruled the Hyborian kingdoms in the past.

== Related texts ==
Robert Yaple wrote a semi-historical essay entitled "Acheron – A Revisionary Theory", emulating the style of Howard's The Hyborian Age, tracing systematically the history of Acheron and integrating it within the data provided in Howard's essay.

The Hyborian Age was also the name of a fanzine published in the 1930s.

== Publication history ==
The essay has been published as follows:

- The Phantagraph (fan publication) February – November 1936 (first part of essay only – up to Conan's time)
- The Hyborian Age (Los Angeles-New York Cooperative Publications, 1938)
- Skull-Face and Others (Arkham House, 1946)
- The Coming of Conan (Gnome Press, 1953, first part of essay only)
- Conan (Lancer Books, 1967, first part of essay only)
- Conan the Avenger (Lancer Books, 1968, second part of essay only)
- Skull-Face Omnibus (Neville-Spearman [Jersey] Ltd., 1974, reprinted as 3-volume paperback, Panther Books Ltd., 1976)
- Red Nails (G.P. Putnam's Sons, 1977, also published in paperback, Berkley Books, 1977)
- The Conan Chronicles (Sphere Books, 1989, first part of essay only)
- The Conan Chronicles Volume 1: The People of the Black Circle (Millennium/Gollancz, August 2000)
- Conan of Cimmeria: Volume One (1932–1933), Wandering Star Books, London, 2003, published in the United States as The Coming of Conan the Cimmerian, New York, Ballantine/Del Rey, December 2003
- The Hyborian Age: Facsimile Edition (Skelos Press), 2015

== Adaptations ==
An illustrated adaptation was made in Savage Sword of Conan running through issues #7, #8, #12, #15, #16, #17.

== See also ==
- Devolution
- Dysgenics
