= Blade of Tyshalle =

2001 novel by Matthew Stover

- First edition cover
- Author: Matthew Stover
- Cover artist: Dave McKean
- Language: English
- Genre: Fantasy, Science fiction
- Publisher: Del Rey Books (US)
- Publication date: April 3, 2001 (US)
- Publication place: United States
- Media type: Print (Paperback)
- Pages: 736 (US paperback edition)
- ISBN: 978-0-345-42144-9 (US paperback edition), ISBN 978-0-345-42143-2 (US mass market paperback edition)
- OCLC: 45558875
- Preceded by: Heroes Die
- Followed by: Caine Black Knife

Blade of Tyshalle is a science fantasy novel by American writer Matthew Stover, the second book in the Acts of Caine series. Set seven years after the events of its predecessor Heroes Die, it focuses on Hari Michaelson/Caine and his struggles on both on future dystopian Earth and Overworld, a parallel world of magic and fantasy. In addition to Michaelson, other major point-of-view characters include Hari's academy friend Kris Hansen, the former Overworld god Tan'elKoth (Ma'elKoth after he changed his name from "I Am Limitless" to "I Was Limitless") and Raithe, a Monastic adept obsessed with killing Caine.

== Plot summary ==
The Prologue depicts young Hari Michaelson's training to become an Actor. He forms an unlikely friendship with Kris Hansen, surgically altered to play an elf, and the two help each other graduate. Exposure to Hari's world of brutal violence dissuades Kris from wanting to become an Actor, and he decides to slip away from the Studio when on Overworld.

Seven years after his victory over Ma'elKoth and the Studio, (Note: Around 2209 A.D. according to the dates given in Caine Black Knife.) Hari Michaelson's life is miserable. He is admitted into a higher caste, leads a major Studio operation, and lives in a mansion with his wife Shanna and daughter Faith. He also lacks control over his legs and bowels due to his wound, his father Duncan lost the ability to speak due to a neurodegenerative disease, and his only friend is now his former enemy Tan'elKoth, exiled on Earth and diminished. Shanna spends half of her time on Overworld as the goddess Pallas Ril, and Faith — born of Shanna's affair with Carl Shanks — only feels fully connected with her mother when she is in another universe.

The Overworld Company, the engine of the Studio's resource extraction on Overworld, comes into conflict with the natives and decides to solve it by unleashing HRVP, a bioengineered form of rabies responsible for ending the old Earth. Hansen, now Deliann Mithondionne, is the only one to recognize the symptoms and the danger. He travels to Ankhana and kidnaps an Actor to deliver a message to the Studio, which is seen by Hari. However Deliann, though immunized since childhood, still carries the disease into a major population center.

Hari urgently sends Shanna to Overworld to create an antidote with her divine powers. Seeing a chance to return home, Tan'elKoth makes a deal with the Studio to eliminate both Caine and Pallas Ril. The Studio leadership, united into a hive mind, empowers the disgraced Kollberg to lead the operation. Faith's true parentage is exposed, and her grandmother Avery Shanks takes her away due to her higher caste status. Discovery of forbidden literature leads to Duncan Michaelson's arrest and conversion into a cyborg worker. Hari is kidnapped, transported to Overworld where his legs are not working, and is given to Raithe, a young Monastic ambassador with a vendetta against Caine.

Caine is used to draw out and kill Pallas Ril; ritual runes provided by Tan'elKoth trap her consciousness in the sword. Broken, Caine is taken by Raithe to Ankhana. When Raithe touches the sword, Pallas Ril attempts to take over his body; Raithe prevails but emerges changed. Caine is put with hundreds of other prisoners awaiting execution. Among them are Deliann; t'Passe, another Monastic who views Caine as the focus of her quasi-religious philosophy; and Orbek, an ogrillo of the Black Knife Clan that Caine destroyed over 20 years prior. Caine discovers that he can use magick to power his implant, regaining the use of his legs. He forms an unexpected friendship with Orbek, who adopts Caine into the Black Knife Clan as brother. They start a revolt and take over the prison. Informed that nobody in it had HRVP, Caine realizes that his blood contains the antidote, passed to him by Pallas during her death. He has everyone drink water with his distilled blood to further spread the immunity. Raithe delivers the sword to Caine.

It is revealed that Overworld elves used to travel to Earth until they severed all points of contact one thousand years ago. Now the Blind God of humanity seeks access to Overworld through Faith, who maintains a connection to her mother. Kollberg, now a grotesque cannibalistic creature, has Faith kidnapped and subjected to violation worse than rape. Horrified by his allies, Tan'elKoth attempts to scheme but is discovered and subsumed into the Blind God's collective consciousness. Kollberg and Tan'elKoth travel to Overworld with Faith and Avery Shanks, the only one who can keep the girl stable. Tan'elKoth becomes Ma'elKoth again and uses his powers to make Earth technology function on Overworld. Flying cars with artillery and riot police with automatic weapons descend on Ankhana; Caine's allies organize resistance using magick.

Exactly seven years since his banishment, Ma'elKoth meets Caine at the exact same spot. While Ma'elKoth is monologuing 100 yards away, Caine uses the convergence of fates surrounding him to cross that space in an instant and kill him. The death of Ma'elKoth's physical body frees him from the Blind God and facilitates his Assumption to true godhood. Ma'elKoth alters Overworld physics to prevent further incursions from Earth, leaving numerous Actors and Overworld Company personnel stranded. Raithe remains the Blind God's only link to Overworld, which he must bear as penance. Avery Shanks kills Kollberg for torturing her granddaughter. Deliann becomes the new Emperor of Ankhana. Caine releases Pallas Ril's consciousness from the sword, allowing her to fully become one with the river god.

== Reception ==
The review by SFFWorld called the novel a "rare sequel that surpasses the excellence of its predecessor". The review praised the characterization and the action, and singled out the antagonist Ma'elKoth as one of science fiction's better villains, whose actions being morally ambiguous rather than clear-cut.

Fantasy Literature review described the novel as more intricate than its predecessor, with "chasm-deep philosophical and psychological themes" alongside the series' trademark action. The reviewer saw the Acts of Caine series as being fundamentally about its protagonist, and responded warmly to the older, disabled Caine.

A review on Infinity Plus praised Stover's "genuine storytelling ability" and found a number of original ideas in the novel's treatment of created realities. The reviewer, however, was unimpressed with the amount of visceral horror and graphic violence and concluded that the book was worth reading but fell short of what Stover was capable of.

Publishers Weekly credited the novel's detailed action sequences, which reflect Stover's martial-arts background, but noted that the many subplots and secondary characters made the book convoluted rather than merely complex, ranking it an "interesting near miss".
