= Jericho Moon =

Novel by Matthew Stover

- First edition (publ. Roc Books)
- Author: Matthew Stover
- Language: English
- Publisher: Roc Books
- Publication date: 1998
- Dewey Decimal: 813.54
- LC Class: PS3569.T6743 J47

Jericho Moon is a 1998 fantasy novel by American author Matthew Stover. The sequel to his first book, Iron Dawn, the story follows the adventures of three Bronze Age mercenaries who are hired to defend the city of Jerusalem from the Israelites.

== Reception ==
Library Journal says the book "puts a contemporary spin on ancient history", and that Stover's "heroes use of modern slang (much of it vulgar) adds flavor to this bawdy, distinctly irreverent look at the distant past." They pointed out the "flashy battle scenes and magical confrontations", arguing that aspect of the book will no doubt appeal to fans of sword and sorcery. Overall, they said the novel would be "a good, though ribald, addition to fantasy collections."

Publishers Weekly said that Stover "lets out the stops in this rousing sequel to last year's Iron Dawn, audaciously pitting a group of mercenaries against Yahweh, vengeful and destructive god of the Habiru, the Tribes of Israel." They complimented the narrative in the book, saying that it offers "adventure, political and religious intrigue, double crosses and valor in an unusually well-plotted tale." They point out that it is not a historical novel, but the "real-world connections will delight some readers and perhaps offend others."
