= Worms of the Earth =

- Short story by Robert E. Howard
- Country: United States
- Language: English
- Genre: Sword & Sorcery

Publication
- Published in: Weird Tales
- Media type: Pulp magazine
- Publication date: November 1932
- Series: Bran Mak Morn

"Worms of the Earth" is a short story by American fantasy fiction writer Robert E. Howard. It was originally published in the magazine Weird Tales in November 1932, then again in 1975 in a collection of Howard's short stories, Worms of the Earth. The story features one of Howard's recurring protagonists, Bran Mak Morn, a legendary king of the Picts.

== Plot ==
Bran Mak Morn, King of the Picts, vows vengeance on Titus Sulla, a Roman governor, after witnessing the crucifixion of a fellow Pict. He seeks forbidden aid from the Worms of the Earth, a race who Bran Mak Morn's ancestors banished from their kingdom in the distant past. They "might have been men in time" but over millennia of living underground they have evolved to become monstrous and semi-reptilian.

Searching for contact with these creatures, Mak Morn encounters Atla, a witch who lives in a secluded hut, shunned by her neighbours, who was born from a sexual encounter between one of the "Worms" and a human woman. The witch's price for helping him is "one night of love" which her human half craves — as men are repelled by her reptilian traits. Mak Morn, though also repelled, agrees to pay Atla's price. In exchange, she tells him of a barrow where "The Black Stone", a religious artifact of great importance to the "Worms", is hidden.

Stealing the Black Stone is highly risky — if caught by the "Worms", Bran Mak Morn would die in torment "as no man has died for long centuries". Fortunately, the barrow and the chamber deep beneath it where the Stone lies are unguarded and he manages to carry out his theft without discovery; he then hides the Stone by throwing it into a lake where the "Worms" cannot detect it. To get the Stone back, the "Worms" agree to deliver Sulla to him. This they achieve by undermining and destroying a Roman fortress known as "Trajan's Tower" before snatching the Roman governor and taking him into their tunnels. Mak Morn intended, once Sulla was delivered to him, on challenging him to a duel to the death. However, Sulla's mind is broken from his encounter with the horrific Worms of the Earth. Instead, Bran Mak Morn slays him in mercy rather than vengeance, realizing that some weapons are too foul to use, even against Rome.

== Reception ==
In a 1932 letter to August Derleth, Clark Ashton Smith, discussing the current issue of Weird Tales, stated that "Howard’s 'Worms of the Earth' seems to be the one real first-rater." In an obituary for Howard, H. P. Lovecraft said "Few readers will ever forget the hideous and compelling power of that macabre masterpiece, 'Worms of the Earth'". Robert Weinberg called "Worms of the Earth" "an effective blend of horror and adventure", and said it was one of Howard's "best works".

== Adaptation ==
A two-part comics adaptation, written by Roy Thomas and penciled and inked by Tim Conrad and Barry Windsor-Smith, was published by Marvel Comics in #16 (December 1976) and #17 (February 1977) of The Savage Sword of Conan. A trade paperback version in colour was published by Cross Plains Comics/Wandering Star in October 2000.

== Notes ==
Twice in Worms of the Earth Howard mentions the "black gods" of R'lyeh, a fictional city created by his friend and correspondent H. P. Lovecraft. Also mentioned is a water monster "Dagon", which is a historical Philistine god mentioned in a fictional context in several stories by Lovecraft. Howard had previously dealt with beings similar to the titular Worms of the Earth in an earlier short story, "The Children of the Night", set in Lovecraft's Cthulhu Mythos.
