= The Black Stone =

- Short story by Robert E. Howard
- Country: United States
- Language: English
- Genres: Lovecraftian horror, folk horror

Publication
- Published in: Weird Tales
- Publication type: Periodical
- Media type: Pulp magazine
- Publication date: November 1931
- Series: Cthulhu Mythos

"The Black Stone" is a horror short story by American writer Robert E. Howard, first published in the November 1931 issue of Weird Tales. The story introduces the character of Justin Geoffrey, a mad poet, and the fictitious book Unaussprechlichen Kulten by Friedrich von Junzt. The story is part of the Cthulhu Mythos, and follows the same pattern and has the same features as much of H. P. Lovecraft's classic work.

== Synopsis ==
The story opens with an unnamed narrator being gripped with curiosity by a brief reference to the Black Stone in the book Nameless Cults (also The Black Book) by Friedrich von Junzt. He researches the artifact but finds little further information other than the stone is of ancient and debated origins. The monolith stands near the village of Stregoicavar ("meaning something like Witch-Town") in the mountains of Hungary. There are many superstitions surrounding it, for instance anyone who sleeps nearby will suffer nightmares for the rest of their life and anyone who visits the stone on Midsummer Night will go insane and die. Though the Monolith is hated and disliked by all in the village, it is said by the innkeeper that "Any man who lay hammer or maul to it die evilly", so the villagers simply shun the stone.

The narrator decides to travel to Stregoicavar on vacation. Along the way he hears of the local history and sees the site of an old battlefield, where Count Boris Vladinoff fought the invading Suleiman the Magnificent in 1526. Local stories say that Vladinoff took shelter in a ruined castle and brought a lacquered case that had been found near the body of Selim Bahadur, "the famous Turkish scribe and historian", who had died in a recent battle. The unnamed contents of the case frightened the Count. Soon after, Turkish artillery destroyed a part of the castle and Vladinoff was buried in the rubble, where his bones still remain.

Reaching the village, the narrator interviews some of the villagers. The current inhabitants are not the original people of the village, who were wiped out by the Turkish invasion in 1526. The current inhabitants are said to have been of a different, unknown, race than the Hungarians and had a reputation for raiding nearby villages to kidnap women and children. A school teacher reveals to the narrator how, according to legend, the original name for the village was Xuthltan and the stone was worshiped by pagans at one time (although they probably did not erect it themselves). The black stone is "octagonal in shape, some sixteen feet in height and about a foot and a half thick."

A week after arriving, the narrator realizes it is Midsummer Night and makes his way to the stone. He falls asleep an hour before midnight but wakes to find the chanting and dancing people around the stone. After much dancing, during which the narrator is somehow unable to move, a baby is killed in sacrifice. Shortly a giant toad-like monster appears at the top of the stone. A second sacrifice, a young girl, is offered to the toad-beast. The narrator faints at this point and when he wakes he decides the monster and ceremony was a dream. But slowly, he realizes that events were no dream.

The narrator remembers the story of how Selim Bahadur's lacquered case was still with the Count's bones which had not been disturbed. The narrator unearths the nobleman's remains and with them, the case belonging to the Turk. He translates the account written by the historian and is horrified by his account of what happened near the Black Stone, how the monstrous creature slaughtered at least ten men before being killed by steel weapons blessed by Muhammad. He realizes he beheld the cultist worshipers' ghosts bowing before a ghost. He flings the contents of the case into a river.

== Characters ==
=== Justin Geoffrey ===
(1898–1926) A poet who wrote "The People of the Monolith" after visiting the village of Stregoicavar and died "screaming in a madhouse" five years before the events of the story. He is remembered by the villagers as acting in an odd manner, with a habit of mumbling to himself. The story opens with this stanza, which is attributed to him:

They say foul things of Old Times still lurk
In dark forgotten corners of the world.
And Gates still gape to loose, on certain nights.
Shapes pent in Hell.

Lovecraft mentions Geoffrey in "The Thing on the Doorstep", written in 1933, saying that he is a friend of Edward Derby, the protagonist of the tale. Lovecraft states in the story that Geoffrey "died screaming in a madhouse in 1926 after a visit to a sinister, ill-regarded village in Hungary". This is a detail invented by Lovecraft and not part of Howard's original story.

=== Friedrich Wilhelm von Junzt ===
(1795–1840) An eccentric German poet and philosopher noted for his extensive travels and membership in myriad secret societies. He is mainly remembered as the author of the Unaussprechlichen Kulten (Nameless Cults or The Black Book), which was published shortly before his death. Six months after his return from an expedition to Mongolia, he was found dead in a locked and bolted chamber with taloned finger marks on his throat.

Robert M. Price compares the death of Von Junzt to the demise of Abdul Alhazred, author of the Necronomicon: "[In] Lovecraft's tongue-in-cheek 'History of the Necronomicon'...he recounts the doom of Abdul Alhazred. 'He is said by Ebn Khallikan ... to have been seized by an invisible monster in broad daylight and devoured horribly before a large number of fright-frozen witnesses.' ...And 'what of the monstrous hand that strangled out his life?' In both cases, the coroner reports the cause of death as a phantom monster suspiciously like the one that rent Lovecraft himself limb-from-limb in Robert Bloch's 'The Shambler from the Stars'."

At the time of his death, von Junzt was working on a second book, the contents of which are unknown since it was burnt to ashes by his friend, the Frenchman Alexis Ladeau. Having read the book before destroying it, Ladeau afterwards slit his own throat with a razor. Von Junzt was one of the few people to have read the Greek version of the Necronomicon.

=== Narrator ===
Almost nothing is known about the story's anonymous narrator. He is very learned, with extensive knowledge of history and anthropology, and has read much on the subject of ancient religion, including obscure or bizarre authors like von Junzt. His tastes in poetry go to the obscure and weird too, such as Geoffrey.

== Reception ==
S. T. Joshi has called the story Howard's only "explicit Cthulhu Mythos story". He goes on to say that the toad-like monster in the story is likely Tsathoggua, the toad god created by Clark Ashton Smith. He cites as evidence the fact that Howard had already referenced Tsathoggua in an earlier tale, "The Children of the Night". Robert Weinberg and E. P. Berglund, in their 1973 book The Reader's Guide To The Cthulhu Mythos, stated that "The Black Stone" was "the best Mythos story not written by Lovecraft himself." L. Sprague de Camp, Catherine Crook de Camp, and Jane Whittington Griffin describe "The Black Stone" as "another of Howard's Lovecraft imitations [...] an effective story, which has been reprinted many times".

== See also ==
- Robert E. Howard bibliography

== Sources ==
- Robert E. Howard (1998) [1931]. "The Black Stone". Tales of the Cthulhu Mythos (1st ed.). New York, NY: Random House. ISBN 0-345-42204-X.
