= The Children of the Night (short story) =

- Short story by Robert E. Howard
- Country: United States
- Language: English
- Genre: Lovecraftian horror

Publication
- Published in: Weird Tales
- Media type: Pulp magazine
- Publication date: April/May 1931
- Series: John Kirowan; Cthulhu Mythos

"The Children of the Night" is a 1931 short story by Robert E. Howard, belonging to the Cthulhu Mythos. It was first published in the pulp magazine Weird Tales in the April/May 1931 issue. Howard earned $60 (equivalent to $1,270 in 2025) for this publication.

== Plot ==
The story starts with six people sitting in John Conrad's study: Conrad himself, Clemants, Professor Kirowan, Taverel, Ketrick and the narrator John O'Donnel. O'Donnel describes them all as Anglo-Saxon with the exception of Ketrick. Ketrick, although he possesses a documented pure Anglo-Saxon lineage, appears to have slightly Mongolian-looking eyes and an odd lisp that O'Donnel finds distasteful.

Initially the group discusses anthropology but begin to talk about Conrad's collection of books, which includes a copy of Von Junzt's Nameless Cults. This brings Clemants to discuss the Cult of Bran, mentioned in Nameless Cults and by his former University roommate in his sleep. The cult worships the Dark Man, an ancient king of the Picts called Bran Mak Morn. The others are skeptical but Conrad brings up a flint mallet found recently in the Welsh hills which is "obviously of no ordinary Neolithic make" – it is too small but still heavy, with odd shape and balance. While others handle the mallet, Ketrick accidentally strikes O'Donnel on the head and knocks him unconscious.

O'Donnel finds himself in earlier incarnation, when his name was Aryara and he was a member of the Sword People, one of the Aryan tribes involved in conquering Britain from the Picts. Still around are the "Children of the Night", snake-like people from whom the Picts conquered the land earlier and whom the Aryans consider vermin. O'Donnel/Aryara wakes up at a critical moment, in a forest wearing deer skins and seeing five mutilated bodies lying on the ground – and realizing to his horror that these were his companions in a hunting party, whose sleep he was supposed to safeguard. But he fell asleep himself, enabling the "Children of the Night" to sneak up and kill his friends in their sleep. Such a stain on his honour could never be removed – Aryara can never return to his people and admit his failure. The only thing left to him is to take revenge on the "Children of the Night", as much as he could. Calling on Il-marinen, this he proceeds to do - first making a berserk attack on the "Children" who had killed his friends, then following a trail back to their village where he again attacks and kills many more until being overwhelmed and killed.

O'Donnel wakes up again back in Conrad's study but still remembering his life as Aryara. On seeing Ketrick he becomes enraged, believing him to be a descendant of the Children of the Night. The others restrain him and think he has gone mad with exclamations such as "You fools, he is marked with the brand of the beast--the reptile--the vermin we exterminated centuries ago! I must crush him, stamp him out, rid the clean earth of his accursed pollution!" Ketrick leaves, but O'Donnel swears to hunt him down and kill him while, as is his habit, he is walking the moors alone at night, even if he will be hanged for it.

== The Children of the Night ==
As Aryara, O'Donnel describes the Children of the Night as:

Humans they were, of a sort, though I did not consider them so. They were short and stocky, with broad heads too large for their scrawny bodies. Their hair was snaky and stringy, their faces broad and square, with flat noses, hideously slanted eyes, a thin gash for a mouth, and pointed ears. They wore the skins of beasts, as did I, but these hides were but crudely dressed. They bore small bows and flint-tipped arrows, flint knives and cudgels. And they conversed in a speech as hideous as themselves, a hissing, reptilian speech that filled me with dread and loathing.

They are frequently described as snakes or having snake-like qualities. The Aryan legends say that the Children—none of the Aryans know what they call themselves—used to own the land in an ancient "outworn age" until they were hunted and driven underground by the Picts.

== Links to other works of fiction ==
The story clearly links into the Cthulhu Mythos. At one point, the character Tavrel notes Lovecraft's "Call of Cthulhu" as one of the "three master horror-tales" alongside Poe's "The Fall of the House of Usher" and Machen's "Black Seal". He later mentions, however, the historical existence of cults dedicated to "nameless and ghastly gods and entities as Cthulhu, Yog Sothoth, Tsathoggua, Gol-goroth, and the like". The Necronomicon is mentioned as a real book — both Conrad and Kirowan have read the Latin version. Nameless Cults is obviously real to the characters, as it is shown on Conrad's bookshelf.

The story is also clearly linked to other stories in the works of Robert E. Howard. Bran Mak Morn and the cult of The Dark Man are explicitly mentioned. The Children of the Night may, from their description, be the Serpent Men of the Kull story "The Shadow Kingdom", the "Worms" from the Bran story "Worms of the Earth", or both.

"The Black Stone" refers to a community which existed in a remote mountain region of Hungary and which practiced sinister rites involving human-sacrifice, towards which the narrator expresses a revulsion similar to that expressed to the "Children of the Night" in the present story. These are mentioned as having been totally exterminated by the Ottoman armies in 1526, an act which the narrator completely condones and considers to have been justified and necessary.

== Reception ==
L. Sprague de Camp, Catherine Crook de Camp, and Jane Whittington Griffin describe "The Children of the Night" as "perhaps the least well-conceived of all the stories Howard sold in his lifetime", suggesting that the ending of the story is "in imitation of Lovecraft's style".

== See also ==
- Robert E. Howard bibliography
