= The Return of Hastur =

The Return of Hastur is a short story by American writer August Derleth, published in 1939. The Return of Hastur is part of the Cthulhu Mythos created by Howard Phillips Lovecraft and is set in the fictional town of Arkham, Massachusetts. The story first appeared in Weird Tales issue 33 in March 1939. The story follows Haddon, a lawyer, as he becomes involved in a series of unsettling events after the death of Amos Tuttle, a reclusive collector of forbidden books in Arkham. Tasked with carrying out Tuttle’s eccentric last wishes, Haddon is drawn into a web of supernatural occurrences connected to ancient texts, strange phenomena beneath the Tuttle estate, and the disturbing fate of both Amos and his nephew Paul. As Haddon seeks to unravel the mystery surrounding the house and its connection to cosmic forces, he witnesses evidence of dangers that threaten the boundary between the mundane world and incomprehensible horrors."

== Plot ==
Haddon, a lawyer, explains that the events began with the death of Amos Tuttle, a reclusive and eccentric man who lived in an old estate near Arkham. Haddon is summoned to the Tuttle house by Amos’s doctor, Sprague, as Amos is on his deathbed. Amos instructs Haddon to ensure that his will is followed exactly, emphasizing the destruction of the estate and specific forbidden books before his heir, his nephew Paul Tuttle, can inherit. Amos also gives Haddon a rare book, the Necronomicon, and tells him it must be returned to Miskatonic University.

After Amos dies, Haddon fulfills the request to return the Necronomicon, only to learn from the director, Dr. Llanfer, that the book had been stolen decades before and replaced with a fake by Amos himself. This reveals that Amos’s obsession with forbidden lore was deeper than suspected. Subsequently, strange events begin at the Tuttle house: both Haddon and Paul hear bizarre, heavy, and unnatural underground noises while Amos’s body lies there. The corpse itself undergoes a transformation, developing an odd iridescence and scaly, inhuman features with a fish-like odor; Dr. Sprague insists on a hasty burial. Paul, now the heir, is in his late forties. He disputes the will’s clause requiring the house’s destruction, considering it madness. Haddon meets with Judge Wilton, who also regards Amos’s demands as the product of an unsound mind, so Paul takes possession of the estate despite Haddon’s unease about their decision.

Haddon returns to his practice in Boston, but later, after business brings him to Arkham, he discusses with Dr. Llanfer rumors of odd night noises around the Tuttle house and the disappearance of the Necronomicon from the Miskatonic library. The rumors center on strange footsteps or sloshing sounds, thought by at least one witness to resemble something enormous moving through mud or water. Visiting Paul at the house on Aylesbury Road, Haddon finds Paul indulging in research into the same forbidden books Amos wished destroyed. Paul reveals to Haddon that he’s uncovered unsettling information and correspondence from the Tibetan priest who sold Amos the R’lyeh Text. The letter’s cryptic line, “To afford a haven for Him Who is not to be Named,” prompts Paul to explain Amos’s commitment to provide such a haven. Paul outlines a mythology drawn from the forbidden books, featuring cosmic battles between the Elder Gods and evil entities like Cthulhu and Hastur. He suggests Amos believed Hastur was imprisoned in a region of space and had to be offered a refuge for his return.

Paul shows Haddon marginal notes in the texts, including cryptic references to modern horror stories and the Necronomicon, connecting the mythology to Innsmouth and its destruction by government forces (alluding to "The Call of Cthulhu" and Lovecraft’s Innsmouth events). Paul is obsessed by the idea that Amos’s house and possibly the land itself are involved in some larger, cosmic plot. That night, Haddon stays at the house, disturbed by Paul’s warnings of “harmless” nighttime phenomena. At night, Haddon is awakened by strange, distant, heavy vibrations and sounds that seem to grow closer, similar to what he and Paul heard after Amos’s death. The sounds now seem to emanate from below the house rather than from outside. Haddon finds Paul awake and together they descend into the basement, following the noise.

As they go deeper, the sounds intensify, accompanied by trembling, discordant noises and an overpowering fishlike stench. Putting their ears to the stone floor, they hear what seems like chanting in an unknown language, uttering names like Cthulhu and Shub-Niggurath, and realize these are not natural sounds. Paul interprets the words as meaning “Cthulhu no longer waits dreaming,” indicating that something has changed beneath the earth. Paul theorizes that the underground passage leads to the sea and thus must be inhabited by the “water beings,” like Cthulhu’s minions, especially after Innsmouth's destruction forced them to seek new lairs. Unable to sleep, they stay up discussing the forbidden texts until the dawn, at which point the noises fade as suddenly as they began.

A month later, Haddon receives a desperate note from Paul to return. On the same day, Haddon reads of a desecration at the Tuttle vault in Arkham cemetery, where Amos’s coffin is found missing and strange, massive impressions are left in the ground. The coffin turns up abandoned in a field, but the body is gone, deepening the mystery and bringing a sense of dread to Haddon. Haddon finds the Tuttle house now shrouded in darkness and Paul drastically changed—aged, heavy, and increasingly unstable in his manner. Paul urgently entrusts Haddon to deliver a packet of rare books to Miskatonic University and a letter with instructions, should Paul not contact him by 10 PM that evening. Paul admits that Amos’s body has resurfaced at the estate, left abandoned by those who “found it useless.” He hints that the underground tunnels and caverns beneath the house are full of water and perhaps inhabited by beings from the sea.

As Haddon prepares to leave, Paul is increasingly agitated, nervous, and sure that something terrible is about to happen that night. Paul claims the true haven sought by Hastur was not the house or tunnels, but the body and soul of Amos—now that both are gone, he fears he himself may be next. Haddon delivers the books and instructions to Dr. Llanfer and then confides in Judge Wilton, presenting Paul’s note: if there is no contact from Paul by 10 PM, Haddon is to detonate explosives set to destroy the house and tunnels, as Amos had originally wished. At 9:55, Haddon receives a frantic phone call from Paul, begging him to trigger the explosives immediately. Paul’s voice descends into inhuman, gibbering sounds, uttering eldritch utterances and the names “Hastur” and “Shub-Niggurath,” before the call ends abruptly.

Haddon rushes to the pasture gate, locates the detonator, and witnesses the Tuttle house in a supernatural glow. He sets off the explosives, destroying the house and collapsing the subterranean passages. Police arrive to see a chaotic scene: the ground subsides as water pours into the ruins. Out of the devastation, monstrous shapes emerge and wage a brief, terrifying struggle, illuminated by an unnatural flash of light from the sky. A massive, amorphous entity is cast out to sea while another, more humanoid but grotesquely transformed figure—Paul—emerges and then is hurled skyward.Afterwards, the area is silent; only Haddon realizes the full implications. He concludes that Amos’s body, and then Paul’s, were intended as vessels or “havens” for ancient, malevolent cosmic powers bound by dark promises and rituals. The destruction of the house and the sealing of the tunnels was the only way to interrupt this cycle, but leaves Haddon deeply shaken by his encounters with forces beyond human understanding.

== Characters ==
=== Haddon ===
Haddon is a legal practitioner based in Boston. He served as the legal representative and executor for Amos Tuttle. His involvement in the case began when he was summoned to the Tuttle estate from the Lewiston House in Arkham.

=== Amos Tuttle ===
Amos Tuttle was an elderly man who lived in increasing seclusion for twenty years on an estate located on the Aylesbury Road. He was a collector of rare and ancient books from across the world. At the time of his death, his physical form underwent changes characterized by a darkened, iridescent skin tone, the appearance of scale-like growths on his hands and face, and a lengthening of the head into a fish-like shape.

=== Paul Tuttle ===
Paul Tuttle is the nephew and sole heir of Amos Tuttle. Though he is in his late forties, he maintains the face and figure of a man in his twenties. He is tall and dark-haired with faint traces of gray in his mustache and at his temples. He has blue eyes and does not wear glasses. Professionally, he is a scholar and researcher of philology, specifically the Sac Indian language.

=== Dr. Ephraim Sprague ===
Dr. Sprague was the medical doctor who attended to Amos Tuttle during his final hours. He was present at the time of Tuttle's death and later observed the post-mortem physical changes of the body before his own death.

== View ==
In “The Return of Hastur,” August Derleth seems to have attempted to create an archetypal mythos story written to some extent under the supervision of H.P. Lovecraft, even if it does not achieve the quality of Lovecraft's specific style of expression. While the narrative contains isolated attempts to imitate Lovecraft's use of astronomical imagery, it primarily serves as a vehicle for Derleth's controversial introduction of a quasi-Paracelsian system of elemental categories. This framework imposed a structure of cosmic black and white hats on the mythos, creating a moral dichotomy that diverged from the source material.

== Bibliography ==
- Carter, Lin; Price, Robert M. (2006). The Xothic Legend Cycle. Oakland: Chaosium. ISBN 1-5688-2195-6.
- Derleth, August (1939). "The Return of Hastur". Weired Tales. Vol. XXXIII, no. 3. New York.
- Harms, Daniel; Appel, Shannon (1998). "Hastur". The Encyclopedia Cthulhiana. Oakland: Chaosium. ISBN 1-5688-2119-0.
- Shreffler, Philip A. (1977). The H.P. Lovecraft Companion. Westport: Greenwood Press.
- Wood, Andrew Paul (2023). ""A Kind of Sophisticated Astarte": On the Nature of Shub-Niggurath". Lovecraft Annual (17). JSTOR 27260620.
