= Dagon and Other Macabre Tales =

1965 short story collection by H. P. Lovecraft

- Dust-jacket illustration by Lee Brown Coye.
- Author: H. P. Lovecraft
- Cover artist: Lee Brown Coye
- Language: English
- Genre: Science fiction, Fantasy, horror
- Publisher: Arkham House
- Publication date: 1965
- Publication place: United States
- Media type: Print (hardback)
- Pages: ix, 413
- ISBN: 0-87054-039-4 (revised edition)

Dagon and Other Macabre Tales is a collection of stories by American author H. P. Lovecraft, which also includes his essay on weird fiction, "Supernatural Horror in Literature". It was originally published in 1965 by Arkham House in an edition of 3,471 copies. Unlike some other first editions of Lovecraft collections issued by Arkham House in the mid-sixties, the true first edition is bound with head- and tailbands.

The collection was revised in 1986 by S.T. Joshi, replacing the introduction by August Derleth for one by Joshi and another by T. E. D. Klein. The bulk of the tales were also reordered chronologically, while some tales were moved to appendices. It was released in an edition of 4,023 copies, designated a 'corrected 5th printing'. This revised edition was read by Gordon Gould for the American Foundation for the Blind in 1987.

== Contents ==
Dagon and Other Macabre Tales contains the following tales:

1. Introduction by August Derleth
2. "Dagon"
3. "The Tomb"
4. "Polaris"
5. "Beyond the Wall of Sleep"
6. "The Doom That Came to Sarnath"
7. "The White Ship"
8. "Arthur Jermyn"
9. "The Cats of Ulthar"
10. "Celephaïs"
11. "From Beyond"
12. "The Temple"
13. "The Tree"
14. "The Moon-Bog"
15. "The Nameless City"
16. "The Other Gods"
17. "The Quest of Iranon"
18. "Herbert West--Reanimator"
19. "The Hound"
20. "Hypnos"
21. "The Lurking Fear"
22. "The Festival"
23. "The Unnamable"
24. "Imprisoned with the Pharaohs"
25. "He"
26. "The Horror at Red Hook"
27. "The Strange High House in the Mist"
28. "In the Walls of Eryx"
29. "The Evil Clergyman"
30. "The Beast in the Cave"
31. "The Alchemist"
32. "Poetry and the Gods"
33. "The Street"
34. "The Transition of Juan Romero"
35. "Azathoth"
36. "The Descendant"
37. "The Book"
38. "The Thing in the Moonlight"
39. "Supernatural Horror in Literature"

Cover by Raymond Bayless of the 1986 corrected fifth printing of Dagon and Other Macabre Tales

== Sources ==
- Jaffery, Sheldon (1989). The Arkham House Companion. Mercer Island, WA: Starmont House, Inc. pp. 79, 139–140. ISBN 1-55742-005-X.
- Chalker, Jack L.; Mark Owings (1998). The Science-Fantasy Publishers: A Bibliographic History, 1923-1998. Westminster, MD and Baltimore: Mirage Press, Ltd. pp. 42–43, 56.
- Joshi, S.T. (1999). Sixty Years of Arkham House: A History and Bibliography. Sauk City, WI: Arkham House. pp. 90–91, 155–156. ISBN 0-87054-176-5.
- Nielsen, Leon (2004). Arkham House Books: A Collector's Guide. Jefferson, NC and London: McFarland & Company, Inc. pp. 95–96, 132–133. ISBN 0-7864-1785-4.
