= Marginalia (collection) =

Book by Howard Phillips Lovecraft

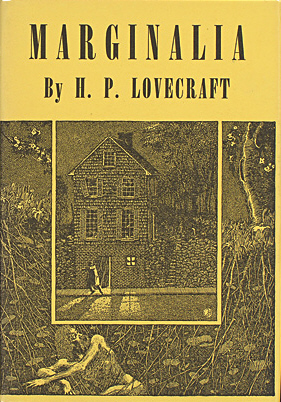
- Dust-jacket illustration by Virgil Finlay for Marginalia
- Author: H. P. Lovecraft
- Cover artist: Virgil Finlay
- Language: English
- Genre: Fantasy, Horror, Science fiction short stories, essay, biography, poetry
- Publisher: Arkham House
- Publication date: 1944
- Publication place: United States
- Media type: Print (hardback)
- Pages: x, 377 pp

Marginalia is a collection of Fantasy, Horror and Science fiction short stories, essays, biography and poetry by and about the American author H. P. Lovecraft. It was released in 1944 and was the third collection of Lovecraft's work published by Arkham House. 2,035 copies were printed.

The contents of this volume were selected by August Derleth and Donald Wandrei. The dust-jacket art is a reproduction of Virgil Finlay's illustration for Lovecraft's story "The Shunned House."

== Contents ==
Marginalia contains the following:

1. "Foreword," by August Derleth & Donald Wandrei
2. "Imprisoned with the Pharaohs" (with Harry Houdini)
3. "Medusa's Coil" (with Zealia Brown (Reed) Bishop)
4. "Winged Death" (with Hazel Heald)
5. "The Man of Stone" (with Hazel Heald)
6. "Notes on the Writing of Weird Fiction"
7. "Some Notes on Interplanetary Fiction"
8. "Lord Dunsany and His Work"
9. "Heritage or Modernism: Common Sense in Art Forms"
10. "Some Backgrounds of Fairyland"
11. "Some Causes of Self-Immolation"
12. "A Guide to Charleston, South Carolina"
13. "Observations on Several Parts of North America"
14. "The Beast in the Cave"
15. "The Transition of Juan Romero"
16. "Azathoth"
17. "The Book"
18. "The Descendant"
19. "The Very Old Folk"
20. "The Thing in the Moonlight"
21. "Two Comments"
22. "His Own Most Fantastic Creation" by Winfield Townley Scott
23. "Some Random Memories" by Frank Belknap Long
24. "H. P. Lovecraft: An Appreciation" by T. O. Mabbott
25. "The Wind That Is in the Grass: A Memoir of H. P. Lovecraft" by R. H. Barlow
26. "Lovecraft and Science" by Kenneth Sterling
27. "Lovecraft as a Formative Influence" by August Derleth
28. "The Dweller in Darkness" by Donald Wandrei
29. "To Howard Phillips Lovecraft" by Clark Ashton Smith
30. "H.P.L." by Henry Kuttner
31. "Lost Dream" by Emil Petaja
32. "To Howard Phillips Lovecraft" by Francis Flagg
33. "Elegy: In Providence the Spring ..." by August Derleth
34. "From the Outsider: H. P. Lovecraft" by Charles E. White
35. "In Memoriam: H. P. Lovecraft" by Richard Ely Morse

== Reception ==
New York Times reviewer Marjorie Farber said Marginalia "should cause intense satisfaction among the disciples of the late great Master of Necrology", commenting that Lovecraft's "whole career seems an effective protest against 'natural laws', against genuine scholarship and against literary craftsmanship". E. F. Bleiler noted that "The guest memoirs and essays are of varying interest", but that "Lovecraft's fiction is juvenile or minor. His essays are more significant". Lovecraft bibliographer Francis T. Laney described the volume as "a glorified fan magazine in book format. . . . [presenting] an unforgettable composite view of Lovecraft as a man".
