= At the Mountains of Madness and Other Novels =

1964 collection of stories by H. P. Lovecraft

- Dust-jacket illustration by Lee Brown Coye for At the Mountains of Madness and Other Novels
- Author: H. P. Lovecraft
- Cover artist: Lee Brown Coye
- Language: English
- Genre: Science fiction, Fantasy, Horror short stories
- Publisher: Arkham House
- Publication date: 1964
- Publication place: United States
- Media type: Print (hardback)
- Pages: xi, 432 pp
- ISBN: 0-87054-038-6 (revised edition)

At the Mountains of Madness and Other Novels is a collection of stories by American author H. P. Lovecraft. It was originally published in 1964 by Arkham House in an edition of 3,552 copies. The true first edition has no head- or tailbands and features a green dustjacket (as depicted right). (Later states of the dustjacket are red and orange.)

The collection was revised and the text restored in 1985 by S. T. Joshi, replacing the introduction by August Derleth for one by Joshi and another by James Turner. The 1985 edition was published in an edition of 3,990 copies and designated a "corrected 5th printing".

== Contents ==
At the Mountains of Madness and Other Novels contains the following tales:

1. H. P. Lovecraft's Novels by August Derleth
2. At the Mountains of Madness (texts for the 1st 4 Arkham House printings ( 1964–75) were corrected by Derleth and Wandrei from the faulty original printings in Astounding Stories; however corrections were mainly based on Lovecraft's incomplete hand-written corrections in his personal copies of Astounding and the Arkham House text contained nearly 1,500 errors, mostly in spelling and punctuation, but also in the omission of two small passages towards the beginning.)
3. The Case of Charles Dexter Ward
4. "The Shunned House"
5. "The Dreams in the Witch-House"
6. "The Statement of Randolph Carter"
7. "The Dream-Quest of Unknown Kadath"
8. "The Silver Key"
9. "Through the Gates of the Silver Key"

Cover by Raymond Bayless of the 1986 corrected fifth printing of At the Mountains of Madness and Other Novels

== Reprints ==
=== Arkham House ===
- 2nd printing, 1968 - 2,987 copies.
- 3rd printing, 1971 - 3,082 copies.
- 4th printing, 1975 - 4,005 copies.
- corrected 5th printing, 1986 - 3,990 copies. (1st restored text, edited by S.T. Joshi; later printings follow this text).
- corrected 6th printing, 1987 - 4,077 copies.
- corrected 7th printing, 1991 - 4,461 copies.
- corrected 8th printing, 1997 - 3,032 copies.
- corrected 9th printing, 2001 - 2,500 copies.

=== Others ===
- London: Victor Gollancz, 1966 (of the original edition).
