= Mr. George and Other Odd Persons =

1963 collection of short stories by August Derleth

- Dust-jacket illustration by Robert E. Hubbell.
- Author: Stephen Grendon
- Cover artist: Robert E. Hubbell
- Language: English
- Genre: Fantasy, horror
- Published: 1963
- Publisher: Arkham House
- Publication place: United States
- Media type: Print (hardback)
- Pages: viii, 239

Mr. George and Other Odd Persons is a collection of fantasy and horror short stories by American author August Derleth, written under the pseudonym of Stephen Grendon. It was released in 1963 by Arkham House in an edition of 2,546 copies. Most of the stories had appeared previously in the magazine Weird Tales. Two appeared in The Arkham Sampler. The title story was dramatized for the Thriller TV series.

== Contents ==
Mr. George and Other Odd Persons contains the following tales:

- "Introduction" by August Derleth
- "Mr. George"
- "Parrington's Pool"
- "A Gentleman From Prague"
- "The Man on B-17"
- "Blessed Are the Meek"
- "Mara"
- "The Blue Spectacles"
- "Alannah"
- "Dead Man's Shoes"
- "The Tsantsa in the Parlor"
- "Balu"
- "The Extra Passenger"
- "The Wind in the Lilacs"
- "Miss Eperson"
- "The Night Train to Lost Valley"
- "Bishop's Gambit"
- "Mrs. Manifold"

== Sources ==
- Jaffery, Sheldon (1989). The Arkham House Companion. Mercer Island, WA: Starmont House, Inc. p. 68. ISBN 1-55742-005-X.
- Chalker, Jack L.; Mark Owings (1998). The Science-Fantasy Publishers: A Bibliographic History, 1923-1998. Westminster, MD and Baltimore: Mirage Press, Ltd. pp. 40–41.
- Joshi, S.T. (1999). Sixty Years of Arkham House: A History and Bibliography. Sauk City, WI: Arkham House. p. 81. ISBN 0-87054-176-5.
- Nielsen, Leon (2004). Arkham House Books: A Collector's Guide. Jefferson, NC and London: McFarland & Company, Inc. pp. 88–89. ISBN 0-7864-1785-4.
