= Dwellers in Darkness =

- Dust-jacket illustration by Frank Utpatel.
- Author: August Derleth
- Cover artist: Frank Utpatel
- Language: English
- Genre: Horror, Fantasy
- Publisher: Arkham House
- Publication date: 1976
- Publication place: United States
- Media type: Print (hardback)
- Pages: 203
- ISBN: 0-87054-074-2
- OCLC: 2155673
- Dewey Decimal: 813/.5/2
- LC Class: PZ3.D445 Dw3 PS3507.E69

Dwellers in Darkness is a collection of stories by American writer August Derleth. It was released in 1976 by Arkham House in an edition of 3,926 copies. It was the author's eighth collection of stories published by Arkham House. Two stories from Derleth's Judge Peck series are included in the collection. Also included is "Ghost Lake", the last story completed by Derleth before he died in 1971.

== Contents ==
Dwellers in Darkness contains the following tales:

- "The Ghost Walk"
- "The Ormolu Clock"
- "A Knocking in the Wall"
- "The Lost Path"
- "The Place of Desolation"
- "The Patchwork Quilt"
- "The Island Out of Space"
- "The Night Road"
- "Come to Me"
- "Memoir for Lucas Payne"
- "The Passing of Eric Holm"
- "Man in the Dark"
- "The Song of the Peewee"
- "Open, Sesame!"
- "Ghost Lake"
- "The Element of Chance"
- "Fool Proof"

== Sources ==
- Jaffery, Sheldon (1989). The Arkham House Companion. Mercer Island, WA: Starmont House, Inc. p. 116. ISBN 1-55742-005-X.
- Chalker, Jack L.; Mark Owings (1998). The Science-Fantasy Publishers: A Bibliographic History, 1923-1998. Westminster, MD and Baltimore: Mirage Press, Ltd. p. 52.
- Joshi, S.T. (1999). Sixty Years of Arkham House: A History and Bibliography. Sauk City, WI: Arkham House. pp. 139–140. ISBN 0-87054-176-5.
- Nielsen, Leon (2004). Arkham House Books: A Collector's Guide. Jefferson, NC and London: McFarland & Company, Inc. p. 122. ISBN 0-7864-1785-4.
