= Night's Yawning Peal: A Ghostly Company =

1952 anthology edited by August Derleth

- Jacket illustration by Robert Crane for Night's Yawning Peal
- Editor: August Derleth
- Cover artist: Robert Crane
- Language: English
- Genre: Fantasy, horror
- Publisher: Arkham House with Pellegrini & Cudahy
- Publication date: 1952
- Publication place: United States
- Media type: Print (hardback)
- Pages: viii, 280

Night's Yawning Peal: A Ghostly Company is an anthology of supernatural short stories edited by American writer August Derleth. It was released in 1952 by Arkham House with Pellegrini & Cudahy in an edition of 4,500 copies. The cover price on the first edition is $3.00. It is the second and last book that Arkham published with Pellegrini and Cudahy.

An abridged paperback omitting several stories was published by Signet in 1974 as Night's Yawning Peal

== Contents ==
Night's Yawning Peal: A Ghostly Company contains the following tales:

- "Foreword"
- "Mr. George" by Stephen Grendon
- "The Loved Dead" by C. M. Eddy, Jr.
- "The Sign" by Lord Dunsany
- "The La Prello Paper" by Carl Jacobi
- "The Gorge of the Churels" by H. Russell Wakefield
- "Dhoh" by Manly Wade Wellman
- "The Churchyard Yew" by J. Sheridan LeFanu
- "Technical Slip" by John Beynon Harris
- "The Man Who Collected Poe" by Robert Bloch
- "Hector" by Michael West
- "Roman Remains" by Algernon Blackwood
- "A Damsel With a Dulcimer" by Malcolm Ferguson
- "The Suppressed Edition" by Richard Curle
- "The Lonesome Place" by August Derleth
- "The Case of Charles Dexter Ward" by H. P. Lovecraft

== Sources ==
- Jaffery, Sheldon (1989). The Arkham House Companion. Mercer Island, WA: Starmont House, Inc. p. 43. ISBN 1-55742-005-X.
- Chalker, Jack L.; Mark Owings (1998). The Science-Fantasy Publishers: A Bibliographic History, 1923-1998. Westminster, MD and Baltimore: Mirage Press, Ltd. pp. 34–35.
- Joshi, S.T. (1999). Sixty Years of Arkham House: A History and Bibliography. Sauk City, WI: Arkham House. p. 59. ISBN 0-87054-176-5.
- Nielsen, Leon (2004). Arkham House Books: A Collector's Guide. Jefferson, NC and London: McFarland & Company, Inc. pp. 74–75. ISBN 0-7864-1785-4.
