= Something Near =

1945 collection of short stories by August Derleth

- Dust-jacket illustration by Ronald Clyne.
- Author: August Derleth
- Cover artist: Ronald Clyne
- Language: English
- Genre: Fantasy, horror
- Publisher: Arkham House
- Publication date: 1945
- Publication place: United States
- Media type: Print (hardback)
- Pages: 274

Something Near is a collection of fantasy and horror short stories by American writer August Derleth. It was released in 1945 and was the author's second book published by Arkham House. 2,054 copies were printed. The collection has never been reprinted.

Most of the stories had appeared earlier in the magazine Weird Tales.

== Contents ==
Something Near contains the following tales:

- "A Thin Gentleman with Gloves"
- "Mr. Ames' Devil"
- "A Wig for Miss Devore"
- "Mrs. Corter Makes Up Her Mind"
- "Pacific 421"
- "Headlines for Tod Shayne"
- "No Light for Uncle Henry"
- "Lansing's Luxury"
- "Carousel"
- "Lady Macbeth of Pimley Square"
- "Here, Daemos!"
- "McElwin's Glass"
- "An Elegy for Mr. Danielson"
- "The Satin Mask"
- "Motive"
- "The Metronome"
- "The Inverness Cape"
- "The Thing That Walked on the Wind"
- "Ithaqua"
- "Beyond the Threshold"
- "The Dweller in Darkness"

== Reception ==
E. F. Bleiler found the collection to be "Mostly routine work". Francis T. Laney recommended Something Near as "a worthy, if not outstanding, addition to the Arkham series", saying that "Derleth is a thoroughly competent craftsman, and his better efforts in the genre are well deserving of hard covers".

== Sources ==
- Jaffery, Sheldon (1989). The Arkham House Companion. Mercer Island, WA: Starmont House, Inc. pp. 10–11. ISBN 1-55742-005-X.
- Chalker, Jack L.; Mark Owings (1998). The Science-Fantasy Publishers: A Bibliographic History, 1923-1998. Westminster, MD and Baltimore: Mirage Press, Ltd. p. 28.
- Nielsen, Leon (2004). Arkham House Books: A Collector's Guide. Jefferson, NC and London: McFarland & Company, Inc. p. 54. ISBN 0-7864-1785-4.
