= Tales from the Nightside =

- Dust-jacket illustration, Nightmare in Red, by Michael Whelan.
- Author: Charles L. Grant
- Illustrator: Andrew Smith
- Cover artist: Michael Whelan
- Language: English
- Genre: Fantasy, Horror
- Publisher: Arkham House
- Publication date: 1981
- Publication place: United States
- Media type: Print (hardback)
- Pages: xii, 228
- ISBN: 0-87054-091-2
- OCLC: 7280755
- Dewey Decimal: 813/.54 19
- LC Class: PS3557.R265 T3

Tales from the Nightside is a collection of stories by American writer Charles L. Grant. It was released in 1981 and was the author's first book by Arkham House and was published in an edition of 4,121 copies. The book cover has been featured on Thrash Metal band Sepultura album Beneath the Remains.

== Contents ==
Tales from the Nightside contains the following stories:

1. "Foreword", by Stephen King
2. Tales from Oxrun Station
  - "Coin of the Realm"
  - "Old Friends"
  - "Home"
  - "If Damon Comes"
  - "A Night of Dark Intent"
3. Tales from Hawthorne Street
  - "The Gentle Passing of a Hand"
  - "When All the Children Call My Name"
  - "Needle Song"
  - "Something There Is"
4. Tales from the Nightside
  - "Come Dance With Me on My Pony's Grave"
  - "The Three of Tens"
  - "Digging"
  - "From All the Fields of Hail and Fire"
  - "The Key to English"
  - "White Wolf Calling"

== Sources ==
- Jaffery, Sheldon (1989). The Arkham House Companion. Mercer Island, WA: Starmont House, Inc. p. 126. ISBN 1-55742-005-X.
- Chalker, Jack L.; Mark Owings (1998). The Science-Fantasy Publishers: A Bibliographic History, 1923-1998. Westminster, MD and Baltimore: Mirage Press, Ltd. p. 54.
- Joshi, S.T. (1999). Sixty Years of Arkham House: A History and Bibliography. Sauk City, WI: Arkham House. p. 147. ISBN 0-87054-176-5.
- Nielsen, Leon (2004). Arkham House Books: A Collector's Guide. Jefferson, NC and London: McFarland & Company, Inc. p. 127. ISBN 0-7864-1785-4.
