= Strayers from Sheol =

- Dust-jacket illustration by Gary Gore for Strayers from Sheol
- Author: H. Russell Wakefield
- Cover artist: Gary Gore
- Language: English
- Genre: Fantasy, horror
- Publisher: Arkham House
- Publication date: 1961
- Publication place: United States
- Media type: Print (hardback)
- Pages: 186 pp

Strayers from Sheol is a collection of stories by author H. Russell Wakefield. It was released in 1961 and was the second collection of the author's stories to be published by Arkham House. It was published in an edition of 2,070 copies.

Some of the stories had appeared originally in Weird Tales, The Arkham Sampler, The Magazine of Fantasy & Science Fiction and Fantastic Universe.

== Contents ==
Strayers from Sheol contains the following tales:

1. "Introduction: Farewell to All Those!"
2. "The Triumph of Death"
3. "Ghost Hunt"
4. "The Third Shadow"
5. "The Gorge of the Churels"
6. "Mr. Ash's Studio"
7. "Woe Water"
8. "A Kink in Space-Time"
9. "Messrs. Turkes & Talbot"
10. "'Immortal Bird'"
11. "The Caretaker"
12. "'Four Eyes'"
13. "The Sepulchre of Jasper Sarasen"
14. "The Middle Drawer"
15. "Monstrous Regiment"
