= The Mask of Cthulhu =

Collection of fantasy and horror short stories

- Dust jacket illustration by Richard Taylor
- Author: August Derleth
- Cover artist: Richard Taylor
- Language: English
- Genre: Fantasy, horror
- Publisher: Arkham House
- Publication date: 1958
- Publication place: United States
- Media type: Print (hardback)
- Pages: 201

The Mask of Cthulhu is a collection of fantasy and horror short stories by American writer August Derleth. It was released in 1958 by Arkham House in an edition of 2,051 copies. It was reprinted by Beagle Books in 1971.

The stories are part of the Cthulhu Mythos and most had appeared in the magazine Weird Tales between 1939 and 1953.

== Contents ==
The Mask of Cthulhu contains the following tales:

- "Introduction"
- "The Return of Hastur"
- "The Whippoorwills in the Hills"
- "Something in Wood"
- "The Sandwin Compact"
- "The House in the Valley"
- "The Seal of R'lyeh"

== Critical reception ==
E. F. Bleiler commented the book in The Guide to Supernatural Fiction (1983): "Hasty work not up to Derleth’s better level. Derleth was never really at home in the Cthulhu cycle. There are too many digressions to the Necronomicon, the mythology of the Great Ones, [and] the events described in Lovecraft’s stories."

== Sources ==
- Jaffery, Sheldon (1989). The Arkham House Companion. Mercer Island, WA: Starmont House, Inc. p. 48. ISBN 1-55742-005-X.
- Chalker, Jack L.; Mark Owings (1998). The Science-Fantasy Publishers: A Bibliographic History, 1923-1998. Westminster, MD and Baltimore: Mirage Press, Ltd. pp. 35–36.
- Joshi, S.T. (1999). Sixty Years of Arkham House: A History and Bibliography. Sauk City, WI: Arkham House. p. 65. ISBN 0-87054-176-5.
- Nielsen, Leon (2004). Arkham House Books: A Collector's Guide. Jefferson, NC and London: McFarland & Company, Inc. p. 78. ISBN 0-7864-1785-4.
