= Beneath the Moors =

1974 novel by Brian Lumley

- Dust-jacket illustration by Herb Arnold for Beneath the Moors
- Author: Brian Lumley
- Cover artist: Herb Arnold
- Language: English
- Genre: Horror, fantasy
- Publisher: Arkham House
- Publication date: 1974
- Publication place: United Kingdom
- Media type: Print (Hardback)
- Pages: xxi, 145
- ISBN: 0-87054-066-1
- OCLC: 1136954
- Dewey Decimal: 823/.9/14
- LC Class: PZ4.L9575 Be3 PR6062.U45

Beneath the Moors is a fantasy horror novel by English writer Brian Lumley. It was published by Arkham House in 1974 in an edition of 3,842 copies. It was Lumley's second book published by Arkham House. The novel is part of the Cthulhu Mythos.

The short novel incorporates the short story "The Sister City" by Brian Lumley, originally published in 1969.

== Plot summary ==
Professor Ewart Masters convalesces at the home of his nephew, after an automobile accident. There he discovers the existence of an ancient Cimmerian city beneath the Yorkshire moors. He proceeds to have dream adventures in the realms of the Great Old Ones.

== Reception ==
Gahan Wilson praised the novel as "by far the best thing [Lumley]'s done," with "a really dandy climax" and "a highly successful underground horrorland which is solid, consistent, and well designed."

== Sources ==
- Jaffery, Sheldon (1989). The Arkham House Companion. Mercer Island, WA: Starmont House, Inc. p. 107. ISBN 1-55742-005-X.
- Chalker, Jack L.; Owings, Mark (1998). The Science-Fantasy Publishers: A Bibliographic History, 1923-1998. Westminster, MD and Baltimore: Mirage Press, Ltd. p. 50.
- Joshi, S.T. (1999). Sixty Years of Arkham House: A History and Bibliography. Sauk City, WI: Arkham House. p. 131. ISBN 0-87054-176-5.
- Nielsen, Leon (2004). Arkham House Books: A Collector's Guide. Jefferson, NC and London: McFarland & Company, Inc. p. 118. ISBN 0-7864-1785-4.
