= Cthulhu 2000 =

1995 horror anthology

- Editor: Jim Turner
- Illustrator: Bob Eggleton
- Cover artist: Bob Eggleton
- Language: English
- Genre: Fantasy, horror
- Publisher: Arkham House
- Publication date: 1995
- Publication place: United States
- Media type: Print (hardback)
- Pages: xvi, 413
- ISBN: 0-87054-169-2

Cthulhu 2000: A Lovecraftian Anthology was edited by Jim Turner, first published by Arkham House in 1995 in an edition of 4,927 copies. As in his earlier collection, Turner criticizes the "latter-day Mythos pastiche" as simply "a banal modern horror story, preceded by the inevitable Necronomicon epigraph and indiscriminately interspersed with sesquipedalian deities, ichor-oozing tentacles, sundry eldritch abominations, and then the whole sorry mess rounded off with a cachinnating chorus of "Iä! Iä!"-chanting frogs." He declares that "the works collected in the present volume are not great Lovecraft stories; they rather are great stories in some way inspired by Lovecraft."

== Contents ==
The contents are:

- "Cthulhu 2000", by Jim Turner
- "The Barrens" by F. Paul Wilson
- "Pickman's Modem" by Lawrence Watt-Evans
- "Shaft Number 247" by Basil Copper
- "His Mouth Will Taste of Wormwood" by Poppy Z. Brite
- "The Adder" by Fred Chappell
- "Fat Face" by Michael Shea
- "The Big Fish" by Kim Newman
- "'I Had Vacantly Crumpled It Into My Pocket...But by God, Eliot, It Was a Photograph from Life!'" by Joanna Russ
- "H.P.L." by Gahan Wilson
- "The Unthinkable" by Bruce Sterling
- "Black Man with a Horn" by T. E. D. Klein
- "Love's Eldritch Ichor" by Esther M. Friesner
- "The Last Feast of Harlequin" by Thomas Ligotti
- "The Shadow on the Doorstep" by James P. Blaylock
- "Lord of the Land" by Gene Wolfe
- "The Faces at Pine Dunes" by Ramsey Campbell
- "On the Slab" by Harlan Ellison
- "24 Views of Mt. Fuji, by Hokusai" by Roger Zelazny

== Reception ==
Paul Pettengale for Interzone noted that it was "inspired by the works of H. P. Lovecraft [though sometimes only slightly]" and that "like all Arkham House books it's beautifully produced."

Gahan Wilson, one of the authors in the anthology, for Realms of Fantasy notes of the other stories that "There are a number of highly impressive star turns including those of F. Paul Wilson, Poppy Z. Brite, Ramsey Campbell, and Harlan Ellison which you may have come across if you're very well read, and there is T. E. D. Kline's absolutely brilliant 'Black Man With A Horn' which cannot be read enough."

Andy Robertson for Interzone notes that "Like every other work of 'Lovecraftian horror' that's been perpetrated since the word became an adjective, it is a disappointment. I don't think I am being too hard on it by saying this. Disappointment is an inextricable part of Lovecraftian pastiche and Lovecraftian imitation, and this book is less of a disappointment than most. I can unreservedly praise five or six stories here."

Stephen Mark Rainey for Deathrealm said that Cthulhu 2000 rates quite highly, and would be especially valuable to someone only moderately versed in the world of the Mythos. The best of the best in the 'modern' world of the Great Old Ones is to be found here, and the packaging is typical high-quality Arkham House, with a beautiful cover illo by Bob Eggleton."

Paul Pettengale reviewed Cthulhu 2000 again for Arcane magazine, rating it an 8 out of 10 overall and commented that "Cthulhu 2000 is a strong collection [and] it's a damn fine read."

The Year's Best Science Fiction: Thirteenth Annual Collection calls the book "a stylish and intelligent Lovecraftian anthology which, in addition to work by many of the writers you'd expect to find, also features work by writers who are usually not thought of as Lovecraftians, such as Roger Zelazny, Gene Wolfe, Lawrence Watt-Evans, Esther M. Friesner, Bruce Sterling, and Joanna Russ."

Publishers Weekly describes the anthology as "a swarm of fantasy tales inspired by the Providence recluse's hallucinatory work. Though many of the stories are reprints, the selections are solid examples of what Lovecraft termed 'the strange reality of the unreal.'"

Kirkus Reviews describes it as an "Anthology of reprints by 18 modern masters of the bizarre to honor horror mandarin Lovecraft's weird-aliens Cthulhu mythos, long mined by HPL followers for gold scatterings. Cosmic fantasist HPL regarded himself, as editor Turner tells us, as an 'indifferentist,' and any fellow human being as 'only another collection of molecules.' ... The Newman story alone is worth the price. The rest is just a seething mass of obscene gravy. Gobble it up."
