= Green Tea and Other Ghost Stories =

1945 collection of fantasy and horror short stories by J. Sheridan Le Fanu

- Dust-jacket illustration by Ronald Clyne for Green Tea and Other Ghost Stories
- Author: J. Sheridan Le Fanu
- Cover artist: Ronald Clyne
- Language: English
- Genre: Fantasy, horror
- Publisher: Arkham House
- Publication date: 1945
- Publication place: United States
- Media type: Print (hardback)
- Pages: x, 357

Green Tea and Other Ghost Stories is a collection of fantasy and horror short stories by Irish author J. Sheridan Le Fanu. It was released in 1945 and was the author's first book to be published in the United States. It was published by Arkham House in an edition of 2,026 copies. A much less extensive collection of Le Fanu stories was published under the same title by Dover Books in 1993.

== Contents ==
Green Tea and Other Ghost Stories contains the following tales:

1. "Foreword" by August Derleth
2. "Schalken, the Painter"
3. "Squire Toby's Will"
4. "Green Tea"
5. "Wicked Captain Walshawe, of Wauling"
6. "Carmilla"
7. "The Sexton's Adventure"
8. "Madame Crowl's Ghost"
9. "Sir Dominick's Bargain"
10. "The Vision of Tom Chuff"
11. "Ultor De Lacy"
12. "Dickon the Devil"
13. "The House in Aungier Street"
14. "Mr. Justice Harbottle"
15. "The Familiar"

== Reception ==
New York Times reviewer D. C. Russell wrote that although Le Fanu's storytelling skills were impressive, "the end of every story left me with a feeling of disappointment". Russell concluded that while Le Fanu "may write with the skill of an adult, the thought is without subtlety".

== Sources ==
- Jaffery, Sheldon (1989). The Arkham House Companion. Mercer Island, WA: Starmont House, Inc. p. 14. ISBN 1-55742-005-X.
- Chalker, Jack L.; Mark Owings (1998). The Science-Fantasy Publishers: A Bibliographic History, 1923-1998. Westminster, MD and Baltimore: Mirage Press, Ltd. p. 28.
- Joshi, S.T. (1999). Sixty Years of Arkham House: A History and Bibliography. Sauk City, WI: Arkham House. p. 32. ISBN 0-87054-176-5.
- Nielsen, Leon (2004). Arkham House Books: A Collector's Guide. Jefferson, NC and London: McFarland & Company, Inc. pp. 55–56. ISBN 0-7864-1785-4.
