= Someone in the Dark =

Short story collection by August Derleth

- Dust-jacket illustration by Frank Utpatel for Someone in the Dark
- Author: August Derleth
- Cover artist: Frank Utpatel
- Language: English
- Genre: Fantasy, horror
- Publisher: Arkham House
- Publication date: 1941
- Publication place: United States
- English publication date: none
- Media type: Print (hardback)
- Pages: 335

Someone in the Dark is a collection of fantasy and horror short stories by author August Derleth. It was released in 1941 and was the second book published by Arkham House. 1,115 copies were printed, priced at $2.00. In Thirty Years of Arkham House, Derleth implied that this title had sold out by the end of 1944.

However, more than twenty years later, in 1967, Derleth listed Someone in the Dark in an Arkham House bulletin with this announcement: "We have acquired a small stock of this title, Derleth's first collection of macabre tales, published in 1941. They will be sold at $5.00 the copy to patrons interested in acquiring the book..." Derleth was being disingenuous in suggesting these 'unearthed' copies were the 1941 edition. The additional 300 copies were printed in offset by Hunter Publishing Co. in Winston-Salem in 1965, the reprint probably authorized by Derleth himself. (In The Arkham House Companion, Sheldon Jaffery quotes a letter that seems to indicate this). The 1965 reprint are a quarter-inch higher than the originals, and are bound with headbands (not present in the 1941 first editions).

The 1965 edition is scarce. While it is not generally considered an official Arkham House publication, it is considered an essential acquisition for Arkham House completists.

A paperback reprint was issued by Jove Books in 1978.

== Contents ==
Someone in the Dark contains the following tales:

- "When the Night and House are still "
- "Glory Hand"
- "Compliments of Spectro"
- "A Gift for Uncle Herman"
- "McGovern's Obsession"
- "Three Gentlemen in Black"
- "Muggridge's Aunt"
- "Bramwell's Guardian"
- "Joliper's Gift"
- "Altimer's Amulet"
- "The Shuttered House"
- "The Sheraton Mirror"
- "The Wind from the River"
- "The Telephone in the Library"
- "The Panelled Room"
- "The Return of Hastur"
- "The Sandwin Compact"

== Reception ==
E. F. Bleiler noted that "the local, regionalistic American stories are best, while those in imitation of Lovecraft are weakest". New York Times reviewer Louise Maunsell Field gave the collection a relatively favorable review, saying that "The stories are for the most part well told, and lovers of tales of the occult will find the volume entertaining and congenial, although it has little of either sensitivity or beauty." Thrilling Wonder Stories commented that "Mr. Derleth writes quietly and with restraint, in beautifully measured sentences that stick to the essentials of the story he has to tell. His very restraint sometimes plays a trick on him -- and makes his writing appear at time to lack fire".

== Sources ==
- Jaffery, Sheldon (1989). The Arkham House Companion. Mercer Island, WA: Starmont House, Inc. pp. 2–4. ISBN 1-55742-005-X.
- Chalker, Jack L.; Mark Owings (1998). The Science-Fantasy Publishers: A Bibliographic History, 1923-1998. Westminster, MD and Baltimore: Mirage Press, Ltd. p. 26.
- Nielsen, Leon (2004). Arkham House Books: A Collector's Guide. Jefferson, NC and London: McFarland & Company, Inc. pp. 47–48. ISBN 0-7864-1785-4.
