= The Arkham Collector =

American fantasy, horror fiction and poetry magazine

Cover of Summer 1967 issue of The Arkham Collector

The Arkham Collector was an American fantasy, horror fiction and poetry magazine first published in Summer 1967. The magazine, edited by August Derleth, was the second of two magazines published by Arkham House, the other being the Arkham Sampler. Each issue of The Arkham Collector had an approximate print run of 2,500 copies. Its headquarters was in Sauk City, Wisconsin.

The Arkham Collector published news of upcoming Arkham House publications, items of associational interest, fiction and poetry. The magazine published work by H. P. Lovecraft, Clark Ashton Smith, Carl Jacobi, Joseph Payne Brennan, Brian Lumley, Gary Myers and others. Issue 10, Summer 1971, included the first published story by Alan Dean Foster. The magazine ran for ten issues and suspended publication following Derleth's death on July 4, 1971.

A hardbound volume in an edition of 676 copies (issued without dustjacket), collecting the entire run of ten issues, was published by Arkham House in 1971. See: The_Arkham_Collector:_Volume_I

== See also ==
- Science fiction magazine
- Fantasy fiction magazine
- Horror fiction magazine
