= Over the Edge (anthology) =

1964 anthology of horror stories edited by August Derleth

- Dust-jacket illustration by Frank Utpatel.
- Editor: August Derleth
- Cover artist: Frank Utpatel
- Language: English
- Genre: Fantasy, horror
- Publisher: Arkham House
- Publication date: 1964
- Publication place: United States
- Media type: Print (hardback)
- Pages: vi, 297

Over the Edge is an anthology of horror stories edited by American writer August Derleth. It was released in 1964 by Arkham House in an edition of 2,520 copies. The anthology was produced to mark the 25th anniversary of Arkham House. None of the stories had been previously published.

== Contents ==
Over the Edge contains the following tales:

- "Foreword", by August Derleth
- "The Crew of the Lancing", by William Hope Hodgson
- "The Last Meeting of Two Old Friends", by H. Russell Wakefield
- "The Shadow in the Attic", by H. P. Lovecraft and August Derleth
- "The Renegade", by John Metcalfe
- "Told in the Desert", by Clark Ashton Smith
- "When the Rains Came", by Frank Belknap Long
- "The Blue Flame of Vengeance", by Robert E. Howard & John Pocsik
- "Crabgrass", by Jesse Stuart
- "Kincaid's Car", by Carl Jacobi
- "The Patchwork Quilt", by August Derleth
- "The Black Gondolier", by Fritz Leiber
- "The Old Lady's Room", by J. Vernon Shea
- "The North Knoll", by Joseph Payne Brennan
- "The Huaco of Señor Perez", by Mary Elizabeth Counselman
- "Mr. Alucard", by David A. Johnstone
- "Casting the Stone", by John Pocsik
- "Aneanoshian", by Michael Bailey
- "The Stone on the Island", by J. Ramsey Campbell

== Sources ==
- Jaffery, Sheldon (1989). The Arkham House Companion. Mercer Island, WA: Starmont House, Inc. p. 73. ISBN 1-55742-005-X.
- Chalker, Jack L.; Mark Owings (1998). The Science-Fantasy Publishers: A Bibliographic History, 1923-1998. Westminster, MD and Baltimore: Mirage Press, Ltd. p. 41.
- Joshi, S.T. (1999). Sixty Years of Arkham House: A History and Bibliography. Sauk City, WI: Arkham House. p. 85. ISBN 0-87054-176-5.
- Nielsen, Leon (2004). Arkham House Books: A Collector's Guide. Jefferson, NC and London: McFarland & Company, Inc. p. 91. ISBN 0-7864-1785-4.
