= Kecksies and Other Twilight Tales =

1976 collection of stories by Marjorie Bowen

- Dust-jacket illustration by Stephen E. Fabian.
- Author: Marjorie Bowen
- Cover artist: Stephen E. Fabian
- Language: English
- Genre: Horror, Fantasy
- Publisher: Arkham House
- Publication date: 1976
- Publication place: United States
- Media type: Print (hardback)
- Pages: xiii, 207
- ISBN: 0-87054-077-7
- OCLC: 2794485
- Dewey Decimal: 823/.9/12
- LC Class: PZ3.B6746 Ke3 PR6003.O676

Kecksies and Other Twilight Tales is a collection of stories by British writer Marjorie Bowen. It was released in 1976 and was the author's first collection of stories published in the United States. It was published by Arkham House in an edition of 4,391 copies.

== Contents ==
Kecksies and Other Twilight Tales contains the following stories:

1. "Preface"
2. "The Hidden Ape"
3. "Kecksies"
4. "Raw Material"
5. "The Avenging of Ann Leete"
6. "The Crown Derby Plate"
7. "The Sign-Painter and the Crystal Fishes"
8. "Scoured Silk"
9. "The Breakdown"
10. "One Remained Behind"
11. "The House by the Poppy Field"
12. "Florence Flannery"
13. "Half-Past Two"

== Sources ==
- Jaffery, Sheldon (1989). The Arkham House Companion. Mercer Island, WA: Starmont House, Inc. p. 117. ISBN 1-55742-005-X.
- Chalker, Jack L.; Mark Owings (1998). The Science-Fantasy Publishers: A Bibliographic History, 1923-1998. Westminster, MD and Baltimore: Mirage Press, Ltd. p. 52.
- Joshi, S.T. (1999). Sixty Years of Arkham House: A History and Bibliography. Sauk City, WI: Arkham House. p. 141. ISBN 0-87054-176-5.
- Nielsen, Leon (2004). Arkham House Books: A Collector's Guide. Jefferson, NC and London: McFarland & Company, Inc. p. 123. ISBN 0-7864-1785-4.
