= Not Long for this World =

1948 collection of short stories by August Derleth

- Jacket illustration by Ronald Clyne.
- Author: August Derleth
- Cover artist: Ronald Clyne
- Language: English
- Genre: Fantasy, horror
- Publisher: Arkham House
- Publication date: 1948
- Publication place: United States
- Media type: Print (hardback)
- Pages: x, 221

Not Long for this World is a collection of fantasy and horror short stories by American writer August Derleth. It was released in 1948 and was the author's third collection published by Arkham House. It was released in an edition of 2,067 copies.

Most of the stories had originally appeared in the magazine Weird Tales.

== Contents ==
Not Long for this World contains the following tales:

- "Foreword"
- "The Shadow on the Sky"
- "Birkett's Twelfth Corpse"
- "The White Moth"
- "Nellie Foster"
- "Wild Grapes"
- "Feigman's Beard"
- "The Drifting Snow"
- "The Return of Sarah Purcell"
- "Logoda's Heads"
- "The Second Print"
- "Mrs. Elting Does Her Part"
- "A Little Knowledge"
- "Mrs. Bentley's Daughter"
- "Those Who Seek"
- "Mr. Berbeck Had a Dream"
- "The Tenant"
- "The Lilac Bush"
- "'Just a Song at Twilight'"
- "A Matter of Sight"
- "Prince Borgia's Mass"
- "A Dinner at Imola"
- "Lesandro's Familiar"
- "The Bridge of Sighs"
- "A Cloak from Messr. Lando"
- "He Shall Come"
- "Mrs. Lannisfree"
- "After You, Mr. Henderson"
- "Baynter's Imp"
- "The Lost Day"
- "A Collector of Stones"
- "The God-Box"
- "Saunder's Little Friend"

== Sources ==
- Jaffery, Sheldon (1989). The Arkham House Companion. Mercer Island, WA: Starmont House, Inc. pp. 34=35. ISBN 1-55742-005-X.
- Chalker, Jack L.; Mark Owings (1998). The Science-Fantasy Publishers: A Bibliographic History, 1923-1998. Westminster, MD and Baltimore: Mirage Press, Ltd. p. 32.
- Joshi, S.T. (1999). Sixty Years of Arkham House: A History and Bibliography. Sauk City, WI: Arkham House. p. 50. ISBN 0-87054-176-5.
- Nielsen, Leon (2004). Arkham House Books: A Collector's Guide. Jefferson, NC and London: McFarland & Company, Inc. p. 69. ISBN 0-7864-1785-4.
