= Sixty Years of Arkham House =

Book by S. T. Joshi

- Dust-jacket design by Allen Koszowski for Sixty Years of Arkham House
- Author: S.T. Joshi
- Illustrator: Allen Koszowski
- Cover artist: Allen Koszowski
- Language: English
- Subject: Bibliography
- Publisher: Arkham House
- Publication date: 1999
- Publication place: United States
- Media type: Print (Hardback)
- Pages: viii, 281 pp
- ISBN: 0-87054-176-5
- OCLC: 42680266
- Dewey Decimal: 070.5/09755/76 21
- LC Class: Z473.A68 S59 1999

Sixty Years of Arkham House is a bibliography of books published from 1939 to 1999 under the imprints of Arkham House, Mycroft & Moran and Stanton & Lee. It was released in 1999 by Arkham House in an edition of approximately 3,500 copies. The book updates Thirty Years of Arkham House, 1939-1969: A History and Bibliography adding extensive biographical and bibliographical notes.

It won the Locus Award for Best Non-fiction in 2000.
