= The Breath of Suspension =

1994 collection of science fiction stories by Alexander Jablokov

- Dust-jacket illustration by Jeffrey K. Potter.
- Author: Alexander Jablokov
- Illustrator: Jeffrey K. Potter
- Cover artist: Jeffrey K. Potter
- Language: English
- Genre: Science fiction
- Publisher: Arkham House
- Publication date: 1994
- Publication place: United States
- Media type: Print (hardback)
- Pages: viii, 318
- ISBN: 0-87054-167-6
- OCLC: 29183659
- Dewey Decimal: 813/.54 20
- LC Class: PS3560.A116 B74 1994

The Breath of Suspension is a collection of science fiction stories by American writer Alexander Jablokov. It was released in 1994. It was the author's first book published by Arkham House. It was published in an edition of 3,496 copies. The stories originally appeared in Isaac Asimov's Science Fiction Magazine.

== Contents ==
- "The Breath of Suspension"
- "Living Will"
- "Many Mansions"
- "The Death Artist"
- "At the Cross-Time Jaunters' Ball"
- "Above Ancient Seas"
- "Deathbinder"
- "The Ring of Memory"
- "Beneath the Shadow of Her Smile"
- "A Deeper Sea"

== Sources ==
- Chalker, Jack L.; Mark Owings (1998). The Science-Fantasy Publishers: A Bibliographic History, 1923-1998. Westminster, MD and Baltimore: Mirage Press, Ltd. p. 59.
- Joshi, S.T. (1999). Sixty Years of Arkham House: A History and Bibliography. Sauk City, WI: Arkham House. pp. 165–166. ISBN 0-87054-176-5.
- Nielsen, Leon (2004). Arkham House Books: A Collector's Guide. Jefferson, NC and London: McFarland & Company, Inc. p. 139. ISBN 0-7864-1785-4.
