= Harrigan's File =

1975 collection of stories by August Derleth

- Dust-jacket illustration by Frank Utpatel for Harrigan's File
- Author: August Derleth
- Cover artist: Frank Utpatel
- Language: English
- Genre: Science fiction, horror, fantasy
- Publisher: Arkham House
- Publication date: 1975
- Publication place: United States
- Media type: Print (hardback)
- Pages: 256
- ISBN: 0-87054-070-X
- OCLC: 1583839
- Dewey Decimal: 813/.0876
- LC Class: PZ3.D445 Har PS3507.E69

Harrigan's File is a collection of stories by American writer August Derleth. It was released in 1975 by Arkham House in an edition of 4,102 copies. The book collects all of Derleth's science fiction. The stories are about newspaper reporter Tex Harrigan.

== Contents ==
Harrigan's File contains the following tales:

- "McIlvaine's Star"
- "A Corner for Lucia"
- "Invaders from the Microcosm"
- "Mary VII"
- "The Other Side of the Wall"
- "An Eye for History"
- "The Maugham Obsession"
- "A Traveler in Time"
- "The Detective and the Senator"
- "Protoplasma"
- "The Mechanical House"
- "By Rocket to the Moon"
- "The Man Who Rode the Saucer"
- "Ferguson's Capsules"
- "The Penfield Misadventure"
- "The Remarkable Dingdong"
- "The Martian Artifact"

== Sources ==
- Jaffery, Sheldon (1989). The Arkham House Companion. Mercer Island, WA: Starmont House, Inc. pp. 113–114. ISBN 1-55742-005-X.
- Chalker, Jack L.; Mark Owings (1998). The Science-Fantasy Publishers: A Bibliographic History, 1923-1998. Westminster, MD and Baltimore: Mirage Press, Ltd. p. 51.
- Joshi, S.T. (1999). Sixty Years of Arkham House: A History and Bibliography. Sauk City, WI: Arkham House. p. 137. ISBN 0-87054-176-5.
- Nielsen, Leon (2004). Arkham House Books: A Collector's Guide. Jefferson, NC and London: McFarland & Company, Inc. p. 121. ISBN 0-7864-1785-4.
