= David Kesterton =

Canadian novelist

- Born: 1948 (age 77–78); Regina, Saskatchewan
- Occupation: novelist
- Writing career
- Genre: fantasy

David Kesterton (born 1948) is a Canadian novelist. His first book, The Darkling was published in 1982 by Arkham House. A corrected, authorized edition was published in 2011 by Necrominster Press.
