= Golden Gryphon Press =

Defunct American small press

- Founded: 1996
- Founder: Jim Turner
- Country of origin: United States
- Headquarters location: Urbana, Illinois
- Publication types: Books
- Fiction genres: science fiction, fantasy, dark fantasy and cross-genre

Golden Gryphon Press was an independent publishing company, specializing in science fiction, fantasy, dark fantasy and cross-genre novels. It was founded in 1996 by Jim Turner, former editor at Arkham House, until his death in 1999. It was then operated by his brother Gary, editor Marty Halpern, and Gary's wife, Geri, until the company's closure in 2017.

The company has published work by Robert Reed, Michael Bishop, Andy Duncan, Geoffrey A. Landis, Paul Di Filippo, James Patrick Kelly, Lucius Shepard, Charles Stross, Gregory Frost, Nancy Kress, George Alec Effinger, Warren Rochelle, Jeffrey Ford and Howard Waldrop.
