= Flowers from the Moon and Other Lunacies =

Collection of short stories by Robert Bloch

- Dust-jacket illustration by Tony Patrick for Flowers from the Moon and Other Lunacies
- Author: Robert Bloch
- Cover artist: Tony Patrick, design by Martin Hertzel
- Language: English
- Genre: Horror, Fantasy
- Publisher: Arkham House
- Publication date: 1998
- Publication place: United States
- Media type: Print (hardback)
- Pages: xii, 296
- ISBN: 0-87054-172-2
- OCLC: 38258215
- Dewey Decimal: 813/.54 21
- LC Class: PS3503.L718 F58 1998

Flowers from the Moon and Other Lunacies is a collection of horror and fantasy stories by American writer Robert Bloch. It was released in 1998 and was the author's third book published by Arkham House. It was published in an edition of 2,565 copies. The stories, selected by Robert M. Price, originally appeared in the magazines Weird Tales, Strange Stories, and Rogue. The collection includes some Cthulhu Mythos stories.

== Contents ==
Flowers from the Moon and Other Lunacies contains the following tales:

1. "Introduction", by Robert M. Price
2. "The Druidic Doom"
3. "Fangs of Vengeance"
4. "Death is An Elephant"
5. "A Question of Identity"
6. "Death Has Five Guesses"
7. "The Bottomless Pool"
8. "The Dark Isle"
9. "Flowers From the Moon"
10. "He Waits Beneath the Sea"
11. "Power of Druid"
12. "Be Yourself"
13. "A Sorcerer Runs for Sheriff"
14. "Black Bargain"
15. "A Bottle of Gin"
16. "Wine of Sabbat"
17. "Soul Proprietor"
18. "Satan’s Phonograph"
19. "The Man Who Told The Truth"
20. "The Night They Crashed the Party"
21. "Philtre Tip"

== Sources ==
- Chalker, Jack L.; Mark Owings (1998). The Science-Fantasy Publishers: A Bibliographic History, 1923-1998. Westminster, MD and Baltimore: Mirage Press, Ltd. pp. 60–61.
- Joshi, S.T. (1999). Sixty Years of Arkham House: A History and Bibliography. Sauk City, WI: Arkham House. pp. 170–171. ISBN 0-87054-176-5.
- Nielsen, Leon (2004). Arkham House Books: A Collector's Guide. Jefferson, NC and London: McFarland & Company, Inc. p. 141. ISBN 0-7864-1785-4.
