= The Dunwich Horror and Others =

Short story collection by Howard Phillips Lovecraft

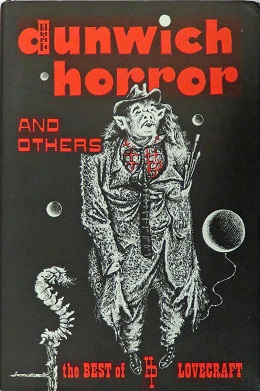
- Dust-jacket illustration by Lee Brown Coye for The Dunwich Horror and Others
- Author: H. P. Lovecraft
- Cover artist: Lee Brown Coye
- Language: English
- Genre: Fantasy, horror, science fiction
- Publisher: Arkham House
- Publication date: 1963
- Publication place: United States
- Media type: Print (hardback)
- Pages: xx, 431 pp
- ISBN: 0-87054-037-8 (revised edition)

The Dunwich Horror and Others is a collection of fantasy, horror and science fiction short stories by American author H. P. Lovecraft. It was originally published in 1963 by Arkham House in an edition of 3,133 copies.

The true first edition is not bound with head- and tailbands, and the true first-state dustjacket carries a price of $5.00 (not $6.50 as on later printings). (Reportedly some copies lack head and tailbands, indicating the true first edition, but bear the $6.50 price on the dustjacket, suggesting that the publisher ran out of first-edition dustjackets before they ran out of first-edition books, so they raised the price to $6.50, sold the remaining first-edition volumes in second-state jackets, and then started reprinting the book).

The collection was revised in 1985 by S.T. Joshi, replacing the introduction by August Derleth for one by Joshi ("A Note on the Texts") and another by Robert Bloch ("Heritage of Horror"). This edition, designated a "corrected sixth printing", was published in an edition of 4,124 copies. Bloch's Introduction was reprinted here from its first appearance in The Best of H. P. Lovecraft: Bloodcurdling Tales of Horror and the Macabre.

== Contents ==
The Dunwich Horror and Others contains the following tales:

1. H. P. Lovecraft and His Work by August Derleth
2. In the Vault
3. Pickman's Model
4. The Rats in the Walls
5. The Outsider
6. The Colour out of Space
7. The Music of Erich Zann
8. The Haunter of the Dark
9. The Picture in the House
10. The Call of Cthulhu
11. The Dunwich Horror
12. Cool Air
13. The Whisperer in Darkness
14. The Terrible Old Man
15. The Thing on the Doorstep
16. The Shadow Over Innsmouth
17. The Shadow Out of Time

== Reprints ==
- 2nd printing, 1966 - 2,090 copies.
- 3rd printing, 1970 - 4,050 copies.
- 4th printing, 1974 - 4,978 copies.
- 5th printing, 1981 - 3,084 copies.
- corrected 6th printing, 1985 - 4,124 copies.
- corrected 7th printing, 1985 - 3,675 copies.
- corrected 8th printing, 1988 - 4,783 copies.
- corrected 9th printing, 1992 - 4,973 copies.
- corrected 10th printing, 1997 - 2,945 copies.
- corrected 11th printing, 2000 - 2,500 copies.
