= Selected Letters of Clark Ashton Smith =

- Dust-jacket for Selected Letters of Clark Ashton Smith
- Author: Clark Ashton Smith
- Cover artist: JenGraph and Jennifer Niles
- Language: English
- Subject: letters
- Publisher: Arkham House
- Publication date: 2003
- Publication place: United States
- Media type: Print (Hardback)
- Pages: xxvii, 417
- ISBN: 0-87054-182-X
- OCLC: 54406139
- Dewey Decimal: 813/.52 B 22
- LC Class: PS3537.M335 Z48 2003

Selected Letters of Clark Ashton Smith is a book of letters by American writer Clark Ashton Smith. It was released in 2003 by Arkham House in an edition of approximately 3,000 copies. The collection was edited by David E. Schultz and Scott Conners.

== Contents ==
Selected Letters of Clark Ashton Smith includes letters to:

- George Sterling
- Frank Belknap Long
- Donald Wandrei
- H. P. Lovecraft
- August Derleth
- R. H. Barlow
- L. Sprague de Camp
