= The House of the Worm =

1975 collection of stories by Gary Myers

- Dust-jacket illustration by Allan Servoss for The House of the Worm
- Author: Gary Myers
- Illustrator: Allan Servoss
- Cover artist: Allan Servoss
- Language: English
- Genre: Horror, Fantasy
- Publisher: Arkham House
- Publication date: 1975
- Publication place: United States
- Media type: Print (hardback)
- Pages: ix, 77
- ISBN: 0-87054-071-8
- OCLC: 1582475
- Dewey Decimal: 813/.5/4
- LC Class: PZ4.M99724 Ho PS3563.Y37

The House of the Worm is a collection of stories by American writer Gary Myers. It was published in 1975 by Arkham House in an edition of 4,144 copies and was the author's first book. The collection is written in a style that closely mimics the works of H. P. Lovecraft and Lord Dunsany, serving as an effective expansion of Lovecraft's Dream Cycle.

Though presented by the publisher as a novel of the Cthulhu Mythos, the book is, in fact, a collection of loosely connected stories.

The first story, "The House of the Worm," was included (as "The Feast in the House of the Worm") in Lin Carter's anthology New Worlds for Old (1971), part of the Ballantine Adult Fantasy series. All ten stories from the collection were later included in Myers's 2013 collection, The Country of the Worm.

== Contents ==
- "Introduction"
- I "The House of the Worm"
- II "Yohk the Necromancer"
- III "Xiurhn"
- IV "Passing of a Dreamer"
- V "The Return of Zhosph"
- VI "The Three Enchantments"
- VII "Hazuth-Kleg"
- VIII "The Loot of Golthoth"
- IX "The Four Sealed Jars"
- X "The Maker of Gods"
