= The Arkham Collector: Volume I =

- Author: edited by August Derleth
- Language: English
- Subject: magazine
- Publisher: Arkham House
- Publication date: 1971
- Publication place: United States
- Media type: Print (Hardback)
- Pages: 348 pp

The Arkham Collector: Volume I is a collection of the entire run of the magazine The Arkham Collector from 1967 to 1971. It was released in 1971 by Arkham House in an edition of 676 copies and was not jacketed. The printrun was determined by the number of separate issues with the fewest copies remaining unsold.

In addition to reprinting the entire contents of the separate issues, this compilation provides an Index to all poetry, essays, and stories that appeared in the magazine, and to 'necrologies' (obituaries of various Arkham House authors).

Sheldon Jaffery records two binding states for this volume: "more commonly, a highly reflective black cloth, gold-stamped on the backstrip, measuring 12.5cm from hinge to foreedge; less common is a variant binding of dull (relatively non-reflective) black cloth measuring about 12cm from hinge to foreedge."
