= Gary Myers (writer) =

American writer of fantasy and horror (born 1952)

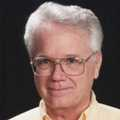
- Born: Gary Clayton Myers; August 15, 1952 (age 74); Lynwood, California, U.S.
- Occupations: Short-story writer; novelist; illustrator
- Spouse: Jennifer McIlwee Myers
- Writing career
- Genres: Fantasy, horror

Gary Clayton Myers (born August 15, 1952) is an American writer of fantasy and horror. He is a resident of Fullerton, California.

Myers's first story, "The House of the Worm," appeared in a 1970 issue of The Arkham Collector, edited by H. P. Lovecraft’s friend and publisher August Derleth, when Myers was 17. Two further stories appeared in the same magazine.

Later in the '70s, Myers's work appeared in a series of anthologies edited by Lin Carter. These included one volume of the Ballantine Adult Fantasy Series and two volumes of The Year's Best Fantasy Stories.

In the ’80s and ’90s, Myers’ work appeared mainly in little magazines like Crypt of Cthulhu, and in a number of Lovecraft-themed anthologies, usually edited by Robert M. Price.

Myers's first book, The House of the Worm, was a collection of Cthulhu Mythos stories in the fantasy manner of Lovecraft and Lord Dunsany; it was published by Arkham House in 1975 with illustrations by Allan Servoss. It is now out of print.

His second book, Dark Wisdom: New Tales of the Old Ones, was a collection of Cthulhu Mythos stories in a more contemporary horror mode; it was published by Mythos Books in 2007 with illustrations by the author. It was reprinted as Dark Wisdom: Tales of the Old Ones, without the illustrations, through CreateSpace in 2013

His third book, The Country of the Worm: Excursions Beyond the Wall of Sleep, was an expansion of his first, adding thirteen stories to the original ten of The House of the Worm; it was self-published through CreateSpace in 2013. Myers continued to expand this collection for several years after the first edition. In the second edition, published in 2022, the story count stands at thirty.

His fourth book, Gray Magic: An Episode of Eibon, was his first and only novel, a fantasy adventure of Eibon of Mhu Thulan, a character and milieu invented by Clark Ashton Smith; it was self-published through CreateSpace in 2013.

His fifth book, Lovecraft's Syndrome: An Asperger's Appraisal of the Writer's Life, co-authored with Jennifer McIlwee Myers, was his first non-fiction work; it was self-published through CreateSpace in 2015.

His sixth book, Myers's Folly: Afterwords for Forbidden Books, was his second non-fiction work, a commentary on Myers's own fiction-writing career; it was self-published through Kindle Direct Publishing in 2023.

His seventh book, The Last Offering: A Horror Play, was his first and only play, a late return to the fantasy manner of Lovecraft and Dunsany; it was self-published through Kindle Direct Publishing in 2024.

Myers is the illustrator for most of his books. He contributed ten black-and-white interior illustrations to the Mythos Books edition of Dark Wisdom. He also contributed cover illustrations to his self-published editions of The Country of the Worm, Dark Wisdom, Gray Magic, Lovecraft's Syndrome, Myers's Folly and The Last Offering.
