= The Darkling =

1982 novel by David Kesterton

- Dust-jacket illustration by Raymond Bayless for The Darkling
- Author: David Kesterton
- Illustrator: frontispiece map by Jason Van Hollander
- Cover artist: Raymond Bayless
- Language: English
- Genre: Fantasy
- Publisher: Arkham House
- Publication date: 1982
- Publication place: United States
- Media type: Print (hardback)
- Pages: 259 pp
- ISBN: 0-87054-090-4
- OCLC: 8346420
- Dewey Decimal: 813/.54 19
- LC Class: PR9199.3.K428 D3 1982

The Darkling is a fantasy novel by author David Kesterton. It was published by Arkham House in 1982 in an edition of 3,126 copies. It was the author's first book.

The author complained of editorial interference with his prose which led to poor reviews, and with the aid of Anne McCaffrey and the Science Fiction Writers of America had Arkham House lawyers relinquish rights to the author. Arkham House retained the right to sell out the remaining copies of their edition.

In 2011, the author finally published a limited edition (105 copies) under the imprint of Necrominster Press which restored his preferred prose and added six illustrations to his 'corrected, authorized first edition'. . This Necrominster Press edition is an associational oddity for Arkham House collectors.

== Plot summary ==
Set in the distant future, a young tribesman, Maradek searches for his father, Afurad. In the course of this search, he helps to foil the forces that threaten the world's destruction.

== Reviews ==
- Sorcerer's Apprentice #16
