= The Face in the Mirror =

- Dust-jacket by Gary Gore for The Face in the Mirror
- Author: Denys Val Baker
- Cover artist: Gary Gore
- Language: English
- Genre: Fantasy, horror
- Publisher: Arkham House
- Publication date: 1971
- Publication place: United States
- Media type: Print (hardback)
- Pages: 113 pp

The Face in the Mirror is a collection of stories by author Denys Val Baker. It was released in 1971 and was the author's first American collection of stories. It was published by Arkham House in an edition of 2,045 copies.

== Contents ==
The Face in the Mirror contains the following tales:

1. "The Face in the Mirror"
2. "The Inheritance"
3. "The Anniversary"
4. "Voice From the Past"
5. "Passenger to Liverpool"
6. "The Trees"
7. "A Woman of Talent"
8. "The Cruise of the Morwenna"
9. "A Tall Tale"
10. "The Old Man of the Towans"
11. "The Tune"
12. "The Last Laugh"
