= Some Notes on H. P. Lovecraft =

- Cover design by Gary Gore for Some Notes on H. P. Lovecraft
- Author: August Derleth
- Cover artist: Gary Gore
- Language: English
- Genre: Biography
- Publisher: Arkham House
- Publication date: 1959
- Publication place: United States
- Media type: Print (Paperback)
- Pages: 42 pp

Some Notes on H. P. Lovecraft is a collection of biographical notes about H. P. Lovecraft by writer August Derleth. It was released in 1959 by Arkham House in an edition of 1,044 copies.

== Contents ==
1. "The Myths"
2. "The Unfinished Manuscripts"
3. "The Writing Habits"
4. "The Barlow Journal"
5. "H. P. Lovecraft: Four Letters"

== Reprints ==
- Folcroft, PA: Folcroft Press, 1971.[hardcover, library binding]
- Norwood, PA: Norwood Editions, 1976.[hardcover, library binding]
- Philadelphia: R. West, 1977.
- Darby, PA: Arden Library, 1980.
- West Warwick, RI: Necronomicon Press, 1982.
