= 100 Books by August Derleth =

1962 bibliography by August Derleth

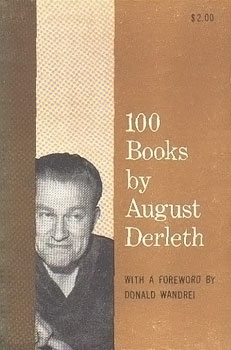
- Cover of 100 Books by August Derleth designed by Gary Gore
- Author: August Derleth
- Cover artist: Gary Gore
- Language: English
- Genre: Bibliography
- Publisher: Arkham House
- Publication date: 1962
- Publication place: United States
- Media type: Print (Paperback)
- Pages: 121 pp

100 Books by August Derleth is a bibliography of books by American author August Derleth. It was released in 1962 by Arkham House in an edition of 1,225 copies. Approximately 200 copies of the edition were bound in pictorial boards for libraries (the edition in boards was issued without dustwrapper). The foreword is by Donald Wandrei.

The book includes two plates, one a frontispiece of Derleth in his office, the other of Derleth with his children, Walden William and April Rose. There is also an illustration reproducing a mock certificate awarding Derleth the degree of "Doctor of Philosophy in Mythos" to Derleth, from Miskatonic University.

== Contents ==
- "Foreword" by Donald Wandrei
- Biographical
- Bibliographical
- A Checklist of Published Books
- Awaiting Publication
- Work in Progress
- Summary
- Recordings
- Compilations
- Anthologies / Textbooks
- Publications
- Films
- Lectures
- Appraisals
- From the Reviews
- Self-Appraisal

== Reprints ==
- Verona, WI: E.V.A., 1974.
