= And Afterward, the Dark =

- Dust-jacket illustration by Stephen E. Fabian for And Afterward, the Dark
- Author: Basil Copper
- Cover artist: Stephen E. Fabian
- Language: English
- Genre: Fantasy, Horror short stories
- Publisher: Arkham House
- Publication date: 1977
- Publication place: United States
- Media type: Print (hardback)
- Pages: xii, 222 pp
- ISBN: 0-87054-079-3
- OCLC: 3624670
- Dewey Decimal: 823/.9/14
- LC Class: PZ4.C7857 An 1977 PR6053.O658

And Afterward, the Dark is a collection of stories by author Basil Copper. It was released in 1977 and was the author's second collection of stories published by Arkham House. It was published in an edition of 4,259 copies. One of the stories, "Camera Obscura", was produced in 1973 for the television series Night Gallery.

== Contents ==
And Afterward, the Dark contains the following stories:

1. "Introduction", by Edward Wagenknecht
2. "The Spider"
3. "The Cave"
4. "Dust to Dust"
5. "Camera Obscura"
6. "The Janissaries of Emilion"
7. "Archives of the Dead"
8. "The Flabby Men"
