= New Horizons (book) =

- Dust-jacket illustration by Stephen E. Fabian for New Horizons
- Editor: August Derleth
- Cover artist: Stephen E. Fabian
- Language: English
- Genre: Science fiction short stories
- Publisher: Arkham House
- Publication date: 1998 (1999)
- Publication place: United States
- Media type: Print (hardback)
- Pages: xv, 299
- ISBN: 0-87054-174-9
- OCLC: 40230833
- Dewey Decimal: 813/.0876208 21
- LC Class: PS648.S3 N427 1998

New Horizons is an anthology of science fiction stories edited by American writer August Derleth. It was released posthumously by the specialty house publisher Arkham House in a hardcover edition of 2,917 copies. While the title page gives the date of publication as 1998, the book was not actually printed and released until 1999. The book is an anthology that Derleth had planned in the early 1960s, but never published.

== Contents ==
New Horizons contains the following stories:

- "Introduction", by Joseph Wrzos
- Part I: Time Travel Before Tachyons
  - "The Runaway Skyscraper", by Murray Leinster
  - "A Dream of Armageddon", by H.G. Wells
  - "Willie", by Frank Belknap Long
  - "The Pureblind Prophet", by David H. Keller and Paul Spencer
- Part II: Technological Triumphs: The Light Side
  - "The Feline Light and Power Company", by Jacque Morgan
  - "Solander's Radio Tomb", by Ellis Parker Butler
  - "The Perambulating Home", by Henry Hugh Simmons
- Part III: Global Catastrophe: Atlantean
  - "Countries in the Sea", by August Derleth and Mark Schorer
- Part IV: Amazing Discoveries: The Flip Side
  - "The Ultra-Elixir of Youth", by A. Hyatt Verrill
  - "The Book of Worlds", by Miles J. Breuer
  - "The Truth About the Psycho-tector", by Stanton A. Coblentz
- Part V: Menace from Above: Local, Interstellar
  - "Raiders of the Universes", by Donald Wandrei
  - "The Planet Entity", by E.M. Johnston and Clark Ashton Smith
- Appendix: August Derleth's Science Fiction Anthologies

== Sources ==
- Chalker, Jack L.; Mark Owings (1999). The Science-Fantasy Publishers: A Bibliographic History, 1923-1998, Supplement 7. Westminster, MD and Baltimore: Mirage Press, Ltd. p. 4.
- Joshi, S.T. (1999). Sixty Years of Arkham House: A History and Bibliography. Sauk City, WI: Arkham House. p. 173. ISBN 0-87054-176-5.
- Nielsen, Leon (2004). Arkham House Books: A Collector's Guide. Jefferson, NC and London: McFarland & Company, Inc. pp. 143–144. ISBN 0-7864-1785-4.
