= Arkham House =

American publishing house specializing in weird fiction

- Founded: 1939; 87 years ago
- Founder: August Derleth; Donald Wandrei
- Headquarters location: Sauk City, Wisconsin
- Publication types: Books
- Fiction genres: weird fiction
- Official website: http://www.arkhamhousepublisher.com/

Arkham House was an American publishing house specializing in weird fiction. It was founded in Sauk City, Wisconsin, in 1939 by August Derleth and Donald Wandrei to publish hardcover collections of H. P. Lovecraft's best works, which had previously been published only in pulp magazines. The company's name is derived from Lovecraft's fictional New England city, Arkham, Massachusetts. Arkham House editions are noted for the quality of their printing and binding. The printer's mark for Arkham House was designed by Frank Utpatel.

== Founding ==
In late 1937, after Lovecraft's death, Derleth and Wandrei sought to produce a collection of their friend's best weird fiction from the pulp magazines into a memorial volume. After several failed attempts to interest major publishers in the omnibus volume, the two men realized no publisher would be willing to take a chance with the collection. Derleth and Wandrei then decided to form their own company, Arkham House with the express purpose of publishing all of Lovecraft's writings in hardcover. The omnibus volume was scheduled as the first offering from Arkham House and priced at $5.00, although advance orders were accepted at $3.50. Even at that bargain price, only 150 advance orders were received for The Outsider and Others before its release in 1939.

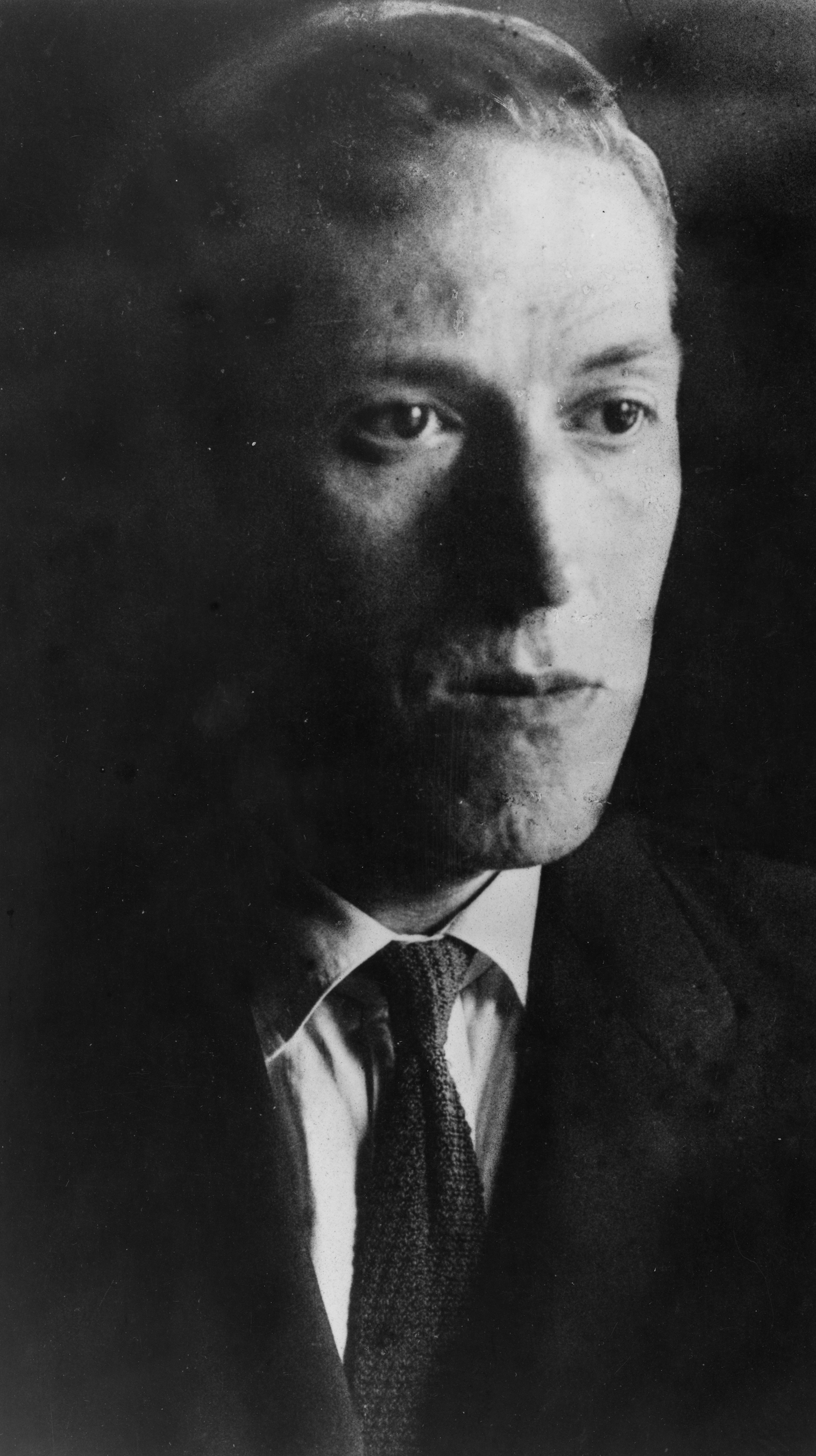
Arkham House was founded to publish the works of H. P. Lovecraft.

The Outsider was printed by the George Banta Co. of Wisconsin in an edition of 1,268 copies. The book was over 550 pages long with small print and featured a dustjacket by fantasy artist Virgil Finlay. The omnibus sold slowly but steadily. Derleth was a successful writer and had a good deal of revenue coming in from his writing work, which allowed him to subsidize Arkham House's operations without it needing to realize a quick profit.

A second Lovecraft omnibus, Beyond the Wall of Sleep, appeared in 1943 as sales on all Arkham House books continued to advance. By 1944, Arkham House was established as a successful small press, with four titles appearing (collections of works by Donald Wandrei, Henry S. Whitehead, Clark Ashton Smith, and a final Lovecraft omnibus). In 1945, Arkham House widened its range by publishing two novels, neither of which had seen print in any form before. These were Witch House by Evangeline Walton and The Lurker at the Threshold by August Derleth (based on an outline by H. P. Lovecraft). Derleth also widened Arkham's range by publishing collections of stories by well-known fantasy authors, the first being Green Tea and Other Ghost Stories by the Irish author J. Sheridan Le Fanu. Collections by Englishmen A.E. Coppard, H. Russell Wakefield, William Hope Hodgson and Algernon Blackwood followed in 1947. Also in 1947 were books by three American writers, including the science fiction novel Slan by A.E. Van Vogt. Derleth must have felt he was in the wrong field as Slan, with a print run of over 4,000 copies proved to be the fastest and best selling Arkham House of the 1940s.

Arkham House published many books in the fantasy and horror field including a small but steady number throughout the 1950s. Robert Weinberg has written that: "However, intense competition from the SF (science fiction) small presses as well as slow sales of certain titles put August Derleth in a precarious bind. Only a generous loan from Dr David H. Keller prevented Arkham from going bankrupt during a period of cash flow problems in 1948. Keller visited Derleth's home, "The Place of Hawks" in the company of Sam Moskowitz, the object of the visit being Derleth agreeing to publish a Keller book under the Arkham House imprint, Keller to advance Derleth a loan against the cost of the book. Derleth revealed to Keller and Moskowitz that he owed his printer $2500 and had exhausted every possible source of help. Upon Keller's return to his home in Stroudsburg, Pennsylvania, he wrote a check for the needed sum and sent it to Derleth as a loan at 35% interest on Derleth's personal note. Reporting the transaction in Thirty Years of Arkham House, Derleth adds: "I had not asked for it; he had offered it with the comment, 'I pride myself on my judgment of character.' No greater compliment could have been paid me or Arkham House.'"

In the late 1960s, Arkham House seemed again on the verge of going bankrupt, but suddenly found a whole new market for its books when the surge in interest in Robert E. Howard (capitalized upon by Donald M. Grant) coincided with a surge in interest in the work of H. P. Lovecraft. All of Lovecraft's works were reprinted in three newly edited omnibus volumes, which were kept continually in print.

In addition to volumes of H. P. Lovecraft's fiction, Arkham House began to publish a five volume edition of Lovecraft's Selected Letters which had been planned from the very start of the company, and which gives an overview of Lovecraft's correspondence to peers, friends and family. Among his correspondents were Arkham House founders, Derleth and Wandrei. (Arkham House's volumes of Lovecraft's letters are highly abridged; unabridged volumes of Lovecraft's letters to individual correspondents have been issued progressively by Hippocampus Press). After a long slow period, Arkham House entered the 1970s with ambitious publishing plans.

Arkham House also published fiction by many of Lovecraft's contemporaries, including Ray Bradbury, Robert E. Howard, Frank Belknap Long, Clark Ashton Smith, Robert Bloch, and Derleth himself; classic genre fiction by authors such as William Hope Hodgson (under the prompting of Herman Charles Koenig), Algernon Blackwood, H. Russell Wakefield, Seabury Quinn, and Sheridan Le Fanu; and later writers in the Lovecraft school, such as Ramsey Campbell and Brian Lumley to whom Derleth gave their earliest publication in hardcover.

Despite the wealth of talented writers who appeared under the Arkham House imprint, it was not a financial success. Derleth wrote in 1970, "[T]he fact is that in no single year since its founding have the earnings of Arkham House met the expenses, so that it has been necessary for my personal earnings to shore up Arkham House finances." Robert Weinberg has stated "Arkham House's greatest flop was Witch House, an excellent novel that took nearly two decades to go out of print."

The last Arkham House book personally supervised by Derleth was the fantasy poetry collection Songs and Sonnets Atlantean by Donald Sidney-Fryer. After Derleth's death in 1971 Donald Wandrei briefly acted as editorial director but declined to resume his interest in the firm permanently.

Prior to the 1980s Arkham House did not reprint its books (with some exceptions such as Someone in the Dark and Night's Yawning Peal: A Ghostly Company and four of the core Lovecraft collections issued in the 1960s—Dagon and Other Macabre Tales, At the Mountains of Madness and Other Novels, The Horror in the Museum and Other Revisions and The Dunwich Horror and Others). Rights were occasionally sold during the 1960s and 1970s to other publishers who issued paperback editions of Arkham House titles. However, this changed in the 1980s. There are now multiple printings and/or alternate editions of over 20 individual Arkham House titles.

== Operation ==
August Derleth's children April (Rose) and Walden (Wally) Derleth co-owned the publisher, April running the business while Wally had no direct involvement in its day-to-day operations. April earned a Bachelor of Arts degree in English from the University of Wisconsin-Madison in 1977. She became majority stockholder, President, and CEO of Arkham House in 1994, in which capacity she remained until her death in March, 2011.

Wandrei was succeeded as editorial director by James Turner. Throughout the 1970s and 1980s, Turner expanded the company's range of authors to include such prominent science fiction and fantasy writers as Michael Bishop, Lucius Shepard, Bruce Sterling, James Tiptree, Jr., Michael Shea and J. G. Ballard, often publishing hardcover collections of shorter works. Turner's acquisitions took the publisher away from its roots in weird and horror fiction, and he was eventually dismissed by April Derleth in 1997. He went on to found Golden Gryphon Press.

In 1997 Peter Ruber was appointed as her consulting editor and successor to James Turner. April became president of Arkham House in 2002. She made the house's mission a return to classic weird fiction, which Ruber sought to do. Ruber drew criticism for the hostile opinions of various authors he expressed in his story introductions within Arkham's Masters of Horror (2000). Rumors of his ill-health circulated for some time; he eventually suffered a stroke and his editorial duties at Arkham House lapsed due to this.

The house's publishing schedule slowed considerably between 2000 and 2006, with only nine books issued—In the Stone House by Barry N. Malzberg (2000); Book of the Dead by E. Hoffmann Price (a collection of memoirs of writers known by Price, 2001); Arkham House's Masters of Horror (ed. Peter Ruber, 2000); The Far Side of Nowhere by Nelson Bond (2002); The Cleansing by John D. Harvey (a horror novel, 2002); Selected Letters of Clark Ashton Smith (ed. Scott Connors, 2003); Cave of a Thousand Tales by Milt Thomas (a biography of pulp writer Hugh B. Cave, 2004); Other Worlds Than Ours, another collection by Nelson Bond (2005); and Evermore (a collection of tales in tribute to Edgar Allan Poe, ed. James Robert Smith & Stephen Mark Rainey, 2006).

In 2005 Arkham House was awarded the World Fantasy Award for Small Press Achievements—the trophy at that time was a bust of H. P. Lovecraft.

In early 2009 it was announced that George Vanderburgh of Battered Silicon Dispatch Box, and Robert Weinberg, would jointly take over the editorial duties at Arkham House. That year Battered Silicon Dispatch Box issued four new volumes of stories by August Derleth under the umbrella title "The Macabre Quarto" under a joint imprint with Arkham House, which constituted the latter's only output since 2006.

In 2010 The Arkham Sampler (1948–49) was reissued in a limited edition (250 sets) two-volume facsimile reprint of the now-rare magazine issued by Arkham House that ran four issues a year 1948–1949. This work was issued by Arkham House co-published with the August Derleth Society. In the same year Jon Lellenberg's novel Baker Street Irregular was issued under the Mycroft and Moran imprint.

== Status ==
George Vanderburgh's blog at Battered Silicon Dispatch Box announced a number of Arkham House titles for 2011 and after (the last being Evermore), none of which had appeared as of January 2017 due to April Derleth's death on March 21, 2011. The publisher's website announced in April 2011 that her children would take over the running of the firm. Danielle Jacobs was named president, and her brother Damon Derleth as vice president; they are also the current owners. George Vanderburgh would continue as house editor, as would Robert Weinberg until his death in September 2016, although the press continues its operations and remains active in managing and reprinting its backlist titles. The publisher has continued to maintain its publishing activities rather than closing the press.

== Other imprints ==
Arkham House published under two additional imprints during its history.

In 1945 the Mycroft & Moran imprint was launched for the publication of weird detective and mystery stories, including Derleth's Solar Pons series. The title of the imprint was inspired by characters from the Sherlock Holmes stories: Sherlock's brother Mycroft Holmes, and the villain Colonel Sebastian Moran. Some Mycroft and Moran titles since 1993 have also been issued by Battered Silicon Dispatch Box.

Arkham also introduced Stanton & Lee Publishers in 1945 with the intention of publishing cartoons by Clare Victor Dwiggins. Stanton & Lee Publishers went on to publish poetry and the regional writings of August Derleth.

August Derleth also sub-contracted certain books which were nominally published by Arkham House to other publishers, including Pellegrini & Cudahy of New York, and Villiers Publications of England.

== Bibliography of works published by Arkham House ==
=== 2010s ===
- The Arkham Sampler (1948–1949), edited by George Vanderburgh and Robert Weinberg (2010)
- Baker Street Irregular, by Jon Lellenberg (2010)

=== 2000s ===
- The Macabre Quarto, by August Derleth
  - vol. 1: Who Shall I Say Is Calling & Other Stories edited by Stephen Dziemianowicz and Robert Weinberg (2009)
  - vol. 2: The Sleepers and other Wakeful Things introduced by Ramsey Campbell (2009)
  - vol. 3: That Is Not Dead introduced by David Drake (2009)
  - vol. 4: August Derleth's Eerie Creatures introduced by Brian Lumley (2009)
- The Shunned House Facsimile, by H. P. Lovecraft and Robert Weinberg (2008)
- Evermore, edited by James Robert Smith and Stephen Mark Rainey (2006)
- Other Worlds Than Ours, by Nelson Bond (2005)
- Cave of a Thousand Tales, by Milt Thomas (2004)
- Selected Letters of Clark Ashton Smith, by Clark Ashton Smith, edited by Scott Connors (2003)
- The Cleansing, by John D. Harvey (2002)
- The Far Side of Nowhere, by Nelson Bond (2002)
- Book of the Dead, by E. Hoffmann Price (2001)
- Arkham's Masters of Horror, edited by Peter Ruber (2000)
- In the Stone House, by Barry N. Malzberg (2000)

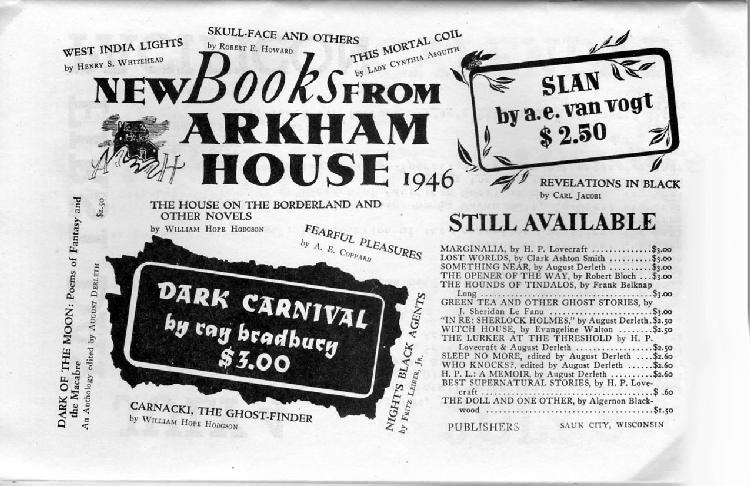
1946 advertisement for Arkham House

=== 1990s ===
- Sixty Years of Arkham House, edited by S. T. Joshi (1999)
- Dragonfly, by Frederic S. Durbin (1999)
- New Horizons, edited by August Derleth (1999)
- Lovecraft Remembered, edited by Peter Cannon (1998)
- Flowers from the Moon and Other Lunacies, by Robert Bloch (1998)
- Voyages by Starlight, by Ian R. MacLeod (1997)
- Synthesis & Other Virtual Realities, by Mary Rosenblum (1996)
- Cthulhu 2000: A Lovecraftian Anthology, edited by James Turner (1995)
- Miscellaneous Writings, by H. P. Lovecraft, edited by S. T. Joshi (1994)
- The Breath of Suspension, by Alexander Jablokov (1994)
- The Aliens of Earth, by Nancy Kress (1993)
- Alone with the Horrors: The Great Short Fiction of Ramsey Campbell 1961–1991, by Ramsey Campbell (1993)
- Meeting in Infinity, by John Kessel (1992)
- Lord Kelvin's Machine, by James P. Blaylock (1992)
- Gravity's Angels, by Michael Swanwick (1991)
- The Ends of the Earth, by Lucius Shepard (1990)
- Her Smoke Rose Up Forever, by James Tiptree, Jr. (1990)

=== 1980s ===
- Tales of the Cthulhu Mythos, by H. P. Lovecraft and Divers Hands (1989)
- Crystal Express, by Bruce Sterling (1989)
- The Horror in the Museum and Other Revisions, by H. P. Lovecraft (1989)
- Memories of the Space Age, by J. G. Ballard (1988)
- A Rendezvous in Averoigne, by Clark Ashton Smith (1988)
- Polyphemus, by Michael Shea (1987)
- The Jaguar Hunter, by Lucius Shepard (1987)
- Tales of the Quintana Roo, by James Tiptree, Jr. (1986)
- Dreams of Dark and Light: The Great Short Fiction of Tanith Lee, by Tanith Lee (1986)
- Dagon and Other Macabre Tales, by H. P. Lovecraft (1986)
- At the Mountains of Madness and Other Novels, by H. P. Lovecraft (1985)
- The Dunwich Horror and Others, by H. P. Lovecraft (1985)
- Lovecraft's Book, by Richard A. Lupoff (1985)
- Who Made Stevie Crye?, by Michael Bishop (1984)
- Watchers at the Strait Gate, by Russell Kirk (1984)
- One Winter in Eden, by Michael Bishop (1984)
- The Zanzibar Cat, by Joanna Russ (1983)
- The Wind from a Burning Woman, by Greg Bear (1983)
- The House of the Wolf, by Basil Copper (1983)
- The Darkling, by David Kesterton (1982)
- Blooded on Arachne, by Michael Bishop (1982)
- Tales from the Nightside, by Charles L. Grant (1981)
- Collected Poems, by Richard L. Tierney (1981)
- The Third Grave, by David Case (1981)
- New Tales of the Cthulhu Mythos, edited by Ramsey Campbell (1980)
- Necropolis, by Basil Copper (1980)

=== 1970s ===
- The Black Book of Clark Ashton Smith, by Clark Ashton Smith (1979)
- The Princess of All Lands, by Russell Kirk (1979)
- In the Mist and Other Uncanny Encounters, by Elizabeth Walter (1979)
- Half in Shadow, by Mary Elizabeth Counselman (1978)
- Born to Exile, by Phyllis Eisenstein (1978)
- In Mayan Splendor, by Frank Belknap Long (1977)
- The Horror at Oakdeene and Others, by Brian Lumley (1977)
- And Afterward, the Dark, by Basil Copper (1977)
- Kecksies and Other Twilight Tales, by Marjorie Bowen (1976)
- The Height of the Scream, by Ramsey Campbell (1976)
- Literary Swordsmen and Sorcerers, by L. Sprague de Camp (1976)
- Dwellers in Darkness, by August Derleth (1976)
- Selected Letters of H. P. Lovecraft V (1934–1937), by H. P. Lovecraft (1976)
- Selected Letters of H. P. Lovecraft IV (1932–1934), by H. P. Lovecraft (1976)
- Dreams from R'lyeh, by Lin Carter (1975)
- The Purcell Papers: four stories from the original collection (The Purcell Papers), along with nine other Le Fanu short stories and a pastiche of Le Fanu, "The Churchyard Yew," written by August Derleth using Le Fanu's name as a pseudonym
- Nameless Places, edited by Gerald W. Page (1975)
- The House of the Worm, by Gary Myers (1975)
- Harrigan's File, by August Derleth (1975)
- Xélucha and Others, by M. P. Shiel (1975)
- Howard Phillips Lovecraft: Dreamer on the Nightside, by Frank Belknap Long (1975)
- The Watchers Out of Time and Others, by H. P. Lovecraft and August Derleth (1974)
- Collected Ghost Stories, by Mary E. Wilkins-Freeman (1974)
- Beneath the Moors, by Brian Lumley (1974)
- Stories of Darkness and Dread, by Joseph Payne Brennan (1973)
- From Evil's Pillow, by Basil Copper (1973)
- Demons by Daylight, by Ramsey Campbell (1973)
- The Rim of the Unknown, by Frank Belknap Long (1972)
- Disclosures in Scarlet, by Carl Jacobi (1972)
- The Arkham Collector: Volume I, edited by August Derleth (1972)
- The Caller of the Black, by Brian Lumley (1971)
- Selected Letters of H. P. Lovecraft III (1929–1931), by H. P. Lovecraft (1971)
- Songs and Sonnets Atlantean, by Donald S. Fryer (1971)
- The Arkham Collector Number Ten: Summer, 1971
- Dark Things, edited by August Derleth (1971)
- Eight Tales, by Walter de la Mare (1971)
- The Arkham Collector Number Nine: Spring, 1971
- The Face in the Mirror, by Denys Val Baker (1971)
- Selected Poems, by Clark Ashton Smith (1971)
- The Arkham Collector Number Eight: Winter, 1971
- The Horror in the Museum and Other Revisions, by H. P. Lovecraft (1970)
- The Arkham Collector Number Seven: Summer, 1970
- Other Dimensions, by Clark Ashton Smith (1970)
- Demons and Dinosaurs, by L. Sprague de Camp (1970)
- Thirty Years of Arkham House, 1939–69: A History and Bibliography, prepared by August Derleth (1970)
- The Arkham Collector Number Six: Winter, 1970

=== 1960s ===
- The Folsom Flint and Other Curious Tales, by David H. Keller (1969)
- Tales of the Cthulhu Mythos, by H. P. Lovecraft and Others (1969)
- The Arkham Collector Number Five: Summer, 1969
- The Arkham Collector Number Four: Winter, 1969
- The Arkham Collector Number Three: Summer, 1968
- Nightmares and Daydreams, by Nelson Bond (1968)
- Selected Letters of H. P. Lovecraft II (1925–1929), by H. P. Lovecraft (1968)
- The Green Round, by Arthur Machen (1968)
- The Arkham Collector Number Two: Winter, 1968
- Strange Gateways, by E. Hoffmann Price (1967)
- Three Tales of Horror, by H. P. Lovecraft (1967)
- The Mind Parasites, by Colin Wilson (1967)
- The Arkham Collector Number One: Summer, 1967
- Travellers by Night, edited by August Derleth (1967)
- Deep Waters, by William Hope Hodgson (1967)
- Black Medicine, by Arthur J. Burks (1966)
- Colonel Markesan and Less Pleasant People, by August Derleth and Mark Schorer (1966)
- The Dark Brotherhood and Other Pieces, by H. P. Lovecraft & divers hands (1966)
- Strange Harvest, by Donald Wandrei (1965)
- Something Breathing, by Stanley McNail (1965)
- The Quick and the Dead, by Vincent Starrett (1965)
- Dagon and Other Macabre Tales, by H. P. Lovecraft (1965)
- Poems in Prose, by Clark Ashton Smith (1965)
- Selected Letters of H. P. Lovecraft I (1911–1924), by H. P. Lovecraft (1965)
- Tales of Science and Sorcery, by Clark Ashton Smith (1964)
- Nightmare Need, by Joseph Payne Brennan (1964)
- Portraits in Moonlight, by Carl Jacobi (1964)
- At the Mountains of Madness and Other Novels, by H. P. Lovecraft (1964)
- Over the Edge, edited by August Derleth (1964)
- Poems for Midnight, by Donald Wandrei (1964)
- The Inhabitant of the Lake and Less Welcome Tenants, by J. Ramsey Campbell (1964)
- The Dark Man and Others, by Robert E. Howard (1963)
- Mr. George and Other Odd Persons, by Stephen Grendon (1963)
- Who Fears the Devil?, by Manly Wade Wellman (1963)
- Autobiography: Some Notes on a Nonentity, by H. P. Lovecraft: annotated by August Derleth (1963)
- The Dunwich Horror and Others, by H. P. Lovecraft (1963)
- Collected Poems, by H. P. Lovecraft (1963)
- The Horror from the Hills, by Frank Belknap Long (1963)
- 100 Books by August Derleth, by August Derleth (1962)
- The Trail of Cthulhu, by August Derleth (1962)
- Dark Mind, Dark Heart, edited by August Derleth (1962)
- Lonesome Places, by August Derleth (1962)
- Dreams and Fancies, by H. P. Lovecraft (1962)
- The Shunned House, by H. P. Lovecraft (1961)
- Fire and Sleet and Candlelight, edited by August Derleth (1961)
- Strayers from Sheol, by H. Russell Wakefield (1961)
- Invaders from the Dark, by Greye La Spina (1960)
- Pleasant Dreams: Nightmares, by Robert Bloch (1960)
- The Abominations of Yondo, by Clark Ashton Smith (1960)

=== 1950s ===
- The Shuttered Room and Other Pieces, by H. P. Lovecraft and Divers Hands (1959)
- Some Notes on H. P. Lovecraft, by August Derleth (1959)
- Arkham House: The First 20 Years, by August Derleth (1959)
- Nine Horrors and a Dream, by Joseph Payne Brennan (1958)
- The Mask of Cthulhu, by August Derleth (1958)
- Spells and Philtres, by Clark Ashton Smith (1958)
- Always Comes Evening, by Robert E. Howard (1957)
- The Survivor and Others, by H. P. Lovecraft and August Derleth (1957)
- The Feasting Dead, by John Metcalfe (1954)
- The Curse of Yig, by Zealia Bishop (1953)
- Night's Yawning Peal: A Ghostly Company, edited by August Derleth (1952)
- Tales from Underwood, by David H. Keller (1952)
- The Dark Chateau, by Clark Ashton Smith (1951)
- A Hornbook for Witches, by Leah Bodine Drake (1950)

=== 1940s ===
- The Throne of Saturn, by S. Fowler Wright (1949)
- The Arkham Sampler, Volume II, Number Four: Autumn, 1949
- The Arkham Sampler, Volume II, Number Three: Summer, 1949
- The Arkham Sampler, Volume II, Number Two: Spring, 1949
- The Arkham Sampler, Volume II, Number One: Winter, 1949
- Something About Cats and Other Pieces, by H. P. Lovecraft (1949)
- Not Long for this World, by August Derleth (1948)
- Genius Loci and Other Tales, by Clark Ashton Smith (1948)
- The Arkham Sampler, Volume I, Number Four: Autumn, 1948
- The Arkham Sampler, Volume I, Number Three: Summer, 1948
- The Arkham Sampler, Volume I, Number Two: Spring, 1948
- The Arkham Sampler, Volume I, Number One: Winter, 1948
- Roads, by Seabury Quinn (1948)
- The Fourth Book of Jorkens, by Lord Dunsany (1948)
- The Web of Easter Island, by Donald Wandrei (1948)
- The Travelling Grave and Other Stories, by L. P. Hartley (1948)
- Night's Black Agents, by Fritz Leiber, Jr. (1947)
- Revelations in Black, by Carl Jacobi (1947)
- Dark Carnival, by Ray Bradbury (1947)
- Dark of the Moon: Poems of Fantasy and the Macabre, edited by August Derleth (1947)
- This Mortal Coil, by Cynthia Asquith (1947)
- Slan, by A. E. van Vogt (1946)
- The Clock Strikes Twelve, by H. Russell Wakefield (1946)
- Fearful Pleasures, by A. E. Coppard (1946)
- West India Lights, by Henry S. Whitehead (1946)
- Skull-Face and Others, by Robert E. Howard (1946)
- The House on the Borderland and Other Novels, by William Hope Hodgson (1946)
- The Doll and One Other, by Algernon Blackwood (1946)
- The Hounds of Tindalos, by Frank Belknap Long (1946)
- The Lurker at the Threshold, by H. P. Lovecraft and August Derleth (1945)
- Green Tea and Other Ghost Stories, by J. Sheridan Le Fanu (1945)
- Witch House, by Evangeline Walton (1945)
- The Opener of the Way, by Robert Bloch (1945)
- Something Near, by August Derleth (1945)
- Marginalia by H. P. Lovecraft (1944)
- Lost Worlds, by Clark Ashton Smith (1944)
- Jumbee and Other Uncanny Tales, by Henry S. Whitehead (1944)
- The Eye and the Finger, by Donald Wandrei (1944)
- Beyond the Wall of Sleep, by H. P. Lovecraft (1943)
- Out of Space and Time, by Clark Ashton Smith (1942)
- Someone in the Dark, by August Derleth (1941)

=== 1939 ===
- The Outsider and Others, by H. P. Lovecraft (1939)
