= The Shunned House =

1924 horror novella by H. P. Lovecraft

- Short story by H. P. Lovecraft
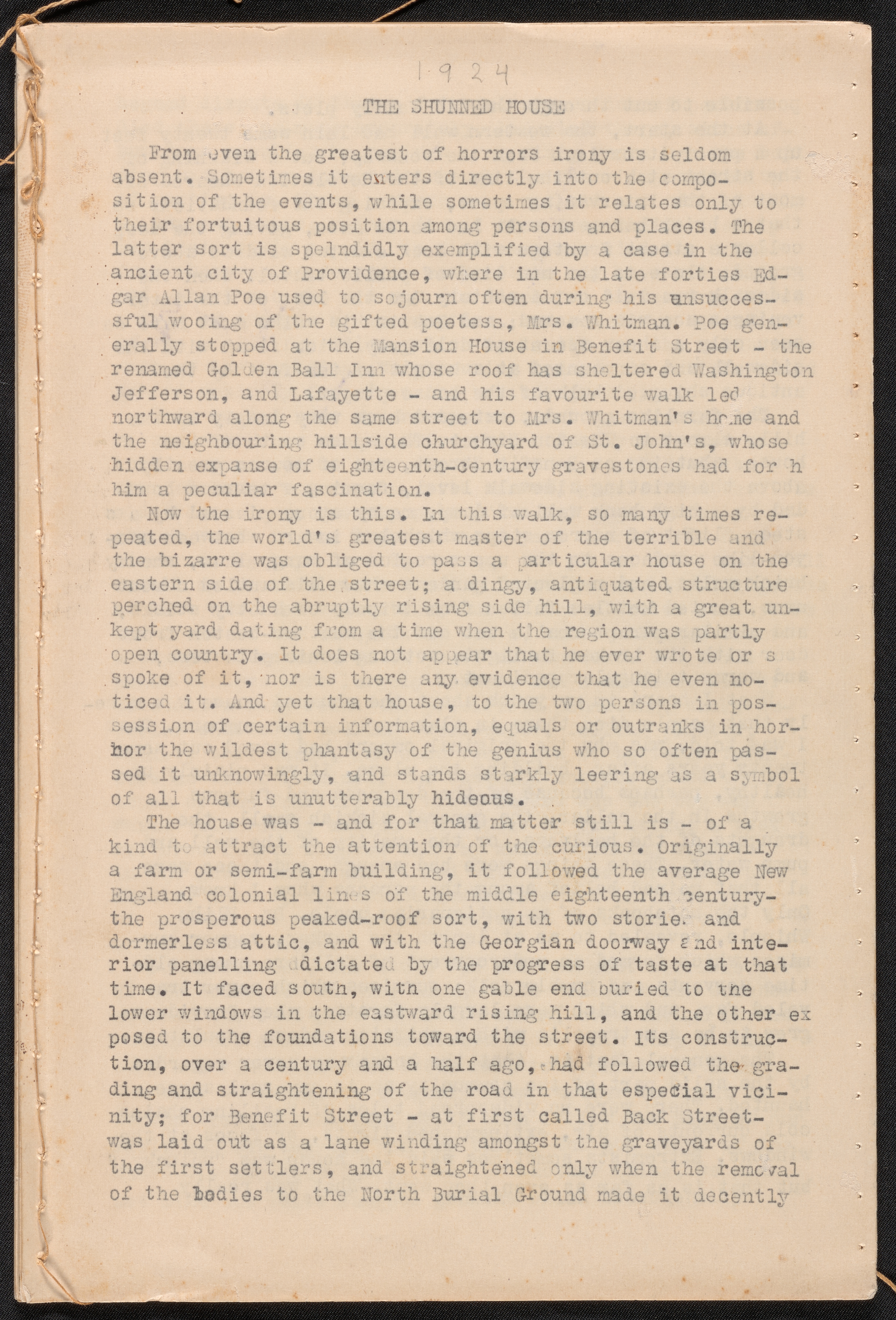

Text available at Wikisource
- Country: United States
- Language: English
- Genre: Horror

Publication
- Published in: Weird Tales
- Publication type: Periodical
- Media type: Print (Magazine)
- Publication date: October 1937

"The Shunned House" is a horror fiction novelette by American author H. P. Lovecraft, written on October 16–19, 1924. It was first published in the October 1937 issue of Weird Tales.

== Inspiration ==
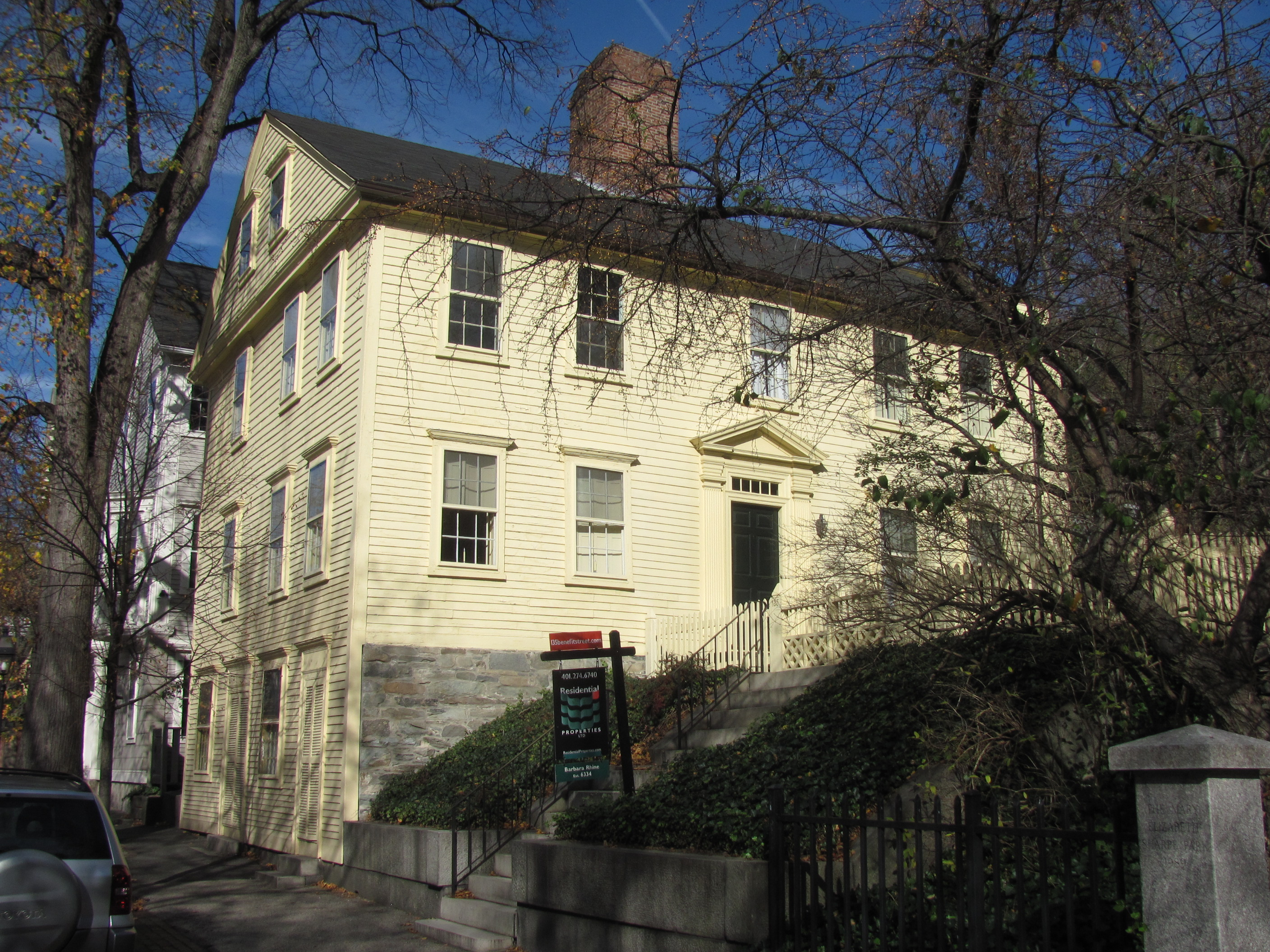
135 Benefit Street, Providence, Rhode Island

The Shunned House of the title is based on an actual house in Providence, Rhode Island, built around 1763 and still standing at 135 Benefit Street. Lovecraft was familiar with the house because his aunt Lillian Clark lived there in 1919/20 as a companion to Mrs. H. C. Babbit. However, it was another house in Elizabeth, New Jersey that actually compelled Lovecraft to write the story. As he wrote in a letter:

On the northeast corner of Bridge Street and Elizabeth Avenue is a terrible old house—a hellish place where night-black deeds must have been done in the early seventeen-hundreds—with a blackish unpainted surface, unnaturally steep roof, and an outside flight of stairs leading to the second story, suffocatingly embowered in a tangle of ivy so dense that one cannot but imagine it accursed or corpse-fed. It reminded me of the Babbit House in Benefit Street.... Later its image came up again with renewed vividness, finally causing me to write a new horror story with its scene in Providence and with the Babbit House as its basis.

== Plot ==
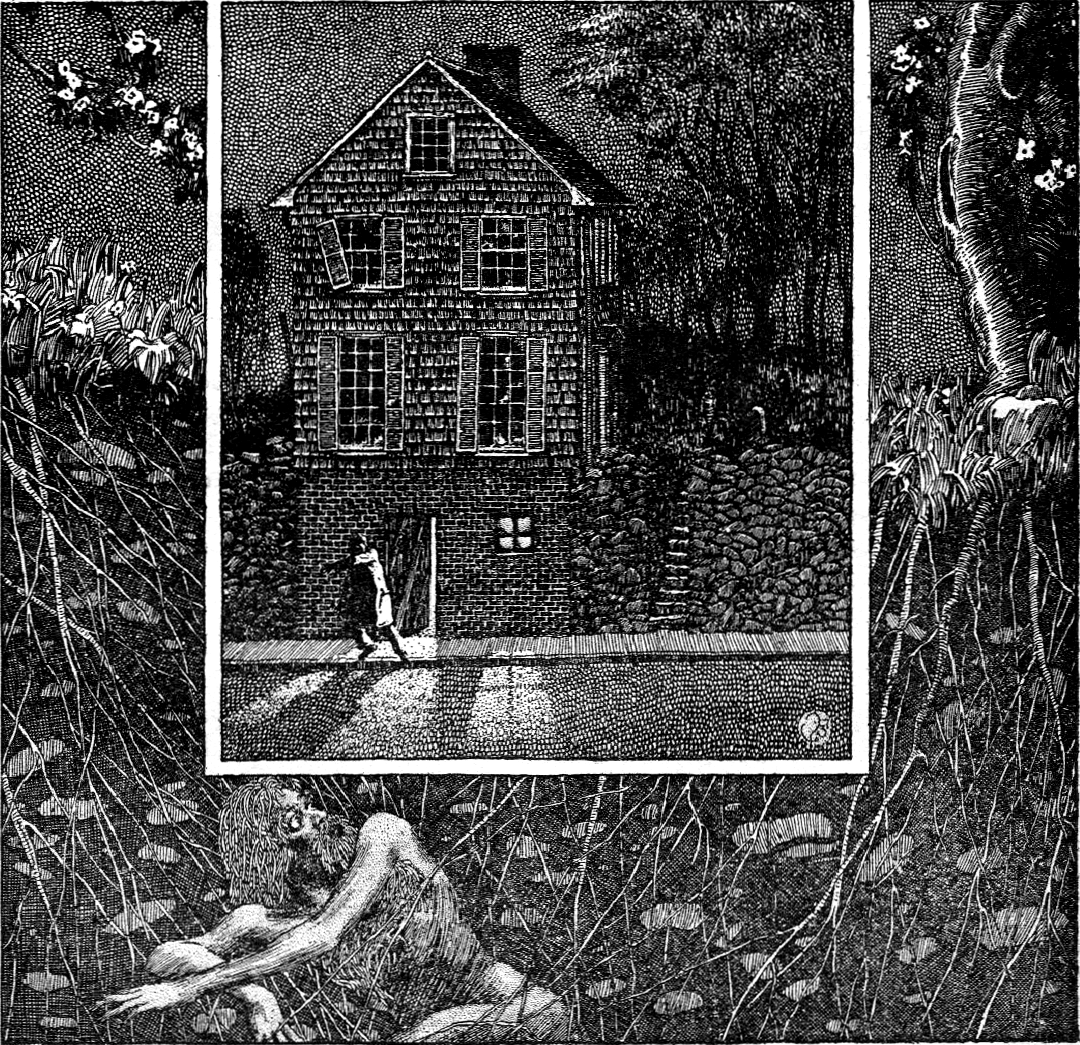
Original illustration by Virgil Finlay accompanying the publication in Weird Tales (October 1937, volume 30, issue 4).

For many years, the narrator and his uncle, Dr. Elihu Whipple, have nurtured a fascination with an old abandoned house on Benefit Street. Dr. Whipple has made extensive use of records tracking the mysterious, yet apparently coincidental, sickness and death of many who have lived in the house for over one hundred years. They are also puzzled by the strange weeds growing in the yard, as well as an unexplained foul smell and whitish phosphorescent fungi growing in the cellar. There, the narrator discovers a strange, yellowish vapour in the basement, which seems to be coupled with a moldy outline of a huddled human form on the floor. The narrator and his uncle decide to spend the night in the house, investigating the possibility of some supernatural force. They set up both cots and chairs in the cellar, arm themselves with military flamethrowers, and outfit a modified Crookes tube in the hopes of destroying any supernatural presence they might find.

When Dr. Whipple naps, he tosses and turns and starts babbling in French until he suddenly awakes. He tells the narrator that he had strange visions of lying in an open pit, inside a house with constantly shifting features, while faces stared down at him. Many of the faces were those of the Harris family, whose members died in the house. When the narrator sleeps, he is awakened by a horrific scream. He sees a revolting yellowish "corpse-light" bubbling up from the floor, which stares at him with many eyes before vanishing in a wisp through the chimney. He finds his uncle transformed into a monster with "blackened, decaying features" and dripping claws. He turns on the Crookes tube, but seeing that it has no effect, escapes the house through the cellar door as his uncle's body dissolves, transforming into a multitude of faces of those who died in the house as it melts. The narrator returns the next day to find his equipment intact, but no body.

The narrator hatches a plan. He orders a military gas mask, digging tools, and six carboys of sulfuric acid to be delivered to the cellar door of the house. He digs into the earthen floor of the cellar, turning up fungous yellow ooze, and arranges the barrels of acid around the hole in the belief that he will happen upon some kind of monstrous creature. Eventually, he uncovers a soft, blue-white, translucent tube, bent in half and two feet in diameter at its widest point. He frantically climbs out of the neck-deep hole, and dumps in four barrels of acid, realizing that he had found the elbow of a gigantic monster. The narrator faints after emptying the fourth barrel. When he awakens, the narrator empties the two remaining barrels, to no effect, replaces the dirt, and finds that the strange fungus has turned to harmless ash. He mourns his uncle, but is relieved to be sure that the horrible creature is finally dead. The narrator records that the house has subsequently been rented to another family, and that the house now appears completely normal.

== Characters ==
- Elihu Whipple: Described as "a sane, conservative physician of the old school...a bachelor; a white-haired, clean-shaven, old-fashioned gentleman, and a local historian of note." Peter Cannon writes that Whipple "is probably a composite portrait of Lovecraft's two learned uncles-in-law and maternal grandfather"; the grandfather's name was Whipple Phillips. Dr. Whipple's home—the "Georgian homestead with knocker and iron-railed steps, balanced eerily on the steep ascent of North Court Street beside the ancient brick court and colony house", with its "damp, low-ceiled library with the musty white panelling, heavy carved overmantel and small-paned, vine-shaded windows"—is based on Cushing House at 40 North Court Street, built in 1737, the oldest home on College Hill.
- Etienne Roulet: A Huguenot from Caude, near Angers, France, who settled in East Greenwich, Rhode Island in 1686 and moved to Providence in 1696; the Shunned House was built on the site of his family's graveyard. According to the story, "The family of Roulet had possessed an abnormal affinity for outer circles of entity — dark spheres which for normal folk hold only repulsion and terror." Etienne is said to have been "apt...at reading queer books and drawing queer diagrams." His son, Paul Roulet, is described as a "surly fellow" of "erratic conduct"; "old wives" intimated that "his prayers were neither uttered at the proper time nor directed at the proper object." The story's narrator suspects that the family is connected to Jacques Roulet of Caude, who was condemned to death for lycanthropy in 1598 before being confined to an asylum. Jacques Roulet was a real person, whom Lovecraft had read about in John Fiske's Myths and Myth-Makers.

== Publication ==
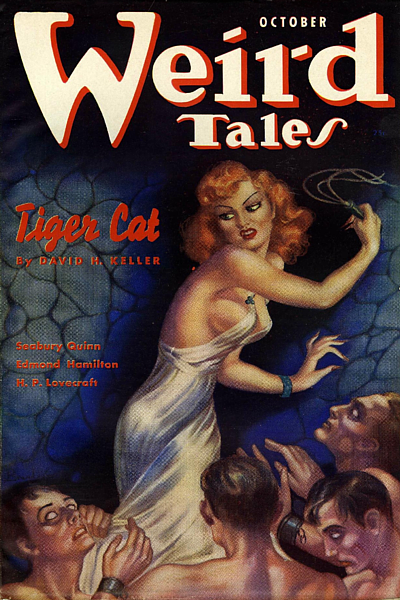
Issue of Weird Tales that The Shunned House first appeared in, October 1937.

"The Shunned House", with an introduction by Frank Belknap Long, was to have been Lovecraft's first published book. Approximately 250 copies were printed in 1928 by W. Paul Cook for Recluse Press. However, the sheets were not bound at that time.

Approximately 150 sets of unbound sheets eventually found their way into the possession of Arkham House in 1959, where they were offered for sale in an unbound state. About 50 copies were sold in that state, simply folded and with no cover. August Derleth had the remaining 100 copies bound as an official publication of Arkham House and offered for sale in 1961. The book was not jacketed and contains the Arkham House imprint only on the spine. The genuine item, watermarked "Canterbury," is the rarest book associated with Arkham House (several variants exist involving the copyright notice). It is considered the "holy grail" for Arkham House collectors (discounting the hardback state of Arkham House: The First 20 Years as well as the first printing of the second Arkham House edition of "The Shunned House" in 2008 which had a print run of only 117 copies and is now likewise out of print). However, forgeries of the bound 1961 Shunned House exist in various states; most have the watermark 'Chantry' and some are in red boards and have the spine printed in European from bottom to top, unlike the Arkham House version.

== Reception ==
Robert Weinberg described "The Shunned House" as "one of Lovecraft's best short novels".

== Other media ==
- The Shunned House features prominently in Lovecraftian: The Shipwright Circle by Steven Philip Jones. The Lovecraftian series reimagines the tales of H. P. Lovecraft into one universe.
- The Shunned House also features prominently in Joseph Payne Brennan's booklength novella Act of Providence (Donald M. Grant, Publisher, 1979) as the occult detective Lucius Leffing and Brennan, his offsider/narrator, investigate strange goings-on at the first World Fantasy Convention.

== See also ==
- Mercy Brown vampire incident

== Sources ==
- Lovecraft, Howard P. (1999) [1924]. "The Shunned House". In S. T. Joshi; Peter Cannon (eds.). More Annotated Lovecraft (1st ed.). New York City, NY: Dell. ISBN 0-440-50875-4. With explanatory footnotes.
- Jaffery, Sheldon (1989). The Arkham House Companion. Mercer Island, WA: Starmont House, Inc. pp. 58–59. ISBN 1-55742-005-X.
- Chalker, Jack L.; Mark Owings (1998). The Science-Fantasy Publishers: A Bibliographic History, 1923-1998. Westminster, MD and Baltimore: Mirage Press, Ltd. pp. 38–39.
- Joshi, S.T. (1999). Sixty Years of Arkham House: A History and Bibliography. Sauk City, WI: Arkham House. p. 75. ISBN 0-87054-176-5.
- Nielsen, Leon (2004). Arkham House Books: A Collector's Guide. Jefferson, NC and London: McFarland & Company, Inc. p. 84. ISBN 0-7864-1785-4.
- Weinberg, Robert (1977). The Weird Tales Story. West Lynn, OR: FAX Collector's Editions. p. 42. ISBN 1-58715-101-4.
