= The Transition of Juan Romero =

1919 short story by H. P. Lovecraft

- Short story by H. P. Lovecraft
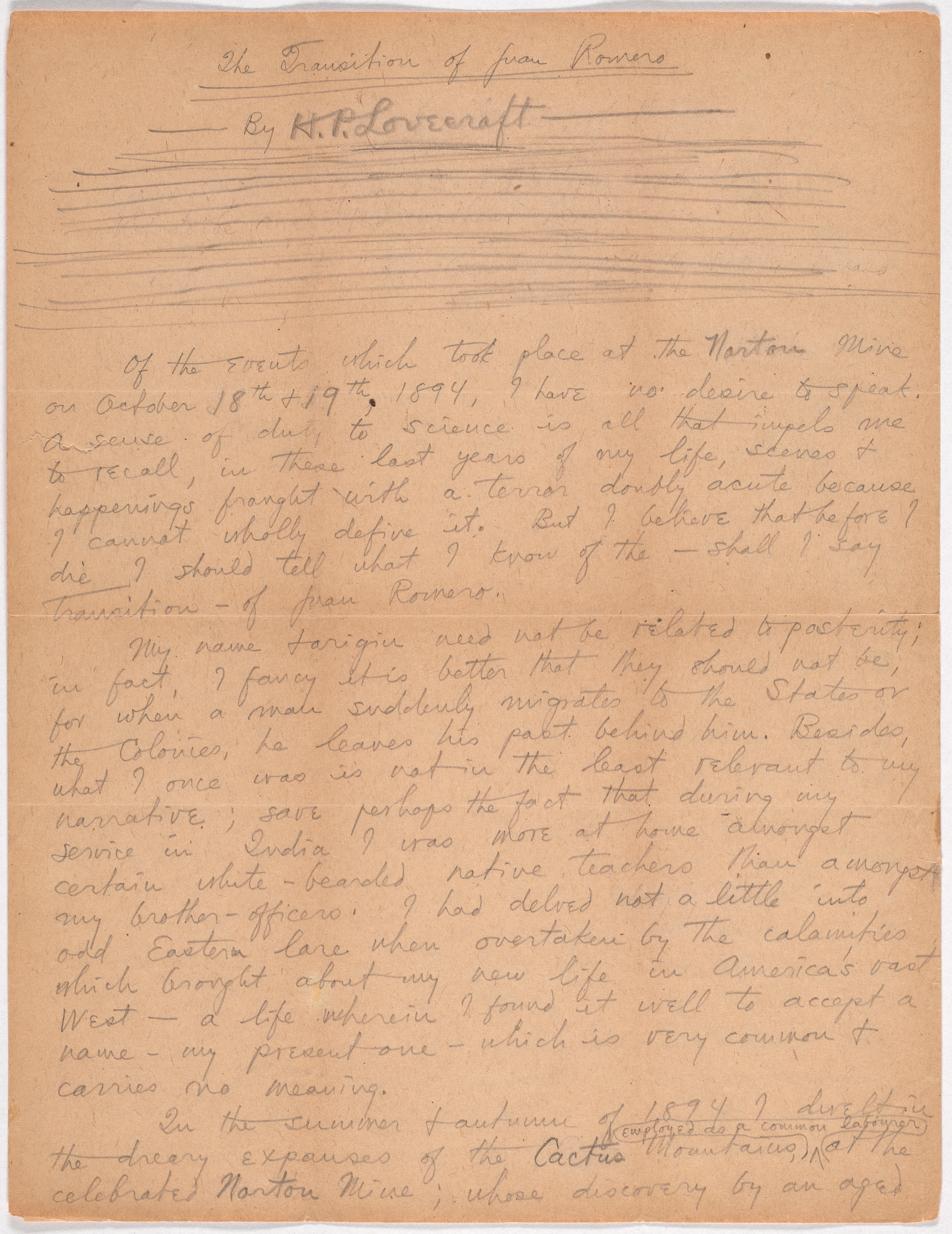
- The Transition of Juan Romero

Text available at Wikisource
- Country: United States
- Language: English
- Genre: Horror short story

Publication
- Published in: Marginalia
- Publisher: Arkham House
- Publication date: 1944

"The Transition of Juan Romero" is a short story by American horror fiction writer H. P. Lovecraft, written on September 16, 1919, and first published in the 1944 Arkham House volume Marginalia.

== Plot ==
The story involves a mine that uncovers a very deep chasm, too deep for any sounding lines to hit bottom. The night after the discovery of the abyss the narrator and one of the mine's workers, a Mexican called Juan Romero, venture together inside the mine, drawn against their will by a mysterious rhythmical throbbing in the ground. Romero reaches the abyss first and is swallowed by it. The narrator peers over the edge, sees something – "but God, I dare not tell you what I saw!" and loses consciousness. The next morning, the narrator and the deceased Romero are both found in their bunks. Other miners swear that neither of them left their cabin that night. The chasm has vanished as well.

== Other details ==
The story was a private illustrative exercise, meant only for the eyes of his small circle of correspondents. Written in less than a day, it was meant to quickly demonstrate what might be done with a desert setting that had been used in what Lovecraft called a "dull yarn" of a story (now lost) by 'Phil Mac' (Prof. Philip Bayaud McDonald).

Lovecraft seems to have disavowed the story early in his writing career. He did not allow it to be published in the small press during his lifetime, and it does not appear on most lists of his stories. He seems not to have shown the story to anyone until, toward the end of his life, Robert H. Barlow badgered him into sending him the manuscript so that Barlow could prepare a typescript of it.

Huitzilopochtli, a Mesoamerican deity associated with human sacrifice, is mentioned, indicating that Juan Romero's transition may have been related to a sacrifice ritual.
