= He (short story) =

1925 short story by H. P. Lovecraft

- Short story by H. P. Lovecraft
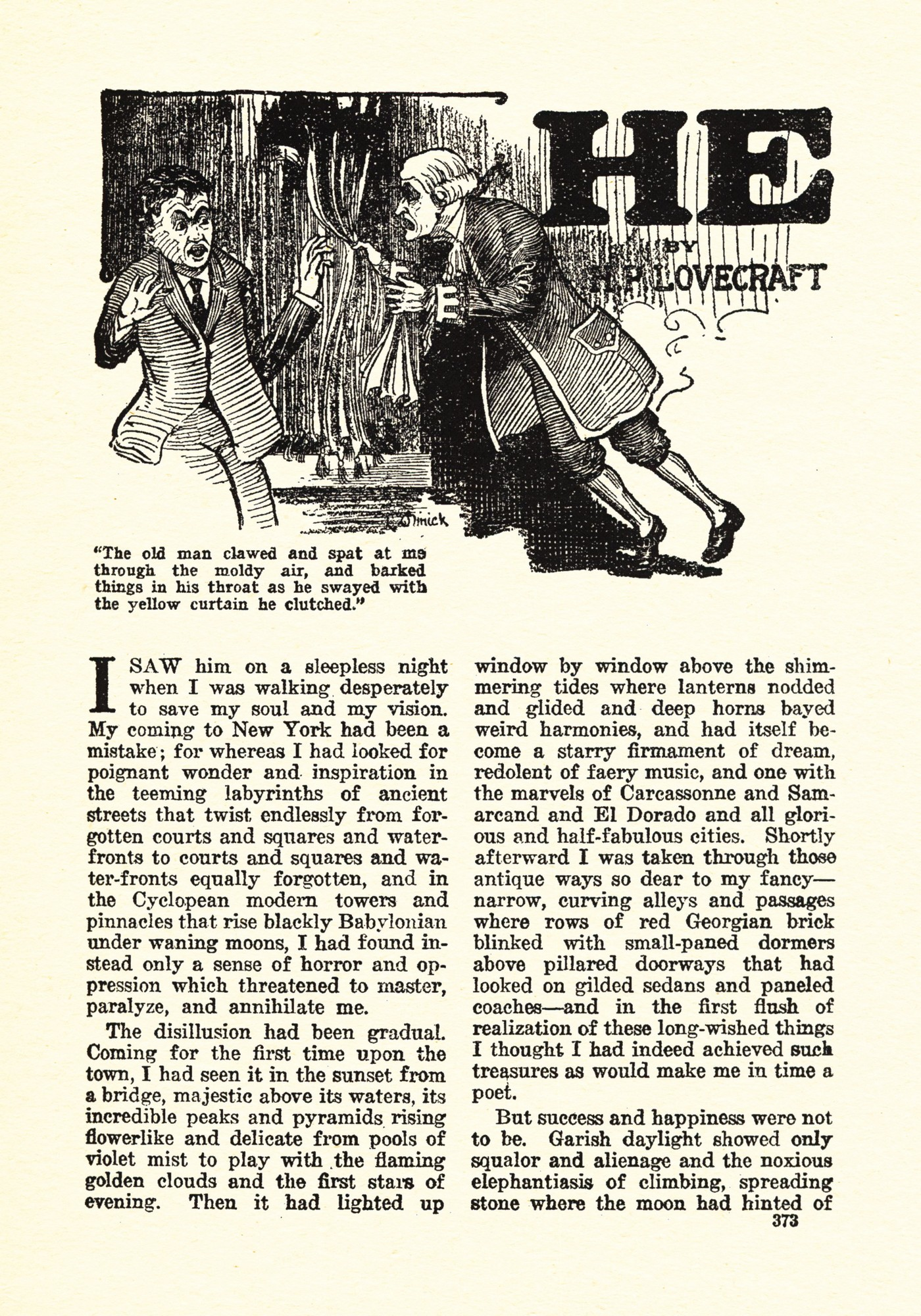
- Title page of "He" as it appeared in Weird Tales, September 1926. Illustration by G. O. Olinick.

Text available at Wikisource
- Country: United States
- Language: English
- Genre: Horror short story

Publication
- Published in: Weird Tales
- Publication type: Periodical
- Media type: Print (magazine)
- Publication date: September 1926

"He" is a short story by American horror writer H. P. Lovecraft. Written August 1925, it was first published in Weird Tales, September 1926.

== Plot ==
The story's anonymous narrator has moved from New England to New York City, and greatly regrets it. One night, while wandering through a historic part of Greenwich Village, he happens upon a man dressed in garments from the 18th century. The man offers to show the narrator the secrets of the town.

The man brings the narrator into his home. There, he tells him the story of a squire who bargained with Native Americans for the secrets of their rituals concerning time and space, which were practiced on the land where the squire had recently taken up residence. After learning these secrets, the squire killed the Native Americans by giving them "monstrous bad rum". Within a week all of them were dead, and he alone had their secret knowledge. The man shows the narrator visions of the city's past and future so terrifying that he begins to scream wildly. The screams rouse the spirits of the Native Americans to take vengeance on the man, who is the same squire from 1768.

== Inspiration ==
The story "He" was written after an all-night tour of the remnants of Old New York; by 7 a.m. the next morning, Lovecraft had reached Elizabeth, New Jersey, by ferry, where he bought a dime composition book and wrote the story in Elizabeth's Scott Park.

Lovecraft had moved to New York City in March 1924 for his short-lived marriage to Sonia Greene. He moved back to Providence, Rhode Island in April 1926, having developed a thorough aversion to New York. The opening paragraphs of "He" are believed to be largely autobiographical, expressing Lovecraft's own feelings about the city:

My coming to New York had been a mistake; for whereas I had looked for poignant wonder and inspiration in the teeming labyrinths of ancient streets that twist endlessly from forgotten courts and squares and waterfronts to courts and squares and waterfronts equally forgotten, and in the Cyclopean modern towers and pinnacles that rise blackly Babylonian under waning moons, I had found instead only a sense of horror and oppression which threatened to master, paralyze, and annihilate me.

Lovecraft's disgust for New York stemmed in large part from his racist attitudes, which are also reflected in "He"'s narrator:

[T]he throngs of people that seethed through the flume-like streets were squat, swarthy strangers with hardened faces and narrow eyes, shrewd strangers without dreams and without kinship to the scenes about them, who could never mean aught to a blue-eyed man of the old folk, with the love of fair green lanes and white New England village steeples in his heart.

The court off Greenwich Village's Perry Street actually exists; Lovecraft learned of its existence in a New York Evening Post article of August 29, 1924. The stranger's house is apparently based on a mansion on the block bounded by Perry, Bleecker, Charles and West 4th streets, built as early as 1744 and demolished in 1865.

A suggested literary model for "He" is Lord Dunsany's The Chronicles of Rodriguez, in which a wizard displays visions of past and future wars in successive windows.
