= Thirty Years of Arkham House, 1939–69 =

Book by August Derleth

Thirty Years of Arkham House, 1939–1969: A History and Bibliography
- Dust-jacket design by Frank Utpatel for Thirty Years of Arkham House, 1939–1969: A History and Bibliography
- Author: August Derleth
- Cover artist: Frank Utpatel
- Language: English
- Genre: Bibliography
- Publisher: Arkham House
- Publication date: 1970
- Publication place: United States
- Media type: Print (Hardback)
- Pages: 99 pp

Thirty Years of Arkham House, 1939–1969: A History and Bibliography is a bibliography of books published from 1939 to 1969 under the imprints of Arkham House, Mycroft & Moran and Stanton & Lee. It was released in 1970 by Arkham House in an edition of 2,137 copies.
