= Alexander Jablokov =

American writer

- Born: April 29, 1956 (age 70); Chicago, Illinois, U.S.
- Occupations: Novelist, short story writer
- Writing career
- Genre: Science fiction

Alexander Jablokov (born April 29, 1956) is an American writer and novelist.

== Career ==
He worked for years as a communications engineer in Boston before becoming a full-time writer in 1988; however, he later took a day job as a marketing executive.

== Bibliography ==
=== Novels ===
- Carve the Sky. New York: William Morrow & Co., 1991. ISBN 0-688-10324-3
- A Deeper Sea. New York: William Morrow & Co., 1992. ISBN 0-688-11113-0
- Nimbus. New York: William Morrow & Co., 1993. ISBN 0-688-11114-9
- River of Dust. New York: Avon Eos, 1996. ISBN 0-380-97264-6
- Deepdrive. New York: Avon Eos, 1998. ISBN 0-380-97636-6
- Brain Thief. New York: Tor Books, 2009. ISBN 978-0-7653-6172-1

=== Short fiction ===
==== Short fiction collections ====
- The Breath of Suspension (Arkham House, Sauk City, Wisconsin, 1994) ISBN 0-87054-167-6

==== List of uncollected short fiction ====
Title	Year	First published	Reprinted/collected	Notes
Feral Moon	2013	Jablokov, Alexander (March 2013). "Feral Moon". Asimov's Science Fiction. 37 (3): 72–105.		Novella
The Instructive Tale of the Archeologist and His Wife	2014	Jablokov, Alexander (July 2014). "The Instructive Tale of the Archeologist and His @ife". Asimov's Science Fiction. 38 (7): 30–39.		
