= The Book (short story) =

H. P. Lovecraft short story

- Short story by H. P. Lovecraft

Text available at Wikisource
- Country: United States
- Language: English
- Genres: Fantasy, horror

Publication
- Published in: Leaves
- Publication type: Literary journal
- Media type: Print
- Publication date: 1938

"The Book" is an unfinished short story by American horror fiction writer H. P. Lovecraft, believed to have been written in late 1933. It was first published in the journal Leaves in 1938, after Lovecraft's death.

In the story fragment, the narrator is given an ancient book by a strange bookseller, and when he takes it home and examines it, weird and sinister events ensue.

In October 1933, Lovecraft wrote in a letter:

I am at a sort of standstill in writing—disgusted at much of my older work, and uncertain as to avenues of improvement. In recent weeks I have done a tremendous amount of experimenting with different styles and perspectives, but have destroyed most of the results.

The H. P. Lovecraft Encyclopedia suggests that "The Book" was one of the undestroyed experiments—an attempt to translate Lovecraft's poem sequence Fungi from Yuggoth into prose. (The completed fragment corresponds to the first three sonnets, which form more of a coherent narrative than the rest of the sequence.)

"The Black Tome of Alsophocus", first published in New Tales of the Cthulhu Mythos (1980), is an attempt by Martin S. Warnes to complete "The Book". Warnes turns the fragment into a tale of possession by Nyarlathotep.

In 2019, the latter Warnes completion was adapted into a short film of the same name. The aforementioned film was featured in 2020 Edition of the H.P. Lovecraft Film Festival & CthulhuCon and it its included in the Festival's Best of 2020 Short Film Collection bluray.
