= The Descendant (short story) =

1927 story fragment by H. P. Lovecraft

- Short story by H. P. Lovecraft

Text available at Wikisource
- Country: United States
- Language: English
- Genre: Horror

Publication
- Published in: Leaves
- Publication date: 1938

"The Descendant" is a horror story fragment by American writer H. P. Lovecraft, believed to have been written in 1927. It was first published in the journal Leaves in 1938, after Lovecraft's death.

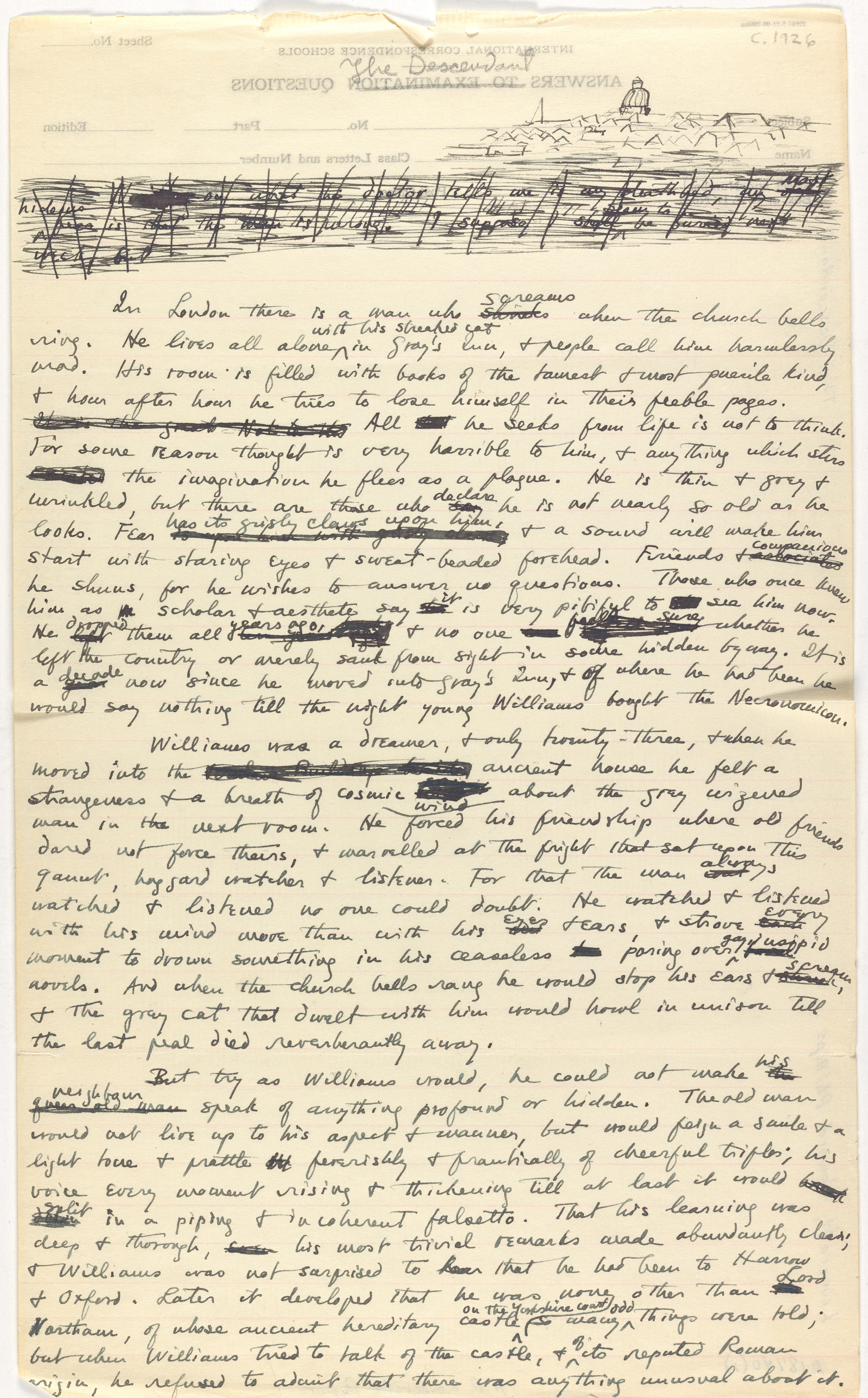
The Descendant

== Plot ==
The story begins with a description of a quiet and slightly mad older man who lives in the Gray's Inn with his pet cat. The man is haggard and haunted, looking older than his years and terrified of church bells. A young man named Williams (the narrator) moves into the Inn and tries to befriend the old man and get him to share his knowledge. It is revealed that the man is Lord Northam of England. Williams' attempts are largely rebuffed until one day, Williams acquires a copy of the Necronomicon, the book of the dead that captures the minds of so many intrigued by the dark arts. When Williams asks Northam to help translate the book's old Latin, Northam is horrified and begs Williams to burn the volume. Northam is forced to reveal his own history. His line goes back to Roman times in England when soldiers first took to the land. However, they encountered a cave-dwelling cult that they couldn't vanquish, despite their best efforts. This cult was said to be of a people who had lived there for a long time before and were from an ancient land which had sunk into the sea. This was the place where Northam's family castle was built. Generations later, Lord Northam still felt the haunting power of the place which led him to pursue the tales of the supernatural and even to witness them himself. This led him eventually to the Nameless City of Arabia and to believe that there are points in the world where one can transcend to some other place not of this universe. The story fragment ends without describing Williams reaction or Northam's final fate.

== Inspiration ==
Lovecraft may have been referring to this attempt at a story when he wrote that he was "making a very careful study of London...in order to get background for tales involving richer antiquities than America can furnish."
