= Jim Turner (editor) =

American book editor and publisher

James Allen Turner
- Born: March 19, 1945 St. Louis, Missouri, United States
- Died: March 28, 1999 (aged 54) St. Louis, Missouri, United States
- Occupation: editor, publisher

James Allen Turner (March 19, 1945 – March 28, 1999) was an American editor and publisher. Turner was editor for Arkham House after the death of August Derleth. After leaving Arkham House, he founded Golden Gryphon Press.

== Biography ==
James Allen Turner was born on March 19, 1945, in St. Louis, Missouri. He graduated from Collinsville High School in 1963. He received a B.A. from Washington University in St. Louis and began graduate school but became the editor at Arkham House in 1973 before he received his degree. As well as overseeing editorial operations at Arkham House generally, Turner himself edited an anthology of Lovecraftian horror for them - Cthulhu 2000: A Lovecraftian Anthology (1995; reprinted by Del Rey Books).

In 1996 he left Arkham House over creative differences with Arkham co-owner April Derleth. He immediately started his own company, Golden Gryphon Press, and continued to publish similar books as he had at Arkham House. Here he edited a second Lovecraftian anthology, Eternal Lovecraft: the Persistence of HPL in Popular Culture (Golden Gryphon Press, 1998).

Turner won the 1999 World Fantasy Award for his work with Golden Gryphon Press.
