= The Arkham Sampler =

American fantasy and horror fiction magazine

Cover of Winter 1949 issue of The Arkham Sampler

The Arkham Sampler was an American fantasy and horror fiction magazine first published in Winter 1948. The headquarters was in Sauk City, Wisconsin. The magazine, edited by August Derleth, was the first of two magazines published by Arkham House. It was published on a quarterly basis. The cover design was prepared by Ronald Clyne and was printed in alternating colors for the eight quarterly issues. Each issue had a print run of 1,200 copies with the exception of the Winter 1949 "All Science-Fiction Issue", of which 2,000 copies were printed. The Autumn 1949 issue was the last edition of the magazine.

The Arkham Sampler published fiction, poetry, reviews, letters, articles and bibliographic data. The magazine published original works by H. P. Lovecraft, Robert Bloch, Ray Bradbury, Robert E. Howard, Theodore Sturgeon, A. E. van Vogt and others. Other writers featured in the magazine include Anthony Boucher, Everett F. Bleiler, Martin Gardner, Carl Jacobi, David H. Keller, Fritz Leiber, Frank Belknap Long, E. Hoffmann Price, Vincent Starrett, Jules Verne and H. Russell Wakefield.

== See also ==
- Science fiction magazine
- Fantasy fiction magazine
- Horror fiction magazine

== Sources ==
- Jaffery, Sheldon (1989). The Arkham House Companion. Mercer Island, WA: Starmont House, Inc. pp. 29–30, 35–36. ISBN 1-55742-005-X.
- Chalker, Jack L.; Mark Owings (1998). The Science-Fantasy Publishers: A Bibliographic History, 1923-1998. Westminster, MD and Baltimore: Mirage Press, Ltd. pp. 32–34.
- Joshi, S.T. (1999). Sixty Years of Arkham House: A History and Bibliography. Sauk City, WI: Arkham House. pp. 44–47, 51–53. ISBN 0-87054-176-5.
- Nielsen, Leon (2004). Arkham House Books: A Collector's Guide. Jefferson, NC and London: McFarland & Company, Inc. pp. 64–67, 69–71. ISBN 0-7864-1785-4.
