= The Beast in the Cave =

1905 short story by H. P. Lovecraft

- Short story by H. P. Lovecraft
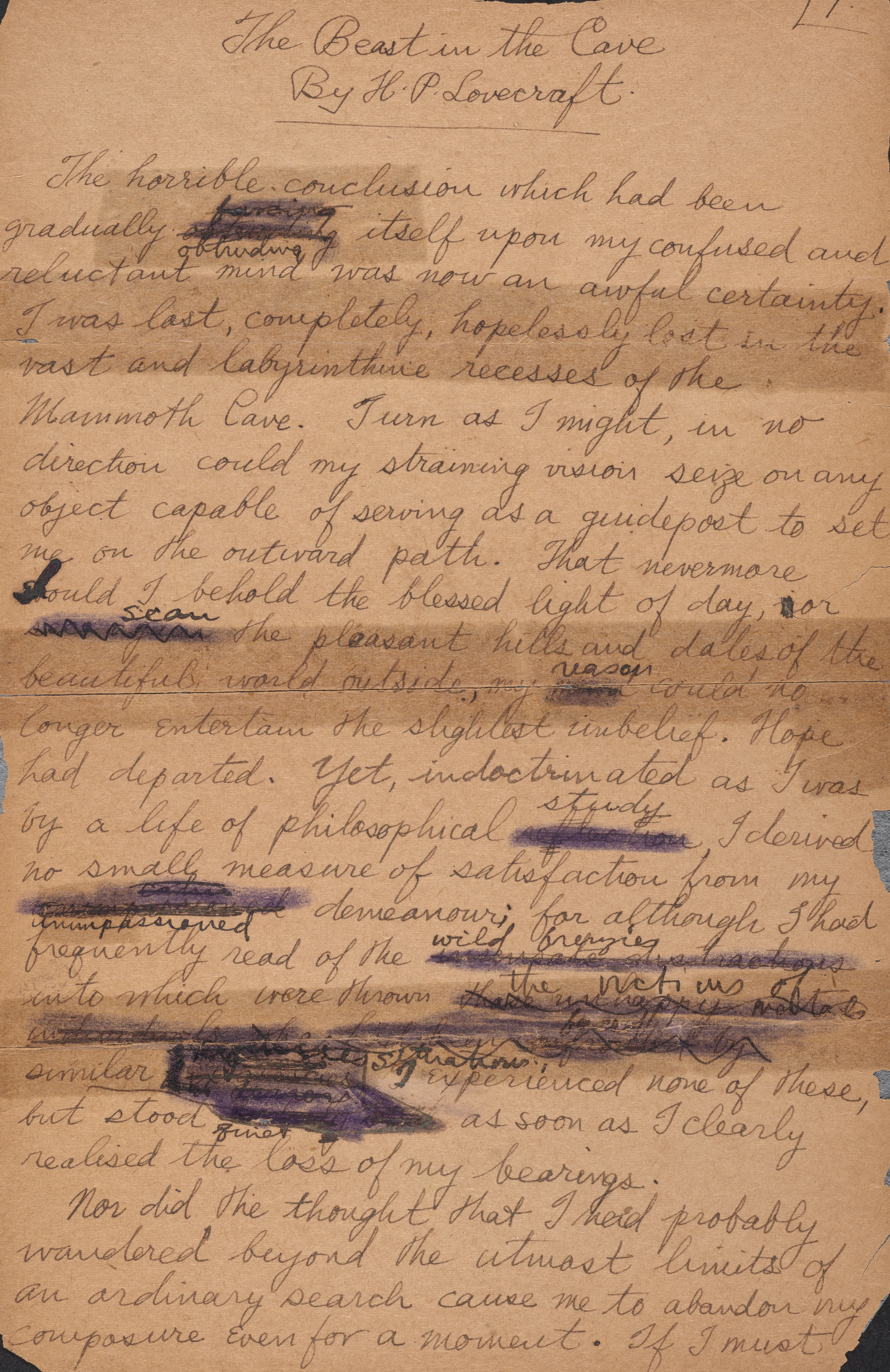
- First page of H. P. Lovecraft's original manuscript to "The Beast in the Cave"

Text available at Wikisource
- Country: United States
- Language: English
- Genre: Horror short story

Publication
- Published in: The Vagrant
- Publication date: June 1918

"The Beast in the Cave" is a short story by American horror fiction writer H. P. Lovecraft. The first draft was written in the Spring of 1904, with the final draft finished in April 1905, when Lovecraft was age fourteen. It was first published in the June 1918 issue of the amateur journalism publication The Vagrant, this being the equivalent of a well-edited fanzine today. The tale is to be regarded as an example of Lovecraft's juvenilia, and is classed as such in collections of his works.

In the 1930s Lovecraft sometimes sent a copy of the typescript to his promising young correspondents, as an example of what he had produced at their age, and also as a first exercise in re-writing. In this way, he could best judge how much imagination and promise they really had.

== Plot ==
A man touring the vast Mammoth Cave becomes separated from his guide and becomes lost. His torch expires and he is giving up hope of finding a way out in the pitch dark when he hears strange non-human footsteps approaching him. Thinking it to be a lost mountain lion or another such beast, he picks up some stones and throws them toward the source of the sound. The beast is hit and crumples to the floor. The guide finds the protagonist, and together they examine the fallen creature with the guide's torchlight. The creature mutters in its last breaths and they see its face. They discover a pale, deformed human, who had also become lost in the cave many years earlier.
