= Sheldon Jaffery =

American bibliographer and attorney (1934–2003)

- Born: Sheldon Ronald Jaffery; April 10, 1934; Cleveland, Ohio
- Died: July 10, 2003 (aged 69); Beachwood, Ohio
- Occupations: Attorney, bibliographer
- Awards: Horror Writers Association Silver Hammer Award, 1998

Sheldon Jaffery (April 22, 1934 – July 10, 2003) was an American bibliographer. An attorney by profession, he was an aficionado of Weird Tales magazine, Arkham House books, the weird menace pulps, and related topics.

== Biography ==
Jaffery was born April 22, 1934 in Cleveland, Ohio.

He earned a B.A. in English from Ohio State University in 1957 and a B.S. in education at Kent State University in 1959, then taught at Cardinal High School in Middlefield, Ohio for two years. He earned his law degree from Western Reserve University Law School in Cleveland in 1964, and practiced law in Cleveland for the remainder of his career.

Jaffery was also a private book dealer until 1987 with a particular interest in horror, science fiction and pulp. His bibliography work was a natural outgrowth of this. He published several volumes during his lifetime, including bibliographies of the publishers Arkham House, DAW Books, and the magazine Weird Tales. He also published several pulp fiction anthologies.

In 1998, the Horror Writers Association honored him with its Silver Hammer Award for his volunteer services to the organization.

Jaffery was married and had three children. He died in Beachwood, Ohio, on June 23, 2003 of septic shock contracted while being treated for lung cancer. His archives are held at Bowling Green State University in Ohio.

== Works ==
- Double Trouble: A Bibliographic Chronicle of Ace Mystery Doubles, Starmont Popular Culture Series no. 11, Borgo Press, 1987. ISBN 1-55742-118-8.
- Collector's Index to Weird Tales (with Fred Cook). Bowling Green State University Popular Press, August 1985. ISBN 0-87972-284-3.
- Future and Fantastic Worlds: Bibliography of DAW Books, Starmont Reference Guide, No. 4, 1987. ISBN 1-55742-003-3.
- Horrors and Unpleasantries: A Bibliographical History & Collector's Price Guide to Arkham House, Bowling Green State University Popular Press, 1982. ISBN 0-87972-220-7.
- Selected Tales of Grim and Grue from the Horror Pulps, Bowling Green State University Popular Press, 1987. ISBN 0-87972-392-0.
- Sensuous Science Fiction From the Weird and Spicy Pulps, Bowling Green State University Popular Press, 1984. ISBN 0-87972-306-8.
- The Weirds, Starmont House Inc., 1987. ISBN 0-930261-92-5.
- Hugh Cave's The Corpse Maker (anthology of stories by Hugh B. Cave) Starmont House, 1988.
- The Arkham House Companion: Fifty Years of Arkham House, Starmont House Inc., 1989. ISBN 1-55742-004-1. (A revised, updated and expanded edition of Horrors and Unpleasantries).

=== Unpublished work ===
- Double Futures: An Annotated Bibliography of the Ace Science Fiction Doubles. Planned for release by Borgo Press in 1999 (assigned ISBN 1-55742-139-0), but never issued.
