= The Original Text Solar Pons Omnibus Edition =

2000 collection of detective fiction stories by August Derleth

- Dust-jacket illustration by Jean-Pierre Cagnat for The Original Text Solar Pons Omnibus Edition Volume 1
- Author: August Derleth
- Illustrator: Frank Utpatel
- Cover artist: Jean-Pierre Cagnat
- Language: English
- Series: Solar Pons
- Genre: Detective, Science fiction short stories
- Publisher: Mycroft & Moran
- Publication date: 2000
- Publication place: Canada
- Media type: Print (Hardback)
- Pages: Volume 1: xx, 384 pp; Volume 2: viii, 826 pp (2 volumes are consecutively paginated)
- ISBN: 1-55246-070-3 (v. 1), ISBN 1-55246-072-X (v. 2), ISBN 1-55246-074-6 (set)
- OCLC: 38430841

The Original Text Solar Pons Omnibus Edition is a collection of detective fiction stories by author August Derleth. It was released in 2000 by Mycroft & Moran (under license to George Vanderburgh of Battered Silicon Dispatch Box, Canada) and was published in two volumes. The set collects all of the Solar Pons stories of August Derleth. The stories are pastiches of the Sherlock Holmes tales of Arthur Conan Doyle. The collection restores the text to its original state, removing the edits made by Basil Copper for the 1982 collection The Solar Pons Omnibus. The stories are also ordered by their date of publication rather than by their internal chronology as was done for the earlier omnibus edition. This edition also drops the Robert Bloch Foreword from the 1982 edition and adds two new introductory essays by Peter Ruber.

The publisher announced a paperback reissue of this set in eight volumes, but as 2025, these volumes have not appeared.

== Contents ==
The Original Text Solar Pons Omnibus Edition contains the following tales:

=== Volume One ===
- "Introducing Solar Pons of Praed Street" by Peter Ruber
- "Of Basil Copper, James Turner, and the Solar Pons Fiasco of 1982" by Peter Ruber
- "In Re: Sherlock Holmes" -- The Adventures of Solar Pons [1945]
  - "In Re: Solar Pons" by Vincent Starrett
1. "A Word From Dr. Lyndon Parker"
2. "The Adventure of the Frightened Baronet"
3. "The Adventure of the Late Mr. Faversham"
4. "The Adventure of the Black Narcissus"
5. "The Adventure of the Norcross Riddle"
6. "The Adventure of the Retired Novelist"
7. "The Adventure of the Three Red Dwarfs"
8. "The Adventure of the Sotheby Salesman"
9. "The Adventure of the Purloined Periapt"
10. "The Adventure of the Limping Man"
11. "The Adventure of the Seven Passengers"
12. "The Adventure of the Lost Holiday"
13. "The Adventure of the Man With a Broken Face"
- The Memoirs of Solar Pons [1951]
  - "Foreword" by Luther Norris
  - "Introduction" by Ellery Queen
1. "The Adventure of the Circular Room"
2. "The Adventure of the Perfect Husband"
3. "The Adventure of the Broken Chessman"
4. "The Adventure of the Dog in the Manger"
5. "The Adventure of the Proper Comma"
6. "The Adventure of Ricoletti of the Club Foot"
7. "The Adventure of the Six Silver Spiders"
8. "The Adventure of the Lost Locomotive"
9. "The Adventure of the Tottenham Werewolf"
10. "The Adventure of the Five Royal Coachmen"
11. "The Adventure of the Paralytic Mendicant"
- The Return of Solar Pons [1958]
  - "Introduction" by Edgar W. Smith
1. "The Adventure of the Lost Dutchman"
2. "The Adventure of the Devil's Footprints"
3. "The Adventure of the Dorrington Inheritance"
4. "The Adventure of the 'Triple Kent'"
5. "The Adventure of the Rydberg Numbers"
6. "The Adventure of the Grice-Paterson Curse"
7. "The Adventure of the Stone of Scone"
8. "The Adventure of the Remarkable Worm"
9. "The Adventure of the Penny Magenta"
10. "The Adventure of the Trained Cormorant"
11. "The Adventure of the Camberwell Beauty"
12. "The Adventure of the Little Hangman"
13. "The Adventure of the Swedenborg Signatures"
- The Reminiscences of Solar Pons [1961]
  - "Introduction by Anthony Boucher
1. "The Adventure of the Mazarine Blue"
2. "The Adventure of the Hats of M. Dulac"
3. "The Adventure of the Mosaic Cylinders"
4. "The Adventure of the Praed Street Irregulars"
5. "The Adventure of the Cloverdale Kennels"
6. "The Adventure of the Black Cardinal"
7. "The Adventure of the Troubled Magistrate"
8. "The Adventure of the Blind Clairaudient"
- Abbreviations for the Solar Pons Canon

=== Volume Two ===
- The Casebook of Solar Pons [1965]
  - "Foreword" by Vincent Starrett
1. "The Adventure of the Sussex Archers"
2. "The Adventure of the Haunted Library"
3. "The Adventure of the Fatal Glance"
4. "The Adventure of the Intarsia Box"
5. "The Adventure of the Spurious Tamerlaine"
6. "The Adventure of the China Cottage"
7. "The Adventure of the Ascot Scandal"
8. "The Adventure of the Crouching Dog"
9. "The Adventure of the Missing Huntsman"
10. "The Adventure of the Amateur Philologist"
11. "The Adventure of the Whispering Knights"
12. "The Adventure of the Innkeeper's Clerk"
- "Afterword"
1. Mr. Fairlie's Final Journey [1968]
  1. "The Last of Jonas Fairlie"
  2. "Farway Hall"
  3. "The Poor Cousins"
  4. "Mr. Abercrombie's Reticence"
  5. "An Attempt at Murder"
  6. "Inquest"
  7. "A Visit to Cheltenham"
  8. "Jonas Fairlie's Retreat"
  9. "The Second Secret"
- The Chronicles of Solar Pons [1973]
  - "Introduction" by Allen J. Hubin
1. "The Adventure of the Red Leech"
2. "The Adventure of the Orient Express"
3. "The Adventure of the Golden Bracelet"
4. "The Adventure of the Shaplow Millions"
5. "The Adventure of the Benin Bronze"
6. "The Adventure of the Missing Tenants"
7. "The Adventure of the Aluminum Crutch"
8. "The Adventure of the Seven Sisters"
9. "The Adventure of the Bishop's Companion"
10. "The Adventure of the Unique Dickensians"
- A Praed Street Dossier [1968]
1. "The Beginnings of Solar Pons"
2. "The Sources of the Tales"
3. "Concerning Dr. Parker's Background"
4. "The Favorite Pastiches"
5. "From the Notebooks of Dr. Lyndon Parker"
6. "The Adventure of the Bookseller's Clerk"
7. "Solar Pons, Off-Trail"
8. "The Adventure of the Snitch in Time" (with Mack Reynolds)
9. "The Adventure of the Ball of Nostradamus" (with Mack Reynolds)
- The Final Adventures of Solar Pons [1998]
1. Terror Over London
  1. "If You See a Hunchback"
  2. "At the Foreign Office"
  3. "Pons Explains"
  4. "The Lady Ysola Warrender"
  5. "The King of Clubs"
  6. "Lord Norton is Indiscreet"
  7. "Mr. Howells Appears and Disappears"
  8. "The Lady in Black"
  9. "The Green Light"
  10. "Mr. Howells Once More"
  11. "Number 21, Limehouse Causeway"
  12. "The Enemy Strikes"
  13. "Mr. John Devore"
  14. "The Horror in the Fog"
  15. "The Halting Footsteps"
  16. "The Dead Man Comes to Life"
  17. "Alvert, the Dove"
  18. "Frick is Heard From"
  19. "The End in Sight"
  20. "The Last of the Clubs"
2. The Lost Adventures
  1. "The Adventures of Gresham Old Place"
  2. "The Adventure of the Burlstone Horror"
  3. "The Adventure of the Viennese Musician"
  4. "The Adventure of the Muttering Man"
3. The Off-Trail Solar Pons
  1. "The Adventure of the Nosferatu" (with Mack Reynolds)
  2. "The Adventure of the Extra-Terrestrial" (with Mack Reynolds)
- Praed Street Papers
  - Cartoons by Frank Utpatel
1. "The Adventure of the Limping Man"
2. "The Adventure of the Missing Tenants"
- Abbreviations for the Solar Pons Canon
