= Carnacki =

Fictional detective by William Hope Hodgson

Thomas Carnacki
- A portrait by Florence Briscoe from the title logo that accompanied the first five Carnacki stories in The Idler, 1910.
- First appearance: The Gateway of the Monster (1910)
- Created by: William Hope Hodgson
- Portrayed by: Alan Napier; Donald Pleasence; Dan Starkey

In-universe information
- Gender: Male
- Occupation: Occult detective
- Nationality: English

Thomas Carnacki is a fictional occult detective created by English fantasy writer William Hope Hodgson. Carnacki was the protagonist of a series of six short stories published between 1910 and 1912 in The Idler magazine and The New Magazine.

These stories were printed together as Carnacki, the Ghost-Finder in 1913. A 1947 Mycroft & Moran (an imprint of Arkham House) edition of Carnacki, the Ghost-Finder edited by August Derleth added three stories: "The Haunted Jarvee", published posthumously in The Premier Magazine in 1929; "The Hog", published in Weird Tales in 1947; and "The Find", a previously unpublished story.

== Notes on the series ==
The stories are inspired by the tradition of fictional detectives such as Sherlock Holmes. Carnacki lives in a bachelor flat in No 427 Cheyne Walk, Chelsea; the stories are told from a first-person perspective by Dodgson, a member of Carnacki's "strictly limited circle of friends", much as Holmes' adventures were told from Doctor Watson's point of view (his other friends are Jessop, Arkwright and Taylor). Whereas the Holmes stories never made use of the supernatural except as a red herring, this is the central theme of the Carnacki stories, though several of the stories have non-supernatural endings.

The character of Carnacki was inspired in part by Dr. Hesselius, a supernaturally inclined scientist who appeared in short stories by the Irish fantasy writer Sheridan Le Fanu, notably the early and influential vampire story "Carmilla". Carnacki is also highly reminiscent of Algernon Blackwood's John Silence.

=== General structure ===
The stories are presented using a framework: Carnacki periodically invites four friends to dinner, to be followed by a description of his latest case. One of the guests, Dodgson, is the actual narrator of the stories, though the audience comprises an extremely minimal part of the narrative. Carnacki forbids discussion of the case in question until dinner is over; the group move to the parlor, everyone settles into a favourite chair, Carnacki lights his pipe, and the adventure proceeds without interruption.

Each of Carnacki's tales relates an investigation into an unusual haunting, which Carnacki is charged to identify and to end. He employs a variety of scientific methods in his work, including up-to-date technologies such as photography and his own fictional invention, the Electric Pentacle; he also has a wide knowledge of folklore and the occult. Never presumptuous, Carnacki is careful to gather solid evidence before drawing a conclusion regarding the authenticity of a haunting; unlike many other occult detectives, several of his cases turn out to be only human fakery. This variety helps endow the stories with suspense, as the audience cannot be sure whether the ghosts are real or not: of the nine Carnacki stories, one contains no supernatural elements, four feature authentic paranormal activity, two have the appearance of the supernatural as a disguise for mundane human activity, and two contain manmade hoaxes in parallel with an actual haunting.

After the tale is complete, Carnacki usually answers a few questions from his guests and may hand around a relevant memento, but does not discuss the case at great length. He then dismisses his guests with the genial phrase "Out you go!"

=== Inventions ===
In addition to the trademark electric pentacle, Hodgson invented several rituals and ancient texts that feature in the Carnacki stories.

Carnacki uses a fictional ancient text, the "Sigsand Manuscript", as a resource to protect himself against supernatural influences. Carnacki refers to "Aeiirii" and "Saiitii" manifestations, the latter being more dangerous and capable of overcoming Carnacki's protective devices, and several rituals, including the "Saaamaaa Ritual", with its mysterious "eight signs" and "unknown last line" that is invoked in "The Whistling Room" by a mysterious power.

There are references to even more arcane fictional works, including the "Incantation of Raaaee", but no further information is provided in the stories.

=== Influence ===
The stories influenced later horror and fantasy writers, notably Seabury Quinn, who had his own supernatural detective character (Jules de Grandin). Simon R. Green pays homage to Hodgson with his Ghost Finders series, where the protagonists work for the mysterious Carnacki Institute. Judas Ghost, a film based on Green's series, was released November 2013.

=== Critical opinion ===
Unlike some of Hodgson's work, the Carnacki stories remain very accessible to a modern audience. A. F. Kidd and Rick Kennett in their introduction to No. 472 Cheyne Walk: Carnacki, the Untold Stories pose the question: "What is it about Thomas Carnacki that fascinates so many people?" According to Kidd and Kennett, the series' enduring attraction comes more from Hodgson's capacity for world-building than any special appeal of Carnacki himself:

It certainly isn't his dynamic personality. Not much character is evident in Hodgson's creation: he is your generic stiff upper-lip Edwardian Englishman ... but the exotic landscapes he inhabits are supernatural... it's his exploits, and the carefully constructed milieu in which they take place, that continue to intrigue. They are quite timeless.

Although a self-proclaimed fan of Hodgson's work, H. P. Lovecraft considered Carnacki, the Ghost-Finder "vastly inferior" to his earlier novels, calling it "his poorest work" and Carnacki himself "very weak, artificial and stereotyped", "surely only a mediocre echo of John Silence".

In an article about supernatural fiction, William Rose Benét stated "I remember delighting in the stories in Carnacki, the Ghost Finder, recommended to me by Elinor Wylie, though I see that Howard P. Lovecraft rates this book below Hodgson's others."

Ellery Queen praised the character as a "ghost-breaker after Houdini's own heart", and listed the 1947 edition of Carnacki as No. 53 in the Queen's Quorum of key detective works.

China Miéville lauded the Carnacki stories as "vigorous Edwardian psychic-detectiviana".

== Summaries of Hodgson's Carnacki stories ==
The first six stories are covered here in sequence of their original publication, five in 1910 monthly issues of The Idler and "The Thing Invisible" in The New Magazine, January 1912. "The Thing Invisible" is first as the stories were collected in 1913, and again as collected in 1947. Most if not all collections follow that sequence, prior to Project Gutenberg Ebook #10832 (2004), which contains the first six stories alone, in their magazine sequence.

"The Thing Invisible" was revised, and expanded by about half, presumably for the 1913 or 1947 collection. The collection as presented by Forgotten Futures contains both versions of "The Thing Invisible" and publishing history notes that identify some minor differences in the other stories.

=== "The Gateway of the Monster" ===
In an ancient mansion, the bedroom known as the Grey Room was the site of a grisly murder generations ago. Carnacki is summoned to investigate a noisy spirit that tears off the bedclothes and slams the door(s). The manifestation is far more powerful than he expects, and he spends a miserable, terrified night in his electric pentacle while a horrible apparition in the form of a giant human hand pounds at his defences. The next day, Carnacki finds the fabled "luck ring", and he brings it with him into the pentacle. This proves unwise, as when night falls the vicious entity pours from the ring itself and Carnacki is inside the pentacle with it. He barely escapes with his life, while the entity is trapped. He ends the haunting by melting down the ring into a lump of slag within his protective barrier.

=== "The House Among the Laurels" ===
A deserted mansion in Ireland displays signs of haunting, including what appears to be blood dripping from the ceiling, and several men have been found dead in the house. Is it a prank or a haunting? Carnacki recruits a group of burly local men to investigate, along with several dogs, and they attempt to stay the night within the mansion. During their ordeal doors slam, the fire goes out, a dog is killed, and the entire group bolts from the house in terror. Upon studying his photograph, Carnacki realises that he and the men have been played for fools. His photograph shows a wire, too fine to see in the dark, lowered from the ceiling to remove the hook holding the door open. The "blood drip" is coloured water, and the "ghosts" are actually a criminal gang living in secret rooms in the mansion and playing a trick on him, taking advantage of the local legends to frighten away interlopers.

=== "The Whistling Room" ===
When a chamber in a mansion manifests a loud, eerie whistling, Carnacki is called to investigate. He makes an exceedingly thorough search of the room, but can find no explanation. He is still not convinced of the supernatural nature of the sound until he climbs a ladder outside and peers into the room through the window: the floor of the room itself is puckering like a pair of grotesque, blistered lips. He hears Tassoc, the mansion's owner, calling for help, and enters the room via the window. But Tassoc is not in the room—only an extraordinarily dangerous supernatural entity. Carnacki is saved only by the intervention of an unknown, second being, which utters the unknown last line of the Saamaa ritual, temporarily rendering the whistling entity powerless. With that, Carnacki throws himself through the window to escape. He then has the room demolished, and all parts burned in a blast furnace within a protective pentacle including an ancient inscription in Celtic. According to legend, a court jester was once killed in the room's fireplace, and whistled as he was roasted to death.

=== "The Horse of the Invisible" ===
According to Hisgins family tradition, any first-born female will be haunted by a ghostly horse during her courtship. This story has been long considered a legend, but now for the first time in seven generations there is a first-born female, and her fiancée has just suffered a broken arm after an attack by a mysterious assailant. Carnacki is summoned to investigate. He and the woman, Mary, and her fiancée, Beaumont, hear hoofbeats in the night, but no horse is seen. Many people present hear the hoofbeats, but no one can find an explanation; Carnacki sets up the electric pentacle around Mary's bed. The hoofbeats are heard again during the night, but nothing else happens. No marks of hooves can be found around the grounds the next morning. The following evening, hoofbeats and neighing are heard on the grounds, and Mary is heard screaming. Carnacki rushes out with his camera, and snaps a picture, but sees nothing after the blinding flash. Beaumont is struck in the head, but not badly injured; he claims that he has seen an enormous horse's head. The hoofbeats are again heard during the night. The decision is made to accelerate the wedding plans, in the hopes that the haunting will disappear with the successful conclusion of the courtship.

The next day, Carnacki takes Mary around the house, snapping photographs to see if any manifestation can be seen on film. In the cellar a horrible neighing is heard, but nothing is seen. In one of the developed photographs, however, an enormous hoof can be seen. The night again passes uneventfully. The next morning, though, hoofbeats and neighing can be heard almost immediately, in what seems a direct assault by the invisible horse; Carnacki fires his weapon and Mary's father attacks with his sword. As a light is brought they discover a rejected suitor, Parsket, wearing an enormous costume horse head and hooves. As they interrogate Parsket, hoofbeats are again heard in the house, and this time it is not a trick; Parsket dies of fright. The marriage goes on as planned, and the manifestation is never heard again.

=== "The Searcher of the End House" ===
Carnacki discovers "a queer, soft, flabby, spreading imprint, that gave me a feeling of extraordinary horror"

Carnacki investigates a haunting in his own mother's house. The first indication that something is amiss comes when Carnacki, up late reading, hears his mother knocking, so he thinks, on the banister to tell him to go to his bed. She does not remember doing so the next day, and it happens again the following night. When Carnacki looks in on her, he finds her door open, but she is sound asleep. A strange mildew smell is in the bedroom. Carnacki investigates the house, including the three cellars, but can find no explanation.

The opening of the door happens again the following night, and this time while Carnacki is speaking to his mother the two of them hear a door slam twice downstairs. The smell of mildew is powerful as Carnacki investigates the house. More doors are heard slamming in the night, but Carnacki can find nothing. The next day, he consults the landlord, and learns something of the house's mysterious history, which includes a former tenant named Captain Tobias, and rumours of a ghostly woman. Several previous tenants had left upon seeing this apparition. The landlord agrees to spend the night in the house as well. In the dead of night, they see a ghostly, naked child running through the house. They have little doubt that it is a supernatural manifestation. The landlord claims to see a woman, apparently searching for the child, although Carnacki cannot see it. All of the seals on the doors are unbroken. As they debate what they have seen, the mildew smell returns, more powerful than ever. The downstairs passages are wet with grotesquely shaped footprints. In his nervousness, the landlord accidentally fires his revolver. No one is hit, but the police arrive to investigate. The physical evidence convinces the officer that an investigation is in order. As they wind up their tour, a second officer sees the ghostly woman. The men follow the wet footprints and smell into the cellars; on the top step, they find a wriggling maggot. Through their investigation of the third cellar, they find that the prints stop at a disused well, filled with water. They watch the well for the rest of the night, but nothing more happens.

The next evening, the men reconvene in the basement with lamps, a tripwire, and a wire cage to suspend over the well. Carnacki locks and seals the doors. As they keep watch, the ghostly child again manifests, apparently fleeing from an unseen pursuer. All present but Carnacki claim to see a woman, although he does see all the metal objects in the basement shining strangely. While they watch, something is heard to emerge from the well, giving off the horrible smell; Carnacki lowers the cage, and when the men uncover the lanterns they discover that they have caught Captain Tobias, carrying a leg of spoiled mutton. He came in through a secret passage at the bottom of the well. We learn that Captain Tobias is wanted for smuggling, after being released from prison only a few weeks earlier. He is trying to drive out the tenants of his old home so that he can retrieve smuggled goods; the sounds were produced when he entered a hidden passage in Carnacki's mother's bedroom. The wooden panels have warped with age, and so make a clicking sound.

As for the ghost, Captain Tobias also reports that he has seen the woman and child. Carnacki believes that "...the Woman and the Child were not only two complete and different entities; but even they were each not in quite the same planes of existence". He thinks the men may have witnessed the ghost of a wayward unborn child that refused to accept birth into the natural world and which was thus pulled back by what Sigsand called "thee Haggs". Carnacki goes on to say "it leaves us with the conception of a child's soul adrift half-way between two lives, and running through Eternity from Something incredible and inconceivable (because not understood) to our senses".

=== "The Thing Invisible" ===
A chapel attached to an Edwardian manor house contains an ancient, cursed dagger that has just apparently almost murdered someone of its own accord, and naturally, Carnacki is called in to investigate. He spends the night in the chapel wearing armour with his camera ready to photograph any mysterious phenomena. All night he hears mysterious noises. As he approaches the altar, the dagger nearly kills him. The photographic evidence settles it, though—there is a rational explanation. The somewhat demented elderly gentleman of the manor house has armed an ancient trap that guards the altar: a spring mechanism designed to fling the dagger when the altar gate is opened. Carnacki uncovers the truth because of a subtle difference between the "before" and "after" photographs of the altar's cast iron metalwork.

=== "The Hog" ===
This story was first printed in Weird Tales (Jan 1947). Carnacki faces perhaps his most powerful adversary: a disturbing hog spirit of giant proportions which is trying to enter our world, manifesting as a series of horrifying nightmares. He is equipped with a new variant on the electric pentacle involving rainbow-coloured tubes. When connected to the head of the dreamer these tubes fluctuate in color and light intensity. Carnacki photographs the tubes on a slowly moving strip of paper which he specially develops to create raised images. When the paper is run under the reproducer of a specially modified phonograph the sounds heard by the dreamer are reproduced- in this instance the sounds of evil swine.

=== "The Haunted Jarvee" ===
Carnacki decides to go for a voyage aboard the Jarvee, his old friend Captain Thompson's antique sailing ship, for purposes of rejuvenation, but also to investigate the ambiguous complaints of ghosts his friend had been making for some time. Carnacki performs his standard methods of exhaustively and completely searching the designated area to eliminate obvious physical causes of a haunting. Finding nothing, Carnacki is left to wait. After four days, whilst performing his usual patrol along the ship's poop deck with the Captain, his old friend suddenly points out to him a shadow of some sort on the ocean's surface, speeding towards the ship. He notices similar shadows converging on the ship from all of the cardinal directions. The closer they get to the Jarvee, the harder it is to see them, and eventually they disappear from sight. Carnacki, the Captain and the rest of the crew retire, and the night goes normally, until about eleven o'clock, when a furious storm bursts upon the ship without a hint of warning. Refusing to send men up above to lower the sails and masts because of previous experiences in which he did just that, and his men were hurled to their death, Captain Thompson forces them to sit out the storm completely unprepared, and the Jarvee suffers tremendous damage. Observing all this, Carnacki guesses that the phenomenon is caused by vibrations, so when he observes the shadows converging on the ship again the next day, he sets up a device to emit repellent vibrations. The ship is then struck by a furious squall, which tears one of the sails right off of the ropes. It is not until 2 A.M that the squall passes, followed by an entire week of calm seas, with a furious wind storm every night.

During this week of calm, however, Carnacki is left to experiment with his repellent vibrations, until finally, he is given the distinct impression that his experiments are producing results, and he finally convinces Captain Thompson to allow him to set up his machine to emit the vibrations at full power, without stopping, starting at sunset. Afraid for their lives, Carnacki orders the crew to stay below decks, padlocking the doors and making the first and eighth signs of the Saaamaaa Ritual, connected with triple lines crossed at every seventh inch. The Captain and the three mates demand to accompany him during the night, and Carnacki reluctantly agrees. He draws a pentacle with chalk around the machine emitting the vibrations, and around the Captain and his mates. He then erects the Electric Pentacle and turns the vibration machine on. Soon after, he and the Captain witness the mysterious shadows racing towards the ship. Strange, purple lightning is then witnessed, but it is not accompanied by thunder. Soon after, the ship undergoes a series of strange "shudderings" before it starts to tip onto its side, sending the Electric Pentacle sliding, and forcing Carnacki, Captain Thompson and his three mates to hold on for dear life. Carnacki is forced to shut his machine off.

Predictably, there is a booming of thunder, and a furious storm starts raging. Towards morning, the storm calms, and soon after, the Jarvee is running before a strong wind—but a leak has been sprung, and two days after, they are forced to abandon ship and take to the boats.

The Jarvee sinks to the bottom of the ocean.

After he finishes his tale, Dodgson, the narrator asks what caused the haunting. Carnacki then explains his theory of "focuses", saying that the Jarvee, for whatever reason, be it the particular mood a builder was in as he hammered a nail home, or the tree that makes up a certain board, was a focal point for "attractive vibrations". He summarises by saying that it is impossible for him to know fully why the Jarvee was being haunted, and he could only make suppositions.

=== "The Find" ===
Carnacki investigates a seemingly impossible book forgery. It is the only Carnacki story without any hint of the supernatural.

== Adaptations ==
=== Television ===
"The Whistling Room" was presented by Pepsi-Cola Playhouse in 1954 (Season 1, Episode 42), starring Alan Napier and directed by Alex Gruenberg.

"The Horse of the Invisible" was adapted as an episode of the 1970s British TV series, The Rivals of Sherlock Holmes.

Cast

- Donald Pleasence as Carnacki
- Tony Steedman as Captain Hisgins
- Michele Dotrice as Mary Hisgins
- Michael Johnson as Charles Beaumont
- Geoffrey Whitehead as Harry Parsket
- Aimée Delamain as Miss Hisgins
- Arthur White as March

=== Audio ===
Big Finish Productions has recorded six of the stories in unabridged audiobook format. The stories adapted are:

- The Gateway of the Monster
- The House Among the Laurels
- The Whistling Room
- The Horse of the Invisible
- The Searcher of the End House
- The Thing Invisible

Cast

- Dan Starkey as Carnacki
- Joseph Kloska as Dodgson

== Carnacki stories by other authors ==
=== "Carnacki: Recorder of Things Strange" ===
A graphic novel adaptation and continuation of the story of Thomas Carnacki called "Carnacki: Recorder of Things Strange" is currently in the works, fully inspired by the original stories written by William Hope Hodgson. The adventures of Thomas Carnacki will be told in short story format steeped in weird fiction, folklore, ghost stories, mythology and symbolism. The graphic novel is written and illustrated by M. S. Corley.

=== 472 Cheyne Walk ===
The book No. 472 Cheyne Walk: Carnacki, the Untold Stories by A. F. Kidd and Rick Kennett collects twelve stories written about the further adventures of Carnacki. Four of these stories were originally published as a 32-page booklet of the same title in 1992. The book version was printed in a limited edition of 500 copies.

Many of these stories are inspired by off-hand references to other cases of hauntings that Carnacki makes in his stories, which were never explained further in the original story series. In their introduction to the 1992 booklet the authors describe these stories as pastiche, in the sense of respectful imitation or homage, as opposed to parody, which mocks the original (either with respectful humour, or more viciously). The authors suggest that Hodgson, by having Carnacki casually drop references to other cases which he himself did not write about, "invited" his readers to enter the "shared universe" and pick up where he left off. Readers may decide for themselves whether to consider these stories "canon" or a legitimate part of the Carnacki story arc; they closely follow not only the basic framework structure of the Carnacki original stories but also Hodgson's style and vocabulary.

==== "The Darkness" ====
In "The Gateway of the Monster" and "The Horse of the Invisible", Carnacki makes passing references to the "Black Veil case", in which a man named Aster died because he did not accept the necessity of staying inside the protective pentacle. In "The Darkness", Aster is a reporter who accompanies Carnacki on his investigation of a haunted room. An apparition of a mysterious woman can be seen in the window and a rotting black veil is found inside a secret compartment in a window-seat. Carnacki burns the veil inside a pentacle in the hopes of ending the haunting. However, as night falls, Aster will not enter the pentacle, believing this to be superstitious nonsense. Both men lose the power of sight as the apparition manifests, and Carnacki must listen helplessly from inside the pentacle as Aster is driven into screaming madness and death. No option remains to end the haunting but to destroy the house itself.

==== "Matheson's Inheritance" ====
In "The Gateway of the Monster" Carnacki makes reference to the "Noving Fur" case. It is unclear if this is a typographical error and Hodgson intended "Moving Fur" instead; the Collected Fiction edition and the Project Gutenberg electronic text show this correction. "Matheson's Inheritance" covers both bases by including moving fur and placing the haunting in Noving House in Wales.

Matheson has inherited a baroque mansion. Local legend says the house was once occupied by a dewi (wizard) and his familiar an afanc. One room in the house emanates dread. Carnacki and Matheson can find no natural explanation, and so Carnacki spends the night in the room, inside his protective pentacle. In the middle of his vigil his candle flames suddenly turn black, and the floor becomes a heaving carpet of fur, as if the pentacle was upon the back of a giant animal. It is clear that the protective barrier has failed utterly. As in "The Whistling Room", a second powerful entity intervenes and the candle flames turn blue; Carnacki is given a moment to escape the room, and does so, although his pantlegs are torn and his legs covered with cuts. In daylight, strange, ancient bones are found under the floorboards of the room; before the room can be demolished, that wing of the mansion burns.

The blue candle flames point Carnacki back to references to the protective powers of colours in the Sigsand manuscript, suggesting the origin of the coloured tubes that appear in Hodgson's Carnacki story "The Hog". The afanc is described as having a horse-like head; this description does not match the Welsh myth, and so may be a reference to "The Horse of the Invisible".

Motifs: a legend; a protective pentacle; a supernatural manifestation; protection from one supernatural entity by another, more powerful one; a creature or creatures unknown to science; a vigil.

=== "Doctor Who: Foreign Devils" ===
In 2002, an Andrew Cartmel novella appeared as one of a series based upon Doctor Who. Foreign Devils featured Carnacki alongside the Second Doctor as his companion.

=== Doctor Who: The Doctor and Carnacki ===
In 2024, Big Finish Productions announced a box set of three full-cast audio dramas featuring Dan Starkey reprising his role as Carnacki alongside Sylvester McCoy as the Seventh Doctor, who appears intermittently throughout Carnacki's life. The dramas are entitled "The Haunter of the Shore" by AK Benedict, "The House" by Georgia Cook, and "The Institute of Forgotten Souls" by Jonathan Barnes. Starkey has appeared prominently in Doctor Who in audio for Big Finish and on television, notably as Strax and other characters of the Sontaran race. The set was released in November of that year.

=== The League of Extraordinary Gentlemen ===
In 2007 a graphic novel entitled The League of Extraordinary Gentlemen: Black Dossier was released, written by Alan Moore and illustrated by Kevin O'Neill. It is part of The League of Extraordinary Gentlemen series, and is the first to feature Thomas Carnacki. Carnacki is a member of the 1910s League of Extraordinary Gentlemen, with Wilhelmina Murray, Allan Quatermain, Orlando, and A. J. Raffles. The Black Dossier is filled with non-comic pieces, taking the form of prose stories, letters, maps, guidebooks, magazines and even a lost Shakespeare folio. Carnacki features most prominently in a short story "What Ho, Gods of the Abyss" and concerns a visit by Jeeves and Bertie Wooster (by P. G. Wodehouse) to Wooster's Aunt Dahlia wherein they encounter an Elder Thing, along with a Mi-go and a Cthulhu cult. Carnacki is described as being "an older man...who seemed to be regarded by the others as an expert on the sort of business going on within my aunt's estate". After questioning Wooster closely he performs a ritual banishing of the Elder Thing with the help of his team. In another section of the Black Dossier entitled "The Sincerest Form of Flattery" it is mentioned that Carnacki "had encounters with some form of spirit that allowed him brief, fragmentary visions of the future" regarding an attempt to derail the coronation of King George V. Due to ill health following his visions of World War I, Carnacki did not participate in the League's battle with Les Hommes Mysterieux, and had by 1937 retired from active duty.

Released in 2009, Part I of The League of Extraordinary Gentlemen, Volume III: Century entitled "What Keeps Mankind Alive" features Carnacki as a main character. Set in 1910, following his visions of a black cabal, Carnacki brings Mina Harker, Allan Quatermain, Orlando, and A.J. Raffles to an occult club which is populated by a range of fictional occult detectives looking for clues as to the cabal. This leads them to investigate and confront the cabal led by W. Somerset Maugham's Aleister Crowley analogue, Oliver Haddo. Carnacki suspects that they are trying to end the world by creating a Moonchild.

=== Audience with the Ghost Finder ===
Audience with the Ghost Finder, a stage play by M. J. Starling, features Carnacki and Dodgson as main characters. Though the story is original, the play is an explicit homage to Hodgson's stories, several of which are directly referenced by the characters – most notably The Horse of the Invisible, the events of which form part of the backstory. The play also borrows imagery from H. P. Lovecraft's story The Dreams in the Witch-House.

Audience with the Ghost Finder was first performed by Blackshaw Theatre in May 2013, at the Wandsworth Arts Festival and Fringe. It was revived in October 2013 as part of the London Horror Festival.

=== The Diogenes Club ===
Kim Newman has written a number of short stories about the Diogenes Club, as originally from the Sherlock Holmes stories of Arthur Conan Doyle. In Newman's setting, the Club investigates paranormal and occult matters for British intelligence and police agencies. In the stories "The Man Who Got Off The Ghost Train" and "Swellhead", it is mentioned that Carnacki was a member of the Diogenes Club as a special occult investigator; when he retired, his position was taken by Newman's character Richard Jeperson. Carnacki is also mentioned as having investigated several cases alongside Sherlock Holmes.

=== Carnacki in the Cthulhu Mythos ===
Barbara Hambly's short story "The Adventure of the Antiquarian's Niece" (from Shadows Over Baker Street) and A. F. Kidd's short story "The Grantchester Grimoire" (from Gaslight Grimoire) both also feature Carnacki aiding Sherlock Holmes in an investigation of an occult matter.

=== "A Forgotten Caudetan Incident" ===
Spanish author Alberto López Aroca wrote the short story "Un olvidado episodio caudetano" ("A Forgotten Caudetan Incident"), included in the book Los Espectros Conjurados (ISBN 978-84-607-9866-8), featuring Carnacki in a Spanish village, Caudete; and by the same author, "Algunos derivados del alquitrán" ("Some Coal-tar Derivatives"), included in the volume Sherlock Holmes y lo Outré -Publisher: Academia de Mitología Creativa Jules Verne de Albacete, 2007-, with Carnacki visiting a retired Sherlock Holmes in Fulworth. Carnacki appears as an old man in another work by López Aroca, Necronomicón Z (Ediciones Dolmen, 2012; ISBN 978-84-15296-59-1), a Cthulhu Mythos novel.

=== Gravel ===
In 2008, the comic publisher Avatar started serialising Gravel, the ongoing adventures of Warren Ellis' and Mike Wolfer's combat magician William Gravel (previously told in the Strange Kisses, Stranger Kisses and the Strange Killings mini-series). In the first storyline of the ongoing Gravel comic, Ellis and Wolfer had the "Sigsand manuscript", split in parts for each of the "Minor Seven" (Britain's occult detectives). In his quest for revenge for having been ousted from the group, Gravel must collect each magician's piece of the manuscript, but spends most of the third issue hearing about Thomas Carnacki (including an extended homage to "The Whistling Room" and the particular writing style Hodgson used when writing the Carnacki stories).

Previously, Warren Ellis had included the Sigsand Manuscript in the 13th issue of his ongoing Planetary series. It is picked up by Elijah Snow from Sherlock Holmes' book shelf. Carnacki himself is referenced as a member of the Conspiracy, a shadowy cabal among whose number also includes Sherlock Holmes, Count Dracula, Victor Frankenstein, and the Invisible Man, who a young Snow investigates.

=== Sherlock Holmes: The Breath of God ===
In 2012, a Sherlock Holmes pastiche novel by Guy Adams was published that featured Carnacki.

=== Parodies ===
David Langford's 1988 parody collection The Dragonhiker's Guide to Battlefield Covenant at Dune's Edge: Odyssey Two contains a parody of "The Gateway of the Monster", in which the creature manifests not as a human hand, but as another body part entirely.

Rick Kennett has also written a parody of "The Whistling Room" called "The Sniffling Room", published in The Goblin Muse, April 2000. In this brief story, rather than receiving an invitation and then eagerly attending Carnacki's storytelling evenings, the attending gentlemen are instead kidnapped, dragged to Carnacki's home, and forced to listen against their will to a tale told by a man they consider to be a raving lunatic. It thus mocks primarily the common framework of the Carnacki stories, rather than Carnacki's actual investigation.

The French writer Gérard Dôle has published a volume of parodies of Carnacki, in which he encounters the likes of Sherlock Holmes and Sâr Dubnotal while two other French writers, Fabrice Colin and André-François Ruaud have given to Thomas Carnacki a nephew, William Carnacki, reporting to his uncle the life in a parallel world where most monsters do exist (children book Le Livre des monstres—Chroniques du monde noir, 2008).

Anton LaVey, founder and High Priest of the Church of Satan, named his son "Satan Xerxes Carnacki LaVey".

=== The Adventure of the Haunted Library ===
August Derleth, whose Arkham House publishing firm issued the first American (and first expanded edition) of Carnacki, the Ghost-Finder, pays affectionate tribute to the character in one of his Solar Pons stories. While Carnacki does not actually appear in the story, it is mentioned several times in "The Adventure of the Haunted Library" (which appears in The Casebook of Solar Pons (1965)) that Carnacki was called in to investigate the case, but having been unable to solve it, thereafter referred it to Solar Pons.

== See also ==
- Occult detective fiction
