= A Praed Street Dossier =

Book by August Derleth

- Dust-jacket illustration by Frank Utpatel for A Praed Street Dossier
- Author: August Derleth
- Illustrator: Frank Utpatel
- Cover artist: Frank Utpatel
- Language: English
- Series: Solar Pons
- Genre: Detective, Science fiction essays
- Publisher: Mycroft & Moran
- Publication date: 1968
- Publication place: United States
- Media type: Print (hardback)
- Pages: 108
- Preceded by: The Casebook of Solar Pons
- Followed by: Mr. Fairlie's Final Journey

A Praed Street Dossier is a collection of detective fiction short stories, essays and marginalia by author August Derleth. It was released in 1968 by Mycroft & Moran in an edition of 2,904 copies and was illustrated by Frank Utpatel. It was an associational collection to Derleth's Solar Pons series of pastiches of the Sherlock Holmes tales of Arthur Conan Doyle. The two science fiction stories, "The Adventure of the Snitch in Time" and "The Adventure of the Ball of Nostradamus", written with Mack Reynolds, were originally published in The Magazine of Fantasy and Science Fiction.

An earlier edition of the volume was released by Peter Ruber's Candlelight Press: Ms Praed Street Papers. Issued in stiff pictorial wrappers only, with dustjacket, it featured the same Frank Utpatel dustjacket artwork as the later Mycroft & Moran edition. Praed Street Papers begins with an Introduction by Peter Ruber that describes a weekend spent with August Derleth and ends with "a Tentative Chronology of Solar Pons" based on the Robert Pattrick Chronology. (Robert Pattrick, a Pontine scholar of the first order, had nearly completed a chronology of Derleth’s Solar Pons cases when he died in 1960. August Derleth made a few revisions to “complete it” and it was included in The Reminiscences of Solar Pons. Pattrick's Chronology only addressed adventures chronicled in the book collections and not those included in magazines).

Praed Street Papers includes essays 1-4 that were reprinted in A Praed Street Dossier. The fictional "From the Notebooks of Dr Lyndon Parker" is included, but without "The Adventure of the Bookseller's Clerk." It also includes a section called "The Pictured Pons" which features comic-strip versions of "The Adventure of the Limping Man" and "The Adventure of the Missing tenants." Frank Utpatel tried the pictured strips in the 1930s, but after two rejections gave up the project. Derleth suggests that the essential flaw in the strip was "its extreme wordiness and lack of action."

== Contents ==
A Praed Street Dossier contains the following:

Solar Pons Marginalia

1. "The Beginnings of Solar Pons" [revised from its first appearance in The Baker Street Gasogene, 1, No 4 (May 1962)].
2. "The Sources of the Tales"
3. "Concerning Dr. Parker's Background"
4. "The Favorite Pastiches"
5. "From the Notebooks of Dr. Lyndon Parker"

"The Adventure of the Bookseller's Clerk" [a separate Pons story embedded within the text of #5]

Solar Pons, Off-Trail

1. "The Adventure of the Snitch in Time" (with Mack Reynolds)
2. "The Adventure of the Ball of Nostradamus" (with Mack Reynolds)

Some material from Praed Street Papers was omitted from A Praed Street Dossier. This material includes the Peter Ruber introduction; the "Tentative Chronology of Solar Pons"; and 'The Pictured Pons."

== Sources ==
- Jaffery, Sheldon (1989). The Arkham House Companion. Mercer Island, WA: Starmont House, Inc. p. 88. ISBN 1-55742-005-X.
- Chalker, Jack L.; Mark Owings (1998). The Science-Fantasy Publishers: A Bibliographic History, 1923-1998. Westminster, MD and Baltimore: Mirage Press, Ltd. p. 845.
- Joshi, S.T. (1999). Sixty Years of Arkham House: A History and Bibliography. Sauk City, WI: Arkham House. p. 181. ISBN 0-87054-176-5.
- Nielsen, Leon (2004). Arkham House Books: A Collector's Guide. Jefferson, NC and London: McFarland & Company, Inc. p. 152. ISBN 0-7864-1785-4.
