= The Dragnet Solar Pons et al. =

- Cover illustration for The Dragnet Solar Pons et al.
- Author: August Derleth
- Language: English
- Series: Solar Pons
- Genre: Detective
- Publisher: Battered Silicon Dispatch Box
- Publication date: 2011
- Publication place: Canada
- Media type: Print (Paperback)
- Pages: 339 pp
- ISBN: 978-1-55246-848-7
- OCLC: 294640011
- Preceded by: The Original Text Solar Pons Omnibus Edition

The Dragnet Solar Pons et al. is a collection of detective short stories by author August Derleth. It was released in 2011 by Battered Silicon Dispatch Box. It is a collection of Derleth's Solar Pons stories which are pastiches of the Sherlock Holmes tales of Arthur Conan Doyle.

These are the original versions of the stories as they appeared in Dragnet magazine, Detective Trails magazine, Gangster Stories magazine, and original unpublished manuscripts. Notes by Mark Wardecker compare the text of the stories to the later, anthologized versions and point out parallels to the Sherlock Holmes stories.

This collection was recommended (but not shortlisted) for a 2012 British Fantasy Award.

Mark Wardecker edited a revised and expanded edition of this book that was published by Belanger Books in 2023: The Arrival of Solar Pons: Manuscripts and Pulp Magazine Appearances of the Sherlock Holmes of Praed Street.

== Contents ==
The Dragnet Solar Pons et al. (2011) contains the following tales:

- Introduction by Mark Wardecker
1. "The Adventure of the Black Narcissus"
2. "The Adventure of the Missing Tenants"
3. "The Adventure of the Broken Chessman"
4. "The Adventure of the Late Mr. Faversham"
5. "The Adventure of the Limping Man"
6. "Two Black Buttons"
7. "The Adventure of the Red Dwarfs"
8. "The Adventure of Gresham Marshes"
9. "The Adventure of the Black Cardinal"
10. "The Adventure of the Norcross Riddle"
11. "The Adventure of the Yarpool Horror"
12. "The Adventure of the Muttering Man"
- Notes by Mark Wardecker

The Arrival of Solar Pons: Manuscripts and Pulp Magazine Appearances of the Sherlock Holmes of Praed Street (2023) contains the following tales:

- Acknowledgements by Mark Wardecker
- Introduction to the current edition by Mark Wardecker
- Introduction to the first edition by Mark Wardecker
- Pulp Magazine
1. "The Adventure of the Black Narcissus"
2. "The Adventure of the Missing Tenants"
3. "The Adventure of the Broken Chessman"
4. "The Adventure of the Late Mr. Faversham"
5. "The Adventure of the Limping Man"
6. "The Adventure of the Black Cardinal"
- Manuscripts
1. "The Adventure of the Black Narcissus"
2. "The Adventure of the Red Dwarfs"
3. "The Adventure of Gresham Marshes"
4. "The Adventure of the Black Cardinal"
5. "The Adventure of the Norcross Riddle"
6. "The Adventure of the Yarpool Horror"
7. "The Adventure of the Muttering Man"
- Appendix
1. "The Adventure of Gresham Marshes"
2. "Two Black Buttons"
- Notes by Mark Wardecker
