= The Solar Pons Omnibus =

1982 collection of detective fiction stories by August Derleth

- Author: August Derleth
- Illustrator: Frank Utpatel
- Language: English
- Series: Solar Pons
- Genre: Detective fiction short stories
- Publisher: Arkham House
- Publication date: 1982
- Publication place: United States
- Media type: Print (hardback)
- Pages: viii, 1306
- ISBN: 0-87054-009-2 (v. 1), 0-87054-010-6 (v. 2), 0-87054-006-8 (set)
- OCLC: 8533564
- Dewey Decimal: 813/.0872/08 19
- LC Class: PS3507.E69 A6 1982

The Solar Pons Omnibus is a collection of detective fiction stories by author August Derleth. It was released in 1982 by Arkham House in an edition of 3,031 copies. The collection was published in two volumes with a slipcase.

The set collects all 71 of the Solar Pons stories by Derleth, which are pastiches of the Sherlock Holmes tales of Arthur Conan Doyle. The collection was edited by Basil Copper and provided with a new foreword by Robert Bloch. The stories are arranged by their internal chronology, rather than by the date of their release. The stories had previously appeared under Arkham House's Mycroft & Moran imprint.

As some fans found Copper's edits objectionable, The Original Text Solar Pons Omnibus Edition was issued in 2000, reverting the stories to the previous versions. The later omnibus also discarded Copper's chronological arrangement in favor of the order in which the stories had appeared in the original Derleth volumes.

== Contents ==
=== Volume One ===
- Foreword by Robert Bloch
- "From the Notebooks of Dr. Lyndon Parker"
1. "The Adventure of the Sotheby Salesman"
2. "The Adventure of Ricoletti of the Clubfoot"
3. "The Adventure of the Unique Dickensians"
4. "The Adventure of the Haunted Library"
5. "The Adventure of the Aluminum Crutch"
6. "The Adventure of the Circular Room"
7. "The Adventure of the Purloined Periapt"
8. "The Adventure of the Lost Locomotive"
9. "The Adventure of the Five Royal Coachmen"
10. "The Adventure of the Frightened Baronet"
11. "The Adventure of the Missing Huntsman"
12. "The Adventure of the Amateur Philologist"
13. "The Adventure of the Seven Sisters"
14. "The Adventure of the Limping Man"
15. "The Adventure of the Shaplow Millions"
16. "The Adventure of the Innkeeper's Clerk"
17. "The Adventure of the Crouching Dog"
18. "The Adventure of the Perfect Husband"
19. "The Adventure of the Dog in the Manger"
20. "The Adventure of the Swedenborg Signatures"
21. "The Adventure of the Spurious Tamerlane"
22. "The Adventure of the Rydberg Numbers"
23. "The Adventure of the Praed Street Irregulars"
24. "The Adventure of the Penny Magenta"
25. "The Adventure of the Remarkable Worm"
26. "The Adventure of the Retired Novelist"
27. "The Adventure of the Missing Tenants"
28. "The Adventure of the Devil's Footprints"
29. "The Adventure of the Sussex Archers"
30. "The Adventure of the Cloverdale Kennels"
31. "The Adventure of the Lost Dutchman"
32. "The Adventure of the Grice-Paterson Curse"
33. "The Adventure of the Dorrington Inheritance"
34. "The Adventure of the Norcross Riddle"
35. "The Adventure of the Late Mr. Faversham"
36. "The Adventure of the Black Narcissus"

=== Volume Two ===
1. "The Adventure of the Three Red Dwarfs"
2. "The Adventure of the Broken Chessman"
3. "The Adventure of the China Cottage"
4. "The Adventure of the Black Cardinal"
5. "The Adventure of the Hats of M. Dulac"
6. "The Adventure of the Little Hangman"
7. "The Adventure of the Man with the Broken Face"
8. "The Adventure of the Benin Bronze"
9. "The Adventure of the Seven Passengers"
10. "The Adventure of the Whispering Knights"
11. "The Adventure of the Intasia Box"
12. "The Adventure of the Six Silver Spiders"
13. "The Adventure of the Stone of Scone"
14. "The Adventure of the Mazarine Blue"
15. "The Adventure of the Red Leech"
16. "The Adventure of the Lost Holiday"
17. "The Adventure of the Blind Clairaudient"
18. "The Adventure of the Proper Comma"
19. "The Adventure of the Bishop's Companion"
20. "The Adventure of the Ascot Scandal"
21. "The Adventure of the 'Triple Kent'"
22. "The Adventure of the Paralytic Mendicant"
23. "The Adventure of the Trained Cormorant"
24. "The Adventure of the Camberwell Beauty"
25. "The Adventure of the Tottenham Werewolf"
26. "The Adventure of the Troubled Magistrate"
27. "The Adventure of the Mosaic Cylinders"
28. "The Adventure of the Fatal Glance"
29. "The Adventure of the Orient Express"
30. Mr. Fairlie's Final Journey
31. "The Adventure of the Golden Bracelet"
32. "The Adventure of the Snitch in Time" (with Mack Reynolds)
33. "The Adventure of the Ball of Nostradamus" (with Mack Reynolds)
