= The Exploits of Solar Pons =

- Dust-jacket from the first edition
- Author: Basil Copper
- Illustrator: Stefanie K. Hawks
- Cover artist: Stefanie K. Hawks
- Language: English
- Series: Solar Pons
- Genre: Detective
- Publisher: Fedogan & Bremer
- Publication date: 1993
- Publication place: United States
- Media type: Print (hardback)
- Pages: 239 pp
- ISBN: 1-878252-11-9
- OCLC: 29998142
- Dewey Decimal: 823/.914 20
- LC Class: PR6053.O658 E97 1993
- Preceded by: The Uncollected Cases of Solar Pons
- Followed by: The Recollections of Solar Pons

The Exploits of Solar Pons is a collection of detective short stories by author Basil Copper. It was released in 1993 by Fedogan & Bremer in an edition of 2,000 copies of which 100 were numbered and signed by the author. The book collects stories about Solar Pons, a character originally created by August Derleth. Derleth's Pons stories are pastiches of the Sherlock Holmes stories of Arthur Conan Doyle.

Confusingly, this title had previously been used by Robson Books UK, 1975, for an omnibus edition of two Pons short story collections. However, the Robson volume is entirely distinct from the Fedogan & Bremer volume of this title by Basil Copper, since the Robson book collects two of August Derleth's original Solar Pons short story collections, The Adventures of Solar Pons (i.e. In Re: Sherlock Holmes) and The Chronicles of Solar Pons, which Robson had also published as standalone volumes in the UK in 1975.

== Contents ==
- "The Adventure of the Verger’s Thumb"
- "The Adventure of the Phantom Face"
- "Death at the Metropole"
- "The Adventure of the Callous Colonel"
