= Arkham's Masters of Horror =

- Dust-jacket illustration by Tony Patrick.
- Editor: Peter Ruber
- Cover artist: Tony Patrick, design by Martin Hertzel
- Language: English
- Genre: Fantasy, Horror
- Publisher: Arkham House
- Publication date: 2000)
- Publication place: United States
- Media type: Print (hardback)
- Pages: xi, 443
- ISBN: 0-87054-177-3
- OCLC: 43561807
- Dewey Decimal: 813/.0873808 21
- LC Class: PS648.H6 A75 2000

Arkham's Masters of Horror is an anthology of fantasy and horror stories edited by Peter Ruber. It was released by Arkham House in an edition of approximately 4,000 copies in 2000. The book includes an introductory essay by Ruber before each story and about its author.

Ruber drew criticism from the horror/fantasy community for the hostility with which he introduced some authors within the volume - for instance, his accusation that H.P. Lovecraft "had a schizoid personality" and could be labelled "a genuine crackpot."

The book was translated into Spanish in 2010 as Maestros del horror de Arkham House (Valdemar).

== Contents ==
Arkham's Masters of Horror contains the following stories:

- "Foreword"
- "Introduction: The 'Un-Demonizing' of August Derleth'", by Peter Ruber
- "H. P. Lovecraft" (essay)
- Excerpts from the H. P. Lovecraft Letters to August Derleth
- "Clark Ashton Smith" (essay)
- "Prince Alcouz and the Magician", by Clark Ashton Smith
- "Donald Wandrei" (essay)
- "Man-Hunt", by Donald Wandrei
- "Robert E. Howard" (essay)
- "The Valley of the Lost", by Robert E. Howard
- "Robert Bloch" (essay)
- "The Bat is My Brother", by Robert Bloch
- "H. Russell Wakefield" (essay)
- "The Latch-Key", by H. Russell Wakefield
- "Carl Jacobi" (essay)
- "Dyak Reward", by Carl Jacobi
- "Henry S. Whitehead" (essay)
- "Sea-Tiger", by Henry S. Whitehead
- "Frank Belknap Long" (essay)
- "The Dog-Eared God", by Frank Belknap Long
- "David H. Keller" (essay)
- "The Beautiful Lady", by David H. Keller
- "E. Hoffman Price" (essay)
- "Sweetheart from the Tomb", by E. Hoffmann Price
- "Greye La Spina" (essay)
- "Wolf of the Steppes", by Greye La Spina
- "Arthur J. Burks" (essay)
- "Rhythmic Formula", by Arthur J. Burks
- "Ray Douglas Bradbury" (essay)
- "The Small Assassin", by Ray Bradbury
- "Howard Wandrei" (essay)
- "George Is All Right", by Howard Wandrei
- "Mary Elizabeth Counselman" (essay)
- "Something Old", by Mary Elizabeth Counselman
- "John Ramsey Campbell" (essay)
- "Property of the Ring", by John Ramsey Campbell
- "Seabury Quinn" (essay)
- "Bon Voyage, Michele", by Seabury Quinn
- "Nelson Bond" (essay)
- "The Master of Cotswold", by Nelson Bond
- "Vincent Starrett" (essay)
- "The Open Window", by Vincent Starrett
- "August Derleth & Mark Schorer" (essay)
- "A Visitor from Outside", by August Derleth & Mark Schorer
