= In Lovecraft's Shadow =

Book by August Derleth

- Jacket illustration by Stephen E. Fabian for In Lovecraft's Shadow
- Author: August Derleth
- Illustrator: Stephen E. Fabian
- Cover artist: Stephen E. Fabian
- Language: English
- Genre: Fantasy, horror
- Publisher: Mycroft & Moran
- Publication date: 1998
- Publication place: Canada
- Media type: Print (hardback)
- Pages: xiv, 351
- ISBN: 1-55246-003-7
- OCLC: 36693519

In Lovecraft's Shadow: The Cthulhu Mythos Stories of August Derleth is a collection of fantasy and horror short stories by American writer August Derleth. It was released in 1998 by Mycroft & Moran in an edition of 2,051 copies.

The stories are part of the Cthulhu Mythos and several had appeared previously in the Arkham House collections: The Mask of Cthulhu (1958), The Trail of Cthulhu (1962) and Colonel Markesan and Less Pleasant People (with Mark Schorer, 1966).

== Contents ==
In Lovecraft's Shadow contains the following tales:

1. "Introduction", by Joseph Wrzos
2. "A Few Words About the Artist", by Joseph Wrzos
3. Part I: Homage, Thricefold
  - "Providence: Two Gentlemen Meet at Midnight"
4. Part II: North Woods Stories: Ithaqua of the Snows & Others
  - "The Thing That Walked on the Wind"
  - "Ithaqua"
  - "Beyond the Threshold"
  - "The Dweller in Darkness"
5. Part III: Collaborations: Non-Lovecraftian
  - "Lair of the Star-Spawn" (with Mark Schorer)
  - "Spawn of the Maelstrom" (with Mark Schorer)
  - "The Horror from the Depths" (with Mark Schorer)
  - "The House in the Oaks" (with Robert E. Howard)
6. Part IV: The Old Ones Abroad
  - "Those Who Seek"
  - "The God-Box"
  - "Something from Out There"
7. Part V: The Mythos in Verse
  - "Incubus"
8. Part VI: Miskatonic Valley Tales: Arkham & Environs
  - "The Return of Hastur"
  - "The Passing of Eric Holm"
  - "The Sandwin Compact"
  - "Something in Wood"
  - "The Whippoorwills in the Hills"
  - "The House in the Valley"
  - "The Seal of R’lyeh"
9. Part VII: On Cthulhu's Trail: The Laban Shrewsbury Stories
  - "The House on Curwen Street: The Manuscript of Andred Phelan"
  - "The Watcher from the Sky: The Deposition of Abel Keane"
  - "The Gorge Beyond Salapunco: "The Testament of Claiborne Boyd"
  - "The Keeper of the Key: The Statement of Nayland Colum"
  - "The Black Island: The Narrative of Horvath Blayne"
10. Part VIII: Coda, Epistolary
  - "On Reading Old Letters. For H.P.L."
11. Part IX: The Mythos in Miniature:
  - "A Note on the Cthulhu Mythos"
12. Notes
13. Appendix: The Derleth Cthulhu Mythos Stories (Excluding the Lovecraft Collaborations) in Order of Publication

== Sources ==
- Chalker, Jack L.; Mark Owings (1998). The Science-Fantasy Publishers: A Bibliographic History, 1923-1998. Westminster, MD and Baltimore: Mirage Press, Ltd. p. 846.
- Joshi, S.T. (1999). Sixty Years of Arkham House: A History and Bibliography. Sauk City, WI: Arkham House. pp. 186–187. ISBN 0-87054-176-5.
- Nielsen, Leon (2004). Arkham House Books: A Collector's Guide. Jefferson, NC and London: McFarland & Company, Inc. pp. 156–157. ISBN 0-7864-1785-4.
