= Three Problems for Solar Pons =

1952 collection of detective fiction short stories by August Derleth

- Dust-jacket by Ronald Clyne.
- Author: August Derleth
- Cover artist: Ronald Clyne
- Language: English
- Series: Solar Pons
- Genre: Detective fiction
- Publisher: Mycroft & Moran
- Publication date: 1952
- Publication place: United States
- Media type: Print (hardback)
- Pages: vii, 112

Three Problems for Solar Pons is a collection of detective fiction short stories by American writer August Derleth. It was released in 1952 by Mycroft & Moran in an edition of 996 copies. It was the third collection of Derleth's Solar Pons stories which are pastiches of the Sherlock Holmes tales of Arthur Conan Doyle. The book was intended as an interim collection and all the stories are reprinted in The Return of Solar Pons. Because of the low print run, it is the scarcest Mycroft & Moran book.

The dustjacket was by artist Ronald Clyne.

== Contents ==
Three Problems for Solar Pons contains the following tales:

1. "A Note for the Aficionado"
2. "The Adventure of the Rydberg Numbers"
3. "The Adventure of the Remarkable Worm"
4. "The Adventure of the Camberwell Beauty"

== Sources ==
- Jaffery, Sheldon (1989). The Arkham House Companion. Mercer Island, WA: Starmont House, Inc. p. 42. ISBN 1-55742-005-X.
- Chalker, Jack L.; Mark Owings (1998). The Science-Fantasy Publishers: A Bibliographic History, 1923-1998. Westminster, MD and Baltimore: Mirage Press, Ltd. p. 844.
- Joshi, S.T. (1999). Sixty Years of Arkham House: A History and Bibliography. Sauk City, WI: Arkham House. p. 179. ISBN 0-87054-176-5.
- Nielsen, Leon (2004). Arkham House Books: A Collector's Guide. Jefferson, NC and London: McFarland & Company, Inc. p. 150. ISBN 0-7864-1785-4.
