= The Recollections of Solar Pons =

- Dust-jacket from the first edition
- Author: Basil Copper
- Illustrator: Stefanie K. Hawks
- Cover artist: Stefanie K. Hawks
- Language: English
- Series: Solar Pons
- Genre: Detective fiction
- Publisher: Fedogan & Bremer
- Publication date: 1995
- Publication place: United States
- Media type: Print (hardback)
- Pages: 249 pp
- ISBN: 1-878252-20-8
- OCLC: 34158245
- Dewey Decimal: 823/.914 20
- LC Class: PR6053.O658 R34 1995
- Preceded by: The Exploits of Solar Pons
- Followed by: Solar Pons Versus The Devil’s Claw

The Recollections of Solar Pons is a collection of detective short stories by author Basil Copper. It was released in 1995 by Fedogan & Bremer in an edition of 2,000 copies of which 100 were numbered and signed by the author. The book collects stories about Solar Pons, a character originally created by August Derleth. Derleth's Pons stories are themselves pastiches of the Sherlock Holmes stories of Arthur Conan Doyle. The first three stories are original to this collection. "The Adventure of the Singular Sandwich" first appeared in Copper's collection The Uncollected Cases of Solar Pons in 1979, but Copper disapproved of how it was edited. Copper's preferred text was first published by Fedogan & Bremer as a chapbook in 1995.

== Contents ==
- "The Adventure of the Mad Millionaire"
- "The Adventure of the Cursed Curator"
- "The Adventure of the Hound of Hell"
- "The Adventure of the Singular Sandwich"
