= The Adventure of the Unique Dickensians =

- cover by Frank Utpatel for The Adventure of the Unique Dickensians
- Author: August Derleth
- Illustrator: Frank Utpatel
- Cover artist: Frank Utpatel
- Language: English
- Series: Solar Pons
- Genre: Detective fiction
- Publisher: Mycroft & Moran
- Publication date: 1968
- Publication place: United States
- Media type: Print (Chapbook)
- Pages: 38
- Preceded by: The Casebook of Solar Pons
- Followed by: Mr. Fairlie's Final Journey

"The Adventure of the Unique Dickensians" is a detective fiction short story by American writer August Derleth. It was released in 1968 by Mycroft & Moran in an edition of 2,012 copies. The 38-page chapbook is illustrated by Frank Utpatel.

Of the Mycroft and Moran edition, 35 copies were bound in black cloth printed in gilt on the spine and front board, likely by collector/publisher Gerry de la Ree and distributed thus probably during the 1980s. The bound copies bear a label affixed to the inside front pastedown with a statement of the copy number, e.g. "#6 of 35 bound copies."

The story is part of Derleth's Solar Pons series of pastiches of the Sherlock Holmes tales of Arthur Conan Doyle. It is a Christmas story about Ebenezer Snawley, an eccentric collector of Dickensiana who dresses in 19th-century clothing and is harassed by a man who bawls street cries near his dwelling.

The story was eventually collected in The Chronicles of Solar Pons.

== Sources ==
- Jaffery, Sheldon (1989). The Arkham House Companion. Mercer Island, WA: Starmont House, Inc. p. 91. ISBN 1-55742-005-X.
- Chalker, Jack L.; Mark Owings (1998). The Science-Fantasy Publishers: A Bibliographic History, 1923-1998. Westminster, MD and Baltimore: Mirage Press, Ltd. p. 845.
- Joshi, S.T. (1999). Sixty Years of Arkham House: A History and Bibliography. Sauk City, WI: Arkham House. p. 182. ISBN 0-87054-176-5.
- Nielsen, Leon (2004). Arkham House Books: A Collector's Guide. Jefferson, NC and London: McFarland & Company, Inc. p. 153. ISBN 0-7864-1785-4.
