= Wisconsin Murders =

1968 collection of true crime accounts written by August Derleth

- Dust-jacket by Ronald Clyne for Wisconsin Murders
- Author: August Derleth
- Cover artist: Ronald Clyne
- Language: English
- Genre: true crime
- Publisher: Mycroft & Moran
- Publication date: 1968
- Publication place: United States
- Media type: Print (Hardback)
- Pages: xi, 222 pp

Wisconsin Murders is a collection of true crime accounts written by author August Derleth. It was released in 1968 by Mycroft & Moran in an edition of 1,958 copies. The stories detail sixteen cases of sudden death in Wisconsin for 1842 to 1926. Three of the accounts had appeared previously in American Weekly and Saint Mystery Magazine.

== Contents ==
Wisconsin Murders contains the following accounts:

1. "Foreword"
2. "Caffee Was A Gallowsbird"
3. "An Affair in Council"
4. "A Jury of His Peers"
5. "A Way With the Ladies"
6. "Coincidence and Dr. Garner"
7. "The Tribulations of Sarah Ingersoll"
8. "A Rival to Xantippe"
9. "A Slight Case of Perjury"
10. "'Hell Hath No Fury...'"
11. "A Village Borgia"
12. "La Follette for the Prosecution"
13. "The Dog in the Night-Time"
14. "Dear Grace"
15. "Hart Gets His Man"
16. "Christmas Package"
17. "The Wolf at the Church Social"
