= Solar Pons =

Fictional detective created by August Derleth

- First appearance: The Adventure of the Black Narcissus
- Created by: August Derleth

In-universe information
- Gender: Male
- Occupation: Consulting detective
- Family: Bancroft Pons (brother)
- Nationality: English

Solar Pons is a fictional detective created by August Derleth as a pastiche of Arthur Conan Doyle's Sherlock Holmes.

Robert Bloch wrote of the series, "During a span of a century there have been literally hundreds of Sherlockian imitations, ranging from parody to direct duplication, but no one except August Derleth ever succeeded in capturing the essential charm of Doyle's original concept... To Pons's exploits he brought not only expertise but evident expression of his respect, appreciation, and affection for the source of their inspiration. Viewed as Holmesian homage or as a character in his own right, Solar Pons became Derleth's personal guide to an enchanted time and place."

== Origin ==
On hearing that Doyle did not plan to write more Sherlock Holmes stories, the young Derleth wrote to him, asking permission to take over the series. Doyle graciously declined, but Derleth, despite having never been to London, set about finding a name that was syllabically similar to "Sherlock Holmes", and wrote his first set of pastiches in 1928, which were published in The Dragnet Magazine in 1929. He would ultimately write more stories about Pons than Conan Doyle did about Holmes.

== Character model ==
Pons is a pastiche of Holmes; the first full book about Solar Pons was published in 1945 titled In Re: Sherlock Holmes: The Adventures of Solar Pons. Like Holmes, Solar Pons has prodigious powers of observation and deduction, and can astound his companions by telling them minute details about people he has only just met, details that he proves to have deduced in seconds of observation. Where Holmes' stories are narrated by his companion Dr. John H. Watson, the Pons stories are narrated by Dr. Lyndon Parker; in the Pons stories, he and Parker share lodgings not at 221B Baker Street but at 7B Praed Street, where their landlady is not Mrs. Hudson but Mrs. Johnson. Whereas Sherlock Holmes has an elder brother, Mycroft Holmes, of even greater gifts, Solar Pons has a brother, Bancroft Pons, to fill the same role. Like Holmes, Pons is physically slender and smokes a pipe filled with "abominable shag". The covers for the books also depict Pons wearing the familiar Holmesian garb of a deerstalker cap and Inverness cape.

The actual Sherlock Holmes also exists in Pons' world: Pons and Parker are aware of the famous detective and hold him in high regard. Whereas Holmes' adventures took place primarily in the 1880s and 1890s, Pons and Parker live in the 1920s and 1930s. Pons fans also regard Derleth as having given Pons his own distinctly different personality, far less melancholy and brooding than Holmes's.

The Pons stories also cross over at times with the writings of others, such as Derleth's real-life literary correspondent H. P. Lovecraft in "The Adventure of the Six Silver Spiders", and with Carnacki the Ghost-Finder, the fictional creation of author William Hope Hodgson in "The Adventure of the Haunted Library". Pons has several encounters with Sax Rohmer's Dr. Fu Manchu (referred to solely as "The Doctor") in "The Adventure of the Seven Sisters", "The Adventure of the Praed Street Irregulars", and "The Adventure of the Camberwell Beauty".

The tales in the Pontine canon can be broadly divided into two classes: the straight and the humorous, the straight being more or less straightforward tales of detection in the classic Holmesian mode, while the others—a minority—have some gentle fun, most notably by involving fictional characters from outside either canon (e.g., Dr. Fu Manchu); perhaps the most outstanding example is "The Adventure of the Orient Express", which features thinly disguised versions of Ashenden, Hercule Poirot, and the Saint.

Several Pons stories have titles taken from "unrecorded" cases of Holmes to which Watson alluded, including those of "Ricoletti of the Club Foot (and his Abominable Wife)", "The Aluminium Crutch", "The Black Cardinal", and "The Politician, the Lighthouse, and the Trained Cormorant". Others are variants on Holmesian tales, such as "The Adventure of the Tottenham Werewolf", paralleling (in some ways) Holmes' "Adventure of the Sussex Vampire".

"The Adventure of the Orient Express" was first issued as a standalone chapbook by Peter Ruber's Candlelight Press. There were two printings – May 1965 and September 1965. It was later included in the collection The Chronicles of Solar Pons. "The Adventure of the Unique Dickensians" was also issued as a standalone chapbook (Mycroft & Moran, 1968, 2012 copies). This story also was collected in The Chronicles of Solar Pons.

== Stories by Basil Copper ==
After Derleth's death in 1971, further stories about the character were written by the author Basil Copper. The first four of these volumes were published by Pinnacle Books: The Dossier of Solar Pons, The Further Adventures of Solar Pons, The Secret Files of Solar Pons and The Uncollected Cases of Solar Pons (original UK title: Some Uncollected Cases of Solar Pons) (all 1979).

A further two volumes of Copper's continuations were published by Fedogan and Bremer: The Exploits of Solar Pons (1993) and The Recollections of Solar Pons (1995). Fedogan and Bremer also issued a limited edition chapbook of Copper's preferred text of the story "The Adventure of the Singular Sandwich".

Later, Sarob Press published two further volumes of Pons work by Copper: the novel Solar Pons Versus the Devil's Claw (2004) and a collection titled Solar Pons: The Final Cases (2005) which contains six stories, five being revised editions of earlier Copper Pons contributions, and one Sherlock Holmes story ("The Adventure of the Persecuted Painter").

Most recently, PS Publishing reissued all of Copper's Pons stories in 6 volumes, adding a 7th volume entitled The Solar Pons Companion, which contains related non-fiction and assorted materials.

== Omnibus editions ==
Copper also edited Derleth's Pons stories for Arkham House under the title The Solar Pons Omnibus. In addition to his extensive edits, in which Copper "rather controversially corrected many errors and adjusted many Americanisms," he arranged the stories in order of their internal chronology, rather than by release date.

A later omnibus, The Original Text Solar Pons Omnibus Edition, was issued by Mycroft & Moran in 2000, reverting the stories to Derleth's original versions, and printing them in order of publication.

== Solar Pons societies and journals ==
A society, the Praed Street Irregulars (PSI), was dedicated to Solar Pons. The Irregulars were founded by Luther Norris with assistance from Peter Ruber in 1966 in the style of the better-known Baker Street Irregulars. The PSI produced a newsletter, later a journal, the Pontine Dossier, published by The Pontine Press between 1967 and 1977 for 15 issues.

A branch, The London Solar Pons Society, was established in England headed by Roger Johnson. Other branches were established in other areas.

Though it is not formally associated with the Praed Street Irregulars, publication of The Solar Pons Gazette began in 2006 as an online journal.

In more recent times, Belanger Books has revived The Pontine Dossier as The Pontine Dossier: Millennium Edition, a print journal, with six annual numbers published to date.

== List of Solar Pons books ==
=== By August Derleth ===
- "In Re: Sherlock Holmes": The Adventures of Solar Pons a.k.a. Regarding Sherlock Holmes: The Adventures of Solar Pons (in the UK: The Adventures of Solar Pons) (1945)
- The Memoirs of Solar Pons (1951)
- Three Problems for Solar Pons (1952) – the contents of this book later appeared in The Return of Solar Pons
- The Return of Solar Pons (1958)
- The Reminiscences of Solar Pons (1961)
- The Casebook of Solar Pons (1965)
- A Praed Street Dossier (1968)
- The Adventure of the Unique Dickensians (Mycroft and Moran, 1968) Single-story chapbook. Reprinted in The Chronicles of Solar Pons
- Mr. Fairlie's Final Journey (1968) – novel
- The Chronicles of Solar Pons (1973)
- The Solar Pons Omnibus (1982)
- The Unpublished Solar Pons (1994)
  - Introduction by Paul B. Smeadegaard
  - "A Pontine Commentary" by Ted Schulz
  - "Revised List of the Solar Pons Canon Abbreviations"
  - "The Adventure of the Viennese Musician"
  - "The Adventure of the Muttering Man"
  - "The Adventure of the Sinister House" (an early and incomplete version of "The Adventure of the Burlstone Horror")
  - "In Re: Solar Pons" by Roger Johnson
  - "A Pontine Competition" by James Turner
  - "The Adventure of the Green Stars" (fragment)
  - Afterword by George A. Vanderburgh
- The Final Adventures of Solar Pons (1998) - includes "More from Dr. Parker's Notebooks"
- The Original Text Solar Pons Omnibus Edition (Mycroft & Moran/Battered Silicon Dispatch Box,2000)
- The Dragnet Solar Pons et al. (Battered Silicon Dispatch Box, 2011) – original pulp magazine and manuscript versions of these stories.
- The Novels of Solar Pons: Terror Over London and Mr. Fairlie's Final Journey (2018)
- The Apocrypha of Solar Pons (2018) – includes works from A Praed Street Dossier, Unpublished Solar Pons, The Final Adventures of Solar Pons and others - 17 August 1919 to 24 February 1920 including “The Adventure of the Bookseller’s Clerk.”
- The Rediscovered Cases
  - The Adventure of Gresham Old Place
  - The Adventure of the Burlstone Horror
  - The Adventure of the Viennese Musician
  - The Adventure of the Muttering Man
  - A Fragmentary Adventure
  - The Adventure of the Green Stars
  - The Adventure of the Circular Room
  - A Sherlock Holmes Adventure
  - August Derleth Explains...
- Solar Pons Off-Trail (with Mack Reynolds)
  - The Adventure of the Snitch in Time
  - The Adventure of the Ball of Nostradamus
  - The Adventure of the Nosferatu
  - The Adventure of the Extra-Terrestrial
- The Arrival of Solar Pons: Early Manuscripts and Pulp Magazine Appearances of the Sherlock Holmes of Praed Street (2023) - a revised and expanded version of The Dragnet Solar Pons et al.
- Pulp Magazine Stories
  - The Adventure of the Black Narcissus
  - The Adventure of the Missing Tenants
  - The Adventure of the Broken Chessman
  - The Adventure of the Late Mr. Faversham
  - The Adventure of the Limping Man
  - The Adventure of the Black Cardinal
- Manuscripts
  - The Adventure of the Black Narcissus
  - The Adventure of the Red Dwarfs
  - The Adventure of Gresham Marshes
  - The Adventure of the Black Cardinal
  - The Adventure of the Norcross Riddle
  - The Adventure of the Yarpool Horror
  - The Adventure of the Muttering Man
- Appendix
  - The Adventure of Gresham Marshes
  - Two Black Buttons
- Black Narcissus: Best Adventures of Solar Pons, Volume One. Edited by S.T. Joshi. (Seattle WA: Sarnath Press, 2025). An omnibus containing Joshi's selection of the 'best' stories from the first three Arkham House collections of Solar Pons tales. Will be followed by a second volume selecting the 'best' tales from the last three Arkham House Pons collections.

=== By Basil Copper ===
- The Dossier of Solar Pons (1979)
  - "The Adventure of the Perplexed Photographer"
  - "The Adventure of the Sealed Spire"
  - "The Adventure of the Six Gold Doubloons"
  - "The Adventure of the Ipi Idol"
  - "The Adventure of Buffington Old Grange"
  - "The Adventure of the Hammer of Hate"
- The Further Adventures of Solar Pons (1979)
  - "The Adventure of the Shaft of Death"
  - "The Adventure of the Defeated Doctor"
  - "The Adventure of the Surrey Sadist"
  - "The Adventure of the Missing Student"
- The Secret Files of Solar Pons (1979)
  - "The Adventure of the Crawling Horror"
  - "The Adventure of the Anguished Actor"
  - "The Adventure of the Ignored Idols"
  - "The Adventure of the Horrified Heiress"
- The Uncollected Cases of Solar Pons (1979) - (in the UK: Some Uncollected Cases of Solar Pons)
  - "The Adventure of the Haunted Rectory"
  - "The Adventure of the Singular Sandwich"
  - "Murder at the Zoo"
  - "The Adventure of the Frightened Governess"
- The Exploits of Solar Pons (1993)
  - "The Adventure of the Callous Colonel"
  - "The Adventure of the Phantom Face"
  - "The Adventure of the Verger's Thumb"
  - "Death at the Metropole"
- The Recollections of Solar Pons (1995)
  - "The Adventure of the Cursed Curator"
  - "The Adventure of the Hound of Hell"
  - "The Adventure of the Mad Millionaire"
  - "The Adventure of the Singular Sandwich" – reworked from its first appearance in Uncollected Cases
- Solar Pons Versus The Devil's Claw (2004, Sarob Press) [novel]
- Solar Pons: The Final Cases (2005, Sarob Press)
  - "The Adventures of The Haunted Rectory" – reworked from its first appearance in Uncollected Cases
  - "The Ignored Idols" – reworked from its first appearance in Secret Files
  - "The Adventure of the Horrified Heiress" – reworked from its first appearance in Secret Files
  - "The Adventure of the Baffled Baron" – reworked from its first appearance in Dossier as "The Adventure of the Defeated Doctor"
  - "The Adventure of the Anguished Actor" – reworked from its first appearance in Secret Files
  - "The Adventure of the Persecuted Painter" – a Sherlock Holmes pastiche, first published in The Mammoth Book of New Sherlock Holmes Adventures
- The Recollections of Solar Pons (2017, PS Publishing)
  - "The Adventure of the Cursed Curator"
  - "The Adventure of the Hound of Hell"
  - "The Adventure of the Mad Millionaire"
  - The Adventure of the Devil's Claw
- The Solar Pons Companion #7 (2017, PS Publishing) – with Stephen Jones
  - "Once a Pons a Time" by Stephen Jones
  - "Foreword"
  - "In the Footsteps of Sherlock Holmes"
  - "Plots of the Stories"
  - "Characters in the Stories"
  - "The Sayings of Solar Pons"
  - "Solar Pons Plot and Dialogue Notes" by Stephen Jones
  - "The Adventure of the Northleach Stocks" by Stephen Jones
  - "Painting Pons: Artist Ben Stahl" by Stephen Jones
  - The Adventure of the Defeated Doctor"
  - "The Adventure of the Agonised Actor"
  - The Adventure of the Persecuted Painter"

=== By David Marcum ===
- The Papers of Solar Pons (2017)
  - "A Word From Dr. Lyndon Parker"
  - "The Adventure of the Doctor's Box"
  - "The Park Lane Solution"
  - "The Poe Problem"
  - "The Singular Affair of the Blue Girl"
  - "The Plight of the American Driver"
  - "The Adventure of the Blood Doctor"
  - "The Additional Heirs"
  - "The Horror of St. Anne's Row"
  - "The Adventure of the Failed Fellowship"
  - "The Adventure of the Obrisset Snuffbox"
  - "The Folio Matter"
  - "The Affair of the Distasteful Society"
  - "The Adventure of the Other Brother"
- The Further Papers of Solar Pons (2022)
  - "Adventure of the Two Sisters"
  - "Some Additional Events of June 1919"
  - "The Adventure of the South Norwood Builder"
  - "Adventure of the Retired Beekeeper"
  - "The Clue of the Six Weapons"
  - "Little Potton Hoard"
  - "The Moonbow Phantom"
  - "The Trouble of Doom"
  - "The Bizarre Adventure of the Octagon House"
  - "The Manipulative Mesmerist"
  - "The Indifferent Blackmailer"
  - "Man with the Writhing Skin"
  - "The Laboratory Safe"
  - "The Adventure of the Old Score"
  - "A Supplemental Adventure"
- The Singular Papers of Solar Pons (2025)

=== By David Marcum and others ===
- The New Adventures of Solar Pons (2019)
  - "The Adventure of the Two Sisters" by David Marcum
  - "The Adventure of the Inconvenient Death" by Jeremy Branton Holstein
  - "Pages From the Notebooks of Dr. Lyndon Parker" by Bob Byrne
  - "The Adventure of the Last Casualty" by Mark Wardecker
  - "The Misadventure of the Norfolk Poacher" by Mark Mower
  - "The Impersonating Detective" by Jayantika Ganguly
  - "The Jazz Murders" by Thomas Fortenberry
  - "The Adventure of the Versailles Tourist" by Robert Stapleton
  - "The Adventure of the Yorkshire Girl" by Stephen Herczeg
  - "The Adventure of the London Jinx" by John Linwood Grant
  - "The Mechanical Problem" by Robert Perret
  - "The Adventure of the Scottish Rite" by Stephen Herczeg
  - "The Squirming Script" by I.A. Watson
  - "The Adventure of the Yellow Pimpernel" by Nik Morton
  - "The Adventure of the Borzoi Breeder" by Deanna Baran
  - "The Adventure of the Earl's Mirth" by Mark Wardecker
  - "The Watson Club" by Derrick Belanger
  - "The Boar of the Raskerbergs" by Robert Stapleton
  - "The Black Mouth of Death" by Thomas Fortenberry
  - "The Adventure of the Old Score" by David Marcum
- The Necronomicon of Solar Pons (2020)
  - "The Rondure of Cthulhu" by Stephen Herczeg
  - "The Meandering Mathematician" by Robert Perret
  - "A Matter of Blood" by Nick Cardillo
  - "To Everything There is a Season" by Stephen Persing
  - "The Adventure of the Book and the Gate" by Eleanor Sciolistein
  - "Solar Pons and the Testament in Ice" by Jeff Baker
  - "The Adventure of the Drowned Genealogist" by I.A. Watson
  - "The Man with the Writhing Skin" by David Marcum
  - "The Devil's Tongue of Blue John Gap" by Derrick Belanger
- The Meeting of the Minds: The Cases of Sherlock Holmes & Solar Pons (2 volumes, 2021)
  - "The Serpentine Angel" by Sean Venning
  - "His Last Bow Redux" by Sir Arthur Conan Doyle and David Marcum
  - "The Adventure of the Duplicate Detective" by Thomas A. Burns, Jr.
  - "The Toledo Dagger" by John Linwood Grant
  - "The Case of the Broken Needle" by Naching T. Kassa
  - "The Adventure of Yesterday's Morrow" by Andrew Salmon
  - "The Bizarre Adventure of the Octagon House" by David Marcum
  - "The Croaking Creeper" by Derrick Belanger
  - "The Case of the Learned Linguist" by Mark Mower
  - "Doctor Parker's Patience" by Harry DeMaio
  - "The Adventure of the Perfect Murder" by Nick Cardillo
  - "The Norbury Adventure" by Thaddeus Tuffentsamer
  - "The Poison Child" by Jayantika Ganguly
  - "The Adventure of the Wisconsin Hodag" by Chris Chan
  - "The Adventure of the Retired Beekeeper" by David Marcum
  - "The Adventure of the Retired Judge" by Stephen Herczeg
  - "The Sorcerer and His Apprentice" by Robert Stapleton
  - "The Adventure of the Illiterate Informant" by I.A. Watson
- The Novellas of Solar Pons (2022)
  - "The Adventure of Mack the Chipper" by Chris Chan
  - "The Adventure of the Immortal Dead Man" by David Marcum
  - "The Devil's Book" by Nick Cardillo
  - "The Goblins of Faegan Hill" by Derrick Belanger
- The American Adventures of Solar Pons (2024)
- Solar Pons: A Year of Mystery 1919 (TBP 2026)
