= The Final Adventures of Solar Pons =

1998 collection of detective science fiction short stories by August Derleth

- Dust-jacket illustration by Jean-Pierre Cagnat.
- Author: August Derleth
- Cover artist: Jean-Pierre Cagnat
- Language: English
- Series: Solar Pons
- Genre: Detective, science fiction
- Publisher: Mycroft & Moran
- Publication date: 1998
- Publication place: Canada
- Media type: Print (hardback)
- Pages: xvi, 202
- ISBN: 1-55246-012-6
- OCLC: 36693586
- Preceded by: The Chronicles of Solar Pons

The Final Adventures of Solar Pons is a collection of detective science fiction short stories by author August Derleth. It was released in 1998 by Mycroft & Moran. It is a collection of Derleth's Solar Pons stories which are pastiches of the Sherlock Holmes tales of Arthur Conan Doyle.

== Contents ==
The Final Adventures of Solar Pons contains the following tales:

- "Introduction", by Peter Ruber
- "Reception in Elysium" (poem) by Mary F. Lindsley
- Terror Over London [novel]
- "The Adventures of Gresham Old Place"
- "The Adventure of the Burlstone Horror"
- "The Adventure of the Viennese Musician"
- "The Adventure of the Muttering Man"
- "The Adventure of the Two Collaborators", by Peter Ruber
- "The Adventure of the Nosferatu" (with Mack Reynolds)
- "The Adventure of the Extra-Terrestrial" (with Mack Reynolds)
- "More from Dr. Parker's Notebooks"

== Sources ==
- Chalker, Jack L.; Mark Owings (1998). The Science-Fantasy Publishers: A Bibliographic History, 1923-1998. Westminster, MD and Baltimore: Mirage Press, Ltd. p. 846.
- Joshi, S.T. (1999). Sixty Years of Arkham House: A History and Bibliography. Sauk City, WI: Arkham House. p. 186. ISBN 0-87054-176-5.
- Nielsen, Leon (2004). Arkham House Books: A Collector's Guide. Jefferson, NC and London: McFarland & Company, Inc. p. 156. ISBN 0-7864-1785-4.
