= Phantom Fighter (disambiguation) =

Phantom Fighter may refer to:

- The Phantom Fighter, a short novel released in 1966
- Phantom Fighter, a video game released in 1988
- P-47: The Phantom Fighter, a video game released in 1988
