= The Phantom Fighter =

1966 short stories by Seabury Quinn

- Dust-jacket illustration by Frank Utpatel for The Phantom-Fighter
- Author: Seabury Quinn
- Cover artist: Frank Utpatel
- Language: English
- Genre: Supernatural fiction, detective fiction
- Publisher: Mycroft & Moran
- Publication date: 1966
- Publication place: United States
- Media type: Print (hardback)
- Pages: 263 pp

The Phantom Fighter is a collection of Occult detective short stories by author Seabury Quinn. It was released in 1966 by Mycroft & Moran in an edition of 2,022 copies. The stories are about Quinn's detective Jules de Grandin and were originally published in the magazine Weird Tales. Quinn was still alive in 1966, and he revised and modernized the stories in this collection.

== Contents ==
The Phantom Fighter contains the following tales:

1. "Terror on the Links"
2. "The Dead Hand"
3. "Children of Ubasti"
4. "The Jest of Warburg Tantavul"
5. "The Corpse-Master"
6. "The Poltergeist"
7. "The Wolf of Saint Bonnet"
8. "Restless Souls"
9. "The Silver Countess"
10. "The Doom of the House of Phipps"
