= The Memoirs of Solar Pons =

1951 collection of detective fiction short stories by August Derleth

- Dust-jacket illustration by Frank Utpatel for The Memoirs of Solar Pons
- Author: August Derleth
- Cover artist: Frank Utpatel
- Language: English
- Series: Solar Pons
- Genre: Detective fiction
- Publisher: Mycroft & Moran
- Publication date: 1951
- Publication place: United States
- Media type: Print (hardback)
- Pages: xxii, 245
- Preceded by: In Re: Sherlock Holmes
- Followed by: The Return of Solar Pons

The Memoirs of Solar Pons is a collection of detective fiction short stories by American writer August Derleth. It was released in 1951 by Mycroft & Moran in an edition of 2,038 copies. It was the second collection of Derleth's Solar Pons stories which are pastiches of the Sherlock Holmes tales of Arthur Conan Doyle.

This volume of the Solar Pons series was also sold for book club publication. In 1951 Unicorn Mystery Book Club (New York) issued an omnibus including Memoirs of Solar Pons (alongside The Beautiful Stranger by Bernice Carey, Fish Lane by Louis Corkill, and Hangman’s Hat by Paul Ernst). The Unicorn omnibuses were edited (apparently anonymously) by Hans Stefan Santesson. Memoirs was the only volume of the Solar Pons series to be published as a book club edition as well as by Arkham House.

== Contents ==
The Memoirs of Solar Pons contains the following tales:

1. "Introduction", by Ellery Queen
2. "The Adventure of the Circular Room"
3. "The Adventure of the Perfect Husband"
4. "The Adventure of the Broken Chessman"
5. "The Adventure of the Dog in the Manger"
6. "The Adventure of the Proper Comma"
7. "The Adventure of Ricoletti of the Club Foot"
8. "The Adventure of the Six Silver Spiders"
9. "The Adventure of the Lost Locomotive"
10. "The Adventure of the Tottenham Werewolf"
11. "The Adventure of the Five Royal Coachmen"
12. "The Adventure of the Paralytic Mendicant"

== Reprints ==
- Los Angeles: Pinnacle, 1975.

== Summary of Solar Pons cases ==
- Solar Pons
