= The Adventure of the Singular Sandwich =

- Cover of the first edition
- Author: Basil Copper
- Illustrator: Stefanie K. Hawks
- Cover artist: Stefanie K. Hawks
- Language: English
- Series: Solar Pons
- Genre: Detective short story
- Publisher: Fedogan & Bremer
- Publication date: 1995
- Publication place: United States
- Media type: Print (Paperback)
- Pages: 44, vi pp

"The Adventure of the Singular Sandwich" is a detective short story by author Basil Copper. It first appeared in Copper's collection The Uncollected Cases of Solar Pons in 1979, but Copper disapproved of the way that it was edited. Copper's preferred text was published as a chapbook in 1995 by Fedogan & Bremer in an edition of 1,000 copies of which 950 were distributed to the guests at Bouchercon where Copper was a guest of honor. The chapbook also includes an interview with Copper by R. Dixon Smith. The story is about Solar Pons, a character originally created by August Derleth. Derleth's Pons stories are themselves pastiches of the Sherlock Holmes stories of Arthur Conan Doyle.

== Contents ==
- "The Adventure of the Singular Sandwich"
- "A Conversation With Basil Copper", by R. Dixon Smith
- "A Brief Note on Solar Pons"
