= The Casebook of Solar Pons =

Book by August Derleth

- Dust-jacket illustration by Frank Utpatel.
- Author: August Derleth
- Illustrator: Endpaper map by Luther Norris
- Cover artist: Frank Utpatel
- Language: English
- Series: Solar Pons
- Genre: Detective
- Publisher: Mycroft & Moran
- Publication date: 1965
- Publication place: United States
- Media type: Print (hardback)
- Pages: xviii, 281
- Preceded by: The Reminiscences of Solar Pons
- Followed by: Mr. Fairlie's Final Journey

The Casebook of Solar Pons is a collection of detective fiction short stories by American writer August Derleth. It was released in 1965 by Mycroft & Moran in an edition of 3,020 copies. It was the sixth collection of Derleth's Solar Pons stories which are pastiches of the Sherlock Holmes tales of Arthur Conan Doyle.

The story "The Adventure of the Haunted Library" features a tribute to the William Hope Hodgson character Carnacki the Ghost-Finder, who is said to have initially investigated the case before passing it on to Solar Pons. Derleth published the first American (and first expanded) edition of Carnacki, the Ghost-Finder under his Arkham House imprint.

== Contents ==
The Casebook of Solar Pons contains the following tales:

1. "Foreword", by Vincent Starrett
2. "(Cuthbert) Lyndon Parker", by Michael Harrison
3. "The Adventure of the Sussex Archers"
4. "The Adventure of the Haunted Library"
5. "The Adventure of the Fatal Glance"
6. "The Adventure of the Intarsia Box"
7. "The Adventure of the Spurious Tamerlaine"
8. "The Adventure of the China Cottage"
9. "The Adventure of the Ascot Scandal"
10. "The Adventure of the Crouching Dog"
11. "The Adventure of the Missing Huntsman"
12. "The Adventure of the Amateur Philologist"
13. "The Adventure of the Whispering Knights"
14. "The Adventure of the Innkeeper's Clerk"
15. "Afterword"

== Sources ==
- Jaffery, Sheldon (1989). The Arkham House Companion. Mercer Island, WA: Starmont House, Inc. p. 77. ISBN 1-55742-005-X.
- Chalker, Jack L.; Mark Owings (1998). The Science-Fantasy Publishers: A Bibliographic History, 1923-1998. Westminster, MD and Baltimore: Mirage Press, Ltd. p. 844.
- Joshi, S.T. (1999). Sixty Years of Arkham House: A History and Bibliography. Sauk City, WI: Arkham House. p. 180. ISBN 0-87054-176-5.
- Nielsen, Leon (2004). Arkham House Books: A Collector's Guide. Jefferson, NC and London: McFarland & Company, Inc. pp. 151–152. ISBN 0-7864-1785-4.
