= Joseph Wrzos =

Science fiction writer (1929–2023)

Joseph Henry Wrzos (pronounced "Ross"; September 9, 1929 – April 7, 2023) was a science fiction writer and editor who published most of his early work under the name Joseph Ross.

Born and raised in Newark, New Jersey, Wrzos graduated from Central High School in 1947.

After graduating from Rutgers University in 1952, Wrzos studied at Columbia University, and in 1953 joined Gnome Press, working as an assistant editor where he remained until 1954.

Wrzos also was an editor at Amazing Stories, where he succeeded Cele Goldsmith Lalli and worked under Sol Cohen, and at Fantastic.

Other projects with which he was involved included collaborations with Sam Moskowitz and with Peter Ruber; as well, when Amazing Stories was relaunched in 2012, he served as a consultant.

Wrzos was also an educator and librarian, who first worked as a school librarian at Roselle Park High School and for five years at the Newark Public Library, and who taught English and French at Millburn High School from 1957 to 1995.

Wrzos died on April 7, 2023, in Saddle River, New Jersey.

== Recognition ==
In 2016, Wrzos was inducted into the First Fandom Hall of Fame.
