= Mycroft & Moran =

colophon for Mycroft & Moran designed by Ronald Clyne.

Mycroft & Moran was an imprint of Arkham House publishers and was created in Sauk City, Wisconsin in 1945. The imprint was created to publish weird detective stories and the Solar Pons stories by August Derleth. Arkham retired the imprint in 1982, but has recently allowed it to be revived by another small press publisher.

== Name and Colophon ==
The name of the Mycroft & Moran imprint was derived from two characters in the Sherlock Holmes stories. Mycroft is derived from the name of Sherlock Holmes' brother, Mycroft Holmes. Moran refers to Colonel Sebastian Moran, "the second most dangerous man in London". The colophon for the imprint, a deerstalker, was designed by Ronald Clyne.

== Mycroft & Moran today ==
After the publication of The Solar Pons Omnibus in 1982, Arkham House retired the Mycroft & Moran imprint. In fact, the book was officially an Arkham House publication, merely listing it as "A Mycroft & Moran Book" on the half title page. Later, the imprint was leased to publisher George Vanderburgh (Shelburne, Ontario, Canada), who revived it in 1998 with the publication of The Final Adventures of Solar Pons as part of the Battered Silicon Dispatch Box operation.

== Works published by Mycroft & Moran ==
- The Original Text Solar Pons Omnibus Edition, by August Derleth (2000)
- In Lovecraft's Shadow, by August Derleth (1998)
- The Final Adventures of Solar Pons, by August Derleth (1998)
- The Solar Pons Omnibus, by August Derleth (1982)
- Prince Zaleski and Cummings King Monk, by M. P. Shiel (1977)
- The Chronicles of Solar Pons, by August Derleth (1973)
- Number Seven, Queer Street, by Margery Lawrence (1969)
- Mr. Fairlies's Final Journey, by August Derleth (1968)
- The Adventure of the Unique Dickensians, by August Derleth (1968)
- Wisconsin Murders, by August Derleth (1968)
- The Exploits of Chevalier Dupin, by Michael Harrison (1968)
- A Praed Street Dossier, by August Derleth (1968)
- The Phantom-Fighter, by Seabury Quinn (1966)
- The Casebook of Solar Pons, by August Derleth (1965)
- The Reminiscences of Solar Pons, by August Derleth (1961)
- The Return of Solar Pons, by August Derleth (1958)
- Three Problems for Solar Pons, by August Derleth (1952)
- The Memoirs of Solar Pons, by August Derleth (1951)
- Carnacki, the Ghost-Finder, by William Hope Hodgson (1947)
- "In Re: Sherlock Holmes"--The Adventures of Solar Pons - (a.k.a. Regarding Sherlock Holmes: The Adventures of Solar Pons) - (in the UK: The Adventures of Solar Pons), by August Derleth (1945)
