= The Return of Solar Pons =

1958 collection of detective fiction short stories by August Derleth

- Dust-jacket illustration by Frank Utpatel.
- Author: August Derleth
- Cover artist: Frank Utpatel
- Language: English
- Series: Solar Pons
- Genre: Detective fiction
- Publisher: Mycroft & Moran
- Publication date: 1958
- Publication place: United States
- Media type: Print (hardback)
- Pages: xxii, 245
- Preceded by: The Memoirs of Solar Pons
- Followed by: The Reminiscences of Solar Pons

The Return of Solar Pons is a collection of detective fiction short stories by American writer August Derleth. It was released in 1958 by Mycroft & Moran in an edition of 2,079 copies. It was the fourth collection of Derleth's Solar Pons stories, which are pastiches of the Sherlock Holmes tales of Arthur Conan Doyle.

== Contents ==
The Return of Solar Pons contains the following tales:

1. "Introduction", by Edgar W. Smith
2. "The Adventure of the Lost Dutchman"
3. "The Adventure of the Devil's Footprints"
4. "The Adventure of the Dorrington Inheritance"
5. "The Adventure of the 'Triple Kent'"
6. "The Adventure of the Rydberg Numbers"
7. "The Adventure of the Grice-Paterson Curse"
8. "The Adventure of the Stone of Scone"
9. "The Adventure of the Remarkable Worm"
10. "The Adventure of the Penny Magenta"
11. "The Adventure of the Trained Cormorant"
12. "The Adventure of the Camberwell Beauty"
13. "The Adventure of the Little Hangman"
14. "The Adventure of the Swedenborg Signatures"

== Sources ==
- Jaffery, Sheldon (1989). The Arkham House Companion. Mercer Island, WA: Starmont House, Inc. pp. 48–49. ISBN 1-55742-005-X.
- Chalker, Jack L.; Mark Owings (1998). The Science-Fantasy Publishers: A Bibliographic History, 1923-1998. Westminster, MD and Baltimore: Mirage Press, Ltd. p. 844.
- Joshi, S.T. (1999). Sixty Years of Arkham House: A History and Bibliography. Sauk City, WI: Arkham House. p. 179. ISBN 0-87054-176-5.
- Nielsen, Leon (2004). Arkham House Books: A Collector's Guide. Jefferson, NC and London: McFarland & Company, Inc. p. 151. ISBN 0-7864-1785-4.
