= William F. Thompson =

American lawyer, teacher and politician

Florida House of Representatives
- In office 1887–1888

Personal details
- Born: October 15, 1852 Thomas County, Georgia, U.S.
- Died: Unknown
- Party: Republican

William F. Thompson (1852 – ?) was a lawyer, law school teacher, justice of the peace, tax assessor, state legislator, and delegate to Florida's 1885 Constitutional Convention.

== Biography ==
Thompson was born October 15, 1852, in Thomas County, Georgia, and his only formal education was in common schools. He was African American.

He was married, had two children and was a member of the African Methodist Church.

Thomson was appointed as Justice of the Peace from 1872 until 1873 and again in 1874.

He represented Leon County, Florida, in the Florida House of Representatives in 1877 as a Republican.

In 1884 he served as the city tax assessor for Tallahassee, Florida and again in 1887.

He was a delegate at the 1885 Florida Constitutional Convention also representing Leon County. At the convention, he voted for the article for education to establish, maintain and manage normal schools funded by a poll tax with equal distribution for "white and colored children", even though it included segregation. He was a signatory on the final Constitution of 1885 signed August 3, 1885.

His death is unknown but he was still alive in Tallahassee in 1891.

== See also ==
- African American officeholders from the end of the Civil War until before 1900
