= The Chronicles of Solar Pons =

1973 collection of detective fiction short stories by August Derleth

- Dust-jacket illustration by Frank Utpatel for The Chronicles of Solar Pons
- Author: August Derleth
- Cover artist: Frank Utpatel
- Language: English
- Series: Solar Pons
- Genre: Detective
- Publisher: Mycroft & Moran
- Publication date: 1973
- Publication place: United States
- Media type: Print (hardback)
- Pages: ix, 237 pp
- Preceded by: Mr. Fairlie's Final Journey
- Followed by: The Final Adventures of Solar Pons

The Chronicles of Solar Pons is a collection of detective fiction short stories by author August Derleth. It is the sixth volume in the series of Derleth's Solar Pons short stories, and was released in 1973 by Mycroft & Moran in an edition of 4,176 copies.

== Contents ==
The Chronicles of Solar Pons contains the following tales:

1. "Introduction", by Allen J. Hubin
2. "The Adventure of the Red Leech"
3. "The Adventure of the Orient Express" (Note: This novelette had been first published as a stand-alone chapbook by Candlelight Press, NY, 1965 as a softcover with dustjacket. There were two printings - May and September 1965.).
4. "The Adventure of the Golden Bracelet"
5. "The Adventure of the Shaplow Millions"
6. "The Adventure of the Benin Bronze"
7. "The Adventure of the Missing Tenants"
8. "The Adventure of the Aluminum Crutch"
9. "The Adventure of the Seven Sisters"
10. "The Adventure of the Bishop's Companion"
11. "The Adventure of the Unique Dickensians" This story had first been published as a standalone chapbook by Mycroft & Moran, 1968, 2012 copies.

== Reprints ==
- Los Angeles: Pinnacle, 1974.
