= The Reminiscences of Solar Pons =

1961 collection of detective fiction short stories by August Derleth

- Dust-jacket illustration by Frank Utpatel for The Reminiscences of Solar Pons
- Author: August Derleth
- Cover artist: Frank Utpatel
- Language: English
- Series: Solar Pons
- Genre: Detective fiction
- Publisher: Mycroft & Moran
- Publication date: 1961
- Publication place: United States
- Media type: Print (hardback)
- Pages: xi, 199 pp
- Preceded by: The Return of Solar Pons
- Followed by: The Casebook of Solar Pons

The Reminiscences of Solar Pons is a collection of detective fiction short stories by author August Derleth. It was released in 1961 by Mycroft & Moran in an edition of 2,052 copies. It was the fifth collection of Derleth's Solar Pons stories which are pastiches of the Sherlock Holmes tales of Arthur Conan Doyle.

== Contents ==
The Reminiscences of Solar Pons contains the following tales:

1. "Introduction", by Anthony Boucher
2. "The Adventure of the Mazarine Blue"
3. "The Adventure of the Hats of M. Dulac"
4. "The Adventure of the Mosaic Cylinders"
5. "The Adventure of the Praed Street Irregulars"
6. "The Adventure of the Cloverdale Kennels"
7. "The Adventure of the Black Cardinal"
8. "The Adventure of the Troubled Magistrate"
9. "The Adventure of the Blind Clairaudient"
10. "A Chronology of Solar Pons", by Robert Pattrick

== Reprints ==
- Los Angeles: Pinnacle, 1975.
