= In Re: Sherlock Holmes =

1945 collection of detective fiction short stories by August Derleth

"In Re: Sherlock Holmes" -- The Adventures of Solar Pons
- Dust-jacket illustration by Ronald Clyne.
- Author: August Derleth
- Illustrator: Ronald Clyne
- Language: English
- Series: Solar Pons
- Genre: Detective fiction
- Publisher: Mycroft & Moran
- Publication date: 1945
- Publication place: United States
- Media type: Print (hardback)
- Pages: xv, 238
- Followed by: The Memoirs of Solar Pons

"In Re: Sherlock Holmes"—The Adventures of Solar Pons (in the UK it was titled The Adventures of Solar Pons) is a collection of detective fiction short stories by American writer August Derleth. It was released in 1945 by Mycroft & Moran in an edition of 3,604 copies. It was the first book issued under the Mycroft & Moran imprint. The book is the first collection of Derleth's Solar Pons stories. The stories are pastiches of the Sherlock Holmes tales of Arthur Conan Doyle.

== Contents ==
"In Re: Sherlock Holmes"—The Adventures of Solar Pons contains the following tales:

1. "In Re: Solar Pons" by Vincent Starrett
2. "A Word From Dr. Lyndon Parker"
3. "The Adventure of the Frightened Baronet"
4. "The Adventure of the Late Mr. Faversham"
5. "The Adventure of the Black Narcissus"
6. "The Adventure of the Norcross Riddle"
7. "The Adventure of the Retired Novelist"
8. "The Adventure of the Three Red Dwarfs"
9. "The Adventure of the Sotheby Salesman"
10. "The Adventure of the Purloined Periapt"
11. "The Adventure of the Limping Man"
12. "The Adventure of the Seven Passengers"
13. "The Adventure of the Lost Holiday"
14. "The Adventure of the Man with a Broken Face"

== Sources ==
- Boström, Mattias (2018). From Holmes to Sherlock. Mysterious Press. ISBN 978-0-8021-2789-1.
- Jaffery, Sheldon (1989). The Arkham House Companion. Mercer Island, WA: Starmont House, Inc. pp. 13–14. ISBN 1-55742-005-X.
- Chalker, Jack L.; Mark Owings (1998). The Science-Fantasy Publishers: A Bibliographic History, 1923-1998. Westminster, MD and Baltimore: Mirage Press, Ltd. p. 844.
- Joshi, S.T. (1999). Sixty Years of Arkham House: A History and Bibliography. Sauk City, WI: Arkham House. p. 177. ISBN 0-87054-176-5.
- Nielsen, Leon (2004). Arkham House Books: A Collector's Guide. Jefferson, NC and London: McFarland & Company, Inc. p. 149. ISBN 0-7864-1785-4.
