= Seabury Quinn =

American lawyer, journalist, and author

- Seabury Quinn, date unknown
- Born: January 1, 1889; Washington, D.C., U.S.
- Died: December 24, 1969 (aged 80)
- Other name: Jerome Burke

Seabury Grandin Quinn (also known as Jerome Burke; January 1, 1889 – December 24, 1969) was an American government lawyer, journalist, and pulp magazine author, most famous for his stories of the occult detective Jules de Grandin, published in Weird Tales.

== Biography ==
Seabury Quinn was born January 1, 1889, in Washington, D.C. In 1910 Quinn graduated from the law school of the National University and was admitted to the District of Columbia Bar.

Quinn served in the Army in World War I. After his service he became editor of a group of trade papers in New York, where he taught medical jurisprudence and wrote technical articles and pulp magazine fiction.

His first published work was "The Law of the Movies", in The Motion Picture Magazine, December 1917. (His story "Painted Gold" may have been written earlier.) "Demons of the Night" was published in Detective Story Magazine on March 19, 1918, followed by "Was She Mad?" on March 25, 1918. He published "The Stone Image" in 1919. He introduced Jules de Grandin as a character in 1925 (taking the character's surname from his own middle name), and continued writing stories about him until 1951. The longest of the de Grandin stories is the 1932 novel-length story The Devil's Bride, strongly influenced by Robert W. Chambers' 1920 novel The Slayer of Souls.

In 1937 he returned to Washington to represent a chain of trade journals, and there subsequently became a government lawyer for the duration of World War II. He alternated between law and journalism all his life. He published over five hundred short stories.

His first book, Roads (a new origin for Santa Claus, drawn from the original Christian legends), was published by Arkham House in 1948.

Ten of the Jules de Grandin stories were collected in The Phantom Fighter (Mycroft & Moran, an imprint of Arkham House), 1966. A broader selection of the stories, including the novel The Devil's Bride, was issued in a six-volume Popular Library paperback edition in 1967–77. A three-volume omnibus reportedly including all the de Grandin stories was issued by Battered Silicon Dispatch Box in 2001.

Although the De Grandin stories were enormously popular on their initial publication, modern critics tend to regard them as the weakest part of Quinn's work, with Brian Stableford describing the De Grandin stories "as indeed rather undistinguished", claiming they are full of stereotyped characters and poorly resolved plots. Quinn wrote several non-De Grandin tales in the 1940s and 1950s; Stableford states Quinn's "best stories here are ironically perverted love stories", such as "The Globe of Memories" (1937) and "Glamour" (1939).

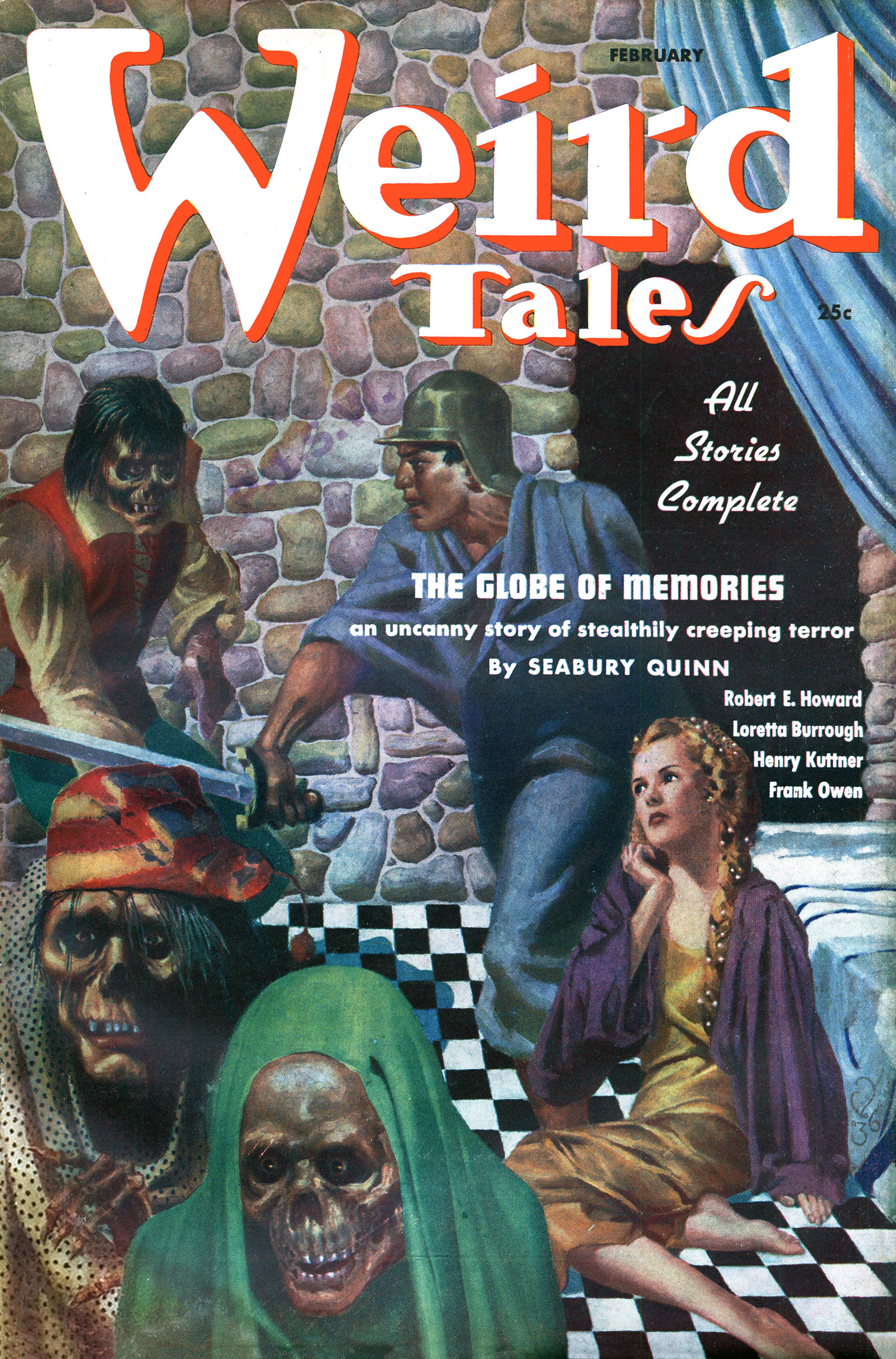
Brian Stableford wrote that Seabury Quinn's best stories were his "ironically perverted love stories", such as "The Globe of Memories" (1937).

His writing was secondary to his career as a lawyer specializing in mortuary jurisprudence. He taught this subject at mortuary schools for many years, and for some 15 years was the editor of Casket & Sunnyside, a leading trade journal. His Jerome Burke stories are still published in the Dodge embalming magazine.

Of his professional work, only two books were published. The first was A Syllabus of Mortuary Jurisprudence, published in book form in 1933 by Clement Williams of Kansas City, Kansas, with a foreword by C. A. Renouard (of the Renouard School of Embalming) and Clement Williams (of the Clement Williams School of Embalming). This was distilled from a lecture he gave in 1914. The text was extant as early as 1924/1925, being serialized in Casket and Sunnyside. Quinn became editor of Casket and Sunnyside in December 1925.

The second was An Encyclopedic Law Glossary For Funeral Directors and Embalmers, published by the Williams Institute of Mortuary Science, Kansas City 1940, with an introduction by Quinn, dated January 1940. This had a series of definitions of terms that had puzzled his students.

Besides contributing to the then De-Ce-Co Magazine, later the Dodge Magazine, for the Dodge Chemical Co, of Cambridge, Massachusetts, Quinn wrote articles for The American Funeral Director and other trade journals. His Jerome Burke material, not necessarily in sequence, is available in This I Remember: Memoirs of a Funeral Director, published by the Battered Silicon Dispatch Box, with a foreword by Arnold Dodge.

Quinn was a contemporary of Robert E. Howard, H. P. Lovecraft, and Clark Ashton Smith. Mary Elizabeth Counselman was a friend of Quinn's and wrote a tribute to him after he died.

Quinn's posthumously published novel Alien Flesh (1977) is a sexually explicit erotic fantasy about a male Egyptologist who has a magical sex change into a beautiful young woman. It has been described as a "bold and striking celebration of sexual confusion" in the style of Pierre Louÿs. It was illustrated by Stephen Fabian.

On July 4, 1926, Quinn and his first wife Mary Helen Molster Quinn, had one child. Their son, Seabury Quinn Jr., received drama degrees from Harvard, Columbia, and Yale Universities and served as professor of theater at Ohio University close to thirty years, endowing the Seabury Quinn Jr. Playwrights Festival in Athens, Ohio.

== Later publications ==
Night Creatures, a collection of stories by Quinn, edited by Peter Ruber and Joseph Wrzos for Ash-Tree Press appeared in (2003).

Demons of the Night, another collection of his stories, was published by Black Dog Books, of Normal, Illinois. Edited by Gene Christie, it contains his early stories. It has two of the "Major Sturdevant and his Washington Nights' Entertainment series", subtitled "Stories of the Secret Service", and two more featuring Professor Forrester, another amateur detector of crimes. It also contains one of the most complete bibliographies of Quinn yet published.

Someday I'll Kill You!, was published by Black Dog Books, of Normal, Illinois. Edited by Gene Christie, it contains all of Quinn's non-series stories published outside of Weird Tales between 1925 and 1963.

All of the Jules deGrandin stories were reprinted in 5 hardcover volumes in 2018 & 2019 by Night Shade Books.

A facsimile of the 1948 Arkham House edition of "Roads" was published 2017 by Shadowridge Press.
