= Carnacki, the Ghost-Finder =

1913 collection of short stories by William Hope Hodgson

Carnacki the Ghost-Finder
- Dust-jacket for Carnacki the Ghost-Finder (1947), illustrated by Frank Utpatel
- Author: William Hope Hodgson
- Illustrator: Florence Briscoe (1910 serial)
- Series: Carnacki
- Genre: Supernatural fiction, detective fiction
- Publisher: Eveleigh Nash (1913), Mycroft & Moran (1947)
- Publication date: 1913, expanded 1947
- Publication place: United Kingdom
- Media type: Print (hardcover)
- Pages: 288, 241
- OCLC: 13117415

Carnacki the Ghost-Finder is a collection of occult detective short stories by English writer William Hope Hodgson, featuring the titular protagonist. It was first published in 1913 by the English publisher Eveleigh Nash. In 1947, a new edition of 3,050 copies was published by Mycroft & Moran and included three additional stories (the last three listed below). In 1951 Ellery Queen covered the Mycroft & Moran version as No. 53 in Queen's Quorum: A History of the Detective-Crime Short Story As Revealed by the 100 Most Important Books Published in this Field Since 1845.

For several decades subsequent to the Mycroft and Moran edition, Carnacki collections routinely if not always contained all nine stories. Project Gutenberg Ebook #10832 (2004) contains only the first six stories, however, and arranges them in sequence of their 1910 and 1912 magazine publication. Some other publications follow Project Gutenberg, perhaps using its text.

== Contents ==
Carnacki the Ghost-Finder contains the following tales:

- "The Gateway of the Monster". First published as ‘Carnacki the Ghost-Finder No. 1. The Idler, January 1910, Vol. 36, Iss. 88
- "The House Among the Laurels". First published as ‘Carnacki the Ghost-Finder No. 2. The Idler, February 1910, Vol. 36, Iss. 89
- "The Whistling Room". First published as ‘Carnacki the Ghost-Finder No. 3. The Idler, March 1910, Vol. 36, Iss. 90
- "The Horse of the Invisible". First published as ‘Carnacki the Ghost-Finder No. 4. The Idler, April 1910, Vol. 36, Iss. 91
- "The Searcher of the End House". First published as ‘Carnacki the Ghost-Finder No. 5. The Idler, June 1910, Vol. 36, Iss. 93
- "The Thing Invisible"
- "The Hog"
- "The Haunted Jarvee"
- "The Find"
