= Battered Silicon Dispatch Box =

The Battered Silicon Dispatch Box (BSDB) is a Canadian independent literary publisher, founded in 1993 by George A. Vanderburgh. Based in Shelburne, Ontario, and also in Sauk City, Wisconsin, United States. The company is headed by George Vanderburgh.

The press initially specialized in the writings about Sherlock Holmes and Sir Arthur Conan Doyle, with the motto "The Sherlockian publisher of first and last resort." Since then the imprint has focused on detective fiction from the Golden Age, as well as pulp fiction serial characters from the 20th century in the series "The Lost Treasures from the Pulps". The press also specializes in new and otherwise out-of-print books by Canadian authors. BSDB has issued books under several logos, including The Other Door, Artemesia House, Mycroft & Moran, Hawk and Whippoorwill and The August Derleth Society.

The BSDB published over 425 titles in its first decade and a half. New titles are added regularly. The press is governed by an editorial board known as "The Sacred Six", whose membership consists of Robert Weinberg, Illinois; Garyn Roberts, Michigan; Randy Vanderbeek, Michigan; Rodney Schroeter, Wisconsin; John Robert Colombo, Toronto; and George Vanderburgh, Shelburne, Ontario.

Their book I Have an Idea for a Book... The Bibliography of Martin H. Greenberg was nominated for the 2013 Hugo Award for Best Related Work.
