= Mr. Fairlie's Final Journey =

1968 detective fiction novel by August Derleth

- Dust-jacket illustration by Frank Utpatel.
- Author: August Derleth
- Cover artist: Frank Utpatel
- Language: English
- Series: Solar Pons
- Genre: Detective fiction
- Publisher: Mycroft & Moran
- Publication date: 1968
- Publication place: United States
- Media type: Print (hardback)
- Pages: 131
- Preceded by: The Casebook of Solar Pons
- Followed by: The Chronicles of Solar Pons

Mr. Fairlie's Final Journey is a detective fiction novel by American writer August Derleth. It was released in 1968 by Mycroft & Moran in an edition of 3,493 copies. The novel is part of Derleth's Solar Pons stories which are pastiches of the Sherlock Holmes tales of Arthur Conan Doyle. It was the eighth Solar Pons book published by Mycroft & Moran.

== Plot summary ==
The book concerns the investigation into the death of Jonas Fairlie, who was murdered on a train while on his way to consult Solar Pons. To solve the mystery, Pons and his companion, Dr. Lyndon Parker, travel to Fairlie's home town of Frome, Somerset and from there to Scotland, Cheltenham in Gloucestershire, and finally to a remote area on the coast of Wales.
