= Peter Ruber =

American book publisher

- Born: September 29, 1940; Vienna, Austria
- Died: March 6, 2014 (aged 73); Long Island, New York, U.S.
- Occupations: author, editor, publisher

Peter Ruber (September 29, 1940 – March 6, 2014) was a United States author, editor and publisher. He had been an advertising executive, book publisher and, since the mid-1990s, a consultant and free-lance journalist for many leading business information technology magazines. He lived on Long Island, New York with his wife, three sons, three grandchildren and a mountain of books and literary papers.

As a publishing executive, he came to know Arkham House founder August Derleth. Between 1962 and 1971 he published many books by Derleth, some under his Candlelight Press imprint, and researched his former colleague's life and time for nearly forty years.

Ruber became the editor for Arkham House in 1997, after Jim Turner left to found Golden Gryphon Press. Ruber drew criticism for the hostile opinions of various authors he expressed in his story introductions within his anthology Arkham's Masters of Horror (2000).

Ruber authored The Last Bookman: A Journey into the Life and Times of Vincent Starrett: Journalist, Bookman, Bibliophile (NY: Candlelight Press, 1968; reprint Battered Silicon Dispatch Box, 1995) and was the editor of over 25 books. He did much research for a biography on August Derleth (as yet unpublished) and Seabury Quinn. He also began editing for Battered Silicon Dispatch Box all of Vincent Starrett's works, with 22 of a projected 25 volumes already in print.

In 2000 Ruber edited a collection of previously unpublished stories by H. Russell Wakefield for Ash-Tree Press. For the same publisher, in 2003, he edited Night Creatures by Seabury Quinn.

Rumours of his ill-health circulated for some time; he suffered a stroke in 2004 and his editorial duties at Arkham House lapsed due to this.

Ruber died on March 6, 2014.
