= August Derleth =

American writer (1909–1971)

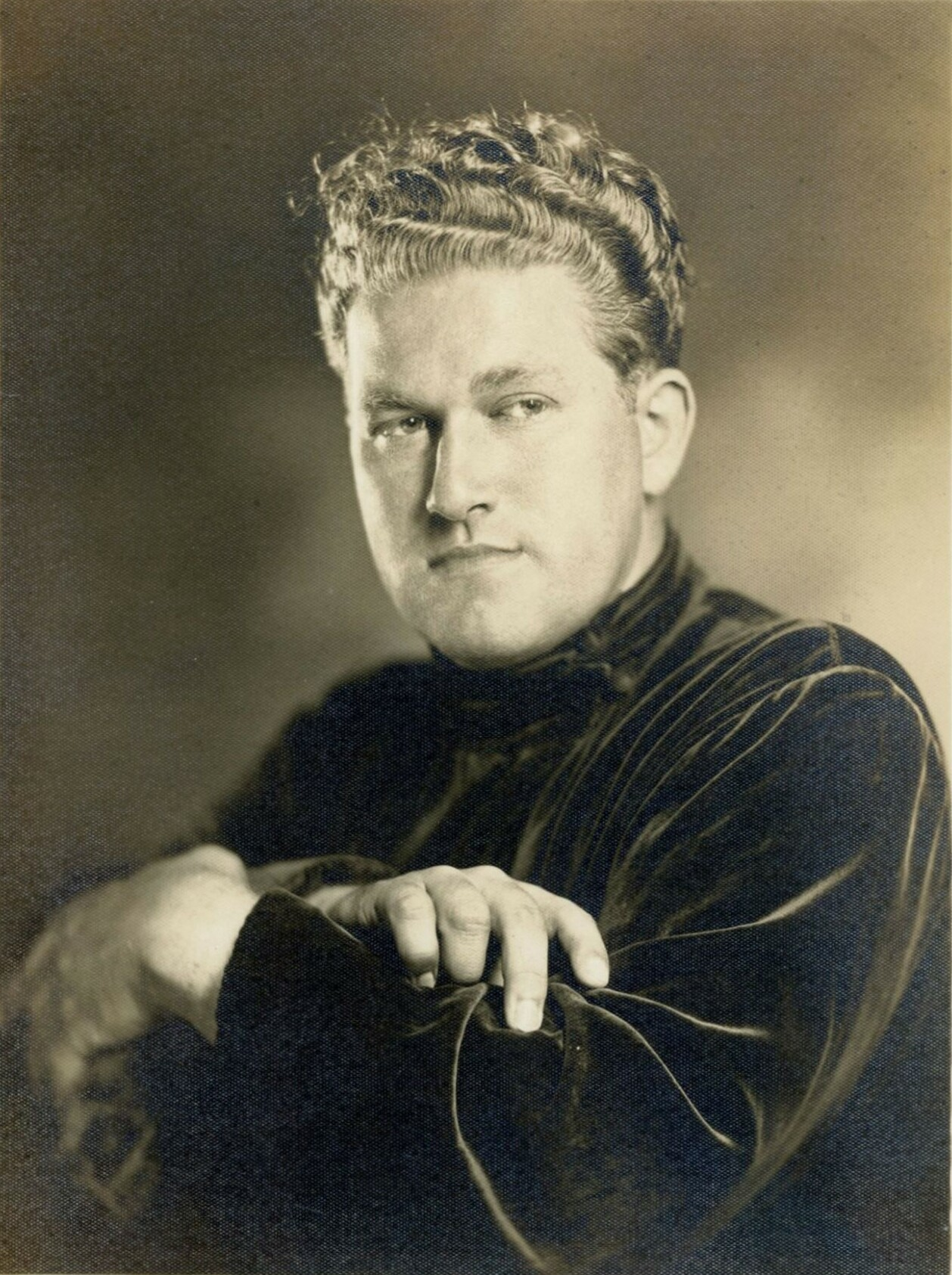
- Derleth in 1939
- Born: August William Derleth; February 24, 1909; Sauk City, Wisconsin, US
- Died: July 4, 1971 (aged 62); Sauk City, Wisconsin, US
- Occupations: Novelist, short story writer
- Spouse: Sandra Winters (m. 1953; div. 1959)
- Children: 2
- Writing career
- Pen name: Stephen Grendon
- Genres: Fantasy, Horror, Mystery, Regional, Science fiction
- Movement: Weird Fiction

August William Derleth (February 24, 1909 – July 4, 1971) was an American writer and anthologist. He was the first book publisher of the writings of H. P. Lovecraft. He made contributions to the Cthulhu Mythos and the cosmic horror genre and helped found Arkham House, a publishing company which did much to introduce hardcover prints of United Kingdom supernatural fiction works to the United States. Derleth was also a leading American regional writer of his day, as well as prolific in several other genres, including historical fiction, poetry, detective fiction, science fiction, and biography. He created the fictional detective Solar Pons, a pastiche of Arthur Conan Doyle's Sherlock Holmes.

A 1938 Guggenheim Fellow, Derleth considered his most serious work to be the ambitious Sac Prairie Saga, a series of fiction, historical fiction, poetry, and non-fiction naturalist works designed to memorialize life in the Wisconsin he knew. Derleth can also be considered a pioneering naturalist and conservationist in his writing.

== Life ==
The son of William Julius Derleth and Rose Louise Volk, who were of French-Bavarian and Prussian-Pennsylvania Dutch ancestry, Derleth grew up in Sauk City, Wisconsin. He was educated in local parochial and public high school. Derleth wrote his first fiction at age 13. He was interested most in reading, and he made three trips to the library a week. He would save his money to buy books (his personal library exceeded 12,000 volumes later on in life). Some of his biggest influences were Ralph Waldo Emerson's essays, Walt Whitman, H. L. Mencken's The American Mercury, Samuel Johnson's The History of Rasselas, Prince of Abissinia, Alexandre Dumas, Edgar Allan Poe, Walter Scott, and Henry David Thoreau's Walden.

Forty rejected stories and three years later, according to anthologist Jim Stephens, he sold his first story, "Bat's Belfry", to Weird Tales magazine in 1926. Derleth wrote throughout his four years at the University of Wisconsin, where he received a B.A. in 1930. During this time he also served briefly as associate editor of Minneapolis-based Fawcett Publications Mystic Magazine.

Returning to Sauk City in the summer of 1931, Derleth worked in a local canning factory and collaborated with childhood friend Mark Schorer (later Chairman of the University of California, Berkeley English Department). They rented a cabin, writing Gothic and other horror stories and selling them to Weird Tales magazine. Derleth won a place on the O'Brien Roll of Honor for Five Alone, published in Place of Hawks, but was first published in Pagany magazine.

As a result of his early work on the Sac Prairie Saga, Derleth was awarded the prestigious Guggenheim Fellowship; his sponsors were Helen C. White, Nobel Prize-winning novelist Sinclair Lewis and poet Edgar Lee Masters of Spoon River Anthology fame.

In the mid-1930s, Derleth organized a Ranger's Club for young people, served as clerk and president of the local school board, served as a parole officer, organized a local men's club and a parent-teacher association. He also lectured in American regional literature at the University of Wisconsin and was a contributing editor of Outdoors Magazine.

With longtime friend Donald Wandrei, Derleth founded Arkham House in 1939. Its initial objective was to publish the works of H. P. Lovecraft, with whom Derleth had corresponded since his teenage years. At the same time, he began teaching a course in American Regional Literature at the University of Wisconsin.

In 1941, he became literary editor of The Capital Times newspaper in Madison, a post he held until his resignation in 1960. His hobbies included fencing, swimming, chess, philately and comic-strips (Derleth reportedly used the funding from his Guggenheim Fellowship to bind his comic book collection, most recently valued in the millions of dollars, rather than to travel abroad as the award intended.). Derleth's true avocation, however, was hiking the terrain of his native Wisconsin lands, and observing and recording nature with an expert eye.

Derleth once wrote of his writing methods, "I write very swiftly, from 750,000 to a million words yearly, very little of it pulp material."

In 1948, he was elected president of the Associated Fantasy Publishers at the 6th World Science Fiction Convention in Toronto.

He was married April 6, 1953, to Sandra Evelyn Winters. They divorced six years later. Derleth retained custody of the couple's two children, April Rose and Walden William. April earned a Bachelor of Arts degree in English from the University of Wisconsin-Madison in 1977. She became majority stockholder, President, and CEO of Arkham House in 1994. She remained in that capacity until her death. She was known in the community as a naturalist and humanitarian. April died on March 21, 2011.

In 1960, Derleth began editing and publishing a magazine called Hawk and Whippoorwill, dedicated to poems of man and nature.

Derleth died of a heart attack on July 4, 1971, and is buried in St. Aloysius Cemetery in Sauk City. The U.S. 12 bridge over the Wisconsin River is named in his honor. Derleth was Roman Catholic.

In Derleth's biography, Dorothy M. Grobe Litersky stated that Derleth was bisexual, and maintained long-term romantic relationships with both men and women. This assertion has not been verified; no names were given of these romantic partners (in the interest of privacy according to Litersky), and no evidence or acknowledgement of Derleth having a bisexual or homosexual orientation has ever been found in his personal correspondence.

== Career ==
Derleth wrote more than 150 short stories and more than 100 books during his lifetime.

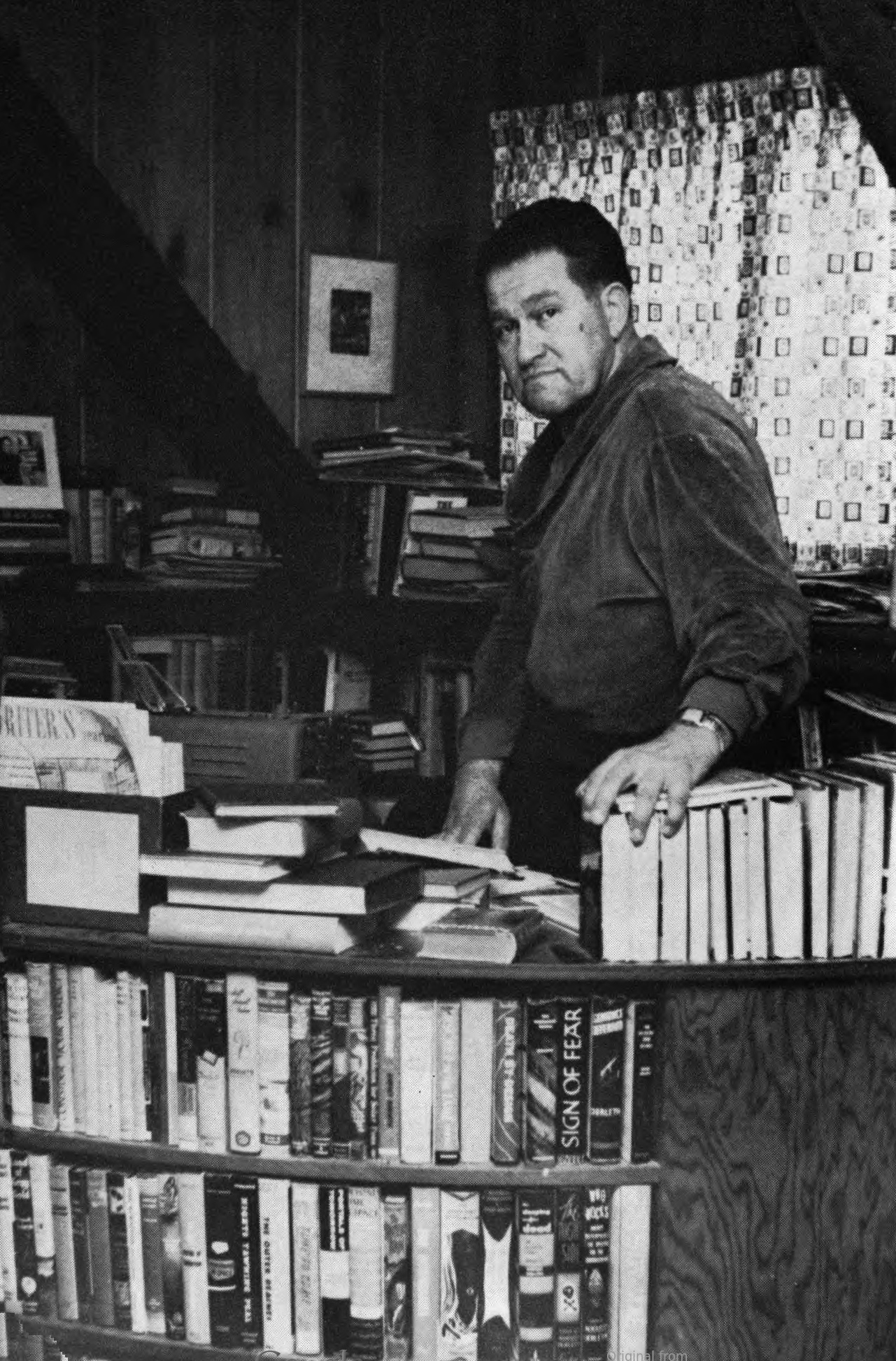
Derleth in 1962

=== The Sac Prairie Saga ===
Derleth wrote an expansive series of novels, short stories, journals, poems, and other works about Sac Prairie. Derleth intended this series to comprise up to 50 novels telling the projected life-story of the region from the 19th century onwards, with analogies to Balzac's Human Comedy and Proust's Remembrance of Things Past.

This, and other early work by Derleth, made him a well-known figure among the regional literary figures of his time: early Pulitzer Prize winners Hamlin Garland and Zona Gale, as well as Sinclair Lewis, the last both an admirer and critic of Derleth.

As Edward Wagenknecht wrote in Cavalcade of the American Novel, "What Mr. Derleth has that is lacking… in modern novelists generally, is a country. He belongs. He writes of a land and a people that are bone of his bone and flesh of his flesh. In his fictional world, there is a unity much deeper and more fundamental than anything that can be conferred by an ideology. It is clear, too, that he did not get the best, and most fictionally useful, part of his background material from research in the library; like Scott, in his Border novels, he gives, rather, the impression of having drunk it in with his mother's milk."

Jim Stephens, editor of An August Derleth Reader, (1992), argues: "what Derleth accomplished… was to gather a Wisconsin mythos which gave respect to the ancient fundament of our contemporary life."

The author inaugurated the Sac Prairie Saga with four novellas comprising Place of Hawks, published by Loring & Mussey in 1935. At publication, The Detroit News wrote: "Certainly with this book Mr. Derleth may be added to the American writers of distinction."

Derleth's first novel, Still is the Summer Night, was published two years later by the famous Charles Scribners' editor Maxwell Perkins, and was the second in his Sac Prairie Saga.

Village Year, the first in a series of journals – meditations on nature, Midwestern village American life, and more – was published in 1941 to praise from The New York Times Book Review: "A book of instant sensitive responsiveness… recreates its scene with acuteness and beauty, and makes an unusual contribution to the Americana of the present day." The New York Herald Tribune observed that "Derleth… deepens the value of his village setting by presenting in full the enduring natural background; with the people projected against this, the writing comes to have the quality of an old Flemish picture, humanity lively and amusing and loveable in the foreground and nature magnificent beyond." James Grey, writing in the St. Louis Dispatch concluded, "Derleth has achieved a kind of prose equivalent of the Spoon River Anthology."

In the same year, Evening in Spring was published by Charles Scribners & Sons. This work Derleth considered among his finest. What The Milwaukee Journal called "this beautiful little love story", is an autobiographical novel of first love beset by small-town religious bigotry. The work received critical praise: The New Yorker considered it a story told "with tenderness and charm", while the Chicago Tribune concluded: "It's as though he turned back the pages of an old diary and told, with rekindled emotion, of the pangs of pain and the sharp, clear sweetness of a boy's first love." Helen Constance White, wrote in The Capital Times that it was "… the best articulated, the most fully disciplined of his stories."

These were followed in 1943 with Shadow of Night, a Scribners' novel of which The Chicago Sun wrote: "Structurally it has the perfection of a carved jewel…. A psychological novel of the first order, and an adventure tale that is unique and inspiriting."

In November 1945, however, Derleth's work was attacked by his one-time admirer and mentor, Sinclair Lewis. Writing in Esquire, Lewis observed, "It is a proof of Mr. Derleth's merit that he makes one want to make the journey and see his particular Avalon: The Wisconsin River shining among its islands, and the castles of Baron Pierneau and Hercules Dousman. He is a champion and a justification of regionalism. Yet he is also a burly, bounding, bustling, self-confident, opinionated, and highly-sweatered young man with faults so grievous that a melancholy perusal of them may be of more value to apprentices than a study of his serious virtues. If he could ever be persuaded that he isn't half as good as he thinks he is, if he would learn the art of sitting still and using a blue pencil, he might become twice as good as he thinks he is – which would about rank him with Homer." Derleth good-humoredly reprinted the criticism along with a photograph of himself sans sweater, on the back cover of his 1948 country journal: Village Daybook.

A lighter side to the Sac Prairie Saga is a series of quasi-autobiographical short stories known as the "Gus Elker Stories", amusing tales of country life that Peter Ruber, Derleth's last editor, said were "… models of construction and… fused with some of the most memorable characters in American literature." Most were written between 1934 and the late 1940s, though the last, "Tail of the Dog", was published in 1959 and won the Scholastic Magazine short story award for the year. The series was collected and republished in Country Matters in 1996.

Walden West, published in 1961, is considered by many Derleth's finest work. This prose meditation is built out of the same fundamental material as the series of Sac Prairie journals, but is organized around three themes: "the persistence of memory… the sounds and odors of the country… and Thoreau's observation that the 'mass of men lead lives of quiet desperation.'" A blend of nature writing, philosophic musings, and careful observation of the people and place of "Sac Prairie". Of this work, George Vukelich, author of "North Country Notebook", writes: "Derleth's Walden West is… the equal of Sherwood Anderson's Winesburg, Ohio, Thornton Wilder's Our Town, and Edgar Lee Masters' Spoon River Anthology." This was followed eight years later by Return to Walden West, a work of similar quality, but with a more noticeable environmentalist edge to the writing, notes critic Norbert Blei.

A close literary relative of the Sac Prairie Saga was Derleth's Wisconsin Saga, which comprises several historical novels.

=== Detective fiction and "Solar Pons" ===
Detective fiction represented another substantial body of Derleth's work. Most notable among this work was a series of 70 stories in affectionate pastiche of Sherlock Holmes, whose creator, Sir Arthur Conan Doyle, he admired greatly. The stories feature a Holmes-styled British detective named Solar Pons, of 7B Praed Street in London. These included one published novel as well (Mr. Fairlie's Final Journey). The series was greatly admired by such notable writers and critics of mystery and detective fiction as Ellery Queen (Frederic Dannay), Anthony Boucher, Vincent Starrett, and Howard Haycraft.

In his 1944 volume The Misadventures of Sherlock Holmes, Ellery Queen wrote of Derleth's "The Norcross Riddle", an early Pons story: "How many budding authors, not even old enough to vote, could have captured the spirit and atmosphere with as much fidelity?" Queen adds, "his choice of the euphonic Solar Pons is an appealing addition to the fascinating lore of Sherlockian nomenclature." Vincent Starrett, in his foreword to the 1964 edition of The Casebook of Solar Pons, wrote that the series is "as sparkling a galaxy of Sherlockian pastiches as we have had since the canonical entertainments came to an end."

Despite close similarities to Doyle's creation, Pons lived in the post-World War I era, in the decades of the 1920s and 1930s. Though Derleth never wrote a Pons novel to equal The Hound of the Baskervilles, editor Peter Ruber wrote that "Derleth produced more than a few Solar Pons stories almost as good as Sir Arthur's, and many that had better plot construction."

Although these stories were a form of diversion for Derleth, Ruber, who edited The Original Text Solar Pons Omnibus Edition (2000), argued: "Because the stories were generally of such high quality, they ought to be assessed on their own merits as a unique contribution in the annals of mystery fiction, rather than suffering comparison as one of the endless imitators of Sherlock Holmes."

Some of the stories were self-published, through a new imprint called "Mycroft & Moran", an appellation of humorous significance to Holmesian scholars. For approximately a decade, an active supporting group was the Praed Street Irregulars, patterned after the Baker Street Irregulars.

In 1946, Conan Doyle's two sons made some attempts to force Derleth to cease publishing the Solar Pons series, but the efforts were unsuccessful, and were eventually withdrawn.

Derleth's mystery and detective fiction also included a series of works set in Sac Prairie and featuring Judge Peck as the central character.

=== Youth and children's fiction ===
Derleth wrote many and varied children's works, including biographies meant to introduce younger readers to explorer Jacques Marquette, as well as Ralph Waldo Emerson and Henry David Thoreau. Arguably most important among his works for younger readers, however, is the Steve and Sim Mystery Series, also known as the Mill Creek Irregulars series. The ten-volume series, published between 1958 and 1970, is set in Sac Prairie of the 1920s and can thus be considered in its own right a part of the Sac Prairie Saga, as well as an extension of Derleth's body of mystery fiction. Robert Hood, writing in the New York Times said: "Steve and Sim, the major characters, are twentieth-century cousins of Huck Finn and Tom Sawyer; Derleth's minor characters, little gems of comic drawing." The first novel in the series, The Moon Tenders, does, in fact, involve a rafting adventure down the Wisconsin River, which led regional writer Jesse Stuart to suggest the novel was one that "older people might read to recapture the spirit and dream of youth." The connection to the Sac Prairie Saga was noted by the Chicago Tribune: "Once again a small midwest community in 1920s is depicted with perception, skill, and dry humor."

=== Arkham House and the "Cthulhu Mythos" ===
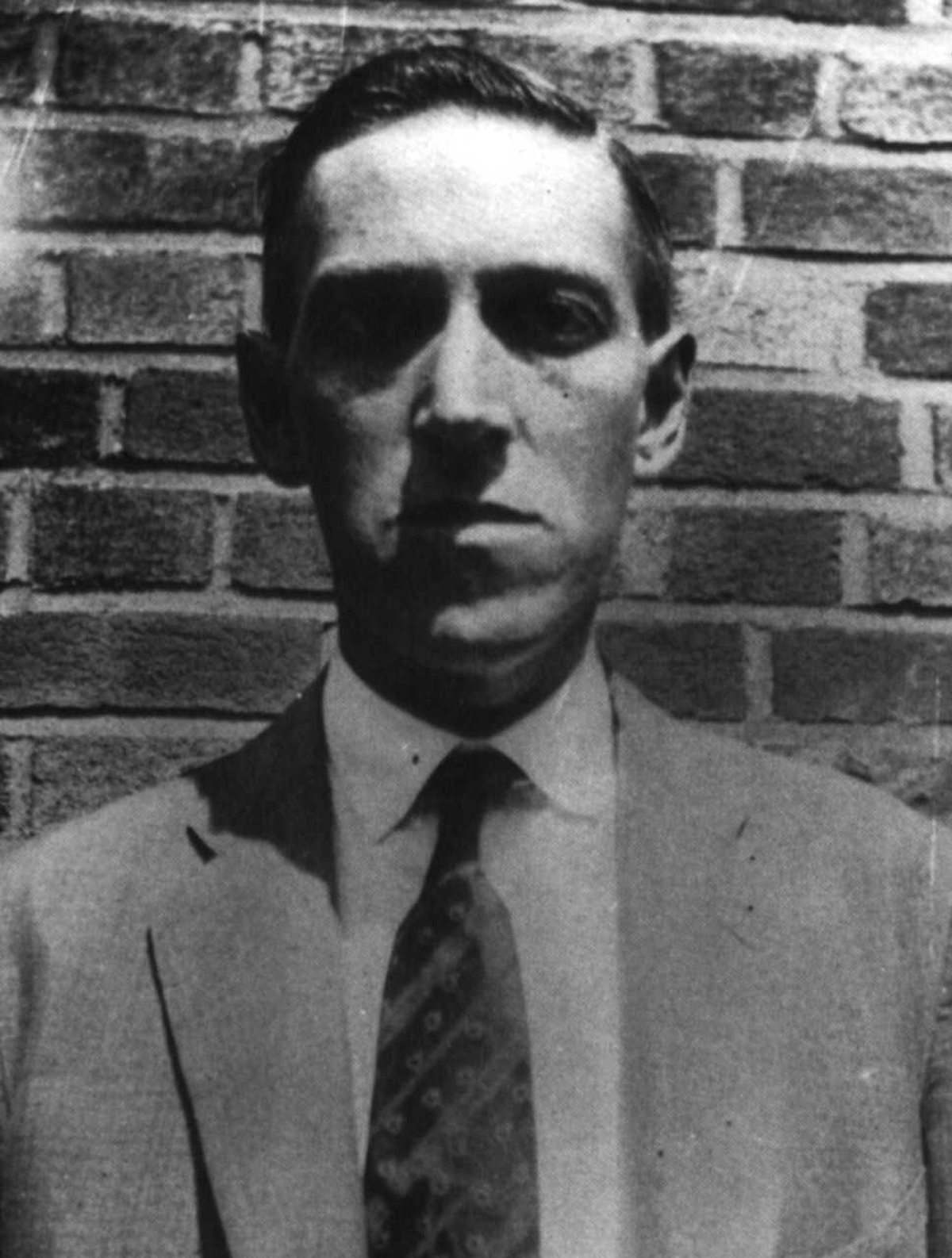
H. P. Lovecraft on July 11, 1931

Derleth was a correspondent and friend of H. P. Lovecraft – when Lovecraft wrote about "le Comte d'Erlette" in his fiction, it was in homage to Derleth. Derleth invented the term "Cthulhu Mythos" to describe the fictional universe depicted in the series of stories shared by Lovecraft and other writers in his circle.

When Lovecraft died in 1937, Derleth and Donald Wandrei assembled a collection of Lovecraft's stories and tried to get them published. Existing publishers showed little interest, so Derleth and Wandrei founded Arkham House in 1939 for that purpose. The name of the company derived from Lovecraft's fictional town of Arkham, Massachusetts, which features in many of his stories. In 1939, Arkham House published The Outsider and Others, a huge collection that contained most of Lovecraft's known short stories. Derleth and Wandrei soon expanded Arkham House and began a regular publishing schedule after its second book, Someone in the Dark, a collection of some of Derleth's own horror stories, was published in 1941.

Following Lovecraft's death, Derleth wrote a number of stories based on fragments and notes left by Lovecraft. These were published in Weird Tales and later in book form, under the byline "H. P. Lovecraft and August Derleth", with Derleth calling himself a "posthumous collaborator". This practice has raised objections in some quarters that Derleth simply used Lovecraft's name to market what was essentially his own fiction; S. T. Joshi refers to the "posthumous collaborations" as marking the beginning of "perhaps the most disreputable phase of Derleth's activities".

Dirk W. Mosig, S. T. Joshi, and Richard L. Tierney were dissatisfied with Derleth's invention of the term Cthulhu Mythos (Lovecraft himself used Yog-Sothothery) and his presentation of Lovecraft's fiction as having an overall pattern reflecting Derleth's own Christian world view, which they contrast with Lovecraft's depiction of an amoral universe. However, Robert M. Price points out that while Derleth's tales are distinct from Lovecraft's in their use of hope and his depiction of a struggle between good and evil, nevertheless the basis of Derleth's systemization are found in Lovecraft. He also suggests that the differences can be overstated:

Derleth was more optimistic than Lovecraft in his conception of the Mythos, but we are dealing with a difference more of degree than kind. There are indeed tales wherein Derleth's protagonists get off scot-free (like "The Shadow in the Attic", "Witches' Hollow", or "The Shuttered Room"), but often the hero is doomed (e.g., "The House in the Valley", "The Peabody Heritage", "Something in Wood"), as in Lovecraft. And it must be remembered that an occasional Lovecraftian hero does manage to overcome the odds, e.g., in "The Horror in the Museum", "The Shunned House", and "The Case of Charles Dexter Ward".

Derleth also treated Lovecraft's Great Old Ones as representatives of elemental forces, creating new fictional entities to flesh out this framework.

Such debates aside, Derleth's founding of Arkham House and his successful effort to rescue Lovecraft from literary oblivion are widely acknowledged by practitioners in the horror field as seminal events in the field. For instance, Ramsey Campbell has acknowledged Derleth's encouragement and guidance during the early part of his own writing career, and Kirby McCauley has cited Derleth and Arkham House as an inspiration for his own anthology Dark Forces. Arkham House and Derleth published Dark Carnival, the first book by Ray Bradbury, as well. Brian Lumley cites the importance of Derleth to his own Lovecraftian work, and contends in a 2009 introduction to Derleth's work that he was "… one of the first, finest, and most discerning editors and publishers of macabre fiction".

Important as was Derleth's work to rescue H.P. Lovecraft from literary obscurity at the time of Lovecraft's death, Derleth also built a body of horror and spectral fiction of his own; still frequently anthologized. The best of this work, recently reprinted in four volumes of short stories – most of which were originally published in Weird Tales, illustrates Derleth's original abilities in the genre. While Derleth considered his work in this genre less important than his most serious literary efforts, the compilers of these four anthologies, including Ramsey Campbell, note that the stories still resonate after more than 50 years.

In 2009, The Library of America selected Derleth's story The Panelled Room for inclusion in its two-century retrospective of American Fantastic Tales.

=== Other works ===
Derleth also wrote many historical novels, as part of both the Sac Prairie Saga and the Wisconsin Saga. He also wrote history; arguably most notable among these was The Wisconsin: River of a Thousand Isles, published in 1942. The work was one in a series entitled "The Rivers of America", conceived by writer Constance Lindsay Skinner during the Great Depression as a series that would connect Americans to their heritage through the history of the great rivers of the nation. Skinner wanted the series to be written by artists, not academicians. Derleth, while not a trained historian, was, according to former Wisconsin state historian William F. Thompson, "… a very competent regional historian who based his historical writing upon research in the primary documents and who regularly sought the help of professionals…". In the foreword to the 1985 reissue of the work by The University of Wisconsin Press, Thompson concluded: "No other writer, of whatever background or training, knew and understood his particular 'corner of the earth' better than August Derleth."

Additionally, Derleth wrote a number of volumes of poetry. Three of his collections – Rind of Earth (1942), Selected Poems (1944), and The Edge of Night (1945) – were published by the Decker Press, which also printed the work of other Midwestern poets such as Edgar Lee Masters.

Derleth was also the author of several biographies of other writers, including Zona Gale, Ralph Waldo Emerson and Henry David Thoreau.

He also wrote introductions to several collections of classic early 20th century comics, such as Buster Brown, Little Nemo in Slumberland, and Katzenjammer Kids, as well as a book of children's poetry entitled A Boy's Way, and the foreword to Tales from an Indian Lodge by Phebe Jewell Nichols. Derleth also wrote under the pen names Stephen Grendon, Kenyon Holmes and Tally Mason.

Derleth's papers were donated to the Wisconsin Historical Society in Madison.

== Awards ==
- O'Brien Roll of Honour for short story, 1933
- Guggenheim fellow, 1938

== See also ==
- August Derleth Award
- List of authors of new Sherlock Holmes stories
- List of horror fiction authors
- List of people from Wisconsin
- Mark Schorer
- Sherlock Holmes pastiches
