= The Eye and the Finger =

1944 collection of short stories by Donald Wandrei

- Dust-jacket illustration by Howard Wandrei.
- Author: Donald Wandrei
- Cover artist: Howard Wandrei
- Language: English
- Genre: Fantasy, horror, science fiction
- Publisher: Arkham House
- Publication date: 1944
- Publication place: United States
- Media type: Print (hardback)
- Pages: xiii, 344

The Eye and the Finger is a collection of fantasy, horror and science fiction short stories by American writer Donald Wandrei. It was released in 1944 and was his first book published by Arkham House. 1,617 copies were printed.

The 21 stories here collected had appeared previously in Weird Tales, Esquire, Argosy, Astounding Stories and other magazines. They were selected by the author and were the ones he considered to be his best at the time. The dust jacket illustration is by the author's brother, Howard Wandrei.

Don Herron quotes bookseller/publisher Roy A. Squires as saying that The Eye and the Finger is "one of the most difficult to find of Arkham House fiction titles - it was out of print in 1946." The collection has never been reprinted in its original form, although all the stories are included in the Fedogan & Bremer omnibus collections Don't Dream: The Collected Fantasy and Horror of Donald Wandrei and Colossus: The Collected Science Fiction of Donald Wandrei.

Chapter XII of The Web of Easter Island is a somewhat rewritten version of the story "A Fragment of a Dream".

== Contents ==
The Eye and the Finger contains the following short stories:

- "Introduction" (by the author)
- "The Lady in Gray"
- "The Eye and the Finger"
- "The Painted Mirror"
- "It Will Grow on You"
- "The Tree-Men of M'Bwa"
- "The Lives of Alfred Kramer"
- "The Monster from Nowhere"
- "The Witch-Makers"
- "The Neverless Man"
- "Black Fog"
- "The Blinding Shadows"
- "The Scientist Divides"
- "Earth Minus"
- "Finality Unlimited"
- "The Crystal Bullet"
- "A Fragment of a Dream"
- "The Woman at the Window"
- "The Messengers"
- "The Pursuers"
- "The Red Brain"
- "On the Threshold of Eternity"

== Reception ==
The New York Times reviewer Marjorie Farber gave the collection a mixed review, saying "If the sole function of a horror story is to horrify, this volume can be safely recommended to all addicts of clear conscience and strong stomach", but that [w]hile conceding genuine effectiveness to most of Mr. Wandrei's scientific and supernatural horrors, . . . I still feel that the effect he produces is sometimes too direct" -- "effective at the time, but not lasting".
