= Arcana (convention) =

Horror convention held in Minnesota, US

- Status: Active
- Genre: Dark fantasy
- Venue: Best Western Hotel, Bandana Square
- Locations: St. Paul, Minnesota
- Country: United States
- Inaugurated: 1971
- Attendance: 70+
- Organizer: Minn-Con
- Website: http://arcanacon.com

Arcana is a long-running horror convention that bills itself as "a convention of the dark fantastic." Arcana is held annually in late September or early October in St. Paul, Minnesota and typically features a famous author or artist from the dark fantasy genre as its guest of honor. Arcana programming includes a variety of panels, talks, and films, plus an interview and reading with the guest of honor. Other programming includes a book and art auction and an "open" reading. The presentation of the Minnesota Fantasy Award is a key feature of each year's convention.

== History ==
Arcana began in 1971, when two fans of Howard Phillips Lovecraft, Clark Ashton Smith, Robert E. Howard and other writers of the pulp era discovered each other and began meeting regularly. John J. Koblas and Eric Carlson soon found others with similar interests, and the gatherings became known as MinnCon. By 1988, the group numbered in the dozens. The possibility of featuring professional guests by charging an admission fee was broached. Confusion with the Minneapolis SF convention Minicon made it desirable to adopt a different name. Thus, Arcana.

== Minnesota Fantasy Award ==
The Minnesota Fantasy Award is presented annually to a person or persons with ties to Minnesota in recognition of their contributions to the fields of fantasy, science fiction and horror. To be eligible, a nominee must be a Minnesotan by virtue of one of the following: birth; having been a resident of the state for at least five years; or having been a resident of the state for at least one year during which the nominee made a significant contribution to the fields of fantasy, science fiction or horror. The trophy was designed by artist Mike Odden, based on his metal sculpture "Spectre".

The first recipients of the award were author Carl Jacobi, writer/poet Donald Wandrei, writer/editor Howard Wandrei, and author Clifford Simak in 1988. Other recipients have included authors, scholars, editors, directors, and poets. Winners from 1988 to the present are listed below with the convention at which the award was announced.

Though the award has usually been presented annually, it appears no award was made in the years 2001-2003 inclusive, nor in 2005.

== Location ==
The first conventions were held in members' homes but after a few years MinnCon grew beyond the capacity of these houses and the event moved to a local hotel. Several hotels have been used over the years, including the Sunwood Inn in St. Paul, but the convention's home for many years has been the Holiday Inn at Bandana Square located at 1010 Bandana Boulevard W, Saint Paul, Minnesota, 55108-5107. The hotel changed corporate flags in 2007 and operated as a Best Western franchise. It permanently closed after 2019.

Arcana has been held in different locations post-hotel closure.

== Past conventions ==
MinnCon 17 was held October 8–10, 1987. Programming included a slide show/talk by Jon Arfstrom, a discussion of copyright law by David Page, several panels, two film screenings, a slide show/talk by Robert Guttke about his artwork, and an improvisatory performance by Paul Dice, Ed Shannon, Mike Odden and Rodger Gerberding.

Arcana 18 was held October 7–9, 1988. This was the first convention after the name change from "MinnCon" to "Arcana" but consistent numbering was maintained. The guests of honor were Robert Weinberg and Don Herron. Programming included talks by the guests of honor, a slide show/talk by Rodger Gerberding, several panels, an open reading, and three hours of gaming. The first Minnesota Fantasy Awards were given to author Carl Jacobi, writer/poet Donald Wandrei, writer/editor Howard Wandrei, and author Clifford Simak.

Arcana 19 was held October 6–8, 1989. The guest of honor was Charles DeVet. Programming included panels, readings, an interview with Charles DeVet, open reading, a session of "Call of Cthulhu" gaming, and a Saturday night performance of "Gotterdamerung". The convention also featured several slide show/talks including "Carnivorous Plants: Fact and Fiction" by Michaela Waltz, "A Sherlock Holmes Tour" by R. Dixon Smith, and "The Art of Mike Odden" by Mike Odden. The 1989 Minnesota Fantasy Award was presented to author Gordon R. Dickson.

Arcana 20 was held October 5–7, 1990. The guest of honor was Richard Lupoff. Programming included an interview with the guest of honor, two slide show/talk presentations by Rodger Gerberding, several panels, an open reading, several film screenings, and a session of "Call of Cthulhu" gaming. The 1990 Minnesota Fantasy Award was presented to writer Poul Anderson.

Arcana 21 was held October 4–6, 1991. The guest of honor was Harry O. Morris. Programming included panels, readings, an interview with Harry O. Morris, an auction, open reading, and screenings of the 1984 Brothers Quay animated short Street of Crocodiles and the 1964 movie Kwaidan. Notable slide show/talk presentations included "Clarence Laughlin: Visionary Photographer" by Rodger Gerberding and "Twenty Years of MinnCon" by Eric Carlson. Also featured was the Artists Intermedia Repertory Ensemble, an improvisatory performance by Paul Dice, Ed Shannon, Mike Odden and Rodger Gerberding. The 1991 Minnesota Fantasy Award was presented to Charles DeVet.

Arcana 22 was held October 9–11, 1992, at the Sunwood Inn in St. Paul, Minnesota. The guest of honor was writer Robert Bloch. Programming included panels, readings, an interview with Robert Bloch, an auction, open reading, and a tribute to author Fritz Leiber. (Leiber was scheduled to have been another GoH before his death.) There was a parallel programming track featuring the film and television work of Robert Bloch. A notable addition to the convention was a "Cthulhu in '92" Presidential Rally. The 1992 Minnesota Fantasy Award was presented to writer John Sladek.

Arcana 23 was held October 10–12, 1993. The guest of honor was Dennis Etchison. Programming included panels, readings, an interview with Dennis Etchison, an auction, open reading, and screenings of the 1942 movie The Seventh Victim and the 1963 movie The Haunting. The convention also featured several slide show/talks including "Songs and Dances of Death: Modest Mussorgsky" by John Brower, "Carnivorous Plants: Fact and Fiction" by Michaela Waltz, "The Art or Something-Or-Other of Harry E. Fassl" by Harry E. Fassl, "Return to Derleth" by James P. Roberts, and "Mystical Places of the United Kingdom" by Lisa Freitag. The 1993 Minnesota Fantasy Award was presented to writer and scholar Richard Tierney.

Arcana 24 was held September 30-October 2, 1994. The guests of honor were authors Melanie Tem and Steve Rasnic Tem. Programming included panels, readings, an interview with Melanie and Steve Rasnic Tem, a slide show/talk by Michaela Waltz, an auction, an open reading, and a memorial for actors Vincent Price and Peter Cushing. The convention also included Friday night screenings of the Tod Browning films Freaks (1932) and The Devil Doll (1936). The 1994 Minnesota Fantasy Award was presented to author Eleanor Arnason.

Arcana 25 was held September 22–24, 1995, at the Holiday Inn Bandana Square. The guest of honor was Chelsea Quinn Yarbro. Programming included panels, readings, an interview with Chelsea Quinn Yarbro, a slide show/talk by Eric Carlson "Crimson in Silver: 25 Years of MinnCon," an auction, an open reading, and a memorial for Robert Bloch and Karl Edward Wagner. The convention also included screenings of the James Whale films Frankenstein (1931), The Invisible Man (1933), and Bride of Frankenstein (1935). The 1995 Minnesota Fantasy Award was presented to artist Jon Arfstrom.

Arcana 26 was held October 4–6, 1996, at the Holiday Inn Express Bandana Square. The guests of honor were David J. Skal, Richard A. Lupoff, and publishers Fedogan & Bremer. Programming included panels, readings, several Rod Serling themed programming items, interviews with David Skal, Fedogan & Bremer, and Richard Lupoff, plus an auction, open reading, and screenings of the Tod Browning films Dracula (1931) and The Unknown (1927). A notable addition to the convention was a "Cthulhu in '96" Presidential Rally. The 1996 Minnesota Fantasy Award was presented to Kirby McCauley.

Arcana 27 was held September 26–28, 1997, at the Holiday Inn Express Bandana Square. The guest of honor was Neil Gaiman. Programming included panels, readings, an interview with Neil Gaiman, a slide show/talk by Michaela Waltz, an auction, an open reading, and a memorial for Carl Jacobi. The convention also included screenings of the 1932 film The Mummy, the 1940 film The Mummy's Hand, and the 1959 film The Mummy. The 1997 Minnesota Fantasy Award was presented to actor/director Terry Gilliam.

Arcana 28 was held September 25–27, 1998, at the Holiday Inn Express Bandana Square. The guest of honor was Joe R. Lansdale. The 1998 Minnesota Fantasy Award was given posthumously to illustrator and writer of fantasy fiction Hannes Bok.

Arcana 29 was held October 22–24, 1999, at the Holiday Inn Express Bandana Square. The guest of honor was writer Ramsey Campbell. The 1999 Minnesota Fantasy Award was given to both publisher Philip J. Rahman of Fedogan and Bremer and to author Gertrude Barrows Bennett, the first major female writer of fantasy and science fiction in the United States. A notable feature of the convention was a poll of the membership for the "top ten" horror authors and movies of the 20th century. Convention organizers admit the poll was "a bit premature" but that nonetheless "it's a pretty good list of good stuff for horror fans to savor".

Arcana 30 was held September 15–17, 2000, at the Holiday Inn Express Bandana Square. The guest of honor was David Drake, author of horror and science fiction in many forms, editor of numerous anthologies, and one-third owner of the award-winning publisher Carcosa.

Arcana 31 was held September 28–30, 2001, at the Holiday Inn Express Bandana Square. The guests of honor were Eleanor Arnason and writer/editor Robert M. Price. Price edited the Lovecraftian magazine "Crypt of Cthulhu" for many years. His essays on Lovecraftian themes and his horror fiction have appeared in many magazines.

Arcana 32 was held September 27–29, 2002, at the Holiday Inn Express Bandana Square. The guest of honor was drive-in movie critic Joe Bob Briggs (aka writer and actor John Bloom).

Arcana 33 was held September 26–28, 2003, at the Holiday Inn Express Bandana Square. The guest of honor was cartoonist Gahan Wilson.

Arcana 34 was held October 1–3, 2004, at the Holiday Inn Express Bandana Square. The guest of honor was Tim Powers. The chair of the convention was Eric M. Heideman. The 2004 Minnesota Fantasy Award was presented to writer and active fan Ruth Berman.

Arcana 35 was held October 7–9, 2005, at the Holiday Inn Express Bandana Square. The guest of honor was Stephen Jones. Programming included panels, an interview with Stephen Jones, readings, and an auction.The auction raised more than $1100 towards convention expenses. The chair of the convention was Eric M. Heideman.

Arcana 36 was held September 29-October 1, 2006, at the Holiday Inn Express Bandana Square. The guest of honor was Tor books editor David G. Hartwell. The 2006 Minnesota Fantasy Award was presented to artist team Steve Fastner and Rich Larson.

Arcana 37 was held October 12–14, 2007, at the Best Western Hotel Bandana Square in St. Paul, Minnesota. (This is the same hotel as in recent years operating under a new corporate flag.) The guest of honor was writer George Clayton Johnson, best known for his work on The Twilight Zone, Star Trek, Ocean's 11, Kung Fu, Logan's Run, and his 1998 story collection "All of Us Are Dying." The 2007 Minnesota Fantasy Award was presented to David Lenander.

Arcana 38 was held October 17–19, 2008, at the Best Western Hotel Bandana Square in St. Paul, Minnesota. The guest of honor was writer F. Paul Wilson, Award-winning, best-selling author of horror, thrillers, fantasy & more... including the Repairman Jack series. The 2008 Minnesota Fantasy Award was presented to P.C. Hodgell. The posthumous award was awarded to Wilford Fawcett (aka Captain Billy), 1885-1940.

Arcana 39 was held October 16–18, 2009, at the Best Western Hotel Bandana Square in St. Paul, Minnesota. The scheduled Guest of Honor was writer Kim Harrison, best-selling author of The Hollows series featuring Rachel Morgan including For a Few Demons More & The Outlaw Demon Wails. "

Arcana 40 was held October 15–17, 2010, at the Best Western Hotel Bandana Square in St. Paul, Minnesota. The guest of honor was author P.C. Hodgell. The 2010 Minnesota Fantasy Award was awarded to Norman Saunders.

Arcana 41 was held October 21–23, 2011, at the Best Western Hotel Bandana Square in St. Paul, Minnesota. The 2011 Minnesota Fantasy Award was awarded to F. Scott Fitzgerald.

Arcana 42 was held October 19–21, 2012, at the Best Western Hotel Bandana Square in St. Paul, Minnesota. The guest of honor was S.T. Joshi. The 2012 Minnesota Fantasy Award was awarded to writer John J. Koblas.

Arcana 43 was held October 18–20, 2013, at the Best Western Hotel Bandana Square in St. Paul, Minnesota. The guest of honor was artist Tim Kirk. The 2013 Minnesota Fantasy Award was awarded to Emma Bull and Will Shetterly.

Arcana 44 was held October 17–19, 2014, at the Best Western Hotel Bandana Square in St. Paul, Minnesota. The guest of honor will be the artist Anthony Tollin, known for his work on pulps such as The Shadow and Doc Savage, and is currently running the publisher Sanctum Books. The 2014 Minnesota Fantasy Award was awarded to Steven Brust.

Arcana 45 was held October 23–25, 2015, at the Best Western Hotel Bandana Square in St. Paul, Minnesota. The Author Guest of Honor was Benjamin Percy. The Editor Guest of Honor was Catherine Lundoff, award-winning author and editor. The Minnesota Fantasy Award for lifetime achievement goes to a person who has lived a significant amount of time in Minnesota and has made a significant contribution to the field of the fantastic. This year the award was accepted by Greg Ketter on behalf of artist John Berkey (1932-2008).

Arcana 46 was held October 21–23, 2016, at the Best Western Hotel Bandana Square in St. Paul, Minnesota. The guest of honor was Kathe Koja. The Minnesota Fantasy Award went to Allen Anderson (1908-1995) who worked as a staff artist at Fawcett Publications in Minneapolis from 1929-1939, and went on to paint covers for pulp magazines.

Arcana 47 was held September 29 to October 1, 2017, at the Best Western Hotel Bandana Square in St. Paul, Minnesota. The guests of honor were:

- Guest Editor: William F. Nolan
- Guest Editor: Roy C. Booth
- Guest Playwright: Cynthia Booth
- Special Guests: Jason V . Brock & Sunni Brock

Arcana 49 was held Sept 27-29, 2019 at DeCONgestant 4, at the Bloomington Hilton.

Arcana 50 was held October 7–9, 2022 at Decongestant 5, after a 2-year delay due to the COVID pandemic.
