= Wandrei =

Wandrei is a surname. Notable people with the surname include:

- Donald Wandrei (1908–1987), American writer, poet, and editor
- Howard Wandrei (1909–1956), American writer
