= Three Tales =

Three Tales may refer to:

- Three Tales (film), the first Japanese anime ever broadcast
- Three Tales (Flaubert), a short story collection by Gustave Flaubert
- Three Tales (opera), an opera by Steve Reich and Beryl Korot
- Three Tales (Wandrei), a short story collection by Howard Wandrei
