= P. C. Hodgell =

American novelist & academic (born 1951)

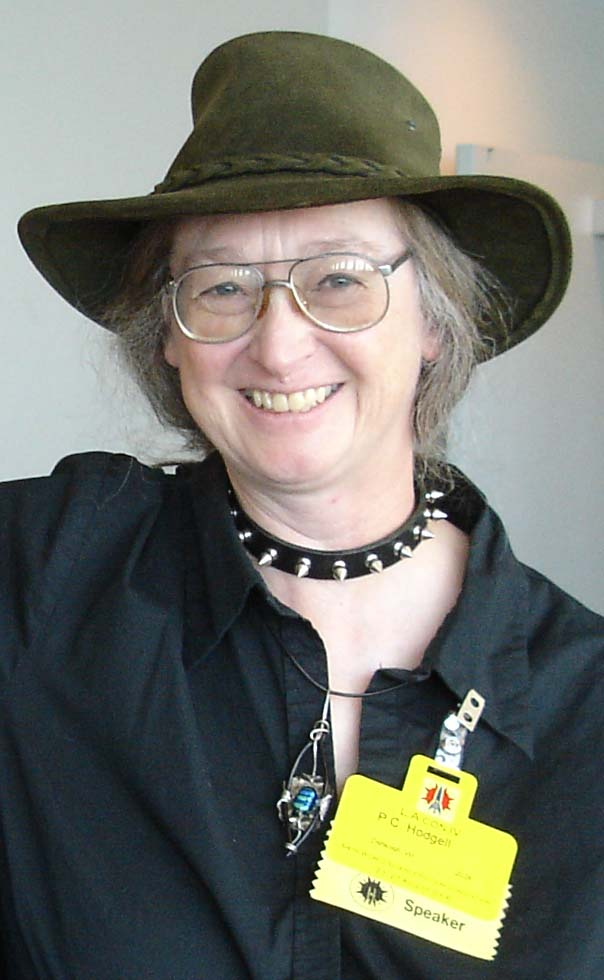
- Hodgell at Worldcon 2006 (aka L.A.con IV)
- Born: Patricia Christine Hodgell; March 16, 1951 (age 75); Des Moines, Iowa, U.S.
- Education: University of Minnesota (PhD)
- Occupations: Novelist; short story writer; teacher
- Writing career
- Genres: fantasy, horror, science fiction, genre fiction, dark fantasy
- Website: www.pchodgell.com

Patricia "Pat" Christine Hodgell (born March 16, 1951) is an American fantasy writer and former academic. Hodgell taught in the English Department at the University of Wisconsin–Oshkosh until her retirement in 2006 to pursue a full-time writing career. She has won several awards for her works.

== Academic career ==
Hodgell holds a master's in English literature and a doctorate in 19th-century English literature, both earned at the University of Minnesota. She completed her Ph.D. and subsequent dissertation on Sir Walter Scott's Ivanhoe between the publication of her first two fantasy novels, God Stalk and Dark of the Moon. She is a graduate of the Clarion and the Milford Writer's Workshops. In academia, Hodgell produced an audio-cassette-based course on science fiction and fantasy for the University of Minnesota. She taught for many years in the English Department at University of Wisconsin–Oshkosh, but retired in 2006 to pursue a full-time writing career. While at the University of Wisconsin, P. C. Hodgell divided her time between teaching and writing, with a strong emphasis on "anything that stirs the imagination". This included attending science fiction conventions, and hobbies such as collecting yarn, knitting, embroidering, and raising cats.

== Writing ==
Over the years, P. C. Hodgell has been published by several publishing houses. Two of her more recent publishers, Hypatia Press and Meisha Merlin, went out of business, the latter in 2007, temporarily leaving her without a venue for future works. Her work was picked up by Baen in or shortly before 2010, which published the fifth "Jame" novel, Bound in Blood, and reissued the previous four books as a pair of omnibus editions, The God Stalker Chronicles and Seeker's Bane.

== Bibliography ==
=== The Kencyrath Novels ===
==== Novels ====
1. God Stalk, 1982 (ISBN 978-0425060797)
2. Dark of the Moon, 1985 (ISBN 978-0689311710)
3. Seeker's Mask, 1994 (ISBN 978-0739418871)
4. To Ride a Rathorn, August 2006 (ISBN 978-1592221028)
5. Bound in Blood, March 2010 (ISBN 978-1439133408)
6. Honor's Paradox, December 2011 (ISBN 978-1451637625)
7. The Sea of Time, June 2014 (ISBN 978-1476736495)
8. The Gates of Tagmeth, August 2017 (ISBN 978-1481482547)
9. By Demons Possessed, May 2019 (ISBN 978-1481483988)
10. Deathless Gods, October 2022 (ISBN 978-1982192167)

==== Omnibuses ====
- Chronicles of the Kencyrath, 1987: contains God Stalk and Dark of the Moon (ISBN 978-0450424007)
- Dark of the Gods, 2000: contains God Stalk,Dark of the Moon and related short story "Bones" (ISBN 978-1892065261)
- Godstalker Chronicles, 2006: containingGod Stalk, Dark of the Moon, Seeker's Mask, To Ride a Rathorn, and the short story collection Blood and Ivory: A Tapestry in Baen ebook formats.
- The God Stalker Chronicles, 2009: contains God Stalk and Dark of the Moon (ISBN 143913295X)
- Seeker's Bane, TBP July 7, 2009 from Baen: contains Seeker's Mask and To Ride a Rathorn (ISBN 1439132976)

==== Short story collection ====
- Blood and Ivory: A Tapestry, 2002: contains some new stories, some previously released (hardcover: ISBN 978-1-892065-73-5, paperback: ISBN 978-1-892065-72-8)
  - "Hearts of Woven Shadow"
  - "Lost Knots"
  - "Among the Dead"
  - "Child of Darkness" (Hodgell's first-ever story, set in an alternate universe when Jame and the Kencyrath arrive in a world—somewhat like ours—following a holocaust)
  - "A Matter of Honor" (the story which provided the genesis for God Stalk)
  - "Bones"
  - "Stranger Blood" (Hodgell's second story about Jame)
  - "A Ballad of the White Plague" (a Sherlock Holmes story)

=== Other short stories ===
- "The Talisman's Trinket" (2011; posted on Baen's web site)
- "Songs of Waste and Wood" (2014; tie-in with The Sea of Time posted on Baen's web site)

== Awards and honors ==
- 1987: Ph.D. in English Literature, University of Minnesota
- Minnesota Fantasy Award
  - 2008: P. C. Hodgell
- Mythopoeic Fantasy Awards
  - 1983: Finalist—God Stalk by P. C. Hodgell
  - 1986: Finalist—Dark of the Moon by P. C. Hodgell
- Locus Award
  - 1981: "Child of Darkness", Nominee for Best Short Story
  - 1983: God Stalk, Nominee for Best First Novel
  - 1986: Dark of the Moon, Nominee for Best Fantasy Novel
- Guest of Honor at Arcana 40 in 2010, a dark fantasy convention held in St. Paul, Minnesota
- Special Guest at Minicon 21 (1986), 24 (1989), and 25 (1990)
- Author Guest of Honor at Capricon 10 (1990)
