= Poems for Midnight =

Collection of poems by Donald Wandrei

- Jacket illustration by Frank Utpatel for Poems for Midnight
- Author: Donald Wandrei
- Illustrator: Howard Wandrei
- Cover artist: Frank Utpatel
- Language: English
- Genre: Poetry
- Publisher: Arkham House
- Publication date: 1964
- Publication place: United States
- Media type: Print (Hardback)
- Pages: 68 pp

Poems for Midnight is an illustrated collection of 61 poems by Donald Wandrei. It was released in 1964 by Arkham House in an edition of 742 copies. The collection also contains four pen and ink drawings by the author's brother, Howard Wandrei. Some of the early poems were revised radically for their appearance in Poems for Midnight.

== Contents ==
Poems for Midnight contains the following poems:

1. "Song of Autumn"
2. "Song of Oblivion"
3. "Lost Atlantis"
4. "Phantom"
5. "The Corpse Speaks"
6. "The Woman at the Window"
7. "Shadowy Night"
8. "The Worm-King"
9. "Water Spirits"
10. "Incubus"
11. "The Prehistoric Huntsman"
12. "Witches' Sabbath"
13. "Forest Shapes"
14. "The Dream that Dies"
15. "The Sleeper"
16. "The Moon-Glen Altar"
17. "Under the Grass"
18. "The Whispering Knoll"
19. "On Some Drawings"
20. "The Plague Ship"
21. "The Voyagers Return to Tyre"
22. "The Morning of a Nymph in Mandrikor"
23. "The Woodland Pool"
24. "Death and the Traveler"
25. "In Memoriam: George Sterling"
26. "Red"
27. "Kind of the Shadowland"
28. "Borealis"
29. "In Memoriam: No Name"
30. "Ishmael"
31. "Dark Odyssey"
32. "Look Homeward, Angel"
33. "The Challenger"
34. Sonnets for the Midnight Hours
  - "After Sleep"
  - "Purple"
  - "The Old Companions"
  - "The Head"
  - "In the Attic"
  - "The Cocoon"
  - "The Metal God"
  - "The Little Creature"
  - "The Pool"
  - "The Prey"
  - "The Torturers"
  - "The Statues"
  - "The Hungry Flowers"
  - "The Eye"
  - "The Rack"
  - "Escape"
  - "Capture"
  - "In the Pit"
  - "The Unknown Color"
  - "Monstrous Form"
  - "Nightmare in Green"
  - "What Followed Me?"
  - "Fantastic Sculpture"
  - "The Tree"
  - "The Bell"
  - "The Ultimate Vision"
35. "Somewhere Past Ispahan"
