= Strange Harvest (book) =

1965 novel by Donald Wandrei

- Dust-jacket illustration by Howard Wandrei and design by Frank Utpatel.
- Author: Donald Wandrei
- Cover artist: Howard Wandrei and Frank Utpatel
- Language: English
- Genre: Fantasy, Horror, Science fiction
- Publisher: Arkham House
- Publication date: 1965
- Publication place: United States
- Media type: Print (hardback)
- Pages: 289

Strange Harvest is a collection of 17 stories by American writer Donald Wandrei. It was released in 1965 and was the author's fourth book published by Arkham House. It was released in an edition of 2,000 copies. Many of the (primarily science fiction) stories originally appeared in the magazines Weird Tales and Astounding Stories.

== Contents ==
Strange Harvest contains the following tales:

- "Spawn of the Sea"
- "Something from Above"
- "The Green Flame"
- "Strange Harvest"
- "The Chuckler"
- "The Whisperers"
- "The Destroying Horde"
- "Uneasy Lie the Drowned"
- "Life Current"
- "The Fire Vampires"
- "An Atom-Smasher"
- "Murray's light"
- "The Men Who Never Lived"
- "Infinity Zero"
- "A Trip to Infinity"
- "Giant-Plasm"
- "Nightmare"

== Sources ==
- Jaffery, Sheldon (1989). The Arkham House Companion. Mercer Island, WA: Starmont House, Inc. p. 81. ISBN 1-55742-005-X.
- Chalker, Jack L.; Mark Owings (1998). The Science-Fantasy Publishers: A Bibliographic History, 1923-1998. Westminster, MD and Baltimore: Mirage Press, Ltd. p. 43.
- Joshi, S.T. (1999). Sixty Years of Arkham House: A History and Bibliography. Sauk City, WI: Arkham House. p. 93. ISBN 0-87054-176-5.
- Nielsen, Leon (2004). Arkham House Books: A Collector's Guide. Jefferson, NC and London: McFarland & Company, Inc. p. 97. ISBN 0-7864-1785-4.
