= Hawks of Outremer =

Hawks of Outremer may refer to:

- Hawks of Outremer (short story), a 1931 short story by Robert E. Howard
- Hawks of Outremer (short story collection), a 1979 collection of short stories by Robert E. Howard
