= Basil Copper =

English writer, journalist and newspaper editor

- Born: 5 February 1924; London, United Kingdom
- Died: 3 April 2013 (aged 89)
- Occupations: novelist, short story writer
- Writing career
- Genres: fantasy, horror, Detective fiction

Basil Frederick Albert Copper (5 February 1924 – 3 April 2013) was an English writer and former journalist and newspaper editor. He became a full-time writer in 1970. In addition to horror and detective fiction, Copper was perhaps best known for his series of Solar Pons stories continuing the character created as a tribute to Sherlock Holmes by August Derleth.

Copper's interests included swimming, gardening, travel, sailing and historic film material. One of England's leading film collectors, his private archive contained over one thousand titles (at 1989). He founded the Tunbridge Wells Vintage Film Society which ran for 20 years showing only films from Copper's collection. He often gave talks at various film organisations in London. He was a member of the British Film Society and the Vintage Film Circle of London. Copper was a longtime resident of Sevenoaks in Kent. His wife was the French-born Annie Copper (née Guerin), to whom he had been married since 1960.

== Career ==
Copper had his very first short story, "The Curse", published when he was 14 years old; however his first professionally published short story was "The Spider" in the Fifth Pan Book of Horror Stories (1964). His first book was the Mike Faraday novel The Dark Mirror (1966).

The first of Copper's stories published by editor August Derleth was "The House by the Tarn" in Dark Things (1971). Copper went on to have a long-lived relationship with Derleth's Arkham House, which published his collections From Evil's Pillow (1973) and And Afterward, the Dark (1977) and his novels Necropolis (1980) and The House of the Wolf. His work drew praise from Donald Wandrei who said of him: "He beguiles the mind as he lures the imagination beyond the outposts of reality." Copper's work was also championed by editor Peter Haining.

Copper's best-known macabre tales include: "The Academy of Pain", "Amber Print", "The Recompensing of Albano Pizar" (dramatised by BBC Radio 4) "The Candle in the Skull' (read over Hallowe'en on BBC Radio 4), "Better Dead", the acclaimed Lovecraftian novella "Beyond the Reef", "Bright Blades Gleaming" and "Ill Met by Daylight".

Copper's novel The Great White Space (1975) describes an expedition into a remote part of Asia to discover the location of the mysterious Old Ones. The Great White Space was influenced by Edgar Allan Poe and Lovecraft and includes elements of the latter author's Cthulhu Mythos stories. The novel also features a character called Clark Ashton Scarsdale who appears to be an affectionate tribute to Clark Ashton Smith.

Copper is also noted for his Cthulhu Mythos short story "Shaft Number 247" in New Tales of the Cthulhu Mythos (1980).

Though his important work was in the domain of the macabre, he also wrote a long-running novel series featuring hard-boiled Los Angeles private detective Mike Faraday (58 novels from 1966 to 1988). Copper had not visited Los Angeles when he wrote the earliest Faraday novels. Instead, he used maps of the city and films based there to supply background detail for the series.

Copper also ghostwrote two novels about the comics hero the Phantom for Lee Falk.

Copper's work has been translated into many languages, reprinted in leading anthologies and filmed for television by Universal Pictures. The TV adaptation was of his well-known macabre story "Camera Obscura", filmed as an episode of Rod Serling's Night Gallery in 1971.

His novels Necropolis (a crossover between a Victorian Gothic and a detective story) and The House of the Wolf (a novel of lycanthropy) were both illustrated by Stephen Fabian. Necropolis received a 1981 nomination for the Locus Award Best Fantasy novel category.

Copper edited a 1982 two-volume omnibus collection of Derleth's stories of the 'Pontine' canon, published by Arkham House; in that edition, Copper "edited" most of the tales in ways that many Solar Pons aficionados found objectionable. A later omnibus, The Original Text Solar Pons Omnibus Edition, was issued in 2000 under the imprint of Mycroft & Moran.

In early 2008, a bio-bibliography was published on him: Basil Copper: A Life in Books, compiled and edited by Stephen Jones. The volume received the 2009 British Fantasy Award for Best Non-Fiction.

In March 2010, Darkness, Mist and Shadow: The Collected Macabre Tales of Basil Copper was launched at the Brighton World Horror Convention as a two-volume set by PS Publishing.

== Works ==
- Not After Nightfall (Four Square Books, 1967)
- From Evil's Pillow (Arkham House, 1973)
- The Vampire: In Legend, Fact and Art (Robert Hale, 1973)
- The Great White Space (Robert Hale, 1974)
- When Footsteps Echo (Robert Hale, 1975)
- The Curse of the Fleers (Harwood-Smart, 1976)
- And Afterward, the Dark (Arkham House, 1977)
- The Werewolf: In Legend, Fact and Art (Robert Hale, 1977)
- Here Be Daemons (Robert Hale, 1978)
- Voices of Doom (Robert Hale, 1980)
- Necropolis (Arkham House, 1980)
- Into the Silence (Sphere Books, 1983)
- The House of the Wolf (Arkham House, 1983)
- The Black Death (Fedogan & Bremer, 1991). Illustrations by Stefanie Kate Hawks.
- Whispers in the Night: Stories of the Mysterious & Macabre (Fedogan & Bremer, 1999)
- Cold Hand on My Shoulder (Sarob Press, 2002). Nine stories, four previously unpublished. Limited ed of 352 copies comprising 300 trade hardcovers and 52 signed lettered copies in slipcase.
- Darkness, Mist and Shadow: The Collected Macabre Tales of Basil Copper Volumes 1, 2, and 3 (PS Publishing, 2010)

=== Solar Pons ===
- The Dossier of Solar Pons (Pinnacle, 1979)
- The Further Adventures of Solar Pons (Pinnacle, 1979)
- The Secret Files of Solar Pons (Pinnacle, 1979)
- The Uncollected Cases of Solar Pons (Pinnacle, 1979)
- The Exploits of Solar Pons (Fedogan & Bremer, 1993)
- The Adventure of the Singular Sandwich (Fedogan & Bremer, 1995)
- The Recollections of Solar Pons (Fedogan & Bremer, 1995)
- Solar Pons Versus The Devil's Claw (Sarob Press, 2004)
- Solar Pons: The Final Cases (Sarob Press, 2005)

=== Mike Faraday ===
1. The Dark Mirror (1966)
2. Night Frost (1966)
3. No Flowers for the General (1967)
4. Scratch on the Dark (1967)
5. Die Now, Live Later (1968)
6. Don't Bleed on Me (1968)
7. The Marble Orchard (1969)
8. Dead File (1970)
9. No Letters from the Grave (1971)
10. The Big Chill (1972)
11. Strong-Arm (1972)
12. A Great Year for Dying (1973)
13. Shock-Wave (1973)
14. The Breaking Point (1973)
15. A Voice from the Dead (1974)
16. Feedback (1974)
17. Ricochet (1974)
18. The High Wall (1975)
19. Impact (1975)
20. A Good Place to Die (1975)
21. The Lonely Place (1976)
22. Crack in the Sidewalk (1976)
23. Tight Corner (1976)
24. The Year of the Dragon (1977)
25. Death Squad (1977)
26. Murder One (1978)
27. A Quiet Room in Hell (1979)
28. The Big Rip-Off (1979)
29. The Caligari Complex (1980)
30. Flip-Side (1980)
31. The Long Rest (1981)
32. The Empty Silence (1981)
33. Dark Entry (1981)
34. Hang Loose (1982)
35. Shoot-Out (1982)
36. The Far Horizon (1982)
37. Trigger-Man (1983)
38. Pressure-Point (1983)
39. Hard Contract (1983)
40. The Narrow Corner (1983)
41. The Hook (1984)
42. You Only Die Once (1984)
43. Tuxedo Park (1985)
44. The Far Side of Fear (1985)
45. Snow-Job (1986)
46. Jet-Lag (1986)
47. Blood on the Moon (1986)
48. Heavy Iron (1987)
49. Turn Down an Empty Glass (1987)
50. Bad Scene (1988)
51. House-Dick (1988)
52. Print-Out (1988)

=== The Phantom ===
- The Slave Market of Mucar (Avon, 1972; as Lee Falk)
- The Scorpia Menace (Avon, 1972; as Lee Falk)

== Honours ==
Copper received many honours over the years. In 1979, the Mark Twain Society of America elected him a Knight of Mark Twain for his outstanding "contribution to modern fiction", while the Praed Street Irregulars twice honoured him for his work on the Solar Pons series. He was a member of the Crime Writers' Association for over thirty years, serving as chairman in 1981/82 and on its committee for a total of seven years. At the 2010 World Horror Convention in Brighton, he was awarded the first WHC Lifetime Achievement Award.

== See also ==
- Copper, Basil (1977). And Afterward, the Dark. Sauk City, WI: Arkham House. ISBN 0-87054-079-3.
- Reginald, Robert (1992). Science Fiction and Fantasy Literature 1975-1991. Detroit: Gale Research. pp. 206. ISBN 0-8103-1825-3.
- Sullivan, Jack (1986). The Penguin Encyclopedia of Horror and the Supernatural. New York: Viking Press. pp. 96. ISBN 0-670-80902-0.
- Tuck, Donald H. (1974). The Encyclopedia of Science Fiction and Fantasy. Chicago: Advent. p. 117. ISBN 0-911682-20-1.
