= From Evil's Pillow =

Basil Copper story collection

- Dust-jacket illustration by Frank Utpatel.
- Author: Basil Copper
- Cover artist: Frank Utpatel
- Language: English
- Genre: Fantasy, Horror
- Publisher: Arkham House
- Publication date: 1973
- Publication place: United States
- Media type: Print (hardback)
- Pages: 177

From Evil's Pillow is a collection of stories by English writer Basil Copper. It was released in 1973 and was the author's first collection of stories published in the United States. It was published by Arkham House in an edition of 3,468 copies.

== Contents ==
From Evil's Pillow contains the following stories:

- "Amber Print"
- "The Grey House"
- "The Gossips"
- "A Very Pleasant Fellow"
- "Charon"

== Sources ==
- Jaffery, Sheldon (1989). The Arkham House Companion. Mercer Island, WA: Starmont House, Inc. p. 106. ISBN 1-55742-005-X.
- Chalker, Jack L.; Mark Owings (1998). The Science-Fantasy Publishers: A Bibliographic History, 1923-1998. Westminster, MD and Baltimore: Mirage Press, Ltd. p. 50.
- Joshi, S.T. (1999). Sixty Years of Arkham House: A History and Bibliography. Sauk City, WI: Arkham House. p. 131. ISBN 0-87054-176-5.
- Nielsen, Leon (2004). Arkham House Books: A Collector's Guide. Jefferson, NC and London: McFarland & Company, Inc. p. 117. ISBN 0-7864-1785-4.
