= The Eerie Mr. Murphy =

- Dust-jacket from the first edition
- Author: Howard Wandrei
- Illustrator: Howard Wandrei
- Cover artist: Howard Wandrei
- Language: English
- Genre: Science fiction, fantasy and horror
- Publisher: Fedogan & Bremer
- Publication date: 2003
- Publication place: United States
- Media type: Print (hardback)
- Pages: ix, 425 pp
- ISBN: 1-878252-44-5
- OCLC: 53113254

The Eerie Mr. Murphy is a collection of science fiction, fantasy and horror stories by author Howard Wandrei. It was released in 2003 by Fedogan & Bremer in an edition of 1,100 copies of which 100 were signed by the editor, D. H. Olson and released in a slipcase with a chapbook of correspondence and diary entries. Many of the stories originally appeared in the magazines Esquire, Weird Tales, Astounding Stories, Spicy Mystery Stories, Speed Mystery, Unknown, Astounding Stories and The Minnesota Quarterly. The book also includes a collection of Wandrei's drawings.

== Contents ==
- Preface, by D. H. Olson
- PART ONE
  - "Published Fiction", by D. H. Olson
  - "The Eerie Mr. Murphy"
  - "Vine Terror" (with H.P. Lovecraft)
  - "Time Haven"
  - "The Molester"
  - "The Persuader"
  - "Old Hokey"
  - "Danger: Quicksand"
  - "The Eyes of the Tiger"
  - "For Murderers Only"
  - "Guns of Maiden Hill"
  - "The African Trick"
  - "In the Dark"
  - "The Mind Marauder"
  - "The Road West"
- PART TWO
  - "Juvenalia & Unpublished Fiction", by D. H. Olson
  - "The Pen"
  - "Effluvia"
  - "Trap of Atlas"
  - "A Shape in the Sky"
  - "The Mind Marauder"
  - "The Step Between"
  - "What Happened to Rudolf"
  - "Hounds in Scarlet"
  - "The Valley of Doubt"
  - "Diamondback"
  - "The Great Imitator"
  - "The Shadow"
  - "Just Lean Back"
  - "Measure of Infinity"
  - "The Sleeper"
- PART THREE
  - Art Gallery
