= Exorcisms and Ecstasies =

1997 collection of short stories by Karl Edward Wagner

- Dust-jacket from the first edition
- Author: Karl Edward Wagner
- Illustrator: Jeffrey K. Potter
- Cover artist: Jeffrey K. Potter
- Language: English
- Genre: fantasy, horror short stories
- Publisher: Fedogan & Bremer
- Publication date: 1997
- Publication place: United States
- Media type: Print (hardback)
- Pages: xviii, 561
- ISBN: 1-878252-28-3
- OCLC: 38425167

Exorcisms and Ecstasies is a collection of fantasy and horror short stories by American writer Karl Edward Wagner. The collection, also including a number of memoirs and articles about Wagner, is edited by Stephen Jones. It was released in 1997 by Fedogan & Bremer in an edition of 2,100 copies, of which 100 included Wagner's signature taken from a canceled check or contract. The limited edition was also signed by the artist, editor and other contributors to the collection. Many of the stories originally appeared in a number of different anthologies and collections or in the magazines Beyond Fantasy & Science Fiction, Kadath, Weird Tales, The Centralite, Midnight Sun, Fantasy Crossroads and Gauntlet.

== Contents ==
- "Introduction: Talking with Karl", by Stephen Jones
- "Midnight Sun"
- Exorcisms and Ecstasies
  - "Various Encounters with Karl" by Peter Straub
  - "Did They Get You to Trade?"
  - "The Kind Men Like"
  - "Cedar Lane"
  - "The Slug"
  - "Final Cut"
  - "Locked Away"
  - "Endless Night"
  - "A Walk on the Wild Side"
  - "Passages"
  - "Little Lessons in Gardening"
  - "I’ve Come to Talk with You Again"
  - "An Awareness of Angels"
  - "But You’ll Never Follow Me"
  - "Plan 10 from Inner Space"
  - "Prince of the Punks"
  - "The Picture of Jonathan Collins"
  - "Gremlin"
  - "Brushed Away"
  - "In the Middle of a Snow Dream"
  - "The Big Dutchman", by Frances Wellman
- Silver Dagger: Kane"
  - "All Good Friends, by David J. Schow
  - "In the Wake of the Night"
  - "The Treasure of Lynortis"
  - "The Gothic Touch"
  - "At First Just Ghostly"
  - "Deep in the Depths of the Acme Warehouse"
  - "Friends Die", by Ramsey Campbell
- Satan’s Gun: Adrian Becker
  - "Doc Wagner", by Jenny Campbell
  - "Satan’s Gun"
  - "Hell Creek"
  - "One Paris Night"
  - "The Truth Insofar as I Know It, by David Drake
- Tell Me, Dark: Uncollected Stories
  - "Brother Karl: Stories First and Last, by James R. Wagner
  - "The Education of Gergy-doo-doo"
  - "Stardust"
  - "Killer"
  - "The Coming of Ghor"
  - "A Fair Cop"
  - "Karl Edward Wagner: Sassenach", by Brian Lumley
  - "Karl Edward Wagner: A Working Bibliography of English Language First Editions", by Scott F. Wyatt & Stephen Jones
  - "Afterword: Karl Edward Wagner—A Personal Farewell", by C. Bruce Hunter
  - "Death Angel’s Shadow"

== Sources ==
- Brown, Charles N.; William G. Contento. "The Locus Index to Science Fiction (1984-1998)".
- Chalker, Jack L.; Mark Owings (1998). The Science-Fantasy Publishers: A Bibliographic History, 1923-1998. Westminster, MD and Baltimore: Mirage Press, Ltd. pp. 256–257.
