= Necropolis (Copper novel) =

1980 novel by Basil Copper

- Dust-jacket illustration by Stephen E. Fabian for Necropolis
- Author: Basil Copper
- Illustrator: Stephen E. Fabian
- Language: English
- Genre: Gothic novel, Mystery novel
- Publisher: Arkham House
- Publication date: 1980
- Publication place: United Kingdom
- Media type: Print (Hardback)
- Pages: xii, 352 pp
- ISBN: 0-87054-088-2
- OCLC: 5353095
- Dewey Decimal: 823/.9/14
- LC Class: PZ4.C7857 Ne 1980 PR6053.O658

Necropolis is a Gothic novel by author Basil Copper. It was published by Arkham House in 1980 in an edition of 4,050 copies. It was Copper's third book published by Arkham House. Reprinted in 1981, it was the first Arkham House book (except works by Lovecraft and August Derleth) to receive a reprint. (Previous publications were limited editions printed once only).

== Plot summary ==
The novel is set in Victorian England. Clyde Beatty, a private investigator, is hired by Angela Meredith to investigate her father's death. His investigations lead him to a nursing home in Surrey, directed by the sinister Dr. Horace Couchman. After an autopsy reveals the murder of Miss Meredith's father, Dr. Couchman flees to London leading Beatty eventually to the eerie Brockwood Cemetery and a criminal conspiracy involving millions of pounds' worth of gold bullion.

== Reprints ==
=== Arkham House ===
- Second Printing, 1981 – 1,539 copies.

=== Valancourt Books ===
- In 2013 Valancourt Books reissued Necropolis with Stephen E. Fabian's illustrations and a new introduction by Stephen Jones.

=== Others ===
- London: Sphere, 1981.
