= Adam Niswander =

American novelist

- Born: February 2, 1946; Flushing, Queens, U.S.
- Died: August 12, 2012 (aged 66); Phoenix, Arizona, U.S.
- Occupations: Novelist, short story writer
- Writing career
- Genres: Horror, fantasy
- Website: www.adam-niswander.com

Adam Niswander (February 2, 1946 – August 12, 2012) was an American short story writer and novelist. He was a president of the Central Arizona Speculative Fiction Society and a member of the Horror Writers Association and the Science Fiction and Fantasy Writers of America. His first novel, The Charm, which is the first book of his Shaman Cycle was published by Integra Press in 1993. He died on August 12, 2012.

== Works ==
=== The Shaman Cycle ===
- The Charm (Integra Press, 1993)
- The Serpent Slayers (Integra Press, 1994)
- The Hound Hunters (Hippocampus Press, 2008)
- The War of the Whisperers (Hippocampus Press, 2009)
- The Nemesis of Night (Hippocampus Press, 2010)

=== Others ===
- The Sand Dwellers (Fedogan & Bremer, 1998)
- The Cost of the Cure (Midnight shambler, 1998)
- The Repository (Meisha Merlin Publishing, 1999)
