= The Web of Easter Island =

1948 novel by Donald Wandrei

- Dust-jacket illustration by Audrey Johnson.
- Author: Donald Wandrei
- Cover artist: Audrey Johnson
- Language: English
- Genre: Fantasy, horror, science fiction
- Publisher: Arkham House
- Publication date: 1948
- Publication place: United States
- Media type: Print (Hardback)
- Pages: 191

The Web of Easter Island is a novel by American writer Donald Wandrei. It was published by Arkham House in 1948 in an edition of 3,068 copies. It was the fourth full-length novel to be published by Arkham House.

The Web of Easter Island was first written in 1932, many years prior to publication under the title Dead Titans, Waken!. The manuscript was rejected by several publishers including Harper & Brothers but was eventually revised and published by Arkham House. It is loosely related to the Cthulhu Mythos (it is dedicated to H. P. Lovecraft) and follows the exploits of Carter E. Graham from England to Easter Island, where ancient horror is discovered and combatted.

Chapter XII of The Web of Easter Island is a somewhat rewritten version of the story A Fragment of a Dream from Wandrei's collection The Eye and the Finger.

Dead Titans, Waken! was edited for re-publication by S.T. Joshi and was to have been issued during the 1990s by Fedogan and Bremer. It was finally published by Centipede Press in a limited edition of 300 copies in March 2012 as an omnibus edition also including another Wandrei novel, Invisible Sun (which remained unpublished during Wandrei's lifetime and appears here for the first time.) . Fedogan and Bremer eventually issued a paperback edition in 2017 which is also an omnibus of the two novels although titled only Dead Titans, Waken! S.T. Joshi's Afterword to these omnibus editions contains considerable information about the genesis of both works.

== Sources ==
- Jaffery, Sheldon (1989). The Arkham House Companion. Mercer Island, WA: Starmont House, Inc. p. 31. ISBN 1-55742-005-X.
- Chalker, Jack L.; Mark Owings (1998). The Science-Fantasy Publishers: A Bibliographic History, 1923-1998. Westminster, MD and Baltimore: Mirage Press, Ltd. p. 31.
- Joshi, S.T. (1999). Sixty Years of Arkham House: A History and Bibliography. Sauk City, WI: Arkham House. p. 48. ISBN 0-87054-176-5.
- Nielsen, Leon (2004). Arkham House Books: A Collector's Guide. Jefferson, NC and London: McFarland & Company, Inc. p. 67. ISBN 0-7864-1785-4.
