= The Black Death (novel) =

1992 novel by Basil Copper

- Dust-jacket from the first edition
- Author: Basil Copper
- Illustrator: Stefanie Hawks
- Cover artist: Stefanie Hawks
- Language: English
- Genre: Gothic, mystery
- Publisher: Fedogan & Bremer
- Publication date: 1992
- Publication place: United States
- Media type: Print (hardback)
- Pages: 373
- ISBN: 1-878252-04-6
- OCLC: 25615406
- Dewey Decimal: 823/.914 20
- LC Class: PR6053.O658 B5 1991

The Black Death is a Gothic novel by English writer Basil Copper. It was originally announced for publication by Arkham House but was ultimately published by Fedogan & Bremer in 1992 in an edition of 1,000 copies of which 100 were numbered and signed by the author and illustrator.

== Plot introduction ==
The novel is set in Victorian England and concerns John Carter, an architect who leaves London to become a junior partner in a prosperous building firm in Thornton Bassett, a village in Dartmoor. His hopes for a new life fade as he discovers a sinister mystery.

== Sources ==
- Brown, Charles N.; William G. Contento. "The Locus Index to Science Fiction (1984-1998)".
- Chalker, Jack L.; Mark Owings (1998). The Science-Fantasy Publishers: A Bibliographic History, 1923-1998. Westminster, MD and Baltimore: Mirage Press, Ltd. p. 252.
