= The House of the Wolf =

1983 novel by Basil Copper

- Dust-jacket illustration by Stephen E. Fabian for The House of the Wolf
- Author: Basil Copper
- Illustrator: Stephen E. Fabian
- Cover artist: Stephen E. Fabian
- Language: English
- Genre: Horror novel, Gothic novel
- Publisher: Arkham House
- Publication date: 1983
- Publication place: United States
- Media type: Print (Hardback)
- Pages: 298 pp
- ISBN: 0-87054-095-5
- OCLC: 9324672
- Dewey Decimal: 823/.914 19
- LC Class: PR6053.O658 H6 1983

The House of the Wolf is a Gothic horror novel by author Basil Copper. It was published by Arkham House in 1983 in an edition of 3,578 copies. It was the author's fourth book published by Arkham House. The book contains a number of interior black and white illustrations by Stephen E. Fabian.

In 2003 Sarob Press 2003 issued a limited edition of The House of the Wolf, limited to 150 copies, with cover art by Randy Broecker and interior illustrations by Stephen Jones.

In 2014 Valancourt Books reissued The House of the Wolf with Fabian's illustrations and a new Afterword by Stephen Jones.

== Plot summary ==
The story, a Victorian thriller, involves Professor John Coleridge, who is a guest at Castle Homolky, situated above the tiny Hungarian village of Lugos. While staying at the castle, a huge black wolf is discovered with preternatural powers.

== Reception ==
It was reviewed favorably by Chris Henderson in the December 1983 issue of Dragon Magazine (#80). Henderson praised Copper for having achieved a difficult task in writing a "new, almost fresh, werewolf story". The characters are "fresh and stimulating" and have "an air of realism". In closing, he noted that: "For that fan of horror stories in your household, this novel is a must.".
