= Colossus (collection) =

- Dust-jacket from the first edition
- Author: Donald Wandrei
- Illustrator: Rodger Gerberding
- Cover artist: Jon Arfstrom
- Language: English
- Genre: Science fiction
- Publisher: Fedogan & Bremer
- Publication date: 1989
- Publication place: United States
- Media type: Print (hardback)
- Pages: xxix, 423
- ISBN: 1-878252-00-3
- OCLC: 20809990
- Dewey Decimal: 813/.52 20
- LC Class: PS3545.A643 A6 1989

Colossus: The Collected Science Fiction of Donald Wandrei is a collection of science fiction short stories by American writer Donald Wandrei. It was released in 1989 by Fedogan & Bremer in an edition of 1,000 copies. Many of the stories originally appeared in the magazines Weird Tales, Astounding Stories, The Minnesota Quarterly, Thrilling Wonder Stories and Leaves.

== Contents ==
=== 1989 edition ===
- Editors’ Note, by Philip J. Rahman
- Introduction, by Richard L. Tierney
- "The Red Brain"
- "The Holiday Act"
- "Something from Above"
- "Raiders of the Universes"
- "A Race Through Time"
- "Farewell to Earth"
- "Colossus"
- "Colossus Eternal"
- "The Atom-Smasher"
- "The Blinding Shadows"
- "Life Current"
- "The Whisperers"
- "Murray’s Light"
- "Earth Minus"
- "Finality Unlimited"
- "Infinity Zero"
- "Black Fog"
- "The Crystal Bullet"
- "On the Threshold of Eternity"
- "A Trip to Infinity"
- "Requiem for Mankind"
- Selected Bibliography, by D. H. Olson

=== stories added for the 1999 edition ===
- "If"
- "A Stranger Passes"

== Publication history ==
Colossus was originally announced as a forthcoming publication by Arkham House as early as 1965. However, it remained unpublished into the 1980s. Phil Rahman and Dr. Dennis Weiler approached the Wandrei estate with the hopes of publishing the collection. While no manuscript nor proposed contents could be found, Rahman and Weiler went forward and published a collection using the same title as the unpublished Arkham House collection. It was the first book published by Fedogan & Bremer.

In 1999, in honor of their 10th anniversary, Fedogan & Bremer issued a second edition of the book (ISBN 1-878252-45-3). The second edition contained an updated introduction, replaced the note by Philip J. Rahman with a newly discovered preface that Wandrei had done for an unpublished collection, and added two stories in place of the bibliography. A gallery of photographs was also added.

== "Farewell to Earth" ==
"Farewell to Earth—The Original Ending"
- Short story by Donald Wandrei
- Country: United States
- Language: English
- Genre: Science fiction

Publication
- Publisher: Fedogan & Bremer
- Media type: Print (paperback)
- Publication date: 1999
- Pages: i, 4

The editor of Astounding Stories did not like the ending for the story "Farewell to Earth" that Donald Wandrei had originally written and Wandrei was forced to change it. Fedogan and Bremer published a chapbook containing the ending of the story as Wandrei originally wrote it. The chapbook also included an introduction by D. H. Olson and was published in an edition of 75 copies. The book was given to those who pre-ordered the 1999 edition of Colossus.

== Sources ==
- Chalker, Jack L.; Mark Owings (1998). The Science-Fantasy Publishers: A Bibliographic History, 1923-1998. Westminster, MD and Baltimore: Mirage Press, Ltd. p. 252.
- Chalker, Jack L.; Mark Owings (2000). The Science-Fantasy Publishers: A Bibliographic History, Supplement 8, 1999–2000. Westminster, MD and Baltimore: Mirage Press, Ltd. p. 21.
- Chalker, Jack L.; Mark Owings (2001). The Science-Fantasy Publishers: A Bibliographic History, Supplement 9, 2000–2001. Westminster, MD and Baltimore: Mirage Press, Ltd. p. 29.
- Clute, John; Peter Nicholls (1995). The Encyclopedia of Science Fiction. New York: St. Martin's Griffin. p. 1296. ISBN 0-312-13486-X.
