= Three Tales (Wandrei) =

- Cover of the first edition
- Author: Howard Wandrei
- Cover artist: Robert Garcia and Howard Wandrei
- Language: English
- Genre: Science fiction, Fantasy and Horror
- Publisher: Fedogan & Bremer
- Publication date: 1995
- Publication place: United States
- Media type: Print (paperback)
- Pages: iii, 48, vi

Three Tales is a collection of three science fiction, fantasy and horror stories by American writer Howard Wandrei. It was released in 1995 by Fedogan & Bremer in an edition of 500 copies. The book was given to guests at the 1995 World Fantasy Convention in order to promote Wandrei's forthcoming collection Time Burial. Two of the stories originally appeared in the magazine Astounding Stories. The other appeared in Weird Tales. The entire contents of the chapbook are included in Time Burial.

== Contents ==
- "Buried in Time" (introduction), by Dwayne F. Olson
- "The Hexer"
- "The Hand of the O'Mecca"
- "The Black Farm"

== Sources ==
- Brown, Charles N.; William G. Contento. "The Locus Index to Science Fiction (1984-1998)".
- Chalker, Jack L.; Mark Owings (1998). The Science-Fantasy Publishers: A Bibliographic History, 1923-1998. Westminster, MD and Baltimore: Mirage Press, Ltd. p. 254.
