= Frost (collection) =

2000 anthology by Donald Wandrei

- Dust-jacket from the first edition
- Author: Donald Wandrei
- Cover artist: Les Edwards
- Language: English
- Genre: Detective short stories
- Publisher: F & B Mystery
- Publication date: 2000
- Publication place: United States
- Media type: Print (hardback)
- Pages: xii, 306 pp
- ISBN: 1-878252-42-9
- OCLC: 46317381

Frost is a collection of mystery stories by author Donald Wandrei. It was released in 2000 by F & B Mystery in an edition of 1,100 copies of which 100 were signed by the editor and artist and released in a slipcase with Wandrei's Three Mysteries. The stories features Wandrei's scientist detective I. V. Frost and originally appeared in the magazine Clues Detective. It collects the first 8 stories, with the final 10 planned for a subsequent volume. This never appeared. Haffner Press has put out a complete collection of I.V. Frost (2020).
