= Here Be Daemons =

1978 novel by Basil Copper

- First edition
- Author: Basil Copper
- Cover artist: Colin Andrews
- Language: English
- Genre: Gothic novel, Horror novel
- Publisher: Robert Hale (UK); St. Martin's Press (US)
- Publication date: 1978
- Publication place: United Kingdom
- Media type: Print (Hardback)
- Pages: xii, 213 pp
- ISBN: 0-7221-2499-6
- OCLC: 5353095
- Dewey Decimal: 823/.9/14
- LC Class: PZ4.C7857 Ne 1980 PR6053.O658

Here Be Daemons: Tales of Horror and the Uneasy is a short story anthology by author Basil Copper. It was published by Robert Hale Publishing in 1978. It was Copper's third book published and was reissued in paperback by Sphere Books, 1981.

== Stories ==
- Old Mrs Cartwright
- The Knocker at the Portico
- The Way the World Died
- The Second Passenger
- The Treasure of Our Lady
- Justice at the Crossroads
- Mrs Van Donk
- The Trodes
- The Great Vore
