= Collected Poems (Tierney) =

1981 collection of poems by Richard L. Tierney

Collected Poems: Nightmares and Visions
- Cover of Collected Poems
- Author: Richard L. Tierney
- Illustrator: Jason Van Hollander
- Language: English
- Genre: poetry
- Publisher: Arkham House
- Publication date: 1981
- Publication place: United States
- Media type: Print (Paperback)
- Pages: ix, 82 pp
- ISBN: 0-87054-092-0
- OCLC: 7576918
- Dewey Decimal: 813/.54 19
- LC Class: PS3570.I332 C6

Collected Poems: Nightmares and Visions is a collection of poems by Richard L. Tierney. It was released in 1981 by Arkham House in an edition of 1,030 copies. The book is illustrated by Jason Van Hollander. The poems had previously appeared in such magazines as The Arkham Collector, Whispers, Nyctalops, Macabre, The Diversifier, Literary Magazine of Fantasy and Terror, Ambrosia, Dark Messenger Reader, Myrrdin, Fantasy Crossroads and others.

Literary historian Don Herron has stated that the collection presents Tierney as "one of the most technically accomplished sonneteers of his generation, able to bring rhyming forms to bear on his own concerns, such as the especially nihilistic concluding poem "To the Hydrogen Bomb".

== Contents ==
Collected Poems contains the following poems:

1. "A Man in the Crowd"
2. "The Altar"
3. "Sabbat"
4. "In Halls of Fantasy"
5. "To Gorice XII, King in Carcë"
6. "Night Visitant"
7. "The Nereid"
8. "The Dreadful City"
9. "The Madness of the Oracle"
10. "The Moon of Endless Night"
11. "Hate"
12. "The Scrolls"
13. "Jack the Ripper"
14. "Moubata"
15. "The Garret-Room"
16. "In Evil Dreams"
17. "The Hills"
18. "The Volcano"
19. "Demon-Star"
20. "The Pinnacles"
21. "Zarria"
22. "The Shadow"
23. "Star-Dreams"
24. "The Mountain"
25. "The Sleeper"
26. "The Pilgrimage"
27. "The Vengeance of Earth"
28. "The Evil House"
29. "Homesickness"
30. "A Vision on a Midsummer Night"
31. "Fulfillment"
32. "The Doom Prophet"
33. "Found in a Storm-Destroyed Lighthouse"
34. "Gods"
35. "Tahuantin-Suyu"
36. "Sonnet to a Box Elder Bug"
37. "The Legend"
38. "Yahweh"
39. "Mountains of Madness"
40. "Carcosa"
41. "The Wendigo"
42. "To Great Cthulhu"
43. "Carpathian Dream"
44. "The Swamp Dweller"
45. "To Mount Sinai"
46. "Dream"
47. "Escape"
48. "Beyond the Maze"
49. "Zora Rach Nam Psarrion"
50. "The Image"
51. "The Great City"
52. "Optimism"
53. "The Jewels"
54. "Giantess"
55. "The Cat"
56. "The Balcony"
57. "To a Girl Who is Too Gay"
58. "Minas Morgul"
59. "Mordor"
60. "Hope"
61. "Illusion"
62. "A Glimpse of Hell"
63. "Contempt"
64. "The Serpent-Men"
65. "Enchantress"
66. "Prayer to Zathog"
67. "To the Hydrogen Bomb"
