= Three Mysteries =

- First edition
- Author: Donald Wandrei
- Language: English
- Genre: Detective fiction
- Publisher: F & B Mystery
- Publication date: 2000
- Publication place: United States
- Media type: Print (paperback)
- Pages: 38 pp
- OCLC: 51309341

Three Mysteries is a collection of mystery stories by author Donald Wandrei. It was released in 2000 by F & B Mystery in an edition of 125 copies of which 100 were released in a slipcase with the limited edition of Wandrei's Frost.

== Contents ==
- "The Siege of Mr. Martin"
- "Dramatic Touch"
- "Game of Legs"
