= Saith the Lord =

Book by Howard Wandrei

- Author: Howard Wandrei
- Illustrator: Howard Wandrei
- Language: English
- Genre: Mystery
- Publisher: F & B Mystery
- Publication date: 1996
- Publication place: United States
- Media type: Print (hardback & paperback)
- Pages: xvi, 29 pp
- OCLC: 36126125

Saith the Lord is a short book by author Howard Wandrei that bundles a mystery story with a letter and a short autobiography. It was released in 1996 by F & B Mystery in an edition of 350 copies of which 100 were specially bound in Lexotone, signed by the editor, numbered and released in a slipcase with Wandrei's The Last Pin. The remaining 250 copies were bound in card stock and given away to guests at the 1996 World Fantasy Convention. The story originally appeared in the magazine Black Mask in 1940.

== Contents ==
- Introduction, by D. H. Olson"
- "Saith the Lord"
- "A Night on the Town" (letter)
- "In His Own Words" (autobiography)
