= The Last Pin =

- Dust-jacket from the first edition
- Author: Howard Wandrei
- Illustrator: Gary Gianni
- Cover artist: Gary Gianni
- Language: English
- Genre: Mystery
- Publisher: F & B Mystery
- Publication date: 1996
- Publication place: United States
- Media type: Print (hardback)
- Pages: xxviii, 355 pp
- ISBN: 1-878252-25-9
- OCLC: 36283116

The Last Pin is a series of mystery stories by author Howard Wandrei. It was released in 1996 by F & B Mystery in an edition of 1,600 copies of which 100 were specially bound and released in a slipcase with Wandrei's Saith the Lord. The stories originally appeared in the magazines Detective Fiction Weekly, Private Detective Stories, Detective Action Stories, Spicy Detective Stories, Romantic Detective, and Black Mask under Wandrei's pseudonyms, Robert A. Garron and H. W. Guernsey.

== Contents ==
- Introduction, by D. H. Olson
- "Smot Guy"
- "Wrong Number"
- "I’ll Be Murdering You"
- "The Man with the Molten Face"
- "League of Bald Men"
- "Marked in Indigo"
- "Too Good Looking"
- "Dressed to Kill"
- "Jongkovski’s Wife"
- "Fur-Bearing Animal"
- "The Last Pin"
