= The Sand Dwellers =

1998 novel by Adam Niswander

- Dust-jacket from the first edition
- Author: Adam Niswander
- Illustrator: H. E. Fassl
- Cover artist: H. E. Fassl
- Language: English
- Genre: Horror novel
- Publisher: Fedogan & Bremer
- Publication date: 1998
- Publication place: United States
- Media type: Print (Hardback)
- Pages: 263 pp
- ISBN: 1-878252-29-1
- OCLC: 40196050

The Sand Dwellers is a horror novel of the Cthulhu Mythos by author Adam Niswander. It was published by Fedogan & Bremer in 1998 in an edition of 1,000 copies of which 100 were numbered and signed by the author and illustrator.

== Plot introduction ==
The novel is set in the Superstition Mountains where the commander of a secret military installation is affected by strange forces that take over his mind.
