= The House of the Toad =

1993 novel by Richard L. Tierney

- Dust-jacket from the first edition
- Author: Richard L. Tierney
- Illustrator: Harry O. Morris
- Cover artist: Harry O. Morris
- Language: English
- Genre: Horror
- Publisher: Fedogan & Bremer
- Publication date: 1993
- Publication place: United States
- Media type: Print (Hardback)
- Pages: 248
- ISBN: 1-878252-03-8
- OCLC: 28757784
- Dewey Decimal: 813/.54 20
- LC Class: PS3570.I332 H68 1993

The House of the Toad is a Cthulhu Mythos horror novel by American writer Richard L. Tierney. It was published by Fedogan & Bremer in 1993 in an edition of 1,050 copies of which 100 comprised a limited edition numbered and signed by the author and illustrator on a special plate affixed to the front free endpaper. The volume was illustrated by Harry O. Morris, who had published Tierney's first novel, The Winds of Zarr, in 1975, through his Silver Scarab Press.

Well-versed in Mesoamerican archaeology, Tierney, during his time working for the U.S. Forest Service, spent four winters in Mexico, Central and South America visiting ancient Amerind ruins (1962–66), photographing many of the most remote mountain and jungle sites. He later utilised this background for The House of the Toad.

== Plot ==
The novel follows James Kerrick, an archaeologist and black marketeer who for years has eked out a living looting archaeological treasures for sale on the international black market. Finally, in the ruins of a lost city in the region of Azcapotzalco in Mexico, he makes a discovery for which a Midwestern millionaire, J. Cornelius Wasserman, is willing to pay a fortune. For Kerrick, a bitter American ex-patriate, it is a chance to retire once and for all from his dangerous profession - and an opportunity to return home to see the woman he left behind years before. But she has inexplicably vanished and Wassermann is no ordinary collector.

To his mounting terror, Kerrick is inexorably swept into a vast conspiracy of ancient cults and international intrigue. Worse still, the stars are becoming right. Various of the evil characters are servitors of the Primal Ones, incredibly ancient and powerful entities which sowed life throughout the universe and caused it to evolve both intelligence and the capacity to suffer.

The novel incorporates references to Robert W. Chambers's King in Yellow mythology as well as to H.P. Lovecraft's Cthulhu Mythos. The god Ghanta in the story is hinted to be identical to the Ghatanothoa of Lovecraft's story "Out of the Aeons".

== Critical reception ==
S.T. Joshi provides an extensive description of the plot and a criticism of the work in his The Rise and Fall of the Cthulhu Mythos (Mythos Books, 2008), pp. 273–75. Other reviewers have described the novel as having an Indiana Jones meets H.P. Lovecraft feel." Agent Kirby McCauley wrote of the novel that it was "an exciting and welcomed venture into dark and cosmic realms by one of the foremost authors writing in the tradition of H.P. L Lovecraft." Michael A. Morrison, reviewing the novel for Necrofile found that the novel failed to convince, though stating that "Tierney is a fine writer, with a special gift for evocative descriptions of place, and he makes a more serious effort at characterization than one is accustomed to in modern Mythos yarns."

== Sources ==
- Brown, Charles N.; William G. Contento. "The Locus Index to Science Fiction (1984-1998)".
- Chalker, Jack L.; Mark Owings (1998). The Science-Fantasy Publishers: A Bibliographic History, 1923-1998. Westminster, MD and Baltimore: Mirage Press, Ltd. p. 252.
