= Acolytes of Cthulhu =

Anthology of Cthulhu Mythos stories

- Dust-jacket from the first edition
- Author: edited by Robert M. Price
- Cover artist: Gahan Wilson
- Language: English
- Genre: Fantasy, Horror short stories
- Published: 2001 (Fedogan & Bremer)
- Publication place: United States
- Media type: Print (hardback)
- Pages: xvi, 390 pp
- ISBN: 1-878252-47-X
- OCLC: 47236234

Acolytes of Cthulhu is an anthology of Cthulhu Mythos stories edited by Robert M. Price. It was published by Fedogan & Bremer in 2001 in an edition of 2,500 copies. Many of the stories originally appeared in the magazines Weird Tales, Unusual Stories, The Acolyte, Stirring Science Stories, Fantastic, Magazine of Horror, Weird Terror Tales, Supernatural Stories, Atlantic Monthly, Fantasy and Science Fiction, Lovecraftian Ramblings, The Nectotic Scroll, Eldritch Tales, Tales of Lovecraftian Horror and Alfred Hitchcock's Mystery Magazine.

A 2014 reprint edition by Titan omitted the story "Black Noon" by Eddy, which was an unfinished 1969 story based on a long hike that Eddy and Lovecraft had actually undertaken in the early 1920s, in search of a remote and lore-hunted 'Dark Swamp' area of New England.

== Contents ==
- "Introduction", by Robert M. Price
- "Doom of the House of Duryea", by Earl Pierce, Jr.
- "The Seventh Incantation", by Joseph Payne Brennan
- "Black Noon", by C. M. Eddy, Jr.
- "The Jewels of Charlotte", by Duane Rimel
- "The Letters of Cold Fire", by Manly Wade Wellman
- "Horror at Vecra", by Henry Hasse
- "Out of the Jar", by Charles R. Tanner
- "The Earth-Brain", by Edmond Hamilton
- "Through the Alien Angle", by Elwin G. Powers
- "Legacy in Crystal", by James Causey
- "The Will of Claude Ashur", by C. Hall Thompson
- "The Final War", by David H. Keller, M.D.
- "The Dunstable Horror", by Arthur Pendragon
- "The Crib of Hell", by Arthur Pendragon
- "The Last Work of Pietro of Apono", by Steffan B. Aletti
- "The Eye of Horus", by Steffan B. Aletti
- "The Cellar Room", by Steffan B. Aletti
- "Mythos", by John Glasby
- "There Are More Things", by Jorge Luis Borges
- "The Horror Out of Time", by Randall Garrett
- "The Recurring Doom", by S. T. Joshi
- "Necrotic Knowledge", by Dirk W. Mosig
- "Night Bus", by Donald R. Burleson
- "The Pewter Ring", by Peter Cannon
- "John Lehmann Alone", by David Kaufman
- "The Purple Death", by Gustav Meyrink, translated by Kathleen Houlihan & Robert M. Price
- "Mists of Death", by Richard F. & Franklyn Searight
- "Shoggoth’s Old Peculiar", by Neil Gaiman
