= The Door Below =

- Dust-jacket from the first edition
- Author: Hugh B. Cave
- Illustrator: Alan M. Clark
- Cover artist: Alan M. Clark
- Language: English
- Genre: fantasy, horror and mystery
- Publisher: Fedogan & Bremer
- Publication date: 1997
- Publication place: United States
- Media type: Print (hardback)
- Pages: ii, 333
- ISBN: 1-878252-30-5
- OCLC: 38490900

The Door Below is a collection of fantasy and horror and mystery short stories by American writer Hugh B. Cave. It was released in 1997 by Fedogan & Bremer in an edition of 1,100 copies, of which 100 were signed by the author. Many of the stories originally appeared in the magazines Horror Stories, Spicy Mystery Stories, Detective Fiction Weekly, Terror Tales, Fantasy Tales, Whispers, Crypt of Cthulhu, Shudder Stories, Borderland, Phantasm and Alfred Hitchcock's Mystery Magazine.

== Contents ==
- Foreword
- The 1930s
  - "Imp of Satan"
  - "Doom Door"
  - "Disturb Not the Dead"
  - "Six Were Slain"
  - "Servant of Satan"
- The 1940s
  - "The Hostage"
  - "Beneath the Vapor Veil"
  - "The Thirsty Thing"
  - "Calavan"
  - "The Thing from the Swamp"
- The 1970s
  - "From the Lower Deep"
- The 1980s
  - "A Place of No Return"
  - "The Door Below"
  - "After the Funeral"
  - "Damballa’s Slough"
  - "Just the Two of Us"
  - "Damsels for the Damned"
  - "Of Time & Space"
- The 1990s
  - "Chernick"
  - "The Hard-Luck Kid"
  - "Another Kind of Enchanted Cottage"
  - "Gordie’s Pets"
  - "Just Another H.P.L. Horror Story"
  - "Don’t Open the Door!"
  - "Vanishing Point"
