= Dark Things =

1971 anthology of horror stories edited by August Derleth

- Dust-jacket illustration by Herb Arnold, design by Gary Gore.
- Editor: August Derleth
- Cover artist: Herb Arnold, design by Gary Gore
- Language: English
- Genre: Fantasy, Horror
- Publisher: Arkham House
- Publication date: 1971
- Publication place: United States
- Media type: Print (hardback)
- Pages: 330

Dark Things is an anthology of horror stories edited by American writer August Derleth. It was released in 1971 by Arkham House in an edition of 3,051 copies. It was Derleth's fourth anthology of previously unpublished stories released by Arkham House. A translation in Japanese has also been released.

== Contents ==
Dark Things contains the following tales:

- "The Funny Farm", by Robert Bloch
- "The Eyes of Mme. Dupree", by P.H. Booth
- "'The Peril That Lurks Among Ruins'", by Joseph Payne Brennan
- "Napier Court", by Ramsey Campbell
- "Shaggai", by Lin Carter (Cthulhu Mythos tale)
- "The Dweller in the Tomb", by Lin Carter (Cthulhu Mythos tale)
- "The House by the Tarn", by Basil Copper
- "The Knocker at the Portico", by Basil Copper
- "Lord of the Depths", by David Drake
- "Omega", by Alice R. Hill
- "The House in the Oaks", by Robert E. Howard and August Derleth
- "The Singleton Barrier", by Carl Jacobi
- "The Case of the Double Husband", by Margery Lawrence
- "Innsmouth Clay", by H. P. Lovecraft and August Derleth
- "The Conch Shell", by Brian Lumley
- "Rising With Surtsey", by Brian Lumley
- "Company in the Orchard", by Francis May
- "'Beyondaril'", by John Metcalfe
- "The Manterfield Inheritance", by Charles Partington
- "The Storm King", by Emil Petaja
- "The Elevator", by James Wade
- "Appointment with Fire", by H. Russell Wakefield
- "The Rings of the Papaloi", by Donald J. Walsh, Jr.
- "Requiem for Earth", by Donald Wandrei

== Sources ==
- Jaffery, Sheldon (1989). The Arkham House Companion. Mercer Island: Starmont House, Inc. pp. 99–100. ISBN 1-55742-005-X.
- Chalker, Jack L.; Mark Owings (1998). The Science-Fantasy Publishers: A Bibliographic History, 1923-1998. Westminster, MD and Baltimore: Mirage Press, Ltd. p. 48.
- Joshi, S.T. (1999). Sixty Years of Arkham House: A History and Bibliography. Sauk City: Arkham House. pp. 124–125. ISBN 0-87054-176-5.
- Nielsen, Leon (2004). Arkham House Books: A Collector's Guide. Jefferson and London: McFarland & Company, Inc. pp. 113–114. ISBN 0-7864-1785-4.
