= Cormac Fitzgeoffrey =

Fictional character

Cormac FitzGeoffrey is a fictional character created by Robert E. Howard. He is a half-Norman, half-Gael Knight who is taking part in the Third Crusade. Howard wrote two short stories featuring the character and a synopsis that was later completed by another author. Although Howard was most famous for his fantasy fiction, especially Conan the Barbarian, the Cormac stories have for the majority a purely historical setting, albeit the second one involves Lovecraftian elements.

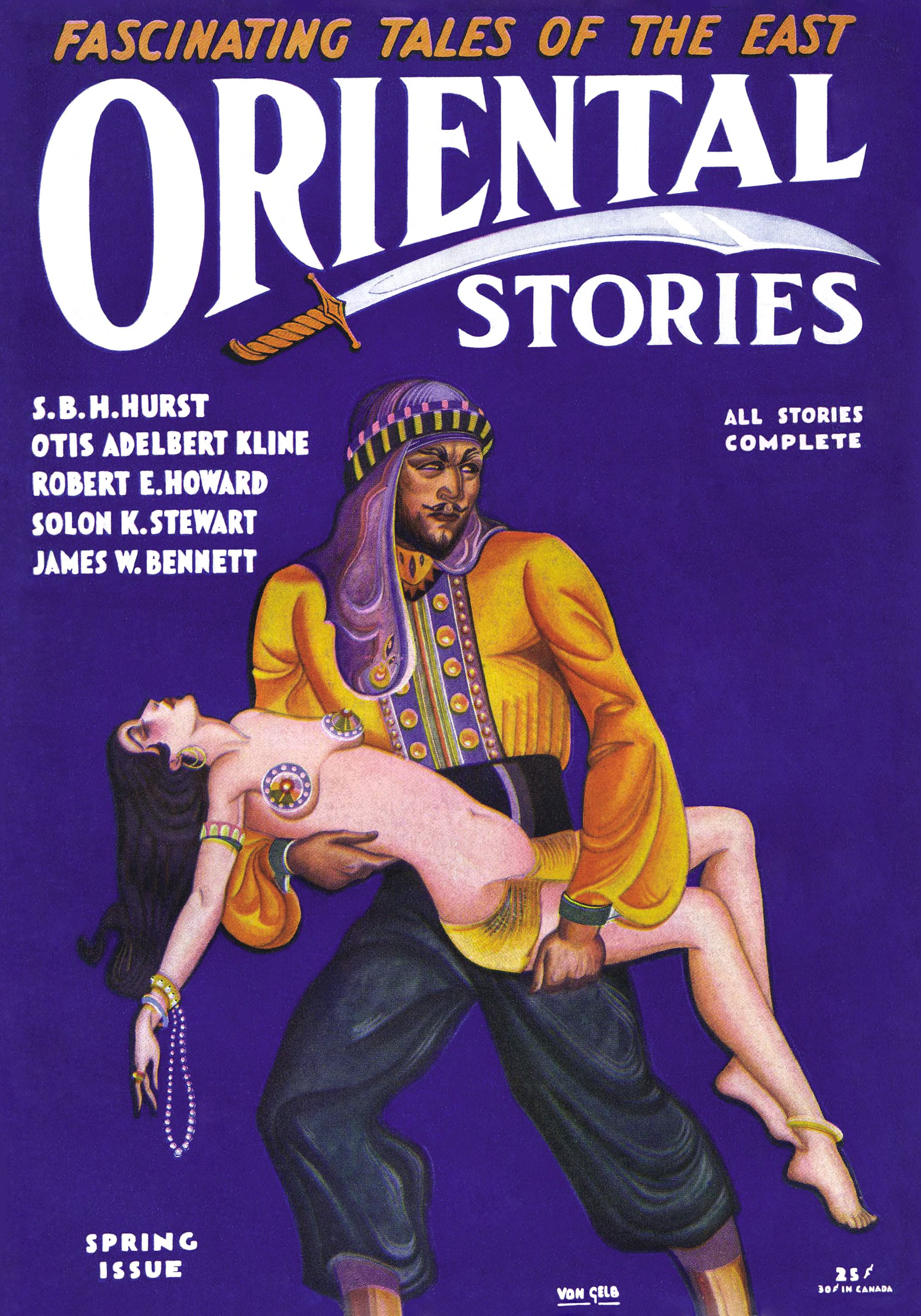
"Hawks of Outremer" was originally published in the Spring 1931 issue of Oriental Stories

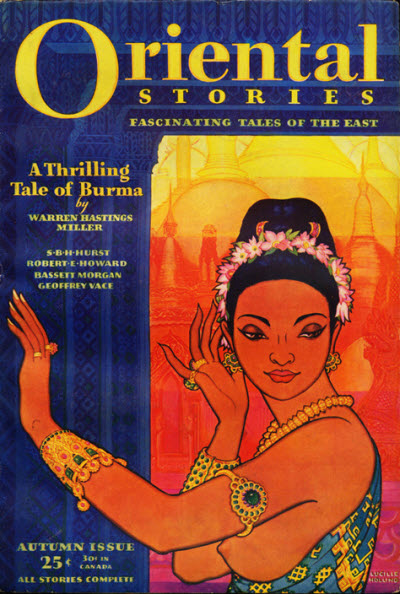
"The Blood of Belshazzar" was originally published in the Autumn 1931 issue of Oriental Stories

== Stories ==
Howard wrote two complete Cormac Fitzgeoffrey stories and left one unfinished before his death. The character is also mentioned in the story The Sowers of the Thunder, set fifty years later and published in 1932.

=== "Hawks of Outremer" ===
First published in Oriental Stories (Spring 1931) after being accepted by that magazine in October 1930. "Outremer" (literally, "Oversea") was how the Crusader states were often called.

=== "The Blood of Belshazzar" ===
First published in Oriental Stories (Fall 1931) after being accepted by that magazine in December 1930.

=== "The Slave-Princess" ===
Howard left this story as an incomplete synopsis. It was later completed by Richard L. Tierney and first published in 1979 in the Donald M. Grant hardback collection Hawks of Outremer.

== Adaptations ==
Savage Sword of Conan #12 began an adaptation of "The Slave Princess", with Conan the Barbarian replacing Fitzgeoffrey as the main character, and the real-life locations swapped for those of the Hyborian Age.

Savage Sword of Conan #222 began an adaptation of "Hawks of Outremer", with Conan the Barbarian replacing Fitzgeoffrey as the main character, and the real-life locations swapped for those of the Hyborian Age.

"The Blood of Belshazzar" was adapted by Marvel Comics as a Conan story in Conan the Barbarian #27 ("The Blood of Bel-Hissar", June 1973) with writer/editor Roy Thomas and artist John Buscema.

Boom Studios has adapted "Hawks of Outremer" for a comic book miniseries which begin in June, 2010.
