= Before...12:01...and After =

Before…12:01…and After
- Dust-jacket from the first edition
- Author: Richard A. Lupoff
- Illustrator: George Barr
- Cover artist: George Barr
- Language: English
- Genre: Science fiction, fantasy, mystery and horror short stories
- Publisher: Fedogan & Bremer
- Publication date: 1996
- Publication place: United States
- Media type: Print (hardback)
- Pages: xxi, 375 pp
- ISBN: 1-878252-23-2
- OCLC: 35189745

Before...12:01...and After is a collection of science fiction, fantasy, mystery and horror stories by author Richard A. Lupoff. It was released in 1996 by Fedogan & Bremer in an edition of 2,100 copies of which 100 were signed by the author and the artist. Many of the stories originally appeared in the magazines Pagoda, Fantasy and Science Fiction, Heavy Metal, Fantastic, Whispers, Isaac Asimov's Science Fiction Magazine, Detective Story Magazine, Hardboiled and Ellery Queen's Mystery Magazine.

== Contents ==
- "Foreword: About Dick Lupoff", by Robert Silverberg
- "Introduction: How I Learned to Read"
- "Mr. Greene and the Monster"
- "BOOM!"
- "Incident in the 14th St. BMT"
- "After the Dreamtime"
- "12:01 P.M."
- "Venus—Ah, Venus!"
- "With the Evening News"
- "Saltzman’s Madness"
- "God of the Naked Unicorn"
- "Nebogipfel at the End of Time"
- "Mort in Bed"
- "Stroka Prospekt"
- "Two Sort-Of Adventures"
- "Blinky Henderson Again"
- "The Digital Wristwatch of Philip K. Dick"
- "Snow Ghosts"
- "Triptych"
- "The House on Rue Chartres"
- "The Doom That Came to Dunwich"
- "The Woodstock West Killer"
- "Easy Living"
- "Dogwalker"
- "A Funny Thing Happened..."
- "A Richard A. Lupoff Bibliography", by Dave Nee
