= Whispers in the Night =

- Dust-jacket from the first edition
- Author: Basil Copper
- Illustrator: Stephen E. Fabian
- Cover artist: Stephen E. Fabian
- Language: English
- Genre: Horror, suspense, science-fiction short stories
- Publisher: Fedogan & Bremer
- Publication date: 1999
- Publication place: United States
- Media type: Print (hardback)
- Pages: xi, 273 pp
- ISBN: 1-878252-40-2
- OCLC: 42464760

Whispers in the Night: Stories of the Mysterious & Macabre is a collection of horror, suspense and science fiction short stories by author Basil Copper. It was released in 1999 by Fedogan & Bremer in an edition of 1,100 copies of which 100 were numbered and signed by the author and artist. All but three of the stories are original to this collection. The others first appeared in the anthologies The Mammoth Book of Frankenstein, The Vampire Omnibus and Horror for Christmas.

== Contents ==
- "Out of the Fog: Recollection", by Stephen Jones
- "Better Dead"
- "Reader, I Buried Him!"
- "One for the Pot"
- "Wish You Were Here"
- "In a Darkling Wood"
- "The Grass"
- "Riding the Chariot"
- "Final Destination"
- "The Obelisk"
- "Out There"
- "The Summerhouse"
