= A Coven of Vampires =

1998 book by Brian Lumley

- Dust-jacket from the first edition
- Author: Brian Lumley
- Illustrator: Bob Eggleton
- Cover artist: Bob Eggleton
- Language: English
- Genre: Horror
- Published: 1998 (Fedogan & Bremer)
- Publication place: United Kingdom
- Media type: Print (hardback)
- Pages: ix, 228
- ISBN: 1-878252-37-2
- OCLC: 39854583

A Coven of Vampires is a collection of horror short stories by English writer Brian Lumley. The stories all concern vampires. It was released in 1998 by Fedogan & Bremer in an edition of 1,100 copies, of which 100 were numbered and signed by the author, and illustrator. Most of the stories originally appeared in a number of different anthologies and collections or in the magazines Terror Australis, Fantasy Tales, Weirdbook, Fear!, Fantasy and Science Fiction and Kadath.

== Contents ==
- Foreword
- "What Dark God?"
- "Back Row"
- "The Strange Years"
- "Kiss of the Lamia"
- "Recognition"
- "The Thief Immortal"
- "Necros"
- "The Thing from the Blasted Heath"
- "Uzzi"
- "Haggopian"
- "The Picnickers"
- "Zack Phalanx Is Vlad the Impaler"
- "The House of the Temple"

== Sources ==
- Brown, Charles N.; William G. Contento. "The Locus Index to Science Fiction (1984-1998)". Archived from the original on 30 March 2008.
- Chalker, Jack L.; Mark Owings (1998). The Science-Fantasy Publishers: A Bibliographic History, 1923-1998. Westminster, MD and Baltimore: Mirage Press, Ltd. p. 257.
