= Time Burial =

- Dust-jacket from the first edition
- Author: Howard Wandrei
- Illustrator: Howard Wandrei
- Cover artist: Howard Wandrei
- Language: English
- Genre: Science fiction, fantasy, horror
- Publisher: Fedogan & Bremer
- Publication date: 1995
- Publication place: United States
- Media type: Print (hardback)
- Pages: xlviii, 317
- ISBN: 1-878252-22-4
- OCLC: 35006941

Time Burial is a collection of science fiction, fantasy and horror stories by American writer Howard Wandrei. It was released in 1995 by Fedogan & Bremer in an edition of 1,500 copies. Most of the stories originally appeared in the magazines Unknown, Astounding Stories, Spicy Mystery Stories, Weird Tales and The Arkham Collector. A collection of this title, but with different contents, was originally announced by Arkham House but never published.

== Contents ==
- Introduction, by D. H. Olson
- "The Hexer"
- "The Black Farm"
- "Macklin’s Little Friend"
- "The Glass Coffin"
- "Don’t Go Haunting"
- "’Tis Claude"
- "The Wall"
- "Here Lies"
- "Exit Willy Carney"
- "The God Box"
- "The Missing Ocean"
- "The Hand of the O’Mecca"
- "Master-the-Third"
- "Over Time’s Threshold"
- "Time Burial"
- "O Little Nightmare!"
- "In the Triangle"
- "The Other"
- "After You, Montague"
- "The Monocle"

== Sources ==
- Brown, Charles N.; William G. Contento. "The Locus Index to Science Fiction (1984-1998)".
- Chalker, Jack L.; Mark Owings (1998). The Science-Fantasy Publishers: A Bibliographic History, 1923-1998. Westminster, MD and Baltimore: Mirage Press, Ltd. p. 254.
