= Don't Dream =

1997 collection of science fiction, fantasy and horror stories by Donald Wandrei

- Dust-jacket from the first edition
- Author: Donald Wandrei
- Illustrator: Rodger Gerberding
- Cover artist: Jon Arfstrom
- Language: English
- Genre: Science fiction, Fantasy, Horror short stories, Prose poetry, essays
- Publisher: Fedogan & Bremer
- Publication date: 1989
- Publication place: United States
- Media type: Print (hardback)
- Pages: xv, 395 pp
- ISBN: 1-878252-27-5
- OCLC: 37738363

Don't Dream is a collection of science fiction, fantasy and horror stories by author Donald Wandrei. It was released in 1997 by Fedogan & Bremer in an edition of 2,000 copies. The collection also includes a number of Wandrei's essays and prose poems. Many of the stories, essays and poems originally appeared in the magazines The Minnesota Quarterly, Weird Tales, Astounding Stories, Fantasy Magazine, Argosy, Esquire, Unknown and Leaves.

== Contents ==
- Editors’ Note, by Philip J. Rahman & Dennis E. Weiler
- Introduction, Helen Mary Hughesdon
- Fiction
  - "A Fragment of a Dream"
  - "The Shadow of a Nightmare"
  - "The Green Flame"
  - "The Tree-Men of M’bwa"
  - "When the Fire Creatures Came"
  - "The Lives of Alfred Kramer"
  - "The Fire Vampires"
  - "Spawn of the Sea"
  - "The Lady in Gray"
  - "The Man Who Never Lived"
  - "The Nerveless Man"
  - "The Chuckler"
  - "A Scientist Divides"
  - "The Destroying Horde"
  - "The Monster from Nowhere"
  - "The Witch-Makers"
  - "The Eye and the Finger"
  - "The Painted Mirror"
  - "Uneasy Lie the Drowned"
  - "Giant-Plasm"
  - "Don’t Dream"
  - "It Will Grow On You"
  - "Strange Harvest"
  - "Nightmare"
  - "The Crater"
  - "Delirium of the Dead"
- Prose Poems, Essays, and Marginalia
  - "The Messengers"
  - "The Pursuers"
  - "The Woman at the Window"
  - "The Purple Land"
  - "Dreaming Away My Life"
  - "Black Flame"
  - "The Shrieking House"
  - "The Phantom City"
  - "The Kingdom of Dreams"
  - "The Lotus and the Poppy"
  - "Unforgotten Night"
  - "Santon Merlin"
  - "Cigarette Characterization"
  - "The Imaginative Element in Modern Literature"
- "Of Donald Wandrei, August Derleth and H.P.Lovecraft", by D. H. Olson
