= Hawks of Outremer (short story collection) =

Short story collection by Robert E. Howard

- Cover of the first edition
- Author: Robert E. Howard
- Illustrator: Rob MacIntyre and Chris Pappas
- Cover artist: Rob MacIntyre and Chris Pappas
- Language: English
- Series: Cormac Fitzgeoffrey
- Genre: Historical short stories
- Publisher: Donald M. Grant, Publisher, Inc.
- Publication date: 1979
- Publication place: United States
- Media type: Print (hardback)
- Pages: 153 pp
- OCLC: 5297615

Hawks of Outremer is a collection of historical short stories by Robert E. Howard. It was first published in 1979 by Donald M. Grant, Publisher, Inc. in an edition of 1,625 copies. The stories feature Howard's character Cormac Fitzgeoffrey and was edited by Richard L. Tierney. "Outremer" (literally, "Oversea") was how the Crusader states were often called; Fitzgeoffrey is depicted as a participant in the Third Crusade.

== Contents ==
- "Hawks of Outremer"
- "The Blood of Belshazzar"
- "The Slave-Princess" (completed by Richard L. Tierney)
