= Richard L. Tierney =

American writer, poet and scholar (1936–2022)

- Born: Richard Louis Tierney; August 7, 1936; Spencer, Iowa, U.S.
- Died: February 1, 2022 (aged 85); Mason City, Iowa, U.S.
- Occupations: Poet; novelist; short story writer
- Writing career
- Genres: poetry, fantasy, horror

Richard Louis Tierney (August 7, 1936 – February 1, 2022) was an American writer, poet and scholar of H. P. Lovecraft, probably best known for his heroic fantasy, including his series co-authored (with David C. Smith) of Red Sonja novels, featuring cover art by Boris Vallejo. He lived the latter part of his life in Mason City in the great Corn Steppes of Iowa. Some of his standalone novels utilize the mythology of Lovecraft's Cthulhu Mythos. He is also known for his Simon of Gitta series (stories which cross historical Gnosticism with Lovecraft's Cthulhu Mythos) and his Robert E. Howard completions and utilisation of such Howard-invented characters as Cormac Mac Art, Bran Mak Morn and Cormac Fitzgeoffrey.

Tierney is especially renowned for his weird and fantastic verse, which has been acclaimed by such critics, writers, and poets as S. T. Joshi, Don Herron, Ramsey Campbell, Robert M. Price, Donald Sidney-Fryer, and Frank Belknap Long. In 1993, Tierney was presented with the annual Minnesota Fantasy Award. He was nominated for Science Fiction Poetry Association Grand Master in 2010.

== Ancestry and Youth ==
Tierney was of Irish origin on his paternal side. His great-grandfather emigrated from Dublin with his family to the United States. His maternal parentage traces its lineage to the Mayflower and the first Quaker settlement at Nantucket Island, Mass via the line of Thomas Macy (1608–1682), an early settler of the Massachusetts Bay Colony and of Nantucket Island.

Tierney was born in Spencer, Iowa. His family moved to Mason City in 1942 when Tierney was six years old. He went through the public school system, attending Madison grade school, Roosevelt Junior High and a high school he referred to as "Old Bastille" since it was built of old dark brick and always felt like a prison to him. Tierney read two of H. P. Lovecraft's stories ("The Rats in the Walls" and "The Dunwich Horror") in the anthology Great Tales of Terror and the Supernatural edited by Wise and Fraser (1949) at about age thirteen, but was not especially impressed by them since they contained no conventional ghosts. At age 14, he read "Colossus' by Donald Wandrei in August Derleth's 1950 anthology Beyond Time and Space. Tierney has referred to this tale as "one of the most fascinating stories I had ever encountered, largely because of [its] poetic mood evoking a setting of trans-cosmic vastness. He would many years later become a neighbor and friend of Wandrei's in Minneapolis. Aged 15, and reading heavily in science fiction, Tierney read Lovecraft's "The Shadow Out of Time" in Donald A. Wollheim's Viking Portable Novels of Science and was 'hooked'. "Shadow" and At the Mountains of Madness became his two favourite Lovecraft tales.

Tierney was also influenced by the work of Tarzan creator, Edgar Rice Burroughs. At around the same age (15 or 16), he was inspired to write poetry by August Derleth's fantasy verse anthology Dark of the Moon: Poems of Fantasy and the Macabre which he read several times in the Mason City Public Library. While he had previously been a devotee of the poems of Edgar Allan Poe, he was especially inspired by the H. P. Lovecraft poems in the anthology (particularly the "Fungi from Yuggoth" and also those of Donald Wandrei, Robert E. Howard, Frank Belknap Long and others).

== 1950s: Early writing (fiction and poetry) ==
Tierney began writing fantastic stories in the early 1950s, aged around fifteen and came into his writing stride in his early twenties. His first attempt at a tale was a Lovecraftian story titled "Countdown for Kalara." Tierney destroyed its first draft but rewrote it; the rewritten version was later published in Space and Time 56 (July 1980) as well as being reprinted in Robert M. Price's anthology The Yith Cycle (Chaosium, 2010). He continued writing through the 1950s, producing numerous tales, some of which did not see print until the 1970s or later. For instance, "Life of the Party" (written in 1956) first appeared in Antithesis No 3 (1974). "The Dream" (written Nov 1956), was first printed in Crypt of Cthulhu No 86 (Eastertide 1994). "The Wrath of Tupan" (written April 1957) first appeared in Fantasy Crossroads (March 1977). "The Eggs of Pawa," which features Ralph Duncan, the protagonist of the novel The House of the Toad, was penned in May 1957 but did not see print until Eldritch Tales No 2 (1981). "From Beyond the Stars," another product of 1957, first appeared in Kirby McCauley's anthology Night Chills (Avon, 1975). "The Creatures" comes from the same productive year and first saw print in Eldritch Tales No 3 (1978; the dating is correct. Issue 2 of this magazine was printed three years later than No 3). Again, "The Howler in the Dark" was written in 1957 but did not see print until it appeared in Crypt of Cthulhu 24 (Vol 3, No 8, Lammas 1984); this appearance was minus a few lines of text which were restored in the printing in Robert M. Price's anthology" The Necronomicon (Chaosium, 1996).

== The Winds of Zarr, Tertiary Education, Amerind exploration ==
Tierney's first novel, The Winds of Zarr, which combined H. P. Lovecraft (including a Lovecraft-style deity named Zathog - see List of Great Old Ones), Robert E. Howard, time travel and ancient astronauts, and is set in Egypt during the New Kingdom, was penned in 1959 when Tierney was aged 23 but did not see print until 1975. Harry O. Morris, who published the work through his Silver Scarab Press, would later illustrate Tierney's novel The House of the Toad. The Winds of Zarr has cover art by Stephen Fabian and interior art by Randall Spurgin.

Tierney wrote his first Simon of Gitta tale, "The Ring of Set," in 1960; it lay around in manuscript for about 16 years until his friend Kirby McCauley submitted it to Andrew J. Offutt for his first Swords Against Darkness anthology, which appeared in 1977.

Tierney attended Iowa State College in Ames, studying forestry, his idea being to work in the wilderness and live a solitary existence - a plan which did not work out, since he made more friends than ever when he began his employment. During his first year at College, he wrote to August Derleth at Arkham House and started collecting their publications. Inspired by the poetry of Clark Ashton Smith and H.P. Lovecraft, he began to pen his own verse, but not knowing where to submit it, sent out none of his efforts until much later. He switched his major to Wildlife Management and graduated in 1961 with a bachelor's degree in entomology. Thereafter he worked for upwards of thirteen years (1958–71) for the U.S. Forest Service, firstly in Northwest Oregon for two seasons, then in Alaska collecting insects with a different field assistant each season for seven seasons, and eventually in a laboratory in Berkeley, CA for three years full-time. Tierney's earliest work to see print was some letters-of-comment in the pages of George H. Scithers' sword-and-sorcery fanzine Amra in 1961.

Tierney has written widely on a variety of esoteric topics, such as the legends concerning Mount Shasta and Amne Machin. One of his fellow Alaskan workers went to the University of Mexico and Tierney visited him. Well-versed in Meso-American archaeology, during his time working for the Forest Service he spent four winters on his own time in Mexico, Central and South America visiting ancient Amerind ruins (1962–66). While occupying cheap lodgings such as hotels in the cities or posadas in the villages, Tierney gave himself a crash course in Spanish and became fascinated with the Nahuatl people and culture. He spent much time in Yucatan and other areas photographing many of the most remote mountain and jungle sites — a background he uses in his later Peru-inspired Cthulhu Mythos novel The House of the Toad (1993).

In the Winter/Spring of 1964, Tierney took a five-month postgraduate course in Entomology at the University of Massachusetts, Amherst. His main purpose in going there was to visit Lovecraftian sites. He spent all of his Easter vacation in Providence, walking the streets of Lovecraft's neighborhood by day and night. He often talked with H. Douglass Dana, the proprietor of a Providence bookstore whom Lovecraft had known personally. At another bookstore he purchased Lovecraft's own copy of Keats' Endymion (poem) which was twice signed by Lovecraft. The volume was in poor condition, lacking the covers, but Tierney had it rebound by a bookbinder near Brown University. Around this time Tierney also took bus trips to Boston, Salem, Marblehead, and Brattleboro, Vermont - the setting of Lovecraft's The Whisperer in Darkness.

== 1960s and 1970s: Bay Area, Published Poetry, Minneapolis Years, Lovecraft studies, Art, Fictional Collaborations ==
Tierney lived in the San Francisco Bay area in the late 1960s and early 1970s, the height of the hippie rebellion. Tierney found the phone number of pulp writer E. Hoffmann Price, worked up the nerve to call him and tell him he was a fan of H.P. Lovecraft, and was invited to Price's residence for a visit. Thereafter, they got together frequently, often over a meal cooked by Price - usually an Indian curry or a Mexican chilli. Both writers were interested in Buddhism. Price often discussed with Tierney pulp writers he had known, such as Clark Ashton Smith. Price also lent him some paperback books he had published.

Between 1966 and 1973, Tierney published a number of fantastic poems in small press journals including Joseph Payne Brennan's Macabre; August Derleth's The Arkham Collector; Glenn Lord's The Howard Collector; Stuart David Schiff's Whispers (magazine); and The United Co-operative. During the 1970s, Tierney also began to submit verse to fantasy/horror markets such as Harry O. Morris's Nyctalops. His first collection of weird verse appeared under the title Dreams and Damnations, a slim volume of eight poems issued by R. Alain Everts' The Strange Company (of Madison, WI) in 1975 as a limited edition of 100 copies; this included a few of his translations for Charles Baudelaire. The collection was reviewed by Donald Sidney-Fryer in The Diversifier, 14 (May 1976); however an unfortunate law-suit brought by Everts in an attempt to prevent the publication of the Arkham House Collected Poems (Tierney)(1981) resulted in the Strange Company volume, though reprinted, being scarcely distributed.

In 1972, Tierney moved to Minneapolis to take up writing as a vocation. He lived for nearly nine years in the Twin Cities (Minneapolis–Saint Paul), which brought him in frequent contact with old-time horror/fantasy writers such as Carl Jacobi and Donald Wandrei. He had made Wandrei's acquaintance the year before through several telephone conversations while gathering copyright information for him on some Carl Jacobi stories that were soon to be published by Arkham House. He later provided the Introduction to Wandrei's volume of collected science fiction stories, Colossus. Kirby McCauley, whom Tierney had met a fantasy convention sometime prior, introduced him to the fledgling Minn-Conn, a society of like-minded fans begun by McCauley and John ('Jack') Koblas (aka 'Count Koblas'), who met in rotating fashion at members' homes. Members included the cartoonist Joseph (Joe) A. West; the photographer Eric Carlson (from Duluth, MN), Phillip Rahman (who would later found Fedogan and Bremer publishers) and his brother Glenn Rahman. Occasional attendees included such figures as R. Alain Everts of Madison, WI and the young S. T. Joshi. It was a topic of conversation that Donald Wandrei was still alive nearby, and members of the group frequently got together at Wandrei's house, attracted by the fact that Wandrei had known Lovecraft personally. They visited Carl Jacobi somewhat less often, since he had suffered a stroke which left him paralysed down one side and with a speech impediment. By 1988, with this group numbering in the dozens, the gatherings were made annual and featured professional guests. They were called MinnCons until Minncon 17 in 1987. Thereafter, the name of the convention was changed to Arcana (convention).

Kirby McCauley's girlfriend had a friend who worked at local occult publisher Llewellyn Worldwide and recommended Tierney for a job there on the strength of his occult interests; Tierney had read extensively on the occult and often drew horoscope charts for his friends, though he took none of this very seriously. Llewellyn employed him for a year and a half (1971–72). Tierney stayed in touch with his California friend E. Hoffmann Price, conducting an extensive correspondence with him.

While on a New York trip to visit Kirby McCauley, Tierney took a side trip to Nantucket Island to investigate his ancestral roots, in particular the homes connected with the Thomas Macy family. Macy was amongst the first settlers there - the Massachusetts Quakers who were driven out of MA by the Puritans.

Tierney made his mark in Lovecraft studies at this time by authoring the essay "The Derleth Mythos", first published in 1972 in Meade and Penny Frierson's HPL (Birmingham, Al: The Editors, 1972, 1975) and reprinted in 1976 in Darrell Schweitzer's Essays Lovecraftian (Baltimore, MD: TK Graphics). The essay famously separates Lovecraft's ideas of his Cthulhu mythos as based on a mechanistic materialist view of the universe, in which the Old Ones are entirely inimical to humankind, from the later elaborations by August Derleth whereby Derleth posited a more simplistic "good vs evil" paradigm underlying the Mythos. Essentially, Tierney argues that Lovecraft's cosmic outlook in his fiction was not intended to convey a "good vs evil" approach. Thus Derleth's version of the Cthulhu Mythos, which promotes the "good vs evil" concept derived from the Judaeo-Christian mythos, is untrue to Lovecraft's fictional philosophies.

Tierney frequently appeared in the fan press with his cartoons, many contributed to zines in the Esoteric Order of Dagon amateur press association; Tom Reid issued a 50-copy limited edition of these drawings as Esoterica Mundi in 1976. Artwork by Tierney also appeared in such magazines as Amra, Etchings and Odysseys, The Diversifier, and Crypt of Cthulhu. In the 1970s, Tierney devoted himself as well to casting more artistically serious ceramic figurines in a fantastic style similar to Clark Ashton Smith's famous rock carvings. Some examples can be seen at:

=== Robert E. Howard 'posthumous collaborations' ===
Tierney completed several story fragments and synopses left by Robert E. Howard. In the seventies, Tierney edited two volumes of Howard's works, published in hardcover by Donald M. Grant - Tigers of the Sea (1973) (reprinted in paperback, Zebra Books, 1975) and Hawks of Outremer (1979). In Tigers of the Sea, the title story and "The Temple of Abomination" are posthumous collaborations of Tierney with Howard. Tierney has revealed that "in the Zebra (paperback) edition of Tigers of the Sea, Howard's portion ends in the second paragraph of page 209 with 'Cormac smiled fiercely.". Mine begins with "For the moment..." Thus, as you can see, I'm the one who hauled in all the (Cthulhu) Mythos elements!".

In Hawks of Outremer, the story "The Slave Princess" is the sole posthumous collaboration by Tierney with Howard; Howard wrote the first six chapters of the story, with Tierney supplying the last two.

For Zebra Books, in 1978, Tierney collaborated with David C. Smith on the novel For the Witch of the Mists: Bran Mak Morn, a work utilising the Robert E. Howard character of Bran Mak Morn, a Pictish king. This novel was reprinted by Ace Books in 1981.

=== Other collaborations: 'Posthumous Collaborations' with Poe and C. A. Smith; others ===
Apart from the 'posthumous collaborations' with Robert E. Howard listed above, Tierney has also posthumously collaborated with Clark Ashton Smith ("Utressor" in Robert M. Price, ed. The Book of Eibon (Chaosium, 2002)) and with Edgar Allan Poe ("The Light-House" in Nyctalops 14 (March 1978) and reprinted in Etchings & Odysseys 2 (May 1983)).

Philip Rahman's brother, Glenn Rahman, urged Tierney to collaborate with him on The Gardens of Lucullus, which eventually appeared in 2001.

Tierney has also collaborated on short fiction with authors including Laurence J. Cornford and Robert M. Price (see Simon of Gitta series below).

He has collaborated on poetry with Dale C. Donaldson, Charles Lovecraft, and Leigh Blackmore.

== Later career: 1980s to 21st century ==
In 1981, Tierney returned to Mason City to take care of his mother, Margaret, now deceased. That year, Arkham House published his volume of weird verse, Collected Poems (Richard L. Tierney) including the poems from the 1975 verse collection Dreams and Damnations, along with much other weird verse of the period, from magazines such as The Diversifier, Literary Magazine of Fantasy and Terror, Ambrosia, Dark Messenger Reader, Myrrdin, Fantasy Crossroads and others. Critic S. T. Joshi has said Collected Poems "established Tierney as one of the leading weird poets of his generation." Joshi has commented that some of the poems feature the misanthropic bitterness of Ambrose Bierce. Literary historian Don Herron has stated that the collection presents Tierney as "one of the most technically accomplished sonneteers of his generation, able to bring rhyming forms to bear on his own concerns, such as the especially nihilistic concluding poem "To the Hydrogen Bomb". Tierney found this period of living rent-free with his mother highly productive for his writing, and it was during this time he wrote his novels The House of the Toad, Drums of Chaos and many of the Simon of Gitta stories.

=== Red Sonja series ===
In the early 1980s, for Ace Books, with his frequent collaborator David C. Smith, Tierney co-authored a series of six novels loosely based on another Robert E. Howard character, Red Sonya of Rogatino. Red Sonya had featured in Robert E. Howard's short story "The Shadow of the Vulture" (The Magic Carpet, January 1934), which Roy Thomas rewrote as a Conan story for Marvel Comics Conan the Barbarian #23 (1973), changing the spelling of the heroine's name to Red Sonja. Thomas also somewhat based Red Sonja on another Howard character, Dark Agnes de Chastillon, a swordswoman of 16th-century France who wars against the Turks in Eastern Europe. For the Red Sonja series, Tierney and Smith were paid $1,000 per book and set the stories in the Hyborian Age 15,000 years ago. Ace Books published the series from 1981 to 1983.

As to which work was Smith's and which Tierney's, in an interview with Robert M. Price, Tierney commented: "No-one could ever unravel Dave's work from mine. We'd toss ideas back and forth and come up with a basic plot. Then Dave would rattle off a first draft as fast as he could. I'd revise this to suit myself, often rewriting extensive sections, sometimes changing the plotline altogether. The time involved worked out surprisingly close to 50/50, Dave and I spending about two months apiece per novel."

An omnibus collecting all six Red Sonja novels under the title ''The Collected Chronicles of Red Sonja'' is due to be published by Orbit Books in early 2027.

=== The House of the Toad ===
In the late 1970s, Tierney was contacted by editor Philip Rahman (publisher of the Fedogan & Bremer line) who had read Tierney's tale "From Beyond the Stars" (which takes place in NE Iowa), in Kirby McCauley's anthology Night Chills (1975), The two became friends and eventually he published Tierney's Cthulhu Mythos novel The House of the Toad (1993), which is set in modern-day Iowa along the Mississippi River in the Quad Cities region.

=== Simon Magus/Simon of Gitta series ===
A long-running series of stories (begun in the late-1970s and culminating in 2008 with the novel The Drums of Chaos) by Tierney features Simon of Gitta, a character based on the Gnostic heresiarch Simon Magus.

The first collection of these tales was The Scroll of Thoth: Twelves Tales of the Cthulhu Mythos, edited with an introduction and story notes by Robert M. Price (Chaosium, 1997). An expanded edition has been issued Sorcery Against Caesar by Richard L. Tierney and divers hands, edited by Edward Stasheff. (Edgewood, NM: Pickman's Press, 2020). The expanded edition includes 16 stories and a poem, "Vengeance Quest." Price's Introduction from The Scroll of Thoth is included in abridged form; his original story notes are reprinted for the tales from The Scroll of Thoth, while Edward Stasheff provides story notes for the other tales.

The Biblical figure of Simon Magus is a great figure in the Western mystery tradition. A meticulous researcher, Tierney studied the Roman era and Gnosticism for this series featuring the magician-warrior as a sword-and-sorcery hero. Simon of Gitta also features in Tierney's novels The Gardens of Lucullus (with Glenn Rahman), The Drums of Chaos and The Path of The Dragon (with Glenn Rahman).

Simon is a Samaritan ex-gladiator whose sorcerous abilities allow him to survive encounters with an array of evil priests, emperors, and hideous creatures. His quest for his true love Helen drives Simon and plays an instrumental part in the tales. Some of the stories pay tribute to H. P. Lovecraft, while a story such as "The Blade of the Slayer" is a tribute to Karl Edward Wagner's tales of the swordsman Kane. Magus meets up with Shub-Niggurath (the evil goddess), searches for the Ring of Set, and has several other dark adventures.

The Simon of Gitta stories have been described by fantasy historian Steven Tompkins as combining sword-and-sorcery fiction with weird fiction.

Tierney has commented: "All these tales combine Gnosticism and other first-century elements with overtones of the Hyborian Age and the Cthulhu Mythos. Incidentally, I originally pictured Simon as he was played by Jack Palance in The Silver Chalice. However, it's been so many years since I've seen that film that my memory has slipped. I think I now visualize Simon as someone about halfway between Jack and the Marvel Comics version of Conan."

=== The Drums of Chaos ===
The Drums of Chaos (2008) is the author's magnum opus: an epic alternate history dark fantasy Cthulhu Mythos novel featuring Tierney's best-known characters, Simon of Gitta and John Taggart. Set in the Holy Land during the time of the First century Roman Empire during the ministry of Jesus of Nazareth, Simon of Gitta is on a mission to avenge the deaths of his parents, seeking revenge in blood against the Roman officials who committed the murders. As he travels the Holy Lands with his mentor Dositheus, and their student Menander, they become entangled in a complex plot designed to call down a monstrous alien entity to herald a new aeon on Earth. John Taggart, the time traveler from Tierney's The Winds of Zarr becomes involved with Simon of Gitta, as their separate quests converge toward a common goal of saving the very Earth. Cover art for the volume is by Dave Carson.

The novel was reissued by Pickman's Press in late 2021.

== Later work : 2010–2022 ==
Tierney continued to publish weird verse after the turn of the millennium, with the volume Savage Menace and Other Poems of Horror (2010) collecting all his verse subsequent to Collected Poems. In the 1980s he collaborated on two poems, "The Coming of Juss" and "The Kiss of Elf-Queen," with Dale C. Donaldson. He also collaborated on verse with poets including the Australians Charles Lovecraft and Leigh Blackmore.

Robert M. Price gives an audio reading of Tierney's poem "Petition: To Tsathoggua" on the audio CD Strange Aeons (UK: Rainfall Records, 2001).

Tierney's prose poem "Autumn Chill" is included in Stephen Jones (ed), Mammoth Book of Best New Horror 22 (Robinson, 2011) - only the second poem to ever appear in this horror anthology series. It is also included in Mammoth Books Presents Unexpected Encounters, an e-book containing four of the works from the Robinson anthology. The work can also be found online in an audio reading by fan Will Hart.

Tierney was a longtime member of the Unitarians. He stated that he found writing a chore but was sometimes inspired by listening to classical music or film scores.

In late 2020, Tierney suffered a stroke which caused some numbness to the right side of his body but that did not affect his mental acuity. He also caught but recovered from the COVID-19 virus. He lived in Mason City, Iowa and spent the last few years of his life in Good Shepherd Nursing Home. His papers are now held at the Library of the University of Iowa.

An expanded edition of Savage Menace and Other Poems is forthcoming from P'rea Press.

Prior to his death, Tierney resumed work on the collaborative Simon of Gitta novel Glenn Rahman, The Path of the Dragon, which was begun in the 1990s. It was published after Tierney's death, in January 2025.

With Tierney's permission, Robert M. Price wrote two further stories in the Simon of Gitta series, which have been published in volumes of Price's Flashing Swords anthology series.

== Personal life ==
Tierney was a lifelong bachelor. He died on February 1, 2022, at the age of 85.

== Awards ==
At Arcana 23 (convention), held Oct 10–12, 1993, Tierney was the recipient of the 1993 Minnesota Fantasy Award, given annually at the Arcana (convention) (the convention known until 1987 as 'MinnCon').

Tierney was nominated for Science Fiction Poetry Association Grand Master in 2010.

== Standalone novels ==
- The Winds of Zarr (Silver Scarab Press, 1975; limited edition of 1000 copies). German e-book edition 2018 as Die Winde der Zarr (Apex Fantasy-Klassiker #8). It has been reprinted in The Yog-Sothoth Cycle (Ramble House, 2022).
- For the Witch of the Mists: Bran Mak Morn (Zebra Books, 1978; Ace Books, 1981), with David C. Smith, featuring Robert E. Howard's Bran Mak Morn.
- The House of the Toad (Fedogan and Bremer, 1993). German edition Im Haus der Kröte (Festa, 2008).

== Red Sonja series (with David C. Smith) ==
The heroine is the Hyrkanian warrior Red Sonja. The character is loosely based on Red Sonya created by Robert E. Howard, via the recreation for comics penned by Roy Thomas.

- #1 The Ring of Ikribu (Ace 1981) (Adapted to comics by Roy Thomas and Esteban Maroto in The Savage Sword of Conan issues 230–3). Smith has written an unproduced screenplay for this novel.
- #2 Demon Night (Ace 1982)
- #3 When Hell Laughs (Ace 1982)
- #4 Endithor's Daughter (Ace 1982) (German ed: Endithor's Tochter)
- #5 Against the Prince of Hell (Ace 1983)
- #6 Star of Doom (Ace 1983)

Several of the Red Sonja Ace Books novels were printed two or three times, though Endithor's Daughter saw only one printing.

The Red Sonja novels have been reprinted in German by Heyne Verlag (1990).

== Simon of Gitta series ==
- Scroll of Thoth: Simon Magus and the Great Old Ones: Twelve Tales of the Cthulhu Mythos (Chaosium, 1997), edited with an introduction ("The Sword of the Avatar") and story notes by Robert M. Price, collects all 12 Simon Magus stories solely written to 1997 by Richard L. Tierney. A partial list of original publication locations and dates is on-line at the Crypt of Cthulhu archive.

Not included in this collection were:

- The Wedding of Sheila-Na-Gog (Crypt of Cthulhu #29, 1985), with Glenn Rahman. Available on-line from the Crypt of Cthulhu archive.
- The Throne of Achamoth (Weirdbook #21, 1985), with Robert M. Price. Republished in 1995 in The Azathoth Cycle.
- The Gardens of Lucullus (novel) (Theilman, MN: Sidecar Preservation Society, 2001), (with Glenn Rahman).Introduction by Robert M. Price.
- The Drums of Chaos (Poplar Bluff, MO: Mythos Books, 2008). Introduction - "The Good Samaritan" by Robert M. Price.

An expanded edition of The Scroll of Thoth has been issued as Sorcery Against Caesar: The Complete Simon of Gitta Short Stories by Richard L. Tierney and Divers Hands, edited by Edward Stasheff. (Edgewood, NM: Pickman's Press, 2020). The expanded edition includes all 16 Simon of Gitta stories, including two published after The Scroll of Thoth appeared - "The Emerald Tablet" and "The Secret of Nephren-Ka") and a poem, "Vengeance Quest." Price's Introduction from The Scroll of Thoth is included in abridged form; his original story notes are reprinted for the tales from The Scroll of Thoth, while Edward Stasheff provides story notes for the other tales.

== Short stories ==
- Tigers of the Sea (Donald M. Grant, 1973; Zebra Books, 1975), Two of the four stories in this collection of tales about the pirate Cormac Mac Art, invented by Robert E. Howard, are posthumous collaborations by Tierney with Howard. These are the title story, and "The Temple of Abomination." Tierney also includes Cthulhu Mythos elements in the story "The Temple of Abomination", for example, Shoggoths and star-headed Old Ones.

== Poetry ==
- Dreams and Damnations: Poems (Madison, WI: The Strange Co., 1975). Pp. 82. Limited ed, 100 copies. Illustrated by James Faulkenberg.
- Collected Poems: Nightmares and Visions (Arkham House, 1981). 1030 copies. Illustrated by Jason Van Hollander. The volume is dedicated to Donald Sidney-Fryer.
- The Blob That Gobbled Abdul and Other Poems and Songs (Mason City: Sidecar Preservation Society, 2000, rpt 2002). Limited to 100, and 50 numbered copies. Intro by Ramsey Campbell. Pp. 20, and 24. Reprint, 2002.
- Savage Menace and Other Poems of Horror (P'rea Press, 2010). Preface by S.T. Joshi. Illustrated by Andrew J McKiernan. Pp. 132. ISBN 978-0-9804625-5-5. 100 copies of this edition were printed in hardcover as a numbered limited edition. The volume is dedicated to Charles Lovecraft.

Since the publication of Savage Menace and Other Poems (2010), Tierney's weird verse has primarily been published in the journal Spectral Realms, though poems have also appeared in Cyaegha, Weird Fiction Review and Midnight Echo. Two poems have appeared in anthologies - Anno-Klarkash-Ton edited by Glyn Owen Barrass and Frederick J. Mayer; and The Mammoth Book of the Year's Best Horror No 22, edited by Stephen Jones.

== Special Magazine Issues devoted to Tierney ==
- Crypt of Cthulhu, Vol 3, No 8 (Whole number 24) (Lammas 1984). Contains two novelettes, two poems, an interview with Tierney by Robert M. Price, and a Chronology and Bibliography of the Simon of Gitta stories.
- Crypt of Cthulhu Vol 13, No 2 (Whole number 86) (Eastertide 1994). 68 pp. Contains six early stories by Tierney including the previously unpublished "The Dream" and an excerpt from the then-unpublished novel The Drums of Chaos, with three poems, of which "The Contemplative Sphinx" is revised from its previous appearance and "Garden-Girdled Babylon" is previously unpublished.
- Spectral Realms No 17 (Summer 2022). Dedicated to the memory of Richard Tierney. Includes a previously unpublished poem by Tierney ("Slouching Towards Yuggoth") and tribute/memorial verse by Leigh Blackmore and Charles Lovecraft.
