= Minicon =

Science fiction and fantasy convention in the US

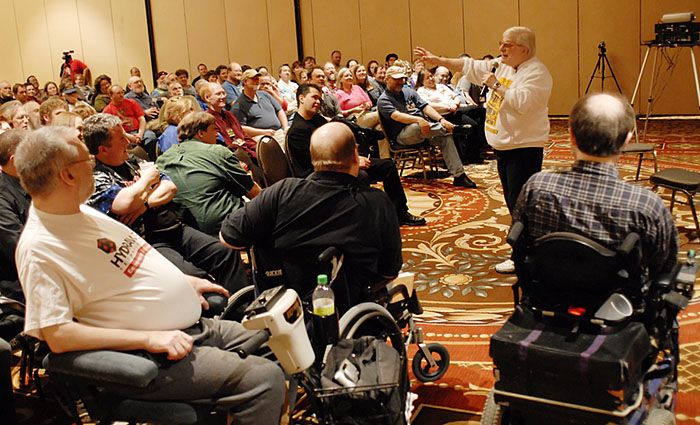
- Harlan Ellison speaking at Minicon 41
- Status: Active
- Genre: Science fiction/fantasy
- Venue: DoubleTree by Hilton Hotel Bloomington
- Location: Bloomington, Minnesota
- Coordinates: 44°51′42″N 93°21′10″W
- Country: United States
- Inaugurated: 1968
- Attendance: 400–700
- Organizer: Minnesota Science Fiction Society
- Filing status: Non-profit
- Website: www.mnstf.org/minicon/

Minicon is a science fiction and fantasy convention in Minneapolis usually held on Easter weekend. Started in 1968 and running approximately annually since then, it is one of the oldest science fiction conventions in the midwest United States. It is run by the Minnesota Science Fiction Society, a non-profit organization that is "dedicated to furthering the appreciation of science fiction and fantasy literature".

Minicon has had many guests of honor over the years, including Gordon R. Dickson, Poul Anderson, Clifford D. Simak, Lester del Rey, Frederik Pohl, Octavia E. Butler, Harlan Ellison, Larry Niven, and Terry Pratchett.

Minicon should not be confused with MinnCon, a dark fantasy/horror convention founded in 1971 by fans living in St. Paul, Minnesota. MinnCon changed its name to Arcana in 1988 to avoid confusion but many area fans still refer to the convention by its older name. The term "minicon" is often used informally in science fiction circles for any small convention.

== Features ==
Staples of modern Minicons are:

- Several tracks of panel discussions
- Readings
- Gaming, formal and informal
- The Bozo Bus Tribune, convention newsletter
- Art show
- Dealers room
- Kids' programming
- Science room
- Filk and folk music
- Consuite and bar
- Parties

== History ==
The first Minicon was held on 6 January 1968 in Coffman Union at the University of Minnesota and had approximately 60 attendees. In all subsequent years it was held in area hotels. Attendance grew fairly steadily for many years, culminating in a series of conventions that drew over 3000 people and used as many as 4 hotels. However, in 1999, Minicon downscaled dramatically due to a feeling among some organizers that it had strayed too far from its roots and had become unmanageable. Recent Minicons have had between 400 and 700 attendees.

Around the time that Minicon reduced its size, some other conventions sprang up in the area, including CONvergence and MarsCon.

== Recent and upcoming conventions ==
Minicon 57 was held on Easter weekend 2024, March 29-31, at the DoubleTree Park Place hotel in St. Louis Park, Minnesota. It featured guests of honor author & illustrator Ursula Vernon (a.k.a. T. Kingfisher), musician Tim Griffin, and archivist Jeremy Brett. It also featured Japanese scholar Jefferey Angles. There were a total of 518 attendees.

Minicon 58 will be held over Easter weekend 2025, April 18-20. It will be the first Minicon at the DoubleTree Bloomington hotel in Bloomington, Minnesota since Minicon 52. This hotel has been the location of 27 previous Minicons, more than any other hotel. It will feature author Wesley Chu, musicians Eric and Jen Distad of The Faithful Sidekicks as guests of honor as well as Michael Busch as a featured astronomer.
