= Fedogan & Bremer =

American specialty small press

- Founded: 1985
- Founder: Philip Rahman and Dennis Weiler
- Country of origin: United States
- Headquarters location: Minneapolis, Minnesota
- Publication types: Books
- Fiction genres: weird fiction
- Official website: www.fedoganandbremer.com

Fedogan & Bremer is a weird fiction specialty publishing house founded in Minneapolis, Minnesota in 1985 by Philip Rahman and Dennis Weiler. The name comes from the nicknames of the two founders when they were in college.

The first Fedogan and Bremer project was a commercial cassette recording of a reading of H.P. Lovecraft's "Fungi From Yuggoth", released in 1987. A remastered CD version was released in the 1990s, and the work has been extensively pirated. Currently, it is not available, but a re-release is planned.

Arkham House had announced the forthcoming publication of Colossus by Donald Wandrei as early as 1965. However, it remained unpublished into the 1980s. Philip Rahman approached the Wandrei estate with the hopes of publishing the collection. While no manuscript nor proposed contents could be found, Rahman and Weiler went forward and published a collection using the same title as the unpublished Arkham House collection.

Fedogan and Bremer continued to publish the sorts of works that were published by Arkham House in the sixties under August Derleth's direction. Fedogan & Bremer books were distributed by DreamHaven Books in Minneapolis for many years. They distributed via Arkham House until 2011, when Arkham House temporarily ceased operations.

Some Fedogan and Bremer titles have been issued in limited as well as in trade editions.

Fedogan and Bremer became inactive from 2006 to 2011 due to personal troubles of the publisher, but never formally announced their closure. The announced project Dead Titans, Waken!, a variant version of Donald Wandrei's novel The Web of Easter Island edited for F&B by S.T. Joshi was purchased by Centipede Press and released as a Limited edition only, in 2011.

Following the sudden death of Mr. Rahman 7/23/2011, the business reorganized. The press announced plans to resume production, and distribution arrangements are in place to sell their other titles still in print. Worlds of Cthulhu, a Lovecraftian collection edited by Robert M. Price, was released in 2012, followed by Weirder Shadows Over Innsmouth in 2013, and two more titles announced for 2014.

== Imprints ==
In 1996, with the publication of The Last Pin, by Howard Wandrei, Fedogan & Bremer launched a subsidiary imprint, F & B Mystery. The imprint focuses on mystery and detective fiction. Since title pages list the publisher simply as "F & B Mystery," this has generated some confusion among librarians and bibliographers.

== Awards ==
In 1998, Fedogan & Bremer won a World Fantasy Award, Special Award - Non-Professional, for book publishing.

== Works published by Fedogan & Bremer ==
- Fungi From Yuggoth (Cassette audio recording) by H.P. Lovecraft (1987)
- Colossus, by Donald Wandrei (1989)
- The Black Death, by Basil Copper (1991)
- Tales of the Lovecraft Mythos, edited by Robert M. Price (1992)
- The House of the Toad, by Richard L. Tierney (1993)
- The Exploits of Solar Pons, by Basil Copper (1993)
- The Early Fears, by Robert Bloch (1994)
- Smoke of the Snake, by Carl Jacobi (1994)
- Shadows Over Innsmouth, edited by Stephen Jones (1994)
- Death Stalks the Night, by Hugh B. Cave (1995). Originally to have been published as the fifth volume from Karl Edward Wagner's Carcosa publishing house. The Carcosa edition did not eventuate due to the intervening death of illustrator Lee Brown Coye. The F&B edition contains all the illustrations that were completed for the volume by Coye prior to his death.
- The Adventure of the Singular Sandwich, by Basil Copper (1995)
- The Recollections of Solar Pons, by Basil Copper (1995)
- Three Tales, by Howard Wandrei (1995)
- Time Burial, by Howard Wandrei (1995)
- The New Lovecraft Circle, edited by Robert M. Price (1996)
- Before…12:01…and After, by Richard A. Lupoff (1996)
- Don't Dream, by Donald Wandrei (1997)
- The Door Below, by Hugh B. Cave (1997)
- The Vampire Stories of R. Chetwynd-Hayes, by R. Chetwynd-Hayes (1997)
- Exorcisms and Ecstasies, by Karl Edward Wagner (1997)
- The Sand Dwellers, by Adam Niswander (1998)
- A Coven of Vampires, by Brian Lumley (1998)
- Whispers in the Night, by Basil Copper (1999)
- Colossus, by Donald Wandrei (1999, expanded contents from the 1989 edition)
- Farewell to Earth—The Original Ending, by Donald Wandrei (1999)
- Acolytes of Cthulhu, edited by Robert M. Price (2001)
- The Eerie Mr. Murphy, by Howard Wandrei (2003)
- Weird Shadows Over Innsmouth, edited by Stephen Jones (2005)
- Worlds of Cthulhu, edited by Robert M. Price (2012)
- Weirder Shadows Over Innsmouth, edited by Stephen Jones (2013)
- Ana Kai Tangata, by Scott Nicolay (2014)
- Searchers After Horror, edited by S. T. Joshi (2014)
- Awaiting Strange Gods, by Darrell Schweitzer (2015)
- Fungi From Yuggoth (CD audio recording) by H.P. Lovecraft (2015)
- The Madness of Dr. Caligari, edited by Joseph S. Pulver (2016)
- Darkness, My Old Friend, by John Pelan & Ramsey Campbell (2016)

== Works published by F & B Mystery ==
- The Last Pin, by Howard Wandrei (1996)
- Saith the Lord, by Howard Wandrei (1996)
- Dark Detectives, edited by Stephen Jones (1999)
- Bottled in Blonde, by Hugh B. Cave (2000)
- Frost, by Donald Wandrei (2000)
- Three Mysteries, by Donald Wandrei (2000)
