= Donald Wandrei =

American writer, poet and editor

- Donald Wandrei, date unknown
- Born: Donald Albert Wandrei; April 20, 1908; Saint Paul, Minnesota, U.S.
- Died: October 15, 1987 (aged 79); Saint Paul, Minnesota, U.S.
- Occupations: Writer; poet; editor
- Relatives: Howard Wandrei (brother)
- Writing career
- Genres: Fantasy, science fiction, weird fiction, mystery fiction

Donald Albert Wandrei (20 April 1908 – 15 October 1987) was an American science fiction, fantasy and weird fiction writer, poet and editor. He was the older brother of science fiction writer and artist Howard Wandrei. He had fourteen stories in Weird Tales, another sixteen in Astounding Stories, plus a few in other magazines including Esquire. Wandrei was the co-founder (with August Derleth) of the prestigious fantasy/horror publishing house Arkham House.

== Biography ==
=== Early life ===
Wandrei was born in Saint Paul, Minnesota. All of his grandparents were early Minnesota settlers. Donald's father, Albert Christian Wandrei, became chief editor of West Publishing Company, America's leading publisher of law books. Donald grew up in his parents' house at 1152 Portland Ave, St Paul and lived there most of his life save for a stint in the Army and occasional sojourns in New York and Hollywood. Donald loved frequent rambles in the woods along the Minnesota River; it was Wandrei who later taught August Derleth the fine art of morel hunting.

=== 1920s ===
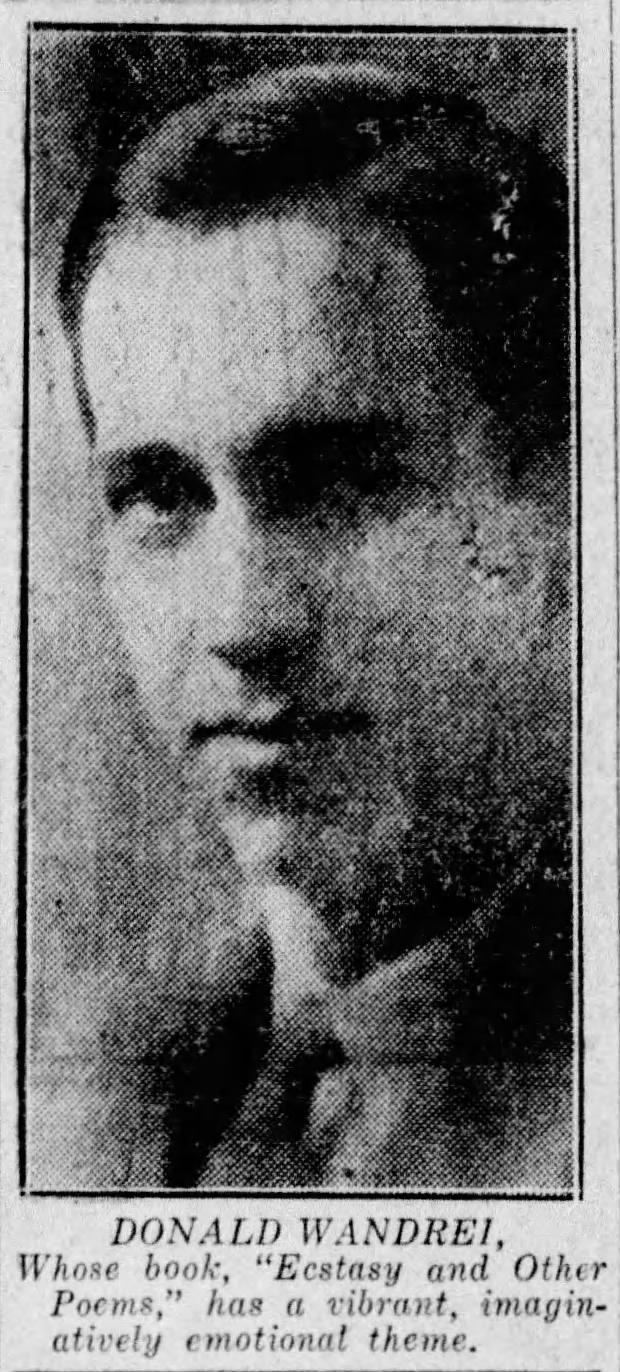
A 1928 photograph of Donald Wandrei

Wandrei attended Central High in St Paul from 1921 to 1924, during which he published short compositions in the school newspaper and avidly read the magazine Science and Invention. In 1923, he began work part-time as a "page-boy" in the Circulation Room of the Saint Paul Public Library, filling reader's requests for books from the storage stacks; this expanded his access to, and reading of, a wide variety of literature. In 1923 and 1924, Wandrei also worked evenings at the Hill Reference Library. He attended the University of Minnesota. While there, he was a student editor and regular columnist on the student newspaper The Minnesota Daily and was also associated with the Minnesota Quarterly Magazine, as well as contributing pieces (often unsigned or pseudonymous) to the campus humour magazine Ski-U-Mah, which was edited by classmate Carl Jacobi. At that time he was enormously influenced by a reading of Arthur Machen's novel The Hill of Dreams. Wandrei graduated in 1928, with a BA in English.

At the age of 16, Wandrei completed his short story "The Red Brain", in which a mysterious Cosmic Dust sweeps through the universe, obliterating the stars. Only Antares, inhabited by a race of viscous Brains, survives – and this last remnant of universal sentience entrusts its fate to the unique, laboratory-created Red Brain in a compelling fable that leaves behind the concerns of human aquarium to revel in the cosmos and the ultimate terror waiting there.

Wandrei started writing in 1926 and his writing career took off around 1932. In late 1927 he hitchhiked from Minnesota to Rhode Island to visit H.P. Lovecraft. Lovecraft conducted him on a grand antiquarian tour of Providence and then on to similar tours in Boston, Salem and Marblehead. There was also an excursion to Warren, Rhode Island, later made famous by Wandrei's reminiscences in the Arkham House volume Marginalia (1944) during which Wandrei, Lovecraft and James Ferdinand Morton each sampled twenty-eight different flavors of ice cream at Maxfield's ice-cream parlour.

In 1925, Wandrei gave Clark Ashton Smith $50 so the Auburn poet could see Sandalwood through the press.

Wandrei's first book, begun at age 18 and published when he was but 20, was the poetry volume Ecstasy & Other Poems which was published by W. Paul Cook's The Recluse Press in 1928. The book's verse shows homage to Clark Ashton Smith and to Smith's poetic mentor George Sterling.

=== 1930s including co-founding Arkham House ===
Wandrei was active in pulp magazines until the late 1930s. He was a member of the "Lovecraft Circle", as a friend and protégé of H. P. Lovecraft, corresponding with other members of the circle (Frank Belknap Long, Clark Ashton Smith, etc.). Wandrei personally made the case for Weird Tales to publish Lovecraft's "The Call of Cthulhu" telling Farnsworth Wright that unless he published the tale, Lovecraft would look for other magazines to submit stories to.

As an accomplished poet, Wandrei was the first to write a series of sonnets for Weird Tales, "Sonnets of the Midnight Hours". Lovecraft liked the idea so much, he embarked on his own series, Fungi from Yuggoth. Robert E. Howard also wrote his own series with "Sonnets out of Bedlam".

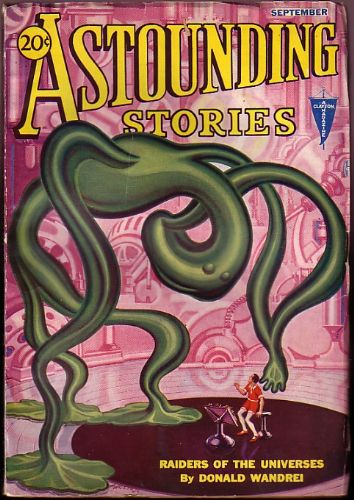
Wandrei's novelette "Raiders of the Universes" was the cover story in the September 1932 Astounding Stories

Wandrei's second book (and second book of verse) was Dark Odyssey (Webb Publishing Co, 1931) illustrated with five illustrations by his brother Howard Wandrei.

Wandrei's only full-length fantastic novel, Dead Titans, Waken!, written in 1932, was rejected successively by three publishers – Harpers, Kendall and John Day – and finally shelved indefinitely by its author. However it was eventually destined to be published in a heavily revised version in 1948 by Arkham House as The Web of Easter Island. The original version was scheduled to be published in the late 1990s by weird fiction specialty publishing house Fedogan and Bremer but due to the dormancy of F&B, the edition was held up. Re-edited by S.T. Joshi, it was finally published by Centipede Press in a limited edition of 300 copies in March 2012. The volume includes Wandrei's mainstream novel "Invisible Sun". Fedogan and Bremer eventually issued a paperback edition of the two-novel omnibus in 2017.

During 1933, Wandrei lived in a studio apartment in New York that was within easy walking distance of the offices of Street & Smith, who published Astounding Stories, so that Wandrei could easily bring in a new story by hand. His story "Colossus" was the first "thought variant" story (stories based on some new or not-yet-overworked idea such as other dimensions or the timetravel paradox), and helped revive the fortunes of Astounding under the editorship of his editorial mentor, F. Orlin Tremaine.

During the 1930s, Wandrei wrote two more (non-fantastic) novels and several plays, one a collaboration with his brother Howard but none were published although they were submitted to various publishers and agents.

At this period Wandrei also broke into the crime pulps with stories of his detective I.V. Frost published in such magazines as Clues Detective Stories (Half of these are gathered in Frost (2000)) and others for Black Mask. He also broke into the 'slicks' with stories published in Esquire.

Wandrei contributed two stories to the Cthulhu Mythos: "The Fire Vampires" (1933) and "The Tree-Men of M'Bwa" (1933).

In 1939, Wandrei and August Derleth later co-founded the publishing house Arkham House to keep Lovecraft's legacy alive, an action for which Wandrei is perhaps better remembered than for his own fiction. Wandrei and Derleth co-edited the omnibus collections The Outsider and Others and Beyond the Wall of Sleep. Much of the editorial work on Lovecraft's Selected Letters series (published by Arkham House in five volumes between 1964 and 1976) was performed by Wandrei. Wandrei's interest in Arkham House centred primarily on seeing the Lovecraft writings into print; it was Derleth who brought a wider program to the press when Wandrei entered the army in 1942.

=== 1940s ===
Wandrei wrote some outlines for Gang Busters and other comic books in the 1940s, and also attempted writing song lyrics in Hollywood. After World War II, he continued writing speculative fiction stories, although at a greatly reduced rate. Some of his stories were adapted for the comic book Weird Science – "Divide and Conquer" (issue 6), based on his "A Scientist Divides", and "Monster from the Fourth Dimension" (issue 7), based on "A Monster from Nowhere".

The author note on Wandrei's story collection (his first prose volume), The Eye and the Finger (1944), says: "An inveterate traveler, he has ranged from New York to Hollywood, and from Quebec to New Orleans, with extensions to Panama and Cuba" and also notes that his active hobby was photography. Furthermore, "he prefers to work at night, and has often written a complete story in a single night. Some of his tales have originated in the form of dreams, of which he says he has a hair-raising variety, and have been written with few changes."

Wandrei served almost four years with the U.S. Army in World War II, and as a technical sergeant, Third Battalion, 259th Infantry, 65th Division, a unit of General Patton's famous Third Army, took part in the final drive across Germany into Austria – the Rhineland and Central Europe campaigns.

=== 1950s ===
Post-World War II, Wandrei's fiction output dropped considerably. His time with the army had left him little time to write, and although he worked on several novels and plays, none of these was published.

=== 1960s ===
In 1964, Arkham House published Wandrei's third book of poetry, Poems for Midnight. This volume, like his earlier Dark Odyssey, was supplemented with four pen-and-ink illustrations by his brother Howard Wandrei. The complete sonnet sequence "Sonnets of the Midnight Hours" is included, along with many other poems dating back as far as 1926 and including several reprints from both his earlier volumes of verse. Some of the early poems were revised radically for their appearance in Poems for Midnight

In 1965, Arkham House published Wandrei's second collection of short stories, Strange Harvest, which gathered 17 tales published in Weird Tales, Astounding Stories and Fantasy Magazine. The jacket drawing was by the author's brother, Howard Wandrei, who had died in 1956.

In 1967, a new tale, "The Crater", appeared in the Arkham House anthology Travellers by Night.

Wandrei occupied his time editing Lovecraft's Selected Letters, whose first two volumes appeared successively in 1965 and 1968. Volume Three followed in 1971, and Volumes 4 and 5 eventually reached print in 1976.

=== 1970s ===
In the 1970s Wandrei commenced a long and tedious process of litigation against Arkham House, the publishing company he had helped to found. After August Derleth's death in 1971, Donald Wandrei briefly acted as editorial director, but declined to resume his interest in the firm permanently.

1971 saw a new original tale from Wandrei, "Requiem for Mankind", which appeared in the Arkham House anthology Dark Things.

Wandrei came in frequent contact during the 1970s with novelist and poet Richard L. Tierney, a Twin Cities resident for nine years in the 1970s.

Though Wandrei had, for reasons unknown, abandoned the writing of poetry around 1934, he wrote four poems in 1977 and 1978 which he circulated amongst friends and colleagues as limited state broadsides.

Wandrei circulated iconoclastic letter-essays that denounced many of the organized forces behind the modern fantasy movement – a movement he, as a founder of Arkham House, was instrumental in setting motion.

=== 1980s ===
In 1984, Wandrei was awarded the World Fantasy Award for Life Achievement. However, he refused to accept the award because he felt that the bust representing the award was a demeaning caricature of Lovecraft, whom he had known personally.

Wandrei died in St. Paul in 1987.

In 1976, Philip Rahman had met Wandrei at a convention and the two became friends. Three years after Wandrei's death in 1987, Rahman and his mostly silent partner Dennis Weiler founded the publishing firm of Fedogan and Bremer to issue work by Donald and Howard Wandrei as well as other classic pulp writers.

== Awards ==
- World Fantasy Award for Life Achievement (1984) (Wandrei refused to accept the award)

== Bibliography ==
=== Novels ===
- The Web of Easter Island (1948)
- Dead Titans, Waken!/ Invisible Sun (Centipede Press, hardcover, 2012; Fedogan & Bremer, trade paperback, 2017). Because this is an omnibus of two novels, it is also listed under Collections below.

=== Collections ===
- The Eye and the Finger (Arkham House, 1944)
- Strange Harvest (Arkham House, 1965)
- Colossus (Philip J Rahman & Dennis E Weiler, eds. Fedogan & Bremer, 1989) ISBN 1-878252-00-3 An expanded 2nd ed. was issued in 1999, adding two stories ("A Stranger Passes" & "If"), plus an updated biographical intro by Richard L. Tierney, a photo gallery. A Selected Bibliography by D.H. Olson which appeared in the first edition was omitted from the 2nd ed. 2nd ed ISBN 1-878252-45-3. A bonus booklet called "Farewell to Earth: The Original Ending" (no ISBN) was printed in an edition of only 75 copies and given to some purchasers of the 2nd ed.
- Don't Dream: The Collected Fantasy and Horror of Donald Wandrei (Philip J Rahman & Dennis E Weiler, eds. Fedogan & Bremer, 1997) ISBN 1-878252-27-5
- Frost (F & B Mystery, 2000) ISBN 1-878252-42-9
- Three Mysteries (F & B Mystery, 2000) OCLC 51309341 100 copies were included with the deluxe edition of Wandrei's collection Frost.
- Dead Titans, Waken! (Fedogan and Bremer, 2017). ISBN 978-1-878252-87-6 Despite the main title, this edition is in fact an omnibus of Dead Titans, Waken! (the original title for the early version of The Web of Easter Island) and the mainstream novel Invisible Sun. It includes an Afterword and Notes by S.T. Joshi. For the preceding Centipede Press limited edition of Dead Titans, Waken!/Invisible Sun (2003), see The Web of Easter Island
- The Complete I.V. Frost (Haffner Press, 2021) ISBN 9781893887619

=== Poetry ===
- Ecstasy & Other Poems (Athol, Mass: W. Paul Cook, The Recluse Press, 1928; ltd to 322 copies). Hardcover. Collects 30 poems. Reprinted in entirety in Collected Poems (1988).
- Dark Odyssey (St Paul, MN: Webb Publishing Co, 1931; ltd to 400 copies). Hardcover. Collects 23 poems, with five illustrations by Howard Wandrei. Reprinted in entirety in Collected Poems (1988).
- Poems for Midnight (Arkham House, 1964). Reprinted in entirety in Collected Poems (1988)
- Collected Poems (Necronomicon Press, 1988) – edited by S. T. Joshi; illustrated by Howard Wandrei OCLC 21630466. In addition to reprinting the entire contents of Ecstasy, Dark Odyssey, Poems for Midnight and the poetry section of the anthology Broken Mirrors, this volume includes 29 previously uncollected poems from the pages of Weird Tales and The Minnesota Quarterly as well as four never before published. It also reprints the original Howard Wandrei illustrations from Dark Odyssey and Poems for Midnight. The cover was designed by Robert H. Knox and incorporates two drawings by Howard Wandrei. Despite the title, this volume is entirely superseded by Sanctity and Sin (2008).
- Sanctity and Sin: The Collected Poetry and Prose-Poems of Donald Wandrei (edited by S.T. Joshi; illustrated by Howard Wandrei). Hippocampus Press, 2008. ISBN 0-9771734-9-6. Includes all known poems including prose poems and previously uncollected poems including prose-poems.

=== Letters ===
- Mysteries of Time & Spirit: The Letters of H.P. Lovecraft & Donald Wandrei (S. T. Joshi & David E Schultz, eds.;Night Shade Books, 2002) ISBN 1-892389-49-5

=== Other ===
A Donald Wandrei Miscellany. Ed.D. H. Olson., St Paul, MN: Sidecar Preservation Society, 2001. A sampling of rare fiction, non-fiction, verse, humour and satire. According to the editor: "1st edition (100 copies, 20 bound in boards) was released on Oct 28, 2001 and went out of print on November 12th. A second "corrected" edition (100 copies, pb only) was released in February 2002. For the record the error in the 1st edition (the pbs) was that the prose poem "Ebony and Silver" was printed using an uncorrected text. An errata sheet was added to all copies of that first edition beginning on 10–31–01."
