= Howard Wandrei =

American writer and artist

Howard Elmer Wandrei
- Born: September 24, 1909; Saint Paul, Minnesota
- Died: September 5, 1956 (aged 46); Saint Paul, Minnesota
- Occupations: Artist, short story writer
- Relatives: Donald Wandrei (brother)
- Writing career
- Pen name: H. W. Guernsey, Robert Coley
- Genres: Fantasy, science fiction, horror, mystery

Howard Elmer Wandrei (24 September 1909 – 5 September 1956) was an American artist and writer. He wrote over 200 stories that appeared in the magazines Weird Tales, Astounding, Esquire, Black Mask, and others. Wandrei wrote under his own name and the pseudonyms Robert Coley and H.W. Guernsey.

Wandrei is best remembered for his illustrations, many of which were included in the books of his brother, Donald Wandrei.

In the 1990s, Arkham House, the publishing house co-founded by Donald Wandrei, announced that they would publish several collections of his stories. Fedogan & Bremer has since published several collections of Wandrei's stories using some of the same titles as the proposed Arkham House publications.

== Works ==
- Three Tales (Fedogan & Bremer, 1995)
- Time Burial (Fedogan & Bremer, 1995)
- The Last Pin (F & B Mystery, 1996)
- Saith the Lord (F & B Mystery, 1996) (limited to 250 copies in wrappers; there were also 100 copies hardbound for insertion with the limited edition slipcased state of THE LAST PIN)
- The Eerie Mr. Murphy (Fedogan & Bremer, 2003)
