= The House on the Borderland and Other Novels =

Short novels collection of William Hope Hodgson

- Dust-jacket illustration by Hannes Bok.
- Author: William Hope Hodgson
- Cover artist: Hannes Bok
- Language: English
- Genre: fantasy, horror, Science fiction
- Publisher: Arkham House
- Publication date: 1946
- Publication place: United States
- Media type: Print (Hardback)
- Pages: xi, 639

The House on the Borderland and Other Novels is a collection of short novels by British writer William Hope Hodgson. It was published by Arkham House in 1946 in an edition of 3,014 copies. The collection was reprinted by Gollancz in 2002, with a new introduction by China Miéville, as volume 33 of their Fantasy Masterworks series.

== Contents ==
The House on the Borderland and Other Novels contains the following:

1. "William Hope Hodgson, Master of the Weird and Fantastic" by H.C. Koenig
2. The Boats of the 'Glen Carrig'
3. The House on the Borderland
4. The Ghost Pirates
5. The Night Land
6. "Bibliography", by A. Langley Searles

== Sources ==
- Jaffery, Sheldon (1989). The Arkham House Companion. Mercer Island, WA: Starmont House, Inc. p. 17. ISBN 1-55742-005-X.
- Chalker, Jack L.; Mark Owings (1998). The Science-Fantasy Publishers: A Bibliographic History, 1923-1998. Westminster, MD and Baltimore: Mirage Press, Ltd. p. 29.
- Joshi, S.T. (1999). Sixty Years of Arkham House: A History and Bibliography. Sauk City, WI: Arkham House. p. 34. ISBN 0-87054-176-5.
- Nielsen, Leon (2004). Arkham House Books: A Collector's Guide. Jefferson, NC and London: McFarland & Company, Inc. p. 57. ISBN 0-7864-1785-4.
