= Sargasso Sea Stories =

Group of short stories by William Hope Hodgson

Sargasso Sea Stories are a group of short stories written by English author William Hope Hodgson that are set around the Sargasso Sea. They have been featured in various short story collections, including The Boats of the "Glen Carrig" and Other Nautical Adventures: The Collected Fiction of William Hope Hodgson, Volume 1. In his introduction to this volume, the editor Jeremy Lassen writes:

[These stories] are the kind of stories that helped Hodgson achieve commercial success. These stories were often published in the highest paying fiction markets of his day, and demonstrate his wide-ranging narrative talent... Today's readers of Hodgson may be more familiar with his stunningly original novels of cosmic vision, such as The House on the Borderland or The Night Land, but it is his narratives of the sea that first captured the attention of the reading public. Most importantly, however, it was in the weed-choked Sargasso Sea where Hodgson first began to explore unreality, and the borderlands of human existence.

== "From the Tideless Sea Part One" ==
This story was first published in the United States in April 1906 in The Monthly Story and first published in England in May 1907 in The London Magazine.

This story contains several similarities to Hodgson's novel The Boats of the "Glen Carrig". Both concern a vessel trapped in the Sargasso Sea, which builds a superstructure against attacking creatures; the trapped ship in the novel is the Seabird, while the ship in this story is called the Homebird. The story can be thought of as a shorter but similar tale told from the perspective of a character trapped aboard such a ship.

=== Plot summary ===
A sailing ship happens to fall upon a floating water-cask, well-sealed with pitch and containing a manuscript. The cask is opened and the manuscript is read aloud.

It is the story of the ship Homebird. A terrible storm at sea heavily damages the ship, breaking away all three masts and severely injuring the captain, and leaving it at the mercy of the winds and tides until it is caught in the "cemetery of the oceans", the Sargasso Sea. A group of crew members attempts to free the Homebird but are taken by a giant octopus. The remaining crewmen are also killed, leaving only the narrator, the injured captain, and the captain's daughter. As the captain's health fails, the narrator constructs a superstructure out of wood and pitch-hardened canvas to protect the vessel from the predator. The captain realizes that he will soon die, leaving the narrator alone with his daughter. To protect her honour, the narrator agrees to marry the young woman.

"'Do you -- do you love her?'
"His tone was keenly wistful, and a sense of trouble lurked in his eyes.
"'She will be my wife,' I said, simply; and he nodded.
"'God has dealt strangely with us,' he murmured, presently, as though to himself.
"Abruptly, he bade me tell her to come in.
"And then he married us.
"Three days later, he was dead, and we were alone.

The narrator continues to fortify the ship's defences, and soon finds that his new wife is pregnant. He takes stock of the ship's stores of food and finds that sufficient provisions exist to keep them alive for fifteen to seventeen years.

The narrator of the story within a story concludes by describing his plans to enclose the manuscript in the water-cask and attach it to a balloon, so that the wind will carry it to open water. The narrative returns from the story-within-a-story to describe the present captain's reaction to the story:

"Seventeen years pervisions," he muttered thoughtfully. "An' this 'ere were written sumthin' like twenty-nine years ago!" He nodded his head several times. "Poor creetures!" he exclaimed. "It'd be er long while, Jock -- a long while!"

== "The Finding of the Graiken" ==
A man abuses his friend's trust by taking over his ship and sailing on a mission to the Sargasso Sea to rescue his girlfriend.
