= List of stories by William Hope Hodgson =

This article contains information about the short stories of William Hope Hodgson.

== Standalone stories described elsewhere ==
The following short stories are described in separate articles.

- "A Tropical Horror"
- "The Voice in the Night"
- "The Derelict"
- "Eloi Eloi Lama Sabachthani"

== Miscellaneous stories ==
=== "The Goddess of Death" ===
"The Goddess of Death" was Hodgson's first published story, and appeared in 1904 in Royal Magazine.

A village is terrorized by a number of murders by strangulation, and the chief suspect is a statue of the goddess Kali stolen from a Thugee temple. The narrator is a visitor who believes there must be a rational explanation, but he finds it increasingly difficult to explain what is going on when the town's mysterious 8-foot statue is missing from its base and he sees what looks like the statue itself running through the night, carrying a cloth garotte.

Recruiting a friend to help him, the narrator leads a group to find the statue before it kills again. A volunteer is killed, but the narrator shoots at the statue, which disappears into a lake. Things look hopeless until the narrator consults the private journal of the Colonel who brought the statue from India. He learns of a secret catch in the statue's base which lowers and raises it, and which allows entry into a secret passage. Someone has been living inside the secret passage, and at its end, where the tunnel reaches the lake, he sees what appears to be another statue in the water. As he tries to pull it out, he realizes that it is an enormous "Hindoo" (Hindu) high priest wearing a white gown and a mask to imitate the statue; the bullets in fact did reach their mark and the mysterious man is dead. He was a "high priest" who had come to avenge the destruction of his temple.

=== "Terror of the Water-Tank" ===
This story was first published in 1907 in Blue Book Magazine. Hodgson introduces the story as follows:

Crowning the heights on the outskirts of a certain town on the east coast is a large, iron water-tank from which an isolated row of small villas obtains its supply. The top of this tank has been cemented, and round it have been placed railings, thus making it a splendid "look-out" for any of the townspeople who may choose to promenade upon it. And very popular it was until the strange and terrible happenings of which I have set out to tell.

The "strange and terrible happenings" begin with the discovery of a murder victim on the tank; he died by strangulation. The strangled man is the father of the narrator's fiancee, which leads to the narrator's involvement in the story. A local man named Dr. Tointon has been investigating; he has found that the strangled man's watch and watch chain are missing. The narrator notices that the mud around the tank is undisturbed, indicating that no one passed that way.

No real progress is made until several days later when a policeman who had been patrolling the tank is also found dead; he has been strangled as well. Although witnesses heard the man die, and would have seen anyone leaving the tank via the stairs, the mud beside the tank remains undisturbed. Tointon tells the narrator that he has not yet formed a conclusion, but will speak to him the following day.

The next day comes, but Tointon sends the narrator a note asking him to delay their meeting until late that evening. While waiting, the narrator questions Dufirst, the tank-keeper, a bearded black man whom he considers "an ugly little beast." In Dufirst's cottage the narrator discovers the first strangled man's missing watch and watch chain. The narrator summons the nearby police inspector and has Dufirst arrested. Later that evening we learn that the doctor is still out of town and has become seriously ill.

In the weeks that follow, Dufirst is tried and convicted of the first murder and scheduled for hanging. When Dr. Tointon recovers and returns, he is shocked to learn what has happened, believing that Dufirst is innocent. He assembles a team to investigate the water-tank that evening, bringing along a police constable, a loaded shotgun and several lanterns. Covering the lanterns, they hold a silent vigil on top of the tank. In the dead of night, a "very slight, slurring, crawling sort of noise" is heard. The lanterns are uncovered, and the doctor fires his shotgun.

The constable is found lying on the tank, but he is not dead—he has simply fainted from fright. The perpetrator is a "writhing yellow something, like an eel or a snake... flat as a ribbon." This creature has emerged from the tank, via a pipe, and climbed up onto the railing around the tank. The doctor's belief is confirmed; we learn that when he investigated the original crime he discovered slime on the tank railings and moisture on the collars of the victims. The exact nature of the creature remains a mystery, as its head has been destroyed by the shotgun blast, but the doctor believes that it is an abnormal creature because it developed under "abnormal conditions."

=== "Bullion" ===
This story was first published in 1911 in Everybody's Weekly

A ship is transporting a valuable cargo of gold bullion packed into chests, and stored in a separate locked and sealed room. But when mysterious whispering is heard in the night, an investigation leads the first mate to think he is losing his mind; first chests are missing, and then they aren't!

The narrator, who is the ship's second mate, is aboard "one of the fast clipper-ships running between London and Melbourne at the time of the big gold finds up at Bendigo." The captain, named Reynolds, complains to him of a strange whispering in his cabin, and asks if the second mate will trade cabins with him. The previous captain, Captain Avery, had previously died in the room, of no known cause. Although the second mate agrees to the switch, believing the captain's concern to be nonsense, in a few nights he is hearing a mysterious whispering as well. The ship carries a very valuable cargo of gold bullion, so the mate gives orders to open and examine the special compartment holding the gold, which is positioned just below the captain's cabin in the lazarette. He awakens the captain, and they enter the lazarette and examine the compartment. The whispering can clearly be heard, but again the source of it cannot be found. The second mate and captain open the sealed room, and find that the thirteenth of the sixty chests is missing! However, when the captain leaves and returns with the purser, and they examine the chests again, they are all present and accounted for. No explanation can be found.

A round-the-clock guard is set up. The three officers (the captain and the two mates) take turns sleeping inside the bullion compartment itself, locked in with the gold, while the petty officers keep watch, pacing around the bullion compartment twenty-four hours a day. The guard inside the room is woken every hour to confirm that the chests are all there. When it is time for the narrator to stand guard, he awakens groggily to discover that a number of chests are missing, but believes that he must be dreaming. When he awakens, the chests are all in place. Shortly thereafter, the first mate actually dies during his watch, again of no apparent cause. No explanation can be found, although the strange whispering is heard again.

After the ship docks in London, bank officials come on board to remove the gold. Everything seems normal, and the watch is in place, but when the door into the bullion compartment is opened, the first mate on guard inside is found to be dead, again of no apparent cause. When the bullion is removed, all seems in order, until the bank reports that all of the chests actually contain lead! As additional cargo is unloaded, an especially heavy case arouses the second mate's suspicion, and he has the man operating the crane "accidentally" drop a case. It bursts open, and chests of gold bullion are found. An elaborate plot is revealed, in which conspirators brought aboard identical chests containing lead, stored in other cargo; the special compartment to hold the bullion was built with a sliding door and connection to a secret passage. In the dead of night the thieves gradually swapped the chests. To avoid detection by the guard inside the compartment they used a narcotic gas. Too low a dose allowed the second mate to awaken and see the chests missing; but too high a dose killed the first mate. The same narcotic gas evidently killed the previous captain, who was gassed to keep him from learning too much about the theft going on directly beneath his cabin.

=== "The Mystery of the Water-Logged Ship" ===
This story was first published in 1911 in the Grand Magazine.

A yacht comes perilously close to colliding with a swamped, dismasted, derelict vessel; only the captain's instincts prevent the crash, as he sees a flash of light in the darkness. The source of the light cannot be found, but the yacht's spotlight picks out the derelict. Investigating the vessel, the crew of the yacht decides to tow it, in order to collect money for salvage. They arrange a tow-line, and leave a skeleton crew of four volunteers, together with the bo'sun, aboard. A little later, the captain of the yacht is shocked to discover that the towline is no longer connected and the ship is a considerable distance from the yacht. The crewmen aboard the vessel are gone.

The same scenario plays out again; the second mate leads another group of volunteers, but the line is again found disconnected and the men gone. No explanation is found. The yacht keeps a close watch on the ship all night, and in the morning the crew again boards the derelict and inspects it thoroughly. A half-dozen armed men are left aboard, this time under the direction of the third officer. At dusk the mate's whistle is heard, and there is a loud shouting from the derelict, but by the time the crew of the yacht investigates again, the men are gone.

Finally, the crew of the yacht set up an iron-barred cage on the deck of the derelict, with a group of armed men inside, and they hold a vigil while the yachts hover expectantly nearby, ready to turn their spotlight on the derelict. In the dead of night a strange noise is heard, and the men in the cage fire a gun. The yacht trains its spotlight squarely onto the derelict ship, and the men are astonished to see that the rigging of the derelict ship is full of pirates. In the ensuing gun battle, all the pirates are killed. The derelict is not really flooded; while the upper part of the hold is filled with water and floating timber, it has been retrofitted with an airtight compartment underneath, accessible through the hollow lower masts, and is complete with electric lights, ventilation fans, and motive power. The lost men are found below, bound in chains but unharmed amidst a king's ransom in stolen gold.

=== "The Ghosts of the Glen Doon" ===
This story was first published in 1911 in The Red Magazine.

Another floating derelict is the subject of an investigation because of a mysterious tapping. A brave (or foolhardy) man bets that he can spend the night aboard the allegedly haunted ship. Is the tapping noise produced by the ghosts of the men who drowned when it sank, or is there a more prosaic explanation?

We learn that the iron ship Glen Doon "turned turtle" (flipped upside-down) and trapped ten workers aboard. For twenty-four hours the ship floated upside-down. The tapping of the workers' hammers on the hull led rescuers to attempt to drill holes in the ship, but this just allowed the air to escape faster, and the men were drowned as the ship sank.

Seven months later, the ship was bought at auction and raised, although she then sat idle for another five years. No living soul is aboard her, but in the dead of night mysterious tapping can be heard, allegedly the ghosts of the drowned men. Larry Chaucer, the young son of a wealthy local, wagers that he can spend the night alone aboard the ship unmolested.

He and a number of his friends first climb aboard and investigate; aside from some silt, the ship appears completely empty, yet the faint tapping can be heard, although its precise source cannot be located. As they inspect the ship the tapping ceases. The men withdraw to a boat near the ship and to the dock to listen for trouble, leaving Chaucer aboard to perform his vigil. As they wait, the tapping sound resumes, audible even across the bay. Suddenly the firing of a pistol is heard, and then a scream. The men race for the ship, but the young daredevil can't be found. Only his empty pistol and his lantern remain. As the men explore the hold, a strange sound is heard, as if someone were ascending through the stillness of the hold, but no one can be seen. The men hastily leave the hold.

Days pass, and the police investigate in excruciating detail; Larry Chaucer's wealthy father is involved. The ship is emptied completely; the silt is removed, and the internal bulkheads are removed until the Glen Doon is little more than an iron shell. Nothing is found. Police officers keep watch on board, and patrol-boats are stationed near the hulk, looking for any clue, as fruitless weeks pass. One night the hammering sound starts again, and as armed detectives keep watch on the deck they see:

...a man's head and face, the hair as long as a woman's, and dripping with sea water, so that the cadaverous face showed white and unwholesome from out of the sopping down-hang of the hair. In a minute there followed the body of the strange man, and the sea water ran from his garments, glistening as the moon-breams caught the drops. He came inboard over the rail, making no more noise than a shadow, and paused, swaying with a queer movement full in a patch of moonlight. Then, noiseless, he seemed to glide across the deck in the direction of the dark gape of the open main hatchway.

Although the men try to stop him, and fire at him, the figure disappears into the hold, and no trace of him can be found. Investigation continues. Mechanics are hired to drill holes into the sides of the ship, demonstrating that there are no secret compartments. They even drill into the bottom of the ship, patching the holes with hot lead to prevent the ingress of water. The hollow steel lower masts are investigated as well, and found to be empty. The search looks hopeless until the police inspector discovers a single hair stuck in a nearly invisible metal seam in a hollow mast. A secret door into the mast is discovered and opened. At the bottom of the hollow mast, a secret passage is found, leading down into a shaft that opens into another vessel, made from discarded boilers welded together, suspended below the Glen Doon. In it is a band of counterfeiters stamping coins; this is the source of the mysterious tapping. The miscreants are apprehended. Larry Chaucer presumably met his death at the hands of the counterfeiters.

=== "Mr. Jock Danplank" ===
This story was first published in 1912 in The Red Magazine.

Mr. Jock Danplank, a British citizen who has spent time living in the United States, has come into a substantial inheritance that includes not only money but a cottage complete with gardening and housekeeping staff and a stunningly beautiful garden. But Danplank's deceased uncle neglected to tell anyone just where the money was to be found. Near death, he was heard to mutter "seventy-seven feet due east", but was unable to finish his instructions.

Danplank and his wife, Mary, take possession of the cottage and examining a large, ornate desk, attached to the floor, that was also part of the bequest. During the days and nights that follow, it becomes clear that Danplank's cousin is also trying to locate the money; he repeatedly invades the cottage grounds and angers the aged head gardener by trampling on the flower-beds; he even digs enormous pits on the grounds in the dead of night.

As the story reaches its climax Danplank and his wife arrange a surprise for the cousin. They silently observe him tampering with the ornate table in the cottage, and afterwards, while he and his confederates are digging another deep pit in the gardens, fill the pit with water and photograph him clambering out, covered with mud. The cousin's examinations have given them a clue, and they discover that by putting the table back in its original position they are able to use the compass rose in the desktop to locate the treasure. The story ends with another common Hodgson motif: a snide letter to the cousin, enclosing proofs of the photographs (for potential blackmail or criminal prosecution) and indicating that the treasure has been found.

Hodgson may have intended to introduce Jock Danplank as another recurring character. However, he did not use Danplank again. Sam Moskowitz in his introduction to the story collection Out of the Storm writes that the plot "...provides an inconsequential bit of fiction, interesting only for the clever utilization of photography in the story." (Hodgson was a noted photographer).

=== "The Mystery of Captain Chappel" ===
This story was first published in 1917 in The Red Magazine.

A mysterious murder has taken place. Because the victim was observed leaving a pub and then found dead nearby, only a minute later, having traversed only a short distance on an empty street with high walls on either side, police are baffled. The initial setup is presented as a locked room mystery, in which the murder appears impossible given the circumstances. Cobbler Juk, the uncle of the police officer investigating, is informally recruited, and turns out to be a talented amateur sleuth. A second murder takes place, this time of Saddler Atkins.

The cobbler believes that he knows who will be killed next, and so he and his nephew the police officer stake out the home of Councillor Tomkins, waiting. What they see is quite baffling: a seven-foot creature, emitting disturbing, inhuman noises, observes the councillor, then crashes through a window and attacks him, with the cobbler and constable giving chase. The creature escapes, but Tomkins is dead.

We next join the cobbler in surveillance of a black man, whom they accost outside his home. He fights off the cobbler; in his home the cobbler finds an object, which is not revealed to the reader.

In the conclusion the cobbler explains the whole story: he has uncovered evidence that the three dead men worked together, many years ago, on a ship that was apparently involved in illegal seal poaching. The black man worked for the three, and to guarantee his silence the three cut out his tongue. The black man has been working his revenge, wearing a costume in the shape of a seal head. The cobbler tracked the man by an idiosyncratic habit: while waiting for his victims, he drops the matches that he uses to light his pipe, after tearing them in two and twisting them in a distinct manner. These twisted half-matches were found at the first two crime scenes and also in the floor-sweepings from a local pub.

=== "The Home-Coming of Captain Dan" ===
This story was first published in 1918 in The Red Magazine.

Captain Dan himself is a very colorful character who speaks in a mixture of nautical argot and gutter French.

=== "Merciful Plunder" ===
This story was first published in 1925 in Argosy-Allstory Weekly.

A sea captain named Mellor is carrying out trading in a seaport on the Adriatic coast; the seaport is involved in "the wars so common in the Balkans." Mortar and rifle fire is audible in the distance, but Captain Mellor is more disturbed to hear the horrible sounds of a mass execution of twenty minors, who had been fighting as irregular guerilla warriors, in the town square. Twenty more youths remain locked in the local jail awaiting execution the next morning. Mellor, pretending to support the executions and displaying little sympathy for the youths, gets a tour from a Frenchman. Mellor observes the pitiful condition of the prisoners, and watches as a guard puts out a cigarette against one boy's leg; he also learns the layout of the jail building and the location and number of the guards.

That night, Mellor leads a daring raid. A cliff edge lies behind and above the jail, and with his chief engineer George and two other crewmen, in the dark of night they put into place a spar and pulley to lower the captain and his chief engineer to the jail window. While they are nearly caught, with the help of the boys they manage to remove the window bars with a hacksaw; the boys kill one guard with one of the bars, and the captain manages to incapacitate two others. The boys are removed through the window and spirited away aboard Mellor's ship. The Frenchman never learns by what means the boys have miraculously disappeared, although he remains appalled by Mellor's outward cavalier attitude, telling him "the good God was kinder than you."

=== "The Haunting of the Lady Shannon" ===
The story was first published in 1916 in the Premier Magazine.

A young seaman on board the Lady Shannon, discussing Captain Teller and his cruelty and violent tendencies, encourages the other seamen to stand up to the man. Overhearing the discussion are three apprentices. The fate of another seaman, Toby, at the hands of the captain and second mate is revealed:

"Last trip they treated one of the ordinaries so badly that the poor chap went queer -- silly. Mind you, he acted like a goat and gave both the second mate and the skipper slack; but they knocked all that out of him and some of his brains as well, I believe. Anyway, he went half-dotty before the end of the voyage."

A few days later, Seaman Jones, a vocal advocate of standing up for himself, bites off a plug of tobacco and is noticed by the second mate. He refuses to throw his tobacco overboard and the mate attacks him. They fight, and Jones severely injures the mate. The captain begins shouting and firing his revolver, although he only wounds one man by accident. The first mate also attacks Jones; in the fracas, the captain throws his revolver and accidentally strikes the first mate, who is knocked unconscious. One of the apprentices, Tommy, involuntarily shouts "Hurray!" and is attacked by the captain, who beats him, knocking him unconscious. Jones meanwhile attacks the second mate, and is also knocked unconscious, while the first mate has recovered. At the end of the complicated fracas Tommy, the second mate, and Jones are all unconscious. The second mate recovers with the administration of whiskey.

Two nights later, Jones is still only semi-conscious. As the second mate keeps watch, he abruptly screams and falls; he is found to be dead of a stab wound, although the weapon and the source of the attack are unknown; the attack seemed to come out of nowhere, right under the captain's watchful eye. The captain is deeply disturbed, and musters the entire crew for inspection. Everyone is present and accounted for, except Jones and Tommy. We learn that, in the opinion of the first mate, Jones is near death, and the apprentice Tommy is also still too badly injured to have committed the murder. The captain and the first mate are baffled, and become suspicious that the cause was supernatural.

The next day the captain becomes hopelessly drunk; the first mate disposes of the second mate's body, and repeatedly checks on the state of seaman Jones. The first mate goes on watch that evening. During his watch, he sends an older sailor repeatedly to check on Jones; at 2:30 a.m., the seaman reports that Jones has died. A disturbing grating sound is immediately heard, and the first mate, his imagination working overtime, becomes agitated, believing Jones' ghost may be coming for him. We learn that Tommy is also doing poorly, which only adds the mate's fears.

That evening, the captain and the mate keep watch together. After the moonrise, a "strange husky inhuman gurgle" is heard from the bridge, and a "low, incredible, abominable laughter." The mate panics, screaming "he's come for me!" and running to the bridge; he is suddenly stabbed. A figure comes at the captain: "something white and slender that ran upon the captain noiselessly." The captain, panicked, crashes into the steel side of the deck-house and is knocked unconscious. The figure vanishes overboard, apparently without a splash.

In the aftermath, we learn that the white figure was Toby, the ordinary seaman, who had been "hazed to the verge of insanity by the brutality of the captain and the officers on the previous voyage." He was covered with flour, and apparently had been living as a stowaway in among the cargo; he had stabbed the officers from a vantage point hidden in a ventilator. In conclusion, the story tells us that

Tommy regained his health, as did both Captain Jeller and Jacob, the mate; but as a "hardcase" skipper and a "buck-o-mate", they are no longer shining examples.

=== "The Heathen's Revenge" ===
This story was first published in 1988 in chapbook form as "The Way of the Heathen."

=== "The Shamraken Homeward-Bounder" ===
This is considered by some editors such as Jeremy Lassen to be one of Hodgson's finest short stories. It features a remarkable crew of aged sailors who seem to have been at sea for decades; even the one they call the "boy" is fifty years old.

=== "The Albatross" ===
First published in the American pulp magazine Adventure. An albatross is captured on a ship and a message is found tied to it which tells of a water-logged boat where a woman is alone with a ship full of rats. She only has a week's supplies left and as their ship is becalmed, one man takes it on himself to rescue her by rowing to her distant vessel and taking on the rats.

=== "The Stone Ship" ===
An earthquake raises a section of the seabed in the night, bringing with it a strange ship from ages past and stranger creatures from the sea bottom to menace a ship's crew.

=== "Jack Grey, Second Mate" ===
A ship sets out from Frisco with a strangely acting passenger and a crew scraped up off the waterfront. Things quickly escalate from unpleasant to grim in this violent tale. - From Pulpgen.com

=== "The Girl with the Grey Eyes" ===
Hodgson is not known as a writer of romantic stories, although several of his novels contain themes of romantic love amidst the horror and adventure. This is one of a small number of stories that he wrote specifically targeted to female readers of romance magazines.

=== "On the Bridge" ===
This story, presented as a factual minute-by-minute account of events on the bridge of a ship as it navigates through iceberg-filled waters, was actually written to capitalize on interest in the sinking of the Titanic.

=== "Through the Vortex of a Cyclone" ===
A four-masted ship is absorbed by a terrible cyclone storm; an excellent example of the fight between man and nature. The atmosphere is masterly graduated; the story begins among the quiet waters of the ocean beneath clear and blue sky, but gradually the horizont is getting darker, a strange voice is heard, then the ship is plunged into the monstrous hurricane. Then, when it is exactly in the Vortex (the center of the cyclone), the crew members fire an old pistol loaded with a flash-dust and they see the legendary Pyramidal Sea, a sea raised to a high water-hills, while the cry of the cyclone is circulating around them in a distance of several tens of miles. Though not being a fiction or horror story, this tale belongs to the best Mr. Hodgson ever wrote.

=== "The Captain of the Onion Boat" ===
Hodgson is not known as a writer of romantic stories, although several of his novels contain themes of romantic love amidst the horror and adventure. This is one of a small number of stories that he wrote specifically targeted to female readers of romance magazines.

A sea captain is torn between love and respect for duty as he watches the love of his life go about her daily routine in a convent. She entered the convent when he disappeared and she believed he was dead. Eventually at the urging of his first mate, the captain attracts her attention, arranges a liaison, and retrieves the willing woman who then faces an unknown future on an onion boat.
