= Out of the Storm (short story collection) =

1975 collection of short stories by William Hope Hodgson

- Cover of the first edition
- Author: William Hope Hodgson
- Illustrator: Stephen E. Fabian
- Cover artist: Hannes Bok
- Language: English
- Genre: Fantasy
- Publisher: Donald M. Grant, Publisher, Inc.
- Publication date: 1975
- Publication place: United States
- Media type: Print (hardback)
- Pages: 304
- OCLC: 2967352

Out of the Storm is a collection of fantasy short stories by William Hope Hodgson. It was first published in 1975 by Donald M. Grant, Publisher, Inc. in an edition of 2,100 copies.

== Contents ==
- "William Hope Hodgson (The Early Years, Novelist, The Final Years)", by Sam Moskowitz
- "A Tropical Horror"
- "Out of the Storm"
- "The Finding of the Graiken"
- "Eloi Eloi Lama Sabachthani"
- "Terror of the Water-Tank"
- "The Albatross"
- "The Haunting of the Lady Shannon"

== Publication history ==
- 1975, US, Donald M. Grant, Publisher, Inc. OCLC 2967352, Pub date 1975, Hardback
- 1980, US, Centaur Books ISBN 0-87818-016-8, Pub date 1980, Paperback
