= Deep Waters (short story collection) =

- Dust-jacket illustration by Frank Utpatel.
- Author: William Hope Hodgson
- Cover artist: Frank Utpatel
- Language: English
- Genre: Fantasy, Horror
- Publisher: Arkham House
- Publication date: 1967
- Publication place: United States
- Media type: Print (hardback)
- Pages: x, 300

Deep Waters is a collection of short stories by British writer William Hope Hodgson published in 1967 by Arkham House in an edition of 2,556 copies, the second of the author's books to be published by Arkham. The stories are primarily set in the Sargasso Sea.

== Contents ==
Deep Waters contains the following tales:

- "Foreword", by August Derleth
- "The Sea Horses"
- "The Derelict"
- "The Thing in the Weeds"
- "From the Tideless Sea"
- "The Island of the Ud"
- "The Voice in the Night"
- "The Adventure of the Headland"
- "The Mystery of the Derelict"
- "The Shamraken Homeward Bounder"
- "The Stone Ship"
- "The Crew of the Lancing"
- "The Habitants of Middle Islet"
- "The Call in the Dawn"

== Sources ==
- Jaffery, Sheldon (1989). The Arkham House Companion. Mercer Island, WA: Starmont House, Inc. p. 84. ISBN 1-55742-005-X.
- Chalker, Jack L.; Mark Owings (1998). The Science-Fantasy Publishers: A Bibliographic History, 1923-1998. Westminster, MD and Baltimore: Mirage Press, Ltd. p. 44.
- Joshi, S.T. (1999). Sixty Years of Arkham House: A History and Bibliography. Sauk City, WI: Arkham House. p. 97. ISBN 0-87054-176-5.
- Nielsen, Leon (2004). Arkham House Books: A Collector's Guide. Jefferson, NC and London: McFarland & Company, Inc. p. 98. ISBN 0-7864-1785-4.
