= Out of the Storm =

Out of the Storm may refer to:

- Out of the Storm (short story collection), a 1975 collection of fantasy short stories by William Hope Hodgson
- Out of the Storm (Jack Bruce album), 1974
- Out of the Storm (Ed Thigpen album), 1966
- Out of the Storm (1920 film), a lost American silent drama film
- Out of the Storm (1926 film), an American silent drama film
- Out of the Storm (1948 film), an American crime film
