= Beyond Time and Space =

1950 anthology edited by August Derleth

- Cover of the first edition.
- Editor: August Derleth
- Language: English
- Genre: Science fiction
- Publisher: Pellegrini & Cudahy
- Publication date: 1950
- Publication place: United States
- Media type: Print (hardback)
- Pages: 704

Beyond Time and Space is an anthology of science fiction stories edited by American writer August Derleth. It was first published by Pellegrini & Cudahy in 1950. Several of the stories had originally appeared in the magazines The Century, The Atlantic Monthly, The Strand, Blue Book, Blackwood's Magazine, Weird Tales, Amazing Stories, Astounding Stories, Maclean's, The American Legion Magazine and Startling Stories. A heavily abridged paperback edition was issued by Berkley Books in 1958.

== Contents ==
- Introduction, by August Derleth
- Atlantis (excerpt), by Plato
- A True History (excerpt), by Lucian of Samosata
- Utopia (excerpt), by Sir Thomas More
- The Phalanstery of Theleme (excerpt), by Francis Rabelais
- The City of the Sun (excerpt), by Tommaso Campanella
- The Man on the Moone (excerpt), by Francis Godwin
- "Laputa" (excerpt from Gulliver’s Travels), by Jonathan Swift
- Somnium (excerpt), by Johannes Kepler
- New Atlantis (excerpt), by Francis Bacon
- The Tree Men of Potu (excerpt), by Ludwig Holberg
- "The Thousand-and-Second Tale of Scheherazade", by Edgar Allan Poe
- "Doctor Ox’s Experiment", by Jules Verne
- "Pausodyne", by J. Arbuthnot Wilson
- "Tale of Negative Gravity", by Frank R. Stockton
- "The Blindman’s World", by Edward Bellamy
- "The Battle of the Monsters", by Morgan Robertson
- "The New Accelerator", by H. G. Wells
- "The Voice in the Night", by William Hope Hodgson
- "Space", by John Buchan
- "When the Green Star Waned", by Nictzin Dyalhis
- "The Revolt of the Pedestrians", by David H. Keller, M.D.
- "The Lotus Eaters", by Stanley G. Weinbaum
- "Wingless Victory", by H. F. Heard
- "When the Bough Breaks", by Lewis Padgett
- "Wanted—An Enemy", by Fritz Leiber
- "The Exiles", by Ray Bradbury
- "The Long Watch", by Robert A. Heinlein
- "Minority Report", by Theodore Sturgeon
- "Colossus", by Donald Wandrei
- "A Voyage to Sfanomoë", by Clark Ashton Smith
- "The Seesaw", by A. E. van Vogt
- "The Flying Men" (excerpt from Last and First Men), by Olaf Stapledon
- "Fessenden’s Worlds", by Edmond Hamilton
- "Humpty Dumpty Had a Great Fall", by Frank Belknap Long

== Reception ==
Reviewer Villiers Gerson of The New York Times praised the anthology, saying "the overall excellence of the stories selected is a measure of Mr. Derleth's ability of an editor." Groff Conklin noted that while Derleth's selection of older stories was sound, the more contemporary choices tended to be "tales of the weird, the supernatural or the fantastic" which did not "represent modern science fiction". P. Schuyler Miller praised the anthology as a "fat but rather expensive collection truly representative of most of the growing pains of our young-old genre." Boucher and McComas declared that "Derleth has succeeded admirably in his attempt to 'glance backward over the stream of science fiction,' bringing together the much discussed -- but too seldom read -- classics of the field" and "some of the best efforts of" contemporary writers". Wilson Tucker, however, gave Beyond Time and Space a more indifferent review, saying "Derleth has succeeded in compiling a record of science fiction through the ages -- if you like to keep such records". Robert A. W. Lowndes challenged Derleth's claim to presenting a collection of stories associating contemporary science fiction with classical imaginative work, saying "if his anthology proves anything, [it] proves that there is no such connection to be made".

== Sources ==
- Contento, William G. "Index to Science Fiction Anthologies and Collections". Archived from the original on 2007-12-22.
- Tuck, Donald H. (1974). The Encyclopedia of Science Fiction and Fantasy. Chicago: Advent. p. 139. ISBN 0-911682-20-1.
