= The Place of Storms =

"The Place of Storms" is a long poem by William Hope Hodgson. It is notable for its internal rhymes and assonance, extensive use of metaphor, and powerful imagery, all put to the service of describing a storm at sea.
