= The Voice in the Night (short story) =

- Short story by William Hope Hodgson
- Language: English
- Genres: Science fiction, horror

Publication
- Published in: Blue Book Magazine
- Publication date: November 1907

"The Voice in the Night" is a short story by English writer William Hope Hodgson, first published in the November 1907 edition of Blue Book Magazine. The story has been adapted a number of times, most prominently in the 1963 Japanese film Matango.

Weird fungi in the shape of animals or humans are a recurring theme in Hodgson's stories and novels; for example, in the novel The Boats of the "Glen Carrig" the survivors of a shipwreck come across tree-like plants that mimic (or, perhaps, have absorbed) birds and people.

== Plot synopsis ==
In this story, a schooner at sea ("becalmed in the Northern Pacific") is approached in the middle of "a dark, starless night" by a small rowboat. The passenger aboard the boat, who refuses to bring his boat close alongside and requests that the sailors on the schooner put away their lanterns, tells everyone a disturbing tale. Begging food for his fiancée, he receives some rations, floated to him in a wooden box. Later that same evening, he returns to report that his fiancée is grateful for the food, but will soon die, and he tells the sailors his full story.

He and his fiancée, aboard the ship Albatross, were abandoned by the ship's crew, who took the remaining lifeboats. After building a raft, they escaped from the sinking vessel and found an apparently abandoned ship in a nearby lagoon, covered with a fungus-like growth. They attempted to remove this growth from the living quarters but were unable to do so; it continued to spread, and so they returned to their raft. The nearby island was also covered with this growth, except for a narrow beach. Eventually, the man and his fiancee found the fungus growing on their skin and felt an uncontrollable urge to eat it. They discovered that other humans on the island have been entirely absorbed by the strange fungal growth.

As the man in the rowboat rows away, just as the sky is lightening, the narrator can dimly see a grotesquely misshapen figure in the rowboat, scarcely recognisable as human.

== Publication history ==
After its first outing, the story was reprinted numerous times: in collections of Hodgson's stories like Deep Waters, in more general anthologies like Beyond Time and Space, as well as in other publications like Twilight Zone Magazine. It also appeared in Alfred Hitchcock's paperback anthology Alfred Hitchcock Presents: Stories They Wouldn't Let Me Do on TV which appeared in several imprints, e.g. Simon and Schuster (1957); most recently by Amereon Ltd (January 2002) ISBN 0848819853

== Adaptations ==
=== Film ===
The story has been filmed twice. The first and more faithful adaptation, under the title "Voice in the Night," was made as episode 1x24 of the television series Suspicion (1958). This was one of 10 episodes of Suspicion made by Shamley Productions, the company established by Alfred Hitchcock to produce Alfred Hitchcock Presents. It was directed by Arthur Hiller from a script by Stirling Silliphant. It starred (in the order they were billed in the titles and credits) Barbara Rush, James Donald, Patrick Macnee, and James Coburn.

The second filmed adaptation was the Japanese motion picture Matango (1963), shown on American television under the title Attack of the Mushroom People.

Episode 229 of the Japanese anime Naruto Shippuden, titled, "Eat or Die! Mushrooms from Hell!", is an adaptation of this story, in which mushrooms overtake the ship on which the team is sailing. Upon being eaten, the mushrooms sprout from the eater's skin and influence their actions.

=== Comics ===
The story acted as the springboard for the story "Forbidden Fruit" in The Haunt of Fear No. 9.

Doug Wheeler adapted the concept for his run on DC Comics' Swamp Thing, even naming the main villain Matango.

== Similar works ==
"Gray Matter", a short story by Stephen King first published in the October 1973 issue of Cavalier magazine, and later collected in King's 1978 collection Night Shift, is the story of a man who, having become reclusive after a work-related accident, drinks a bad can of beer and is ultimately overtaken by fungal growth from within.

John Brosnan's novel The Fungus from 1985 has a similar plot, in which mutated fungi destroy England, and those infected die or become mutated mushroom people, depending on which type of fungus has infected them.

Brian Lumley's short story "Fruiting Bodies", which won the British Fantasy Award in 1989, concerns a strange fungus that slowly destroys a town and ultimately consumes the bodies of the last remaining residents, but keeps their form. The story ends ominously as wood from the town has been harvested for use in homes across England, and the narrator has inhaled spores from the strange fungi. Lumley has named "The Voice in the Night" as one of his favourite stories.

Richard Corben's Shadows on the Grave (2018) features a story titled "Roots in Hell", which centers on a couple stranded on a uninhabited island after their plane crashes in a storm, and coming in contact with a strange tree growth that ends up painfully mutating the man into a humanoid tree after eating a fruit. His wife escapes from him and the island on an inflatable raft but ends up succumbing to the infection and is found by an indigenous fishing party that decides to sink the raft to the bottom of the ocean.

The concept of fungal symbiosis or assimilation of humans is also frequently found in the work of Jeff VanderMeer, especially in his "Ambergris" novels and short stories.

The same concept is used in the video game The Last of Us, in which a mutant species of Cordyceps ravages the United States, transforming the majority of those it infects into mindless fungal zombies.
