= Sadao Bekku =

Japanese composer (1922–2012)

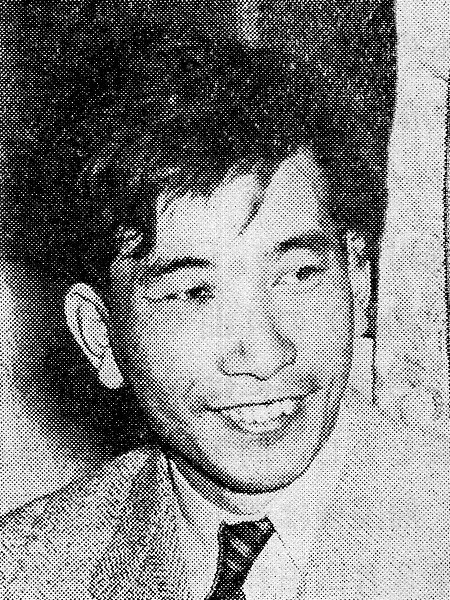
- Born: March 24, 1922; Tokyo, Japan
- Died: January 12, 2012 (aged 89)
- Other name: 別宮 貞雄
- Occupation: composer
- Relatives: grand father:Yamagiwa Katsusaburō (pathologist)

Sadao Bekku (別宮貞雄, Bekku Sadao; May 24, 1922, in Tokyo – January 12, 2012, in Mitaka, Tokyo) was a Japanese classical composer. His works include five symphonies, film scores, a flute sonata, a piano concerto, choral work and art songs, and the opera, Prince Arima.

His work took strong influence from jazz. His best-known works include the film score Matango (1963).

== Major works ==
=== Operas ===
- A Story of Three Women (Le dit des trois femmes) (1964)
- 有間皇子 (Prince Arima (Arima-no Miko)) (1963–67)
- Aoi-no-ue

=== Orchestral works ===
- Deux mouvements pour orchestre (1946)
- Suite classique (1947)
- Introduction et Allegro (1954)
- Deux prières (1956)
- Symphonietta for String Orchestra (1959)
- Symphony No. 1 (1961)
- Concerto pour violon et orchestre (1969)
- Concerto pour alto et orchestre (1971)
- Symphony No. 2 (1977)
- Concerto pour piano et orchestre (1980)
- Festival Overture (1981)
- Symphony No. 3 "Spring" (1984)
- Memories of Pictures: Suite for Wind Band (1987/2005)
- March "Be Pure, Be Fresh" for wind orchestra (1988)
- Symphony No. 4 "The Summer 1945" (1989)
- Concerto pour violoncelle et orchestre "Autumn" (1997)
- Symphony No. 5 "Man" (1999)

=== Chamber works ===
- Trio d'anches for bassoon, oboe and clarinet (1953)
- Sonate pour flûte et piano (1954)
- Suite japonaise Nr. 1 for wind quintet (1955)
- Quatuor à cordes Nr. 1 (1955–57)
- 1er sonate pour violon et piano (1963–67)
- Sonate pour violoncelle et piano (1974)
- Aubade for flute, violin and piano (1976)
- Suite "Chants de ville" for alto saxophone and piano (1981)
- Petit pastoral for flute and piano (1983)
- 《Hide and Seek》 and 《Tag》: Two Players for Two Marimbas (1988)
- Trio for Violin, Cello and Piano (1995)
- Kaleidoscope No. 2 for marimba (2002)
- Autumn for violoncello and piano (2004)

=== Piano works ===
- Sonatine (1965)
- Suite "Kaleidescope" (1966)
- Three Paraphrases Based on Folksongs of Southern Japan (1968)
- Sonatine in Classical Style (1969)
- Festa in the north: Japanese Suite No. 2 for piano by 4 hands (1989)

=== Vocal works ===
- Light-coloured Pictures for voice and piano (1948)
- 2 Rondels for voice and piano (1951)
- Three Songs Based Man-yō-shū poems (1958)
- Giant's Garden for narrator, mixed choir, orchestra and electronic sound (1962)
- The Four Seasons of the Mountain for mixed choir (1967)

=== Film music ===
Bekku composed about 40 film scores from 1954 to 1978.

- Ghost of Hanging in Utusunomiya aka The Ceiling at Utsunomiya (怪異宇都宮釣天井 Kaii Utsunomiya tsuritenjō) (1956)
- 姫君剣法 謎の紫頭巾 (1957)
- 日本南極地域観測隊の記録 南極大陸 (1957)
- 南極大陸 (1957)
- 天下の鬼夜叉姫 (1957)
- (遙かなる男 Shizukanaru otoko) (1957) literally: The Quiet Man
- (太平洋戦記 Taiheiyō senki) (1958)
- 密告者は誰か (1958)
- 黒部侠谷 第二部 地底の凱歌 (1959)
- Matango (マタンゴ) (1963) aka Attack of the Mushroom People
- 恐怖の時間 (1964)
- White Rose of Hong Kong (香港の白い薔薇 Honkon no shiroibara)(1965)
- Key of Keys (国際秘密警察 鍵の鍵 Kokusai himitsu keisatsu: Kagi no kagi) (1965) literally: International Secret Police: Key of Keys
- (国際秘密警察 絶体絶命 Kokusai himitsu keisatsu: Zettai zetsumi) (1967)
- (ニイタカヤマノボレ −日本帝国の崩壊− Niitakayama nobore) (1968)
- (喜劇 駅前開運 Kigeki ekimae kaiun) (1968)
