= Captain Gault =

Fictional sea captain

Captain Gault is a fictional sea captain created by English writer William Hope Hodgson. Many of the Captain Gault stories were collected in the book Captain Gault, Being the Exceedingly Private Log of a Sea-Captain, published in 1917.

== Notes on the series ==
Captain Gault seems to be a captain for hire, and operates a different ship in each of the stories. Some take place in England, some in the United States, some in Havanna, and some in Europe. Gault himself is a morally ambiguous character who follows the pattern of many famous fictional criminals: although a law-breaker (he seems primarily interested in making money), he proves also to have a strict moral code. As the series progresses, we learn tantalizing bits of information about Captain Gault: he seems to be highly placed in a secret society; he has occult knowledge about arcane religious artifacts; he seems to be very knowledgeable about gemstones; he is a skilled amateur painter. In general, he reveals himself to have surprising reservoirs of specialized knowledge. Where he got all this knowledge is generally not revealed; we get only these tantalizing hints at the character's past.

The Captain Gault stories tend to follow several patterns. Most of the stories are about smuggling, usually involving a great deal of cleverness; often the plot centers on information that is known to Captain Gault but not provided to the reader. There is usually some kind of misinformation or even play-acting performed for the misdirection of customs officials. Sometimes the deception is in sleight-of-hand; sometimes it is in the Captain's choice of hiding place (which may be in plain sight). In many of the stories the customs officials or other law-enforcement personnel involved are told about the plot. Sometimes Gault's own confidants are fed misinformation so that they can reveal it, as part of the deception. The stories usually end with a smug Captain Gault explaining the plot, sometimes over dinner, and sometimes by letter.

== Story summaries ==
=== "Contraband of War" ===
Captain Gault leads into a plot to smuggle a cargo of rifles directly under the watchful eye of customs.

=== "The Diamond Spy" ===
Captain Gault smuggles diamonds past customs officials. The plot involves a cage of chickens who are fed phony diamonds to deceive a spy.

=== "The Red Herring" ===
Captain Gault smuggles pearls using the customs officials themselves, a bribe, and a planted, duplicate bag in a double deception.

=== "The Case of the Chinese Curio Dealer" ===
This is a longer Captain Gault story and takes place in San Francisco. The plot is quite complex and involves deception, danger, ancient artifacts, and cross-dressing. Captain Gault is revealed to be a member of a secret society.

=== "The Drum of Saccharine" ===
Captain Gault's associates on board attempt to smuggle saccharine and ask his assistance.

=== "From Information Received" ===
Another bait-and-switch plot, this one centering on smuggling cigars directly from Cuba and some play-acting in front of customs officials.

=== "The German Spy" ===
Captain Gault's loyalties are tested in this war-time story.

=== "The Problem of the Pearls" ===
Pearls are hidden in plain sight.

=== "The Painted Lady" ===
This story about the nerve-wracking smuggling of the famed Mona Lisa. It is revealed that Captain Gault has a talent for painting.

=== "The Adventure of the Garter" ===
Another story that tests Captain Gault's ability to withstand feminine wiles.

=== "My Lady's Jewels" ===
Captain Gault agrees to help a wealthy, older female passenger avoid paying duties on a very valuable necklace.

=== "Trading with the Enemy" ===
Captain Gault tricks German submarines in a double deception as he sells them fuel for their submarines.

=== "The Plans of the Reefing Bi-Plane" ===
In another wartime story, Captain Gault plays German soldiers for fools in a standoff situation.

== Bibliography ==
- In the fourth season of the ABC drama Lost, Captain Gault is also the name of the captain of the mysterious freighter offshore of the island.
