= The Haunted Pampero =

- Dust-jacket from the first edition
- Author: William Hope Hodgson
- Illustrator: Arthur E. Moore
- Cover artist: Arthur E. Moore
- Language: English
- Genre: Fantasy
- Publisher: Donald M. Grant, Publisher, Inc.
- Publication date: 1992
- Publication place: United States
- Media type: Print (hardback)
- Pages: 2724 pp
- ISBN: 0-937986-98-4
- OCLC: 27897375
- Dewey Decimal: 823/.912 20
- LC Class: PR6015.O253 H38 1991

The Haunted Pampero is a collection of fantasy and other short stories by William Hope Hodgson. It was first published in 1992 by Donald M. Grant, Publisher, Inc. in an edition of 500 copies, all of which were signed by the editor, Sam Moskowitz. The stories first appeared in the magazines The Premier Magazine, The Red Magazine, Cornhill Magazine, The Idler, Shadow: Fantasy Literature Review, The Royal Magazine, The Blue Magazine, Sea Stories, The New Age, Everybody’s Weekly and Short Stories.

== Contents ==
- Preface, by Sam Moskowitz
- "The Posthumous Acceptance of William Hope Hodgson 1918–1943", by Sam Moskowitz
- "The Haunted 'Pampero'"
- "The Ghosts of the 'Glen Doon'"
- "The Valley of the Lost Children"
- "Carnacki, The Ghost Finder: The House Among the Laurels"
- "The Silent Ship"
- "The Goddess of Death"
- "A Timely Escape"
- "The Wild Man of the Sea"
- "Date 1965: Modern Warfare"
- "Bullion"
- "Old Golly"
- "The Storm"
