= The Dream of X =

1912 novel by William Hope Hodgson

- Dust-jacket from the first edition
- Author: William Hope Hodgson
- Illustrator: Stephen E. Fabian
- Cover artist: Stephen E. Fabian
- Language: English
- Genre: Science fiction
- Publisher: Donald M. Grant, Publisher, Inc.
- Publication date: 1912 (in Poems and the Dream of X); 1977 (stand-alone book)
- Publication place: United States
- Media type: Print (hardback)
- Pages: 141
- OCLC: 3169834

The Dream of X is a novella by English writer William Hope Hodgson, an abridged version of his 1912 science fiction novel The Night Land.

== Publication history ==
The Night Land was published in England in 1912. At that time, copyright in the United States could not be obtained until a book was printed within the US, but Hodgson was unable to find an American publisher willing to accept his 200,000-word novel. As an alternative, he condensed the narrative to 20,000 words and personally financed a US edition by publisher R. Harold Paget, thereby securing US copyright.

It also included a novelette entitled Mutiny, an abridged version of the story "'Prentices' Mutiny", and thirteen of Hodgson's poems, which were later included in his other posthumously published books of poetry. The abridgement by itself was republished in a limited edition in 1977, with an introduction by Sam Moskowitz and colour illustrations by Stephen Fabian, under the title The Dream of X (West Kingston, R.I.: Donald M. Grant, 1977).

The abridgment was originally published as part of the chapbook collection Poems and the Dream of X in 1912 by R. Harold Paget. It was first published as a stand-alone book in 1977 by Donald M. Grant, Publisher, Inc. with an introduction by science fiction historian Sam Moskowitz, in an edition of 2,220 copies.

== Sources ==
- Chalker, Jack L.; Mark Owings (1998). The Science-Fantasy Publishers: A Bibliographic History, 1923-1998. Westminster, MD and Baltimore: Mirage Press, Ltd. p. 324.
- Clute, John; John Grant (1997). The Encyclopedia of Fantasy. New York: St. Martin's Press. p. 471. ISBN 0-88184-708-9.
- Moskowitz, Sam (1977). "Return to the Night Land; An Introduction". The Dream of X. West Kingston, Rhode Island: Donald M. Grant, Publisher, Inc. pp. 9–12. OCLC 3169834.
- Tuck, Donald H. (1974). The Encyclopedia of Science Fiction and Fantasy. Chicago: Advent. p. 225. ISBN 0-911682-20-1.
