= Herman Charles Koenig =

American novelist

Herman Charles Koenig (November 28, 1893 – July 6, 1959) was a publisher, writer, an avid collector of first editions and fantasy literature and a friend of the fantasy writer H. P. Lovecraft. Koenig was one of the last few members to join Lovecraft's informal literary circle, the Kalem Club (the last names of the earliest members started with the letters K, L or M).

Koenig was born in Hoboken, New Jersey, the last child in the family of Herman Koenig (listed as “Henry König” in the 1870 United States census) and Anna Poggenburg, German immigrants. He graduated magna cum laude from Cooper Union, and worked as the laboratory manager at Electrical Testing Laboratories in New York City.

A lifelong fan of fantasy fiction, he contributed articles to early fanzines in this field, and published his own fanzine The Reader and Collector, printing twenty issues from 1938 to 1946.

He collaborated with the writer August Derleth, one of Lovecraft's many correspondents, who founded the publishing company Arkham House to print Lovecraft's work after his death. Koenig was one of the few people who printed some of Lovecraft's writings during the latter's lifetime. Based on a long letter Lovecraft had written to Koenig in 1936, he privately printed in mimeograph form the essay Charleston. It included photo copies of Lovecraft's sketches of architectural highlights of that South Carolina city.

Koenig is also acknowledged for his efforts in fostering in the United States the writings of British author William Hope Hodgson, circulating copies of Hodgson's books to Lovecraft and others. When Arkham House reprinted four of Hodgson's novels (The House on the Borderland and Other Novels) in 1946, Derleth asked Koenig to write the introduction.
