= The Derelict (short story) =

1912 short story by William Hope Hodgson

- Short story by William Hope Hodgson

Text available at Wikisource
- Country: United Kingdom
- Language: English
- Genre: Horror short story

Publication
- Published in: The Harmsworth Red Magazine
- Media type: Print
- Publication date: December 1, 1912

The Derelict is a short story by the English writer William Hope Hodgson, first published in The Harmsworth Red Magazine on December 1, 1912.

== Plot summary ==
As he does in many of his stories, Hodgson employs a framework or "story within a story." In the framework, an elderly ship's doctor recounts a strange event that happened to him some years earlier, in the context of discussing his ideas about a fundamental life force that can manifest itself in the presence of proper materials.

While sailing as a passenger, a sudden storm disables the ship. In the aftermath, a derelict vessel is discovered. A small boat is sent to investigate, since from a distance the shape of the vessel seems to indicate that it is surprisingly ancient. The captain is interested in possible salvage.

Upon boarding the vessel, the investigators discover that it is encased in a thick fungus-like encrustation. In order to go below the deck, the captain kicks the encrustation, which begins to spurt a reddish fluid, and a rhythmic thudding like a heartbeat is heard. The solid surface of the encrustation begins softening and heaving, becoming mobile and gelatinous, and actually begins to dissolve the shoes of the investigators, as if it is attempting to digest them.

As events escalate, the lantern is dropped and extinguished; in the frantic attempt that follows to escape the vessel, a crewman is killed as he falls on the undulating surface and it envelopes and dissolves his body. The doctor and the captain manage to get over the side into an old lifeboat where they beat off a pseudopod and manage to escape back to their own vessel.

The doctor believes that the particular combination of cargo aboard the derelict, as it decayed, may have resulted in spontaneous generation of a new life form.

== Adaptations ==
- An audio dramatized version is available from Atlanta Radio Theatre Company.
- "Episode 38: Maine-based William Dufris Does William Hope Hodgson's 'The Derelict'". Radio Drama Revival. 5 October 2007.
- "The SFFaudio Podcast #219 – AUDIOBOOK/READALONG: The Derelict by William Hope Hodgson". SFFaudio. 1 July 2013.
- "Tales To Terrify 177 Hodgson". Tales to Terrify. 12 June 2015.
