= The House on the Borderland =

1908 novel by William Hope Hodgson

- Cover of The House on the Borderland
- Author: William Hope Hodgson
- Language: English
- Genre: Horror novel
- Publisher: Chapman and Hall
- Publication date: 1 Jan 1908
- Publication place: United Kingdom
- Media type: Print (hardcover)
- Pages: 300 pp (1st edition)
- Text: The House on the Borderland at Wikisource

The House on the Borderland (1908) is a supernatural horror novel by British fantasist William Hope Hodgson. The novel is a hallucinatory account of a recluse's stay at a remote house, and his experiences of supernatural creatures and otherworldly dimensions.

On encountering Hodgson's novels in 1934, American horror writer H. P. Lovecraft praised The House on the Borderland and other works by Hodgson at length. Terry Pratchett has called the novel "the Big Bang in my private universe as a science fiction and fantasy reader and, later, writer".

== Plot summary ==
Two men on a two-week fishing holiday in remote western Ireland are surprised to discover a strange abyss. On a rock spur above this pit they find ruins and buried in them a journal, which they read.

The author of the journal introduces himself as an old man who has lived for years in an ancient house accompanied only by his sister, who serves as housekeeper, and his dog, Pepper. He has no contact with the local inhabitants, who say he is mad. The house is circular in form and its weird appearance includes peculiar decorations that suggest leaping flames. It has had an evil reputation for centuries and had been empty for many years when he purchased it. The diary will record his strange experiences and thoughts.

Late one night, as he was reading in his study, the candles suddenly burned green and then red. Pepper hid under his chair and he sat still, frightened. The red light went low, and he was no longer afraid. The far side of the room became a vision of a vast empty plain. He floated like a bubble into space, leaving the earth and sun behind as he travelled into utter darkness. He reached the world of the vast plain, whose sun is a wreath of red flame. He was brought to an arena: an immense green jade copy of his own house, at the centre of a circle miles across, circled by mountains containing hundreds of huge idols of beast-gods and horrors. As he nears the huge building, a humanoid creature with the head of a huge swine is trying to get into the House. The swine-creature suddenly moves toward him, but he is borne upward, then reverses his travel through space to return to his study.

Several months later, horrible pig-faced creatures with dead-white skin emerge from a nearby pit and assault the house. The swine-things are strong and intelligent but are unable to break in; after a night and day in which the Recluse kills some of them they disappear. He is terrified by the violent creatures and he waits several days before leaving the house with Pepper to search the former gardens outside.

A week later, he and Pepper explore the pit that appears to be the source of the swine-things. A tunnel leads to an immensely deep abyss. Water flows down the tunnel, and the struggle of wading against it to get back out is exhausting. Two weeks afterwards the pit has become a lake. He revisits a trap door in the cellar, realizing that it opens to the bottomless abyss.

Asleep in his study, the Recluse awakens into a place like a mist of light and meets his lost love. She calls the place the Sea of Sleep, and implores him to leave the evil House, but admits that they would never have met again had he been anywhere else.

The journal starts again, with the passage of time increasing in speed. Days and nights pass more and more quickly, the sun and moon become flickers and years blur. Pepper's body, then his own, crumble into dust. The house falls, the world fades, time slowly grinds to a halt and the Solar System ends with his perception of an immense green star, celestial globes, and another timeless meeting in the Sea of Sleep with the lost love. He is brought again to the arena and into the great house. He is again in his own study, with time running normally.

The malicious Swine-creature from the arena inflicts a luminous fungal growth on a dog, and the Recluse is barely able to stop himself from letting it into the house. He has also contracted the disease, and the manuscript ends with the man in his study as the creature comes through the trap door in the cellar.

The two men recover from reading the journal and return to fishing, making no attempt to revisit the horrible pit. Their driver interviews an old man in the local village who remembers the evil house that everyone avoided had once been occupied by an unsociable old man and his elderly sister. Once a month, a man who didn't speak to the villagers took supplies to the house; years went by until suddenly that man excitedly reported that the house had disappeared and there was now a chasm where it had been.

== Literary significance and criticism ==
The book was a milestone that signalled a radical departure from the typical Gothic fiction of the late 19th century. Hodgson created a newer and more realistic/scientific cosmic horror that left a marked impression on those who would become the great writers of the weird tales of the middle of the 20th century, particularly Clark Ashton Smith, and H. P. Lovecraft. David Pringle rated The House on the Borderland three stars out of four and called the novel a "frightening tale". Reviewing the book, Neil Barron called it "An imaginative tour de force whose power transcends its patchwork construction; the cosmic vision sequence makes it equally interesting as a scientific romance, but it definitely strikes what its admirer H. P. Lovecraft sought to define as 'the true note of cosmic horror'."

== Release details ==
This novel was first published in Britain by Chapman and Hall, Ltd., London in 1908. Its most popular version was by Arkham House Press, Sauk City, Wisconsin, in 1946 as part of The House on the Borderland and Other Novels, the same publishers that brought out many books by other authors of weird fiction, such as H. P. Lovecraft.

== Adaptations ==
=== In print ===
In 2000, DC Comics’ mature reader imprint Vertigo published a 96-page color graphic-novel adaptation The House on the Borderland, with story by Simon Revelstroke and art by Richard Corben. The book is available in soft and hardcover and contains an introduction by British comic writer Alan Moore. Revelstroke updated Hodgson's initial "manuscript discovery" frame to 1952 Ireland, and while he made an effort to retain most of the original plot and dialogue, excepting the very last page, the climax is purely Revelstroke's invention. In the credits, Revelstroke listed himself as a "Carnacki Fellow" currently "teaching at the Glen Carrig School of Nautical Horticulture", both direct (and fictional) references to Hodgson's other literary works. The adaptation was nominated for an International Horror Guild Award for Best Illustrated Narrative.

=== In music ===
The English doom metal band Electric Wizard featured the song "The House on the Borderland" on their Electric Wizard/Reverend Bizarre (2008) split EP.

The American Rock band Into Another featured the song "William" on their Ignaurus (1994) album. The song expresses a feeling of camaraderie with "William" and includes the lyric: "truth lives in a house on the borderland".

As part of their debut LP Escándalo en Bohemia, the Spanish pop band, Los Wattsons, offered "La casa más allá del confín de la tierra", the lyrics and music of which strive to recreate the spirit of the Hodgson tale.

=== On radio ===
In 2007, BBC Radio released a two-hour-long, four-episode dramatization of the novel.

=== In games ===
In 2020, a solitaire board game adaptation of The House on the Borderland was included in issue #2 of Lurker Magazine and co-published by the Emperors of Eternal Evil.

== Sources ==
- Bleiler, Everett (1948). The Checklist of Fantastic Literature. Chicago: Shasta Publishers. p. 150.
