= The Baumoff Explosive =

1919 horror story by William Hope Hodgson

"The Baumoff Explosive", also known as "Eloi, Eloi, Lama Sabachthani" is a horror story by William Hope Hodgson, first published in 1919.

== Plot ==
The story is told using a framework or "story within a story", a method used by Hodgson in many of his stories. It is learned in the framework story that a strange new explosive has been developed. Invented by a man named Baumoff, this substance has the effect of creating a temporary area of darkness, into which light does not readily pass.

The main body of the story describes the narrator's meeting with Baumoff, who is described as a scientist who is also profoundly Christian and obsessed with the crucifixion. Baumoff believes that events following Christ's death (the darkening of the sky, the rending of the temple curtain, and shaking of the ground, as described in the gospels) have a rational, scientific basis. This basis is the ability of the human psyche to affect the aether and impede the transmission of light. Baumoff displays a tiny quantity of a chemical compound which, when crushed and burned, creates a region of temporary darkness.

Baumoff then goes on to demonstrate what happens when the substance is "burned" (metabolized) within his own body. While the narrator watches in horror, Baumoff's heart rate and respiration increase dangerously, and he begins driving metal spikes into his hands and feet to simulate the pain of Christ's crucifixion. The narrator begs him to stop his demonstration, but Baumoff insists that the narrator only observe and take careful note. The flickering darkness returns, and the house begins to shake. Baumoff begins to imagine that he is reliving Christ's final hours, which by putting himself in the place of Christ, verges on blasphemy; as he describes what he is imagining, the narrator himself sees a vision of Christ carrying the cross. Baumoff screams some of Christ's last words on the cross, "Eloi, Eloi, Lama Sabachthani?" ("My God, my God, why have you forsaken me?")

As the pain of his self-inflicted torture reaches its maximum, a gasping Baumoff cries out Christ's words again. The cry is repeated a second time, but this time by a mocking, demonic voice. In the darkness, the building shakes, and the narrator is knocked unconscious. When he awakens, he finds Baumoff dead, his face distorted. The rational explanation is heart failure, but the narrator cannot help believing that Baumoff's blasphemy may have invited in a demonic force. We are left to ponder the implications of this strange weapon, wondering if other (willing, or unwitting) "soldiers of Christ" are being readied for torture and death.
