= The Night Land =

1912 novel by William Hope Hodgson

- Original cover.
- Author: William Hope Hodgson
- Language: English
- Genre: Fantasy, horror, science fiction
- Publisher: Eveleigh Nash
- Publication date: 1912
- Publication place: United Kingdom
- Media type: Print (hardback)
- Pages: 584

The Night Land is a horror and fantasy novel by English writer William Hope Hodgson, first published in 1912. As a work of fantasy it belongs to the Dying Earth subgenre. Hodgson also published a much shorter version of the novel, titled The Dream of X (1912).

== Publication history ==
The Night Land was revived in paperback by Ballantine Books, which republished the work in two parts as the 49th and 50th volumes of its Ballantine Adult Fantasy series in July 1972. H. P. Lovecraft's essay "Supernatural Horror in Literature" describes the novel as "one of the most potent pieces of macabre imagination ever written". Clark Ashton Smith wrote of it:

In all literature, there are few works so sheerly remarkable, so purely creative, as The Night Land. Whatever faults this book may possess, however inordinate its length may seem, it impresses the reader as being the ultimate saga of a perishing cosmos, the last epic of a world beleaguered by eternal night and by the unvisageable spawn of darkness. Only a great poet could have conceived and written this story; and it is perhaps not illegitimate to wonder how much of actual prophecy may have been mingled with the poesy.

When the book was written, the nature of the energy source that powers stars was not known: Lord Kelvin had published calculations based on the hypothesis that the energy came from the gravitational collapse of the gas cloud that had formed the sun and found that this mechanism gave the Sun a lifetime of only a few tens of millions of years. Starting from this premise, Hodgson wrote a novel describing a time, millions of years in the future, when the Sun has gone dark.

== Plot summary ==
The beginning of the book establishes the framework in which a 17th-century gentleman, mourning the death of his beloved, Lady Mirdath, is given a vision of a far-distant future where their souls will be re-united, and sees the world of that time through the eyes of a future incarnation. The language and style used are intended to resemble those of the 17th century, though the prose has features characteristic of no particular period, such as an almost complete lack of dialogue or proper names. Ian Bell has suggested that John Milton's epic poem Paradise Lost (1667) was probably a partial inspiration for Hodgson's novel, especially in view of the hellish visions of sombre intensity that mark both works, and the use of massive structures (the Temple of Pandemonium in Milton and the Last Redoubt in The Night Land).

The 17th-century framing becomes inconsequential as the story focuses on the future. The Sun has gone out and the Earth is lit only by the glow of residual vulcanism. The last few millions of the human race are gathered together in the Last Redoubt, a gigantic metal pyramid, nearly 8 mi (13 km) high, which is under siege from unknown forces and Powers outside in the dark. These are held back by a shield known as the "air clog", powered from a subterranean energy source called the "Earth Current". For thousands of years vast living shapes known as the Watchers have waited in the darkness near the pyramid. It is thought that they are waiting for the inevitable time when the civilization's power finally weakens and dies. Other living things have been seen in the darkness, some of unknown origins, and others that may once have been human. Hodgson uses the term "Abhuman" to name several different species of intelligent beings evolved from humans who interbred with alien species or adapted to changed environmental conditions, and are seen as decayed or maligned by those living inside the Last Redoubt.

The narrator establishes mind contact with an inhabitant of a forgotten Lesser Redoubt. First, one expedition sets off to succour the inhabitants of the Lesser Redoubt, whose own Earth Current has been exhausted, only to meet with disaster. After that the narrator sets off alone into the darkness to find the girl he has made contact with, knowing now that she is the reincarnation of his past love.

At the conclusion of the adventure the narrative does not return to the framework story, but ends with the homecoming of the couple and the narrator's inauguration into the ranks of their most honoured heroes.

== Sample text ==
And it grew in me that I did act weakly to hold off from mine Vittles, and showed foolishness before my kind friend afar; and I did ope my scrip, and take therefrom three tablets, the which I chewed and did eat; for this was a strong food, treated that it had but small bulk. Yet were they not filling to the belly; and I made that I would drink well, that I might feel that something was therein.

And to this end, I shook from a strong and especial tube, a dust; and I caught the dust within a little cup; and the air did make an action upon that dust, as it were of chemistry; and the dust did boil and make a fizzing in the cup, and rose up and filled it with a liquid that was of simple water; yet very strange to see come that way; but ordinary after a time.

— Chapter VII

== The Dream of X ==
See main article

A greatly abridged version of the novel was first published in the United States in 1912 in chapbook form as Poems and a Dream of X (New York: R. H. Paget, 1912), in an extremely limited print run.

== Works influenced by The Night Land ==
The 1943 science fiction novel Earth's Last Citadel, by Henry Kuttner and C. L. Moore, was influenced by The Night Land: both novels depict a future Earth with humanity confined to a fortress.

== Sequels and other homages ==
An anthology edited by Andy W. Robertson, entitled William Hope Hodgson's Night Lands: Eternal Love (2003) and Nightmares of the Fall (2007) contain short stories set in a universe combining The Night Land with The House on the Borderland. A third anthology (to be titled The Days of Darkening) was planned but has not been published as of 2025. The first collection was nominated for a British Fantasy Award for Best Anthology by the British Fantasy Society in 2004.

James Stoddard's The Night Land, A Story Retold (2011) is a rewrite of the original intended for modern readers who may be unwilling to read the archaic language of the original. Unlike the original novel, it names the protagonist, and adds dialogue between characters, the original version having had none. An early draft of the second chapter of Stoddard's rewrite appears in William Hope Hodgson's Night Lands: Eternal Love.

Awake in the Night Land (2014) is a new collection of stories set in the world of Night Land written by John C. Wright, published by Castalia House.

Works of fan fiction (as well as fan art and music) has also been collected on a Night Land website based in the UK.

== Bibliography ==
- Bleiler, Everett (1948). The Checklist of Fantastic Literature. Chicago: Shasta Publishers. p. 150.
- Hodgson, William Hope. The Night Land. Doylestown, Pennsylvania: Wildside Press. (A recent hardcover reprint.)
