= The Ghost Pirates =

Novel written by William Hope Hodgson

- Cover of The Ghost Pirates
- Author: William Hope Hodgson
- Language: English
- Genre: Horror
- Publisher: Stanley Paul
- Publication date: 1909
- Publication place: United Kingdom
- Media type: Print (hardcover)
- Pages: 276

The Ghost Pirates is a horror novel by English writer William Hope Hodgson, first published in 1909.

In it, Hodgson never describes in detail the ghosts – if this is indeed what they are, since their true nature is left ambiguous – he merely reports on their gradual commandeering of the ship.

== Story ==
The novel is presented as the transcribed testimony of Jessop, who we ultimately discover is the only survivor of the final voyage of the Mortzestus, having been rescued from drowning by the crew of the passing Sangier. It begins with Jessop's recounting how he came to be aboard the ill-fated Mortzestus and the rumors surrounding the vessel.

Jessop then begins to recount the unusual events that rapidly increase in both frequency and severity. In the telling of his tale, Jessop offers only sparse interpretation of the events, spending most of the time relating the story in an almost journalistic fashion, presenting a relatively unvarnished description of the events and conversations as they occurred.

He describes his confusion and uncertainty about what he believes he has seen, at times fearing for his own sanity. He eventually hears other members of the crew speak of strange events, most of which the rest of the crew pass off as either bad luck or the result of the witness being either tired or "dotty". Jessop only offers brief personal interpretation; he states that while he cannot discount the idea that the beings plaguing the ship may be ghosts, he presents his theory that they may be beings from another dimension that, while sharing the same physical space as theirs, are normally completely separated to the extent that neither dimension is aware of the existence of the other. He offers only vague, superficial suggestions as to the cause of his theorized dimensional breach.

== Style ==
The seafaring jargon, coupled with the phonetically rendered dialects of some of the crew, make the text at times somewhat opaque, while at the same time lending it an air of authenticity and believability. Through the use of compactly written prose and simple, almost offhand foreshadowing, Hodgson gradually increases the suspense and sense of dread. Added to this is the fact that the beings invading the ship are neither described in any detail nor explained as to their origin or motive. The combination of these literary devices allows Hodgson to amplify the feeling of impending doom until the moment of the novel's unavoidable climax, when the "sea-devils", as Lovecraft describes them, pull the Mortzestus beneath the waves.

== Reception ==
The economic style of writing has led horror writer Robert Weinberg to describe The Ghost Pirates as "one of the finest examples of the tightly written novel ever published."

H.P. Lovecraft commented "The Ghost Pirates . . . is a powerful account of a doomed and haunted ship on its last voyage, and of the terrible sea-devils (of quasi-human aspect, and perhaps the spirits of bygone buccaneers) that besiege it and finally drag it down to an unknown fate. With its command of maritime knowledge, and its clever selection of hints and incidents suggestive of latent horrors in nature, this book at times reaches enviable peaks of power."
