= A Tropical Horror =

1905 short story by William Hope Hodgson

- Short story by William Hope Hodgson

Text available at Wikisource
- Country: United Kingdom
- Genre: Short story

Publication
- Published in: The Grand Magazine
- Publication date: June 1905

"A Tropical Horror" is a short story by the English author William Hope Hodgson, first published in June 1905.

== Plot summary ==
In this story, a ship at sea is attacked by a giant, eel-like sea monster. The story is told from the point of view of the sole survivor, a young apprentice. The creature is aboard the ship for several days and gradually kills and/or eats the remainder of the crew. A second apprentice eventually succeeds in killing the creature, but he is killed in the process.

The end of the story is presented using a literary device in the form of a report from another ship, which has rescued the sole survivor. They validate his story, finding the ship damaged and the crew missing or dead.

This story was adapted into a comic by Gary Gianni in The Dark Horse Book of Monsters by Dark Horse Comics.
