= The Outsider and Others =

1939 collection of stories by H. P. Lovecraft

- Dust-jacket illustration by Virgil Finlay.
- Author: H. P. Lovecraft
- Cover artist: Virgil Finlay
- Language: English
- Genre: Fantasy, horror, science fiction
- Published: 1939 (Arkham House)
- Publication place: United States
- Media type: Print (hardback)
- Pages: 533

The Outsider and Others is a collection of stories by American writer H. P. Lovecraft. It was released in 1939 and was the first book published by Arkham House. 1,268 copies were printed. It went out of print early in 1944 and has never been reprinted.

The volume takes its name from the Lovecraft short story "The Outsider"; The Outsider and Other Stories was Lovecraft's preferred title for a short story collection considered, but never issued, by Farnsworth Wright. The stories for this volume were selected by August Derleth and Donald Wandrei. The dust jacket art was a montage of drawings by Virgil Finlay for Weird Tales magazine, of which only one or two had originally illustrated Lovecraft stories.

E. F. Bleiler describes the collection's publication as "the beginning of serious specialist publishing of fantastic fiction in America".

== Genesis ==
In late 1937, the death of Howard Phillips Lovecraft prompted his two friends, August Derleth and Donald Wandrei, to gather a collection of Lovecraft's best weird fiction from the pulp magazines into a memorial volume. After some attempts to place the omnibus volume with major hardcover publishers without any success, the two men realized that no publisher would be willing to take a chance with the collection. Derleth and Wandrei decided to form their own company, Arkham House (its name based on a town featured in many of Lovecraft's stories) with the expressed purpose of publishing all of Lovecraft's writings in hardcover. The omnibus volume was scheduled as the first offering from Arkham House, with a price of $5.00, while advance orders were accepted at $3.50 each. Even at that bargain price, only 150 orders were received for The Outsider and Others before its appearance in 1939.

The Outsider was printed by the George Banta Co. of Wisconsin, in an edition of 1268 copies. The book was over 550 pages long, with small print, and featured a jacket by noted fantasy artist Virgil Finlay. The omnibus sold slowly but steadily.

== Contents ==
The Outsider and Others contains the following tales:

1. "Howard Philips Lovecraft: Outsider", by August Derleth & Donald Wandrei
2. "Dagon"
3. "Polaris"
4. "Celephais"
5. "Hypnos"
6. "The Cats of Ulthar"
7. "The Strange High House in the Mist"
8. "The Statement of Randolph Carter"
9. "The Silver Key"
10. "Through the Gates of the Silver Key"
11. "The Outsider"
12. "The Music of Erich Zann"
13. "The Rats in the Walls"
14. "Cool Air"
15. "He"
16. "The Horror at Red Hook"
17. "The Temple"
18. "Arthur Jermyn"
19. "The Picture in the House"
20. "The Festival"
21. "The Terrible Old Man"
22. "The Tomb"
23. "The Shunned House"
24. "In the Vault"
25. "Pickman's Model"
26. "The Haunter of the Dark"
27. "The Dreams in the Witch-House"
28. "The Thing on the Doorstep"
29. "The Nameless City"
30. "The Lurking Fear"
31. "The Call of Cthulhu"
32. "The Colour out of Space"
33. "The Dunwich Horror"
34. "The Whisperer in Darkness"
35. "The Shadow Over Innsmouth"
36. "The Shadow out of Time"
37. "At the Mountains of Madness"
38. "Supernatural Horror in Literature"

While the stories in the collection have appeared in other Lovecraft books, The Outsider and Others has never been reprinted in its original form.

== Reception ==
E. F. Bleiler called Outsider "a major book in the history of American supernatural fiction", saying Lovecraft's writing "reveals a vivid imagination, a remarkable ability at the creation of mythic thought, an excellent command of scholarly detail, and many of the indescribable characteristics of a powerful mind at work. Thrilling Wonder Stories hailed the collection as "a magnificent tribute to the brilliance of H. P. Lovecraft" and declared it "a milestone in fantasy literature, equal almost in importance to the collected tales of Edgar Allan Poe.

== In popular culture ==
The Outsider and Others is featured in August Derleth's stories The Dweller in Darkness and Beyond the Threshold.

== Sources ==
- Jaffery, Sheldon (1989). The Arkham House Companion. Mercer Island, WA: Starmont House, Inc. pp. 1–2. ISBN 1-55742-005-X.
- Chalker, Jack L.; Mark Owings (1998). The Science-Fantasy Publishers: A Bibliographic History, 1923-1998. Westminster, MD and Baltimore: Mirage Press, Ltd. p. 26.
- Nielsen, Leon (2004). Arkham House Books: A Collector's Guide. Jefferson, NC and London: McFarland & Company, Inc. pp. 46–47. ISBN 0-7864-1785-4.
