= Kingsport: The City in the Mists =

Horror tabletop role-playing game supplement

Kingsport
The City in the Mists
- Cover by John T. Snyder
- Designers: Kevin A. Ross
- Publishers: Chaosium
- Publication: 1991; 35 years ago
- Genres: Horror
- Systems: Basic Role-Playing
- ISBN: 978-0933635777

Kingsport: The City in the Mists is a supplement published by Chaosium in 1991 for the horror role-playing game Call of Cthulhu that describes a mysterious Massachusetts city, itself based on the work of H.P. Lovecraft.

== Description ==
Kingsport: The City in the Mists is a setting book which details the Massachusetts city of Kingsport. The book covers the village's dark history, notable Lovecraftian personalities and various points of interest. The book uses as its reference point Lovecraft's story The Strange High House in the Mist

The book also includes three adventures set in the city:

- The House on the Edge of Dreams: Following a storm, a house disappears.
- Dreams & Muses: Investigation following the suicide of a young artist.
- The Deadly Waters: Several mysterious disappearances at sea.

== Publication history ==
Chaosium first released the horror role-playing game Call of Cthulhu in 1981, and regularly refreshed it with new editions containing revamped rules. The fourth edition's release in 1989 sparked a line of superior products that game historian Stu Horvath called "the golden age for the line". These included Arkham Unveiled (1990), Return to Dunwich (1991), Escape from Innsmouth (1992), and Kingsport: The City in the Mists, the latter designed by Kevin A. Ross with contributions by Keith Herber and Scott Aniolowski, interior art by Gus DiZerega, Jason Eckhardt, and Carol Triplett-Smith, and cover art by John T. Snyder. Chaosium published it in 1991 as a 120-page softcover book with a pull-out map of Kingsport.

== Reception ==
In Issue 4 of The Unspeakable Oath, John Tynes was a bit disappointed in this product, writing, "The description of the town is really nice, but to some extent I guess I'd like to have seen more." Tyne also felt the information about the cult operating in Kingsport "could have really been developed a lot better for the 1920s rather than being treated, by and large, as an interesting but more or less irrelevant history lesson." Tyne thought the first scenario started well "But the execution falls flat." The second scenario was "by far the most peculiar." The third scenario Tyne found to be "a flat-out horror piece. There is a lot of good investigative work, and the final encounters are exceptionally deadly and frightening." Tyne concluded by giving the supplement a rating of 6.5 out of 10, saying, "All in all, Kingsport is a fine effort, and a good addition to the Lovecraft Country series. It [...] is enjoyable and has enough nuggets buried in it to spark some great ideas for role-playing."

Wayne Ligon reviewed Kingsport in White Wolf #30 (Feb., 1992), rating it a 3 out of 5 and stated that "Average is indeed the watchword here. Kingsport is simply an average offering, nothing badly done but with only occasional snatches of proper eeriness. Most of the 'meat' of the book is concerned with the effects of the Dreamlands upon the residents. Even the primary cult worships and obscure Outer God rather than one of the more powerful and extensive Mythos deities. If your Investigators are primarily dream travelers, then Kingsport may indeed be the book for you. For the rest, it is simply an average offering in an above-average series."

In Issue 186 of Dragon (October 1992), Rick Swan called the level of detail included in this book "lavish". However, he thought the three adventures, while they "make good use of the seaside setting," all relied "too heavily on dreams and not enough on Mythos-related encounters." Despite this, he recommended the book, saying, "Player characters will find plenty to do just wandering the streets and knocking on doors."

In his 2023 book Monsters, Aliens, and Holes in the Ground, RPG historian Stu Horvath noted the nearby nexus of the real world and dream world at the High House, and commented, "[Author Kevin] Ross uses that proximity to the sleeping world to infuse the entire city with a kind of dreaminess. The cosmic recedes while horrors more Romantic and Gothic step to the fore." Horvath concluded, "It is still a place of terrors, but the essence is unique when compared to the bulk of Call of Cthulhu's material."

== Other recognition ==
A copy of Kingsport is held in the Edwin and Terry Murray Collection of Role-Playing Games at Duke University.
