= Dream Cycle =

Short story series by H. P. Lovecraft

The Dream Cycle is a series of short stories and novellas by author H. P. Lovecraft (1890–1937). Written between 1918 and 1932, they are about the "Dreamlands", a vast alternate dimension that can only be entered via dreams. The Dreamlands are described as lying deeper than space, matter and time, and are a "limitless vacua beyond all thought and entity".

A map of Lovecraft's "Dreamworld" by Jack Gaughan (1967).

== Description ==
The Dreamlands are divided into four regions:

- The West contains the Steps of Deeper Slumber (descended via the "Cavern of Flame") and the Enchanted Woods, by which many enter the Dreamlands. Other points of interest include the port of Dylath-Leen, one of the Dreamlands' largest cities; the town of Ulthar, "where no man may kill a cat"; the massive mountain of Ngranek, where images of the Great ones are carved into the face; the coastal jungle city of Hlanith; and the desert trading capital Illarnek. Here lies the fabled Land of Mnar, whose gray stones are etched with signs and where rise the ruins of the great Sarnath.
- The South, home of the isle of Oriab and the areas known as the Fantastic Realms (described in "The White Ship").
- The East, home of Celephaïs, a city dreamt into being by its monarch Kuranes, greatest of all recorded dreamers, and the dangerous Forbidden Lands; the jasper teraces and temple of Kiran that slope down to meet the singing river Oukranos.
- The North, Home of the Onyx city of Inquanok and its numerous quarries, which no cat may sail to. Above Inquanok looms the feared “table land”, the Plateau of Leng, home of man-eating spiders and the satyr-like "Men of Leng".

Other locales include the Underworld, a subterranean region underneath the Dreamlands inhabited by various monsters; the Moon, accessible via a ship and inhabited by toad-like "moon-beasts" allied with Nyarlathotep; and Kadath, a huge castle atop a mountain and the domain of the "Great Ones", the gods of Earth's Dreamland.

Evidently all dreamers see the Dreamlands slightly differently, as Atal, High Priest of Ulthar, mentions that everyone has their own dreamland. In the same sentence he says the Dreamlands that many know is a "general land of vision".

The Dreamlands are described in Hypnos as beyond anything conceivable to humans, and of which only imaginative men can dream:

Of our studies it is impossible to speak, since they held so slight a connexion with anything of the world as living men conceive it. They were of that vaster and more appalling universe of dim entity and consciousness which lies deeper than matter, time, and space, and whose existence we suspect only in certain forms of sleep—those rare dreams beyond dreams which come never to common men, and but once or twice in the lifetime of imaginative men.

Continuing on, the Dreamlands are described as limitless and beyond all thought and entity:

There was a night when winds from unknown spaces whirled us irresistibly into limitless vacua beyond all thought and entity. Perceptions of the most maddeningly untransmissible sort thronged upon us; perceptions of infinity which at the time convulsed us with joy, yet which are now partly lost to my memory and partly incapable of presentation to others. Viscous obstacles were clawed through in rapid succession, and at length I felt that we had been borne to realms of greater remoteness than any we had previously known.

The Dreamlands are comparable to the physical cosmos, which in Lovecraftian cosmology, is itself vast and infinite in dimensions. The Dreamlands can transcend even these infinite dimensions, as human three-dimensional dreamers can communicate with dreamers of higher or lower dimensions. The Dreamlands are also beyond basic concepts such as time and gravitation, as demonstrated when in "Celephais", the human dreamer Kuranes is able to speak with a violet covered gas who merely identifies Kuranes as from a universe where "matter, energy, and gravitation exist". This is also described in the short story "The Trap", wherein the narrator is able to communicate with the boy Robert even after Robert is sucked through a mirror into a 4th dimensional reality. In fact, the Dreamlands seem to be where the physical cosmos originates from, as in "Hypnos", it is described how the physical cosmos is "born" from the Dreamlands "as a bubble is born from the pipe of a jester".

== Bibliography ==
- The Dream Cycle of H. P. Lovecraft: Dreams of Terror and Death. Del Rey, 1985.

Contents:
- "Polaris" (1918)
- "The White Ship" (1919)
- "The Doom That Came to Sarnath" (1919)
- "The Cats of Ulthar" (1920)
- "Celephaïs" (1920)
- "Ex Oblivione" (1920)
- "Nyarlathotep" (1920)
- "The Quest of Iranon" (1921)
- "The Nameless City" (reference only) (1921)
- "The Other Gods" (1921)
- "Azathoth" (1922)
- "The Hound" (reference only) (1922)
- "Hypnos" (1922)
- "What the Moon Brings" (1922)
- "The Outsider" (1926)
- "The Silver Key" (1926)
- "The Strange High House in the Mist" (1926)
- The Dream-Quest of Unknown Kadath (1927)
- The Case of Charles Dexter Ward (reference only) (1927)
- "The Thing in the Moonlight" (Based on a letter written to Donald Wandrei. Written by J. Chapman Miske) (1927. Published 1941)
- At the Mountains of Madness (reference only) (1931)
- "The Dreams in the Witch House" (roughly connected) (1932)
- "Through the Gates of the Silver Key" (with E. Hoffmann Price) (1932)

=== Other ===
- Myers, Gary (1975). House of the Worm. Sauk City, WI: Arkham House. ISBN 0-87054-071-8.
- Brian Lumley wrote books set in Lovecraft's Dreamlands as well, beginning with Hero of Dreams in 1989.
- Harms, Daniel (1998). "Dreamlands". The Encyclopedia Cthulhiana (2nd ed.). Oakland, CA: Chaosium. pp. 89–91. ISBN 1-56882-119-0.
- Jonathan L. Howard (2011). Johannes Cabal: The Fear Institute. Headline Publishing Group. ISBN 978-0755347995.
- Williams, Chris; Petersen, Sandy (2004). H.P. Lovecraft's Dreamlands: Roleplaying Beyond the Wall of Sleep (5th ed.). Hayward, CA: Chaosium. ISBN 1-56882-157-3.
- Myers, Gary (2013). The Country of the Worm: Excursions Beyond the Wall of Sleep. CreateSpace. ISBN 9781484801970.
- Multiple authors (2016). Kill Those Damn Cats: Cats of Ulthar Lovecraftian Anthology. First United Church of Cthulhu. ISBN 978-1535073677.
- Kij Johnson, 2016 The Dream Quest of Vellit Boe. Tor. ISBN 978-0765391414.
