= Lovecraft Country =

Real and fictitious locations in New England related to H. P. Lovecraft's fiction

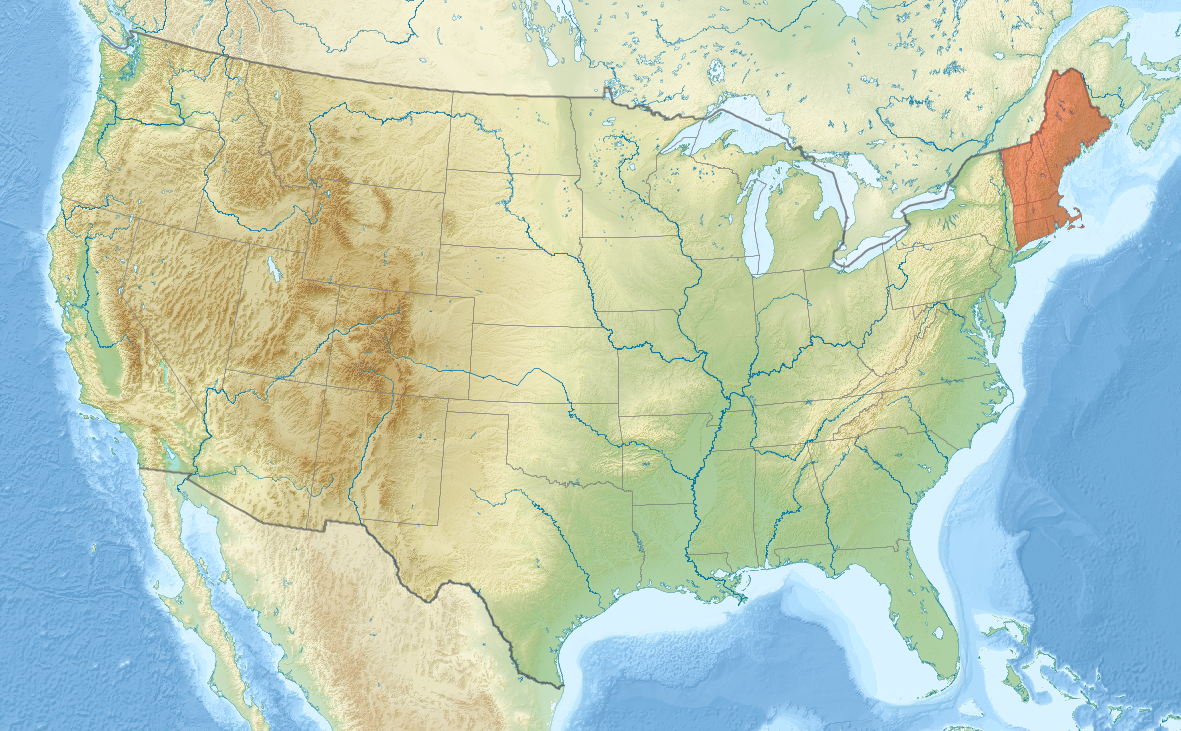
- This fictional region is located in the real New England area of the U.S.
- Created by: Keith Herber
- Genre: Horror fiction

In-universe information
- Type: Region
- Location: New England
- Locations: Arkham; Dunwich; Innsmouth; Kingsport

Lovecraft Country is a term coined for the New England setting used by H. P. Lovecraft in many of his weird fiction stories, which combines real and fictional locations. This setting has been elaborated on by other writers working in the Cthulhu Mythos. The phrase was not in use during Lovecraft's own lifetime; it was coined by Keith Herber for the Lovecraftian role-playing game Call of Cthulhu.

The phrase is one of several attempts to label the setting of Lovecraft's works. Alternative phrases include Arkham County, Miskatonic County, and the Miskatonic region.

== Origin ==
The term was coined by Keith Herber and then popularized by Chaosium, the producers of the Lovecraftian role-playing game Call of Cthulhu.

=== Alternative phrases ===
Lovecraft scholar S. T. Joshi refers to the area as the Miskatonic region, after its fictional river and university. Lovecraft biographer Lin Carter calls it Miskatonic County, and the film Color Out of Space refers to it as Arkham County, although Lovecraft indicates that at least some of his fictional towns were located in the real-life Essex County of Massachusetts. Just as Arkham County is fictitious, Matt Ruff places some of the events of his book Lovecraft Country in the equally fictitious Devon County of Massachusetts.

== Lovecraft's fiction ==
Setting plays a major role in Lovecraft's fiction. Lovecraft Country, a fictionalized version of New England, serves as a central hub for his mythos. It represents the history, culture, and folklore of the region, as interpreted by Lovecraft, who associated himself with the region. These attributes are exaggerated and altered to provide a base upon which his stories could be constructed. The names of the locations in the region were directly influenced by the names of real locations in the region, which was done to increase their realism. Lovecraft's stories use their connections with New England to imbue themselves with the ability to instill fear.

Lovecraft first used a New England setting in his 1920 short story "The Terrible Old Man", set in Kingsport. "The Picture in the House" (written later in 1920), is the first of his stories to mention both Arkham and the Miskatonic Valley. The story begins with a manifesto for why the New England countryside is a fitting backdrop for his horror stories:

the true epicure of the terrible, to whom a new thrill of unutterable ghastliness is the chief end and justification of existence, esteem most of all the ancient, lonely farmhouses of backwoods New England; for there the dark elements of strength, solitude, grotesqueness, and ignorance combine to form the perfection of the hideous.

In a 1930 letter to Robert E. Howard, Lovecraft attempted to explain his fascination with New England as a setting for weird fiction: "It is the night-black Massachusetts legendary which packs the really macabre 'kick'. Here is material for a really profound study in group neuroticism; for certainly, none can deny the existence of a profoundly morbid streak in the Puritan imagination."

Specifically, Lovecraft was inspired by the cities and towns in Massachusetts. However, the specific location of Lovecraft Country is variable, as it was moved according to Lovecraft's literary needs. The location of Arkham was moved, as Lovecraft decided that it would have been destroyed by the Quabbin Reservoir, which was created to supply Boston with fresh water. This is alluded to in "The Colour Out of Space", as the "blasted heath" is submerged by the creation of a fictionalized version of the reservoir.

Lovecraft first mentioned Arkham's Miskatonic University in "Herbert West–Reanimator", written in 1921–22. He added Dunwich to his imaginary landscape in 1928's "The Dunwich Horror", and expanded it to include Innsmouth in 1931's The Shadow over Innsmouth. Other Lovecraft stories that make use of Lovecraft Country settings include "The Festival", "The Colour out of Space", "The Strange High House in the Mist", "The Dreams in the Witch House", and "The Thing on the Doorstep".

== Derleth's additions ==
August Derleth, Lovecraft's friend, discouraged other Cthulhu Mythos writers from setting their stories in Lovecraft's New England. But he himself attempted to fill in the blanks of the setting, particularly in his posthumous "collaborations" with Lovecraft—actually Derleth's stories based on fragments, notes or ideas that Lovecraft left behind after his death. The Lurker at the Threshold is set in Billington's Wood, a fictional forest north of Arkham, while "Witches' Hollow" takes place in the titular valley in the hills to the west of the town.

The title of "The Fisherman of Falcon Point" refers to a promontory on the Atlantic coast south of Innsmouth. "Wentworth's Day" and "The Horror from the Middle Span" take place in the area north of Dunwich, while "The Gable Window" concerns a house on the Aylesbury Pike.

== Other uses ==
While the phrase originated in the role-playing community, it now sees widespread usage.

Lovecraft Country was the title of a 2016 novel by Matt Ruff. The novel was subsequently adapted by HBO for television. The resulting TV series, also called Lovecraft Country, premiered in August 2020.

Return to Lovecraft Country was a collection of short stories set in "the New England of H.P. Lovecraft", published by Triad Entertainments in 1996. The editor, Scott David Aniolowski, has also done editorial work for Chaosium. Eternal Lovecraft, a short-story collection published by Golden Gryphon Press in 1998, has a section called "Lovecraft Country".

The phrase occurs in popular discussions of Lovecraft's connection to the region. The Harvard Law Record used the phrase in an October 20, 2005, article:

Many Lovecraft stories take place in "Lovecraft Country"—the fictional North Shore towns of Arkham, Innsmouth, Kingsport, and Dunwich (perhaps fictional equivalents of Ipswich, Salem/Danvers, Marblehead, or Newburyport).

== Fictional locations in Lovecraft Country ==
The most important portion stretches along the Miskatonic River valley, from Dunwich in its far western headwaters to its mouth entering the Atlantic Ocean between Arkham, Kingsport, and Martin's Beach. These locations, along with Innsmouth, are the most significant locations in Lovecraft Country. However, as certain Lovecraft stories take place in other areas of New England, including southern hills of Vermont (the setting of The Whisperer in Darkness) as well as Lovecraft's hometown of Providence, Rhode Island, where he set such works as The Case of Charles Dexter Ward and "The Haunter of the Dark", this broader area is sometimes to also be considered part of Lovecraft Country.

=== Arkham ===
The fictional Massachusetts city of Arkham is featured in many of Lovecraft's stories, and those of other Cthulhu Mythos writers.

Arkham, in the Miskatonic River Valley, is the home of Miskatonic University, an institution which finances the expeditions in the novellas, At the Mountains of Madness (1936) and The Shadow Out of Time (1936). Arkham Sanitarium appears in the short story "The Thing on the Doorstep". It is said in "Herbert West—Reanimator" that the town was devastated by a typhoid outbreak in 1905. The precise location of Arkham is unspecified in Lovecraft's work, although it is assumed to be close to both Innsmouth and Dunwich.

In a letter to F. Lee Baldwin dated April 29, 1934, Lovecraft wrote that "[my] mental picture of Arkham is of a town something like Salem in atmosphere [and] style of houses, but more hilly [and] with a college (which Salem [lacks]) ... I place the town [and] the imaginary Miskatonic [River] somewhere north of Salem—perhaps near Manchester."

=== Dunwich ===
Dunwich
- First appearance: The Dunwich Horror (1929)
- Created by: H. P. Lovecraft
- Genre: Horror fiction

In-universe information
- Location: New England

Dunwich is a fictional village that appeared in the H. P. Lovecraft novella "The Dunwich Horror" (1929), and is also located in Miskatonic River Valley. The inhabitants are depicted as inbred, uneducated, and very superstitious, while the town itself is described as economically poor with many decrepit or abandoned buildings. Although Dunwich in Suffolk, England is pronounced "DUN-ich," Lovecraft never specified how he preferred his Dunwich be pronounced.

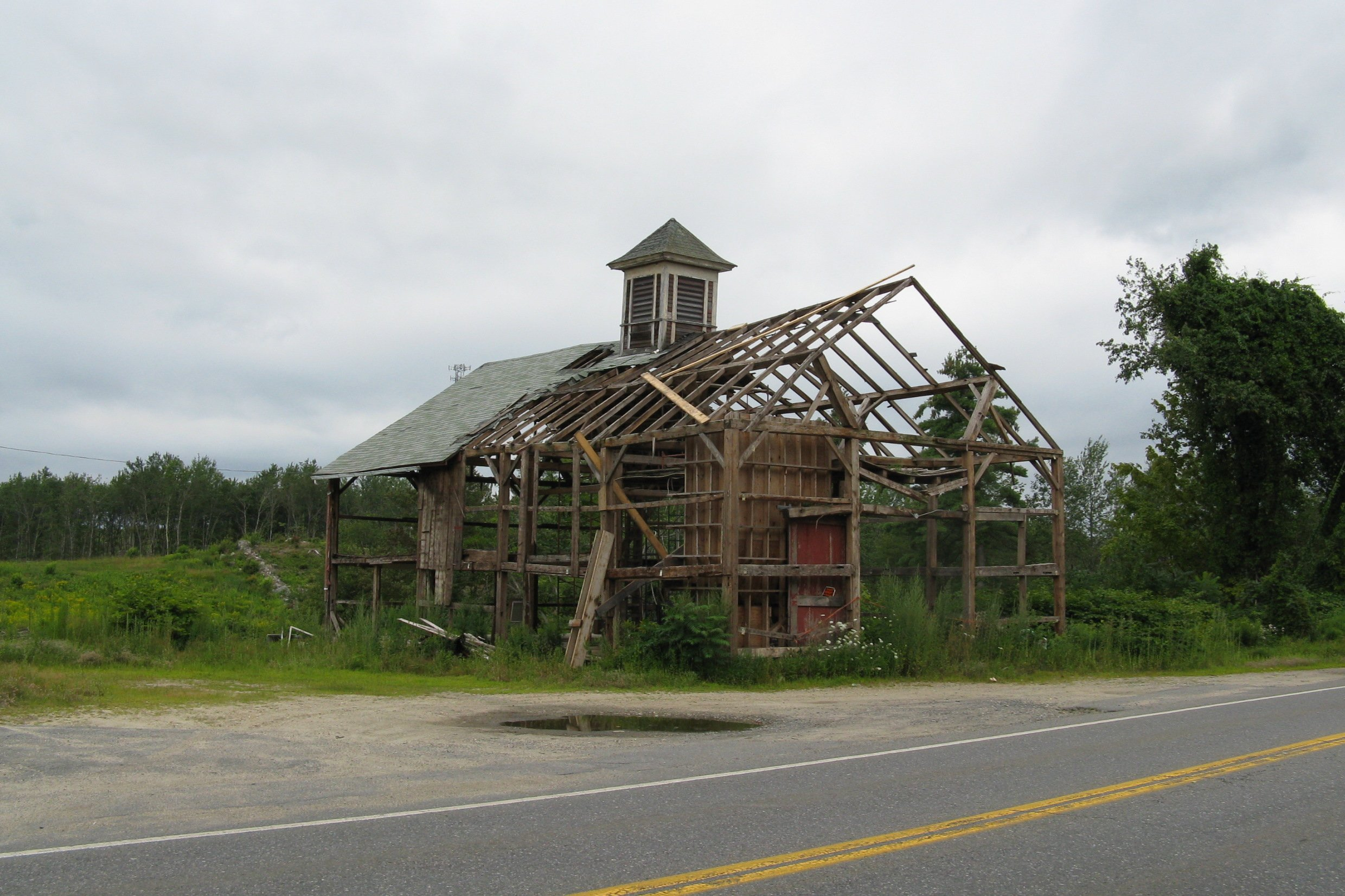
An abandoned barn in Athol, Massachusetts, said to have been one of the towns that inspired Lovecraft's Dunwich

Lovecraft is said to have based Dunwich on Athol, Massachusetts, and other towns in Western Massachusetts, with him specifically citing "the decadent Massachusetts countryside around Springfield – say Wilbraham, Monson, and Hampden." S. T. Joshi has also seen Dunwich as being influenced by East Haddam, Connecticut, location of the "Devil's Hopyard", the "Moodus Noises", and a witch tradition.

Lovecraft places Dunwich in "north central Massachusetts", found by travellers "tak[ing] the wrong fork at the junction of the Aylesbury pike just beyond Dean's Corners." Aylesbury and Dean's Corners are both Lovecraft creations, neither of which appears in any other of his stories, though Aylesbury is mentioned in his poem sequence Fungi From Yuggoth.

Dunwich is described as being surrounded by "great rings of rough-hewn stone columns on the hilltops", which are presumed to have been built by the Pocumtucks.

=== Innsmouth ===
Innsmouth
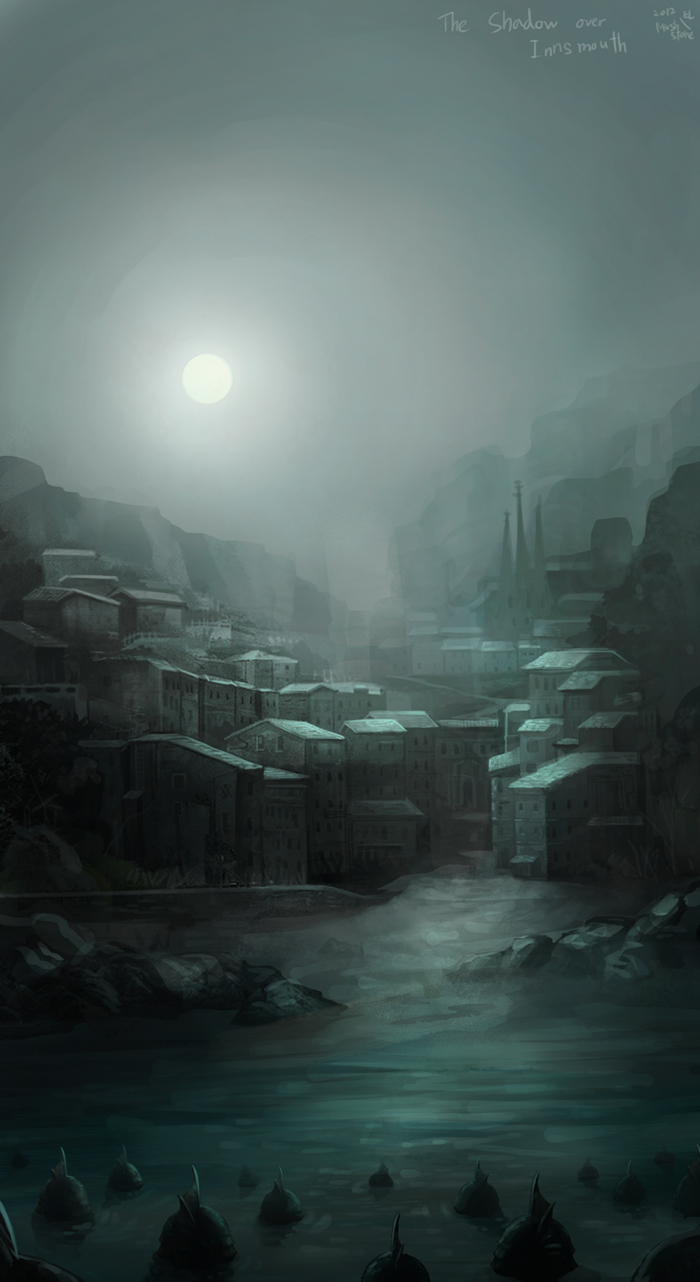
- First appearance: Celephaïs (1920)
- Created by: H. P. Lovecraft
- Genre: Horror fiction

In-universe information
- Location: New England

Innsmouth (/ˈɪnzməθ/) is a setting of The Shadow over Innsmouth (written 1931, published 1936), and referenced in later works. Lovecraft first used the name "Innsmouth" in his 1920 short story "Celephaïs" (1920), where it refers to a fictional village in England. Lovecraft's more famous Innsmouth is in Massachusetts. This latter Innsmouth was first identified in two of his cycle of sonnets Fungi from Yuggoth. Lovecraft called Innsmouth "a considerably twisted version of Newburyport."

Lovecraft placed Innsmouth on the coast of Essex County, Massachusetts, south of Plum Island and north of Cape Ann. The town of Ipswich, Massachusetts is said to be a near neighbor, where many Innsmouth residents do their shopping; Rowley, Massachusetts, another neighboring town, is said to be to the northwest. This would place Innsmouth in the vicinity of Essex Bay. The description of the fictional Massachusetts village is said to be based on the real fishing town of Fleetwood, Lancashire which bears a marked resemblance to the description of the village.

Neil Gaiman's short story "Shoggoth's Old Peculiar" explains that the American Innsmouth was named after an older English village.

Lovecraft writes that Innsmouth is in a horrendous state of decay, with many of the buildings rotting and on the point of collapse. The town was "founded in 1643, noted for shipbuilding before the American Revolution, a seat of great marine prosperity in the early nineteenth century, and later a minor factory center." The loss of sailors in shipwrecks, and the War of 1812, caused the town's profitable trade with the South Seas to falter; by 1828, the only fleet still running that route was that of Captain Obed Marsh, the head of one of the town's leading families.

Prior to the events of the story, in 1840, Marsh starts a cult in Innsmouth known as the Esoteric Order of Dagon, based on a religion he had learned from certain Polynesian islanders in his travels. The town's fishing industry soon experienced a great upsurge. Then in 1846, a mysterious plague struck the town, killing most of the population, but in reality, the deaths were caused by the Deep Ones in league with Obed Marsh. When Marsh and his followers were arrested, the sacrificial rites ceased and the Deep Ones retaliated. The cult activity resumed, and interbreeding increased, spawning deformed fish-humans. Consequently, Innsmouth was shunned for many years, until 1927 when it came under investigation by federal authorities for alleged bootlegging.

The next year, an incursion by the authorities detonated explosives in Devil Reef off the coast. The villagers were arrested and disappeared mysteriously in government custody.

=== Kingsport ===
Kingsport
- First appearance: The Terrible Old Man (1920)
- Created by: H. P. Lovecraft
- Genre: Horror fiction

In-universe information
- Location: New England

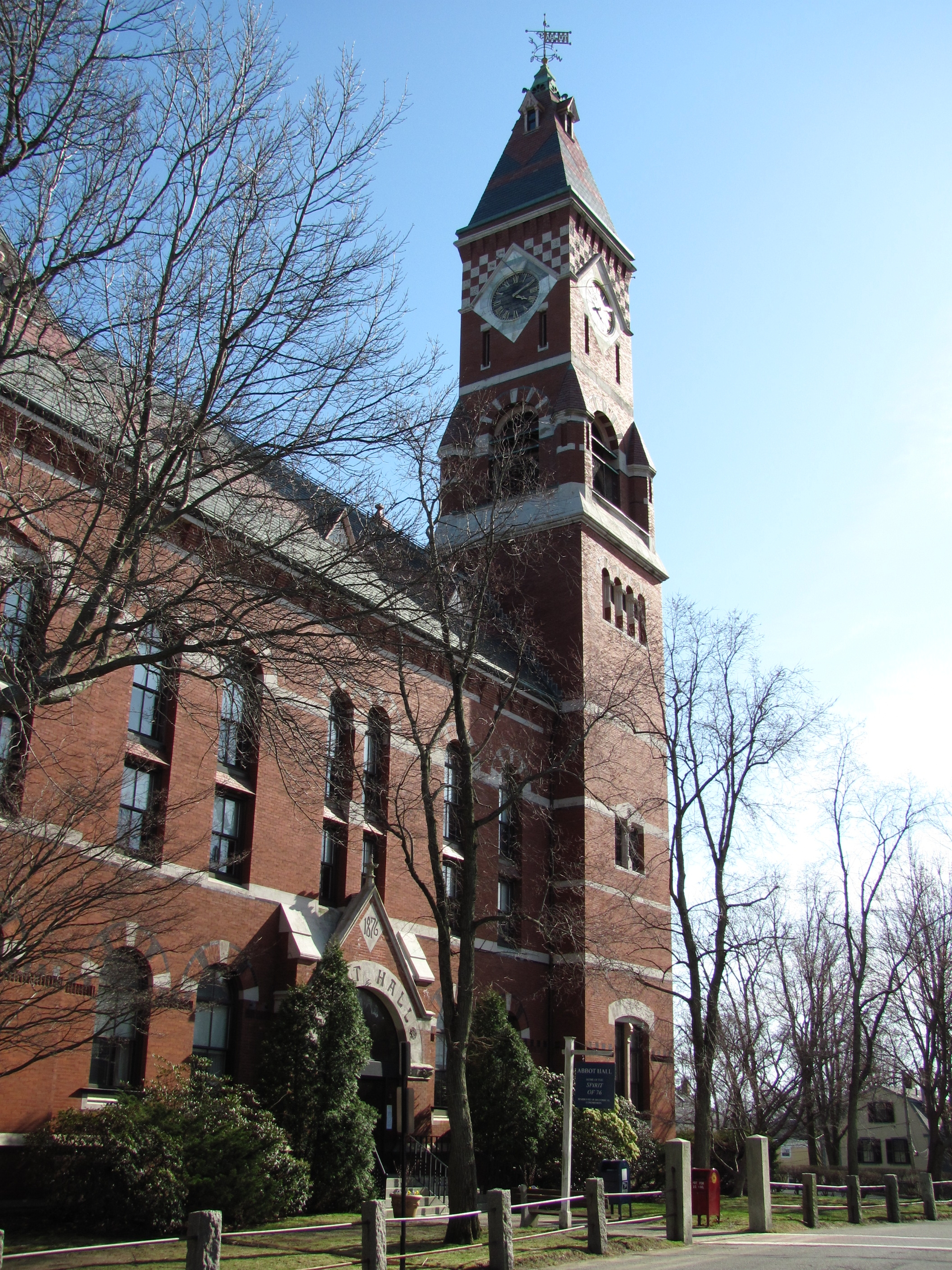
Abbot Hall in Marblehead, Massachusetts. Lovecraft based Kingsport on the town of Marblehead.

The town of Kingsport first appeared in Lovecraft's 1920 short story "The Terrible Old Man". Kingsport is based on Marblehead, Massachusetts, a town bordering Salem. In his letters, Lovecraft described Kingsport as being an idealized version of Marblehead. Its rocky cliffs were based on those in Marblehead and Rockport. Kingsport is, according to Will Murray, adjacent to Innsmouth. The town's exact location moved around according to Lovecraft's literary needs.

Lovecraft created Kingsport before he saw its real-life model. When Lovecraft visited Marblehead in 1922, he became enamored of the town. In 1929 he wrote with much feeling of seeing the snow-covered town at sunset and of experiencing his "first stupefying glance of MARBLEHEAD'S huddled and archaick roofs". Indeed, "that instant—about 4:05 to 4:10 pm., Dec. 17, 1922—[was] the most powerful single emotional climax during my nearly forty years of existence."

Lovecraft used Kingsport as a setting for his short stories "The Terrible Old Man" (written 1920, published 1921), "The Festival" (written 1923, published 1925), and "The Strange High House in the Mist" (1926, published 1931). A reprise of Lovecraft's epiphany appeared in fictional form at the end of Lovecraft's "The Dream-Quest of Unknown Kadath" (1926-7, published posthumously in 1943). "Dream-Quest" featured Lovecraft's recurring character of Randolph Carter, popularly thought of as an idealized representation of Lovecraft himself. Carter, by Lovecraft's account, grew up in Kingsport.

In the works of later writers, the town of Kingsport is described as having been founded in 1639 by colonists from southern England and the Channel Islands, where it soon became a seaport and center for shipbuilding. Influenced by the Salem witch trials, the town hanged four alleged witches in 1692. During the American Revolutionary War, the port was briefly blockaded by the British when the town's merchants turned to privateering against the British fleet. In the 19th century, sea trade dwindled and the town turned to fishing as the main industry. Kingsport's economy continued to dwindle into the 20th century and today relies primarily on tourism.

=== Manuxet River ===
The Manuxet River is a fictional river that runs through Massachusetts and empties into the sea at the town of Innsmouth. Although there is a Manuxet River in Worcester, Massachusetts, Will Murray believes that Lovecraft based his fictional Manuxet on the Merrimack River and probably invented the name from root words of an Algonquian language.

To support his claim, Murray gives two reasons. First, even though Newburyport was an inspiration for Innsmouth, it is clearly a separate location since Lovecraft himself placed the real-life Newburyport to the north of Innsmouth in "The Shadow Over Innsmouth". Murray thinks Lovecraft actually based Innsmouth's location on Gloucester, Massachusetts on Cape Ann. Secondly, Lovecraft is known to have created the name of the Miskatonic River from Algonquian root words. Murray believes Lovecraft used a similar method to come up with Manuxet: man means "island" and uxet translates to "at the large part of the river"; thus, when combined Manuxet means "Island at the large part of the river". Murray contends that this meaning is well suited to Innsmouth's placement at the mouth of the Manuxet. And Cape Ann itself (the presumed site of Innsmouth) is connected to the mainland by only a thin strip of land and might be thought of as an island.

== Call of Cthulhu RPG ==
Game historian Stu Horvath defined four products published by Chaosium between 1990 and 1992 as "Lovecraft Country": Arkham Unveiled (1990), Return to Dunwich (1991), Kingsport: The City in the Mists (1991), and Escape from Innsmouth (1992), calling them collectively "a massive collection of secrets and horrors."

== Sources ==
- Butler, James O. (August 2014). "Terror and Terrain: The Environmental Semantics of Lovecraft County". Lovecraft Annual (8): 131–149. ISSN 1935-6102. JSTOR 26868485.
- Carter, Lin (1976). Lovecraft: A Look Behind the "Cthulhu Mythos". New York: Ballantine Books. ISBN 0-345-25295-0. OCLC 20175226.
- Emrys, Ruthanna; Pillsworth, Anne M. (November 23, 2016). "Toto, I Don't Think We're In Arkham Anymore: Matt Ruff's 'Lovecraft Country'". Tor Books. Archived from the original on May 20, 2020.
- Harms, Daniel (1998). "Kingsport". The Encyclopedia Cthulhiana (Second ed.). Oakland, California: Chaosium. pp. 166–167. ISBN 1-56882-119-0. OCLC 40004877.
- Joshi, S. T. (2001). A Dreamer and a Visionary: H. P. Lovecraft in His Time. Oxford University Press. ISBN 978-1-78138-644-6. Archived from the original on December 3, 2020.
- Joshi, S. T.; Schultz, David E. (2001). An H. P. Lovecraft Encyclopedia. Westport, Connecticut: Greenwood Publishing Group. ISBN 978-0-313-31578-7. OCLC 608158798.
- Loucks, Donovan K. (2001). "Antique Dreams: Marblehead and Lovecraft's Kingsport" (PDF). Lovecraft Studies. Archived (PDF) from the original on September 25, 2020 – via The H. P. Lovecraft Archive.
- Lovecraft, H. P. (1999). Joshi, S. T.; Cannon, Peter (eds.). More Annotated H. P. Lovecraft. New York: Dell Publishing. ISBN 0-440-50875-4. OCLC 41231274.
- Lovecraft, H. P. (1997). Joshi, S. T. (ed.). The Annotated H. P. Lovecraft. New York: Dell Publishing. ISBN 0-440-50660-3. OCLC 36165172.
- Lovecraft, H. P. (August 20, 2009) [written 1932]. "The Dreams in the Witch House". The H. P. Lovecraft Archive. Archived from the original on May 13, 2020.
- Lovecraft, H. P. (August 20, 2009) [written 1928]. "The Dunwich Horror". The H. P. Lovecraft Archive. Archived from the original on August 3, 2020.
- Lovecraft, Howard P. (1984) [1929]. "The Dunwich Horror". In S. T. Joshi (ed.). The Dunwich Horror and Others (9th corrected printing ed.). Sauk City, WI: Arkham House. ISBN 0-87054-037-8. Definitive version.
- Lovecraft, Howard P. (August 1997). "The Dunwich Horror". In S. T. Joshi (ed.). The Annotated H. P. Lovecraft. New York, NY: Dell. ISBN 0-440-50660-3.
- Lovecraft, H. P. (August 20, 2009) [written 1920]. "The Picture in the House". The H. P. Lovecraft Archive. Archived from the original on May 29, 2020.
- Lovecraft, H. P. (August 20, 2009) [written 1931]. "The Shadow Over Innsmouth". The H. P. Lovecraft Archive. Archived from the original on August 7, 2013.
- Murray, Will (1986). "In Search of Arkham Country". Lovecraft Studies. 5 (2): 54–67.
- Murray, Will (1991–1992). "Lovecraft's Arkham Country". Books at Brown. 38–39: 19–29. Archived from the original on August 3, 2020 – via Brown Digital Repository.
- Murray, Will (1988). "I Found Innsmouth!". Crypt of Cthulhu. 7 (7): 10–14. Robert M. Price (ed.), Mount Olive, NC: Cryptic Publications.
- Murray, Will (1990). "Roots of the Manuxet". Crypt of Cthulhu. 9 (8): 34. Robert M. Price (ed.), Upper Montclair, NJ: Cryptic Publications.
- "Spirit of Lovecraft Haunts Cambridge, New England". Harvard Law Record. October 21, 2005. Archived from the original on August 3, 2020.

=== Books ===
- Harms, Daniel (1998). "Esoteric Order of Dagon". The Encyclopedia Cthulhiana (2nd ed.). Oakland, CA: Chaosium. pp. 103–4. ISBN 1-56882-119-0.

—"Innsmouth", pp. 149–50. Ibid.

- Lovecraft, Howard P. (1999) [1936]. "The Shadow Over Innsmouth". In S. T. Joshi (ed.). The Call of Cthulhu and Other Weird Stories. London, UK; New York, NY: Penguin Books. ISBN 0-14-118234-2.
- Lovecraft, Howard P. (1984) [1936]. "The Shadow Over Innsmouth". In S. T. Joshi (ed.). The Dunwich Horror and Others (9th corrected printing ed.). Sauk City, WI: Arkham House. ISBN 0-87054-037-8. Definitive version.
- Lovecraft, Howard P. (1998). Selected Letters III. Sauk City, WI: Arkham House. ISBN 0-87054-032-7.
- Lovecraft, Howard P. (1976). Selected Letters V. Sauk City, WI: Arkham House. ISBN 0-87054-036-X.
