= Call of Cthulhu: Dark Corners of the Earth =

2005 horror game

- Developer: Headfirst Productions
- Publishers: Bethesda Softworks; 2K (Xbox); Ubisoft (PC, Europe)
- Directors: Simon Woodroffe; Michael Woodroffe
- Producers: Christopher Gray; Todd Vaughn; Joss Ellis
- Designer: Christopher Gray
- Programmers: Gareth Clarke; David White
- Artists: Rob Steptoe; Troy Tempest; Wilhelm Ogterop
- Writers: Christopher Gray; Graeme Davis
- Composer: Greg Chandler
- Platforms: Xbox, Windows
- Release: Xbox: NA: October 24, 2005; EU: October 28, 2005; Windows: EU: March 24, 2006; NA: April 26, 2006
- Genre: Survival horror
- Mode: Single-player

Call of Cthulhu: Dark Corners of the Earth is a survival horror video game developed by Headfirst Productions for the Xbox in 2005 and for Windows in 2006. It combines an action-adventure game with a relatively realistic first-person shooter and elements of a stealth game.

The game is based on the works of H. P. Lovecraft, author of "The Call of Cthulhu" and progenitor of the Cthulhu Mythos. It is a reimagining of Lovecraft's 1936 novella The Shadow over Innsmouth, taking large inspiration from another novella called The Shadow Out of Time as well as Chaosium's Call of Cthulhu role-playing game 1997 scenario Escape from Innsmouth. Set mostly in the year 1922, the story follows Jack Walters, a mentally unstable private detective hired to investigate in Innsmouth, a strange and mysterious town that has cut itself off from the rest of the United States.

In development since 1999, the project was repeatedly delayed, going through several revisions and having some of its most ambitious and immersive features abandoned and the initially planned PlayStation 2 version cancelled. Although well received by critics, Dark Corners of the Earth was a commercial failure. At least two more Cthulhu Mythos games were planned by Headfirst Productions, including a direct sequel titled Call of Cthulhu: Destiny's End, but neither were completed due to Headfirst's bankruptcy.

== Gameplay ==
The game's heads-up display in first-person view presentation lacks typical first-person shooter features such as ammo and health indicators or aiming reticle.

Initial gameplay of Call of Cthulhu: Dark Corners of the Earth comprises unarmed escape and evasion together with investigative exploration, although first-person shooter (FPS) style combat is introduced later on. As with most survival horror video games, ammunition is limited and must be conserved carefully for situations when it will really be indispensable, occasionally requiring the player to avoid combat even when armed. The game as a whole is heavily scripted and very linear, with only one path through the chapters from start to finish, in contrast with some earlier survival horror games such as the original Alone in the Dark (which itself was inspired by the Mythos).

The game features no heads-up display (HUD). Instead, condition of the player character is relayed through the sound cues of his heartbeat and breathing, which become more pronounced when wounded, and color draining from the screen with loss of blood and strength. Specific injuries are also indicated visually and aurally: for example, a broken leg causes the character to limp while making appropriate noises, while a broken arm makes aiming more difficult. The health system was designed as a more realistic take on character injury than other games of its genre in that different wounds, including poisoning and bleeding, require different remedies, such as a splint for a broken leg. The inventory screen shows the character's injuries (displayed on his character model) and all carried items.

The player's character gradually loses sanity when he looks directly at upsetting aspects of the game world. The character's mental degradation can lead him to hearing hallucinations and visions, which manifest as graphical anomalies and sound distortion, and changes in control sensitivity. If the character becomes too unsettled, results may include his permanent insanity or suicide, and a game over. The sanity can be restored through finding areas of sanctuary or defeating enemies. The areas marked with the Elder Signs serve as sanctuaries against the enemies and as save points. To enhance its replayability value, the game features a system whereby players can gain Mythos Points, supposed to reflect a level of gained knowledge. Such points can be used to unlock in-game bonuses, such as additional information and items.

Most of the ranged weapons are based on real firearms like Smith & Wesson M1917, Colt M1911, Double-barreled shotgun, M1903 Springfield, Thompson submachine gun with the exception of a Yithian directed-energy weapon introduced at the end of the game. The player character can also perform a melee attack with a crowbar, a knife or with a gun if all ammunition for it has been used up. The game features a realistic combat system: due to lack of HUD, the player has to count shots manually to know when the gun goes empty. There is also no artificial on-screen targeting reticle; instead, the player must aim through the iron sights on the weapons themselves, but sustained aiming tires the character and drops accuracy. The shooting system is unique in that fired rounds go exactly where the gun's barrel is pointing. For example, if the player character readies a reloaded weapon and the player pulls the trigger before the character animation has finished, the round will be discharged in the direction the gun was pointing when the shot was fired.

== Plot ==
On September 6, 1915, police detective Jack Walters (Milton Lawrence) is summoned to the siege of a decrepit manor house in Boston. The manor is inhabited by a bizarre cult called the Fellowship of the Yith, led by one Victor Holt (Marc Biagi) who has asked specifically for Walters to come and talk to him. Taking cover from an ensuing firefight, Walters separates from the police and goes inside the mansion. He finds the cultists dead by mass suicide and turns on a strange-looking contraption, revealing itself to be a portal. Walters sees two inter-dimensional beings emerge from the portal and blacks out. When the rest of the police finally break in, they find Walters apparently insane and with a different personality. He is briefly committed to Arkham Asylum, but is released and spends six years travelling and studying the occult. Exactly six years since entering the manor in Boston, his secondary personality disappears and his old personality returns. However, he suffers from amnesia surrounding the events of the past six years.

Walters becomes a private detective, whilst attempting to trace his own actions during the period of mental disturbance that he cannot remember. On February 6, 1922, he takes up a missing person case at Innsmouth, a xenophobic coastal town, and the site of the recent disappearance of Brian Burnham, a clerk that had been sent there to establish a local store for the First National Grocery chain. Arriving in the isolated town, which appears to be depopulated and in a state of collapse, Jack unsuccessfully asks around for Burnham. He stays the night at a hotel, where he barely escapes an assassination attempt and flees from a chase by an armed mob. From that point forward, Jack is forced to sneak through the alleys, buildings, and sewers of Innsmouth, avoiding murderous patrols of the town's corrupt police and the cultists looking for him. He acquires weapons to defend himself and meets undercover agent Lucas Mackey (John Nutten), who tells him that the town is under federal investigation. Jack eventually finds Burnham and his girlfriend Ruth (Lani Minella), but the two are killed as they escape from Innsmouth. Jack is taken in by the FBI squad led by J. Edgar Hoover (Ryan Drummond). Following a brutal interrogation, Jack agrees to help Hoover and the FBI raid the Marsh Gold Refinery, where he is attacked by an ancient creature known as a shoggoth and uncovers a Cthulhu shrine before the building is demolished.

After the refinery raid, the U.S. military begins a combined land-and-sea assault on Innsmouth. The only part of the town that proves resistant to the attack is the headquarters of the Esoteric Order of Dagon, a cult that holds the whole town under its grip, devoted to two undersea demigods, Dagon and Mother Hydra, as well as the Great Old One Cthulhu. The building proves unbreachable by the Coast Guard and the Marines, but Jack finds a way in through an old smuggling entrance that is guarded by a star-spawn of Cthulhu. Inside, Jack saves Mackey, who had been kidnapped for a ritual sacrifice, and brings down the magical shield protecting the building. After discovering a secret chamber, he falls through the floor of a tunnel which leads into the sea.

Jack is rescued by the USS Urania, a Coast Guard vessel which is part of a group heading to Devil's Reef, following up on a lead provided by the FBI. On the way there, wizards on the reef summon powerful tidal waves to destroy the flotilla, but Jack kills them with the Urania's deck gun. The humanoid fish-men known as Deep Ones launch a mass attack on the Urania and eventually Dagon emerges, too. Despite almost the entirety of the ship's crew being wiped out by the attack, Jack manages to defeat the gigantic demigod, again with the deck gun, but the Urania sinks.

Jack finds himself on Devil's Reef, where he discovers old smuggling tunnels beneath the seabed, leading him to the underwater city of Y'ha-nthlei. The city is found to be located below Devil's Reef and is the home of the Deep Ones and members of the Order. U.S. Navy submarines attempt to torpedo Y'ha-nthlei, but are stopped by a magical barrier protecting the city. The Temple of Dagon is the source of the barrier, but the entrance is sealed off to prevent any interference. Jack finds another way in through ancient tunnels feared by the Deep Ones at the bottom of the city's foundations. Apparently, this passage, which leads to the temple, is an ancient prison for flying polyps, the enemy of the Great Race of Yith. Jack manages to defeat them with the help of a Yithian energy weapon. Jack enters the Temple of Dagon and kills Mother Hydra – whose song is generating the barrier – by deafening himself to her song, allowing him to take control of the Deep Ones. With the barrier down, the submarines attack the city, while Jack escapes through a portal leading back to the Order's headquarters and collapses in front of Hoover and Mackey.

Fragments of Jack's memory from his six years of amnesia return. A member of the Great Race of Yith explains that when he made contact with the Yith in the Boston manor, a Yithian swapped minds with him, leaving his body in control of a member of the Great Race of Yith, while his own mind was projected into the Yithian world. It is for this reason that Walters had a secondary personality when he was incarcerated in the Asylum and in the six years that followed – it was the mind of a Yithian in Jack's body. The same Yithian then explains that he swapped minds with Jack's father during the moment of Jack's conception, that Jack is only partially human as a result, and that he has two fathers: his human father and his Yithian father. In flesh, Jack is human, but he inherited Yithian psychic powers, which explains the cultists' interest in him, his ability to solve cases with clues retrieved from his dreams, his visions of coming danger and of the Yithian library-city of Pnakotus, and his ability to control Deep Ones in the Temple of Dagon. After six years living in Pnakotus in a Yithian body, a war with the Flying Polypous Creatures forces the Yith to send Jack's mind back to his own body. Simultaneously, they erase six years of his memory to protect his sanity, with the promise that "When the time is comes, you will remember... we will be waiting in the shadows of your dreams." His memories returned, Jack is confined in Arkham Asylum once more, where he attempts suicide by hanging himself, unable to handle the reality of himself and what he has witnessed. (Note: Although the game's story diverges in several places and features a completely different protagonist, several levels mirror passages from Lovecraft's novella The Shadow over Innsmouth. It also contains elements of the Call of Cthulhu tabletop role-playing game's campaign Escape from Innsmouth, such as the Marsh Refinery raid. A major sub-plot of the game is inspired by Lovecraft's novella The Shadow Out of Time. Within the in-game lore, its plot is supposed to be "based on the writings in Jack's journal, which were discovered in 1924.")

== Development ==
The game was in development by British independent studio Headfirst Productions for at least six years, and the development can be traced back to August 1999 and a discussion on the Usenet group alt.horror.cthulhu in which the Mythos fans contributed ideas for the game to Headfirst's Andrew Brazier. This and other feedback was later used to create the game, which Brazier termed "FPHAS – a First Person Horror Adventure Shooter". The game's protagonist Jack Walters has been repeatedly redesigned before his final look was created by Tim Appleton. Headfirst initially used the game engine NDL NetImmerse for rendering graphics combined with the Havok physics engine but later developed its own engine.

The first screenshots were shown in December 1999, and the game, originally planned for the PC and PlayStation 2, was scheduled for release in the third quarter of 2001. In 2000, Headfirst secured rights from Chaosium, publisher of Call of Cthulhu role-playing game. Before E3 2001 the game was stated to be "70 percent complete", but was then repeatedly delayed. In late 2002, the game's original publisher Ravensburger Interactive Media was taken over by JoWooD Productions, which had no interest in the title. The developers then signed a deal with Bethesda to release the game for the PC and Xbox, and the development of the PlayStation 2 version was aborted.

Headfirst Productions originally intended for a much larger, nonlinear role-playing-type storyline to be fitted within the game, including more characters and locations, as well as a cooperative gameplay system for up to four players. The latter would have enabled the players to pick one of four characters and either carry out their own investigation independently or team up with the others (in case of single-player gameplay, the other three investigators would be under AI control). A competitive multiplayer mode would have allowed for online deathmatch rounds in specifically designed levels. Several other ambitious features, such as a deeper sanity system and a high degree of environment interactivity, were also scrapped due to budget and time constraints and problems with the level design. The game was always supposed to use first-person view, but the screenshots from 2001 showed some third-person perspective stealth gameplay. Much of a promised "wide array of weapons" at the player's disposal was conceived but ultimately removed from the game, including a wooden club, a Mauser C96 automatic pistol, and a pump-action shotgun. Various weapon models and concept arts from the game were released by a former Headfirst artist Niel Venter via DeviantArt.

== Release ==
Call of Cthulhu: Dark Corners of the Earth was released on October 24, 2005, for the Xbox, and on March 27, 2006, for the PC. In the PC version, only the English and Russian versions of game have full dubbing (audio, subtitles, interface, main menu voices), while the Italian, French and German versions have only localized subtitles and interface. The game contains a number of software bugs, which have never been officially patched; these bugs are generally intermittent, and restoring from an earlier saved game can be enough to get past them. There is also an unofficial patch available that fixes some glitches and lowers the game's overall difficulty level. The Xbox version is officially compatible with the Xbox 360 in certain regions.

== Reception ==
Reception

Aggregate score
Aggregator	Score
Metacritic	XBOX: 77/100; PC: 76/100

Review scores
Publication	Score
GameSpot	7.9/10
GameSpy	3.5/5
GameZone	7.9/10
IGN	7.8/10
TeamXbox	8.1/10

In the United Kingdom, the Xbox version of Call of Cthulhu: Dark Corners of the Earth was a commercial bomb, with sales slightly above 5,000 units by the end of 2005. Eurogamer's Kristan Reed called it among "the most disappointing" commercial performances of an Xbox game that year, noting that it had been released "right in the thick of a busy release period to zero fanfare."

Call of Cthulhu: Dark Corners of the Earth received generally favorable reviews, but was also often criticized for being buggy and inaccessible for many players because of its high difficulty. GameSpy ranked it as the tenth-best game of E3 2004 while GameSpot nominated it for their "Most Surprisingly Good Game of 2005" award, with a comment that "after a development cycle that was nearing infinity, it's hard to imagine a world where this H.P. Lovecraft-based horror game turned out all right. Luckily for us, we don't have to imagine it." According to IGN, the game "succeeds brilliantly in some areas", making "great use of the source material" and forcing players "to accept some realistic responsibility for their character" due to the sanity system and HUD-less display, but can make the players "cringe at the difficult nature of the game." Greg Kasavin of GameSpot opined "a thick, unsettling atmosphere fills this ambitious first-person action-adventure, which makes up for some frustrating moments and dated graphics with plenty of chills, variety, and originality." Cheat Code Central's Cole Smith called it "one of the greatest book to game translations ever" and a game "that is full of twists, turns and incredibly wonderful scary surprises. It's got a great atmosphere which is sustained by dark and grainy graphics, chilling sound effects and an incredibly improbable storyline that is treated properly as to suspend reality from creeping in and ruining your experience." GameSpy's Allen Rausch wrote "this disturbing slice of Lovecraft's America is well worth the time to visit", as "despite the occasional missteps, Call of Cthulhu: Dark Corners of the Earth is a more than fitting tribute to its literary inspiration." Similarly, Kyle Williams of Gaming Target called it "a labor of love" that "defies convention in favor of creating a videogame experience that is a worthy heir to the Lovecraft name." TeamXbox's Matthew Fisher wrote that, despite some of the game's various shortcomings regarding the graphics and some of the detective aspects, "this is an immersive experience that is a new and unique title for the Xbox, which is more than a welcome change. Was it worth the wait? Absolutely." Despite the mostly positive reviews, the game was a commercial failure.

[Lovecraft's] work is all based on the idea that knowing a terrible truth is enough to terrify you so much to make you go mad. Knowledge of things beyond us are the true horror, the creatures and cults are merely the embodiment of that horror. That is what the game has managed to subtly capture.

— "Horror is Knowledge: The Presentation of Fear in Call of Cthulhu" by Eric Swain, PopMatters

The game was also acclaimed in several retrospective articles by various publications. The A.V. Club's Drew Toal called it "a weird and difficult game, in the best sense", while Davide Tomei from Adventure Classic Gaming described it as "a very unique game [that] brilliantly mixes in elements of action, adventure, and puzzle solving to offer up an exceptional survival horror experience." Marshall Lemon from The Escapist acclaimed it as an example of a horror game that features firearms-based combat while still being scary and opined "the end result plays like something Lovecraft would have created if he wrote games instead of books and lived beyond the 1930s." The game's townsfolk of Innsmouth placed ninth on GamesRadar's 2008 list of the gaming's "scariest villains ever" and 1UP.com featured it on their 2009 list of top five game worlds "where insanity is the entire point". In 2011, The Daily Telegraph listed it among the scariest games "you've never played" as second only to Amnesia: The Dark Descent, adding that this "flawed classic" was "too buggy, too tough, and criminally ignored upon release." TechRaptor's Kyle Lawrence recommended it as an "action game within a very well written Lovecraftian tale that uses the mythos to its fullest. Anyone who has an interest in Lovecraft should brave the horrendous difficulty and glitches of the game." PC Gamer UK put it at 87th place on their 2011 list of best PC games of all time for its frantic hotel escape sequence and "other great, scary set-pieces", calling it, "behind the bugs and clunkiness, a genuine and admirable attempt to make a horror-adventure that’s both fun to play and true to the spirit of Call of Cthulhu." That same year, GamePro ranked it as the 11th-best horror game of all time.

== Cancelled sequels ==
More Call of Cthulhu franchise games were announced by Headfirst Productions. Due to the very long development cycle of Dark Corners of the Earth, the other titles were being developed alongside it.

Destiny's End gameplay screenshot

- Call of Cthulhu: Destiny's End was a third-person perspective survival horror title for the PlayStation 2 and Xbox, which was originally announced in November 2002 as the PlayStation 2-exclusive Call of Cthulhu: Tainted Legacy, with a planned release in the fourth quarter of 2004. It was to be a direct sequel to Dark Corners of the Earth, set in the ruins of Innsmouth and in locations along the coast of New England in modern times, nearly 80 years after the events of the original game. It was to feature a cooperative multiplayer mode for two players, each controlling one of the two characters: the gun-wielding Jacob and the magic-using Emily (in its early version, Tainted Legacy, they were named Joshua and Madeline). Its gameplay was publicly presented during the E3 2005. A published trailer announced the release for Spring 2006. In June 2024 a playable PlayStation 2 demo was leaked.
- Call of Cthulhu: Beyond the Mountains of Madness was also announced in November 2002 and had been scheduled for the Xbox and PC release in the fourth quarter of 2004. It would have been a sequel to Lovecraft's novella At the Mountains of Madness, inspired by the Call of Cthulhu RPG campaign of the same title. The game was to be a survival horror and first-person shooter set in the 1930s and taking place in varied locations including Germany and Antarctica, and its protagonist would be a Miskatonic University archaeologist Robert Naples attempting to stop the Nazi occultist search for the ruins of the Elder Things' city.

Both games were cancelled when the company failed to find a new publisher for them in 2006, resulting in the bankruptcy and liquidation of Headfirst. UGO.com's Marissa Meli included Destiny's End on her 2011 list of 25 cancelled video games that "could have been some of the greatest games of all time" and Bloody Disgusting's Adam Dodd put both follow-up titles on their 2013 list of six cancelled horror video games "that could've been amazing".
