= The Hound =

1922 short story by H. P. Lovecraft

- Short story by H. P. Lovecraft
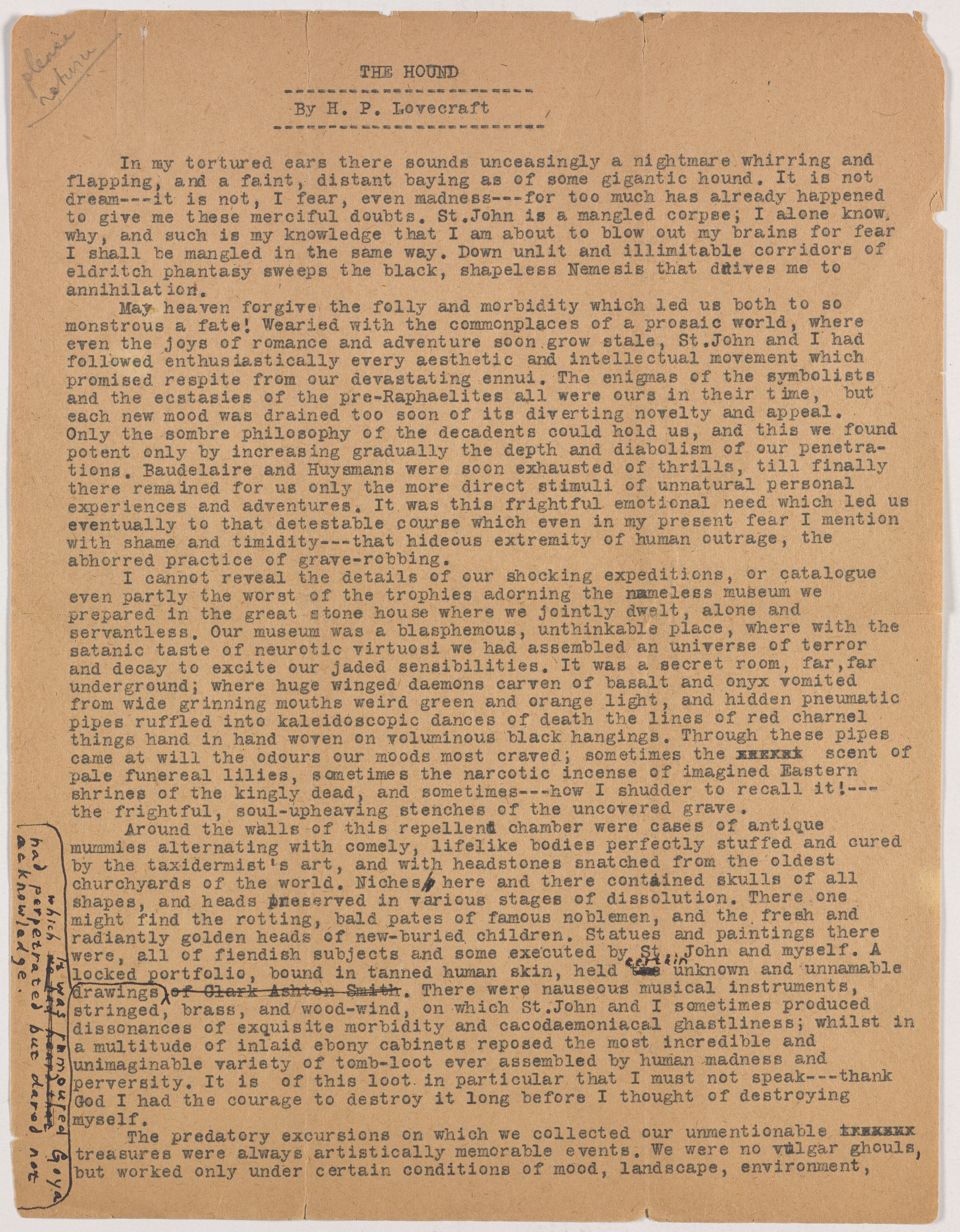
- First page of the manuscript The Hound.

Text available at Wikisource
- Country: United States
- Language: English
- Genre: Horror

Publication
- Published in: Weird Tales
- Publication type: Periodical
- Media type: Print (magazine)
- Publication date: February 1924

"The Hound" is a short story written by H. P. Lovecraft in September 1922 and published in the February 1924 issue of Weird Tales. It contains the first mention of Lovecraft's fictional text the Necronomicon.

== Plot ==
The story opens with the unnamed narrator preparing to commit suicide. Lamenting his fate, he reflects upon the events which led him to this moment.

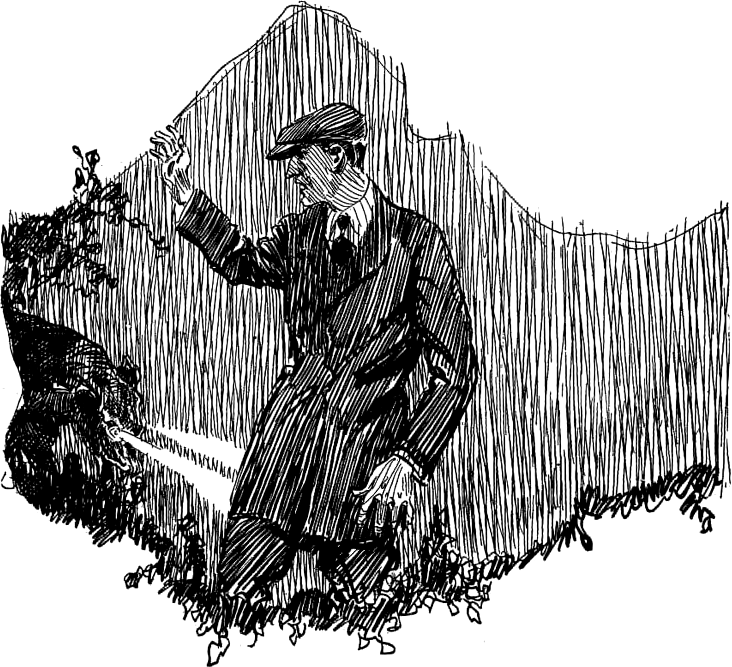
Illustration from Weird Tales (William Fred Heitman)

The narrator and his friend, St. John, are a pair of loners who both have a deranged interest in robbing graves. They constantly defile crypts and often keep souvenirs of their nocturnal expeditions. Since they reside in the same house, they have the opportunity to set up a sort of morbid museum in their basement. Using the objects collected from the various graves they have robbed, the two men organize a private exhibition. The collection consists of headstones, preserved bodies, skulls, and several heads in different phases of decomposition. It also includes statues, frightful paintings, and a locked portfolio bound in tanned human skin.

One day, the two learn of a particular grave, which sparks a profound interest in them: an old grave in a Holland cemetery which holds a legendary tomb raider within, one who is said to have stolen, many years ago, a "potent thing from a mighty sepulchre." They travel to the old cemetery where the man was buried. The thought of exhuming the final resting place of a former grave robber is irresistibly appealing to them. That, and the fact that the body had been buried several centuries before, drives them to travel such long distances to reach the site. Upon reaching the old cemetery, they notice the distant baying of a giant hound. They ignore it and begin their excavation. After some time, they hit a solid object in the ground. Clearing the last of the dirt from it, the two men unearth a strange and elaborately made casket. Upon opening the casket, they see that several places on the skeletal remains appear torn and shattered, as if attacked by a wild animal, yet the whole of the skeleton is still completely distinguishable. At that moment, they notice a jade amulet hanging from the skeleton's neck. They examine it and, after some observation, they recognize the amulet as one mentioned in "the forbidden Necronomicon of the mad Arab Abdul Alhazred." They immediately know they must have the amulet at all costs. They remove it from the skeleton and flee into the night. As they do, they notice once again the continuous sound of a baying hound in the distance.

After they return home to England, strange events begin to occur. Odd sounds can be heard within and around their house, including the distant howling they heard in the cemetery. One night, St. John is violently attacked and killed by a mysterious creature, which the narrator claims the amulet had brought unto him. He destroys the macabre museum he and his friend made before fleeing from the house and traveling to London. Still plagued by bizarre occurrences, he decides that he must return the amulet to its rightful owner. He travels to Holland, but the amulet is stolen from him before he can return it. The next day, he reads in the newspaper about a band of thieves savagely killed by an unknown creature. Slowly going insane, he returns to the churchyard and exhumes the coffin once more, only to find the skeleton within covered in caked blood and bits of flesh and hair, holding the lost amulet in its hand. Suddenly, the skeleton begins howling, the same howl that had tormented him since he first stole the amulet. The narrator flees the graveyard, succumbing to madness and despair. He states that he intends to kill himself with a revolver, believing death to be his only refuge from the crawling horror which grows within him.

== Cthulhu Mythos ==
"The Hound" contains several references to the body of lore known as the Cthulhu Mythos that Lovecraft shared with other horror writers. Most notably, it marks the first appearance of one of Lovecraft's most famous literary creations—the forbidden book known as the Necronomicon. Lovecraft had mentioned its author a year earlier, in "The Nameless City", but here for the first time named the book. Referring to an amulet found on a grave-robbing expedition, the narrator relates:

Alien it indeed was to all art and literature which sane and balanced readers know, but we recognized it as the thing hinted of in the forbidden Necronomicon of the mad Arab Abdul Alhazred; the ghastly soul-symbol of the corpse-eating cult of inaccessible Leng, in Central Asia. All too well did we trace the sinister lineaments described by the old Arab daemonologist; lineaments, he wrote, drawn from some obscure supernatural manifestation of the souls of those who vexed and gnawed at the dead.

The reference to "Leng" is one of the first mentions of Lovecraft's imaginary plateau, having only appeared before in "Celephais" (1920). Here placed in Central Asia, Leng is also associated in Lovecraft's writings with Antarctica and his imaginary Dreamlands.

Lovecraftian scholar Will Murray, pointing to the "semi-canine face" on the amulet as well as the "corpse-eating cult" of Leng, suggests that the titular creature of "The Hound" "probably represents an early form of the ghoul as Lovecraft would develop it."

== Inspiration ==
On September 16, 1922, Lovecraft toured the Flatbush Reformed Church in Brooklyn with his friend Rheinhart Kleiner, writing about the visit in a letter:

Around the old pile is a hoary churchyard, with internments [sic?] dating from around 1730 to the middle of the nineteenth century.... From one of the crumbling gravestones—dated 1747—I chipped a small piece to carry away. It lies before me as I write—and ought to suggest some sort of horror-story. I must place it beneath my pillow as I sleep... who can say what thing might not come out of the centuried earth to exact vengeance for his desecrated tomb? And should it come, who can say what it might not resemble?

Lovecraft wrote "The Hound" shortly afterwards, using as the name of one of the main characters his nickname for his companion Kleinhart, "St. John". The grave that is fatefully robbed in the story is in a "terrible Holland churchyard"—perhaps a reference to Flatbush church being part of the Dutch Reformed Church (although the story is actually set in the Netherlands, as well as in England).

Critic Steven J. Mariconda suggests that the story is a tribute to the Decadent literary movement in general and in particular Joris-Karl Huysmans' A rebours, an 1884 novel that Lovecraft greatly admired. (Huysmans is mentioned by name in the story, along with Baudelaire.) Like "The Hound"'s protagonists, victims of a "devastating ennui", the main character of A rebours suffers from an "overpowering tedium" that leads him to "imagine and then indulge in unnatural love-affairs and perverse pleasures." Mariconda also points to the heavy debt the story owes to Edgar Allan Poe, an influence acknowledged by several borrowed phrases:

The "oblong box" exumed, the mysterious "knock on my chamber door", and the "red death" brought by the Hound all echo Poe's phraseology.

== Reception ==
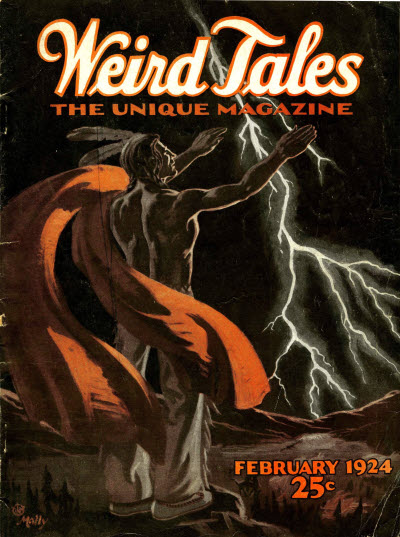
Cover of Weird Tales, February 1924 (first publication of The Hound)

Though Lovecraft chose "The Hound" as one of the five stories he initially submitted to Weird Tales, his main professional outlet, he later dismissed it as "a dead dog" and "a piece of junk".

Some critics have shared Lovecraft's deprecation; Lin Carter called it "a minor little tale" that is "slavishly Poe-esque in style". But the story has its defenders; Steven J. Mariconda says it is "written in a zestful, almost baroque style which is very entertaining", while Peter Cannon, saying that it must have been written "with tongue at least partly in cheek", credits it with a certain "naive charm".

The plot of the Poppy Z. Brite short story "His Mouth Will Taste of Wormwood" bears a strong resemblance to this Lovecraft story, albeit transplanted to a modern Southern Gothic Louisiana setting.

== Audio adaptations ==
- Roddy McDowall was the narrator of the story on a 1966 LP release (Lively Arts 30003) that also included the Lovecraft story "The Outsider".
- The story was produced as a 1930s-style radio drama on November 7, 2019 in episode 5 of the Tales from Beyond the Pale podcast.

== Sources ==
- Lovecraft, Howard P. (1999) [1920]. "The Hound". In S. T. Joshi; Peter Cannon (eds.). More Annotated Lovecraft (1st ed.). New York City, NY: Dell. ISBN 0-440-50875-4. With explanatory footnotes.
