= Mother Ann (rock formation) =

Rock formation in Massachusetts, United States

Coordinates: 42°34′48″N 70°39′51″W

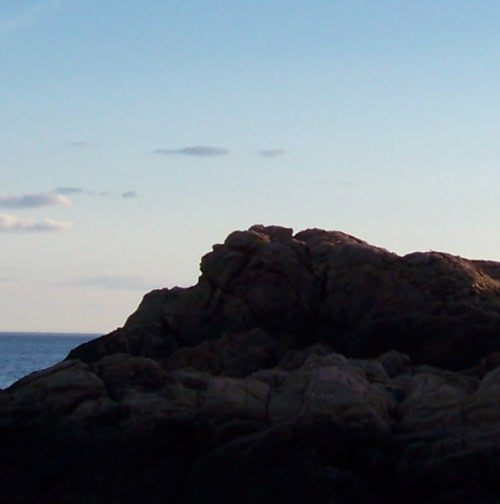
The Mother Ann rock formation

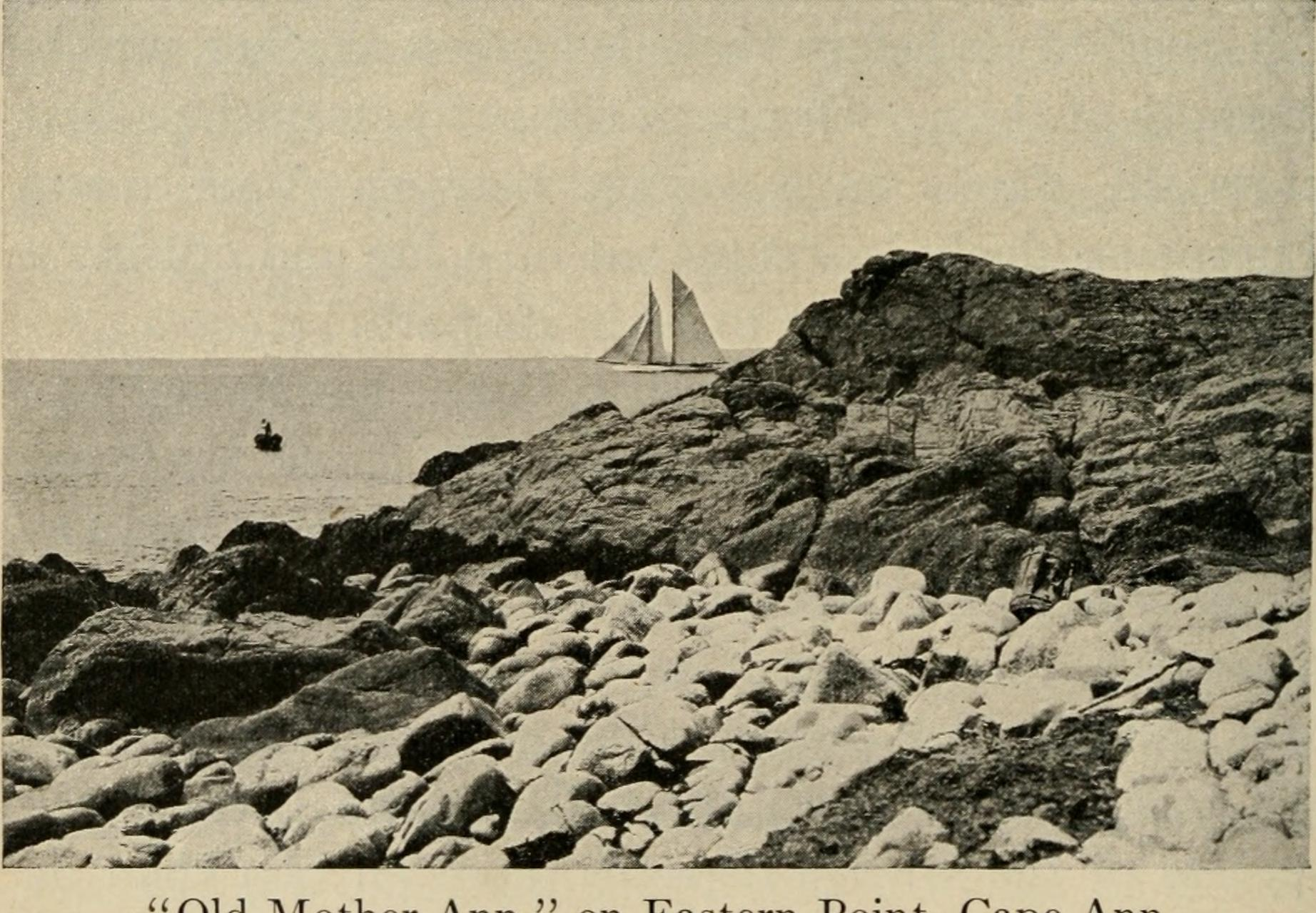
Old Mother Ann, on Eastern Point, Cape Ann, 1917

Mother Ann is a rock formation located near the Eastern Point Lighthouse in Gloucester, Massachusetts, United States. When viewed at the correct angle, the formation appears to be the silhouette of a reclining Puritan woman. It is also believed locally that the formation represents the royal mother of King Charles I, Anne of Denmark, after whom Cape Ann is named.

The formation may have been named by Captain William Thompson of Salem in 1891, and has since been compared to New Hampshire's Old Man in the Mountain. A nearby whistling buoy is known as "Mother Ann’s Cow".

The Mother Ann formation inspired several local writers, including Providence author H.P. Lovecraft and poet Clarence Manning Falt. Lovecraft may have used the Mother Ann formation as the basis for the setting of his short story "The Strange High House in the Mist" (1926).

== See also ==
- Old Man of the Mountain
- Old Man of Hoy
- List of rock formations that resemble human beings
