= Tryout (journal) =

Tryout was an amateur press journal published from 1914 to 1946 by Charles W. Smith of Haverhill, Massachusetts. It was connected to the National Amateur Press Association.

Smith (1852–1948) was a friend and correspondent of H. P. Lovecraft; Tryout was the first outlet for the H. P. Lovecraft short stories "The Cats of Ulthar" (November 1920), "The Terrible Old Man" (July 1921), "The Tree" (October 1921), and "In the Vault" (November 1925). Smith provided the plot idea for "In the Vault". Several later stories include details used from his visits to Haverhill to meet with Smith. Most notable of these is "The Shadow Out of Time", in which the protagonist is from Golden Hill in Haverhill (Smith's neighborhood) and is named Nathaniel Peaslee, a name on a headstone that Lovecraft noted in nearby Pentucket Cemetery.

Tryout also published non-fiction articles and numerous poems by Lovecraft. The publication was noted for its typographical errors, which Lovecraft referred to as "tryoutisms".
