= Eastern Point Light =

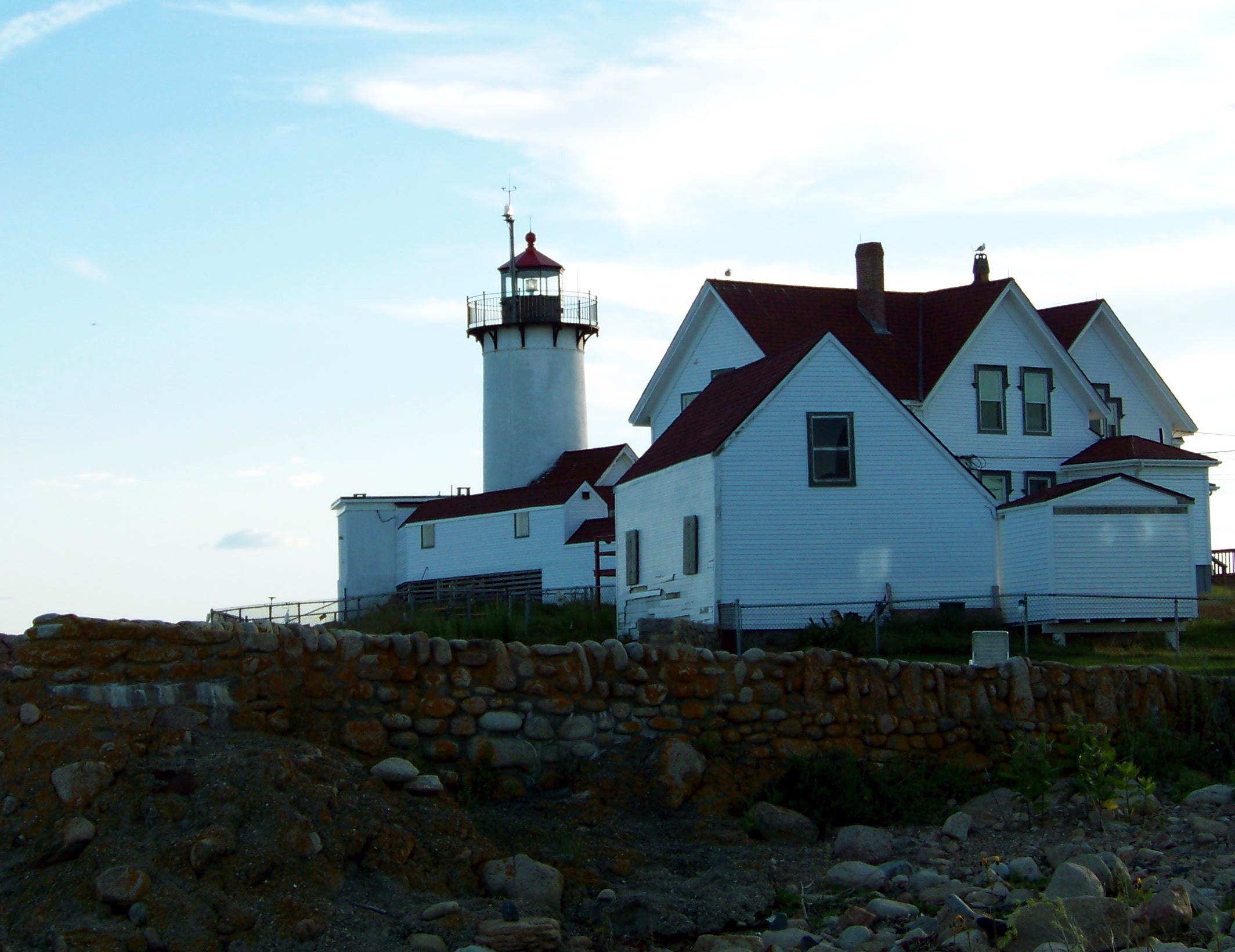
- Eastern Point Light Station
- Location: Gloucester, Massachusetts
- Coordinates: 42°34′48.6″N 70°39′52″W

Tower
- Constructed: 1833
- Foundation: Masonry
- Construction: Brick tower
- Automated: 1986
- Height: 36 feet (11 m)
- Shape: Conical
- Markings: White with black lantern and red roof
- Heritage: National Register of Historic Places listed place
- Fog signal: Horn, and original bell

Light
- First lit: 1890 (Current tower)
- Focal height: 57 feet (17 m)
- Lens: 4th order Fresnel lens (original), Optic DCB-24 (current)
- Range: 20 nmi (37 km; 23 mi)
- Characteristic: Flashing white every 5 sec.
- Eastern Point Light Station
- U.S. National Register of Historic Places
- U.S. Historic district
- Architectural style: Gothic, Queen Anne
- MPS: Lighthouses of Massachusetts TR
- NRHP reference No.: 87002027
- Added to NRHP: September 30, 1987

Eastern Point Light is a historic lighthouse on Cape Ann, in northeastern Massachusetts. It is known as the oldest seaport in America. The harbor has supported fishermen, whalers, and traders since 1616.

== History ==
The lighthouse was originally planned in 1829 and was erected by 1832 on the east side of the Gloucester Harbor entrance. It was first lit on January 1, 1832. The tower was rebuilt in 1848 and again in 1890. The third and current conical brick tower stands 36 feet (11 m) tall. The lighthouse has an attached two-story keeper's quarters, built in 1879. The actual light is 57 feet (17 m) above Mean High Water. Its white light is visible for 20 nautical miles (37 km; 23 mi).

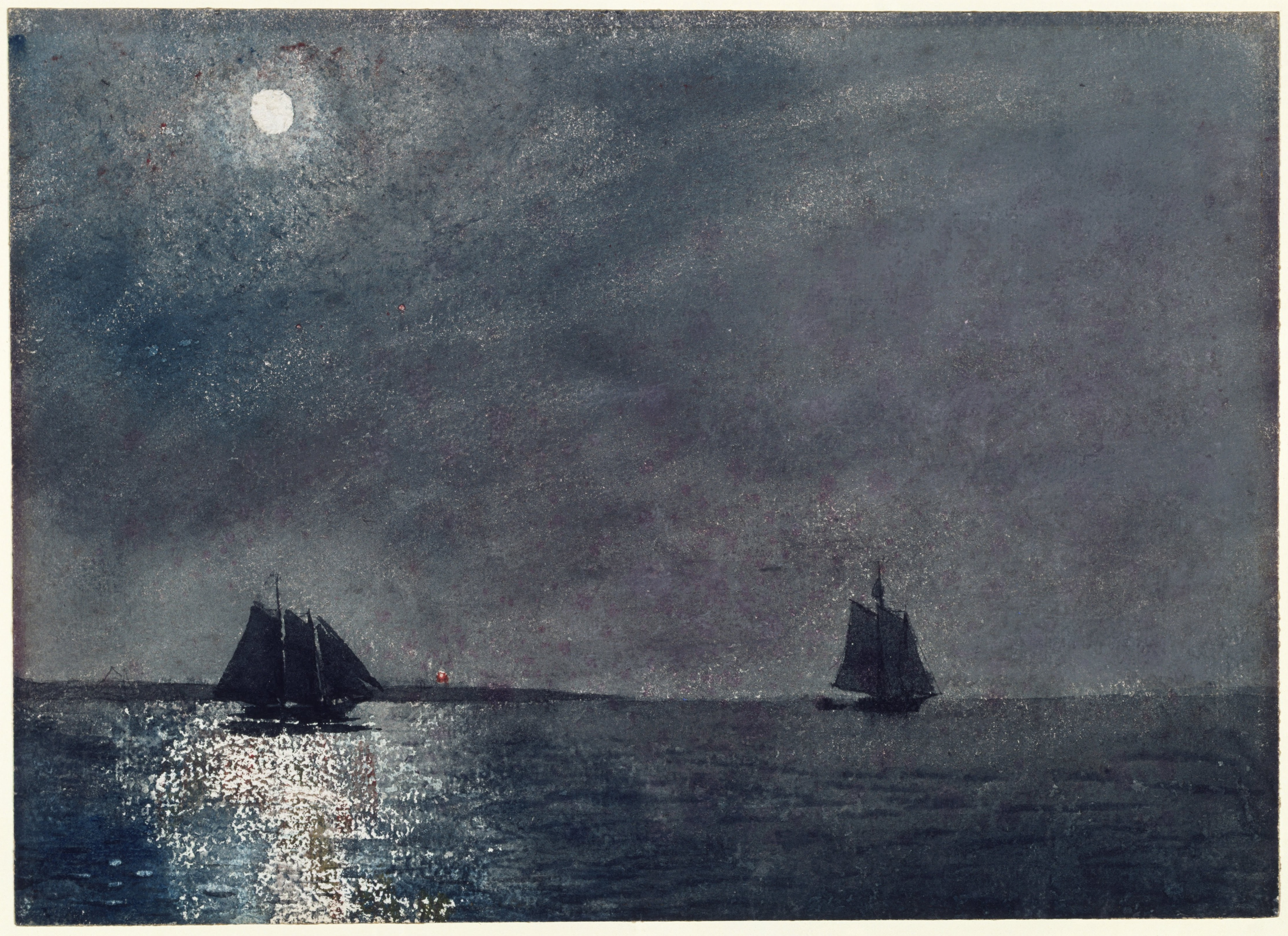
Winslow Homer, Eastern Point Light, 1880, Princeton University Art Museum

In 1880, the lighthouse was occupied by American landscape painter Winslow Homer. It was automated by September 1985 and was added to the National Register of Historic Places in 1987. The lighthouse is currently operated by the United States Coast Guard and is closed to the public.

A distinctive rock formation is known as Mother Ann is located along the shore near the lighthouse.

== See also ==
- National Register of Historic Places listings in Gloucester, Massachusetts
- National Register of Historic Places listings in Essex County, Massachusetts
