= The Tree (short story) =

1921 short story by H. P. Lovecraft

- Short story by H. P. Lovecraft

Text available at Wikisource
- Country: United States
- Language: English
- Genres: Horror, mystery

Publication
- Published in: Tryout (journal)
- Publication date: 1921

"The Tree" is a macabre short story by American horror fiction writer H. P. Lovecraft. It was written in 1920, and published in October 1921 in Tryout. Set in ancient Greece, the story concerns two sculptors who accept a commission with ironic consequences.

Lovecraft wrote "The Tree" early in his career. He was dismissive of the story in a 1936 letter. Such stories, he said, "if typed on good stock make excellent shelf-paper, but little else." The assessment of Lovecraft authority S. T. Joshi was that although the story "may be a trifle obvious... it is an effective display of Lovecraft's skill in handling a historical setting."

== Plot ==
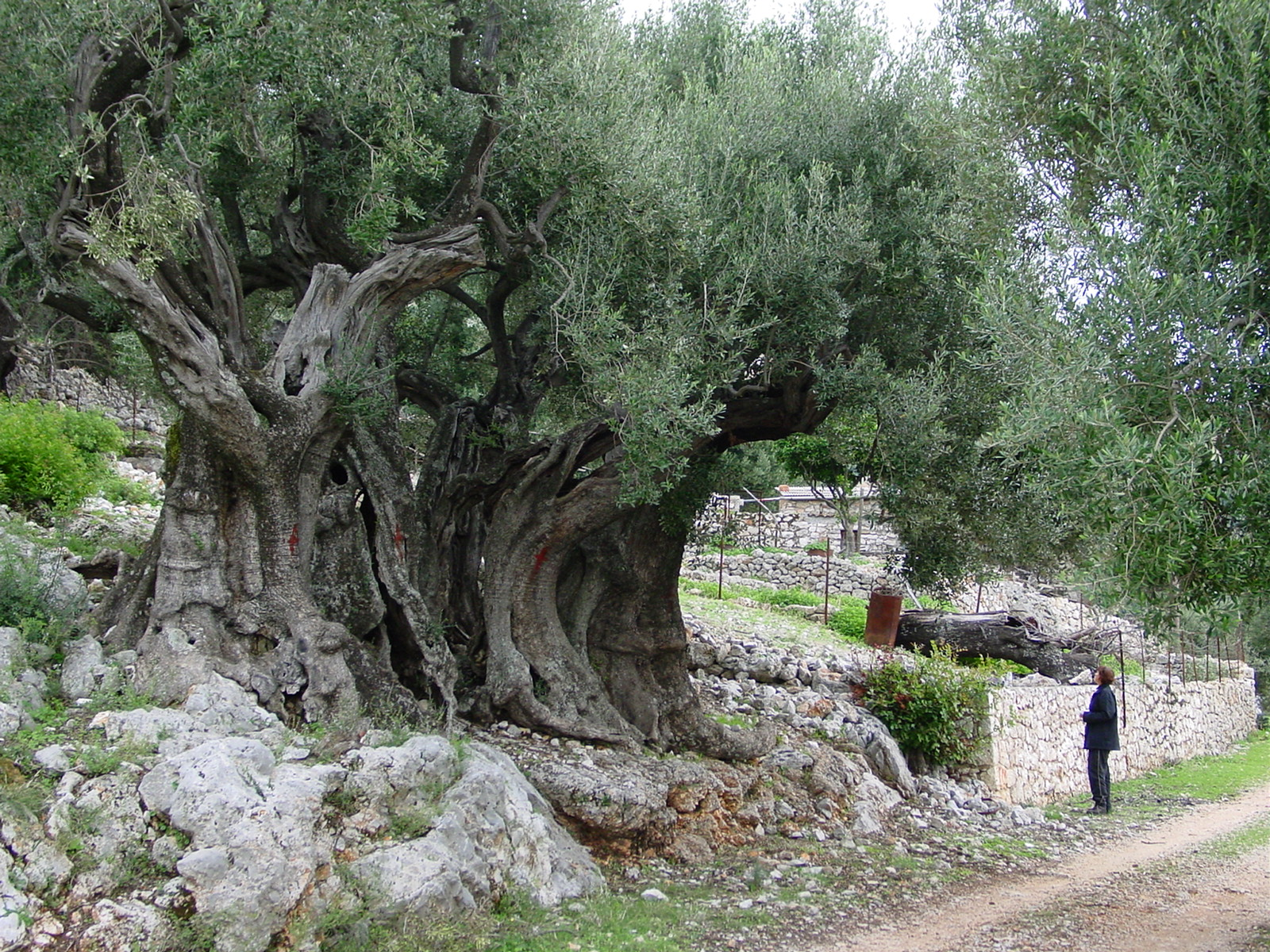
This olive tree on the Greek island of Ithaca is believed to be more than 1500 years old.

On a slope of Mount Maenalus in Arcadia is an olive grove that grows around a marble tomb and the ruin of an old villa. There, one gigantic tree resembles a frighteningly distorted man, and the roots of the tree have shifted the blocks of the tomb.

The narrator explains that the beekeeper who lives next door told him a story about the tree: Two renowned sculptors, Kalos and Musides, lived in the colonnaded villa, which was "resplendent" in its day. Both men created works that were widely known and celebrated. They were devoted friends, but different in disposition: Musides enjoyed the nightlife, while Kalos preferred the quiet of the olive grove. It was there he was said to receive his inspiration.

One day, emissaries from "the Tyrant of Syracuse" ask the sculptors each to create a statue of Tyché (Greek: τύχη, lit. 'fortune; fate'). The statue, they are told, must be "of great size and cunning workmanship", since it is to be "a wonder of nations and a goal of travellers." The most beautiful statue will be erected in the Tyrant's city, Syracuse. Kalos and Musides accept the commission. Secretly, the Tyrant expects the sculptors not only to compete but to cooperate, resulting in statuary that will be truly magnificent.

The work proceeds, and although Musides is still social and active, he seems morose—apparently because Kalos has fallen ill. Despite Kalos' weakened state, his visitors detect in him a serenity that contrasts Musides' dismay. Despite the efforts of his doctors and his friend Musides, Kalos weakens. When Kalos' death seems imminent, Musides weeps and promises to carve for him an elaborate marble sepulchre. Kalos asks that twigs from specific olive trees in the grove be buried near his head. Soon after, Kalos dies in the olive grove.

Musides builds the tomb and buries the olive twigs. From the burial place of the twigs an enormous olive tree grows at an incredible rate. An especially large branch hangs over the villa and Musides' statue.

Three years later, Musides' work on the statue is complete. The Tyrant's agents arrive, then head to town to stay the night. That evening, a windstorm whips down the mountain. When the Tyrant's people return to the villa the next morning, they find it utterly destroyed; the great tree branch has fallen, and Musides' statue has been crushed into unrecognizable pieces. Musides himself is nowhere to be found.

The ending of "The Tree" recalls the Latin epigraph with which Lovecraft opened the story; the quotation comes from book X of the Aeneid: "Fata viam invenient" ("The Fates will find a way").

== Inspiration ==
The epigraph that Lovecraft chose underscores his own use of a motif of classical Hellenic tragedy: the natural world (or the gods) witnessing and avenging wrongdoing. Examples can be found in the myth of Arion and the dolphins, and in the legend of Ibycus and the cranes.

Lovecraft intended the punishment in the story's denouement to confirm earlier indications of murder. Musides secretly poisons Kalos "when he sees his laurels in peril", yet he escapes social consequences because his countrymen perceive him to be a righteous man and a devoted friend, for his crime is hidden. By chanting "I know! I know!", the trees show us that "the things of Nature see behind human hypocrisy and perceive the baseness at the heart of outward virtue," explains Lovecraft.

== Sources ==
- Lovecraft, Howard P. (1986) [1921]. "The Tree". In S. T. Joshi (ed.). Dagon and Other Macabre Tales (9th corrected printing ed.). Sauk City, WI: Arkham House. ISBN 0-87054-039-4. Definitive version.
