= Arkham Unveiled =

Horror role-playing game supplement

Adventures and Background in the Home of Miskatonic University
- Cover art by Lee Gibbons
- Designers: Keith Herber; Mark Morrison; Richard Watts; L.N. Isynwill; John B. Monroe
- Publishers: Chaosium
- Publication: 1990; 35 years ago
- Genres: Horror
- Systems: Basic Role-Playing

Arkham Unveiled, subtitled "Adventures and Background in the Home of Miskatonic University", is a supplement published by Chaosium in 1990 for the horror role-playing game Call of Cthulhu, which itself is base on the works of H.P. Lovecraft.

== Contents ==
Arkham Unveiled describes the town of Arkham, Massachusetts as well as the town's center of higher learning, Miskatonic University, both often used by H.P. Lovecraft in his stories.

The book details Arkham block by block, and also covers its tram lines, climate, housing, employment, associations, justice, small details of daily life, the history of the city, a chronology covering the events of Lovecraft's stories and profiles of almost 200 non-player characters. Ten pages of the book are player handouts, but are not pull-out pages and must be photocopied in order to be used. The book also contains two pullout features, a map of Arkham, and a copy of the local tabloid newspaper.

Although the setting is given as the 1920s, the exact date is not specified. Some Lovecraft stories such as Herbert West–Reanimator have already occurred, and the horrible fate of its protagonist is the subject of whispered gossip. However, the events of The Dreams in the Witch-House and The Thing on the Doorstep have not yet occurred, meaning Walter Gilman is still alive, and Edward Pickman Derby and his wife Asenath Waite are still imprisoned in Crowninshield Manor. Other details taken from Lovecraft's stories are included such as the witch cult of Keziah Mason, ghouls in the cemetery, and the colour out of space still lurking in the bottom of a well.

Four scenarios are included:

- "A Little Knowledge", an introductory scenario for inexperienced Keepers set at Miskatonic University
- "The Hills Rise Wild", a short scenario set in the countryside that should take one play session to complete
- "The Dead of Night", another short scenario
- "The Heirs" is an investigation of one of the oldest families in the region and is longer, taking 2-4 play sessions to complete.

== Publication history ==
Chaosium first released the horror role-playing game Call of Cthulhu in 1981, and regularly refreshed it with new editions containing revamped rules. The fourth edition's release in 1989 sparked a line of superior products that game historian Stu Horvath called "the golden age for the line". One of these products was Arkham Unveiled, written by Keith Herber, Mark Morrison, and Richard Watts with L.N. Isynwill and John B. Monroe, with cover art by Lee Gibbons and interior illustrations by Tim Callender. It was published by Chaosium in 1990 as a 160-page softcover book with a removable large map and a removable tabloid newspaper.

Game historian Shannon Appelcline noted after Keith Herber worked on the fourth edition Call of Cthulhu role book, "Herber spearheaded a very successful set of Lovecraftian setting books beginning with Arkham Unveiled (1990). The series would run through Escape from Innsmouth (1992), though they have been reprinted many times since in many different forms."

== Reception ==
In Issue 26 of White Wolf (April/May, 1991), Wayne Ligon noted that a few things might be missing, but "it is the atmosphere this book seeks to invoke, and atmosphere is the essence of this game and this genre of roleplaying." Ligon concluded by giving this book a rating of 4 out of 5, saying "There are many more stories in Arkham, mentioned in passing throughout the text, with several 'bombs' just waiting for the right time to go off. The Keeper should have no trouble creating dozens of adventures from these notes."

In his 2023 book Monsters, Aliens, and Holes in the Ground, RPG historian Stu Horvath noted, "It's an ambitious book that details every noteworthy building, person, and lowdown within the city limits (and beyond), while also providing plenty of real estate in which GMs can fix their own particulars."

== Other recognition ==
A copy of Arkham Unveiled is held in the Edwin and Terry Murray Collection of Role-Playing Games at Duke University.

== Other reviews ==
- Casus Belli #65 (as Les Mysteres D'Arkham)
- Games Review (Volume 2, Issue 9 - Jun 1990)
- Graal #26
