= In the Vault =

Short story by H. P. Lovecraft

- Short story by H. P. Lovecraft
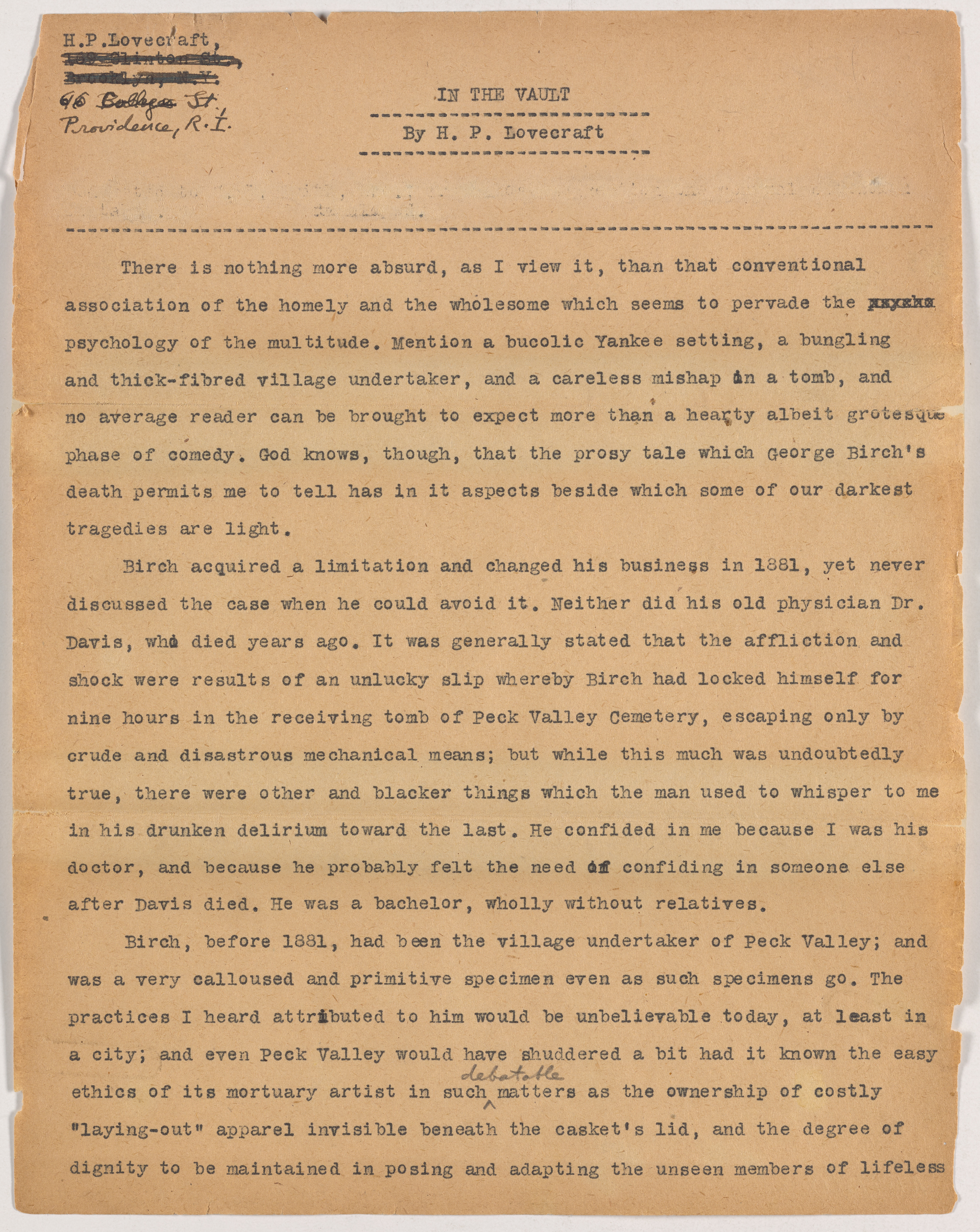

Text available at Wikisource
- Country: United States
- Language: English
- Genre: Horror short story

Publication
- Published in: Tryout
- Publication date: 1925

"In the Vault" is a short story by American horror fiction writer H. P. Lovecraft, written on September 18, 1925, and first published in the November 1925 issue of the amateur press journal Tryout.

== Plot ==
George Birch, an undertaker for the New England town of Peck Valley, finds himself trapped in the vault where coffins are stored during winter for burial in the spring. When Birch stacks the coffins to reach a transom window, his feet break through the lid of the top coffin, injuring his ankles and forcing him to crawl out of the vault.

Later, Dr. Davis investigates the vault, and finds that the top coffin was one of inferior workmanship, which Birch used as a repository for Asaph Sawyer, a vindictive citizen whom Birch had disliked, even though the coffin had originally been built for the much shorter Matthew Fenner. Davis finds that Birch had cut off Sawyer's feet in order to fit the body into the coffin, and the wounds on Birch's ankles are actually teeth marks.

== Inspiration ==
"In the Vault" was based on a suggestion made in August 1925 by Charles W. Smith, editor of the amateur journal Tryout, which Lovecraft recorded in a letter: "an undertaker imprisoned in a village vault where he was removing winter coffins for spring burial, & his escape by enlarging a transom reached by the piling up of the coffins". Lovecraft accordingly dedicated the story to Smith.

== Reaction ==
The story was rejected by Weird Tales in November 1925; according to Lovecraft, editor Farnsworth Wright feared that "its extreme gruesomeness would not pass the Indiana censorship", a reference to the controversy of C. M. Eddy, Jr.'s "The Loved Dead".

After being published in Tryout, the story was submitted in August 1926 to Ghost Stories, a "very crude" pulp magazine that specialized in "true" tales of the supernatural, which also rejected it. August Derleth urged Lovecraft to resubmit the story to Weird Tales in 1931, which finally published it in its April 1932 edition.

An H. P. Lovecraft Encyclopedia calls "In the Vault" "a commonplace tale of supernatural vengeance" in which "HPL attempts unsuccessfully to write in a more homespun, colloquial vein."
