= The Cats of Ulthar =

1920 short story by H. P. Lovecraft

- Short story by H. P. Lovecraft
- Cover of the 1977 Necronomicon Press edition

Text available at Wikisource
- Country: United States
- Language: English
- Genre: Fantasy short story

Publication
- Published in: Tryout
- Publication type: Literary journal
- Media type: Print
- Publication date: November 1920

"The Cats of Ulthar" is a short story written by American weird fiction author H. P. Lovecraft in June 1920. In the tale, an unnamed narrator relates the story of how a law forbidding the killing of cats came to be in a town called Ulthar. As the narrative goes, the city is home to an old couple who enjoy capturing and killing the townspeople's cats. When a caravan of wanderers passes through the city, the kitten of an orphan (Menes) traveling with the band disappears. Upon hearing of the couple's violent acts towards cats, Menes invokes a prayer before leaving town that causes the local felines to swarm the cat-killers' house and devour them. Upon witnessing the result, the local politicians pass a law forbidding the killing of cats.

Influenced by Lord Dunsany, the tale was a personal favorite of Lovecraft's and has remained popular since his death. Considered one of the best short stories of Lovecraft's early period, aspects of "The Cats of Ulthar" would be referenced again in the author's works The Other Gods and The Dream-Quest of Unknown Kadath. It was first published in the literary journal Tryout in November 1920 and is now in the public domain.

== Synopsis ==
An unnamed narrator, while gazing upon his pet cat, begins to reminisce about a law in the town of Ulthar which forbids the killing of cats and relates the story of how this law came to be. The tale begins with the introduction of an old cotter and his wife, who delight in trapping and violently killing any cats who venture onto their property. The people of the town are too afraid of the couple to speak against these acts, so they instead focus their efforts on keeping their felines from approaching the cotter's house. One night, a caravan of travelers from a distant land arrives and passes through the village. They bring with them an orphan named Menes who, having lost his family to a plague, has only a small, black kitten to keep him company. After being unable to find his kitten on the third day of his stay, Menes hears the stories of the old cotter and his wife, and decides to take action.

Menes spends time meditating prior to unleashing a prayer that affects the shapes and movements of the clouds in the sky, granting all the cats of Ulthar sentience. The caravan leaves Ulthar that night, shortly before the townspeople notice that all of their cats have gone missing. The townspeople suspect both the old couple and the wanderers, but the innkeeper's son Atal witnesses the felines circling the property of the cotter. The next morning, the cats have returned to their owners well-fed, but the cotter and his wife have vanished. When the townspeople explore their abandoned house, they discover nothing more than two skeletons that have been picked clean. The local burgesses, after reviewing the evidence and stories of the townspeople, decide to pass a law that forbids the killing of cats in Ulthar.

== Background ==
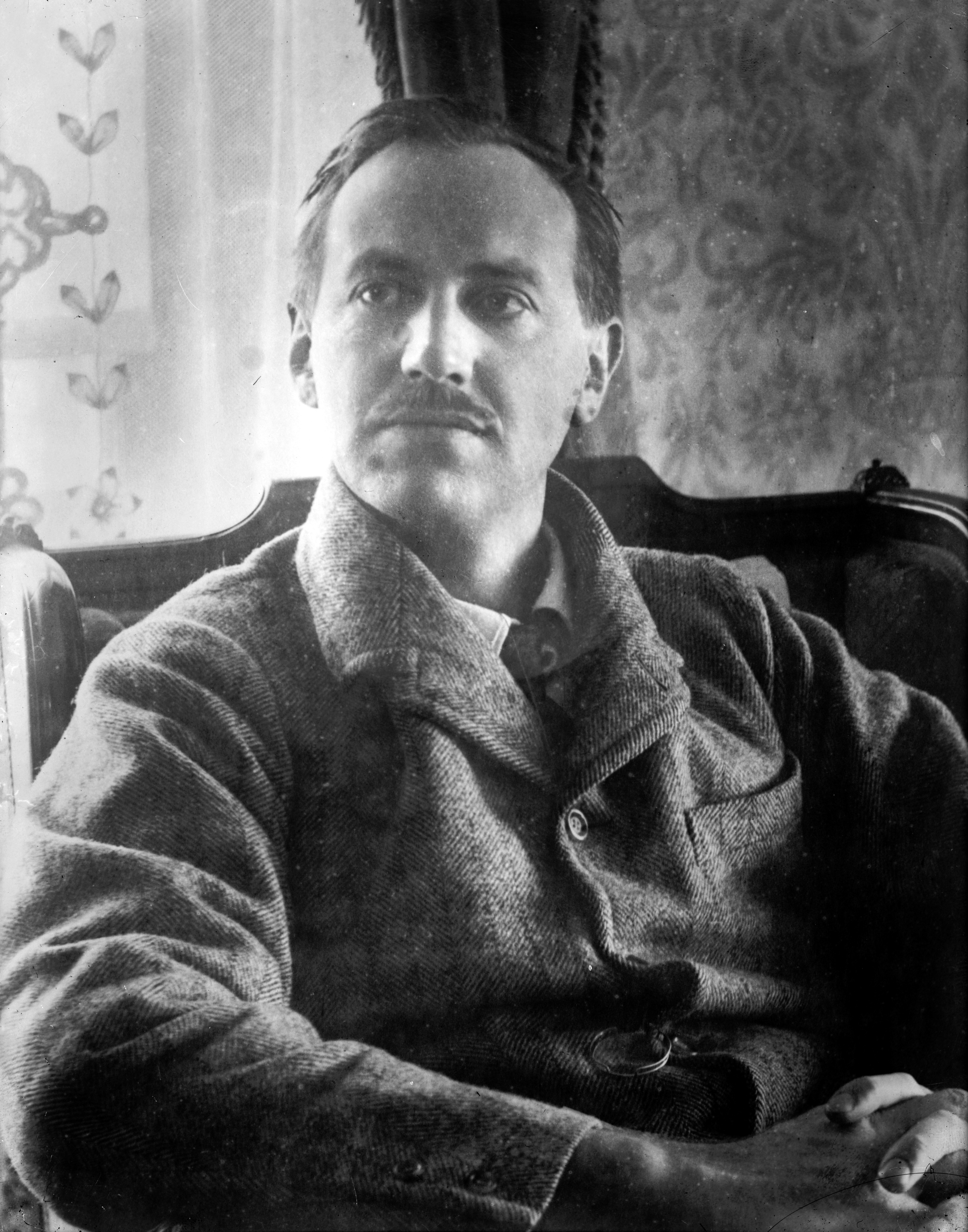
Edward Plunkett, Lord Dunsany, has been cited as a major influence on both this tale and other of Lovecraft's works

Lovecraft outlined the plot to his friend Rheinhart Kleiner in May 1920 and wrote "The Cats of Ulthar" on June 15, 1920, five months after completing his previous tale, The Terrible Old Man. Conceived during the author's early period, Lovecraft was influenced by the writing of Anglo-Irish writer Lord Dunsany and attempted to mimic his style. Among the literary aspects that Lovecraft borrows are the "vengeance motif" and the "ponderous tone" of Dunsany. Dunsany's influence is evident on the surface of the text as well: wanderers, similar to the ones portrayed in "The Cats of Ulthar", appear in Dunsany's earlier tale Idle Days on the Yann. Lovecraft's character of Menes shares his name with Menes, the semi-mythical founder of the ancient city of Memphis, Egypt. The ancient Egyptians were admirers of cats who made it a crime to kill or export felines.

Prior to "The Cats of Ulthar", Lovecraft had penned several tales in the style of Lord Dunsany, including The White Ship, The Street, The Doom that Came to Sarnath, The Terrible Old Man, and The Tree. His next Dunsanian tale, Celephaïs, was considered by Lovecraft scholar S. T. Joshi to be "one of his best and most significant". "The Cats of Ulthar" was first published in the literary journal Tryout in November 1920, and later appeared in Weird Tales in February 1926 and 1933, as well as being privately reprinted in a forty two-copy run in December 1935.

== Reception and legacy ==
"The Cats of Ulthar" was a personal favorite of Lovecraft's, who was an ardent cat lover. A number of contemporary critics, as well as Lovecraft himself, consider the story to be the best of all his Dunsanian tales. Other critics have noted that the story is one of Lovecraft's most famous tales that fits both the Dunsanian and the "weird fantasy" style. Literary critic Darrell Schweitzer, however, comments that "The Cats of Ulthar" resembles Dunsany in "mood and execution" only and that "[it] has no obvious parallels in any Dunsany story". Schweitzer refers to the prose as "restrained", and notes that, unlike Lovecraft, Dunsany preferred dogs and would have been unlikely to have written such an enthusiastic tribute. Lovecraft scholar S. T. Joshi disagrees, claiming that "[t]his tale owes more to Dunsany than many of his other 'Dunsanian' fantasies".

The character of Atal, the innkeeper's son who witnesses the cats of Ulthar circling the antagonists' cottage, would later appear in Lovecraft's The Other Gods. In this short story, written in August 1921 and first published in November 1933, Atal, now an adult, becomes an apprentice to Barzai the Wise and travels with him to seek out the tale's eponymous deities. Barzai even mentions the law against killing cats in Ulthar, further cementing the connection. Atal also appears as a priest in the long The Dream-Quest of Unknown Kadath — written in 1927 but not published until 1943 — when protagonist Randolph Carter visits the city 300 years after the events in "The Cats of Ulthar", when the town is still heavily populated by felines. Carter is later able to summon the cats of Ulthar to his aid. Cats would be used in what scholar Katharine M. Rogers calls "a more original way" in Lovecraft's 1923 work The Rats in the Walls. Here, as in others of Lovecraft's later tales, cats embody the attraction to horror while, unlike the human protagonists, "never pursuing horror to the point of becoming horrible themselves". The text of "The Cats of Ulthar", like many of Lovecraft's works, has fallen into the public domain and can be accessed in several compilations of the author's work as well as on the Internet.
