= Return to Dunwich =

Role-playing game supplement

Return to Dunwich is a 1991 role-playing supplement for Call of Cthulhu published by Chaosium.

== Contents ==
Return to Dunwich is a supplement in which the town of Dunwich is detailed.

== Reception ==
Wayne Ligon reviewed Return to Dunwich in White Wolf #30 (Feb., 1992), rating it a 4 out of 5 and stated that "I heartily recommend Return to Dunwich for any Call of Cthulhu Keeper."

== Reviews ==
- Saga (Issue 11 - Dec 1991)
- The Annotated Unspeakable Oath (Issue 3 - 1993)
- Casus Belli (Issue 71 - Sep 1992)
