= The Quest of Iranon =

1935 short story by H. P. Lovecraft

- Short story by H. P. Lovecraft
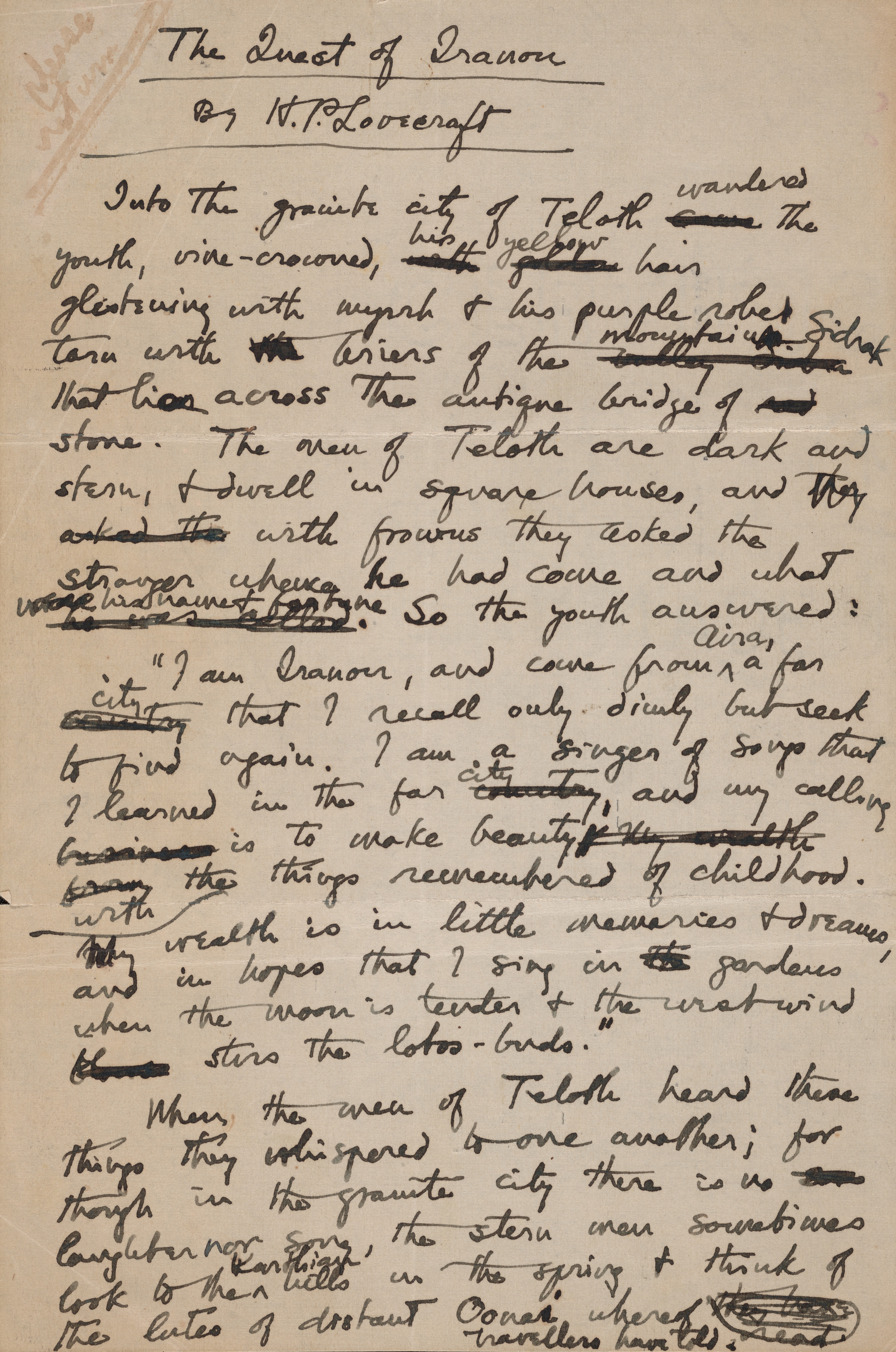
- The Quest of Iranon

Text available at Wikisource
- Country: United States
- Language: English
- Genre: Fantasy

Publication
- Published in: Galleon
- Publication date: July/August 1935

"The Quest of Iranon" is a fantasy short story by American writer H. P. Lovecraft. It was written on February 28, 1921, and was first published in the July/August 1935 issue of the magazine Galleon. It was later reprinted in Weird Tales in 1939.

== Plot ==
The story is about a golden-haired youth who wanders into the city of Teloth, telling tales of the great city of Aira, where he was a prince. While Iranon enjoys singing and telling his tales of wonder, few people appreciate it. A city solon even orders Iranon to cease his singing and music, and become apprenticed to a cobbler – or leave the city by sunset. When a disenfranchised boy named Romnod suggests leaving Teloth to go to the famed city of Oonai (which he thinks may be Aira, now under a different name), Iranon takes him up on his offer.

Iranon and Romnod spend years on their journey to Oonai. Along the way, Romnod grows up while Iranon remains exactly the same. Eventually they reach Oonai, which Iranon is disappointed (although not surprised) to discover isn't Aira. Iranon is loved by the people in Oonai, however, so he stays there even though he still desires to return to Aira. As the years pass, people appreciate him less and less, and he is eventually upstaged by dancers from the desert. By this point, Romnod has grown old and has become a drunkard. After Romnod's death, Iranon decides to leave Oonai and continue his search for Aira.

Eventually Iranon comes across an old shepherd and asks him if he knows of Aira. The shepherd tells him that he has indeed heard of it, for in his youth there was a beggar's boy who had always talked about it. The boy, who presumed himself to be a prince, was laughed at by everyone and ran away.

With the truth revealed, that Aira was merely a figment of his imagination, Iranon loses his eternal youth. Now aged significantly, Iranon wanders into the quicksands to his death.

== Connections ==
At one point Iranon says that he has "dwelt long in Olathoe in the land of Lomar", a reference to the setting of Lovecraft's short story "Polaris". This suggests that "The Quest of Iranon" takes place in the same world and era as "Polaris", that is, in a prehistoric Earth c. 24,000 BC. Iranon also declared "I...have gazed on the marsh where Sarnath once stood," a reference to "The Doom that Came to Sarnath".

== Adaptations ==
=== Stage ===
- In 2022, a musical adaptation titled "A Dream at the End of Time" was staged at the Hollywood Fringe Festival.

== Reception ==
An H. P. Lovecraft Encyclopedia calls "Iranon" "among the best of HPL's Dunsanian imitations."
