= The Terrible Old Man =

1921 horror short story by H. P. Lovecraft

- Short story by H. P. Lovecraft
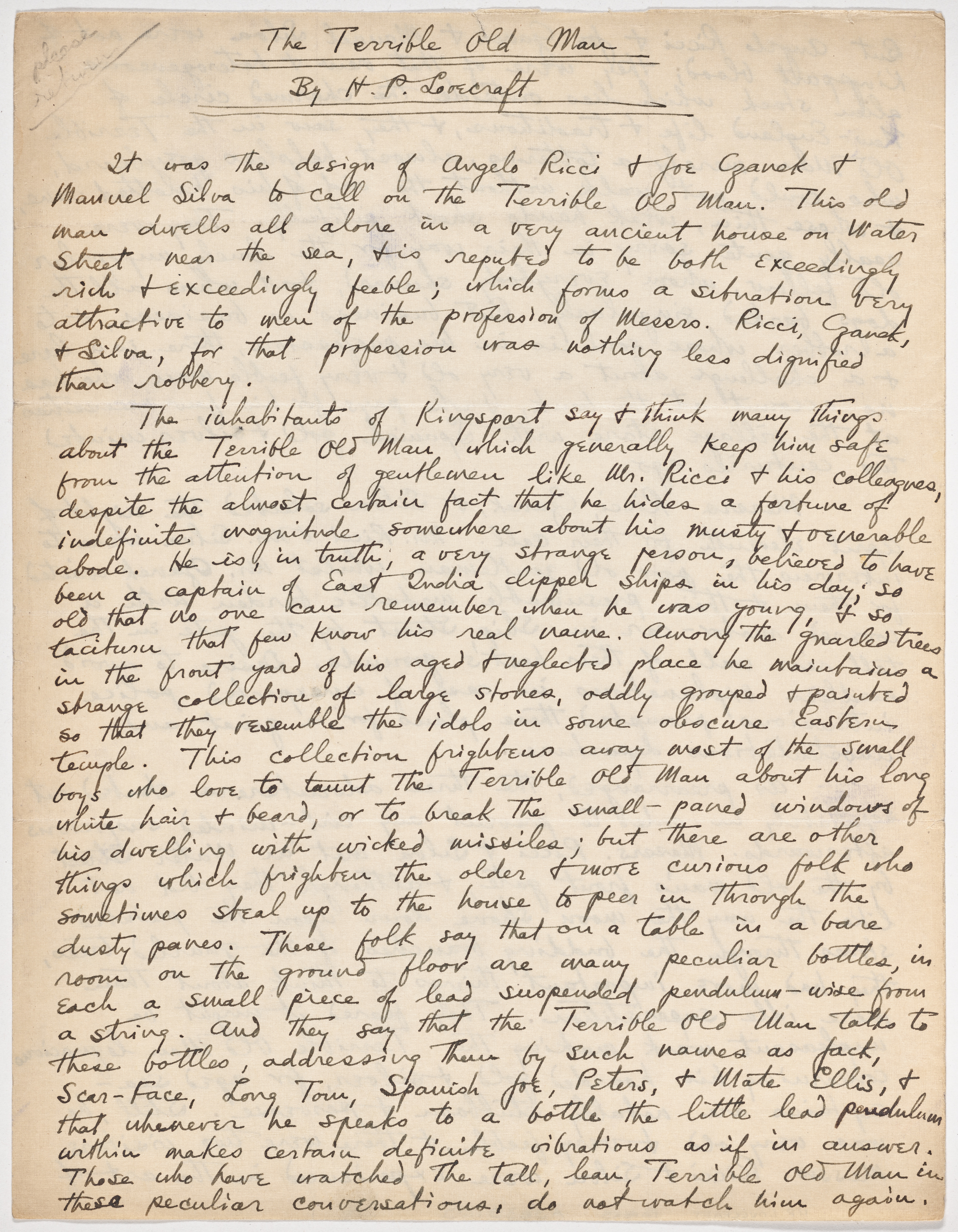
- The Terrible Old Man

Text available at Wikisource
- Country: United States
- Language: English
- Genre: Horror fiction

Publication
- Published in: Tryout
- Publication type: Amateur press journal
- Publisher: Charles W. Smith
- Media type: Paperback
- Publication date: July 1921

"The Terrible Old Man" is a short story of fewer than 1200 words by American writer H. P. Lovecraft. It was written on January 28, 1920, and first published in the Tryout, an amateur press publication, in July 1921. It is notable as the first story to make use of Lovecraft's imaginary New England setting, introducing the fictional town of Kingsport. The story, about the fate of three would-be robbers of the titular old man's house, has been criticized by Peter Cannon for being an openly xenophobic polemic against immigration.

== Plot ==
A strange old man, "so old that no one can remember when he was young, and so taciturn that few know his real name," lives alone in an ancient house on Water Street in the town of Kingsport. Even among the locals, few know the details of the old man's life, but it is believed that he in his youth captained East Indian clipper ships and accumulated great riches throughout his life. Those who had visited the property had seen bizarre collections of stones in the front yard and observed the old man carrying on conversations with mysterious bottles on his table, which make "certain definite vibrations as if in answer." Most locals take care to avoid the man and his house.

Angelo Ricci, Joe Czanek and Manuel Silva, three robbers, learn about the old man's supposed hoard of treasure and resolve to take it. Ricci and Silva go inside to "interview" the old man about the treasure, while Czanek waits outside in the getaway car. After waiting impatiently for a long time, Czanek is startled by an outburst of horrific screaming from the house but assumes that his colleagues have been too rough with the old man during their interrogation. However, the gate of the house opens, revealing the old man "smiling hideously" at him. For the first time, Czanek takes note of the man's unsettling yellow eyes.

The mutilated bodies of the three robbers are later found by the seaside, "horribly slashed as with many cutlasses, and horribly mangled as by the tread of many cruel boot-heels." The people of Kingsport talk about the discovery, as well as about the abandoned car and the screams heard in the night, but the old man shows no interest in their gossip.

== The Terrible Old Man character ==
The Terrible Old Man reappears in the story "The Strange High House in the Mist" in a more benevolent role. He further elaborates on the origin of the Strange High House, mentioning that the house was old when his own grandfather had been a boy. Given the Old Man's own implied longevity, the house must date to the very early days of colonial America.

He has a number of similarities with later characters created by Lovecraft, in particular Joseph Curwen, the villain of The Case of Charles Dexter Ward: both were improbably old, such that no one remembered when they were young; possessed vaguely defined but powerful abilities oriented around storing the dead in peculiar objects and calling them forth to serve them; and had access to ancient coinage of precious metals (as do the Whateleys in "The Dunwich Horror").

== Reception ==
Lovecraft scholar Peter Cannon describes the story as "little more than a polemic against the intrusion of people Lovecraft regarded as 'foreigners', that is, the non-English immigrants who arrived in the nineteenth century as cheap labor to fill the factories of an increasingly industrialized America." S. T. Joshi identified the story as having been inspired by Lord Dunsany's short story "Probable Adventure of the Three Literary Men". Joshi wrote that modern critics have "tried to deny the racism seemingly evident in the tale", but Lovecraft takes obvious satisfaction in killing off the criminal immigrants.

== Other media ==
The short story was adapted into a free point and click adventure game of the same name released for Windows and Android in 2015 by Cloak and Dagger Games. The game follows the plot of the short story, with players controlling Joe Czanek during the night of the attempted robbery, and features the ending text from the short story at its conclusion.

== Sources ==
- Lovecraft, Howard P. (1984) [1921]. "The Terrible Old Man". In S. T. Joshi (ed.). The Dunwich Horror and Others (9th corrected printing ed.). Sauk City, WI: Arkham House. ISBN 0-87054-037-8. Definitive version.
