= The Strange High House in the Mist =

1926 short story by H. P. Lovecraft

- Short story by H. P. Lovecraft
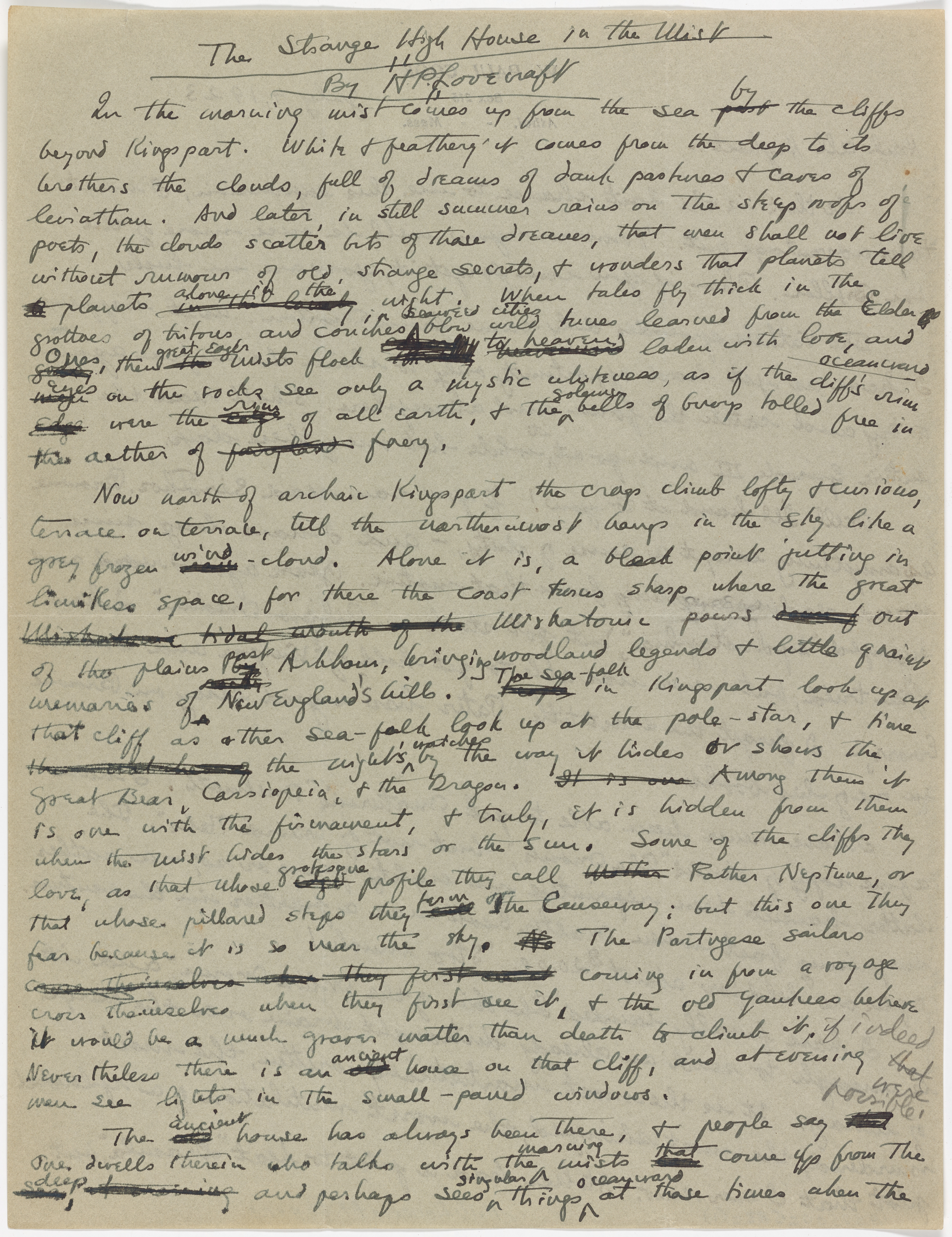
- The Strange High House in the Mist

Text available at Wikisource
- Country: United States
- Language: English
- Genre: Horror short story

Publication
- Published in: Weird Tales
- Publication date: October 1931

"The Strange High House in the Mist" is a short story by H. P. Lovecraft. Written on November 9, 1926, it was first published in the October 1931 issue of Weird Tales. It concerns a character traveling to the titular house which is perched on the top of a cliff which seems inaccessible both by land and sea, yet is apparently inhabited.

== Plot ==
Thomas Olney, a "philosopher" visiting the town of Kingsport, Massachusetts with his family, is intrigued by a strange house on a cliff overlooking the ocean. It is unaccountably high and old and the locals have a generations-long dread of the place which no one is known to have visited. With great difficulty, Olney climbs the crag, approaches the house, and meets the mysterious man who lives there. The only door opens directly onto a sheer cliff, giving access only to mist and "the abyss". The transmittal of archaic lore and a life-altering encounter with the supernatural ensue, as Olney is not the only visitor that day. He returns to Kingsport the next day, but seems to have left his spirit behind in the strange, remote dwelling.

== Inspiration ==
An H. P. Lovecraft Encyclopedia suggests that the story may have been inspired by Lord Dunsany's Chronicles of Rodriguez, in which strange sights can be seen from a wizard's house on a crag. One model for the setting was Mother Ann, a headland near Gloucester, Massachusetts.

== Connections ==
Kingsport, which is mentioned in several Lovecraft stories, first appeared in "The Terrible Old Man" (1920). The title character of that story makes an appearance in "The Strange High House in the Mist" as well, as the Old Man mentions that the House had been on the cliff even when his grandfather was a boy, which the main character comments "must be immeasurable ages ago".

The story makes reference to the Celtic god Nodens, who also appears in The Dream-Quest of Unknown Kadath. This entity was later incorporated into the Cthulhu Mythos by August Derleth as the leader of the Elder Gods. In the same passage in "The Strange High House", Lovecraft also mentions the arrival of the god Neptune, but that Roman deity has not similarly been adopted by Lovecraftian writers.

The man in the House mentions Atlantis, which was also mentioned in "The Temple" as the possible identity of the mysterious underwater city. He also mentions Hatheg-Kla and Ulthar from "The Other Gods" and "The Cats of Ulthar".

== Reception ==
The story was originally rejected by Weird Tales when submitted in July 1927. In 1929, Lovecraft agreed to let W. Paul Cook publish it in the second issue of The Recluse, but when it became clear that that issue would never appear, he resubmitted it to Weird Tales, which accepted it, paying him $55. Robert A. W. Lowndes called "The Strange High House in the Mist" one of Lovecraft's "best short stories".
