= Escape from Innsmouth =

- Publisher: Chaosium
- Publication date: 1992

Escape from Innsmouth is a 1992 role-playing game supplement published by Chaosium for Call of Cthulhu. Large parts of this scenario would also be adapted for Call of Cthulhu: Dark Corners of the Earth by Headfirst Productions in 2005.

== Contents ==
Escape from Innsmouth is a supplement which describes the town of Innsmouth.

== Publication history ==
Shannon Appelcline detailed how after the publication of the fourth edition of Call of Cthulhu, "[Keith] Herber spearheaded a very successful set of Lovecraftian setting books beginning with Arkham Unveiled (1990). The series, which detailed the locales of 'Lovecraft Country,' would run through Escape from Innsmouth (1992) — though they've been reprinted many times since in many different forms."

== Reviews ==
- InQuest Gamer #34
- Backstab #8
- Roleplayer Independent (Volume 1, Issue 6 - May 1993)
- Wunderwelten (Issue 16 - Apr 1993)
- Casus Belli #75
