= Celephaïs =

1922 short story by H. P. Lovecraft

- Short story by H. P. Lovecraft
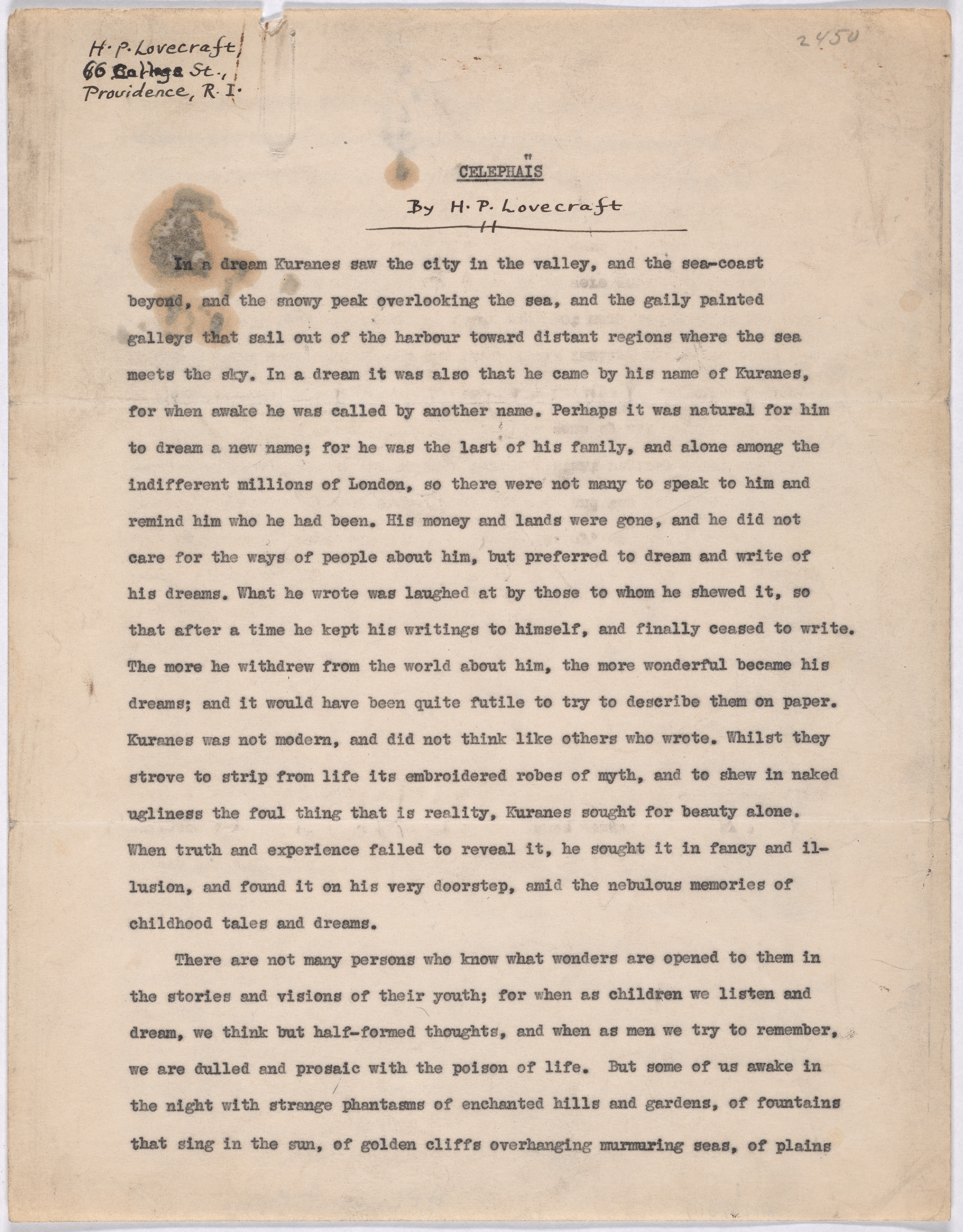
- First page of the manuscript Celephaïs

Text available at Wikisource
- Country: United States
- Language: English

Publication
- Published in: Rainbow
- Publication type: Periodical
- Media type: Print (magazine)
- Publication date: May 1922

"Celephaïs" (/ˈsɛləfeɪs/) is a fantasy story by American horror fiction writer H. P. Lovecraft, written in early November 1920 and first published in the May 1922 issue of the Rainbow. It is part of the body of work which later came to be known as Lovecraft's Dream Cycle. The title refers to a fictional city that later appears in other Dream Cycle stories, including Lovecraft's novella The Dream-Quest of Unknown Kadath (1926).

== Plot ==
Celephaïs was created in a dream by Kuranes (which is his name in dreams—his real name is not given) as a child, of the English landed gentry. Then as a man in his forties, alone and dispossessed in contemporary London, he dreams it again and, seeking it, slowly slips away to the dream-world. Finally knights guide him through medieval England to his ancestral estate, where he spent his boyhood, and then to Celephaïs. He became the king and chief god of the city, though his body washes up by his ancestors' tower, now owned by a parvenu.

In The Dream-Quest of Unknown Kadath, Randolph Carter pays a visit to Kuranes, finding that the great dreamer has grown so homesick for his native Cornwall, he has dreamed parts of Celephaïs to resemble the land of his boyhood. Kuranes advises Carter, on a mission to find his own dream-city, to be careful what he wishes for—he might get it.

== Inspiration ==
Like many of Lovecraft's stories, "Celephaïs" was inspired by a dream, recorded in his commonplace book as "Dream of flying over city."

The story resembles a tale by Lord Dunsany, The Coronation of Mr. Thomas Shap in The Book of Wonder, in which the title character becomes more and more engrossed in his imaginary kingdom of Larkar until he begins to neglect business and routine tasks of daily living, and ultimately is placed in a madhouse. The imagery of the horses drifting off the cliff may derive from Ambrose Bierce's A Horseman in the Sky (1891).

The fictional village of Innsmouth in New England is said to be based on the fishing town of Fleetwood, Lancashire which bears an uncanny resemblance to the description of the village in the later Shadow Over Innsmouth and its inhabitants.

== The city ==
In the original short story, Celephaïs is described as being situated in the valley of Ooth-Nargai beside the Cerenerian Sea. Its most remarkable feature is that it is unaffected by the passage of time, and takes no decay or wear, so that a person may leave it and return many years later to find that nothing has changed.

Important landmarks in Celephaïs are the turquoise temple of Nath-Horthath and the Street of Pillars. Nearby rises snow-capped Mount Aran, whose lower slopes are replete with ginkgo trees. Galleys from the port of Celephaïs go everywhere in the Dreamlands, but especially to the cloud-kingdom Serannian, reaching its harbor by sailing into the sky where the Cerenerian Sea meets the horizon.

== Sources ==
- Joshi, S. T.; David E. Schultz (2001). An H. P. Lovecraft Encyclopedia. Westport, CT: Greenwood Press. ISBN 0-313-31578-7.
- Lovecraft, Howard P.
  - [1934] S. T. Joshi, ed. (1987). "Celephaïs". Dagon and Other Macabre Tales (9th corrected printing ed.). Sauk City, WI: Arkham House. ISBN 0-87054-039-4. Definitive version.
  - [1926] S. T. Joshi, ed. (1985). "The Dream-Quest of Unknown Kadath". At the Mountains of Madness, and Other Novels (7th corrected printing ed.). Sauk City, WI: Arkham House. ISBN 0-87054-038-6. Definitive version.
