= H. P. Lovecraft bibliography =

American literary canon

This is a complete list of works by H. P. Lovecraft. Dates for the fiction, collaborations and juvenilia are in the format: composition date / first publication date, taken from An H. P. Lovecraft Encyclopedia by S. T. Joshi and D. E. Schultz, Hippocampus Press, New York, 2001. For other sections, dates are the time of composition, not publication. Many of these works can be found on Wikisource.

== Fiction ==
Sl. No.	Title	Date written	Date published	Form
1	"The Alchemist"	1908	Nov 1916	Short story
2	"The Tomb"	Jun 1917	Mar 1922	Short story
3	"Dagon"	Jul 1917	Nov 1919	Short story
4	"A Reminiscence of Dr. Samuel Johnson"	Sum-early Fall 1917	Sep 1917	Short story
5	"Polaris"	Spr-Sum 1918	Dec 1920	Short story
6	"Beyond the Wall of Sleep"	Spr 1919	Oct 1919	Short story
7	"Memory"	Spr 1919	May 1923	Flash fiction
8	"Old Bugs"	c.Jul 1919	1959	Short story
9	"The Transition of Juan Romero"	16 September 1919	1944	Short story
10	"The White Ship"	c.Oct 1919	Nov 1919	Short story
11	"The Doom that Came to Sarnath"	3 December 1919	Jun 1920	Short story
12	"The Statement of Randolph Carter"	Dec 1919	May 1920	Short story
13	"The Street"	late 1919	Dec 1920	Short story
14	"The Terrible Old Man"	28 January 1920	Jul 1921	Short story
15	"The Cats of Ulthar"	15 June 1920	Nov 1920	Short story
16	"The Tree"	Jan-Jun 1920	Oct 1921	Short story
17	"Celephaïs"	early Nov 1920	May 1922	Short story
18	"From Beyond"	16 November 1920	Jun 1934	Short story
19	"The Temple"	c. Jun-Nov 1920	Sep 1925	Short story
20	"Nyarlathotep"	c.Nov 1920	Nov 1920	Short story
21	"The Picture in the House"	12 December 1920	Sum 1921	Short story
22	"Facts Concerning the Late Arthur Jermyn and His Family"	Fall 1920	Mar & Jun 1921 as "The White Ape"	Short story
23	"The Nameless City"	Jan 1921	Nov 1921	Short story
24	"The Quest of Iranon"	28 February 1921	Jul-Aug 1935	Short story
25	"The Moon-Bog"	March 10, 1921	Jun 1926	Short story
26	"Ex Oblivione"	1920 – Mar 1921 (unclear)	Mar 1921	Short story
27	"The Other Gods"	14 August 1921	Nov 1933	Short story
28	"The Outsider"	Spr-Sum 1921	Apr 1926	Short story
29	"The Music of Erich Zann"	Dec 1921	Mar 1922	Short story
30	"Sweet Ermengarde"	c. 1919–21?	1943	Short story
31	"Hypnos"	Mar 1922	May 1923	Short story
32	"What the Moon Brings"	5 June 1922	May 1923	Short story
33	"Azathoth"	Fragment Jun 1922	Jun 1938	Fragment
34	"Herbert West–Reanimator"	Oct 1921 – Jun 1922	Feb-Jul 1922	Short story
35	"The Hound"	Oct 1922	Feb 1924	Short story
36	"The Lurking Fear"	Nov 1922	Jan-Apr 1923	Short story
37	"The Rats in the Walls"	Aug-Sep 1923	Mar 1924	Short story
38	"The Unnamable"	Sep 1923	Jul 1925	Short story
39	"The Festival"	Oct 1923	Jan 1925	Short story
40	"The Shunned House"	Oct 1924	Oct 1937	Short story
41	"The Horror at Red Hook"	1-2 Aug 1925	Jan 1927	Short story
42	"He"	11 August 1925	Sep 1926	Short story
43	"In the Vault"	18 September 1925	Nov 1925	Short story
44	"Cool Air"	Feb 1926	Mar 1928	Short story
45	"The Call of Cthulhu"	Aug-Sep 1926	Feb 1928	Short story
46	"Pickman's Model"	Sep 1926	Oct 1927	Short story
47	"The Strange High House in the Mist"	9 November 1926	Oct 1931	Short story
48	"The Silver Key"	Nov 1926	Jan 1929	Short story
49	The Dream-Quest of Unknown Kadath	Oct 1926-22 Jan 1927	1943	Novella
50	The Case of Charles Dexter Ward	Jan-Mar 1, 1927	May & Jul 1941	Novel
51	"The Colour Out of Space"	Mar 1927	Sep 1927	Short story
52	"The Descendant"	Fragment early 1927	1938	Fragment
53	"The Very Old Folk"	3 November 1927	Sum 1940	Letter excerpt
54	"History of the Necronomicon"	sketch Fall 1927	1938	Brief pseudo-history
55	The Dunwich Horror	Aug 1928	Apr 1929	Novella
56	"Ibid"	Sum 1928	Jan 1938	Short story
57	The Whisperer in Darkness	24 Feb-Sep 26, 1930	Aug 1931	Novella
58	At the Mountains of Madness	24 Feb-Mar 22, 1931	Feb-Apr 1936	Novella
59	The Shadow over Innsmouth	Nov-Dec 1931	Apr 1936	Novella
60	"The Dreams in the Witch House"	Feb 1932	Jul 1933	Short story
61	"The Thing on the Doorstep"	21-24 Aug 1933	Jan 1937	Short story
62	"The Book"	Fragment c. Oct 1933	1938	Fragment
63	"The Evil Clergyman"	Letter extract Fall 1933	Apr 1939	Letter excerpt
64	The Shadow Out of Time	10 Nov 1934- February 22, 1935	Jun 1936	Novella
65	"The Haunter of the Dark"	5-9 Nov 1935	Dec 1936	Short story

== Collaborations, revisions, and ghost writing ==
Title	Date written	Date published	Collaborators (or Revision Client)
The Battle that Ended the Century	Jun 1934	Jun 1934	R. H. Barlow
Bothon	1930	1946	Henry S. Whitehead
The Challenge from Beyond	Aug 1935	Sep 1935	C.L. Moore, A. Merritt, Robert E. Howard and Frank Belknap Long
Collapsing Cosmoses	Jun 1935	1938	R. H. Barlow
The Crawling Chaos	c. Dec 1920	Apr 1921	Winifred V. Jackson
The Curse of Yig	Spring 1928	Nov 1929	Zealia Bishop
The Diary of Alonzo Typer	Oct 1935	Feb 1938	William Lumley
The Disinterment	Sep 1935	Jan 1937	Duane W. Rimel
The Electric Executioner	Jul 1929	Aug 1930	Adolphe de Castro (revised from “The Automatic Executioner” by Castro, first published 1891 November 14)
The Green Meadow	c. 1918–1919	Spring 1927	Winifred V. Jackson
Four O'Clock	1922	1949	Sonia Greene
The Hoard of the Wizard-Beast	1933	1933	R. H. Barlow
The Horror at Martin's Beach	Jun 1922	Nov 1923	Sonia Greene
The Horror in the Burying-Ground	c. 1933–1934	May 1937	Hazel Heald
The Horror in the Museum	Oct 1932	Jul 1933	Hazel Heald
Imprisoned with the Pharaohs or Under the Pyramids	Feb 1924	May 1924	Harry Houdini
The Last Test	c. Oct-Nov 1927	Nov 1928	Adolphe de Castro
The Man of Stone	Summer 1932	Oct 1932	Hazel Heald
Medusa's Coil	c. May-Aug 1930	Jan 1939	Zealia Bishop
The Mound	c. Dec 1929 – Jan 1930	Nov 1940	Zealia Bishop
The Night Ocean	Summer 1936	Winter 1939	R. H. Barlow
Out of the Aeons	c. Aug 1933	Apr 1935	Hazel Heald
Poetry and the Gods	c. Summer 1920	Sep 1920	Anna Helen Crofts
The Slaying of the Monster	1933	1933	R. H. Barlow
The Sorcery of Aphlar	1934	1934	Duane W. Rimel
The Thing in the Moonlight	Nov 1927	Jan 1941	J. Chapman Miske
Through the Gates of the Silver Key	Oct 1932 – Apr 1933	Jul 1934	Edgar Hoffmann Price
Till A'the Seas	Jan 1935	Summer 1935	R. H. Barlow
The Trap	c. Summer 1931	Mar 1932	Henry S. Whitehead
The Tree on the Hill	May 1934	Sep 1940	Duane W. Rimel
Two Black Bottles	Jun-Oct 1926	Aug 1927	Wilfred Blanch Talman
In the Walls of Eryx	Jan 1936	Oct 1939	Kenneth Sterling
Winged Death	c. Summer 1932	Mar 1934	Hazel Heald
Satan's Servants	1935	1949	Robert Bloch
The Loved Dead	1919	May 1924	C. M. Eddy Jr.
The Ghost-Eater		Apr 1924	C. M. Eddy Jr.
Deaf, Dumb and Blind		Apr 1925	C. M. Eddy Jr.
Ashes	1923	Mar 1924	C. M. Eddy Jr.

=== Works by August Derleth related to H. P. Lovecraft's works and notes ===
Title	Date
"The Lurker at the Threshold"	1945
"The Survivor"	1954
"The Ancestor"	1957
"The Gable Window"	1957
"The Lamp of Alhazred"	1957
"The Peabody Heritage"	1957
"The Shadow Out of Space"	1957
"Wentworth's Day"	1957
"The Fisherman of Falcon Point"	1959
"The Shuttered Room"	1959
"Witches' Hollow"	1962
"The Shadow in the Attic"	1964
"The Dark Brotherhood"	1966
"The Horror from the Middle Span"	1974
"Innsmouth Clay"	1974
"The Watchers Out of Time"	1974

While put forward as posthumous collaborations while Derleth was alive, the status of these works as collaborations with Lovecraft was swiftly disputed after Derleth’s death. Subsequent critics consider them part of the Cthulhu Mythos, but often split this into the original "Lovecraft Mythos" and the later and lesser "Derleth Mythos".

=== Unknown authorship ===
- "The Inevitable Conflict". This was published in Amazing Stories (December 1930 and January 1931) under the name Paul H. Lovering. A variety of evidence, including statistical analysis of the writing structure, has been put forward to suggest that Lovecraft was not the author.

== Juvenilia ==
- "The Little Glass Bottle" (1896 / 1959)
- "The Noble Eavesdropper" (1897; unpublished, nonextant)
- "The Secret Cave, or John Lees Adventure" (c.1898–1899 / 1959)
- "The Mystery of the Grave-Yard" (c.1898–1899 / 1959)
- "The Secret of the Grave" (before 1902; unpublished, nonextant, may simply be "The Mystery of the Grave-Yard")
- "The Mysterious Ship" (1902 / 1959)
- "The Haunted House" (before 1902; unpublished, nonextant)
- "John, the Detective" (before 1902; unpublished, nonextant)
- "The Beast in the Cave" (Spring 1904–21 April 1905 / June 1918)
- "The Picture" (1907; unpublished, nonextant)
- "The Alchemist" (1908 / November 1916)

== Poetry ==
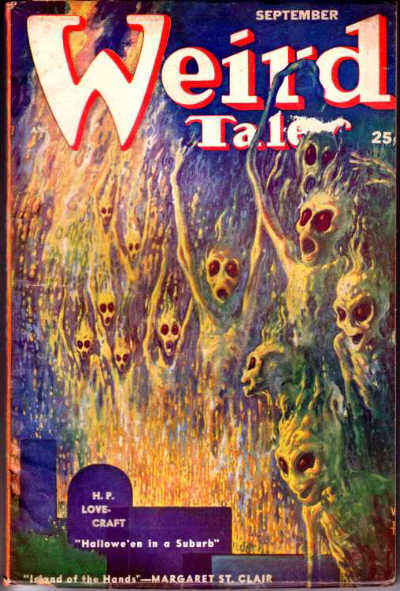
Lovecraft's poem "Hallowe'en in a Suburb" was cover-featured on the September 1952 Weird Tales

Lovecraft's complete poetry is collected in S.T. Joshi (ed), The Ancient Track: Complete Poetical Works of H. P. Lovecraft (NY: Hippocampus Press, 2013. (An earlier, less complete version was published by Night Shade Books in 2001).

- The Solace of Georgian Poetry [xx]
- (Wet) Dream Song [xx]
- To the Recipient of This Volume [xx]
- Dirge of the Doomed [xx]
- To a Cat [xx]
- The Poem of Ulysses, or The Odyssey [November 8, 1897]
- Ovid's Metamorphoses [1898–1902]
- H. Lovecraft's Attempted Journey betwixt Providence & Fall River on the N.Y.N.H. & H.R.R. [1901]
- Poemata Minora, Volume II [1902]
  - Ode to Selene or Diana
  - To the Old Pagan Religion
  - On the Ruin of Rome
  - To Pan
  - On the Vanity of Human Ambition
- C.S.A. 1861–1865: To the Starry Cross of the SOUTH [1902]
- De Triumpho Naturae [July 1905]
- The Members of the Men's Club of the First Universalist Church of Providence, R.I., to Its President, About to Leave for Florida on Account of His Health [c. 1908–12]
- To His Mother on Thanksgiving [November 30, 1911]
- To Mr. Terhune, on His Historical Fiction [c. 1911–13]
- Providence in 2000 A.D. [March 4, 1912]
- New-England Fallen [April 1912]
- On the Creation of Niggers [1912]
- Fragment on Whitman [c. 1912]
- On Robert Browning [c. 1912]
- On a New-England Village Seen by Moonlight [September 7, 1913]
- Quinsnicket Park [1913]
- To Mr. Munroe, on His Instructive and Entertaining Account of Switzerland [January 1, 1914]
- Ad Criticos [January–May? 1914]
- Frusta Praemunitus [June? 1914]
- De Scriptore Mulieroso [June? 1914]
- To General Villa [Summer 1914]
- On a Modern Lothario [July–August 1914]
- The End of the Jackson War [October 1914]
- To the Members of the Pin-Feathers on the Merits of Their Organisation, and of Their New Publication, The Pinfeather [November 1914]
- To the Rev. James Pyke [November 1914]
- To an Accomplished Young Gentlewoman on Her Birthday, Decr. 2, 1914 [December 2? 1914]
- Regner Lodbrog's Epicedium [c. December 1914]
- The Power of Wine: A Satire [c. December 8, 1914]
- The Teuton's Battle-Song [c. December 17, 1914]
- New England [December 18, 1914]
- Gryphus in Asinum Mutatus [1914?]
- To the Members of the United Amateur Press Association from the Providence Amateur Press Club [c. January 1, 1915]
- March [March 1915]
- 1914 [March 1915]
- The Simple Speller's Tale [April 1915]
- On Slang [April 1915]
- An Elegy on Franklin Chase Clark, M.D. [April 29, 1915]
- The Bay-Stater's Policy [June 1915]
- The Crime of Crimes [July 1915]
- Ye Ballade of Patrick von Flynn [c. August 23, 1915]
- The Issacsonio-Mortoniad [c. September 14, 1915]
- On Receiving a Picture of Swans [c. September 14, 1915]
- Unda; or, The Bride of the Sea [c. September 30, 1915]
- On "Unda; or, The Bride of the Sea" [c. September 30, 1915]
- To Charlie of the Comics [c. September 30, 1915]
- Gems from in a Minor Key [October 1915]
- The State of Poetry [October 1915]
- The Magazine Poet [October 1915]
- A Mississippi Autumn [December 1915]
- On the Cowboys of the West [December 1915]
- To Samuel Loveman, Esquire, on His Poetry and Drama, Written in the Elizabethan Style [December 1915]
- An American to Mother England [January 1916]
- The Bookstall [January 1916]
- A Rural Summer Eve [January 1916]
- To the Late John H. Fowler, Esq. [March 1916]
- R. Kleiner, Laureatus, in Heliconem [April 1916]
- Temperance Song [Spring 1916]
- Lines on Gen. Robert Edward Lee [c. May 18, 1916]
- Content [June 1916]
- My Lost Love [c. June 10, 1916]
- The Beauties of Peace [June 27, 1916]
- The Smile [July 1916]
- Epitaph on ye Letterr Rrr........ [August 29, 1916]
- The Dead Bookworm [c. August 29, 1916]
- On Phillips Gamwell [September 1, 1916]
- Inspiration [October 1916]
- Respite [October 1916]
- The Rose of England [October 1916]
- The Unknown [October 1916]
- Ad Balneum [c. October 1916]
- On Kelso the Poet [October? 1916]
- Providence Amateur Press Club (Deceased) to the Athenaeum Club of Journalism [November 24, 1916]
- Brotherhood [December 1916]
- Brumalia [December 1916]
- The Poe-et's Nightmare [1916]
- Futurist Art [January 1917]
- On Receiving a Picture of the Marshes of Ipswich [January 1917]
- The Rutted Road [January 1917]
- An Elegy on Phillips Gamwell, Esq. [January 5, 1917]
- Lines on Graduation from the R.I. Hospital's School of Nurses [c. January 13, 1917]
- Fact and Fancy [February 1917]
- The Nymph's Reply to the Modern Business Man [February 1917]
- Pacifist War Song—1917 [March 1917]
- Percival Lowell [March 1917]
- To Mr. Lockhart, on His Poetry [March 1917]
- Britannia Victura [April 1917]
- Spring [April 1917]
- A Garden [April 1917]
- Sonnet on Myself [April 1917]
- April [April 24, 1917]
- Iterum Conjunctae [May 1917]
- The Peace Advocate [May 1917]
- To Greece, 1917 [May? 1917]
- On Receiving a Picture of ye Towne of Templeton, in the Colonie of Massachusetts-Bay, with Mount Monadnock, in New-Hampshire, Shown in the Distance [June 1917]
- The Poet of Passion [June 1917]
- Earth and Sky [July 1917]
- Ode for July Fourth, 1917 [July 1917]
- On the Death of a Rhyming Critic [July 1917]
- Prologue to "Fragments from an Hour of Inspiration" by Jonathan E. Hoag [July 1917]
- To M.W.M. [July 1917]
- To the Incomparable Clorinda [July 1917]
- To Saccharissa, Fairest of Her Sex [July 1917]
- To Rhodoclia—Peerless among Maidens [July 1917]
- To Belinda, Favourite of the Graces [July 1917]
- To Heliodora—Sister of Cytheraea [July 1917]
- To Mistress Sophia Simple, Queen of the Cinema [August 1917]
- An American to the British Flag [November 1917]
- Autumn [November 1917]
- Nemesis [November 1, 1917]
- Astrophobos [c. November 25, 1917]
- Lines on the 25th. Anniversary of the Providence Evening News, 1892–1917 [December 1917]
- Sunset [December 1917]
- Old Christmas [late 1917]
- To the Arcadian [late 1917]
- To the Nurses of the Red Cross [1917]
- The Introduction [1917?]
- A Summer Sunset and Evening [1917?]
- A Winter Wish [January 2, 1918]
- Laeta; a Lament [February 1918]
- To Jonathan E. Hoag, Esq. [February 1918]
- The Volunteer [February 1918]
- Ad Britannos—1918 [April 1918]
- Ver Rusticum [April 1, 1918]
- To Mr. Kleiner, on Receiving from Him the Poetical Works of Addison, Gay, and Somerville [April 10, 1918]
- A Pastoral Tragedy of Appleton, Wisconsin [c. May 27, 1918]
- On a Battlefield in Picardy [May 30, 1918]
- Psychopompos: A Tale in Rhyme [late 1917-summer 1918]
- A June Afternoon [June 1918]
- The Spirit of Summer [June 27, 1918]
- Grace [July 1918]
- The Link [July 1918]
- To Alan Seeger [July 1918]
- August [August 1918]
- Damon and Delia, a Pastoral [August 1918]
- Phaeton [August 1918]
- To Arthur Goodenough, Esq. [August 20, 1918]
- Hellas [September 1918]
- To Delia, Avoiding Damon [September 1918]
- Alfredo; a Tragedy [September 14, 1918]
- The Eidolon [October 1918]
- Monos: An Ode [October 1918]
- Germania—1918 [November 1918]
- To Col. Linkaby Didd [November 1, 1918]
- Ambition [December 1918]
- A Cycle of Verse [November–December 1918]
  - Oceanus
  - Clouds
  - Mother Earth
- To the Eighth of November [December 13, 1918]
- To the A.H.S.P.C., on Receipt of the Christmas Pippin [December? 1918]
- The Conscript [1918?]
- Greetings [January 1919]
  - To Arthur Goodenough, Esq.[xx]
  - To W. Paul Cook, Esq.[xx]
  - To E. Sherman Cole[xx]
  - To the Silver Clarion[xx]
- Theodore Roosevelt [January 1919]
- To Maj.-Gen. Omar Bundy, U.S.A. [January 1919]
- To Jonathan Hoag, Esq. [February 1919]
- Despair [c. February 19, 1919]
- In Memoriam: J.E.T.D. [March 1919]
- Revelation [March 1919]
- April Dawn [April 10, 1919]
- Amissa Minerva [May 1919]
- Damon: A Monody [May 1919]
- Hylas and Myrrha: A Tale [May 1919]
- North and South Britons [May 1919]
- To the A.H.S.P.C., on Receipt of the May Pippin [May? 1919]
- Helene Hoffman Cole: 1893–1919 [June 1919]
- John Oldham: A Defence [June 1919]
- On Prohibition [June 30, 1919]
- Myrrha and Strephon [July 1919]
- The House [c. July 16, 1919]
- Monody on the Late King Alcohol [August 1919]
- The Pensive Swain [October 1919]
- The City [October 1919]
- Oct 17, 1919 [October 1919]
- On Collaboration [October 20, 1919]
- To Edward John Moreton Drax Plunkett, Eighteenth Baron Dunsany [November 1919]
- Wisdom [November 1919]
- Birthday Lines to Margfred Galbraham [November 1919]
- The Nightmare Lake [December 1919]
- Bells [December 11, 1919]
- January [January 1920]
- To Phillis [January 1920]
- Tryout's Lament for the Vanished Spider [January 1920]
- Ad Scribam [February 1920]
- On Reading Lord Dunsany's Book of Wonder [March 1920]
- To a Dreamer [April 25, 1920]
- Cindy: Scrub Lady in a State Street Skyscraper [June 1920]
- The Poet's Rash Excuse [July 1920]
- With a Copy of Wilde's Fairy Tales [July 1920]
- Ex-Poet's Reply [July? 1920]
- To Two Epgephi [July? 1920]
- On Religion [August 1920]
- The Voice [August 1920]
- On a Grecian Colonnade in a Park [August 20, 1920]
- The Dream [September 1920]
- October 1 [October 1920]
- To S.S.L.—Oct 17, 1920 [October 1920]
- Christmas [November 1920]
- To Alfred Galpin, Esq. [November? 1920]
- Theobaldian Aestivation [November 11, 1920]
- S.S.L.: Christmas 1920 [December? 1920]
- On Receiving a Portraiture of Mrs. Berkeley, ye Poetess [December 25, 1920]
- The Prophecy of Capys Secundus [January 11, 1921]
- To a Youth [February 1921]
- To Mr. Hoag [February 1921]
- The Pathetick History of Sir Wilful Wildrake [Spring? 1921]
- On the Return of Maurice Winter Moe, Esq., to the Pedagogical Profession [June 1921]
- Medusa: A Portrait [November 29, 1921]
- To Mr. Galpin [December 1921]
- Sir Thomas Tryout [December 1921]
- On a Poet's Ninety-first Birthday [February 10, 1922]
- Simplicity: A Poem [c. May 18, 1922]
- To Saml: Loveman, Gent. [Summer? 1922]
- Plaster-All [August? 1922]
- To Zara [August 31, 1922]
- To Damon [November? 1922]
- Waste Paper [late 1922? early 1923?]
- To Rheinhart Kleiner, Esq. [January 1923]
- Chloris and Damon [January 1923]
- To Mr. Hoag [February? 1923]
- To Endymion [April? 1923]
- The Feast [May 1923]
- On Marblehead [July 10, 1923]
- To Mr. Baldwin, on Receiving a Picture of Him in a Rural Bower [September 29, 1923]
- Lines for Poets' Night at the Scribblers' Club [October? 1923]
- On a Scene in Rural Rhode Island [November 8, 1923]
- Damon and Lycë [December 13, 1923]
- To Mr. Hoag [c. February 3, 1924]
- On the Pyramids [c. February 1924]
- Stanzas on Samarkand I-III [February–March 1924]
- Providence [September 26, 1924]
- On The Thing in the Woods by Harper Williams [c. November 29, 1924]
- Solstice [December 25, 1924]
- To Saml Loveman, Esq. [c. January 14, 1925]
- To George Kirk, Esq. [January 18, 1925]
- My Favourite Character [January 31, 1925]
- On the Double-R Coffee House [February 1, 1925]
- To Mr. Hoag [c. February 10, 1925]
- The Cats [February 15, 1925]
- On Rheinhart Kleiner Being Hit by an Automobile [c. February 16, 1925]
- To Xanthippe, on Her Birthday—March 16, 1925 [March 1925]
- Primavera [April 1925]
- To Frank Belknap Long on His Birthday [April? 1925]
- A Year Off [July 24, 1925]
- To an Infant [August 26, 1925]
- On a Politician [c. October 24–27, 1925]
- On a Room for Rent [c. October 24–27, 1925]
- October 2 [October 30, 1925]
- To George Willard Kirk, Gent., of Chelsea-Village, in New-York, upon His Birthday, Novr. 25, 1925 [November 24, 1925]
- On Old Grimes by Albert Gorton Greene [December 1925]
- Festival [December 1925]
- To Jonathan Hoag [February 10, 1926]
- Hallowe'en in a Suburb [March 1926]
- In Memoriam: Oscar Incoul Verelst of Manhattan: 1920–1926 [c. June 28, 1926]
- The Return [December 1926]
- Εις Σφιγγην [December 1926]
- Hedone [January 3, 1927]
- To Miss Beryl Hoyt [February 1927]
- To Jonathan E. Hoag, Esq. [February? 1927]
- On J.F. Roy Erford [June 18, 1927]
- On Ambrose Bierce [c. June 1927]
- On Cheating the Post Office [c. August 14, 1927]
- On Newport, Rhode Island [September 17, 1927]
- The Absent Leader [October 12, 1927]
- Ave atque Vale [October 18, 1927]
- To a Sophisticated Young Gentleman [December 15, 1928]
- The Wood [January 1929]
- An Epistle to the Rt. Honble Maurce Winter Moe, Esq. [July 1929]
- Stanzas on Samarkand IV [November 8, 1929]
- Lines upon the Magnates of the Pulp [November 1929]
- The Outpost [November 26, 1929]
- The Ancient Track [November 26, 1929]
- The Messenger [November 30, 1929]
- The East India Brick Row [December 12, 1929]
- The Fungi From Yuggoth [December 27, 1929 – 4 January 30]
  - I. The Book
  - II. Pursuit
  - III. The Key
  - IV. Recognition
  - V. Homecoming
  - VI. The Lamp
  - VII. Zaman's Hill
  - VIII. The Port
  - IX. The Courtyard
  - X. The Pigeon-Flyers
  - XI. The Well
  - XII. The Howler
  - XIII. Hesperia
  - XIV. Star-Winds
  - XV. Antarktos
  - XVI. The Window
  - XVII. A Memory
  - XVIII. The Gardens of Yin
  - XIX. The Bells
  - XX. Night-Gaunts
  - XXI. Nyarlathotep
  - XXII. Azathoth
  - XXIII. Mirage
  - XXIV. The Canal
  - XXV. St. Toad's
  - XXVI. The Familiars
  - XXVII. The Elder Pharos
  - XXVIII. Expectancy
  - XXIX. Nostalgia
  - XXX. Background
  - XXXI. The Dweller
  - XXXII. Alienation
  - XXXIII. Harbour Whistles
  - XXXIV. Recapture [November 1929]
  - XXXV. Evening Star
  - XXXVI. Continuity
- Veteropinguis Redivivus [Summer 1930?]
- To a Young Poet in Dunedin [c. May 29, 1931]
  - FUNGI from YUGGOTH, 6.Nyarlathotep and 7. Azathoth. Verses printed in Jan. 1931 WEIRD TALES.
- On an Unspoil'd Rural Prospect [August 30, 1931]
- Bouts Rimés [May 23, 1934]
  - Beyond Zimbabwe
  - The White Elephant
- Anthem of the Kappa Alpha Tau [c. August 7, 1934]
- Edith Miniter [September 10, 1934]
- Little Sam Perkins [c. September 17, 1934]
- Metrical Example [February 27, 1935]
- Dead Passion's Flame [Summer 1935]
- Arcadia [Summer 1935]
- Lullaby for the Dionne Quintuplets [Summer 1935]
- The Odes of Horace: Book III, IX [January 22, 1936]
- In a Sequester'd Providence Churchyard Where Once Poe Walk'd [August 8, 1936]
- To Mr. Finlay, upon His Drawing for Mr. Bloch's Tale, "The Faceless God" [c. November 30, 1936]
- To Clark Ashton Smith, Esq., upon His Phantastick Tales, Verses, Pictures, and Sculptures [c. December 11, 1936]
- The Decline and Fall of a Man of the World [n.d.]
- Epigrams [n.d.]
- Gaudeamus [n.d.]
- The Greatest Law [n.d.]
- Life's Mystery [n.d.]
- On Mr. L. Phillips Howard's Profound Poem Entitled "Life's Mystery" [n.d.]
- Nathicana [n.d.]
- On an Accomplished Young Linguist [n.d.]
- "The Poetical Punch" Pushed from His Pedestal [n.d.]
- The Road to Ruin [n.d.]
- Saturnalia [n.d.]
- Sonnet Study [n.d.]
- Sors Poetae [n.d.]
- To Samuel Loveman, Esq. [n.d.]
- To "The Scribblers" [n.d.]
- Verses Designed to Be Sent by a Friend of the Author to His Brother-in-Law on New Year's Day [n.d.]
- Christmas Greetings [n.d.]
  - To Eugene B. Kuntz, et al.
  - To Laurie A. Sawyer
  - To Sonia H. Greene
  - To Rheinhart Kleiner
  - To Felis
  - To Annie E.P. Gamwell
  - To Felis

== Lovecraft’s Revisions of Poetry ==
- A Prayer for Universal Peace, by Robert L. Selle, D.D.
- On the Duke of Leeds, by Unknown
- Mors Omnibus Communis, by Sonia H. Greene
- Alone, by Jonathan E. Hoag
- Unity, by Unknown
- The Dweller, by William Lumley
- Dreams of Yith, by Duane W. Rimel
- On John Donne, by Lee McBride White
- The Wanderer’s Return, by Wilson Shepherd

== Philosophical works ==
- The Crime of the Century (1915)
- The Renaissance of Manhood (1915)
- Liquor and Its Friends (1915)
- More Chain Lightning (1915)
- Old England and the "Hyphen" (1916)
- Revolutionary Mythology (1916)
- The Symphonic Ideal (1916)
- Editors Note to McGavacks "Genesis of the Revolutionary War" (1917)
- A Remarkable Document (1917)
- At the Root (1918)
- Merlinus Redivivus (1918)
- Time and Space (1918)
- Anglo Saxondom (1918)
- Americanism (1919)
- The League (1919)
- Bolshevism (1919)
- Idealism and Materialism – A Reflection (1919)
- Life for Humanity's Sake (1920)
- In Defence of "Dagon" (1921)
- Nietzscheism and Realism (1922)
- East and West Harvard Conservatism (1922)
- The Materialist Today (1926)
- Some Causes of Self-Immolation (1931)
- Some Repetitions on the Times (1933)
- Heritage or Modernism: Common Sense in Art Forms (1935)
- Objections to Orthodox Communism (1936)

== Scientific works ==
- The Art of Fusion, Melting Pudling & Casting (1899)
- Chemistry, 4 volumes (1899)
- A Good Anaesthetic (1899)
- The Railroad Review (1901)
- The Moon (1903)
- The Scientific Gazette (1903–04)
- Astronomy/The Monthly Almanack (1903–04)
- The Rhode Island Journal of Astronomy (1903–07)
- Annals of the Providence Observatory (1904)
- Providence Observatory Forecast (1904)
- The Science Library, 3 volumes (1904)
- Astronomy articles for The Pawtuxet Valley Gleaner (1906)
- Astronomy articles for The Providence Tribune (1906–08)
- Third Annual Report of the Providence Meteorological Station (1906)
- Celestial Objects for All (1907)
- Astronomical Notebook (1909–15)
- Astronomy articles for The Providence Evening News (1914–18)
- "Bickerstaffe" articles from The Providence Evening News (1914)
  - "Science versus Charlatanry" (September 9, 1914)
  - "The Falsity of Astrology" (October 10, 1914)
  - "Astrology and the Future" (October 13, 1914)
  - "Delavan's Comet and Astrology" (October 26, 1914)
  - "The Fall of Astrology" (December 17, 1914)
- Astronomy articles for The Asheville Gazette-News (1915)
- Editor's Note to MacManus' "The Irish and the Fairies" (1916)
- The Truth about Mars (1917)

== Miscellaneous writings ==
- A Task for Amateur Journalists (1914)
- Departments of Public Criticism (1914–19)
- What Is Amateur Journalism? (1915)
- Consolidations Autopsy (1915)
- Consolidation's Autopsy (1915)
- The Amateur Press (1915)
- The Morris Faction (1915)
- For President – Leo Fritter (1915)
- Introducing Mr. Chester Pierce Munroe (1915)
- The Question of the Day (1915)
- Random Notes, from The Conservative (1915)
- Editorials, from The Conservative (1915)
- Finale (1915)
- New Department Proposed: Instruction for the New Recruit (1915)
- Amateur Notes (1915)
- Some Political Phases (1915)
- Introducing Mr. John Russell (1915)
- In a Major Key (1915)
- The Conservative and His Critics (1915)
- The Dignity of Journalism (1915)
- The Youth of Today (1915)
- An Impartial Spectator (1915)
- Symphony and Stress (1915)
- Little Journeys to the Homes of Prominent Amateurs (1915)
- Metrical Regularity (1915)
- The Allowable Rhyme (1915)
- Reports of the First Vice-President (1915–16)
- Systematic Instruction in the United (1915–16)
- The Proposed Authors Union (1916)
- Introducing Mr. James T. Pyke (1916)
- Editorial, from The Providence Amateur (1916)
- United Amateur Press Association: Exponent of Amateur Journalism (1916)
- Among the New-Comers (1916)
- Among the Amateurs (1916)
- The Vers Libre Epidemic (1917)
- Concerning "Persia – In Europe" (1917)
- Amateur Standards (1917)
- A Request (1917)
- A Reply to The Lingerer (1917)
- Editorially (1917)
- News Notes (1917)
- The United's Problem (1917)
- Little Journeys to the Homes of Prominent Amateurs (1917)
- President's Messages, from The United Amateur (1917–18)
- Poesy (1918)
- The Despised Pastoral (1918)
- The Literature of Rome (1918)
- The Simple Spelling Mania (1918)
- Comment (1918)
- Les Mouches fantastiques (1918)
- Amateur Criticism (1918)
- The United: 1917–1918 (1918)
- The Amateur Press Club (1918)
- The Case for Classicism (1919)
- Literary Composition (1919)
- Helene Hoffman Cole – Littérateur (1919)
- Trimmings (1919)
- For Official Editor – Anne Tillery Renshaw (1919)
- Amateurdom (1919)
- The Brief Autobiography of an Inconsequential Scribbler (1919)
- Commonplace Book (1919–1935)
- Looking Backward (1920)
- For What Does the United Stand? (1920)
- Untitled, from The Tryout (1920)
- Editor's Note to Loveman's "A Scene for Macbeth" (1920)
- Amateur Journalism – Its Possible Needs and Betterment (1920)
- The Pseudo-United (1920)
- Untitled Fragments, from The United Amateur (1920–1)
- Editorials, from The United Amateur (1920–5)
- News Notes (1920–5)
- Winifred Virginia Jackson: A Different Poetess (1921)
- Ars Gratia Artis (1921)
- What Amateur Journalism and I Have Done for Each Other (1921)
- Lucubrations Lovecraftian (1921)
- Within the Gates (1921)
- The Vivisector (1921–23)
- The Haverhill Convention (1921–23)
- The Convention Banquet (1921–23)
- "Rainbow" Called Best First Issue (1922)
- The Poetry of Lilian Middleton (1922)
- Lord Dunsany and His Work (1922)
- A Confession of Unfaith (1922)
- President's Messages, from The National Amateur (1922–23)
- Rudis Indigestaque Moles (1923)
- Introduction to Hoags Poetical Works (1923)
- In the Editors Study (1923)
- Random Notes on Philistine-Grecian Controversy (1923)
- Review of Ebony and Crystal by Clark Ashton Smith (1923)
- Bureau of Critics (1923)
- Random Notes, from The Conservative (1923)
- The President's Annual Report (1923)
- Rursus Adsumus (1923)
- The Professional Incubus (1924)
- The Omnipresent Philistine (1924)
- "The Work of Frank Belknap Long, Jr." (1924)
- Diary (1925)
- Commercial Blurbs (1925)
- Supernatural Horror in Literature (1925–1927)
- Cats and Dogs (1926)
- Preface to Bullens White Fire (1927)
- A Matter of Uniteds (1927)
- The Trip of Theobald (1927)
- Vermont – A First Impression (1927)
- Preface to Symmes Old World Footprints (1928)
- Observations on Several Parts of America (1928)
- An Account of a Trip to the Fairbanks House (1929)
- Travels in the Provinces of America (1929)
- Notes on Hudson Valley History (1929)
- Notes on Alias Peter Marchall by A. F. Lorenz (1929?)
- An Account of a Visit to Charleston (1930)
- An Account of Charleston (1930)
- The Convention (1930)
- Autobiography of Howard Phillips Lovecraft (1930–...)
- A Description of the Town of Quebeck, in New France, Lately Added to His Britannic Majesty's Dominions (1930–31)
- European Glimpses (1932) (revision of Sonia Greene's journey report)
- Correspondence between Wilson Shepherd and R. H. Barlow (1932)
- In Memoriam: Henry St. Claire Whitehead (1932)
- Notes on Verse Technique (1932)
- Foreword to Kuntzs Thoughts and Pictures (1932)
- Bureau of Critics (1932–36)
- Some Notes on a Nonentity (1933)
- Some Dutch Footprints in New England (1933)
- Some Notes on a Nonentity (1933)
- Notes on Weird Fiction (1933)
- Weird Story Plots (1933)
- Notes on Writing Weird Fiction (1934)
- Mrs. Miniter – Estimates and Recollections (1934)
- Homes and Shrines of Poe (1934)
- The Unknown City in the Ocean (1934)
- Some Notes on Interplanetary Fiction (1935)
- What Belongs in Verse (1935)
- Dr. Eugene B. Kuntz (1935)
- Some Current Motives and Practices (1936)
- Charleston (1936)
- Literary Review (1936)
- Defining the "Ideal" Paper (1936)
- Report of the Executive Judges (1936)
- Suggestions for a Reading Guide (1936)
- In Memoriam: Robert Ervin Howard (1936)
- Death Diary (1937)

== Reprintings and collections ==
The following are modern reprintings and collections of Lovecraft's work. This list includes only editions by select publishers; therefore, this list is not exhaustive:

- From Arkham House
  - with corrected texts by S. T. Joshi:
    - At the Mountains of Madness and Other Novels (7th corrected printing), S. T. Joshi (ed.), 1985. (ISBN 0-87054-038-6)
    - Dagon and Other Macabre Tales, S. T. Joshi (ed.), 1987. (ISBN 0-87054-039-4)
    - The Dunwich Horror and Others (9th corrected printing), S. T. Joshi (ed.), 1984. (ISBN 0-87054-037-8)
    - The Horror in the Museum and Other Revisions, S.T. Joshi (ed.), 1989. (ISBN 0-87054-040-8)
  - Miscellaneous Writings (ISBN 0-87054-168-4)
- From Arktos
  - The Conservative: The Complete Issues 1915–1923 (ISBN 978-1-907166-30-3)
- From Ballantine/Del Rey:
  - The Tomb and Other Tales (ISBN 0-345-33661-5)
  - Tales of the Cthulhu Mythos (ISBN 0-345-42204-X)
  - The Doom That Came to Sarnath and Other Stories (ISBN 0-345-33105-2)
  - The Lurking Fear and Other Stories (ISBN 0-345-32604-0)
  - The Dream-Quest of Unknown Kadath (ISBN 0-345-33779-4)
  - The Case of Charles Dexter Ward (ISBN 0-345-35490-7)
  - At the Mountains of Madness and Other Tales of Terror (ISBN 0-345-32945-7)
  - The Best of H. P. Lovecraft: Bloodcurdling Tales of Horror and the Macabre (ISBN 0-345-35080-4)
  - The Transition of H. P. Lovecraft: The Road to Madness (ISBN 0-345-38422-9)
  - The Dream Cycle of H. P. Lovecraft: Dreams of Terror and Death (ISBN 0-345-38421-0)
  - Waking Up Screaming: Haunting Tales of Terror (ISBN 0-345-45829-X)
  - Pickman's Model By H.P. Lovecraft First Published in "Weird Tales" in 1927
- From Barnes & Noble:
  - H.P. Lovecraft: The Complete Fiction (Barnes & Noble Leatherbound Classics Series) (ISBN 978-1435122963)
- From Canterbury Classics
  - H. P. Lovecraft Tales of Horror (ISBN 978-1-6071093-2-7)
- From Classic CD Books:
  - Early Horror Works (ISBN 978-0-9764805-2-5)
  - More Early Horror Works (ISBN 978-0-9764805-6-3)
- From Donald M. Grant, publisher, Inc.:
  - To Quebec and the Stars
- From Ecco Press:
  - Tales of H.P. Lovecraft (with an introduction by Joyce Carol Oates) (ISBN 0-88001-541-1)
- From Gollancz:
  - Necronomicon: The Best Weird Tales of H.P. Lovecraft: Commemorative Edition (edited with an afterword by Stephen Jones) ISBN 978-0-575-08156-7 Cased; 978-0-575081-574 Export trade paperback.
- From HarperCollins:
  - Omnibus 1: At the Mountains of Madness (ISBN 0-586-06322-6)
  - Omnibus 2: Dagon and other Macabre Tales (ISBN 0-586-06324-2)
  - Omnibus 3: The Haunter of the Dark (ISBN 0-586-06323-4)
- From Hippocampus Press:
  - The Shadow out of Time (ISBN 0-9673215-3-0)
  - From the Pest Zone: The New York Stories (ISBN 0-9673215-8-1)
  - The Annotated Fungi From Yuggoth (ISBN 0-9721644-7-2)
  - Collected Essays (ISBN 0-9721644-1-3)
    - Volume 1. Amateur Journalism
    - Volume 2. Literary Criticism
    - Volume 3. Science
    - Volume 4. Travel
    - Volume 5: Philosophy; Autobiography and Miscellany (December 2006)
    - CD-ROM (2007)
  - The Annotated Supernatural Horror in Literature (ISBN 0-9673215-0-6)
  - H. P. Lovecraft: Letters to Alfred Galpin (ISBN 0-9673215-9-X)
  - H. P. Lovecraft: Letters To Rheinhart Kleiner (ISBN 0-9748789-5-2)
  - H. P. Lovecraft: Letters to Robert Bloch and Others (ISBN 9781614981374)
  - H. P. Lovecraft: Letters to Elizabeth Toldridge & Anne Tillery Renshaw (ISBN 978-1-61498-059-9)
  - H. P. Lovecraft: Letters To James F. Morton (ISBN 978-0-9844802-3-4)
  - H. P. Lovecraft: Letters to J. Vernon Shea and Others (ISBN 978-1-61498-156-5)
  - H. P. Lovecraft: Letters to Duane W. Rimel and Others (ISBN 978-1-61498-157-2)
  - Essential Solitude: The Letters of H. P. Lovecraft and August Derleth: 1926–1931 (ISBN 9780979380648)
  - The Ancient Track: The Complete Poetical Works of H. P. Lovecraft (ISBN 9781892389152). This 2013 revised edition supersedes the 2001 edition from Night Shade Books, with around twelve additional poems or fragments included.
- From The Library of America
  - H. P. Lovecraft: Tales (Peter Straub, editor) (ISBN 978-1-931082-72-3)
- From Morrow:
  - Great Ghost Stories (1998) (Compiled by Peter Glassman, Illustrated by Barry Moser)
- From Night Shade Books:
  - The Ancient Track: The Complete Poetical Works of H. P. Lovecraft (ISBN 1-892389-16-9)
  - Mysteries of Time and Spirit: The Letters of H. P. Lovecraft and Donald Wandrei (ISBN 1-892389-49-5)
  - Lovecraft Letters Volume 2: Letters from New York (ISBN 1-892389-37-1)
- From Ohio University Press:
  - H. P. Lovecraft: Lord of a Visible World An Autobiography in Letters edited by S.T. Joshi and David E. Schultz (ISBN 0-8214-1333-3)
- From Penguin Classics:
  - The Call of Cthulhu and Other Weird Stories (ISBN 0-14-118234-2)
  - The Thing on the Doorstep and Other Weird Stories (ISBN 0-14-218003-3)
  - The Dreams in the Witch House and Other Weird Stories (ISBN 0-14-243795-6)
- From Sporting Gentlemen:
  - Against Religion (ISBN 978-0-578-05248-9)
- From The Palingenesis Project:
  - Supernatural Horror in Literature (ISBN 978-1-909606-00-5)
- From Arcane Wisdom:
  - The Crawling Chaos and Others: The Annotated Revisions and Collaborations of H.P. Lovecraft, Volume 1 (ISBN 978-1-935006-15-2)
  - Medusa's Coil and Others: The Annotated Revisions and Collaborations of H.P. Lovecraft, Volume 2 (ISBN 978-1-935006-16-9)
- Interactive for iPad, The Call of Cthulhu

== General and cited sources ==
- Joshi, S. T. (2009). H.P. Lovecraft: A Comprehensive Bibliography. Tampa, FL: University of Tampa Press. ISBN 9781597320689.
- Joshi, S. T. (2002). H.P. Lovecraft and Lovecraft Criticism: An Annotated Bibliography. Holicong, PA: Wildside Press. ISBN 1592240127.
- Owings, Mark; Chalker, Jack L. (1973). The Revised H.P. Lovecraft Bibliography. Baltimore: Mirage Press. ISBN 0883580101.
