= Miscellaneous Writings (Lovecraft) =

Collection of literary works by H. P. Lovecraft

- Dust-jacket illustration by James Turner for Miscellaneous Writings
- Author: H. P. Lovecraft
- Cover artist: James Turner
- Language: English
- Genre: fantasy, horror short stories, essay, biography, letters
- Publisher: Arkham House
- Publication date: 1995
- Publication place: United States
- Media type: Print (hardback)
- Pages: xii, 568 pp
- ISBN: 0-87054-168-4
- OCLC: 30733463
- Dewey Decimal: 813/.52 20
- LC Class: PS3523.O833 A6 1995

Miscellaneous Writings is a collection of short stories, essays and letters by author H. P. Lovecraft. It was released in 1995 by Arkham House in an edition of 4,959 copies. The volume was originally conceived by August Derleth and ultimately edited by S.T. Joshi with input from James Turner.

== Contents ==
Miscellaneous Writings contains the following:

- "Introduction", by S.T. Joshi
- I. Dreams and Fancies
  - "The Little Glass Bottle"
  - "The Secret Cave"
  - "The Mystery of the Grave-Yard"
  - "The Mysterious Ship"
  - "A Reminiscence of Dr. Samuel Johnson"
  - "Old Bugs"
  - "Memory"
  - "Nyarlathotep"
  - "Ex Oblivione"
  - "What the Moon Brings"
  - "Sweet Ermengarde"
  - "The Very Old Folk"
  - "History of the Necronomicon"
  - "Ibid"
  - Discarded Draft of "The Shadow Over Innsmouth"
  - "The Battle That Ended the Century" (with R.H. Barlow)
  - "Collapsing Cosmoses" (with R.H. Barlow)
  - "The Challenge From Beyond" (with C.L. Moore, A. Merritt, Robert E. Howard and Frank Belknap Long) [only Lovecraft's contribution to the story]
- II. The Weird Fantasist
  - "Commonplace Book"
  - "Lord Dunsany and His Work"
  - "Notes on Writing Weird Fiction"
  - "Some Notes on Interplanetary Fiction"
  - "In Memoriam: Robert E. Howard"
- III. Mechanistic Materialist
  - "Idealism and Materialism—A Reflection"
  - "Life for Humanity's Sake"
  - "In Defense of Dagon"
  - "Nietzscheism and Realism"
  - "The Materialist Today"
  - "Some Causes of Self-Immolation"
  - "Heritage or Modernism: Common Sense in Art Forms"
- IV. Literary Critic
  - "Metrical Regularity"
  - "The Vers Libre Epidemic"
  - "The Case for Classicism"
  - "Literary Composition"
  - "Ars Gratia Artis"
  - "The Poetry of Lilian Middleton"
  - "Rudis Indigestaque Moles"
  - "In the Editor's Study"
  - "The Professional Incubus"
  - "The Omnipresent Philistine"
  - "What Belongs in Verse"
- V. Political Theorist
  - "The Crime of the Century"
  - "More Chain Lightning"
  - "Old England and the 'Hyphen'"
  - "Revolutionary Mythology"
  - "Americanism"
  - "The League"
  - "Bolshevism"
  - "Some Repetitions on the Times"
- VI. Antiquarian Travels
  - "Vermont—A First Impression"
  - "Observations on Several Parts of America"
  - "Travels in the Provinces of America"
  - "An Account of Charleston"
  - "Some Dutch Footprints in New England"
  - "Homes and Shrines of Poe"
- VII. Amateur Journalist
  - "In a Major Key"
  - "The Dignity of Journalism"
  - "Symphony and Stress"
  - "United Amateur Press Association: Exponent of Amateur Journalism"
  - "A Reply to The Lingerer"
  - "Les Mouches fantastiques"
  - "For What Does the United Stand?"
  - "Amateur Journalism: Its Possible Needs and Betterment"
  - "What Amateurdom and I have Done for Each Other"
  - "Lucubrations Lovecraftian"
  - "A Matter of Uniteds"
  - "Mrs. Miniter—-Estimates and Recollections"
  - "Some Current Motives and Practices"
- VIII. Epistolarian
  - "Trans-Neptunian Planets"
  - "The Earth Not Hollow"
  - "To The All-Story Weekly"
  - "Science versus Charlatanry"
  - "The Fall of Astrology"
  - "To Edwin Baird"
  - "To Edwin Baird"
  - "The Old Brick Row"
  - "To Nils H. Frome"
- IX. Personal
  - "The Brief Autobiography of an Inconsequential Scribbler"
  - "Within the Gates"
  - "A Confession of Unfaith"
  - "Commercial Blurbs"
  - "Cats and Dogs"
  - "Some Notes on a Nonentity"
- "Bibliography"
