= Beyond the Wall of Sleep (collection) =

1943 collection of short stories, poems and essays by H. P. Lovecraft

- Dust-jacket photograph by Burt Trimpey for Beyond the Wall of Sleep
- Author: H. P. Lovecraft
- Cover artist: Burt Trimpey and Clark Ashton Smith
- Language: English
- Genre: Fantasy, Horror, Science fiction short stories, poetry, essay
- Publisher: Arkham House
- Publication date: 1943
- Publication place: United States
- Media type: Print (hardback)
- Pages: xxix, 458

Beyond the Wall of Sleep is a collection of fantasy, horror and science fiction short stories, poems and essays by American author H. P. Lovecraft. It was released in 1943 and was the second collection of Lovecraft's work published by Arkham House. 1,217 copies were printed. The volume is named for the Lovecraft short story "Beyond the Wall of Sleep".

The stories for this volume were selected by August Derleth and Donald Wandrei. The dust jacket art was a collage of photographs of sculptures by Clark Ashton Smith.

== Contents ==
Beyond the Wall of Sleep contains these texts. Items 1-4, 100, and 101 are essays; 5-8 and 34-99 are poems; while 9-33 are stories.

1. "By Way of Introduction", by August Derleth & Donald Wandrei
2. "Autobiography: Some Notes on a Nonentity"
3. "The Commonplace Book"
4. "History and Chronology of the Necronomicon"
5. "Memory"
6. "What the Moon Brings"
7. "Nyarlathotep"
8. "Ex Oblivione"
9. "The Tree"
10. "The Other Gods"
11. "The Quest of Iranon"
12. "The Doom That Came to Sarnath"
13. "The White Ship"
14. "From Beyond"
15. "Beyond the Wall of Sleep"
16. "The Unnamable"
17. "The Hound"
18. "The Moon-Bog"
19. "The Evil Clergyman"
20. "Herbert West--Reanimator"
21. "The Dream-Quest of Unknown Kadath"
22. "The Case of Charles Dexter Ward"
23. "The Crawling Chaos" (with Elizabeth Berkeley)
24. "The Green Meadow" (with Elizabeth Berkeley)
25. "The Curse of Yig" (with Zealia Brown-Reed)
26. "The Horror in the Museum" (with Hazel Heald)
27. "Out of the Eons" (with Hazel Heald)
28. "The Mound" (with Zealia Brown-Reed)
29. "The Diary of Alonzo Typer" (with William Lumley)
30. "The Challenge from Beyond" (with C. L. Moore, A. Merritt, Robert E. Howard, and Frank Belknap Long)
31. "In the Walls of Eryx" (with Kenneth Sterling)
32. "Ibid"
33. "Sweet Ermengarde"
34. "Providence"
35. "On a Grecian Colonnade in a Park"
36. "Old Christmas"
37. "New England Fallen"
38. "On a New England Village Seen by Moonlight"
39. "Astrophobos"
40. "Sunset"
41. "A Year Off"
42. "A Summer Sunset and Evening"
43. "To Mistress Sophia Simple, Queen of the Cinema"
44. "The Ancient Track"
45. "The Eidolon"
46. "The Nightmare Lake"
47. "The Outpost"
48. "The Rutted Road"
49. "The Wood"
50. "Hallowe'en in a Suburb"
51. "Primavera"
52. "October"
53. "To a Dreamer"
54. "Despair"
55. "Nemesis"
56. "Psychopompos"
57. "The Book"
58. "Pursuit"
59. "The Key"
60. "Recognition"
61. "Homecoming"
62. "The Lamp"
63. "Zaman's Hill"
64. "The Port"
65. "The Courtyard"
66. "The Pigeon-Flyers"
67. "The Well"
68. "The Howler"
69. "Hesperia"
70. "Star-Winds"
71. "Antarktos"
72. "The Window"
73. "A Memory"
74. "The Gardens of Yin"
75. "The Bells"
76. "Night-Gaunts"
77. "Nyarlathotep"
78. "Azathoth"
79. "Mirage"
80. "The Canal"
81. "St. Toad’s"
82. "The Familiars"
83. "The Elder Pharos"
84. "Expectancy"
85. "Nostalgia"
86. "Background"
87. "The Dweller"
88. "Alienation"
89. "Harbour Whistles"
90. "Recapture"
91. "Evening Star"
92. "Continuity"
93. "Yule Horror"
94. "To Mr. Finlay"
95. "To Clark Ashton Smith"
96. "Where Once Poe Walked"
97. "Christmas Greetings to Mrs. Phillips Gamwell"
98. "Brick Row"
99. "The Messenger"
100. "The Cthulhu Mythology: A Glossary" by Francis T. Laney
101. "An Appreciation of H. P. Lovecraft" by W. Paul Cook

Although the story and poetry selections have appeared in other Lovecraft collections, Beyond the Wall of Sleep has never been reprinted in its original form.

== Influenced ==
'Beyond the Wall of Sleep' is a song on the debut album of the influential Heavy Metal band Black Sabbath.

== Reception ==
New York Times reviewer William Poster noted that this second Lovecraft collection comprised mostly the author's "lesser writings," faulting in particular his poems and prose poems, which "tend to reveal his weaknesses rather than reveal his stature. Without the coloring excitement of narrative suspense and climax his language seems thin and obvious, getting most of its effects by the hypnotic repetition or judicious timing of adjectives like 'slimy,' 'nameless,' or 'loathsome.'" E. F. Bleiler described Beyond as "really an afterthought volume", commenting that "The fiction is almost all minor, although The Case of Charles Dexter Ward, despite its being strangely tired and routine, has interesting concepts and good moments".

== Sources ==
- Jaffery, Sheldon (1989). The Arkham House Companion. Mercer Island, WA: Starmont House, Inc. pp. 5–6. ISBN 1-55742-005-X.
- Nielsen, Leon (2004). Arkham House Books: A Collector's Guide. Jefferson, NC and London: McFarland & Company, Inc. pp. 49–50. ISBN 0-7864-1785-4.
- Chalker, Jack L.; Mark Owings (1998). The Science-Fantasy Publishers: A Bibliographic History, 1923-1998. Westminster, MD and Baltimore: Mirage Press, Ltd. p. 27.
