= The Doom That Came to Sarnath and Other Stories =

Short story collection by Howard Phillips Lovecraft

- Cover of the first edition.
- Author: H. P. Lovecraft
- Cover artist: Gervasio Gallardo
- Language: English
- Series: Ballantine Adult Fantasy series
- Genre: Fantasy
- Publisher: Ballantine Books
- Publication date: 1971
- Publication place: United States
- Media type: Print (paperback)
- Pages: 208
- Preceded by: The Dream-Quest of Unknown Kadath

The Doom That Came to Sarnath and Other Stories is a collection of fantasy and horror stories by H. P. Lovecraft, edited by Lin Carter. It was first published in paperback by Ballantine Books as the twenty-sixth volume of its Ballantine Adult Fantasy series in February 1971. It was the second collection of Lovecraft's works assembled by Carter for the series, the first being The Dream-Quest of Unknown Kadath. The stories were written between 1919 and 1935, and originally published in various fantasy magazines, notably Weird Tales.

The book collects twenty tales from the author's two main series of short stories, the Dream Cycle of Dunsanian fantasies and the Cthulhu Mythos of science fictional horror, with a general introduction, notes, and a partial chronology of Lovecraft's works by the editor. The book is dedicated to Lovecraft's friend, correspondent and posthumous publisher August Derleth.

== Contents ==
- "Introduction" (Lin Carter)
- "The Other Gods" (1921)
- "The Tree" (1920)
- "The Doom That Came to Sarnath" (1919)
- "The Tomb" (1917)
- "Polaris" (1918)
- "Beyond the Wall of Sleep" (1919)
- "Memory" (1919)
- "What the Moon Brings" (1923)
- "Nyarlathotep" (1920)
- "Ex Oblivione" (1921)
- "The Cats of Ulthar" (1920)
- "Hypnos" (1922)
- "Nathicana" (1927)
- "From Beyond" (1920)
- "The Festival" (1923)
- "The Nameless City" (1921)
- "The Quest of Iranon" (1921)
- "The Crawling Chaos" (1920)
- "In the Walls of Eryx" (1935)
- "Imprisoned with the Pharaohs" (1924)
