= The Shuttered Room and Other Pieces =

Collection of works by Howard Phillips Lovecraft

- Dust jacket illustration by Richard Taylor
- Author: H. P. Lovecraft and others (edited by August Derleth)
- Cover artist: Richard Taylor
- Language: English
- Genre: Fantasy, horror, essays, memoir
- Publisher: Arkham House
- Publication date: 1959
- Publication place: United States
- Media type: Print (Hardback)
- Pages: xiv, 313

The Shuttered Room and Other Pieces is an anthology of fantasy and horror short stories, essays and memoirs by American author H. P. Lovecraft and others. It was released in 1959 by Arkham House in an edition of 2,527 copies and was the fifth collection of Lovecraft's work to be released by Arkham House. August Derleth, the owner of Arkham House, and an admirer and literary executor to Lovecraft, edited the collection and wrote the title story, "The Shuttered Room", as well as another story, "The Fisherman of Falcon Point" from lines of story ideas left by Lovecraft after his death. Derleth billed himself as a "posthumous collaborator".

Although most copies of this volume have the usual Holliston Black Novilex binding used by Arkham House at this period, there are reportedly some copies (possibly a few dozen) with less sturdy "board" covers made of a softer material and without the dustjacket. These may constitute a variant state of the volume.

== Film ==
A British film titled The Shuttered Room based on the eponymous short story was released in 1967.

== Contents ==
The Shuttered Room and Other Pieces contains the following pieces:

1. "Foreword", by August Derleth
2. "The Shuttered Room" by August Derleth (inspired by notes by H.P. Lovecraft)
3. "The Fisherman of Falcon Point" by August Derleth (inspired by notes by H.P. Lovecraft)
4. "The Little Glass Bottle" by H.P. Lovecraft
5. "The Secret Cave" by H.P. Lovecraft
6. "The Mystery of the Graveyard" by H.P. Lovecraft
7. "The Mysterious Ship" by H.P. Lovecraft
8. "The Alchemist" by H.P. Lovecraft
9. "Poetry and the Gods" by H.P. Lovecraft
10. "The Street" by H.P. Lovecraft
11. "Old Bugs" by H. P. Lovecraft
12. "Idealism and Materialism: A Reflection" by H. P. Lovecraft
13. "The Commonplace Book of H. P. Lovecraft" annotated by August Derleth and Donald Wandrei
14. "Lovecraft in Providence" by Donald Wandrei
15. "Lovecraft as Mentor" by August Derleth
16. "Out of the Ivory Tower" by Robert Bloch
17. "Three Hours With H. P. Lovecraft" by Dorothy C. Walter
18. "Memories of a Friendship" by Alfred Galpin
19. "Homage to H. P. Lovecraft" by Felix Stefanile
20. "H.P.L." by Clark Ashton Smith
21. "Lines to H. P. Lovecraft" by Joseph Payne Brennan
22. "Revenants" by August Derleth
23. "The Barlow Tributes" by R.H. Barlow
24. "H. P. Lovecraft: The Books" by Lin Carter
25. "H. P. Lovecraft: The Gods" by Lin Carter
26. "Addendum: Some Observations on the Carter Glossary" by T.G.L. Cockcroft
27. "Notes on the Cthulhu Mythos" by George T. Wetzel
28. "Lovecraft's First Book" by William L. Crawford
29. "Dagon" by H. P. Lovecraft
30. "The Strange High House in the Mist" by H. P. Lovecraft
31. "The Outsider" by H. P. Lovecraft

== Reception ==
Damon Knight reviewed the collection unfavorably, saying of the title story that "the protagonist's continued obtuseness drives the reader to chew paper" and faulting Lovecraft as a writer whose stories "are only endlessly retraced beginnings."

== Sources ==
- Jaffery, Sheldon (1989). The Arkham House Companion. Mercer Island, WA: Starmont House, Inc. pp. 51–52. ISBN 1-55742-005-X.
- Chalker, Jack L.; Mark Owings (1998). The Science-Fantasy Publishers: A Bibliographic History, 1923-1998. Westminster, MD and Baltimore: Mirage Press, Ltd. p. 36.
- Joshi, S.T. (1999). Sixty Years of Arkham House: A History and Bibliography. Sauk City, WI: Arkham House. pp. 66–67. ISBN 0-87054-176-5.
- Nielsen, Leon (2004). Arkham House Books: A Collector's Guide. Jefferson, NC and London: McFarland & Company, Inc. pp. 79–80. ISBN 0-7864-1785-4.
