= The Watchers Out of Time and Others =

1974 collection of stories by August Derleth

- Dust jacket illustration by Herb Arnold for The Watchers Out of Time and Others
- Author: H. P. Lovecraft and August Derleth
- Cover artist: Herb Arnold
- Language: English
- Genre: Science fiction, fantasy, horror
- Publisher: Arkham House
- Publication date: 1974
- Publication place: United States
- Media type: Print (hardback)
- Pages: ix, 405
- ISBN: 0-87054-033-5
- OCLC: 232354670

The Watchers Out of Time and Others is an omnibus collection of stories by American writer August Derleth, inspired in part by notes left by H. P. Lovecraft after his death and presented as a "posthumous collaboration" between the two writers (Derleth acted as Lovecraft's literary executor). It was published in an edition of 5,070 copies. Several of the stories relate to the Cthulhu Mythos and had appeared previously in the earliest collections The Lurker at the Threshold, The Survivor and Others, The Shuttered Room and Other Pieces, The Dark Brotherhood and Other Pieces and other Arkham House publications.

Some controversy exists among Lovecraft's admirers as to the ethics of presenting the stories as collaborative works. Upon this volume's publication, Donald Wandrei, one of Arkham House's founders, wrote letters to reviewers complaining that the stories were essentially Derleth's own works, incorporating fragments of unpublished Lovecraft prose. Gahan Wilson agreed that the stories "should really be billed as being [Derleth's] own, and merely based on the notes and letters of Lovecraft, and on the Lovecraftian mythos as [Derleth] saw it, and no more than that."

== Contents ==
1. "Foreword", by April Derleth
2. The Lurker at the Threshold
3. "The Survivor"
4. "Wentworth's Day"
5. "The Peabody Heritage"
6. "The Gable Window"
7. "The Ancestor"
8. "The Shadow Out of Space"
9. "The Lamp of Alhazred"
10. "The Shuttered Room"
11. "The Fisherman of Falcon Point"
12. "Witches' Hollow"
13. "The Shadow in the Attic"
14. "The Dark Brotherhood"
15. "The Horror from the Middle Span"
16. "Innsmouth Clay"
17. "The Watchers Out of Time"

=== Notes ===
The title story at the end of the book was left incomplete and unfinished at the time of Derleth's death.

== Sources ==
- Jaffery, Sheldon (1989). The Arkham House Companion. Mercer Island, WA: Starmont House, Inc. pp. 107–108. ISBN 1-55742-005-X.
- Chalker, Jack L.; Mark Owings (1998). The Science-Fantasy Publishers: A Bibliographic History, 1923-1998. Westminster, MD and Baltimore: Mirage Press, Ltd. pp. 50–51.
- Joshi, S.T. (1999). Sixty Years of Arkham House: A History and Bibliography. Sauk City, WI: Arkham House. pp. 131–132. ISBN 0-87054-176-5.
- Nielsen, Leon (2004). Arkham House Books: A Collector's Guide. Jefferson, NC and London: McFarland & Company, Inc. p. 118. ISBN 0-7864-1785-4.
