= Fanciful Tales of Time and Space =

Semi-professional science fiction magazine

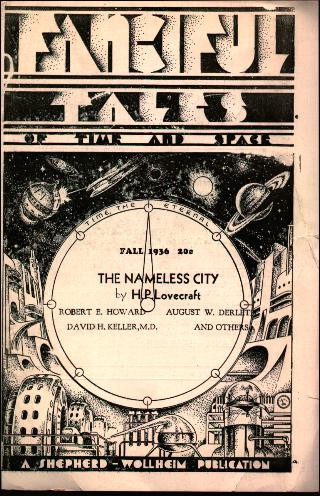
Cover of the only issue, by Clay Ferguson, Jr.

Fanciful Tales of Time and Space was a semi-professional science fiction and fantasy magazine which published one issue in 1936. It was published by Donald A. Wollheim and Wilson Shepherd, two young science fiction fans; Wollheim was based in New York City, but the magazine was printed in Oakman, Alabama, where Shepherd had a letter press.

Fanciful Tales included H.P. Lovecraft's "The Nameless City", which Lovecraft had written in 1921; and also included the first printing of Robert E. Howard's poem "Solomon Kane's Homecoming". Other authors included David H. Keller, August Derleth, Duane Rimel, William S. Sykora, Kenneth Pritchard, and Wollheim himself.

Wollheim had planned a second issue, and the first issue announced future stories by Ralph Milne Farley, Robert Bloch, and J. Harvey Haggard, but the expense, and Shepard's loss of interest in the project, meant that no more issues appeared.

== Bibliographic details ==
The publishers were Donald Wollheim and Wilson Shepherd; Shepherd printed the magazine in Oakman, Alabama, and Wollheim was the editor. The magazine was in digest format, 48 pages, and was priced at 20 cents. There was only one issue, dated Fall 1936.

== Sources ==
- Ashley, Mike (2000). The Time Machines: The Story of the Science-Fiction Pulp Magazines from the beginning to 1950. Liverpool: Liverpool University Press. ISBN 0-85323-865-0.
- DeVore, Howard (1985). "Fanciful Tales of Time and Space". In Tymn, Marshall B.; Ashley, Mike (eds.). Science Fiction, Fantasy and Weird Fiction Magazines. Westport, Connecticut: Greenwood Press. pp. 219–221. ISBN 0-3132-1221-X.
