= Autobiography: Some Notes on a Nonentity =

Essay by Howard Phillips Lovecraft

- Cover of Autobiography: Some Notes on a Nonentity
- Author: H. P. Lovecraft
- Language: English
- Genre: Biography
- Publisher: Arkham House
- Publication date: 1963
- Publication place: United States
- Media type: Print (Paperback)
- Pages: 17 pp

Autobiography: Some Notes on a Nonentity is an autobiographical essay by American author H. P. Lovecraft. It was released in 1963 by Arkham House in an edition of 500 copies. The essay was originally included in Beyond the Wall of Sleep. This reprinting includes annotations by August Derleth. More recently it has been reprinted in the books Lord of a Visible World: An Autobiography in Letters edited by S. T. Joshi and David E. Schultz (2000), and Collected Essays, Volume 5: Philosophy; Autobiography & Miscellany edited by S. T. Joshi (2006).
