= The Shuttered Room =

1967 British film by David Greene

- Theatrical release poster
- Directed by: David Greene
- Written by: D. B. Ledrov; Nathaniel Tanchuck
- Based on: "The Shuttered Room" (1959 story) by August Derleth; H. P. Lovecraft
- Produced by: Philip Hazelton
- Starring: Gig Young; Carol Lynley; Oliver Reed; Flora Robson
- Cinematography: Kenneth Hodges
- Edited by: Brian Smedley-Aston
- Music by: Basil Kirchin
- Production companies: Troy-Schenck Productions; Seven Arts Productions
- Distributed by: Warner-Pathé Distributors (UK); Warner Bros.-Seven Arts (worldwide)
- Release date: 27 June 1967 (UK)
- Running time: 100 minutes
- Country: United Kingdom
- Language: English

The Shuttered Room (also known as Blood Island) is a 1967 British horror film directed by David Greene in his feature directorial debut, starring Gig Young, Carol Lynley, Oliver Reed and Flora Robson. It is based on the 1959 short story by August Derleth, published as a so-called "posthumous collaboration" with H. P. Lovecraft. The film was released in the UK by Warner-Pathé Distributors on June 27, 1967.

== Plot ==
Susannah Kelton, a newly married woman who was raised in foster care in the city, learns that her real parents have died and left their property to her. She and her husband Mike travel to the island of Dunwich off the coast of Massachusetts to inspect the property. They find a local culture that is clannish, backward and ignorant. The few friends whom they make among the locals, including Susannah's aunt Agatha, warn them that the family mill is cursed and urge the Keltons to leave immediately and never look back.

Refusing to bow to superstition, the couple consider rebuilding the abandoned mill. They become the target of a gang of local thugs led by Susannah's lecherous cousin, Ethan. Their reign of terror is ended by something still living in the shuttered attic room of the mill, something that caused Susannah to have nightmares as a child.

== Cast ==
- Gig Young as Mike Kelton
- Carol Lynley as Susannah Whately Kelton / Sarah
  - Anita Anderson as young Susannah
- Oliver Reed as Ethan
- Flora Robson as Aunt Agatha
- Judith Arthy as Emma
- Rick Jones as Luther Whately
- Ann Bell as Mary Whately
- William Devlin as Zebulon Whately
  - Donald Sutherland as Zebulon Whately (voice; uncredited)
- Charles Lloyd-Pack as Barge Master
- Bernard Kay as Tait
- Celia Hewitt as Aunt Sarah
- Robert Cawdron as Luther Whately
- Murray Evans, Clifford Diggins, and Peter Porteous as Gang Members

== Production ==
Ken Russell was originally attached to direct the film, but was replaced shortly before filming started. Television director David Greene made his feature film debut. The cast discovered the director had been replaced the day before the shooting started. On his first day, Greene instructed the cast to ignore the script and "make this up as we go along", with each actor being responsible for their own dialogue.

Filming began in April 1966. During the filming, Carol Lynley and Oliver Reed briefly became romantically involved. Although set in the U.S., the film was shot in England. Hollowshore Boatyard and The Shipwright's Arms in Faversham, Kent feature throughout the film, doubling as the town of Dunwich, Massachusetts. South Foreland Lighthouse in Dover also features as the exterior of Aunt Agatha's home. The film features a large half-brick, half-timber watermill, which is destroyed by fire in the closing scenes. The building used was Hardingham Mill on the River Yare in Norfolk.

Gig Young accepted the role at a reduced salary in exchange for 5% of the profits over $1 million.

William Devlin's lines were redubbed by an uncredited Donald Sutherland.

== Release ==
The film was delayed by the merger between Seven Arts Productions and Warner Bros., remaining unreleased for months while the companies negotiated an agreement; it was eventually released in the UK in summer 1967, followed by a U.S. release in early 1968. In some theaters, it was shown as part of a double bill with Jeremy Summers' The Vengeance of Fu Manchu.

== Reception ==
=== Critical response ===
The Monthly Film Bulletin wrote:

Television director David Greene brings enough style to this thriller to suggest that, given a better script, he might produce something really interesting. Particularly striking is the way he uses his camera to suggest the mysterious presence behind the door of the shuttered room. The imaginative opening sequence, with a subjective camera retreating in front of an unseen attacker, creates an atmosphere of tangible but undefined terror. And having established an atmosphere right from the beginning, the film sustains it, watching the visitors as they arrive at the mill from behind its darkened windows, picking up details of a barely remembered childhood (like the cobwebbed abacus, or the battered teddy-bear), and even managing to suggest that the huge, gleaming car is as much an intruder on the island as the visitors themselves. It is a pity that neither the script nor the performances match the film's visual imagination – though Flora Robson is splendid as Aunt Agatha, mistress of the island and keeper of its secret, first seen at the top of her tower, bedraggled, hair streaked with grey, and with a wild-looking bird for company as she looks out over her domain.

The Radio Times Guide to Films gave the film 3/5 stars, writing: "This superior tale of the supernatural was based on a short story by August Derleth and H.P. Lovecraft. Twenty years after she was driven away from her childhood home by a series of sinister happenings, Carol Lynley returns with her new husband, Gig Young. But the old mill is as daunting as ever and deliriously malevolent cousin Oliver Reed and his gang of New England delinquents are far from the ideal welcoming committee. David Greene leaks the secret of the room at the top of the stairs early on, but he still conveys a sense of evil."

Leslie Halliwell said: "Stretched out suspenser which looks good and is carefully made but fails in its effort to combine the menace of teenage yobboes with that of the monster lurking upstairs."

Several critics noted similarities to Sam Peckinpah's Straw Dogs (1971).
