= To Quebec and the Stars =

Collection of essays by Howard Phillips Lovecraft

- Dust-jacket for To Quebec and the Stars
- Author: H. P. Lovecraft
- Cover artist: Robert MacIntyre
- Language: English
- Subject: Essays
- Publisher: Donald M. Grant, Publisher, Inc.
- Publication date: 1976
- Publication place: United States
- Media type: Print (Hardback)
- Pages: 318 pp
- ISBN: 0-937986-30-5

To Quebec and the Stars is a collection of seventeen essays written by H. P. Lovecraft, assembled and edited by L. Sprague de Camp, who came across them in the course of his research for his biography of Lovecraft. The collection was first published in hardcover by Donald M. Grant, Publisher, Inc. in 1976.

== Summary ==
The essays collected in the book cover a variety of subjects, notably astronomy, poetry, literature and travel; the main piece is a travelogue to Quebec, published for the first time in this collection.

== Essays ==
- "Trans-Neptunian Planets"
- "November Skies"
- "June Skies"
- "May Skies"
- "The Truth About Mars"
- "Metrical Regularity"
- "Allowable Rhyme"
- "A Reminiscence of Dr. Samuel Johnson"
- "The Literature of Rome"
- "What Belongs in Verse"
- "The Crime of the Century"
- "Nietzscheism and Realism"
- "A Confession of Unfaith"
- "A Descent to Avernus"
- "Some Dutch Footprints in New England"
- "The Unknown City in the Ocean"
- "A Description of the Town of Quebec"

== Reception ==
Richard A. Lupoff praised the collection as "an absolute treasure trove," singling out the title piece as "a delight to read ... like taking a guided tour of the city in the company of a knowledgeable and garrulous friend whose greatest delight is to share with you his own pleasure in the city and its past."

== Notes ==
- Chalker, Jack L.; Mark Owings (1998). The Science-Fantasy Publishers: A Bibliographic History, 1923–1998. Westminster, MD and Baltimore: Mirage Press, Ltd. p. 323.
