= Batman: The Doom That Came to Gotham =

2000–2001 DC comic book miniseries

- Cover of issue #1

Publication information
- Publisher: DC Comics
- Schedule: Monthly
- Format: Limited series
- Publication date: November 2000 – January 2001
- No. of issues: 3
- Main character(s): Batman; Ra's al Ghul

Creative team
- Written by: Mike Mignola; Richard Pace
- Penciller: Troy Nixey
- Inker: Dennis Janke
- Colorist: Dave Stewart

Batman: The Doom That Came to Gotham is an American three-issue comic book miniseries published from November 2000 to January 2001 under DC Comics' Elseworlds imprint. Written by Mike Mignola and Richard Pace and illustrated by Troy Nixey (pencils) and Dennis Janke (inks), with Mignola providing covers, the story deals with an alternate Batman in the 1920s fighting against mystical and supernatural forces that are taking Gotham by storm after he accidentally reawakens the being known as the Lurker on the Threshold. The comic was loosely adapted into an an animated film with the same name in 2023.

Mignola's third work for the character, the story is full of many Lovecraft-inspired renditions of both the Dark Knight's friends and foes, including Green Arrow, Etrigan, Two-Face, Ra's al Ghul, and so on. In addition, the story's title is an allusion to Lovecraft's "The Doom That Came to Sarnath". In 2015, the story was collected into one full volume by DC and published as a trade paperback.

== Plot ==
In the 1920s, Bruce Wayne travels abroad for twenty years following the murder of his parents in his search for answers behind the criminal mind. While investigating the disappearance of an expedition crew under Oswald Cobblepot, Bruce subdues an undead crewman named Grendon who was freeing an otherworldly creature encased in ice. Bruce's investigation in Cobblepot's journal expedites his return to Gotham City, which triggers a series of events where he learns a mystery that stretches back to the founding of Gotham and of a cult led by Ra's al Ghul seeking to unleash an ancient evil to usher in the end of the world. The logic-driven Batman, aided by Green Arrow, Etrigan, and James Gordon, battles these supernatural forces and ultimately sacrifices his humanity to save Gotham.

== In other media ==
An animated film Batman: The Doom That Came to Gotham based on the series was released in March 2023. It is the 51st film in the DC Universe Animated Original Movies line and stars David Giuntoli as the voice of Batman.
