= Sweet Ermengarde =

Short story by H. P. Lovecraft (c. 1920)

- Short story by H. P. Lovecraft
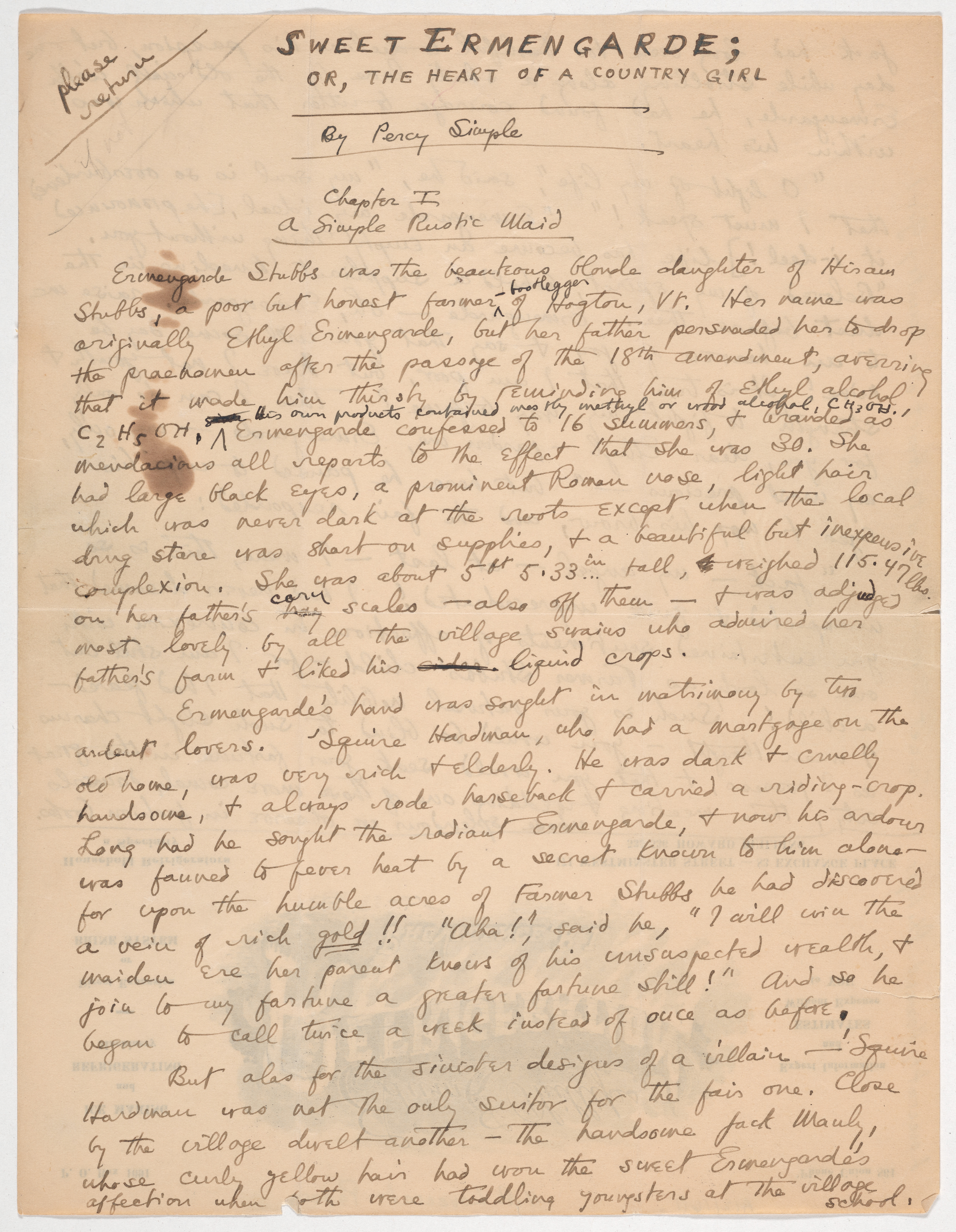
- Sweet Ermengarde

Text available at Wikisource
- Country: United States
- Language: English
- Genre: Parody short story

Publication
- Published in: Arkham House
- Publication date: 1943

"Sweet Ermengarde" is a short comic story by American horror fiction writer H. P. Lovecraft under the pseudonym "Percy Simple". As a comedy it is a curiosity of his early writing, and was probably written between 1919 and 1921; Lovecraft scholars state it is "the only work of fiction by HPL that cannot be dated with precision." It was first published in the Arkham House collection Beyond the Wall of Sleep (1943).

== Synopsis ==
The story is a parody of romantic melodrama, centering on Ethyl Ermengarde Stubbs and her relationships with villainous mortgage-holder 'Squire Hardman, would-be rescuer Jack Manly and fiancé Algernon Reginald Jones. An H. P. Lovecraft Encyclopedia suggests that a more precise target for Lovecraft's satire was writer Fred Jackson, whose novels often "have exactly the sort of implausibility of plot and sentimentality of action that is parodied in 'Sweet Ermengarde'."

== Reception ==
An H. P. Lovecraft Encyclopedia describes the story (with 'A Reminiscence of Dr. Samuel Johnson' and 'Ibid') as one of a trilogy of Lovecraft's "comic gems".
