= The Lurker at the Threshold =

Novel by August Derleth and H. P. Lovecraft

- Dust jacket illustration by Ronald Clyne for The Lurker at the Threshold
- Author: August Derleth (inspired by fragments by H.P. Lovecraft)
- Cover artist: Ronald Clyne
- Language: English
- Genre: Horror
- Publisher: Arkham House
- Publication date: 1945
- Publication place: United States
- Media type: Print (Hardback)
- Pages: 196

The Lurker at the Threshold is a horror novel by American writer August Derleth, based on short fragments written by H. P. Lovecraft, who died in 1937, and published as a collaboration between the two authors. According to S. T. Joshi, of the novel's 50,000 words, 1,200 were written by Lovecraft.

The novel was originally published in 1945 by Arkham House in a hardcover edition of 3,041 copies, listed as the second (and final) volume in the "Library of Arkham House Novels of Fantasy and Terror". A British hardcover followed from Museum Press in 1948. The first British paperback was issued in 1970, with an American paperback published by Beagle Books in 1971. The novel has since been regularly reissued by Ballantine Books, then by Carroll & Graf. A French translation, Le rôdeur devant le seuil, appeared in 1973.

The Lurker at the Threshold was included in The Watchers Out of Time and Others, the 1974 Arkham House omnibus edition of Derleth's stories credited as collaborations with Lovecraft (but excluded from similarly titled paperback editions compiling those stories).

== Plot ==
The Lurker at the Threshold is divided into three sections. "Billington's Wood" focuses on Ambrose Dewart, an Englishman who reclaims an ancestral property near Arkham, Massachusetts, and learns the disquieting history of his ancestors, Richard and Alijah Billington. Disregarding the latter's posthumous warning, he removes a stone from a round tower on the Billington property, and thus unleashes eldritch forces.

The second section, "Manuscript by Stephen Bates," is presented as an account by Dewart's cousin, Stephen Bates, who comes to realize that Dewart is under a malignant influence.

The third section and conclusion, "Narrative of Winfield Phillips," describes the actions of Miskatonic University librarian Seneca Lapham to deal with the evil unleashed by Dewart--written from the perspective of Lapham's assistant, Winfield Phillips.

== Composition ==
"I constructed and wrote The Lurker at the Threshold," Derleth acknowledged, "which had nowhere been laid out, planned, or plotted by Lovecraft." He elsewhere described the novel as "decidedly inferior work, since 9/10ths of it was written by me from Lovecraft’s notes".

Derleth reported using two Lovecraft fragments in writing the novel. S. T. Joshi, however, finds that while Derleth incorporated text from two Lovecraft fragments into the novel, "Of Evill Sorceries Done in New-England of Daemons in no Humane Shape" and "The Round Tower", he also used an untitled fragment, usually referred to as "The Rose Window", in framing his narrative. Derleth cited only the "Tower" and "Window" fragments in his account of his writing Lurker, although he drew on "Evill Sorceries" much more extensively, changing the date of the events described from 1684 to 1788.

== Reception ==
E. F. Bleiler rated the novel as the best of Derleth's Lovecraft pastiches, but felt that "[t]he New England background is not convincing, and the Lovecraft manner is not captured successfully". Baird Searles reviewed Lurker favorably: although Derleth makes modern references that Lovecraft avoided, "the novel's atmosphere is still wonderfully sinister". Joshi wrote that Lurker "begins well, but it rapidly deteriorates into a naive good-versus-evil struggle between the Old Ones and the Elder Gods".

== Characters ==
=== Richard Billington ===
The first Billington to lay claim to Billington's Wood. According to the book Of Evill Sorceries Done in New-England of Daemons in No Humane Shape, in the early years of the Plymouth Colony, during the governorship of William Bradford (1621–1657), Billington set up "a great Ring of Stones" where he said "Prayers to ye Devil" and "sung certain Rites of Magick abominable by Scripture". After a series of mysterious deaths were linked to him, he disappeared, and was said by the Wampanaug Indians to have been "eat up by what he had call'd out of ye Sky."

=== Misquamacus ===
An "ancient Wonder-Worker" of the Wampanaug tribe. According to the fictional book Of Evill Sorceries Done in New-England of Daemons in No Humane Shape, Misquamacus teaches "Sorceries" to Richard Billington and imprisons Ossadagowah, a spawn of Tsathoggua, in a ring of stones. The same character (presumably) later reappears in the early 19th century as Quamis, a servant of Alijah Billington and the guardian of his son Laban. Quamis, described as a Narragansett Indian, is a worshipper of Nyarlathotep. The change of the character from helpful to harmful is never explained.

The character Misquamacus is also the villain of the 1976 novel The Manitou (which was made into a film of the same name starring Tony Curtis, Susan Strasberg, Burgess Meredith and Michael Ansara in 1978), the 1979 novel Revenge of the Manitou, the 1993 novel Burial, the 1996 short story "Spirit Jump", the 2005 novel Manitou Blood, the 2009 novel Blind Panic and the 2015 novel Plague of the Manitou, all written by Graham Masterton.

=== Alijah Billington ===
Billington inherits Richard Billington's estate in the early 19th century. He enters into a rivalry with Reverend Ward Phillips, who accused Billington and his forebear of practicing sorcery. The feud culminated with the disappearance of John Druven, one of Phillips' supporters. Afterwards, Billington leaves for England with his son Laban and his servant Quamis, remaining there until his death.

=== Ward Phillips ===
Reverend of the Second Church (later First Baptist Church) of Arkham. In 1805, he became the librarian at Miskatonic University. He is chiefly known for his book Thaumaturgical Prodigies in the New-English Canaan. When Alijah Billington found out that the book accused his ancestor of practicing sorcery, he started a feud with Phillips, which lasted several months. Shortly after one of his proponents, John Druven, disappeared, Phillips seemingly had a change of heart and began buying and burning every copy of his book that he could lay his hands on.

The name is an homage to Howard Phillips Lovecraft. A character of the same name appears in Lovecraft's "Through the Gates of the Silver Key".

=== John Druven ===
An occasional correspondent for the Arkham Gazette and a friend of Ward Phillips. He disappeared after accepting an invitation from Alijah Billington to investigate strange noises emanating from Billington's Wood.

=== Ambrose Dewart ===
(approximately 1870–1924)

A descendant of Laban Billington who comes to Arkham in 1921 to reclaim his family's property which had been abandoned for roughly a century. He is described as "a hawk-faced man of medium height, chiefly distinguished for a flare of red hair which gave him a tonsured appearance, keen of eye and tight of lip, exceedingly correct and possessed of a dry sort of humor... a man of some fifty years of age, brown-skinned, who had lost his only son in the great war."

Locals blame him for a subsequent series of unexplainable disappearances in the area. He disappeared in 1924.

=== Stephen Bates ===
(perhaps 1875–1924)

A cousin of Ambrose Deward who lives in Boston and whom Ambrose summons to assist him, fearing something is happening that he will not be able to control. Seeing that his cousin's fears were realized, he sought help with professor Lapham below, but disappeared soon after.

=== Seneca Lapham ===
A professor of anthropology at Miskatonic University and a graduate of the same institution (class of 1879). He investigated the events of Billington's Wood and procured several of the family's books for the University library. He also appears in Lin Carter's "The Horror in the Gallery".

== References in popular culture ==
The book is referenced as the name of the four-part "Lurker At The Threshold" suite by avant-garde musician Buckethead on his album The Elephant Man's Alarm Clock (2006).

The title of the book is seen written on the chalkboard behind high school teacher Jake Amberson as a reading assignment in a scene from the first episode of the filmed adaptation of Stephen King's novel 11/22/1963. King is a lifelong fan of Lovecraft and has himself written stories considered to be influenced by the Cthulhu Mythos.

The being known as the Lurker on the Threshold appeared in the three-issue comic book miniseries Batman: The Doom That Came to Gotham, which was published from November 2000 to January 2001. An animated film adaptation of the comic was released in 2023.

== Sources ==
- Jaffery, Sheldon (1989). The Arkham House Companion. Mercer Island, WA: Starmont House, Inc. pp. 14–15. ISBN 1-55742-005-X.
- Chalker, Jack L.; Mark Owings (1998). The Science-Fantasy Publishers: A Bibliographic History, 1923-1998. Westminster, MD and Baltimore: Mirage Press, Ltd. p. 28.
- Joshi, S.T. (1999). Sixty Years of Arkham House: A History and Bibliography. Sauk City, WI: Arkham House. p. 32. ISBN 0-87054-176-5.
- Nielsen, Leon (2004). Arkham House Books: A Collector's Guide. Jefferson, NC and London: McFarland & Company, Inc. p. 56. ISBN 0-7864-1785-4.
