= The Conservative =

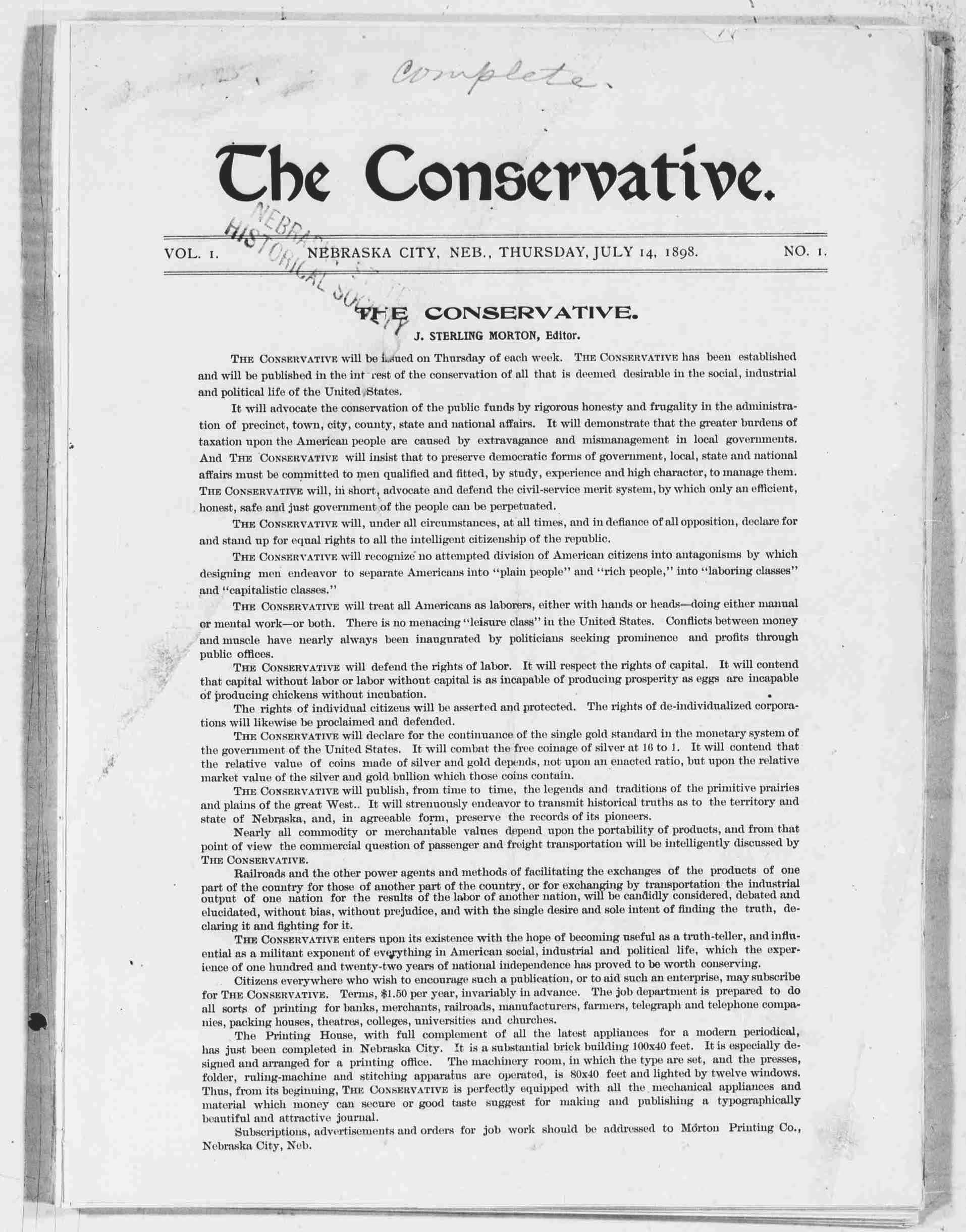
Front page of the first issue of The Conservative, July 14, 1898

The Conservative was a weekly newspaper devoted to the discussion of political, economic, and sociological questions published in Nebraska City, Nebraska, by Julius Sterling Morton.

== History ==
The Conservative was first issued on July 14, 1898 by the Morton Printing Company. The publication was not dedicated to news but acted as a journal of political discussion. During the last two years of publishing, Morton would use The Conservative as a forum through which to disagree and criticize his rival Nebraska Democrat William Jennings Bryan and his publication, The Commoner. In the first issue of The Conservative, the letter from the editor stated that the paper would be a defender of the individual and critical of big government. In addition, the paper also served as a platform for Morton to campaign for the formation of a third Conservative Party, which he believed was necessary to realign the environment of American politics.

Issued every Thursday The Conservative was printed in a magazine-style three-column format that ranged from ten to twenty printed pages per issue. Although the paper was published for only four years, The Conservative included many notable contributors like Robert W. Furnas, Carl Shurz and Dr. George L. Miller.

Morton remained at the helm of the paper until poor health forced him to turn over editorship to his son, Paul Morton, on April 24, 1902. The last issue of The Conservative was published on May 29, 1902 and consisted mainly of tributes to the deceased Julius Sterling Morton.
