= C/1913 Y1 (Delavan) =

Non-periodic comet

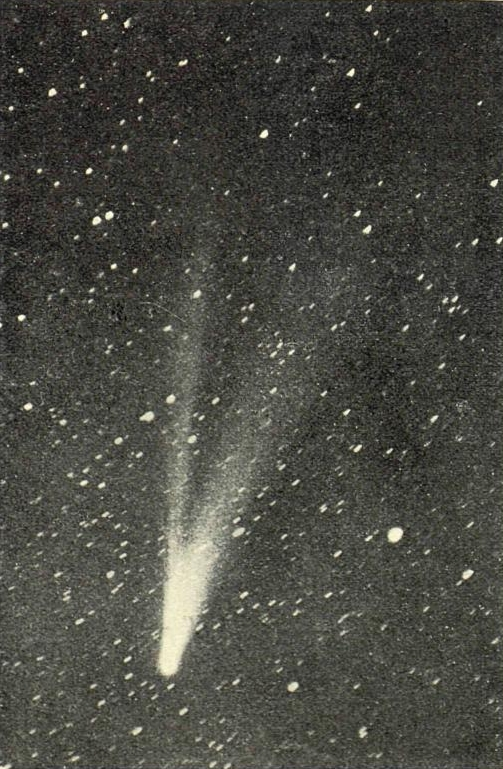
- Comet Delavan photographed by Gavril A. Tikhov from the Pulkovo Observatory in October 1914

Discovery
- Discovered by: Paul T. Delavan (Note: Referred to as "Pablo" only while working in Argentina)
- Discovery site: La Plata Observatory
- Discovery date: 18 December 1913

Designations
- Alternative designations: 1914 V, 1913f

Orbital characteristics
- Epoch: 15 March 1914 (JD 2420206.5)
- Observation arc: 628 days (1.72 years)
- Number of observations: 1,006
- Perihelion: 1.1044 AU
- Eccentricity: 1.00014
- Inclination: 68.043°
- Longitude of ascending node: 60.397°
- Argument of periapsis: 287.436°
- Last perihelion: 26 October 1914
- Earth MOID: 0.63832 AU
- Jupiter MOID: 1.64685 AU

Physical characteristics
- Mean radius: 1.89 km (1.17 mi) (Note: Calculated mean radius using the formula: $\log_{10}\,(\,R\,)\ =\;0.9 +\;0.13 (\,H\,)$ Where $\,H\,$ is the comet's absolute total magnitude (M1))
- Comet total magnitude (M1): 4.8
- Apparent magnitude: 1.1 (1914 apparition)

Comet Delavan, formally designated as C/1913 Y1, is a non-periodic comet discovered by astronomer Paul T. Delavan from the La Plata Observatory in Argentina on 18 December 1913.

The comet was last seen on 19 September 1915. It is one of 19 comets used in the original sample by Jan Oort for his hypothesis regarding the origin of long-period comets in 1950.
