= The Alchemist (short story) =

1908 short story by H.P. Lovecraft

- Short story by H. P. Lovecraft

Text available at Wikisource
- Country: United States
- Language: English
- Genre: Fantasy short story

Publication
- Published in: United Amateur
- Publication date: November 1916

"The Alchemist" is a short story by American writer H. P. Lovecraft. It was written in 1908, when Lovecraft was 17 or 18, and first published in the November 1916 issue of the United Amateur.

== Plot ==
The story is a first person account narrated by Count Antoine de C. Hundreds of years ago, Antoine's noble ancestor was responsible for the death of a dark wizard, Michel Mauvais. The wizard's son, Charles le Sorcier, swore revenge on not only him but all his descendants, cursing them to die upon reaching the age of 32.

Count Antoine recounts how his ancestors all died in some mysterious way around the age of 32. The line has dwindled and the castle has been left to fall into disrepair, tower by tower. Antoine is the only one left, with one poor servant, Pierre, who raised him. Only a tiny section of the castle is still usable. Antoine has reached adulthood, and his 32nd year is approaching.

His servant eventually dies, leaving Antoine completely alone. In his isolation, he begins exploring the ruined parts of the castle. He finds a trapdoor in one of the oldest parts. Below, he discovers a passage with a locked door at the end. Just as he turns to leave, he hears a noise behind him and sees that the door is open and someone is standing in it. The man attempts to kill him and a fight ensues, ending with Antoine killing the stranger. The man's last words reveal that he is none other than Charles, who actually managed to successfully fabricate the elixir of life, enabling him to personally fulfill the curse generation after generation.

== Adaptations ==
- A graphic novel adaptation written by Steven Philip Jones and drawn by Octavio Cariello was originally published in 1991 by Malibu Graphics. It was reprinted in an individual graphic novel in 2016 by Caliber Comics and is part of Caliber's H. P. Lovecraft Worlds anthology series.
- The story is retold from the point of view of Charles le Sorcier in the Blue Öyster Cult song "The Alchemist."
