= The Survivor and Others =

1957 collection of short stories by August Derleth

- Dust jacket illustration by Ronald Clyne.
- Author: August Derleth (inspired by notes by H.P. Lovecraft)
- Cover artist: Ronald Clyne
- Language: English
- Genre: Fantasy, Horror
- Publisher: Arkham House
- Publication date: 1957
- Publication place: United States
- Media type: Print (hardback)
- Pages: 161

The Survivor and Others is a collection of fantasy and horror short stories by American writer August Derleth. It was released in an edition of 2,096 copies. It was reissued in paperback by Ballantine Books in 1962 and 1971. The stories were based on and inspired by unused ideas of H. P. Lovecraft, and billed as "posthumous collaborations" with him. Derleth was in fact Lovecraft's literary executor after the latter's death in 1937.

== Contents ==
- "The Survivor"
- "Wentworth's Day"
- "The Peabody Heritage"
- "The Gable Window"
- "The Ancestor"
- "The Shadow Out of Space"
- "The Lamp of Alhazred"

Except as noted, the stories were original to this volume. "The Survivor" had been published originally in the July 1954 issue of Weird Tales. "The Gable Window" had appeared in the May 1957 issue of the science fiction/fantasy pulp Saturn under the title of "The Murky Glass".

== Reception ==
Anthony Boucher noted wryly that "I can't help feeling that H.P.L. knew very well what he was doing when he left the outlines uncompleted,"with the exception of "The Lamp of Alhazred," in which, according to him, "with a flash of inspiration" Derleth introduced Lovecraft as a character and produced "a warmly moving tribute." Floyd C. Gale of Galaxy Science Fiction said that except for "The Shadow Out of Space" "Derleth generates unintended humor in most of his reconstructions", and that "Alhazred" "might aptly have been titled 'Eulogy' ... an idealized version of what Lovecraft's life and death should have been". Avram Davidson concluded that Derleth "does his best to conjure up the late master's prose from its essential salts, but he doesn't make it [...] because he is as sane as they come, and Lovecraft was as nutty as a five-dollar fruitcake."

Everett F. Bleiler, noting that several of these pastiches were modeled on published Lovecraft stories, found all were "routine" except the "much more interesting 'The Lamp of Alhazred'".

== Sources ==
- Jaffery, Sheldon (1989). The Arkham House Companion. Mercer Island, WA: Starmont House, Inc. pp. 45–46. ISBN 1-55742-005-X.
- Chalker, Jack L.; Mark Owings (1998). The Science-Fantasy Publishers: A Bibliographic History, 1923-1998. Westminster, MD and Baltimore: Mirage Press, Ltd. p. 35.
- Joshi, S.T. (1999). Sixty Years of Arkham House: A History and Bibliography. Sauk City, WI: Arkham House. p. 60. ISBN 0-87054-176-5.
- Nielsen, Leon (2004). Arkham House Books: A Collector's Guide. Jefferson, NC and London: McFarland & Company, Inc. p. 76. ISBN 0-7864-1785-4.
