= The Very Old Folk =

1927 story by H. P. Lovecraft

- Short story by H. P. Lovecraft

Text available at Wikisource
- Country: United States
- Language: English
- Genre: Horror short story

Publication
- Published in: The Horror from the Hills
- Media type: Print (Novella)
- Publication date: 1968

"The Very Old Folk" is the name given by publishers to a story found in the letter sent to Donald Wandrei by American horror fiction writer H. P. Lovecraft on 3 November 1927. Author Frank Belknap Long read this dream too, and asked Lovecraft permission to include it in a piece of his own fiction, which Lovecraft approved, and it is part of the novella The Horror from the Hills.

== Story ==
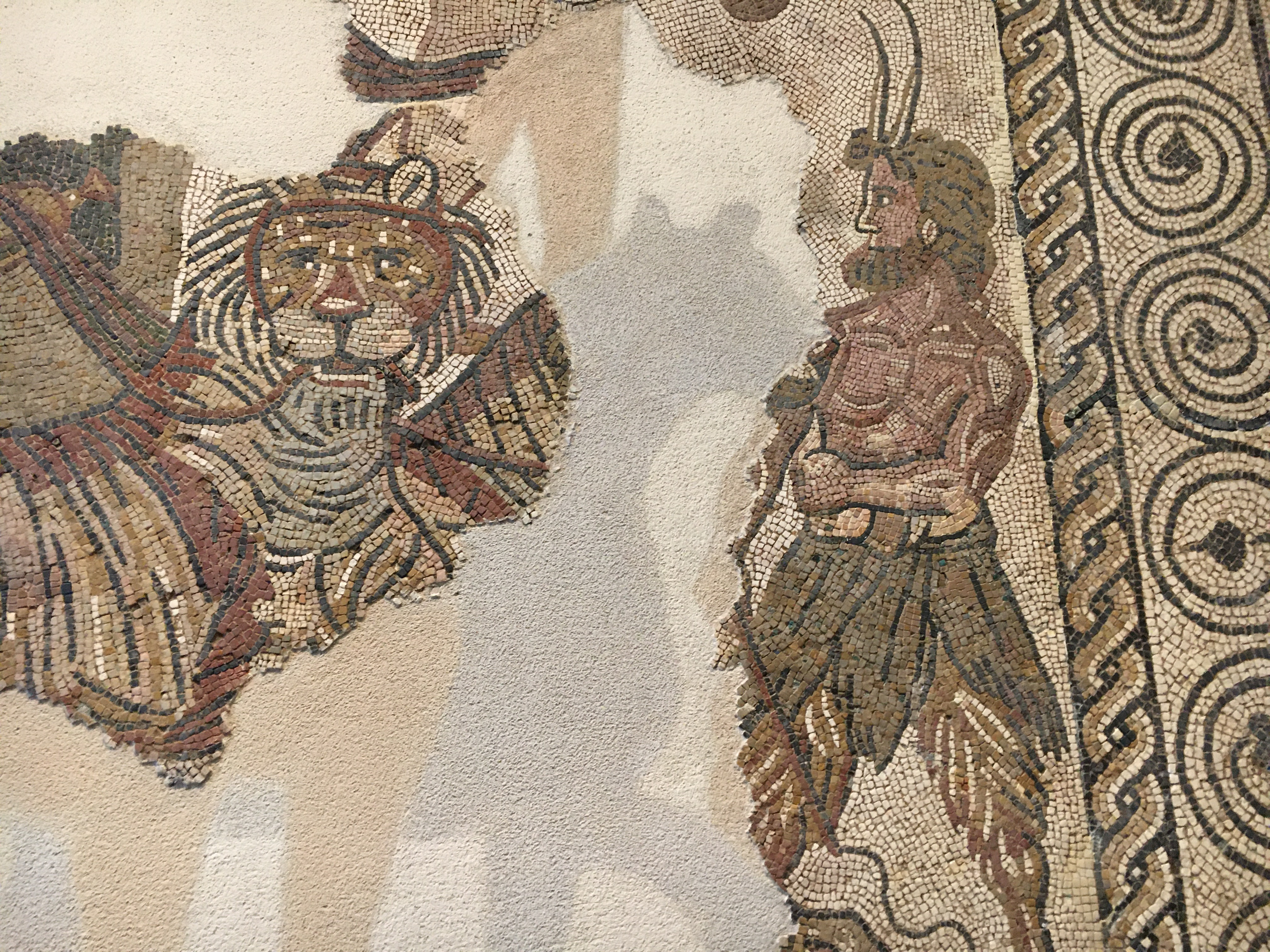
Mosaic from Roman Pamplona, depicting the "Triumph of Bacchus."

It is a recording of a dream, where the protagonist is a Roman military official in the Vascon country near Pompelo. The countryside is, every year, ravaged by terrible hill people who kidnap citizens and perform cruel rituals at a Sabbath. The narrator wishes to lead a military expedition to crush these hill folk, as a feeling of approaching evil has enveloped the countryside, due to a riot between the citizens and the hill people. These hill folk came to trade, yet some of these are killed and later, no disappearances occur before the time of the Sabbath. The incursion is guided by a local-born son of Roman parents. As the Romans approach the seat of the Sabbath rituals, something terrible attacks them and in an instant, horrible things come to pass:

He had killed himself when the horses screamed... He, who had been born and lived all his life in that region, and knew what men whispered about the hills. All the torches now began to dim, and the cries of frightened legionaries mingled with the unceasing screams of the tethered horses. The air grew perceptibly colder, more suddenly so than is usual at November's brink, and seemed stirred by terrible undulations which I could not help connecting with the beating of huge wings.

The story ends with the narrator waking up and claiming that "it was the most vivid dream in years, drawing upon wells of the subconscious long untouched and forgotten."
