= The Street (short story) =

1919 short story by H. P. Lovecraft

- Short story by H. P. Lovecraft

Text available at Wikisource
- Country: United States
- Language: English
- Genre: Horror short story

Publication
- Published in: Wolverine
- Publication date: 1920

"The Street" is a short story by American horror fiction writer H. P. Lovecraft, written in late 1919 and first published in the December 1920 issue of the Wolverine amateur journal.

== Plot ==
The story traces the history of the titular street in a New England city from its first beginnings as "but a path" in colonial times to a quasi-supernatural occurrence in the years immediately following World War I. As the city grows up around the street, it is planted with many trees and built along with "simple, beautiful houses of brick and wood", each with a rose garden. As the Industrial Revolution runs its course, the area degenerates into a run-down and polluted slum, with all of the street's old houses falling into disrepair.

After World War I and the October Revolution, the area becomes home to a community of Russian immigrants. Among the new residents is the leadership of a "vast band of terrorists," who are plotting the destruction of the United States on Independence Day. When the day arrives, the terrorists gather to do the deed, but before they can get started, all the houses in the street collapse concurrently on top of each other, killing them all. Observers at the scene testify that immediately after the collapse, they experienced visions of the trees and rose gardens that had once been in the street.

== Inspiration ==
The Boston Police Strike of September–October 1919 inspired Lovecraft to write "The Street," as he declared in a letter to Frank Belknap Long:

The Boston police mutiny of last year is what prompted that attempt—the magnitude and significance of such an act appalled me. Last fall it was grimly impressive to see Boston without bluecoats, and to watch the musket-bearing State Guardsmen patrolling the streets as though military occupation were in force. They went in pairs, determined-looking and khaki-clad, as if symbols of the strife that lies ahead in civilisation's struggle with the monster of unrest and bolshevism.

The terrorism was also real, and had been going on since 1914 in a series of parcel bombs. In 1919 two campaigns of mail bombing were discovered. In 1920 there would be a major terrorist bomb attack on Wall Street. The (real and unreal) news of the anarchy occurring during the Russian and German revolutions would, along with the story of Peter the Painter, also have effected a market for the story.

The story's anti-immigrant stance echoes such earlier xenophobic poems by Lovecraft as "New England Fallen" and "On a New-England Village Seen by Moonlight."

== Reception ==
An H. P. Lovecraft Encyclopedia describes this story as "manifestly racist." According to Daniel Harms, author of The Encyclopedia Cthulhiana, "If someone came up to me and said, 'Hey Daniel, I think H. P. Lovecraft was a wordy, overly-sentimental bigot whose stories don't make much sense,' this would be the last story I would hand to him to convince him otherwise." S. T. Joshi called The Street "probably the single worst tale Lovecraft ever wrote".
