= The Nameless City =

1921 short story by H. P. Lovecraft

- Short story by H. P. Lovecraft
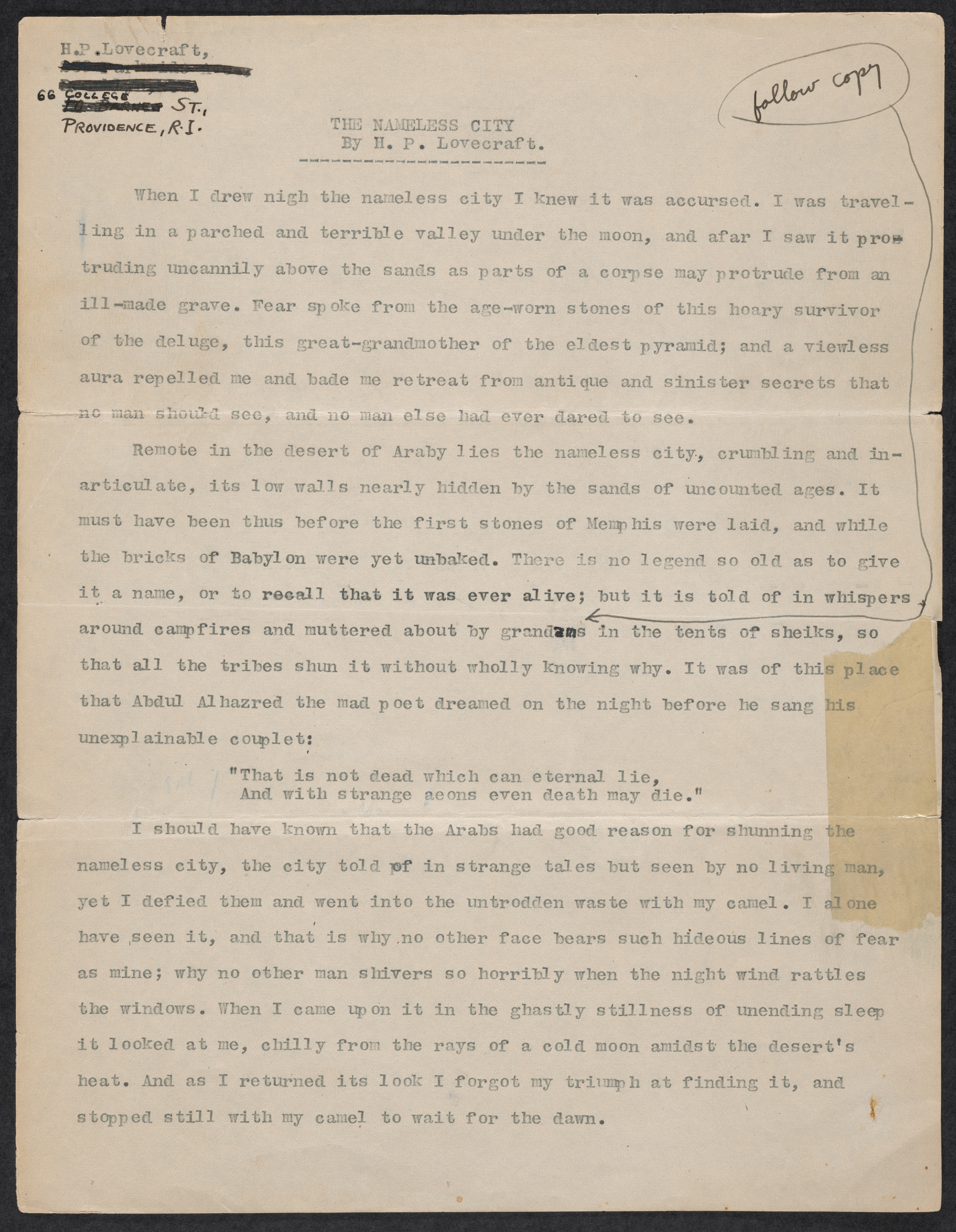
- Typescript

Text available at Wikisource
- Country: United States
- Language: English
- Genres: Horror, fantasy, adventure

Publication
- Published in: The Wolverine
- Publication date: November 1921

"The Nameless City" is a short horror story written by American writer H. P. Lovecraft in January 1921 and first published in the November 1921 issue of the amateur press journal The Wolverine. It is often considered the first story set in the Cthulhu Mythos world. In the story, the protagonist travels to the middle of the Arabian Desert to explore an ancient underground city.

Though Lovecraft himself was quite fond of the story, it was roundly rejected by a variety of magazines.

== Plot ==
The unnamed narrator of the story goes into the middle of the Arabian Peninsula to seek out and enter a lost city. After hearing a clanging seemingly coming from deep inside the earth, the narrator inspects mysterious carvings and ruins until nightfall. The next day, the narrator discovers a cliff riddled with low-ceilinged buildings, unfit for human use. While he attends to his suddenly nervous camel, the narrator discovers a somewhat larger temple, with altars, painted murals, and a small staircase going down. After he descends, his torch dies, and he crawls on his hands and knees until he enters a hallway with small wooden coffins containing bizarre reptiles inside of them lining the walls.

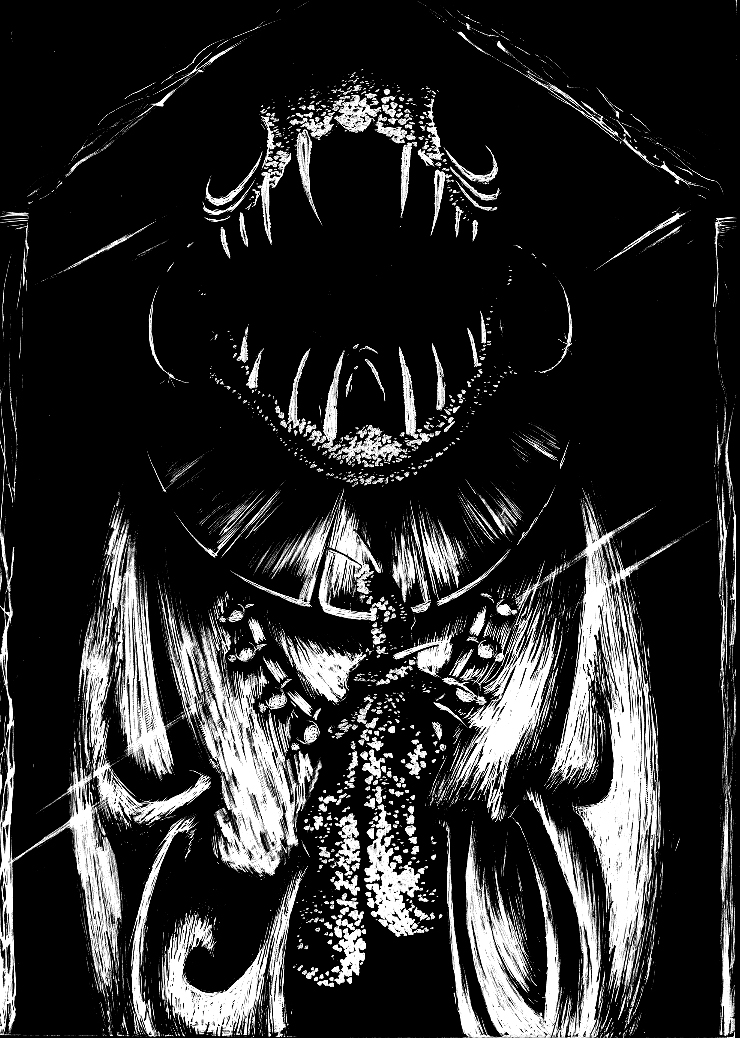
Artwork of the monstrous beings by Angela Sprecher

The narrator notices a large amount of light coming from an unknown source. After crawling to it on his hands and knees, he sees a large brass door with a descent into a misty portal. He then hears moaning coming from the coffin passage, and feels a strong wind coming from the passage, trying to pull him down. Against all odds, he resists, and sees what appear to be reptiles with a body shaped like a cross between a crocodile and a seal with a strange head common to neither of them, involving a protruding forehead, horns, lack of a nose, and an alligator-like jaw crawling behind the lit portal. The wind dies down after the last of it flows down into the light, when suddenly the door closes behind the narrator, leaving him in the dark.

== Inspiration ==
Lovecraft said that the story was based on a dream, which was in turn inspired by the last line of Lord Dunsany's story "The Probable Adventure of the Three Literary Men", quoted in the story itself: "the unreverberate blackness of the abyss".

Another identified source is the 9th Edition of the Encyclopædia Britannica, whose description of "Irem, the City of Pillars" he copied into his commonplace book: "which yet, after the annihilation of its tenants, remains entire, so Arabs say, invisible to ordinary eyes, but occasionally, and at rare intervals, revealed to some heaven-favoured traveller."

Critic William Fulwiler argues that Edgar Rice Burroughs' At the Earth's Core was one of Lovecraft's primary inspirations for "The Nameless City", citing "the reptile race, the tunnel to the interior of the earth, and the 'hidden world of eternal day'" as elements common to both tales. More generally, Fulwiler suggests, the theme of "alien races more powerful and more intelligent than man", which recurs frequently in Lovecraft's writings, may derive from Burroughs' Pellucidar stories. However, both writers drew on an already existing and vast literature of "lost city" stories and novels.

== Connections ==
The story contains the first mention of Abdul Alhazred, a fictional authority on the occult who would later be mentioned in most of Lovecraft's major Cthulhu Mythos stories, including "The Hound" (1922), "The Festival" (1923), "The Call of Cthulhu" (1926), The Case of Charles Dexter Ward (1927), "The Dunwich Horror" (1928), "The Whisperer in Darkness" (1930) At the Mountains of Madness (1931), "The Dreams in the Witch House" (1932), "The Thing on the Doorstep" (1933), and "The Shadow out of Time" (1934).

In "The Nameless City", Alhazred is not yet identified as the author of the famous Necronomicon, but the "unexplained couplet" that Lovecraft attributes to him is later established as coming from that work.

"The Nameless City" is an early example of Lovecraft's technique of mixing references from history, literature and his own fiction to create a persuasive background for his horrors. At one point, the narrator recalls:

To myself I pictured all the splendours of an age so distant that Chaldaea could not recall it, and thought of Sarnath the Doomed, that stood in the land of Mnar when mankind was young, and of Ib, that was carven of grey stone before mankind existed.

In this passage, Chaldaea is a historic region in Mesopotamia, whereas Sarnath, Mnar, and Ib are places in Lovecraft's story "The Doom that Came to Sarnath".

Later in the story, a single paragraph mentions Lovecraft's fictional Arab poet, an actual 5th century philosopher, a writer from the Middle Ages, a legendary Persian king, and one of Lovecraft's favorite fantasy authors:

In the darkness there flashed before my mind fragments of my cherished treasury of daemonic lore; sentences from Alhazred the mad Arab, paragraphs from the apocryphal nightmares of Damascius, and infamous lines from the delirious Image du Monde of Gautier de Metz. I repeated queer extracts, and muttered of Afrasiab and the daemons that floated with him down the Oxus; later chanting over and over again a phrase from one of Lord Dunsany's tales--"The unreverberate blackness of the abyss."

The paragraph goes on to quote the Irish poet Thomas Moore. The Colossi of Memnon are also mentioned.

== Reception ==
Though Lovecraft counted "The Nameless City" among his favorite stories, it was rejected (following its original amateur appearance) by a variety of professional outlets, including Weird Tales (twice), Fantasy Magazine and possibly The Galleon. It was accepted by The Fantasy Fan, which folded before publishing it. It eventually appeared in the fall 1936 issue of Fanciful Tales, published by Donald A. Wollheim and Wilson Shepherd, and was reprinted in the November 1938 issue of Weird Tales after Lovecraft's death.

Lin Carter described "The Nameless City" as "a trivial exercise in Poe-esque gothica", calling it "overwritten [and] over-dramatic". "[T]he mood of mounting horror is applied in a very artificial manner", Carter writes. "Rather than creating in the reader a mood of terror, Lovecraft describes a mood of terror: the emotion is applied in the adjectives." He does, however, allow that the tale has some "evocative power". Lovecraft himself was powerfully moved by an emotion of awe and fascination when contemplating the mysterious ruins of unthinkable antiquity. This emotion he manages to convey in a sort of dreamlike manner, despite his coldly clinical use of adjectives.

The story is often reprinted in various short story collections.

== Cultural references ==
The 1996 video game Quake, developed by id Software, includes a level titled “The Nameless City” in its fourth episode, The Elder World. Although the game is not a direct adaptation of Lovecraft's short story, the developers acknowledged drawing inspiration from Lovecraftian themes of ancient ruins, forbidden knowledge, and cosmic horror. One of the game's level designers, Sandy Petersen, who had previously created the role-playing game Call of Cthulhu, confirmed in an interview that “there are heaps of Lovecraft bits in the games … I was in on Quake from the start. The existence of Shamblers, Formless Spawn, and Shub-Niggurath speaks for itself.”

The level's design and atmosphere echo the story's depiction of a vast, desolate city older than human civilization, thereby linking Lovecraft's narrative legacy with the game's visual and thematic palette.

== Sources ==
- Lin Carter, Lovecraft: A Look Behind the Cthulhu Mythos.
- William Fulwiler, "E.R.B. and H.P.L.", Black Forbidden Things, Robert M. Price (ed.)
