= The Doom That Came to Sarnath =

1920 short story by H. P. Lovecraft

- Short story by H. P. Lovecraft
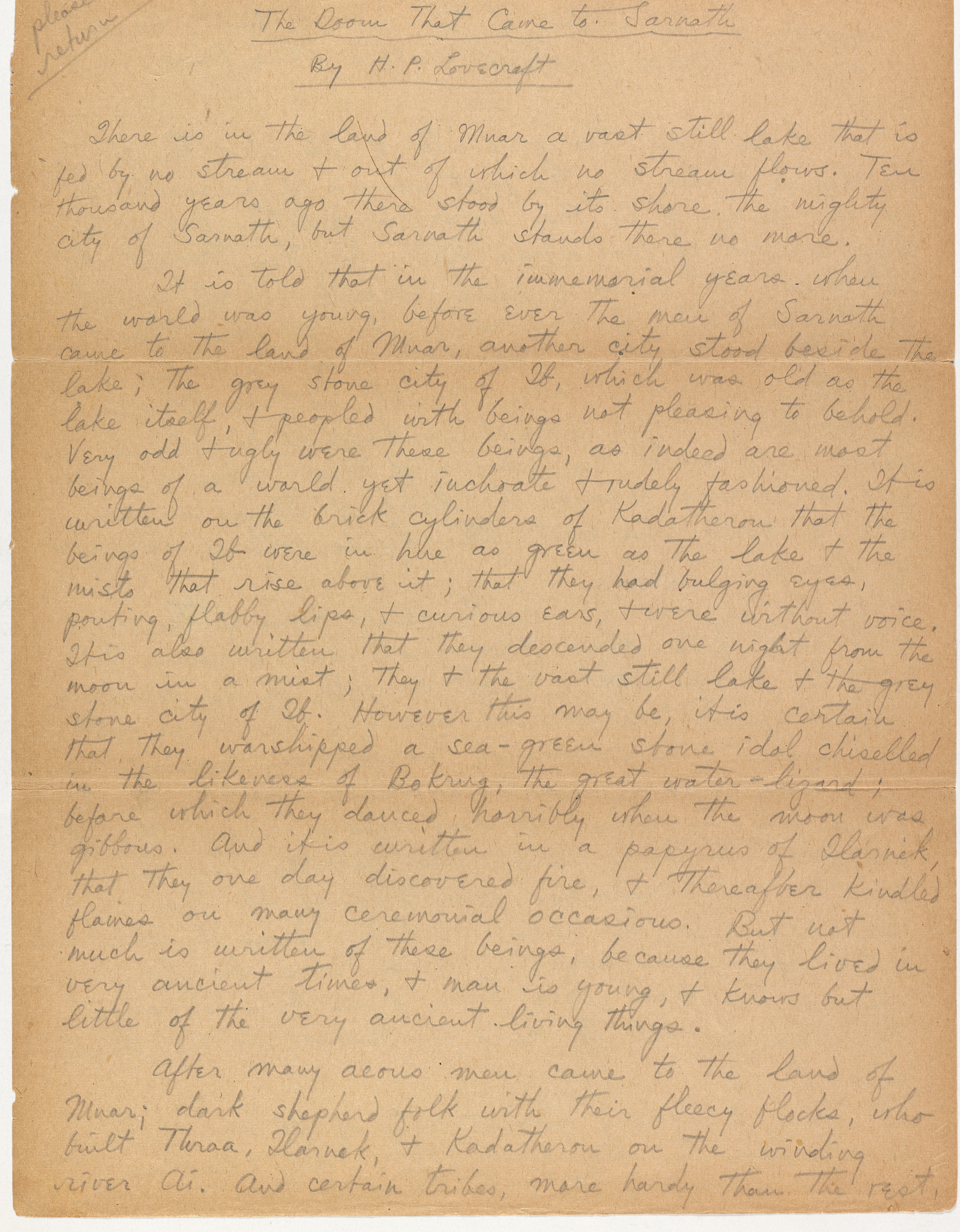

Text available at Wikisource
- Country: United States
- Language: English
- Genre: Fantasy

Publication
- Published in: The Scot
- Publication date: 1920

"The Doom That Came to Sarnath" (1920) is a fantasy short story by American writer H. P. Lovecraft. It is written in a mythic/fantasy style and is associated with his Dream Cycle. It was first published in The Scot, a Scottish amateur fiction magazine, in June 1920.

== Plot ==
According to the tale, 10,000 years prior to 1920, a race of shepherd people colonized the banks of the river Ai, in a land called Mnar, forming the cities of Thraa, Ilarnek, and Kadatheron (not to be confused with Kadath), which rose to great intellectual and mercantile prowess. Craving more land, a group of these hardy people migrated to the shores of a lonely and vast lake at the heart of Mnar, founding the city of Sarnath.

But the settlers were not alone. Not far from Sarnath was the ancient grey-stone city of Ib, inhabited by a strange race who had descended from the Moon. Lovecraft described them as "in hue as green as the lake and the mists that rise above it.... They had bulging eyes, pouting, flabby lips, and curious ears, and were without voices." These beings worshipped a strange god known as Bokrug, the Great Water Lizard, although it was more their physical form that caused the people of Sarnath to despise them.

The citizens of Sarnath killed all the creatures inhabiting Ib, destroyed the city, and took their idol as a trophy, placing it in Sarnath's main temple. The next night, the idol mysteriously vanished, and Taran-Ish, the high-priest of Sarnath, was found dead. Before dying, he had scrawled a single word onto the empty altar: "DOOM".

One thousand years later, Sarnath was at the zenith of both its power and decadence. Nobles from distant cities were invited to the feast in honor of Ib's destruction. That night, however, the revelry was disrupted by strange lights over the lake, heavy greenish mists, and the tidal marker, the granite pillar Akurion, was mostly submerged. Soon, many visitors fled, maddened by fear.

After this, some of the survivors reported seeing the long-dead inhabitants of Ib peering from the windows of the city's towers instead of the king and his retinue, while others refused to say exactly what they had seen. Those who returned saw nothing of those unlucky enough to be left behind; only empty marsh, many water lizards, and most disturbingly, the missing idol. Ever since then, Bokrug remained the chief god in the land of Mnar.

== Inspiration ==
The influence of Lord Dunsany on the story can be seen in the reference to a throne "wrought of one piece of ivory, though no man lives who knows whence so vast a piece could have come", which evokes the gate "carved out of one solid piece" of ivory in Dunsany's "Idle Days on the Yann".

Though Sarnath is a historical city in India —the place where the Buddha first taught— Lovecraft said that he thought he invented the name independently.

== Connections to other works by Lovecraft ==
In the story "The Quest of Iranon", the title character says, "I...have gazed on the marsh where Sarnath once stood." When the narrator of "The Nameless City" sees the ruins of the story, he says he "thought of Sarnath the Doomed, that stood in the land of Mnar when mankind was young, and of Ib, that was carved from grey stone before mankind existed." In At the Mountains of Madness, the city of the Elder Things is described as "a megalopolis ranking with such whispered prehuman blasphemies as Valusia, R'lyeh, Ib in the land of Mnar, and the Nameless City of Arabian Desert."

The inhabitants of Ib are known in the works of Lin Carter as the Thuum'ha.

== References in other media ==
- Mike Mignola's Batman: The Doom That Came to Gotham is an Elseworlds story which combines the character Batman with various elements of the Cthulhu mythos, and takes its name from "The Doom that Came to Sarnath".
- In the "Horror on the Orient Express" campaign of the roleplaying game Call of Cthulhu is a chapter which includes delegations from Sarnath and Ib to discuss the matter in front of King Kurates just before the 10 centuries are over.
- The Doom that Came to Wulfhafen by C. L. Werner, originally published 2002 in Inferno! issue 29.
- In Ron Lundeen's roleplaying adventure "Dreams of the Yellow King" for the game Pathfinder the players have the chance to witness the destruction of the city of Sarnath.
- NECRONOMIDOL's track, "Sarnath" is based on this tale. The lyrics include many obvious references to "The Doom That Came to Sarnath", such as having "Doom doom doom" backing the chorus as well as this particular part of the song's lyrics: "I will gouge, The sigil of Doom, Even if it takes 1000 years'" which directly reference the story, where it is said that it took 1000 years for Ib's vengeance to be fulfilled. The sigil of Doom is another plot element included in these lyrics, as well.
- Mnar and its cities are used as place names by George R. R. Martin in his high fantasy reference-book The World of Ice & Fire.

== See also ==
- The Doom That Came to Sarnath and Other Stories is also the title of a collection of short stories by Lovecraft, first published in February 1971.

== Sources ==
- Lovecraft, Howard P. (1986) [1920]. "The Doom That Came to Sarnath". In S. T. Joshi (ed.). Dagon and Other Macabre Tales (9th corrected printing ed.). Sauk City, WI: Arkham House. ISBN 0-87054-039-4. Definitive version.
