= What the Moon Brings =

- Short story by H. P. Lovecraft
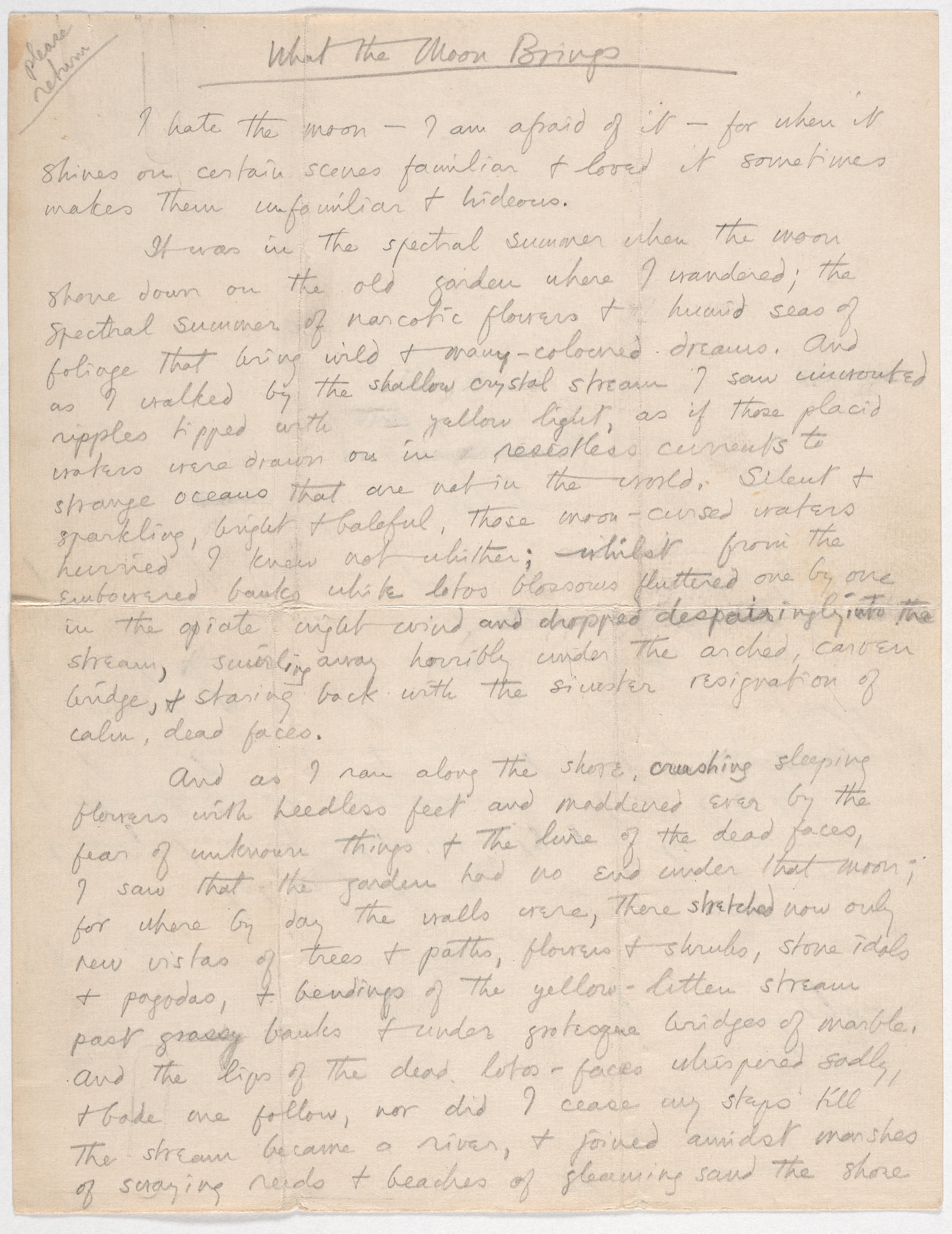
- What the Moon Brings

Text available at Wikisource
- Country: United States
- Language: English
- Genre: Horror short story

Publication
- Published in: The National Amateur
- Publication date: 1923

"What the Moon Brings" is a prose poem by American horror fiction writer H. P. Lovecraft, written on June 5, 1922. This story was first published in the National Amateur in May 1923. It's shorter than most of Lovecraft's other short stories, and is essentially a fragment. The story is based on one of Lovecraft's dreams, a common technique.

== Synopsis ==
This story is told from the first person view of an unnamed narrator. The story describes a surreal dreamscape. The narrator wanders through his garden one evening and, in the moonlight, witnesses many bizarre sights. He soon reaches a stream:

Silent and sparkling, bright and baleful, those moon-cursed waters hurried I knew not whither; whilst from the embowered banks white lotus-blossoms fluttered one by one in the opiate night-wind and dropped despairingly into the stream, swirling away horribly under the arched, carven bridge, and staring back with the sinister resignation of calm, dead faces.

After crossing a bridge, he realizes the garden has no end. Where the walls once stood are now trees and shrubs, with terrifying stone idols between each corner. The dead faces urge him on further and further, as the stream becomes a river before leading him to the shore of a sea. Suddenly, the lotus-faces disappear as the moon sinks into the horizon:

And as I saw therein the lotus-faces vanish, I longed for nets that I might capture them and learn from them the secrets which the moon had brought upon the night. But when that moon went over to the west and the still tide ebbed from the sullen shore, I saw in that light old spires that the waves almost uncovered, and white columns gay with festoons of green seaweed. And knowing that to this sunken place all the dead had come, I trembled and did not wish again to speak with the lotus-faces.

Soon, he finds himself staring down at the ruins of an ancient city, a city of the dead. The narrator sees a condor and wishes to ask it about the people he knows who have died. He watches the sea for a while, observing ripples in it, which he attributes as sea worms. He suddenly feels a chill and notices something far-off beneath the waves:

Nor had my flesh trembled without cause, for when I raised my eyes I saw that the waters had ebbed very low, shewing much of the vast reef whose rim I had seen before. And when I saw that the reef was but the black basalt crown of a shocking eikon whose monstrous forehead now shown in the dim moonlight and whose vile hooves must paw the hellish ooze miles below, I shrieked and shrieked lest the hidden face rise above the waters, and lest the hidden eyes look at me after the slinking away of that leering and treacherous yellow moon.

Fleeing this monstrous thing, he swims towards the sunken city:

And to escape this relentless thing, I plunged gladly and unhesitantly into the stinking shallows where amidst weedy walls and sunken streets fat sea-worms feast upon the world's dead.

The speaker clearly prefers death instead of madness to this perceived greater-horror revealed in carven grandeur. The tale concludes without confirming whether this was the ending of the speaker's life or not.

== Publication history ==
- "What the Moon Brings" was first published in the National Amateur in May 1923.
- It was republished in The Doom that Came to Sarnath by Ballantine Books in 1971 (Vol. 45, no. 5)
- It was republished again in Miscellaneous Writings by Arkham House in 1995 (edited by S. T. Joshi).
- It was republished again in Shadows of Death by Del Rey Books in 2005.
