= Old Bugs =

1919 short story by H. P. Lovecraft

- Short story by H. P. Lovecraft

Text available at Wikisource
- Country: United States
- Language: English

Publication
- Published in: The Shuttered Room and Other Pieces
- Publisher: Arkham House
- Publication date: 1959

"Old Bugs" is a short story by American horror fiction writer H. P. Lovecraft, probably written shortly before July 1919. It was first published in the Arkham House book The Shuttered Room and Other Pieces (1959).

== Plot ==
With the onset of Prohibition, the Sheehan Billiard Room in Chicago became a sordid haunt for hard drinkers. A certain Old Bugs, a mature man corroded by vices but capable of showing, at long intervals, the typical sensitivity of educated people works as a kitchen cleaner. When the young Alfred Trever, initiated by his friend Pete Schultz on the way of drinking, arrives at Sheehan's tavern, Old Bugs tries to convince him not to make the same mistake as he did.

== Creation ==
The piece was written after Lovecraft's friend Alfred Galpin's suggestion that he wanted to try alcohol before Prohibition went into effect. In response, Lovecraft, a teetotaler, wrote a tale of an old derelict known as Old Bugs, who turns out to be Galpin himself, brought low by "evil habits, dating from a first drink taken years before in woodland seclusion." At the bottom of the manuscript, Lovecraft had written, "Now will you be good?" The woman whose engagement to Old Bugs is canceled due to his drinking, Eleanor Wing, was a fellow student in Galpin's high school press club.

== Reception ==
An H. P. Lovecraft Encyclopedia says of the piece, "It is not nearly as ponderous as it sounds, and is in fact a little masterpiece of comic deflation and self-parody."
