= A Reminiscence of Dr. Samuel Johnson =

1917 short story by H. P. Lovecraft

- Short story by H. P. Lovecraft

Text available at Wikisource
- Country: United States
- Language: English
- Genre: Fantasy • humor

Publication
- Published in: United Amateur
- Media type: short story
- Publication date: 1917

"A Reminiscence of Dr. Samuel Johnson" is a short story written in 1917 by American horror fiction writer H. P. Lovecraft. It was first published in the September 1917 issue of the United Amateur, under the pseudonym Humphrey Littlewit, Esq.

The story is a spoof of Lovecraft's antiquarian affectations. Littlewit, the narrator, is born August 20, 1690 (200 years to the day before Lovecraft's birthdate), making him nearly 228 years old as he writes a memoir.

Critic Daniel Harms writes, "While not one of the most inspired of his pieces, it at least shows that HPL realized his pretensions... of being an older, cultured gentleman of an earlier era, and could make fun of himself."
