= Ex Oblivione =

Short story by H. P. Lovecraft (c. 1920)

- Short story by H. P. Lovecraft

Text available at Wikisource
- Country: United States
- Language: English
- Genre: Horror

Publication
- Published in: The United Amateur
- Media type: Print (magazine)
- Publication date: March 1921

"Ex Oblivione" is a prose poem by American horror fiction writer H. P. Lovecraft, written in late 1920 or early 1921 and first published in The United Amateur in March 1921, under the pseudonym Ward Phillips.

== Inspiration ==
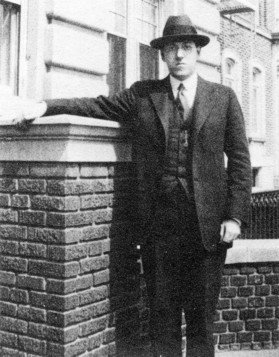
Lovecraft in 1922

An H. P. Lovecraft Encyclopedia suggests that the theme of "Ex Oblivione"—that nothingness is preferable to life—was derived from Lovecraft's reading the philosopher Arthur Schopenhauer. Lovecraft expressed similar sentiments in non-fiction work at the time, writing in In Defense of Dagon, "There is nothing better than oblivion, since in oblivion there is no wish unfulfilled."

== Synopsis ==
It is written in first person and tells of the dreams of a presumably dying man. In his dreams, the man is walking through a valley and encounters a vine-covered wall with a locked bronze gate therein. He longs to know what lies beyond the gate.

Then one night, the man dreams of the dream-city Zakarion, in which he finds a yellowed papyrus written by wise dream-sages who exist only within the dream world. The papyrus tells of the gate, with varying accounts of what lies beyond: some of the dream-sages tell of immense wonders, while others tell of horror and disappointment.

Despite this lack of unanimity, the man still wishes to see for himself, even knowing that whichever of these is true, there will be no return. Thus he reads further into the papyrus and learns of a drug which will unlock the gate.

The next night he swallows the drug and returns to the gate which is now ajar, but upon entering, he discovers that indeed both accounts within the papyrus are in a sense true: beyond is the wonderment of forever being free from the pain of the real world and the happy surprise that nothing lies beyond the gate but the infinite void that is death.
