= Ibid (short story) =

Short story by H. P. Lovecraft

- Short story by H. P. Lovecraft

Text available at Wikisource
- Country: United States
- Language: English
- Genre: Parody

Publication
- Published in: O-Wash-Ta-Nong
- Publication type: Periodical
- Media type: Print (Magazine)
- Publication date: January 1938

"Ibid" is a parody by American horror fiction writer H. P. Lovecraft, written in 1927 or 1928, and first published in the January 1938 issue of O-Wash-Ta-Nong.

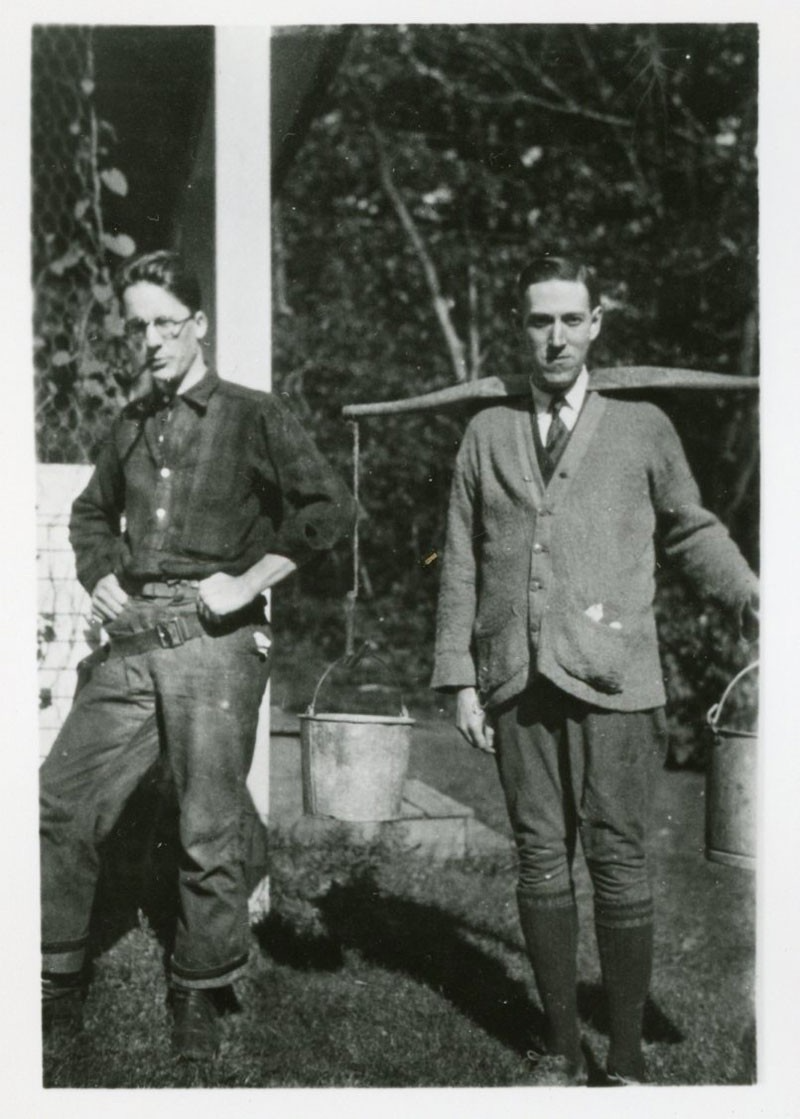
H. P. Lovecraft (right) in 1928, with writer Vrest Orton.

== Summary ==
"Ibid" is a mock biography of the fictional Roman scholar Ibidus (486–587), whose masterpiece was Op. Cit., "wherein all the significant undercurrents of Graeco-Roman thought were crystallized once and for all". The piece traces the skull of Ibidus, once the possession of Charlemagne, William the Conqueror, and other notables, to the United States, where it travels via Salem, Massachusetts, and Providence, Rhode Island, to a prairie dog hole in Milwaukee, Wisconsin.

== Satire ==
The story is prefaced with the epigraph "'...As Ibid says in his famous Lives of the Poets'—From a student theme". But S. T. Joshi and David E. Schultz report that the "target of the satire in 'Ibid' is not so much the follies of students as the pomposity of academic scholarship."
