= Memory (H. P. Lovecraft) =

1919 short story by H. P. Lovecraft

- Short story by H. P. Lovecraft

Text available at Wikisource
- Country: United States
- Language: English
- Genres: Horror short story, fantasy

Publication
- Published in: The United Co-operative
- Publication date: June 1919

"Memory" is a flash fiction short story by American horror and science fiction writer H. P. Lovecraft, written in 1919 and published in June in The United Co-operative.

== Themes ==
"Memory" uses many of Lovecraft's common images and ideas, such as relics of the deep past and things "without name". Also, his fondness for vast, monolithic ruins (a favourite with many other Cthulhu and horror writers) is evident in the intricate description found in this page-long story.

== Overview ==
This story takes place in the ancient valley of Nis, in vegetation-covered stone ruins described by Lovecraft in great detail. These crumbling blocks of monolithic stone now serve only for grey toads and snakes to nest under. Interspersed in the ruins are large trees that are home to little apes. Through the bottom of this valley runs the great, slimy red river called Than.

"Memory" involves only two characters: "the Genie that haunts the moonbeams" and "the Daemon of the Valley". The Genie inquires of the Daemon who it was that long ago placed the stones that were now the desolate ruin near the river Than. The Daemon replies that he remembers the name of the creatures "clearly," but only because their name rhymed with that of the river: they were called Man. He also remembers "dimly" that they appeared like the small apes that now leap through the ruins. The Genie flies back to his moonbeams, and the Daemon turns to regard an ape in silent contemplation.
