= The Horror in the Museum and Other Revisions =

1970 collection of stories revised or ghostwritten by H. P. Lovecraft

- Dust-jacket illustration by Gahan Wilson.
- Author: H. P. Lovecraft
- Cover artist: Gahan Wilson (original), Raymond Bayless (revised)
- Language: English
- Genre: Fantasy, horror, science fiction
- Publisher: Arkham House
- Publication date: 1970 (original), 1989 (revised)
- Publication place: United States
- Media type: Print (hardback)
- Pages: ix., 383 (original), x. 450 (revised)
- ISBN: 0-87054-040-8
- OCLC: 18715164
- Dewey Decimal: 813/.52 19
- LC Class: PS3523.O833 H6 1989

The Horror in the Museum and Other Revisions is a collection of stories revised or ghostwritten by American author H. P. Lovecraft. It was originally published in 1970 by Arkham House in an edition of 4,058 copies. The dustjacket of the first edition features art by Gahan Wilson.

The collection was revised in 1989 by S. T. Joshi adding an introduction by Joshi, correcting the texts and expanding the contents.

In 2007, Del Rey published a trade paperback version with a new introduction by Stephen Jones, and a brief biography of Lovecraft at the end.

The revised version of Lovecraft's revisions includes Henry S. Whitehead's "The Trap" but not the other two stories by Whitehead in which Lovecraft had a hand ("Cassius" and "Bothon"). The revised version also includes two collaborations by Lovecraft with Robert H. Barlow, but not the other tales on which they worked together, of which there are four or five. Sonia Greene's "Four O'Clock" is omitted from the revised version, S.T. Joshi having determined that this tale is not properly a part of the Lovecraft corpus; the story is entirely Sonia's, Lovecraft having simply made a few suggestions as to its prose style.

== Contents ==
=== Original ===
The Horror in the Museum and Other Revisions (original 1970 edition) contains the following 21 tales:

1. "Lovecraft's 'Revisions'" by August Derleth
2. "The Crawling Chaos" with Elizabeth Berkeley
3. "The Green Meadow" with Elizabeth Berkeley
4. "The Invisible Monster" by Sonia Greene
5. "Four O'Clock" by Sonia Greene
6. "The Man of Stone" by Hazel Heald
7. "Winged Death" by Hazel Heald
8. "The Loved Dead" by C. M. Eddy, Jr.
9. "Deaf, Dumb, and Blind" by C. M. Eddy, Jr.
10. "The Ghost-Eater" by C. M. Eddy, Jr.
11. "To All the Seas" by Robert H. Barlow
12. "The Horror in the Museum" by Hazel Heald
13. "Out of the Eons" by Hazel Heald
14. "The Diary of Alonzo Typer" by William Lumley
15. "The Horror in the Burying-Ground" by Hazel Heald
16. "The Last Test" by Adolphe de Castro
17. "The Electric Executioner" by Adolphe de Castro
18. "The Curse of Yig" by Zealia Bishop
19. "Medusa's Coil" by Zealia Bishop
20. The Mound by Zealia Bishop
21. "Two Black Bottles" by Wilfred Blanch Talman

=== Revised ===
Cover by Raymond Bayless of the 1989 corrected third printing of The Horror in the Museum and Other Revisions

The Horror in the Museum and Other Revisions (revised 1989 edition, designated by the publisher a "corrected third printing") contains the following 26 tales:

1. "A Note on the Texts" by S.T. Joshi
2. "Lovecraft's 'Revisions'" by August Derleth
3. "The Green Meadow" with Elizabeth Berkely
4. "The Crawling Chaos" with Elizabeth Berkely
5. "The Last Test" by Adolphe de Castro
6. "The Electric Executioner" by Adolphe de Castro
7. "The Curse of Yig" by Zealia Bishop
8. The Mound by Zealia Bishop
9. "Medusa's Coil" by Zealia Bishop
10. "The Man of Stone" by Hazel Heald
11. "The Horror in the Museum" by Hazel Heald
12. "Winged Death" by Hazel Heald
13. "Out of the Aeons" by Hazel Heald
14. "The Horror in the Burying-Ground" by Hazel Heald
15. "The Diary of Alonzo Typer" by William Lumley
16. "The Horror at Martin’s Beach" by Sonia H. Greene
17. "Ashes" by C. M. Eddy, Jr.
18. "The Ghost-Eater" by C. M. Eddy, Jr.
19. "The Loved Dead" by C. M. Eddy, Jr.
20. "Deaf, Dumb, and Blind" by C. M. Eddy, Jr.
21. "Two Black Bottles" by Wilfred Blanch Talman
22. "The Trap" by Henry S. Whitehead
23. "The Tree on the Hill" by Duane W. Rimel
24. "The Disinterment" by Duane W. Rimel
25. "'Till A’ the Seas" by R. H. Barlow
26. "The Night Ocean" by R. H. Barlow
