= Poetry and the Gods =

1920 short story by H. P. Lovecraft and Anna Helen Crofts

- Short story by: Anna Helen Crofts; H. P. Lovecraft (as Henry Paget-Lowe)

Text available at Wikisource
- Country: United States
- Language: English
- Genre: Fantasy

Publication
- Published in: United Amateur
- Publication type: Magazine
- Media type: Print
- Publication date: September 1920

"Poetry and the Gods" is a short story by H. P. Lovecraft and Anna Helen Crofts. The two authors wrote the story in or shortly before the summer of 1920. It was published the following September in United Amateur, which credits Lovecraft as Henry Paget-Lowe. In the story, a young woman dreams that she has an audience with Zeus, who explains to her that the gods have been asleep and dreaming, but they have chosen a poet who will herald their awakening.

The story was written after "The Green Meadow", and before "The Crawling Chaos"—two tales that Lovecraft and Winifred Jackson co-wrote with a Greek mythology basis. What Anna Helen Crofts contributed to "Poetry and the Gods" is unknown. Lovecraft scholar S. T. Joshi reports that she "appeared sporadically in the amateur press, and may have been introduced to [Lovecraft] by Winifred Jackson." Lovecraft's surviving letters do not mention "Poetry and the Gods".

In his 1955 essay on the Cthulhu Mythos, Lovecraft scholar George Wetzel compares the messenger god Hermes in "Poetry and the Gods" with Nyarlathotep, the "messenger of Azathoth". Wetzel considers the dream communication used by Hermes to be "the same psychic device used later by Cthulhu to contact his cult followers."

== Plot ==
The story begins in a drawing room on an April evening "just after the Great War". A young woman, Marcia, is there alone, feeling an "immeasurable gulf that [separates] her soul" from her uninspiring surroundings: 20th-century life and the "strange home" in which she lives. She wonders whether she was born in the wrong age. She leafs through a magazine to look for some soothing poetry, and lands on an atmospheric free verse poem. With its sensually rich images, the poem sends her into a reverie. Marcia believes it to herald a new age. She repeats its words to herself as she drifts off to sleep. Hermes appears before her sleeping body, and confirms that a new age is indeed coming: one in which the gods wake from their own dream-filled sleep, and take action.

Hermes carries her to the court of Zeus, where Apollo, Dionysus, the Muses, and the Bacchae also wait. "Long have we… spoken only through our dreams," Zeus tells her, "but the time approaches when our voices shall not be silent. It is a time of awakening and change." He says that the gods have chosen a poet "to blend into one glorious whole all the beauty that the world hath known before, and to write words wherein shall echo all the wisdom and the loveliness of the past." This consummate poet is to be the harbinger of the gods' awakening. He was chosen not only by the gods themselves, but by select poets whom Zeus and Apollo granted immortality and honor. In turn, these six poets come forth and contribute lines of verse: Homer, Dante, Goethe, Shakespeare, Milton, and Keats. They continue until just before dawn, and Hermes carries Marcia back to her house.

Years later, Marcia is with the poet foretold by Zeus. When she tells him that his poetry is "fit for the gods", Zeus sends her a vision and declares: "By his word shall thy steps be guided to happiness, and in his dreams of beauty shall thy spirit find all that it craveth."

== See also ==
- "Nyarlathotep" (1920)
- The Bacchae
