= Something About Cats and Other Pieces =

1949 collection of short stories, poetry and essays by H. P. Lovecraft

- Jacket illustration by Ronald Clyne for Something About Cats
- Author: H. P. Lovecraft
- Cover artist: Ronald Clyne
- Language: English
- Genre: Fantasy, horror, science fiction
- Publisher: Arkham House
- Publication date: 1949
- Publication place: United States
- Media type: Print (hardback)
- Pages: ix, 306 pp

Something About Cats and Other Pieces is a collection of fantasy, horror and science fiction short stories, poetry and essays by American author H. P. Lovecraft. 2,995 copies were released in 1949 and was the fourth collection of Lovecraft's work published by Arkham House.

The stories for this volume were selected by August Derleth.

== Contents ==
Something About Cats and Other Pieces contains the following tales:

1. "A Prefatory Note" by August Derleth
2. "The Invisible Monster" by Sonia Greene
3. "Four O'Clock" by Sonia Greene
4. "The Horror in the Burying Ground" by Hazel Heald
5. "The Last Test" by Adolphe de Castro
6. "The Electric Executioner" by Adolphe de Castro
7. "Satan's Servants" by Robert Bloch. Note: This tale is sometime listed as 'revised' by Lovecraft, as indeed, it was presented here. However, while Lovecraft lent advice on this early tale of Bloch's (which was first written 1935) he does not appear to have written any prose in the story. Lovecraft's notes amounting to a page and half of comments and suggestions are printed here as an appendix.
8. "The Despised Pastoral"
9. "Time and Space"
10. "Merlinus Redivivus"
11. "At the Root"
12. "The Materialist Today"
13. "Vermont: A First Impression"
14. "The Battle That Ended the Century"
15. "Notes for The Shadow Over Innsmouth"
16. "Discarded Draught of The Shadow Over Innsmouth"
17. "Notes for At the Mountains of Madness"
18. "Notes for The Shadow Out of Time"
19. "Phaeton"
20. "August"
21. "To the American Flag"
22. "To a Youth"
23. "My Favorite Character"
24. "To Templeton and Mount Manadnock"
25. "The House"
26. "The City"
27. "The Po-et's Nightmare"
28. "Sir Thomas Tryout"
29. "Lament for the Vanished Spider"
30. "Regnar Lodbrug's Epicedium"
31. "A Memoir of Lovecraft" by Rheinhart Kleiner
32. "Howard Phillips Lovecraft" by Samuel Loveman
33. "Lovecraft as I Knew Him" by Sonia Greene (as by Sonia H. Davis)
34. "Lovecraft's Sensitivity" by August Derleth
35. "Lovecraft's Conservative" by August Derleth
36. "The Man Who Was Lovecraft" by E. Hoffmann Price
37. "A Literary Copernicus" by Fritz Leiber, Jr.
38. "Providence: Two Gentlemen Meet at Midnight" by August Derleth
39. "HPL" by Vincent Starrett

== Reprints ==
- New York: Books for Libraries Press, 1971.
