= YIG =

YIG or Yig may refer to:

== Organizations ==
- Your Independent Grocer, a Canadian Grocery store
- YMCA Youth in Government, alternative name for YMCA Youth and Government

== Science and technology ==
- Yttrium iron garnet, a synthetic garnet
  - YIG sphere, an yttrium-iron-garnet-based microwave-frequency filter

== Various media ==
- Yig (the Father of Serpents), a deity in H.P. Lovecraft's Cthulhu mythos
  - The Curse of Yig, short story by H.P.Lovecraft and Zealia Bishop
  - The Curse of Yig (book), collection of stories by Zealia Bishop
