= The Curse of Yig (book) =

1953 collection of short stories and essays by Zealia Bishop

- Jacket illustration by Ronald Clyne for The Curse of Yig
- Author: Zealia B. Bishop
- Cover artist: Ronald Clyne
- Language: English
- Genre: Fantasy, horror
- Publisher: Arkham House
- Publication date: 1953
- Publication place: United States
- Media type: Print (hardback)
- Pages: 175

The Curse of Yig is a collection of fantasy and horror short stories and essays by American writer Zealia Bishop. It was released in 1953 and was the author's only collection published by Arkham House. It was released in an edition of 1,217 copies.

The three stories had originally appeared in the magazine Weird Tales and were co-written by H. P. Lovecraft. The stories are part of the Cthulhu Mythos.

== Contents ==
The Curse of Yig contains the following tales:

- "The Curse of Yig"
- "Medusa's Coil"
- "The Mound"
- "H.P. Lovecraft: A Pupil's View"
- "A Wisconsin Balzac: A Profile of August Derleth"

== Reception ==
Boucher and McComas, while dismissing the fiction as "three negligible stories from Weird Tales, praised the "two first-rate biographical profiles."

== Sources ==
- Jaffery, Sheldon; Fred Cook (1985). The Collector's Index to Weird Tales. Bowling Green, OH: Bowling Green State University Popular Press. ISBN 0-87972-284-3.
- Jaffery, Sheldon (1989). The Arkham House Companion. Mercer Island, WA: Starmont House, Inc. pp. 43–44. ISBN 1-55742-005-X.
- Chalker, Jack L.; Mark Owings (1998). The Science-Fantasy Publishers: A Bibliographic History, 1923-1998. Westminster, MD and Baltimore: Mirage Press, Ltd. p. 35.
- Joshi, S.T. (1999). Sixty Years of Arkham House: A History and Bibliography. Sauk City, WI: Arkham House. pp. 59–60. ISBN 0-87054-176-5.
- Nielsen, Leon (2004). Arkham House Books: A Collector's Guide. Jefferson, NC and London: McFarland & Company, Inc. p. 75. ISBN 0-7864-1785-4.
