= Shub-Niggurath =

Fictional deity in the Cthulhu Mythos

- Cthulhu Mythos character
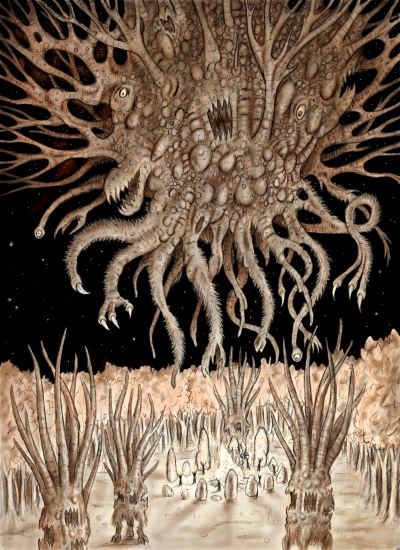
- Artistic portrayal of Shub-Niggurath, along with her "Thousand Young"
- First appearance: "The Last Test"
- Created by: H. P. Lovecraft

In-universe information
- Alias: The Black Goat with thousand young
- Nickname: "The All Mother"
- Species: Other God/Outer God
- Gender: Female
- Title: Black Goat of the Woods with a Thousand Young
- Occupation: One of the Outer gods and a member of the Court of Azathoth
- Spouses: Hastur (in the present) and Yog-sothoth (in the past)
- Children: Ithaqua, Zhar, Lloigor and the Dark Youngs of Shub-Niggurath (with Hastur) and Nug and Yeb (with Yog-sothoth)
- Home: Yaddith

Shub-Niggurath is a fictional deity created by H. P. Lovecraft. She is often associated with the phrase "The Black Goat of the Woods with a Thousand Young". The only other name by which Lovecraft referred to her was "Lord of the Wood" in his story The Whisperer in Darkness.

Shub-Niggurath is first mentioned in Lovecraft's revision story "The Last Test" (1928); she is not described by Lovecraft, but is frequently mentioned or called upon in incantations. Most of her development as a literary figure was carried out by other Mythos authors, including August Derleth, Robert Bloch, and Ramsey Campbell.

Lovecraft explicitly defined Shub-Niggurath as a mother goddess in The Mound, where he calls her "Shub-Niggurath, the All-Mother". He describes her as a kind of Astarte in the same story. In Out of the Aeons, she is one of the deities siding with humanity against "hostile gods".

August Derleth classified Shub-Niggurath as a Great Old One, but the Call of Cthulhu role-playing game classifies her as an Outer God. On the other hand, the CthulhuTech role-playing game classifies Shub-Niggurath as a Great Old One.

Shub-Niggurath also had children with Hastur in present as she is the mate of Hastur, and in the past she had offsprings with Yog-sothoth too.

== Development ==
Shub-Niggurath's appearances in Lovecraft's main body of fiction do not provide much detail about his conception of the entity. Her first mention under Lovecraft's byline was in "The Dunwich Horror" (1928), where a quote from the Necronomicon discussing the Old Ones breaks into an exclamation of "Iä! Shub-Niggurath!" The story provides no further information about this peculiar expression.

The next Lovecraft story to mention Shub-Niggurath is scarcely more informative. In The Whisperer in Darkness (1930), a recording of a ceremony involving human and nonhuman worshippers includes the following exchange:

Ever Their praises, and abundance to the Black Goat of the Woods. Iä! Shub-Niggurath!
Iä! Shub-Niggurath! The Black Goat of the Woods with a Thousand Young!

Similarly unexplained exclamations occur in "The Dreams in the Witch House" (1932) and "The Thing on the Doorstep" (1933).

== Revision tales ==
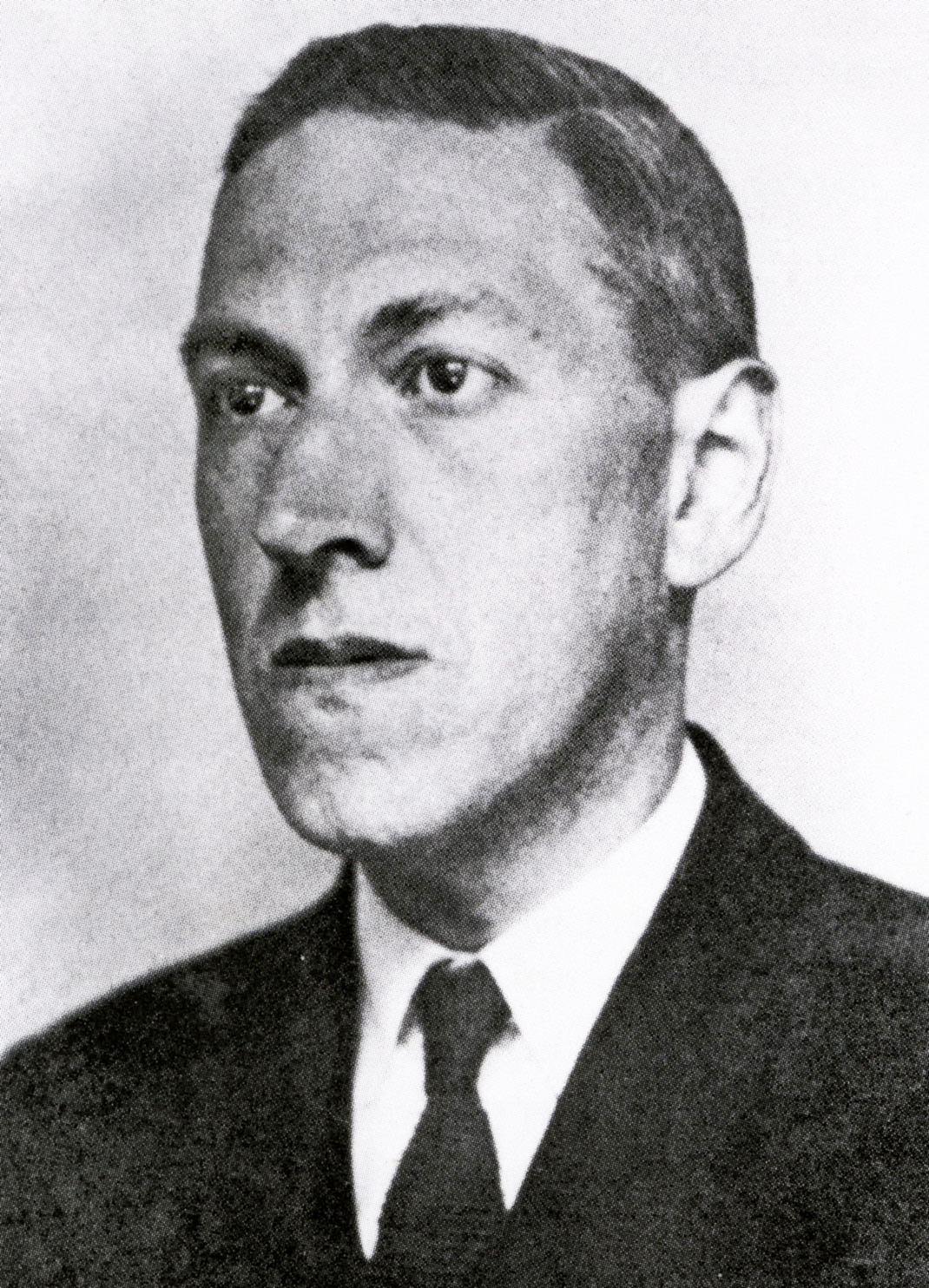
H. P. Lovecraft, Shub-Niggurath's creator

Lovecraft only provided specific information about Shub-Niggurath in his "revision tales", stories published under the names of clients for whom he ghost-wrote. As Price points out, "For these clients he constructed a parallel myth-cycle to his own, a separate group of Great Old Ones", including Yig, Ghatanothoa, Rhan-Tegoth, "the evil twins Nug and Yeb"—and Shub-Niggurath.

While some of these revision stories just repeat the familiar exclamations, others provide new elements of lore. In "The Last Test" (1927), the first mention of Shub-Niggurath seems to connect her to Nug and Yeb: "I talked in Yemen with an old man who had come back from the Crimson Desert—he had seen Irem, the City of Pillars, and had worshipped at the underground shrines of Nug and Yeb—Iä! Shub-Niggurath!"

The revision story The Mound, which describes the discovery of an underground realm called K'n-yan by a Spanish conquistador, reports that a temple of Tsathoggua there "had been turned into a shrine of Shub-Niggurath, the All-Mother and wife of the Not-to-Be-Named-One. This deity was a kind of sophisticated Astarte, and her worship struck the pious Catholic as supremely obnoxious."

The reference to "Astarte", the consort of Baal in Semitic mythology, ties Shub-Niggurath to the related fertility goddess Cybele, the Magna Mater mentioned in Lovecraft's "The Rats in the Walls", and implies that the "great mother worshipped by the hereditary cult of Exham Priory" in that story "had to be none other than Shub-Niggurath".

The Not-to-Be-Named-One, not being named, is difficult to identify; a similar phrase, translated into Latin as the Magnum Innominandum, appears in a list in The Whisperer in Darkness and was included in a scrap of incantation that Lovecraft wrote for Robert Bloch's "The Shambler from the Stars". August Derleth identifies this mysterious entity with Hastur (though Hastur appears in the same Whisperer in Darkness list with the Magnum Innominandum), while Robert M. Price equates him with Yog-Sothoth—though he also suggests that Shub-Niggurath's mate is implicitly the snake god Yig.

Finally, in "Out of the Aeons", a revision tale set in part on the lost continent of Mu, Lovecraft describes the character T'yog as the "High Priest of Shub-Niggurath and guardian of the copper temple of the Goat with a Thousand Young". In the story, T'yog surprisingly maintains that "the gods friendly to man could be arrayed against the hostile gods, and ... that Shub-Niggurath, Nug, and Yeb, as well as Yig the Serpent-god, were ready to take sides with man" against the more malevolent Ghatanothoa. Shub-Niggurath is called "the Mother Goddess", and reference is made to "her sons", presumably Nug and Yeb.

=== Other references ===
Other evidence of Lovecraft's conception of Shub-Niggurath can be found in his letters. For example, in a letter to Willis Conover, Lovecraft described her as an "evil cloud-like entity". "Yog-Sothoth's wife is the hellish cloud-like entity Shub-Niggurath, in whose honor nameless cults hold the rite of the Goat with a Thousand Young. By her he has two monstrous offspring—the evil twins Nug and Yeb. He has also begotten hellish hybrids upon the females of various organic species throughout the universes of space-time."

== The Black Goat ==
Although Shub-Niggurath is often associated with the epithet "The Black Goat of the Woods with a Thousand Young", it is possible that this Black Goat is a separate entity. Rodolfo Ferraresi, in his essay "The Question of Shub-Niggurath", says that Lovecraft himself separated the two in his writings, such as in "Out of the Aeons" (1935) in which a distinction is made between Shub-Niggurath and the Black Goat—the goat is the figurehead through which Shub-Niggurath is worshipped. In apparent contrast to Shub-Niggurath, the Black Goat is sometimes depicted as a male, most notably in the rite performed in The Whisperer in Darkness (1931) in which the Black Goat is called the "Lord of the Woods". However, Lovecraft clearly associates Shub-Niggurath with The Black Goat of the Woods with a Thousand Young in two of his stories—"The Dreams in the Witch House" and "The Thing on the Doorstep".

It is possible that The Black Goat is actually Ny-Rakath, Shub-Niggurath's brother. The Black Goat may also be the personification of Pan, since Lovecraft was influenced by Arthur Machen's The Great God Pan (1890), a story that inspired Lovecraft's "The Dunwich Horror" (1929). In this incarnation, the Black Goat may represent Satan in the form of the satyr, a half-man, half-goat. In folklore, the satyr symbolized a man with excessive sexual appetites. The Black Goat may otherwise be a male, earthly form of Shub-Niggurath—an incarnation she assumes to copulate with her worshipers.

== Robert M. Price's interpretation ==
Robert M. Price points to a passage from "Idle Days on the Yann", by Lord Dunsany, one of Lovecraft's favorite writers, as the source for the name Shub-Niggurath:

And I too felt that I would pray. Yet I liked not to pray to a jealous God there where the frail affectionate gods whom the heathen love were being humbly invoked; so I bethought me, instead, of Sheol Nugganoth, whom the men of the jungle have long since deserted, who is now unworshipped and alone; and to him I prayed.

Notes Price: "The name already carried a whiff of sulfur: Sheol was the name for the Netherworld mentioned in the Bible and the Gilgamesh Epic."

As for Shub-Niggurath's association with the symbol of the goat, Price writes,

we may believe that here Lovecraft was inspired by the traditional Christian depiction of the Baphomet Goat, an image of Satan harking back to the pre-Christian woodland deity Pan, he of the goatish horns and shanks. The Satanic goat is a device of much spectral fiction, as when in Dennis Wheatley's The Devil Rides Out the Archfiend's epiphany takes goat-headed form.

== Censorship ==
In 2026, Chaosium renamed Shub-Niggurath to "Shub-Gorath" for their board game Call of Cthulhu: Old Ones. In an official statement, they said that some gamers interpreted the original name as containing the racial slur "nigger," and that although Lovecraft scholars agree that the name was not derived from it, the verbal similarity was creating a Scunthorpe problem that triggered automatic internet filters. The name "Shub-Gorath" was derived from "Shuma-Gorath", an elder god mentioned in Robert E. Howard's short story "The Curse of the Golden Skull." This change was met with controversy, and Sandy Petersen, author of Chaosium's first Cthulhu Mythos product, the Call of Cthulhu tabletop role-playing game, expressed his disagreement.

In the same year, Fantasy Flight Games removed all references to Shub-Niggurath and its followers in a rerelease of its board game Arkham Horror. It was replaced by an unrelated elder god named "Magh'an Ark'at," an original creation of the company. No explanation was given for the change, although online speculation was that it was for the same reasons given by Chaosium.

== In popular culture ==
- Night in the Woods, an adventure game where a god-like "Black Goat" is said to torment the main character
- Quake, a first-person shooter where Shub-Niggurath serves as the main antagonist
- Shub-Niggurath is present in the video game South Park: The Fractured But Whole
- She is one of the antagonists in Alone in the Dark (2024)

== See also ==
- List of works influenced by the Cthulhu Mythos
- Pan and Echidna, similar deities in ancient Greece.
- Akerbeltz
- Shuma-Gorath, a cosmic antagonist mentioned in Conan the Barbarian and Marvel Comics stories
