= White Stallion Ranch =

Guest ranch in Pima County, Arizona

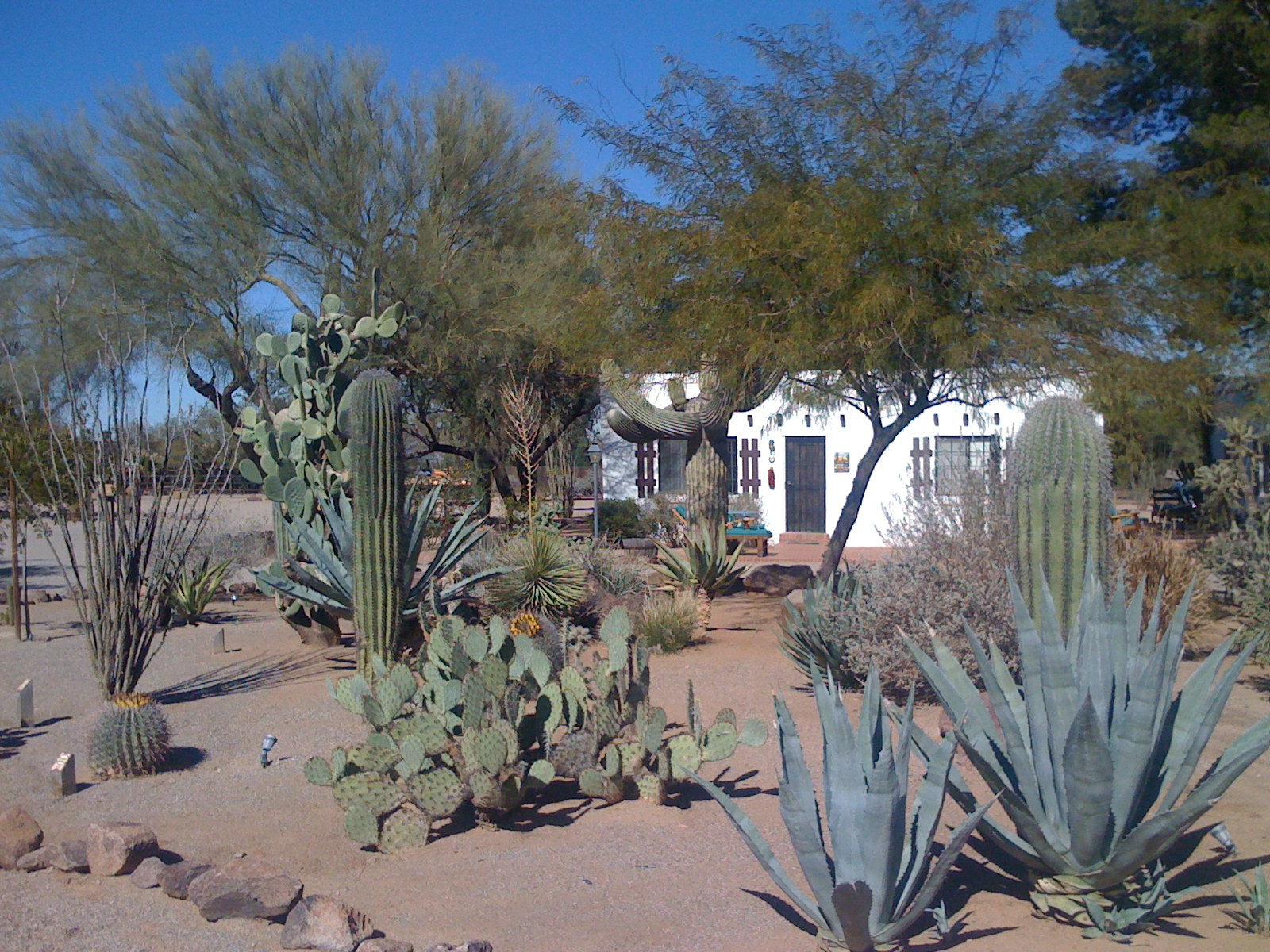
- The ranch in 2008

General information
- Location: 9251 W. Twin Peaks Rd., Picture Rocks, Arizona
- Coordinates: 32.3725°N 111.1644°W
- Completed: 1945

The White Stallion Ranch, in Picture Rocks, Pima County, Arizona near Tucson, is a historic guest ranch. It is one of only two surviving dude ranches of the Tucson area, where there once were 20 or so.

It was founded in 1900 as squatter's cattle ranch. Legal ownership was established via homesteading in 1936, and it was opened as a guest ranch, also known as a dude ranch, in the early 1940s, when it was known as the CB Bar Ranch. Six buildings where guests could stay were built after the property was acquired by Max Zimmerman in 1945, and it became the MZ Bar Ranch. Or it was bought in 1940 by "Chicago liquor store owner Max Zimmerman", who had moved to the area "to become part of the once vibrant guest ranching industry in Tucson."

Its 3,000 acres (12 km^{2}) property adjoins the Saguaro National Park's western unit, the Tucson Mountain District, to the south. The MZ Bar Ranch grew a reputation in the film industry, and its vicinity was a filming location for numerous westerns, including The Last Round-Up (1947), Relentless (1948), The Gal Who Took the West (1949), and Winchester 73 (1950).

It is a member of the Historic Hotels of America (HHA), a program of the National Trust for Historic Preservation, and was an HHA "Awards of Excellence" winner in 2016.

== See also ==
- Hacienda Del Sol Guest Ranch Resort, Tucson, Arizona. The other surviving dude ranch, which is also an HHA member.
