= Out of the Aeons =

1935 short story by H. P. Lovecraft

- Short story by H. P. Lovecraft and Hazel Heald
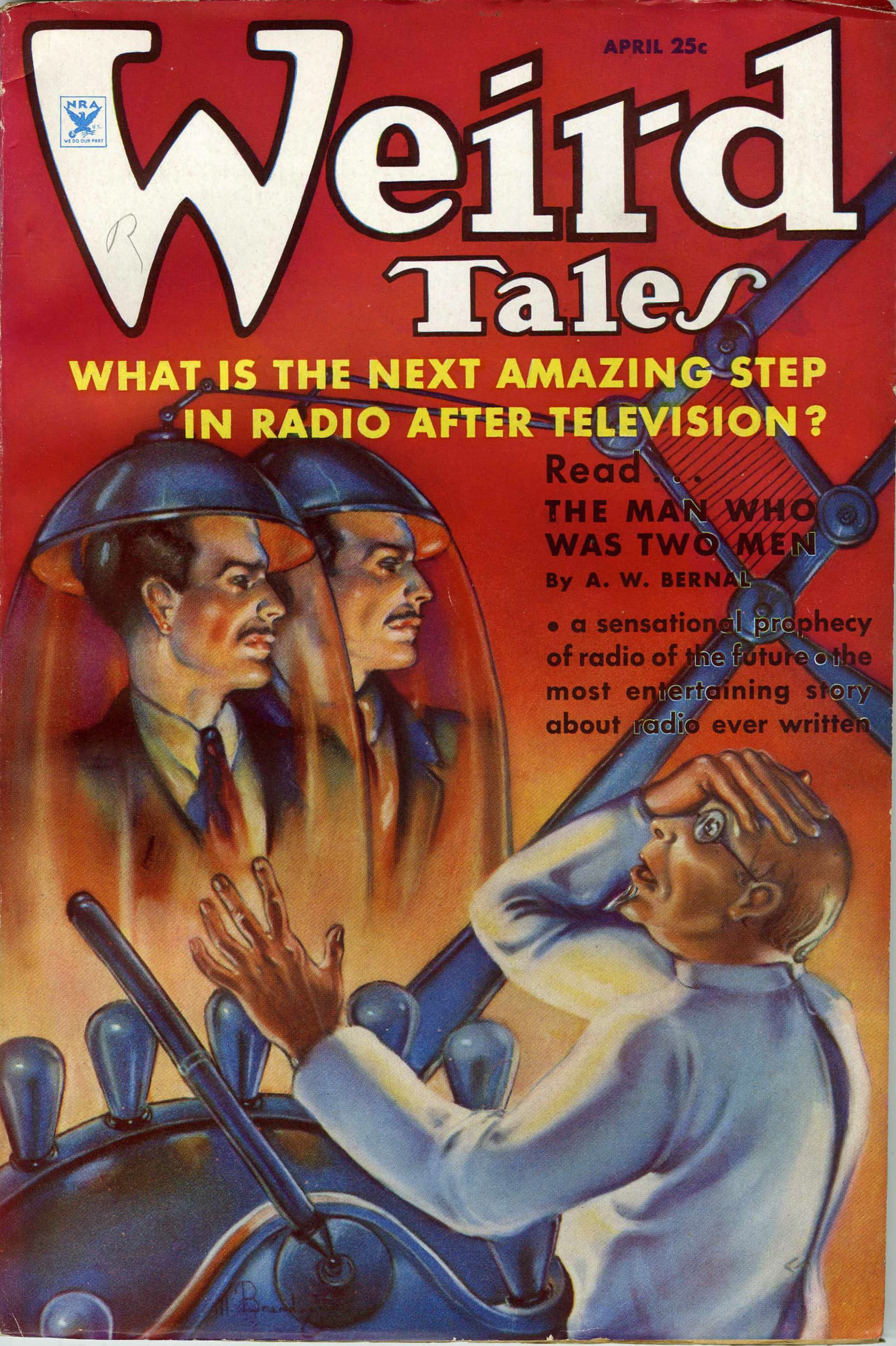
- "Out of the Aeons" was published in volume 25, issue 4 of Weird Tales in April 1935

Text available at Wikisource
- Country: United States
- Language: English
- Genre: Horror

Publication
- Published in: Weird Tales
- Publication type: Print, magazine
- Publication date: April 1935

"Out of the Aeons" is a short story by American writers H. P. Lovecraft and Hazel Heald, a writer from Somerville, Massachusetts. First published in the April 1935 issue of Weird Tales magazine, it was one of five stories Lovecraft revised for Heald. It focuses on a Boston museum that displays an ancient mummy recovered from a sunken island. The story is told from the point of view of the curator of the Cabot Museum in Boston.

== Plot ==
The story is presented as a letter left by the late Richard H. Johnson, former curator of the Cabot Museum of Archaeology in Boston, Massachusetts. He described the events that led to a break-in at the museum which was only to be revealed in full upon his death. In 1879, a freighter captain discovered an uncharted island, presumably risen from its sunken state due to volcanic activity. From it, he recovered a strange mummy and a metal cylinder containing a scroll. A year later, the mummy is put on display in the museum, and the island mysteriously vanishes without a trace.

Over the years, the mummy gains a reputation as a possible link to an ancient tale from the Black Book by Friedrich von Juntz of a man named T'yog, who challenged Ghatanothoa, one of the gods of Yuggoth, using the power of a magical scroll, the work of the Great Old Ones opposed to Ghatanothoa. In his sleep, however, one of the cultists stole the true magical scroll and replaced it with a fake one, and T'yog was never seen again. When the possible link to the Black Book and T'yog reaches the general public, the narrator begins to notice more and more suspect foreigners coming to the museum.

Soon, several attempts are made to steal the mummy. During one attempt, two men, armed with the true scroll, die as the mummy seemingly springs to life, opening its eyes and revealing an image of the approaching form of Ghatanothoa. The image had the power of Ghatanothoa to mummify any who view it, turning one of the thieves into a mummy, but the image had faded by the time the curator examines it, and it only frightens the curator. Though he never understands what he has seen, the curator is horribly shaken. He orders an autopsy of the mummy's braincase. The curator and all present are shocked that the mummy's brain is still alive. The mummy is the living remains of T'yog, and is fully aware of its surroundings.

== Connections ==
- Several members of Lovecraft's Cthulhu Mythos are mentioned in this story, including Shub-Niggurath and Yig, who inspire T'Yog with the scroll to ward off Ghatanothoa's power.
- The first curator of the Cabot Museum was named "Pickman", sharing a name with the eponymous character of Lovecraft's "Pickman's Model".
- One of the visitors to the museum is a strange man who calls himself "Swami Chandraputra." This is actually Randolph Carter, who, as described in "Through the Gates of the Silver Key," uses that alias after his mind is trapped in an alien body.
- The story helped inspire the Xothic legend cycle of Lin Carter.
- The description of the scroll the mummy is found with, being in a tube of unknown metal, written on a blueish parchment, and using green pigment, is the same as what was provided to the character Zamacona to write with in the later story The Mound, implying a link between the subterranean culture in that short story and the mummy.

== Reprints ==
The tale was republished in 2012 in Medusa's Coil and Others.

== Adaptations ==
Robert Bloch wrote a screen adaptation of the story for the 1971 TV series Night Gallery, however it was not produced. It was rewritten by Alvin T. Sapinsley, filmed, and broadcast as "Last Rites of a Dead Druid". Sapinsley's screenplay bore no relation to the original Lovecraft tale that Bloch had adapted.
