= Tucson artifacts =

Hoax artifacts from Picture Rocks, Arizona

The Tucson artifacts, sometimes called the Tucson Lead Crosses, Tucson Crosses, Silverbell Road artifacts, or Silverbell artifacts, were thirty-one lead objects that Charles E. Manier and his family found in 1924 near Picture Rocks, Arizona, that were initially thought by some to be created by early Mediterranean civilizations that had crossed the Atlantic in the first century, but were later determined to be a hoax.

The find consisted of thirty-one lead objects, including crosses, swords, and religious/ceremonial paraphernalia, most of which bore Hebrew or Latin engraved inscriptions, pictures of temples, leaders' portraits, angels, and a dinosaur (inscribed on the lead blade of a sword). One contained the phrase "Calalus, the unknown land", which was used by believers as the name of the settlement. The objects also have Roman numerals ranging from 790 to 900 inscribed on them, which were sometimes interpreted to represent the date of their creation. The site contains no other artifacts, no pottery sherds, no broken glass, no human or animal remains, and no sign of hearths or housing. The lack of contextual archaeological material has long been cited as a primary reason to doubt the authenticity of the artifacts, since legitimate settlement sites typically produce a diverse assemblage of debris accumulated through normal human activity. The stylistic inconsistencies among the pieces—some crudely cast, others surprisingly refined—have also encouraged debates about whether multiple individuals might have contributed to their manufacture. The presence of an anachronistic dinosaur inscription puzzled early researchers and later fueled arguments that the artifacts were satirical in nature rather than deceptive. Some fringe writers, however, used the dinosaur image to advance claims about ancient knowledge of prehistoric animals. Meanwhile, metallurgical examinations over the decades have attempted to determine the purity and source of the lead, though studies remain inconclusive due to contamination and inconsistent testing methodologies. The artifacts’ mixture of religious iconography, Roman dates, and invented historical references creates an eclectic narrative unlike anything known in Old World textual traditions, suggesting that the hoaxer—or hoaxers—had access to various popular history books, Latin grammars, and perhaps local missionary literature. Despite the irregularities, the objects’ craftsmanship has fascinated hobbyists and collectors who view them as part of the Southwest’s tradition of eccentric frontier artifacts.

== History ==
On September 13, 1924, Charles Manier and his father stopped to examine some old lime kilns while driving northwest of Tucson on Silverbell Road. Manier saw an object protruding about 2 inches (5.1 cm) from the soil. He dug it out, revealing that it was a lead cross measuring 20 inches (51 cm) and weighing 64 pounds (29 kg). Between 1924 and 1930 additional objects were extracted from the caliche, a layer of soil in which the soil particles have been cemented together by lime. Caliche often takes a long period of time to form, but it can be made and placed around an article in a short period of time, according to a report written by James Quinlan, a retired Tucson geologist who had worked for the U.S. Geological Survey. Quinlan also concluded that it would be easy to bury articles in the soft, silt material, and associated caliche in the lime kiln where the objects were found at the margin of prior trenches. The objects were believed, by their discoverer and main supporters, to be of a Roman Judeo-Christian colony existing in what is now known as Arizona between 790 and 900 AD. No other find has been formally established as placing any Roman colony in the area, nor anywhere else in North America. Early accounts described Manier as deeply shaken by the size and weight of the initial cross, convinced he had uncovered something of profound historical significance. Local interest grew rapidly, and informal excavations were soon carried out by curious residents, often without proper documentation. This lack of systematic methodology created long-lasting problems for archaeological evaluation, as precise stratigraphic data were lost. The Manier family, believing they had discovered tangible proof of forgotten settlers, began contacting museums and journalists in the hope that professionals would confirm their conclusions. While some local scholars initially reacted with enthusiasm, others urged caution, noting that the site had been disturbed in earlier decades during lime-processing operations that could have created artificial contexts. As the debate intensified, the artifacts became embroiled in local politics, with some community members advocating for preservation of the site as a historic landmark and others dismissing the entire affair as foolishness. The period between 1924 and 1930 saw numerous unofficial digs, fueled partly by the Great Depression and the hope that more valuable relics might be found. Ultimately, the prolonged activity around the site shaped the legend of the Tucson artifacts as much as the objects themselves.

In November 1924, Manier brought his friend Thomas Bent to the site and Bent was quickly convinced of the authenticity of the discovery. Upon finding the land was not owned, he immediately set up residence there, in order to homestead the property. Bent felt there was money to be made in further excavating the site. Bent’s enthusiasm went beyond financial motives; he became emotionally invested in the narrative the artifacts seemed to suggest. He envisioned himself as the discoverer of a forgotten chapter of Western history and increasingly viewed professional archaeologists who questioned the find as elitist gatekeepers. Bent began keeping detailed notes, sketching the layout of the trenches, and tracking each new item removed from the caliche, though his documentation lacked the rigor modern archaeology requires. His decision to homestead the site generated tension with neighboring land users, who regarded his obsession as eccentric or opportunistic. Bent also started corresponding with antiquarians across the country, hoping to gain validation from someone with scholarly influence. Although most experts dismissed the artifacts as crude forgeries, a small circle of amateur historians encouraged Bent, reinforcing his belief that the site had enormous historical significance. This encouragement shaped the promotional strategy he later developed, in which he envisioned creating a small museum or tourist attraction on the property. Despite recurring conflicts with skeptics, Bent’s persistence helped keep the controversy alive for decades, embedding the Tucson artifacts firmly into the lore of Arizona’s archaeological past.

=== Latin inscriptions ===
The first object removed from the caliche by Manier was a crudely cast metal cross that weighed 62 pounds (28 kg); after cleaning it was revealed to be two separate crosses riveted together. After his find, Manier took the cross to Professor Frank H. Fowler, Head of the Department of Classical Languages of the University of Arizona, at Tucson, who determined the language on the artifacts was Latin. He also translated one line as reading "Calalus, the unknown land", giving a name for the supposed Latin colony. Fowler’s early assessment carried considerable weight because he was one of the few Latinists in the region, and local newspapers seized upon his initial comments without emphasizing his later reservations. The professor found the inscriptions oddly inconsistent—some phrases resembled classical Latin, while others appeared to be imprecise imitations that lacked proper grammar or syntax. Fowler also questioned the way the letters were engraved; the strokes were shallow and uniform, suggesting they may have been carved with modern tools rather than ancient ones. Despite his doubts, Fowler attempted to catalog the inscriptions systematically, hoping that clearer translations might provide clues about their origin. Over time, he became increasingly convinced that the engravings were copied piecemeal from Latin textbooks and widely available reference works, many of which were commonplace in school classrooms throughout the early twentieth century. His conclusion that the texts showed signs of plagiarism deeply frustrated believers, who accused him of academic bias. Fowler found himself unexpectedly pulled into the public controversy, receiving letters from both supporters and detractors of the artifacts’ authenticity. His efforts to step back from the debate only intensified speculation, and his early association with the find became a lasting part of the narrative surrounding the Tucson artifacts.

The Latin inscriptions on the alleged artifacts supposedly record the conflicts of the leaders of Calalus against a barbarian enemy known as the "Toltezus", which some have interpreted as a supposed reference to the Mesoamerican Toltec civilization. However, the Latin on the artifacts appears to either be badly inflected original Latin, or inscriptions brazenly plagiarized from Classical authors such as Virgil, Cicero, Livy, Cornelius Nepos, and Horace, among several others. This has led many experts to condemn the artifacts as frauds. What is perhaps most suspicious, however, is that most of the inscriptions are identical to what appeared in widely available Latin grammar books, like Harkness's Latin Grammar and Allen and Greenough's Latin Grammar, as well as dictionaries like The Standard Dictionary of Facts. Some researchers have pointed out that the narrative style on the artifacts resembles the sort of simplified Latin exercises found in school primers, where sentences are often adapted from famous authors but altered to illustrate specific grammatical points. This would explain why certain phrases match textbook examples almost word for word while others appear awkward or incorrect. The supposed references to the “Toltezus” also reveal misunderstandings of Mesoamerican history that were prevalent in nineteenth-century popular literature, suggesting that the forger was drawing from romanticized depictions rather than factual sources. Attempts to reconstruct the story told across the numerous inscriptions reveal a fragmented and inconsistent chronology, with repeated themes of exile, conflict, and divine protection that mimic tropes from adventure novels more than genuine Roman-era accounts. Linguists who studied line lengths and letter spacing concluded that many inscriptions were likely engraved by someone who was copying text directly in front of them, as the spacing abruptly changes at the edges of lines—something uncommon in ancient inscriptions but typical of amateur copying. Additionally, the use of certain Latin abbreviations mirrors conventions introduced in the 1800s rather than those used in antiquity. These accumulated discrepancies strengthened scholarly consensus that the inscriptions were modern fabrications rather than misunderstood historical documents.

== Views on authenticity ==
Manier took the first item to the Arizona State Museum to be studied by archaeologist Karl Ruppert. Ruppert was impressed with the item, and went with Manier to the site the next day where he found a caliche plaque weighing 7 pounds (3.2 kg), with inscriptions that included a date of 800 A.D. A total of thirty-one objects were found. Other contemporary scholars including George C. Valliant, a Harvard University archaeologist who visited the University of Arizona in 1928, and Bashford Dean, curator of arms and armor at the Metropolitan Museum of Art in New York City, thought the articles were fakes. Neil Merton Judd, curator of the National Museum at the Smithsonian Institution, happened to be in Tucson at the time of the discovery of the objects and, after examining them, also thought they were fakes, proposing that they may have been created by "some mentally incompetent individual with a flair for old Latin and the wars of antiquity."

=== Supporters ===
In the 1960s, Bent wrote a 350-page manuscript entitled "The Tucson Artifacts," about the objects, which is unpublished but kept by the Arizona State Museum. Both Manier and Bent were supporters of the objects as a genuine archaeological find.

Lara Coleman Ostrander, a Tucson immigrant and high school history teacher studied the historical background of the research, and translated the alleged history of Calalus from the writings on the items. Geologist Clifton J. Sarle worked with Ostrander to present the Tucson Artifacts to the press and the academic profession.

Tucson University administrator and director of the Arizona State Museum Dean Byron Cummings led archaeologists at the university to the location where the items were found. He brought ten of the objects to the American Association for the Advancement of Science and showing them at museums and universities on the east coast. Astronomer Andrew E. Douglass, known for his work in dendrochronology also considered the items to be authentic.

In 1975, Wake Forest University professor Cyclone Covey re-examined the controversy in his book titled Calalus: A Roman Jewish Colony in America from the Time of Charlemagne Through Alfred the Great. Covey was in direct contact with Thomas Bent by 1970, and planned to carry out excavations at the site in 1972, but was not allowed, due to legal complications preventing Wake Forest University from leading a dig at the site. Covey's book proposes that the objects are from a Jewish settlement, founded by people who came from Rome and settled outside of present-day Tucson around 800 AD.

=== Skeptics ===
Professor Frank Fowler originally translated the Latin inscriptions on the first items and found that the inscriptions were from well known classical authors such as Cicero, Virgil and Horace. He researched local Latin texts available in Tucson at the time and found the inscriptions on the lead items to be identical to the texts available.

Dean Cumming's student and excavator, Emil Haury, closely examined scratches on the surface of the objects as they were removed from the ground and concluded that they were planted, based partly on a cavity in the ground which was longer than a lead bar removed from it. After Cummings became president of the university, his views changed in an unclear manner, possibly due to Haury's skepticism, or the increasing sentiment that the items were nothing more than a hoax and as university president had to take a different stand on the matter. George M. B. Hawley staunchly opposed Bent's views about the objects. Hawley even accused Ostrander and Sarle as perpetrators of the hoax.

=== Possible creator ===
A local news article identified Timoteo Odohui as the possible creator of the items. Odohui was a young Mexican sculptor who lived near the site in the 1880s. The article mentions his possible connection to the site and his ability to craft lead objects. Bent wrote that a craftsman in the area had recalled the boy, his love for sculpture of soft metals and his collection of books on foreign languages, and told the excavators this.

== In popular culture ==
H. P. Lovecraft alludes to the Tucson artifacts in "The Mound," a short story ghost-written for Zealia Bishop. Archaeologist and Lovecraft scholar Marc A. Beherec also argues that the items influenced some of Lovecraft's other writings.

== See also ==
- Antillia
- Ironwood Forest National Monument
