= Duane W. Rimel =

American poet

- Rimel with his wife
- Born: February 21, 1915; Asotin, Washington, U.S.
- Died: September 30, 1996 (aged 81); Bainbridge Island, Washington, U.S.
- Resting place: Vineland Cemetery, Washington
- Occupation: Writer
- Writing career
- Pen name: Rex Weldon
- Years active: 1934–1990
- Genres: Erotic fiction; Fantasy; Horror fiction; weird fiction
- Notable work: "The Tree on the Hill"

Duane Weldon Rimel (February 21, 1915 – September 30, 1996) was an American writer of speculative and erotic literature who is best known for his friendship with H. P. Lovecraft.

== Life ==
Rimel was born to Pearl Guy Rimel and Florance F. (née Wilsey) Rimel on February 21, 1915, in Asotin, Washington. His father was a painter, while his mother worked as a secretary. In 1934, he graduated from Asotin High School.

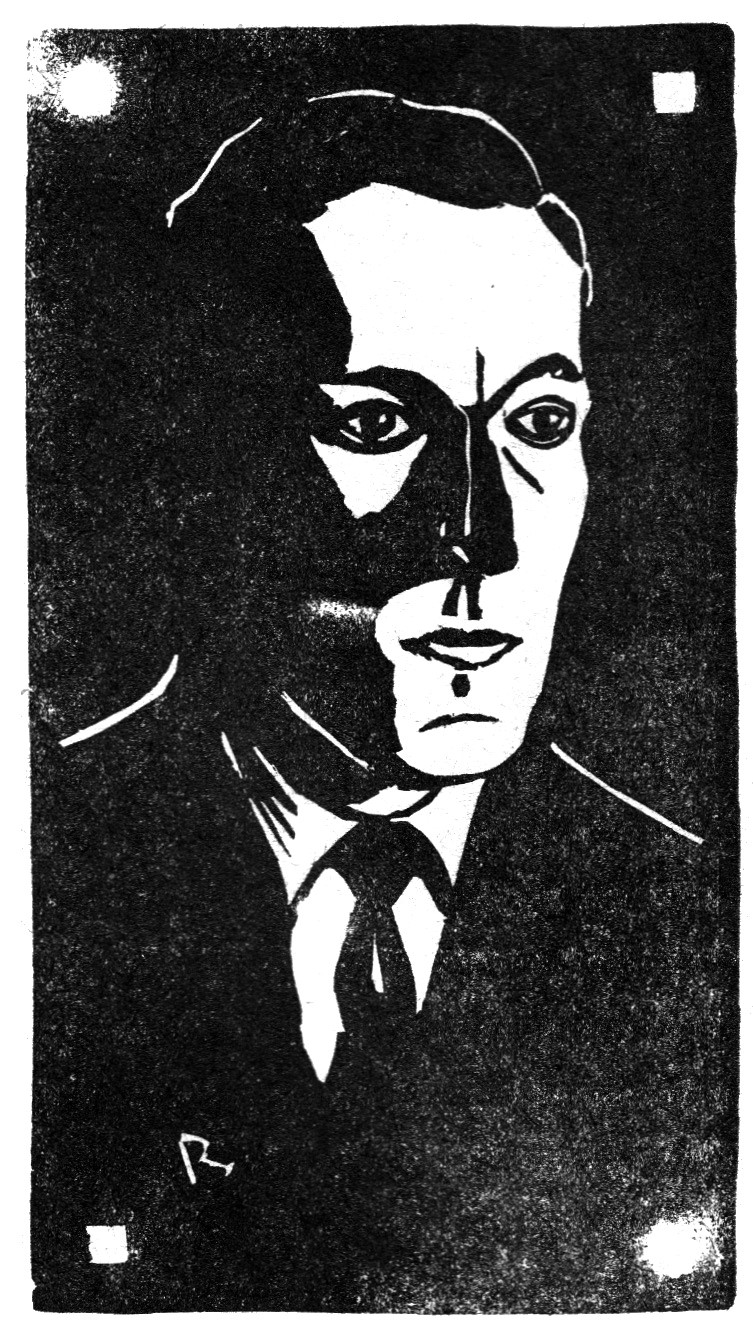
A linocut portrait of H. P. Lovecraft by Rimel

H. P. Lovecraft began corresponding with Rimel after becoming aware of him in 1933. The resulting correspondence continued until Lovecraft's death in 1937. He introduced Rimel to F. Lee Baldwin, another author and resident of Asotin, Washington. Lovecraft tutored Rimel in the writing of weird fiction by giving him advice and weird texts from his personal library. He sent Lovecraft some early manuscripts, including a now-lost work titled "The Spell of the Blue Stone" in February 1934. Lovecraft regarded this story as being "very remarkable for a beginner's work". Next, he sent "The Tree on the Hill", which Lovecraft edited. This story was later published in the 1940 issue of the fanzine Polaris. In the summer of that year, Rimel sent a poetic manuscript titled "The Dreams of Yid". Lovecraft altered the title to "The Dreams of Yith", as Rimel had not been aware that the term "yid" is an offensive term for a Jewish person. Clark Ashton Smith also contributed to the revision. The sonnets were published in two issues of the Fantasy Fan. Lovecraft, who was professionally revising stories for clients, did not charge Rimel for his revisions. Instead, he viewed Rimel as needing help in his formative period as a writer.

In the April 1935 issue of Julius Schwartz's Fantasy Magazine, contained a biographical sketch of H. P. Lovecraft by F. Lee Baldwin. This article was one of the first fanzine biographies of Lovecraft, preceding those written shortly after his death. Rimel contributed a linocut portrait of Lovecraft that he had made to illustrate the biography. In August 1937, Rimel discussed the idea of jointly founding a fanzine with Lovecraft and Emil Petaja titled the Fantaisiste's Mirror. Its goal would have been to complete the publication of Lovecraft's "Supernatural Horror in Literature" that was started in the defunct Fantasy Fan. This fanzine was never published.

The authors' final collaboration was a work called "The Disinterment", which was written in the summer of 1935. According to Lovecraft, he made "slight verbal changes" to the manuscript that Rimel had provided. Rimel later maintained that he had mostly written the story himself. However, S. T. Joshi, a Lovecraft scholar, has argued that the story was mostly written by Lovecraft, citing its stylistic similarities with "The Outsider" and Lovecraft's other early stories. Joshi also argues that Rimel never wrote anything as well-written or Lovecraftian again. After an initial rejection by Farnsworth Wright the story was accepted in July 1936. However, it was not published in Weird Tales until January 1937.

After Lovecraft's death, Rimel primarily shifted to writing Westerns and erotic literature. These stories were published under pseudonyms, such as Rex Weldon. In 1945, his first novel, Curse of Cain, was published by David McKay Publications in 1945. He also involved himself with the early development of the Lovecraft fandom in the 1940s. During this time, Rimel introduced Francis T. Laney to the fandom. They cofounded The Acolyte, an early Lovecraftian fanzine, with F. Lee Balswin in 1942. This fanzine became one of the central outlets in the early fandom. Starting in 1942, Rimel was also the editor of Valley News, a weekly newspaper that was based in Lewiston, Idaho. From 1953 to 1954, he served as a commissioner for the Asotin County Housing Authority. For the next two years, he was the president of the Musicians Union in the Lewiston Chapter of the AFL–CIO. Using the Rex Weldon pseudonym, he published Time Swap in 1969. This novel centers on time travel and sexuality. Rimel's writing career continued until 1990. He died of chronic bronchitis on September 30, 1996, in Bainbridge Island, Washington. Rimel was buried in Vineland Cemetery on October 3 in Clarkson, Washington.

== Personal life ==
Rimel married Ruth Adeline McClure on September 2, 1944, in Walla Walla, Washington. She died in 1995. They had four children, and one predeceased him. He was a member of the Benevolent and Protective Order of Elks Politically, he was a Democrat.
