= The Loved Dead =

- Short story by C. M. Eddy Jr.
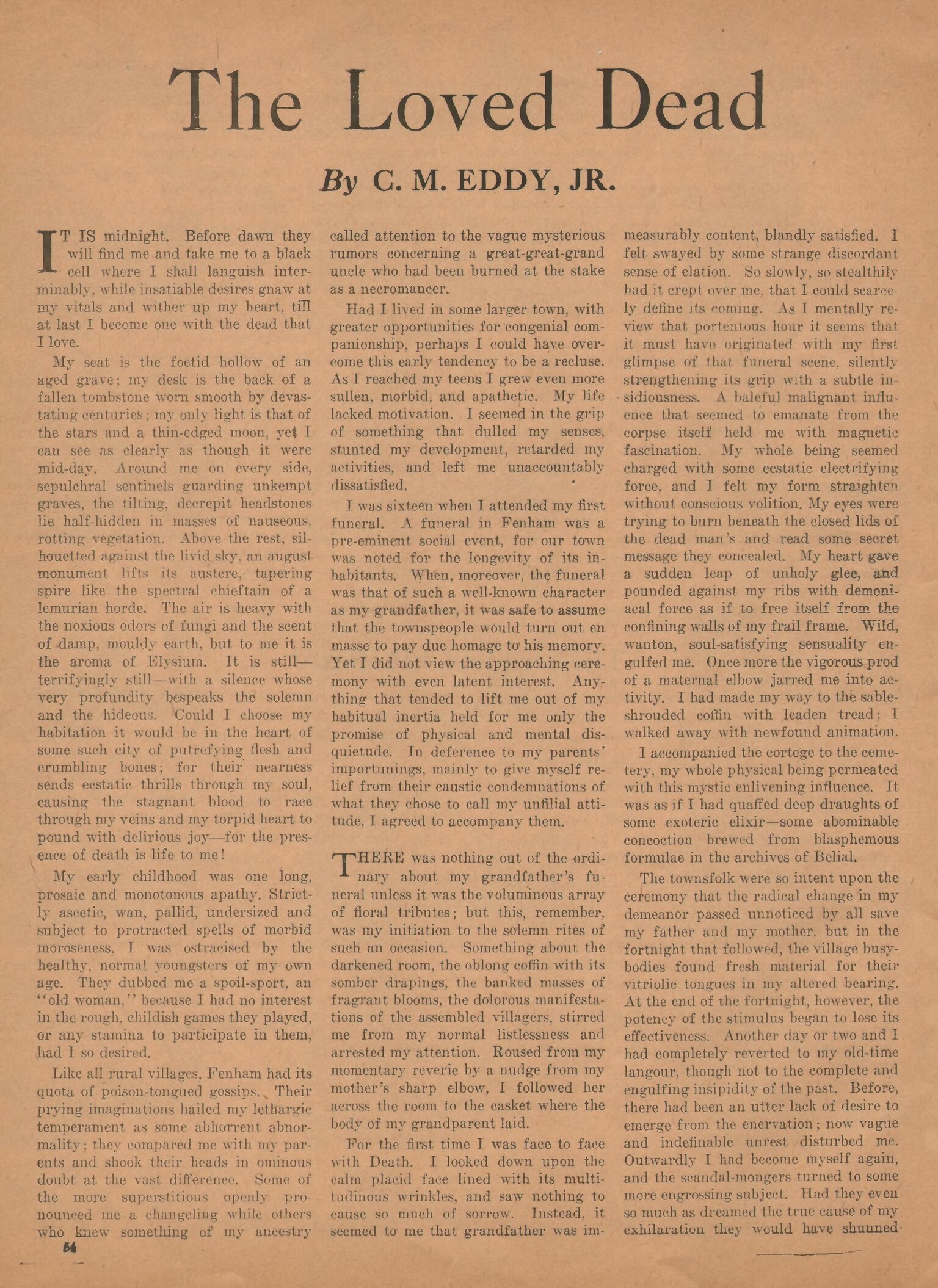
- Country: United States
- Language: English
- Genre: Horror short story

Publication
- Published in: Weird Tales
- Media type: Print
- Publication date: May 1924

The Loved Dead is a story written by C. M. Eddy Jr. in 1919. A controversial tale of necrophilia, it was published in Weird Tales bumper issue for May/July 1924.

== Plot ==
The plot revolves around an unnamed narrator living in the rural village of Fenham who is a necrophile. He describes his repressive childhood and what drove him to commit these crimes. He works for one mortuary/undertaker after another, in order to be near corpses. At the end of the story, with police hot on his trail, he commits suicide.

== Reaction ==
Due to the tale's grisly subject matter, style and descriptiveness, it caused a storm of controversy. According to Eddy, copies of Weird Tales had to be withdrawn from sale in many places. Robert Weinberg has disputed this, saying he was unable to find evidence of such withdrawals. On the other hand, S. T. Joshi contends that when published in Weird Tales, the story elicited a protest from authorities in Indiana, who sought to have the issue banned; subsequently, editor Farnsworth Wright became hesitant to accept any stories from H. P. Lovecraft that featured explicitly gruesome passages of the kind found in "The Loved Dead", and as a result several of Lovecraft's tales were rejected.

Ramsey Campbell wrote in 1969 that this story consisted of "ludicrous melodrama" and that it was a "distastefully sensationalist revision". He later modified this view in a revision of his 1969 article. Robert Weinberg described "The Loved Dead" as an "over-written and minor" story. John Pelan wrote, "This shuddery tale, for all its Grand Guignol excess, still strikes a chilling chord after many years and deserves its place as the best of 1924. One challenge in assembling this collection was to disregard the notoriety of certain tales and evaluate whether or not a story really deserved to be considered the 'best' of a given year. In the case of C. M. Eddy's story, it managed to be both."

== Publishing history ==
- Weird Tales, 4, No. 2 (May–June–July 1924), 54–57.
- Arkham Sampler (Summer 1948).
- First collected in The Dark Brotherhood and Other Pieces
- The Horror in the Museum and Other Revisions. Sauk City, WI: Arkham House, 1970, 348–57.
- The Loved Dead and Other Revisions New York: Carroll & Graf Publishers, 1997, 149–58.
- The Loved Dead and Other Tales by C. M. Eddy Jr. Rhode Island:Fenham Publishing, 2008, 1–15.
