= The Horror at Martin's Beach =

Short story by H. P. Lovecraft and Sonia H. Greene

- Short story by H. P. Lovecraft; Sonia H. Greene
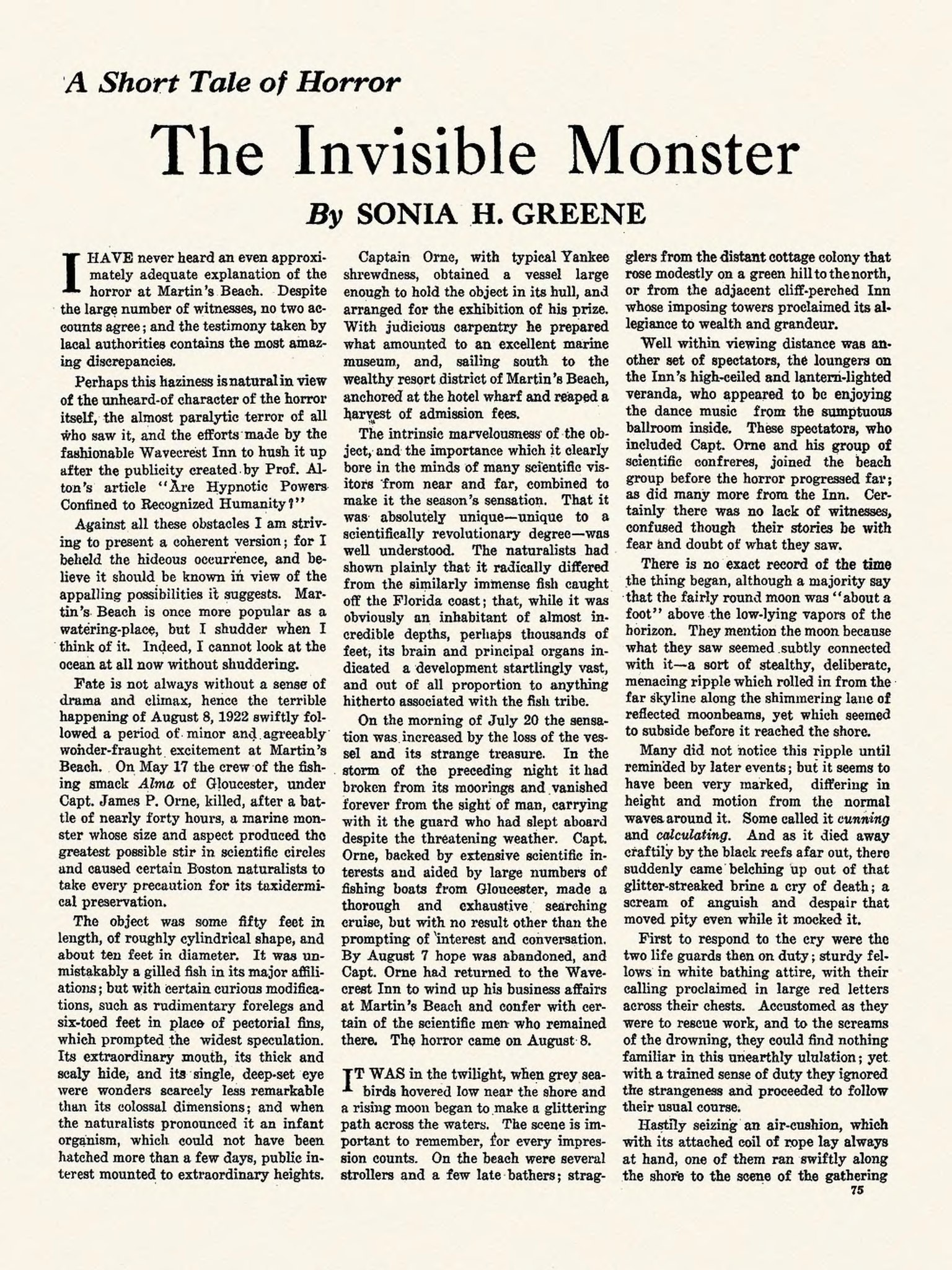

Text available at Wikisource
- Original title: The Invisible Monster
- Country: United States
- Language: English
- Genre: Horror

Publication
- Published in: Weird Tales
- Publication date: November 1923

"The Horror at Martin's Beach" is a short story by American writers H. P. Lovecraft and Sonia H. Greene. It was written in June 1922 and first published (as "The Invisible Monster") in November 1923 in Weird Tales (Vol. 2, No. 4, pages 75–76, 83).

== Plot ==
Sailors kill a 50-foot creature at sea after a lengthy battle. The creature bears strange anatomical irregularities such as a single large eye and rudimentary forelegs and six-toed feet in place of pectoral fins. After inspection by marine biologists, it is revealed to be just a juvenile. The captain who captured the creature tours the coast and profits from the corpse of the deceased creature. Some months later, the vessel with the creature breaks free from its moorings in a storm and disappears.

A few weeks later, as the captain attempts to finish his business at Martin's Beach, two lifeguards and other on the beach attempt to rescue something at sea, but are pulled in. The captain and others attempt to rescue the victims but it is too late. The rescuers and the captain are seemingly hypnotized and pulled into the water by the creature's apparently vengeful mother, to the horror of an onlooking crowd.

== Reprints ==
The story has been included in at least four collections of Lovecraft's works:

- Something About Cats and Other Pieces, Arkham House, 1949. Facsimile reprint by Books for Libraries Press, 1971.
- The Horror in the Museum and Other Revisions. Sauk City, WI: Arkham House, 1970 as "The Invisible Monster" by Sonia Greene
- The Horror in the Museum and Other Revisions. Edited by S. T. Joshi. Sauk City, WI: Arkham House, 1989, ISBN 0-87054-040-8, 325–30. As "The Horror at Martin's Beach" by Sonia H. Greene
- The Loved Dead and Other Revisions. New York: Carroll & Graf Publishers, 1997, ISBN 0-7867-0445-4, 125–30.
