= The Tree on the Hill =

Short story by H. P. Lovecraft and Duane W. Rimel

- Short story by H.P. Lovecraft, Duane W. Rimel
- Country: United States
- Language: English
- Genre: Horror

Publication
- Published in: Polaris
- Publication date: 1940

"The Tree on the Hill" is a short story written by horror author H. P. Lovecraft and his correspondent Duane W. Rimel. It was written in 1934 and published in 1940 in Polaris.

== Plot ==
The story is written from a first-person perspective. It depicts the narrator exploring the outskirts of a city called Hampden and finding a special tree atop an unusual hill. From the hill, the man witnesses the Bitterroot Mountains, a seemingly impossible feat of geography. The tree makes him daydream about a temple or tomb in a land with three red suns. The temple was half-violet, half-blue. Some shadows attract the narrator inside, where he sees three flaming eyes watching him from the darkness. He awakens later in a different location, with his clothing torn and dirty.

With his camera, the narrator takes multiple pictures of the tree and shows them to his friend Theunis. Later, they examine each photograph and notice three shadows projected by the tree, indicating that there were three suns causing them, as seen in the narrator's dream.

Theunis tells a story about a shadow or dark force which was repelled by an Egyptian priest, Ka-Nefer, during the Year of the Black Goat. He used a peculiar amber gem to divert the dark entity. Afterwards, Theunis uses a camera obscura, and a similar gem in his possession, to examine the photos taken earlier. Suddenly, something in the photo renders him unconscious. Upon awakening, Theunis instructs the narrator to burn the pictures and lock up the gem. He does as instructed, but glances at a drawing in the photograph made by Theunis. The narrator recoils in horror at the sight of a clawed hand, with tendrils, reaching for a spot in the grass where he received his vision.

== Connections ==
Theunis mentions that his story takes place during the Year of the Black Goat, probably a reference to Lovecraft's invented deity Shub-Niggurath. Theunis recurs in Rimel's story "The Jewels of Charlotte" (Unusual Stories, May–June 1935), which may also have been revised by Lovecraft.

== Reprints ==
The tale was republished in 2012 in Medusa's Coil and Others.
