= The Horror in the Museum =

Short story by H. P. Lovecraft

- Short story by H. P. Lovecraft
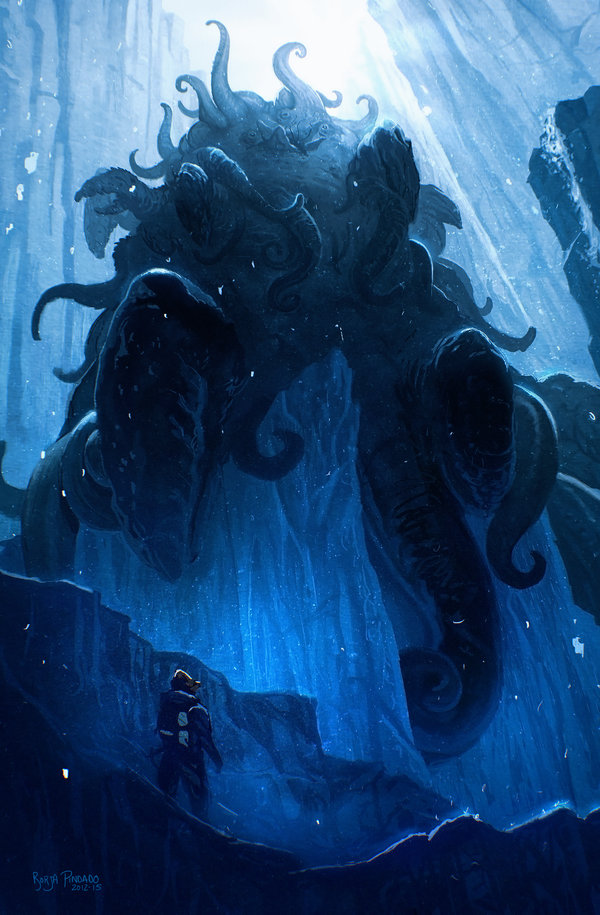
- Artwork by Borja Pindado influenced by "The Horror in the Museum".

Text available at Wikisource
- Country: United States
- Language: English
- Genre: Horror short story

Publication
- Published in: Weird Tales
- Media type: Print (magazine)
- Publication date: July 1933

"The Horror in the Museum" is a short story ghostwritten by H. P. Lovecraft for Somerville, Massachusetts, writer Hazel Heald in October 1932, published in Weird Tales in July 1933.

== Plot summary ==
George Rogers is the owner of a private wax museum specializing in the grotesque in Southwark, London after being dismissed from Madame Tussauds. A discussion with his acquaintance Stephen Jones starts cordially, but progressively degenerates as Jones first mocks the self-important Rogers, then comes to suspect that he is demented with his "wild tales and suggestions of rites and sacrifices to nameless elder gods". Jones takes up Rogers's challenge to spend a night in the museum.

In the evening, after some time and increasingly fearsome noises in the darkness, Jones is attacked by his host, but he manages to escape after a violent fight, and convinces himself that the supernatural aspects of the episode were just due to suggestion and nightmares about being tricked into sacrifice to a re-animated Rhan-Tegoth monster by a deluded Rogers.

Two weeks later, Jones has fully recovered and returns to the establishment. He finds here Rhan-Tegoth, the lastest Roger's wax work, out for exposition (although only within a restricted wing of the museum due to its extremely morbid outlook). The wax statue holds a mangled man, that Jones recognizes as Roger; and seems to also show traces of Jones' gunshots from their fight. The ghoulish Orabona implies that he found both the dead monster and his last victim Rogers in the morning, and that the statue is actually the result of preserving both bodies in wax.

== Authorship and publication ==
"The Horror in the Museum" is one of five stories Lovecraft "revised" for Heald. Heald had been introduced to Lovecraft by his friend Muriel E. Eddy (spouse of Clifford Martin Eddy Jr.). Starting in 1965, Lovecraft's letters were published, including one to Clark Ashton Smith on June 14, 1933, in which Lovecraft claimed that this story was mostly his own work: "Yes—the waxwork museum story is mostly my own; entirely so in wording, & also so far as concerns the background of Alaskan archaeology & antique horror. You will find Tsathoggua mentioned."

"The Horror in the Museum" was first published in volume 22, number 1 of Weird Tales in July 1933 (credited to Heald). The story has been reprinted in several collections, such as the inaugural edition of the Pan Book of Horror Stories (1959) and The Horror in the Museum and Other Revisions (1970). It was published in 2012 in Medusa's Coil and Others.
