= Hacienda Del Sol Guest Ranch Resort =

Historic hotel in Tucson, Arizona

Coordinates: 32°18′28″N 110°54′52″W

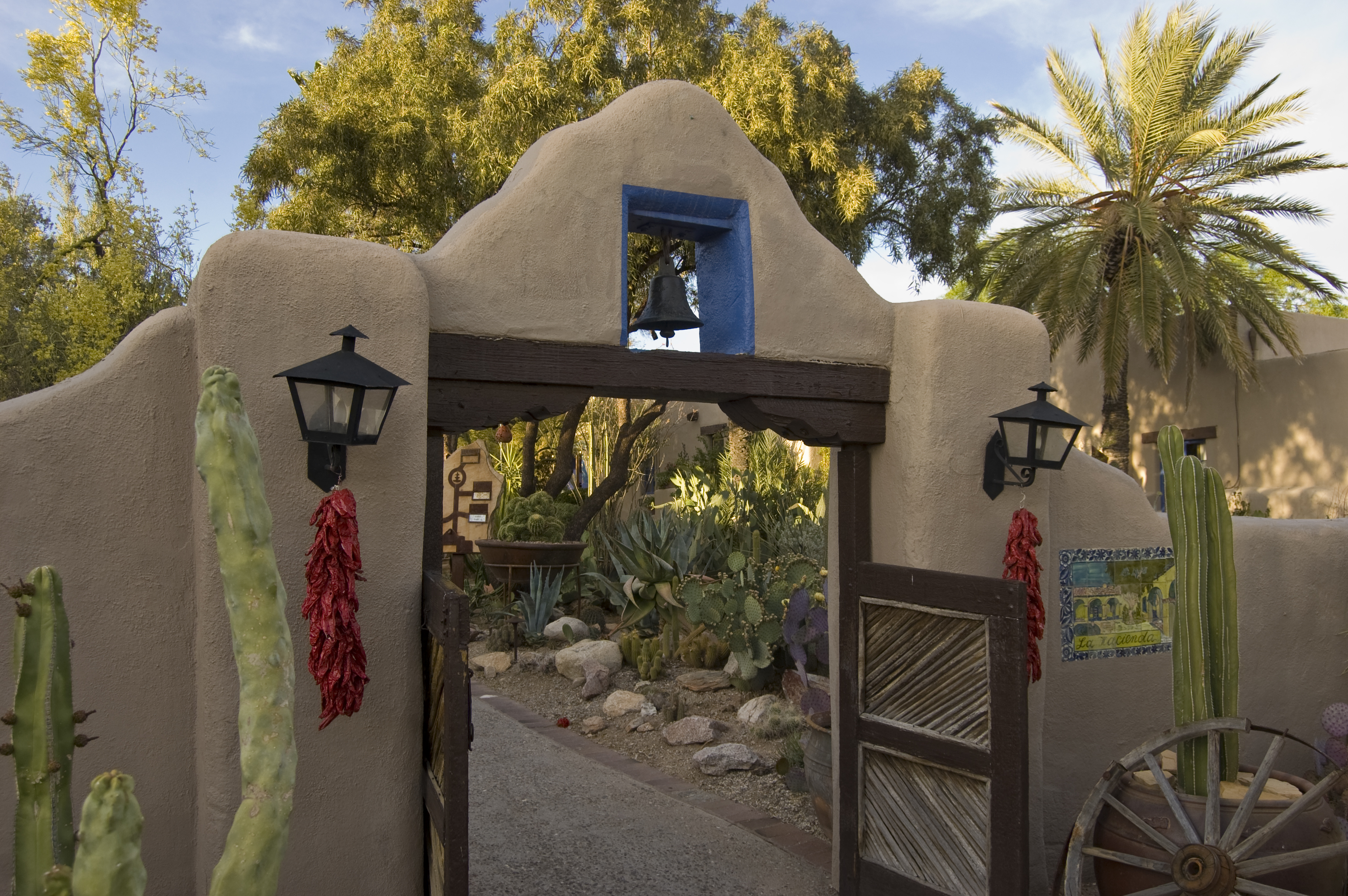
- Interactive map of the Hacienda Del Sol Guest Ranch Resort area
- Hotel chain: Preferred Hotels & Resorts

General information
- Opened: 1929
- Renovated: 1945

Website
- www.haciendadelsol.com

Hacienda Del Sol Guest Ranch Resort is a hotel in Catalina Foothills, near Tucson, Arizona. It began in 1929 as a private boarding school for girls. It was converted into a guest ranch after World War II.

== Origins as boarding school ==
The property was founded in 1929 by John and Helen Murphey as an Episcopal private boarding school. The school was built in the style of a Spanish colonial style ranch. The Murpheys had originally leased the land but purchased it in 1930 along with other acreage, giving them a total of 480 acres.

The school served girls between 12 and 18 years old and offered horseback riding and boarding for the girls' horses. Students included daughters and granddaughters of the country's wealthy families, including granddaughters of Woodrow Wilson and George Westinghouse and the daughter of Silsby Spalding. A brochure promoted the school to "girls who like to don chaps, sombrero and boots."

After a fire destroyed most of the buildings in 1938, much of the school was then rebuilt according to a design by architect Josias Joesler. Joesler's designs include oversized brick fireplaces, vast picture windows, and large, open common areas.

== Conversion to guest ranch ==
The school closed in 1942 due to World War II. In March 1945, John Murphey and Rev. George W. Ferguson sold the property to Mr. and Mrs. Howard Morgan for $110,000. The new owners announced plans to operate a desert resort hotel on the property, then consisting of 80 acres. By December 1945, the property was operating as the Hacienda del Sol Ranch Hotel. The same rooms previously used by students were converted into guest quarters.

In 1946, the ranch was used as a shooting location for Duel in the Sun starring Gregory Peck and Jennifer Jones. Guests of the ranch included Spencer Tracy, Katharine Hepburn, Clark Gable, Howard Hughes, Joseph Cotten, Waylon Jennings, and Jessi Colter.

== Later development ==
In 1970, the ranch was purchased by Robert Hartman for $260,000. It was next sold in 1983 for $3 million to Pointe Partners. The property then ended up under bank ownership after foreclosure by Standard Chartered Bank. In 1993, a group of investors led by Jed C. Paradies purchased the property from the bank for $1.6 million. In 1995, Paradies sold the property for $2.3 million to a group of local investors led by Jeffrey B. Timan and Richard Fink. The Timan/Fink group restored each of the 30 guest rooms, suites, and casitas. A new restaurant, The Grill, was added in 1997 and received several culinary awards.

In 2015, the resort added 32 new guest rooms, a swimming pool and spa, and an event space called Casa Luna.

It is one of only two surviving dude ranches in Tucson, where once there were 20 or so. It is a member of the Historic Hotels of America.

== See also ==
- White Stallion Ranch, also in Pima County, Arizona. The other surviving dude ranch, apparently, and also an HHA member.
