= Sonia Greene =

American businesswoman, amateur publisher, milliner, and one-time writer (1883-1972)

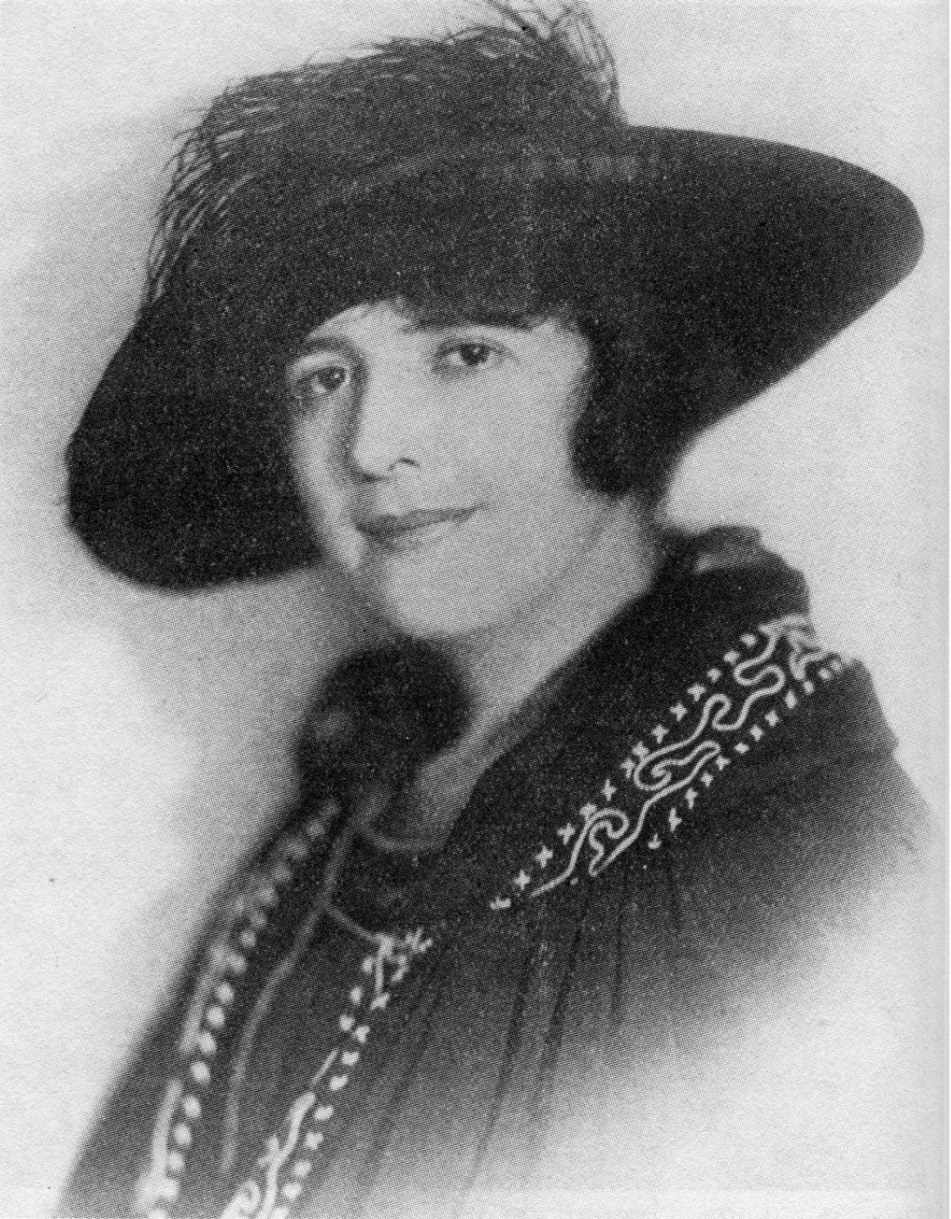
- Born: March 16, 1883; Ichnia, Russian Empire (present-day Ukraine)
- Died: December 26, 1972 (aged 89); Los Angeles, California, U.S.
- Occupations: Writer, publisher
- Spouses: Samuel Greene (m. 1899; died 1916) H. P. Lovecraft (m. 1924; died 1937) (Note: Greene and Lovecraft separated in the early 1930s, but their divorce was never legally finalized.) Nathaniel Davis (m. 1936; died 1946)
- Children: 2
- Writing career
- Language: English
- Genre: Pulp fiction

Sonia Haft Greene Lovecraft Davis (March 16, 1883 – December 26, 1972) was an American one-time pulp fiction writer and amateur publisher, businesswoman, and milliner who bankrolled several fanzines in the early twentieth century. She is noted for her thirteen-year marriage to American weird fiction writer H. P. Lovecraft. She was a president of the United Amateur Press Association.

== Life and work ==
Some of Greene's biographical details are unclear – she was born as either Sonia Haft Shafirkin or as Sonia Shaferkin Haft, in either Ichnia, Ukraine, Russian Empire or Konotop, Chernigov Province, to Simyon and Racille (Haft) Shafirkin. She came from a Jewish family. Her father apparently died when she was a child in 1888, and her mother emigrated to the United States, leaving Sonia and her brother in Liverpool at the Baron Maurice de Hirsch School. Sonia joined her mother in the United States in 1892, after her mother remarried to a shopkeeper named Samuel Morris.

At the age of sixteen, on December 24, 1899, Sonia married Samuel Greene, a Russian born Samuel Seckendorff, who was ten years her senior. The following year she gave birth to a son, who died at three months of age. Her daughter, Florence Carol (later Carol Weld) was born on March 19, 1903. According to Lovecraft's correspondent Alfred Galpin, Samuel Greene was "a man of brutal character". The marriage was turbulent, and Samuel Greene died in 1916, apparently by his own hand.

Greene was independently middle class, unusual for women of that time. She worked as a milliner at a department store and traveled frequently for her job. Her salary enabled her to rent a house for herself and her daughter in Flatbush, Brooklyn, which at the time was an affluent suburb. She donated money to several amateur press publications, and traveled to amateur press conventions.

Greene's daughter Florence became a successful journalist under the name of Carol Weld. The two women had a tense relationship, and were eventually estranged. Greene did not mention her daughter in her volume, The Private Life of H. P. Lovecraft, an autobiographical work which details only the period of her relationship and marriage with Lovecraft.

=== Relationship with H. P. Lovecraft ===
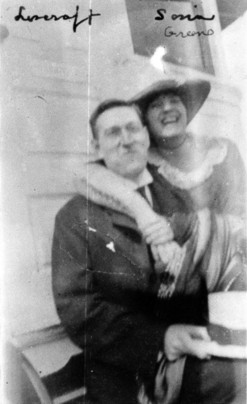
Lovecraft and Sonia Greene on July 5, 1921

Greene met Howard P. Lovecraft in 1921 at an amateur press convention in Boston. She had been introduced to the world of amateur journalism four years earlier by Lovecraft's colleague James Ferdinand Morton Jr. The October after meeting him, she issued The Rainbow, a fanzine described by Rheinhardt Kleiner as "a large and handsome affair, illustrated with half-tone reproductions of photographs of well-known amateurs of the day and containing excellent contributions by many of them." Lovecraft reviewed Greene's magazine at some length in The National Amateur (March 1922). A facsimile edition of the magazine was issued by Necronomicon Press in 1977.

Greene's best-known story is "The Horror at Martin's Beach," revised and edited by Lovecraft and retitled as The Invisible Monster when published in Weird Tales (November 1923). Lovecraft completed his story "Under the Pyramids" in February 1924, but lost his typescript of the story at Union Station in Providence, Rhode Island when he was on his way to New York to marry Greene, who helped him for most of their honeymoon in Philadelphia retyping the manuscript.

Greene also penned the story "Four O'Clock" (suggested by Lovecraft, but not revised by him) which was first printed in Something About Cats and Other Pieces, a collection that also includes "The Invisible Monster" and her memoir "Lovecraft as I Knew Him".

After their marriage in St. Paul's Chapel in Manhattan on March 3, 1924 (Greene was then aged 40 and Lovecraft 33), Greene and Lovecraft relocated to Brooklyn and moved into her apartment. Soon the couple were facing financial difficulties. Greene lost her hat shop and suffered poor health conditions. Lovecraft could not find work to support them both, so his wife moved to Cleveland for employment. Lovecraft lived by himself in the Red Hook neighborhood of Brooklyn and came to dislike New York life intensely. Meanwhile, Greene lived on the road, traveling for her job. She sent Lovecraft a weekly allowance that helped him pay for a tiny apartment in the then-working class Brooklyn Heights. Greene slept there one or two days out of the month. During this time, Lovecraft claimed in letters that he was so poor that he lived for three days on one loaf of bread, one can of cold beans, and a hunk of cheese. A few years later, Lovecraft (who had returned to live in Providence, Rhode Island) and his wife, still living separately, agreed to an amicable divorce, which was never fully completed.

In the 1930s, Greene wrote a play called Alcestis, the Prologue for which was written in Lovecraft's hand. It was unpublished until the mid-1980s, when it was issued in a facsimile holograph edition of 200 copies by R. Alain Everts' The Strange Company as by H. P. Lovecraft and Sonia Greene. Lovecraft scholar S. T. Joshi, however, considers that the play is likely entirely Greene's work. The manuscript of Alcestis is among Greene's papers at the John Hay Library.

=== Later years ===
After her marriage to Lovecraft ended, in 1933, Greene moved to California. In 1936, she married Dr. Nathaniel Abraham Davis from Los Angeles. She was unaware of Lovecraft's passing until 1945, eight years after his death. Her marriage to Lovecraft was not dissolved—he assured her the divorce had been filed, but failed to sign the final decree, so Greene's union with Davis was technically bigamous. Greene was informed of this late in life and it disturbed her considerably. Her third husband died in 1946.

Greene later resided at Diana Lynn Lodge, a home for the elderly which is still in operation in Sunland-Tujunga, Los Angeles, and died there on December 26, 1972, at age 89.

== Works ==
=== Poems ===
- "To Florence"
- "Mors Omnibus Comunis (Written in a Hospital)". In The Rainbow 1, No 1 (Oct 1921). Facsimile ed, Necronomicon Press, 1977.

=== Stories ===
- "The Horror at Martin's Beach". Revised by H. P. Lovecraft and published (as "The Invisible Monster") in Weird Tales November 1969)
- "Four O'Clock" Written in 1922 (not published until 1949 in Something About Cats and Other Pieces).

=== Plays ===
- Alcestis (not published until 1985 by R. Alain Everts' The Strange Company, 200 copies only).

=== Memoir ===
- The Private Life of H. P. Lovecraft (written under the name Sonia H. Davis)

=== Essays/editorials ===
From The Rainbow:

- "Amateurdom and the Editor"
- "Recruiting"
- "Opinion"
- "Commercialism"
- "Amateur Aphorisms"
- "A Game of Chess"
- "Heins versus Houtain"

From The Oracle:

- "Fact vs. Opinion" (an editorial against censoring pornography)

=== Editor/investor ===
- The Organ of the United Amateur Press Association (amateur publication/fanzine)
- The Rainbow (amateur publication/fanzine)

== Sources ==
- The Private Life of H. P. Lovecraft, by Sonia Greene (Necronomicon Press, 1985, 1992) (ISBN 0-318047-18-7). Italian translation: Vita privata di H. P. Lovecraft : documenti e testimonianze per una biografia Sonia Davis, Fritz Leiber, Samuel Loveman e altri ; traduzione e cura di Claudio De Nardi.Trento : Reverdito Editore, c1987.
- H. P. Lovecraft: A Life, by S. T. Joshi (Necronomicon Press, 1996) (ISBN 0-940884-88-7)
- L. Sprague de Camp. "Sonia and HPL" in Wilfred B. Talman, The Normal Lovecraft. Saddle River, NJ: Gerry de la Ree, 1973.
- Gerry de la Ree. "When Sonia Sizzled" in Wilfred B. Talman, The Normal Lovecraft. Saddle River, NJ: Gerry de la Ree, 1973.
