= Picture Rocks, Arizona =

CDP in Pima County, Arizona

- CDP
- Location in Pima County and the state of Arizona

- Location in the United States
- Coordinates: 32°19′51″N 111°13′47″W
- Country: United States
- State: Arizona
- County: Pima

Area
  - Total: 70.86 sq mi (183.52 km^{2})
  - Land: 70.85 sq mi (183.49 km^{2})
  - Water: 0.012 sq mi (0.03 km^{2})
- Elevation: 2,080 ft (634 m)

Population (2020)
  - Total: 9,551
  - Density: 134.8/sq mi (52.05/km^{2})
- Time zone: UTC-7 (MST (no DST))
- FIPS code: 04-55300
- GNIS feature ID: 1866990

Picture Rocks is a census-designated place (CDP) in Pima County, Arizona, United States, home of the Tucson artifacts. The population was 9,551 at the 2020 United States census.

== Geography ==
Picture Rocks is located at 32°19′51″N 111°13′47″W (32.330735, -111.229652).

According to the United States Census Bureau, the CDP has a total area of 55.6 sq mi (144 km^{2}), of which 55.6 sq mi (144 km^{2}) is land and 0.1 sq mi (0.26 km^{2}) (0.09%) is water.

== Demographics ==
Historical population
Census	Pop.	Note	%±
2020	9,551		—
U.S. Decennial Census

=== 2020 census ===
As of the 2020 census, Picture Rocks had a population of 9,551. The median age was 49.5 years. 19.5% of residents were under the age of 18 and 22.8% of residents were 65 years of age or older. For every 100 females there were 105.7 males, and for every 100 females age 18 and over there were 104.2 males age 18 and over.

0.0% of residents lived in urban areas, while 100.0% lived in rural areas.

There were 3,868 households in Picture Rocks, of which 23.3% had children under the age of 18 living in them. Of all households, 46.7% were married-couple households, 22.8% were households with a male householder and no spouse or partner present, and 22.2% were households with a female householder and no spouse or partner present. About 27.3% of all households were made up of individuals and 12.8% had someone living alone who was 65 years of age or older.

There were 4,299 housing units, of which 10.0% were vacant. The homeowner vacancy rate was 1.6% and the rental vacancy rate was 5.4%.

Racial composition as of the 2020 census
Race	Number	Percent
White	7,705	80.7%
Black or African American	47	0.5%
American Indian and Alaska Native	119	1.2%
Asian	70	0.7%
Native Hawaiian and Other Pacific Islander	14	0.1%
Some other race	503	5.3%
Two or more races	1,093	11.4%
Hispanic or Latino (of any race)	1,679	17.6%

=== 2000 census ===
At the 2000 census there were 8,139 people and 2,883 households residing in the CDP. The population density was 146.4 inhabitants per square mile (56.5/km^{2}). There were 3,088 housing units at an average density of 55.6/sq mi (21.5/km^{2}). The racial makeup of the CDP was 89.6% White, 0.6% Black or African American, 1.4% Native American, 0.4% Asian, 0.1% Pacific Islander, 5.4% from other races, and 2.6% from two or more races. 13.8% of the population were Hispanic or Latino of any race.

Of the 2,883 households 38.6% had children under the age of 18 living with them, 59.2% were married couples living together, 10.6% had a female householder with no husband present, and 24.3% were non-families. 18.4% of households were one person and 4.2% were one person aged 65 or older. The average household size was 2.82 and the average family size was 3.20.

The age distribution was 30.0% under the age of 18, 6.3% from 18 to 24, 31.3% from 25 to 44, 24.5% from 45 to 64, and 7.9% 65 or older. The median age was 36 years. For every 100 females, there were 102.6 males. For every 100 females age 18 and over, there were 99.8 males.

The median household income was $39,534 and the median family income was $43,026. Males had a median income of $30,752 versus $21,513 for females. The per capita income for the CDP was $17,132. About 4.3% of families and 7.5% of the population were below the poverty line, including 10.9% of those under age 18 and 1.8% of those age 65 or over.

== Education ==
It is in the Marana Unified School District.
