= The Crawling Chaos =

1921 horror short story

- Short story by H. P. Lovecraft and Winifred V. Jackson

Text available at Wikisource
- Country: United States
- Language: English
- Genre: Horror fiction

Publication
- Published in: United Cooperative
- Publication type: Periodical
- Media type: Print (magazine)
- Publication date: April 1921
- Pages: 4

Chronology
The Green Meadow	Nyarlathotep

"The Crawling Chaos" is a short story by American writers H. P. Lovecraft and Winifred V. Jackson, first published April 1921 in the United Cooperative. As in their other collaboration, "The Green Meadow", the tale was credited to "Elizabeth Berkeley" (Jackson) and "Lewis Theobald, Jun" (Lovecraft). Lovecraft wrote the entire text, but Jackson is also credited since the story was based on a dream she experienced.

Despite the title's similarity to the character's epithet, Lovecraft's monster Nyarlathotep does not appear in this story.

== Plot ==
The story begins with the narrator describing the effects of opium and the fantastical vistas it can inspire. The narrator then tells of his sole experience with opium in which a doctor accidentally administered him an overdose during the "year of the plague".

After a disembodied sensation of falling, the narrator finds himself in a strange, beautiful room containing exotic furniture. A pounding sound from the outside inspires an inexplicable sense of dread in the narrator. Determined to identify the origin of this sound, the narrator moves towards a window and observes a terrifying scene of fifty-foot waves and a seething vortex consuming the shoreline at an incredible rate.

Sensing imminent danger, the narrator quickly exits the building. Fleeing the waves, he travels inland. He eventually arrives in a valley with tropical grass extending above his head and a great palm tree in the center. Driven by curiosity despite his fear, he crawls on his hands and knees toward the great palm.

Soon after arriving at the tree, the narrator observes an angelic child fall from its branches. The child then smiles and extends its hand toward the narrator, and the narrator hears ethereal singing within the upper air, followed by the child saying in an otherworldly voice:

It is the end. They have come down through the gloaming from the stars. Now all is over, and beyond the Arinurian streams, we shall dwell blissfully in Teloe.

As the child speaks, the narrator observes two youths emerging from the leaves of the tree. They take the narrator by the hand and describe the worlds of "Teloe" and "Cytharion of the Seven Suns" which lie beyond the Milky Way.

As they speak, the narrator observes that he is floating in the upper atmosphere, with the palm tree far below, and now accompanied by an increasing number of singing, vine-crowned youths. As they ascend, the child tells the narrator that he must always look upward and never down at the earth below.

As he rises further, listening to the youths singing, the narrator is disturbed by the return of the sound of the waves. Forgetting what the child said, he looks downward and observes a sight of global destruction, with the waves consuming the cities until nothing is left. This is followed by the waters draining into the Earth's core via an opening gulf, which causes the Earth to explode.

== Reprints ==
The tale was published in Beyond the Wall of Sleep. The corrected text is collected in Lovecraft's revisions volume The Horror in the Museum and Other Revisions (Arkham House, 1970). It was republished in 2012 in The Crawling Chaos and Others.
