= Zealia Bishop =

American writer

- Zealia Bishop c.1953
- Born: June 4, 1897
- Died: June 29, 1968 (aged 71)
- Occupation: Writer
- Spouse: D. W. Bishop
- Writing career
- Genres: Horror, fantasy

Zealia Brown-Reed Bishop (1897–1968) was an American writer of short stories. Her name is sometimes spelled "Zelia". Although she mostly wrote romantic fiction, she is remembered for three short horror stories she wrote in collaboration with H. P. Lovecraft.

== Life ==
Zealia Margaret Caroline Brown was born in 1897 in Asheville, North Carolina to Willard Filmore Brown and his wife Sallie Willie Haslett. Through her mother she was a descendant of William the Conqueror, as was Lovecraft.

She had a sister and a brother. She was educated at Loretto Academy.

She was married to James P. Reed (1891–1935) and gave birth to a son. Bishop and Reed divorced in the 1920s.

After divorcing, Bishop lived in Cleveland, Ohio working as a court reporter and studying journalism at Columbia. She also wrote articles and stories to supplement her income. She felt the need to improve her writing, and through Samuel Loveman she was put into contact with Lovecraft. Lovecraft helped Bishop revise her stories and they corresponded frequently. Bishop would later marry Dauthard William Bishop Sr., with whom she would live in Kansas City. While there she took an active role in the National Federation of Press Women, the New England Historic Genealogical Society and the Missouri Women's Press Club. She authored a historical series about Clay County, Missouri.

== Works ==
Among her works are three horror stories she wrote in collaboration with H. P. Lovecraft ("The Curse of Yig", "Medusa's Coil", and The Mound). Her stories appeared in the magazine Weird Tales.

The Mound and The Curse of Yig were based on local stories she learnt while visiting her sister's farm in Oklahoma. It is believed that The Mound is likely modeled after the Ghost Mound in Caddo County, Oklahoma or possibly Dead Woman's Mound near Binger.

Arkham House published her volume The Curse of Yig (1953) which contains the three horror stories by Bishop and Lovecraft, as well as two profiles by Bishop, one about Lovecraft and the other about August Derleth. Lovecraft's profile has been reprinted in Peter Cannon's collection of essays on Lovecraft, Lovecraft Remembered. The three Lovecraft-Bishop revision stories also appear in The Horror in the Museum and Other Revisions.

Bishop's preference was for romantic fiction, which most of her published works were.

== Letters from Lovecraft ==
In 2014, a hitherto unknown and unpublished cache of thirty-six letters from Lovecraft to Bishop was discovered. The letters had once been kept in a trunk with her manuscripts at the home of Jeanette Starkweather Cole, with whom Zealia had moved in after the death of her husband D. W. Bishop in 1956. The trunk was initially bequeathed to their daughter, Etha Charmaine Cole McCall Fowler (Zealia's great niece). Her son, Sean McCall, found the letters following Mrs. Fowler's death in 2014. A large manila envelope holding the letters was from Lovecraft's friend and collaborator, August Derleth, posted in August 1937. The envelope may have been used to return manuscripts of letters which Zealia had sent him following Lovecraft's death. The letters have now been published, with additional illustrative material, by the H. P. Lovecraft Historical Society.
