= The Curse of Yig =

Short story by H. P. Lovecraft and Zealia Bishop

- Short story by H. P. Lovecraft; Zealia Bishop
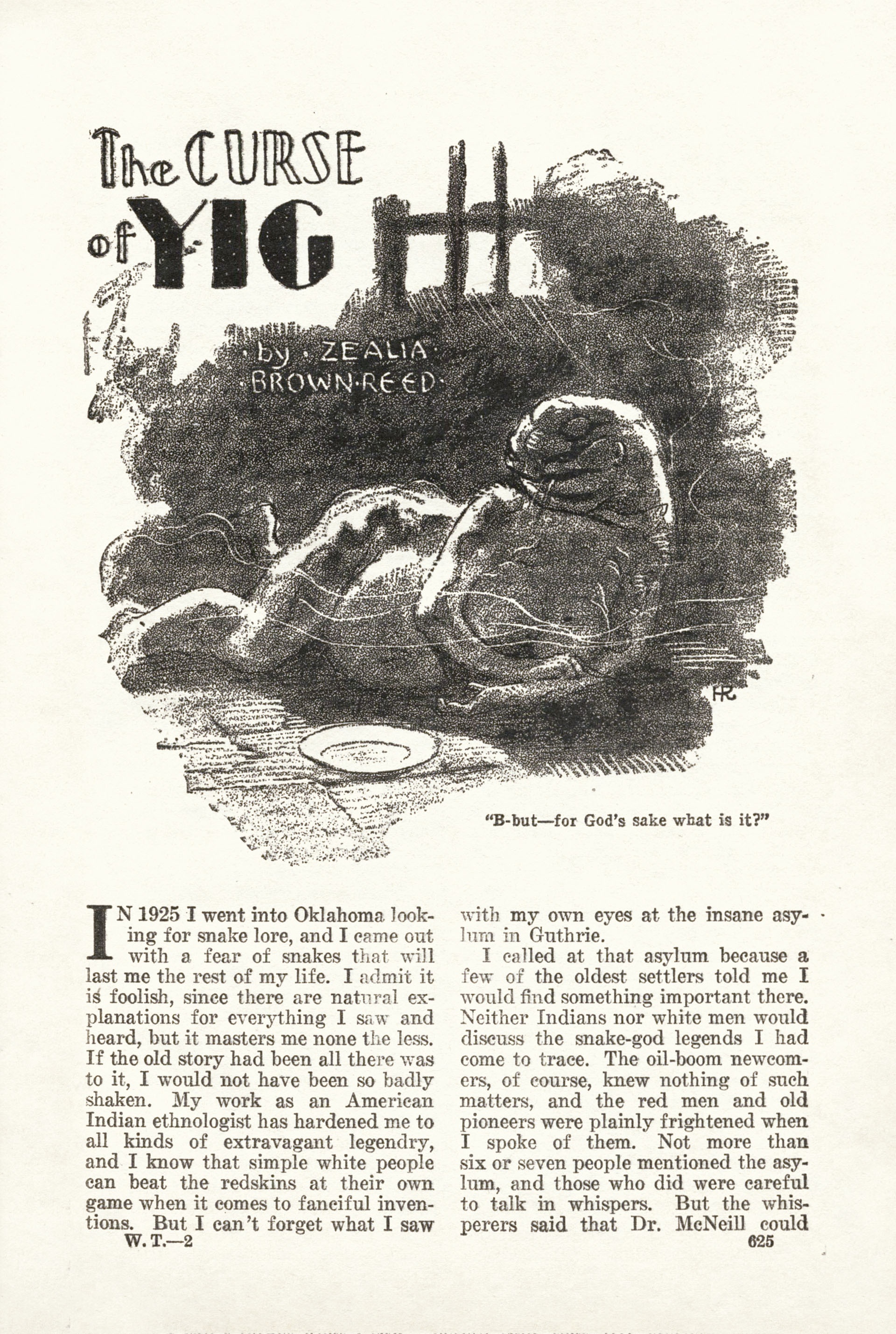
- Title page of "The Curse of Yig" as it appeared in Weird Tales, November 1929. Illustration by Hugh Rankin.

Text available at Wikisource
- Country: United States
- Language: English

Publication
- Published in: Weird Tales
- Publication type: Periodical
- Media type: Print (magazine)
- Publication date: November 1929

"The Curse of Yig" is a 1929 short story co-written by H. P. Lovecraft and Zealia Bishop that introduces Yig, "The Father of Serpents".

== Plot ==
In 1889, a couple arriving in Oklahoma learn about local legends of a "snake god" called Yig. According to the legends, Yig takes vengeance on anyone who kills a serpent, either by killing them or turning them into a half-snake monster. The husband, who has intense fear of snakes, is horrified when his wife kills a nest of rattlesnakes at one of their campsites, fearing Yig's vengeance. After building their cabin, the husband insists on practicing various rituals from the native tribes to ward off Yig, which irritates his wife. One night, the woman, in fear, mistakes her husband for Yig and kills him. She is then taken to an asylum, where she dies after giving birth to four half-snake creatures.

== Background ==
Bishop provided the story idea and some notes, and paid Lovecraft to flesh it out in 1928. Bishop then sold the story under her own name to Weird Tales magazine. It was first published in the November 1929 issue (volume 14, number 5) on pages 625–36.

It was the first of three tales Lovecraft wrote with Bishop; the others were The Mound and Medusa's Coil.

== Republication ==
The story has appeared in a number of horror anthologies, including:

- A Treasury of American Horror Stories, ed. Frank D. McSherry, Jr., Charles G. Waugh & Martin H. Greenberg, Bonanza/Crown Books 1985, ISBN 0-517-48075-1
- Tales of the Dark #3, ed. Lincoln Child, St. Martin's Press 1988 ISBN 0-312-90539-4
- The Horror in the Museum and Other Revisions, H. P. Lovecraft, Arkham House 1989 ISBN 0-87054-040-8
- Lovecraft, H. P. (2012). Joshi, S. T. (ed.). The Crawling Chaos and Others. Welches, OR: Arcane Wisdom. ISBN 9781935006152.
