= The Green Meadow =

Short story by H. P. Lovecraft (c. 1918)

- Short story by H. P. Lovecraft; Winifred V. Jackson

Text available at Wikisource
- Country: United States
- Language: English

Publication
- Published in: Beyond the Wall of Sleep
- Publication date: 1927

"The Green Meadow" is a short story by H. P. Lovecraft and Winifred V. Jackson written in 1918/1919 and published in the spring 1927 issue of The Vagrant. As in their other collaboration, "The Crawling Chaos", both authors used pseudonyms—the tale was published as by "Elizabeth Neville Berkeley" (Jackson) and "Lewis Theobald, Jun." (Lovecraft). Lovecraft wrote the entire text but Jackson is credited since it was based on a dream she had experienced.

== Plot ==
In 1913, near the (fictional) seaside village of Potowonket, Maine, a meteorite crashes into the sea. A fishing vessel hauls in the meteor, and scientists soon examine it. Within the meteor is a small notebook, made of some indestructible material and written in classical Greek. The notebook is the first-person account of a man trapped on a small, disintegrating island who seems threatened by shadowy forces and ultimately discovers Stethelos, a city from Lovecraft's Dream Cycle Mythos.

== Connections ==
The city Stethelos is also mentioned in the short story "The Quest of Iranon".

== Reprints ==
The tale was published in Beyond the Wall of Sleep (Arkham House, 1943). The corrected text is collected in Lovecraft's revisions volume The Horror in the Museum and Other Revisions (Arkham House, 1970). It was republished in 2012 in The Crawling Chaos and Others.
