= Hazel Heald =

American writer

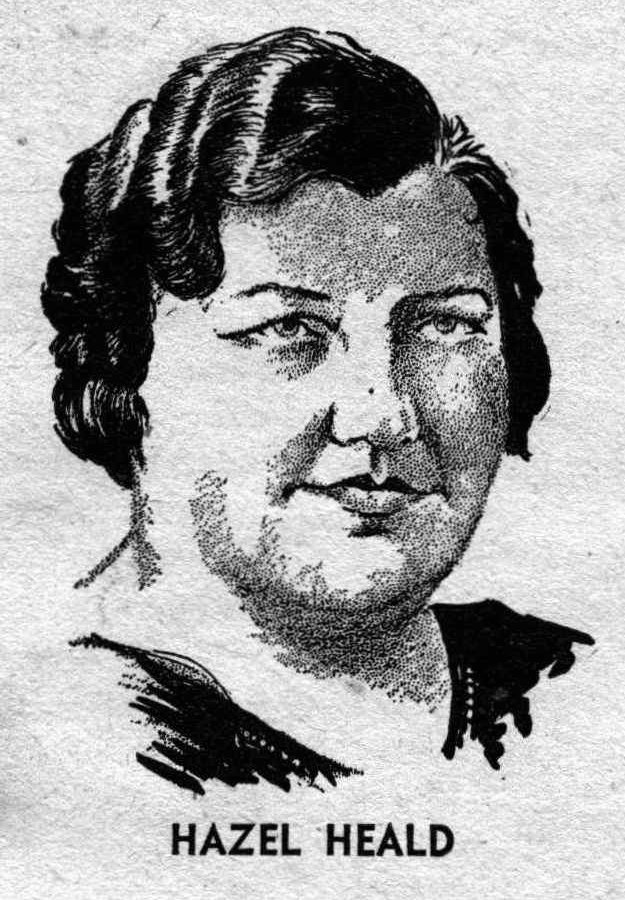
Hazel Heald c. 1932

Hazel Heald (April 6, 1896 – February 4, 1961) was a pulp fiction writer who lived in Somerville, Massachusetts. She is known for collaborating with American horror fiction writer H. P. Lovecraft.

== Biography ==
Heald was born the daughter of William W. Heald and Oraetta J. Drake in 1896. She is buried at Lakeview Cemetery in Maine.

== Collaborations ==
- "The Man of Stone" (1932)
- "The Horror in the Burying-Ground" (1933)
- "The Horror in the Museum" (1933)
- "Winged Death" (1934). "My share in it is something like 90 to 95%", wrote Lovecraft to August Derleth, of this over-the-top comic-horror story.
- "Out of the Aeons" (1935)
