= C. M. Eddy Jr. =

American writer (1896–1967)

Clifford M. Eddy Jr.
- Born: January 18, 1896; Providence, Rhode Island, U.S.
- Died: November 21, 1967 (aged 71); Providence, Rhode Island, U.S.
- Resting place: Swan Point Cemetery
- Occupation: Author
- Spouse: Muriel E. Eddy
- Writing career
- Pen name: C. M. Eddy Jr.
- Genres: Horror, science fiction

Clifford Martin Eddy Jr. (C. M. Eddy Jr.; January 18, 1896 – November 21, 1967) was an American writer known for his horror, mystery and supernatural short stories. He is best remembered for his work in Weird Tales magazine and his friendship with H. P. Lovecraft.

== Career ==
Eddy was born in Providence, Rhode Island, on January 18, 1896. He went to Classical High School in Providence, and as a child was a precocious reader and writer. He continued to be an avid reader and writer, interested in mythology and the occult. According to his wife Muriel,

Cliff was always interested in the idea of parallel planes—where life on another level, either astral or otherwise, would be similar to that on earth—or where life might exist, but in another time or another form. He was also fascinated by the themes of teleportation, vampirism, ghosts and the mystery of unexplained phenomena...he spent hours in the library researching the unusual, the unique, the bizarre.

=== Horror writer ===
He began his career writing short stories for a broad range of pulp fiction magazines such as Weird Tales, Munsey's Magazine, and Snappy Stories. His first published tale, "Sign of the Dragon" (Mystery Magazine, 1919), was a detective story. (In October 2012 it was released as a standalone e-book.)

Various tales of mystery, ghosts, and song-writing (he himself wrote songs, including "When We Met by the Blue Lagoon", "In My Wonderful Temple of Love", "Dearest of All", "Underneath the Whispering Pine", "Sunset Hour", and "Hello Mister Sunshine (Goodbye, Mister Rain)"), continued to appear through 1925 in various magazines. They included "A Little Bit of Good Luck" (a story about songwriting), Munsey's Magazine, 1920; "Moonshine" (ghost story), Action Stories, 1922; "The Unshorn Lamb (another story about songwriting) Snappy Stories, 1922. Some stories written at this time were unpublished: "Pilgrimage of Peril", "The Vengeful Vision" and "A Solitary Solution" (all 1924) until collected in Exit Into Eternity (1973).

=== Friendship with H. P. Lovecraft ===
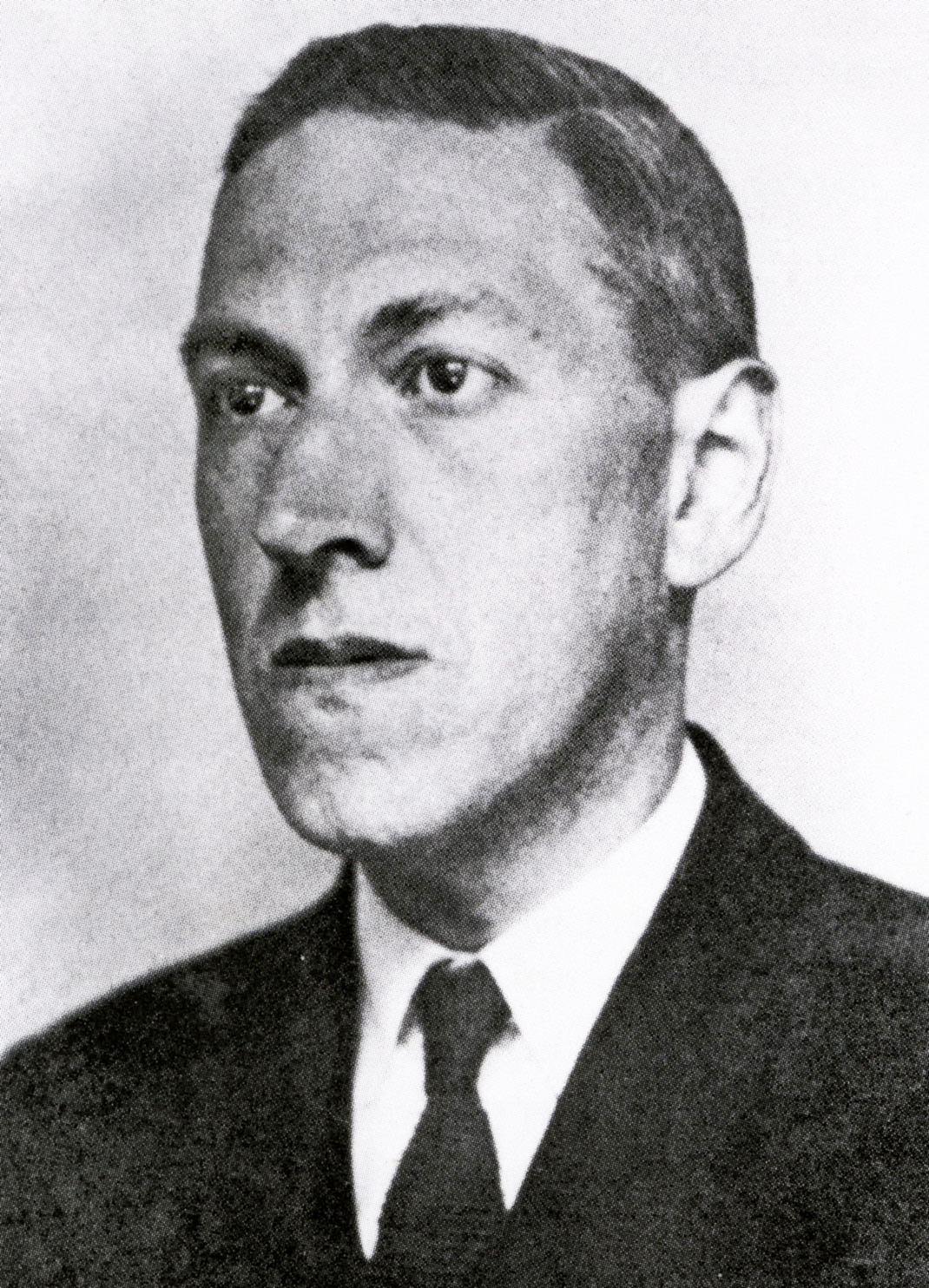
H. P. Lovecraft in June 1934

The Eddys' first contact with H. P. Lovecraft occurred as early as 1918. They first met face to face in August 1923, according to Muriel Eddy being introduced by Eddy's and Lovecraft's mothers, who were both active in the women's suffrage movement.

Lovecraft frequently visited the Eddys' home on Second Street in East Providence, and later called on them at their home in the Fox Point section of Providence. Eddy was a member of Lovecraft's inner circle of friends and authors, and he and Lovecraft edited each other's works. Both authors were also investigators for Harry Houdini and served the magician as ghostwriters. The two collaborated on The Cancer of Superstition, ghostwritten for Houdini, but the latter's death in October 1926 curtailed the project. (Notes and surviving fragments were published in The Dark Brotherhood and Other Pieces.)

Eddy and Lovecraft took scenic walks, including one to the Old Stone Mill in Newport, Rhode Island; August Derleth later incorporated notes taken by Lovecraft on this occasion into The Lurker at the Threshold (1945).

Eddy's wife Muriel typed many of Lovecraft's manuscripts and Lovecraft would often read the stories to the couple. Eddy wrote several stories that were published in Weird Tales during 1924 and 1925. These were "The Ghost Eater" (a werewolf tale), 1924; "The Loved Dead" (about demoniac desire for the dead i.e. necrophilia), 1924; and "Deaf, Dumb and Blind", a chronicle of Satanic sensations, 1925. Lovecraft's contribution seems to have ranged from making suggestions and perhaps a paragraph change. These tales are collected in The Loved Dead and Other Tales.

Other stories by Eddy which appeared in Weird Tales during 1924 and 1925 were "Ashes" (an experiment by a chemistry professor), 1924; "With Weapons of Stone" (a story of prehistoric man), 1924; "Arhl-a of the Caves" (another prehistoric man tale); and "The Better Choice" (about a machine for reviving the dead), 1925. These tales are also included in The Loved Dead and Other Tales (Fenham Publishing, Narragansett, RI 2008)

=== The Dark Swamp and "Black Noon" ===
On 4 November 1923, Eddy and Lovecraft sought the Dark Swamp, a place of which Lovecraft had heard rumours and which was said to lie "off the Putnam Pike, about halfway between Chepachet, Rhode Island and Putnam, Connecticut". The legend surrounding the place (which they never found) seems to have influenced the opening of Lovecraft's story "The Colour Out of Space" (1927).

The Dark Swamp was also the basis for Eddy's unfinished short story "Black Noon" (1967) (posthumously published in Exit into Eternity: Tales of the Bizarre and Supernatural, see below). The introduction to Exit Into Eternity explains that Eddy was unable to complete the work due to illness, and died in 1967; also that August Derleth was intending to finish this work, and perhaps expand it into a full-length novel, but it remained unfinished due to Derleth's death in 1971. "Black Noon"'s protagonist is a pipe-smoking businessman called Biff Briggs (standing in for Eddy himself – 'Biff' instead of 'Cliff') who reads pulp magazines in his spare time. After discovering the work of a superb horror writer named Robert Otis Mather (a thinly veiled fictitious version of H. P. Lovecraft) in the new pulp Uncanny Stories and finding he lives in the same town, Briggs befriends him and becomes a frequent visitor to Mather's house at 31 Spring Lane, Fenham. [This fictitious town was invented by Eddy and is featured in "The Loved Dead" (1923) and "Deaf, Dumb and Blind" (1924).] Mather (known as Rom for short, due to his initials), is partly cared for by his aunt, Agatha Sessions. Mather writes a trilogy of novels that seem to have taken him over almost by demonic possession. In the summer, Rom wants to investigate a town called Granville, which is reputed to have numerous haunted houses and calls on Briggs to transport him. Over two weeks, they hold nightly vigils awaiting supernatural manifestations; while no ghosts appear, Rom's life is nearly ended several times by seemingly unnatural accidents.

There is a published letter by Eddy on his relationship with Lovecraft.

=== Later career ===
Eddy was also a theatrical booking agent for 25 years, promoting shows that featured many famous vaudevillians and performers of the early twentieth century. In later years, he was a proofreader for Oxford Press, a principal clerk at the business management office of the Rhode Island State Department of Public Health, secretary treasurer of the Rhode Island Theatrical Booking Agents' Association, and president (1954–1956) and treasurer (1962–67) of the Rhode Island Writers' Guild. He died on November 21, 1967, aged 71, and is interred at Swan Point Cemetery.

== Fenham Publishing ==
Eddy's grandson Jim Dyer set up Fenham Publishing in Narragansett, Rhode Island, in 2000 to publish the works of his grandparents Clifford M. and Muriel E. Eddy.

== Bibliography ==
- Exit Into Eternity: Tales of the Bizarre and Supernatural (Providence, RI: Oxford Press, 1973; Narragansett, RI: Fenham Publishing, 2000). Introduction by Muriel E. Eddy. Contents:
  - "Pilgrimage of Peril" (1924; unpublished until this volume)
  - "The Vengeful Vision" (1924; unpublished until this volume)
  - "Miscreant from Murania" (1951, unpublished until this volume)
  - "A Solitary Solution" (1924; unpublished until this volume)
  - "Black Noon (a beginning) (1967; unfinished as explained above; unpublished until this volume)
- Erased from Exile (Lamoni, IA: Stygian Isle Press, 1976)
- The Terror Out of Time (Providence, RI: Dyer-Eddy, 1976)
- The Loved Dead and Other Tales (Narragansett, RI: Fenham Publishing, 2008). Edited by Jim Dyer.
- The Gentleman from Angell Street: Memories of H. P. Lovecraft (with Muriel Eddy) (Narragansett, RI: Fenham Publishing, 2001). Edited by Jim Dyer.
- Perils From the Pulps: A Collection of Tales (Narragansett, RI: Fenham Publishing, 2020). Edited by Jim Dyer.

== Secondary reading ==
- Popkins, George. "He Wrote of the Supernatural". Providence Evening Bulletin (Nov 25, 1963), 37.
