= Medusa's Coil =

Short story by H. P. Lovecraft and Zealia Bishop

- Short story by H. P. Lovecraft; Zealia Bishop
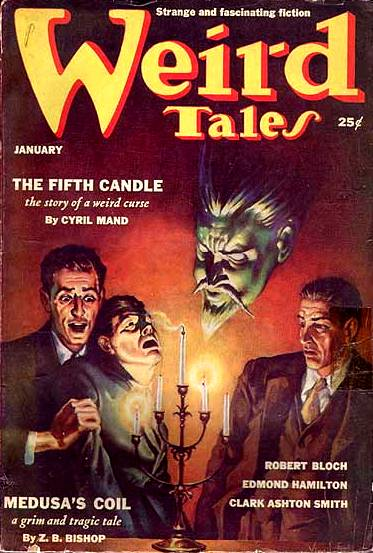
- Cover of Weird Tales, January 1939

Text available at Wikisource
- Country: United States
- Language: English
- Genre: Horror

Publication
- Published in: Weird Tales
- Publication date: January 1939

"Medusa's Coil" is a short story by H. P. Lovecraft and Zealia Bishop. It was first published in Weird Tales magazine in January 1939, two years after Lovecraft's death. The story concerns the son of an American plantation owner who brings back a new wife from Paris. It mixes elements of Lovecraft's Cthulhu Mythos with the ancient Greek myth of Medusa, but it has also been noted for its racist aspects.

== Plot ==
The unnamed narrator of the story is driving to Cape Girardeau, Missouri, but gets lost in the unfamiliar countryside. He comes across a rundown plantation house, and finds the only inhabitant is an emaciated old man named Antoine de Russy. The narrator asks if he could spend the night in the house. The old man agrees, and begins to tell him the tale of the place. He explains that he inherited the estate from his grandfather, and married in 1885. He had a son, Denis, who, as a young man, was sent to the Sorbonne in Paris. There, Denis met an artist, Frank Marsh, from New Orleans and the two men became involved in a mystical cult. Denis became infatuated with the head of the cult, a woman named Marceline, and married her. Around 1916, Denis returned to Missouri with his new wife, but Antoine and his servants found her strangely repulsive. When Frank Marsh came to visit, he developed a friendship with Marceline and insisted on painting her portrait.

Aware that his son may become jealous, Antoine arranged for Denis to be called away on business, while Frank Marsh set about painting Marceline. However, Denis comes home unexpectedly, entered the studio where Marsh was painting Marceline, and a fight took place. It was then that the painting was first revealed, showing the truth as to what Marceline really was. In horror, Denis killed Marceline, but her "blasphemous braid of coarse black hair" struck and killed Marsh "coiling around him as a python would". Denis confessed all of this to his father, and then killed himself. Antoine buried the bodies in the cellar, including the coil of hair around Marsh. Antoine comes to the end of his story, but offers to show his guest the horrific painting:

It was as the old man had said—a vaulted, columned hell of mungled Black Masses and Witches' Sabbaths—and what perfect completion could have added to it was beyond my power to guess. . . . The utmost horror of all, of course, was Marceline—and as I saw the bloated, discoloured flesh I formed the odd fancy that perhaps the figure on the canvas had some obscure, occult linkage with the figure which lay in quicklime under the cellar floor. . . . Surpassing all in horror was the streaming black hair—which covered the rotting body, but which was itself not even slightly decayed. All I had heard of it was amply verified. It was nothing human, this ropy, sinuous, half-oily, half-crinkly flood of serpent darkness. Vile, independent life proclaimed itself at every unnatural twist and convolution, and the suggestion of numberless reptilian heads at the out-turned ends was far too marked to be illusory or accidental.

Horrified, the narrator pulls out a gun and shoots the painting. But this, as the old man explains, has now unleashed a curse: "She and that hair will come up out of their graves, for God knows what purpose!" The narrator flees to his car, and drives away just as the house is engulfed in flames. After several miles, the narrator stops and talks to a farmer, but the farmer explains that the old man mysteriously disappeared and the house burned down "five or six years" earlier. The narrator drives on, but mentions one final horror that he learned from details in the lost masterpiece of poor Frank Marsh:

It would be too hideous if they knew that the one-time heiress of Riverside, the accursed gorgon or lamia whose hateful crinkly coil of serpent-hair must even now be brooding and twining vampirically around an artist's skeleton in a lime-packed grave beneath a charred foundation, . . . for, though in deceitfully slight proportion, Marceline was a negress.

== Reception ==
The story is noted for its racist elements, especially with the final racist revelation which is intended to be the culminating horror of the tale. This racism may have formed an integral part of the original draft around which Lovecraft added elements such as the Cthulhu cult.

When August Derleth published the story in an anthology in 1944, he changed the final line to: "though in deceitfully slight proportion, Marceline was a loathsome, bestial thing, and her forebears had come from Africa."

== Reprints ==
The tale was republished in 2012 in Medusa's Coil and Others.
