= Adolphe Danziger De Castro =

Jewish scholar, journalist, lawyer and author

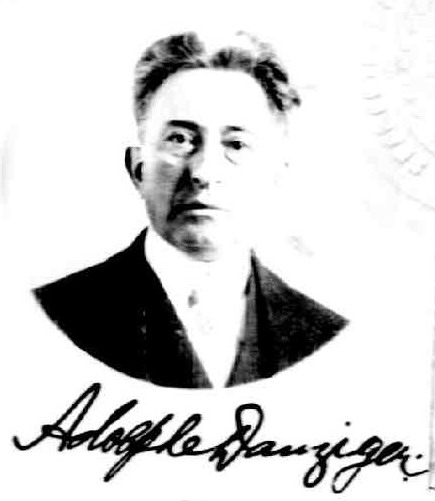
Adolphe Danziger De Castro in 1921.

Adolphe Danziger De Castro, also known as Gustav Adolf Danziger, Adolph Danziger, Adolphe Danziger and Adolphe De Castro, (November 6, 1859 – March 4, 1959) was a Jewish scholar, journalist, lawyer and author of poems, novels and short stories.

== Life ==
Adolphe Danziger De Castro was born Abram Dancygier, the son of Symcha Jakub Dancygier and Chaja Szarka, near Dobrzyń nad Wisłą, Congress Poland. He claimed that the ancestor of the family Dancygier was a Portuguese Jew named Israel De Castro who migrated from Portugal to the Netherlands in the 16th century and whose descendants settled in Danzig, whence the surname Danziger originated.

Danziger De Castro also claimed that he had received the rabbinical ordination by Rabbi Israel Jehoszua Trunk called 'R. Shiele Kutner' (1820–1893) around 1877 and had obtained a Ph.D. in oriental philology at the University of Bonn in 1882. In 1883 he emigrated to the U.S.A., where he first lived as a journalist and teacher in St. Louis and Vincennes (IN), before settling in San Francisco in November 1884, where he practiced as a dentist and free-lance journalist until 1900. In 1900 he moved to New York City to get a book published, abandoning his first wife and the children. In 1903-04 he served as vice-consul of the United States in Madrid. Since that time he worked as an attorney at law. In 1904-05 he lived in Aberdeen, Scotland, between 1905 and 1921 in California. On February 1, 1920, he was one of the thirty-nine founders of the Sephardic Community of Los Angeles (La Comunidad Sefardi) and was elected the first president of the congregation. Between 1921 and 1926 he spent some time in Mexico, between 1927 and 1936 he lived in New York City, since 1936 in Los Angeles.

He was first married in to Bertha M. Levy (b. 1867) and had the children Beatrice Danziger (1891–1974, married to William K. Dolan) and Nathan Danziger (1894–1965), who changed his name to Nathaniel Dolan. He got married a second time - without having been divorced from his first wife - in 1907 to Georgina Sterling McClellan (1880–1935) and, after his second wife's death, a third time to Maria Paez Urquidi.

Adolphe Danziger De Castro died at almost 100 years in Los Angeles, California on March 4, 1959.

== Works ==
Danziger translated the story "Der Mönch von Berchtesgaden" (The Monk of Berchtesgaden), by German author Richard Voß, published in a German monthly magazine in 1891, into English and contracted Ambrose Bierce, who supported Danziger's literary ambitions between 1886 and 1894, to edit the story. It was published as "The Monk and the Hangman’s Daughter" first in serial form in a San Francisco newspaper in 1891 and republished in book form in 1892.

In 1903, he wrote the academic book Jewish Forerunners of Christianity on the Jewish Patriarchs of the 2nd Temple Period from Hillel through Jesus Christ until Rabbi Juda the Prince, the compiler of the Jerusalem Talmud.

H. P. Lovecraft, with whom Danziger De Castro corresponded between 1927 and 1936, revised two of his early short stories in the late 1920s; they were published in Weird Tales.

== Partial bibliography ==
=== Essays ===
- "Extracts of the System of Jewish Philosophy and Religion of Maimonides", series of articles, in: The Jewish Voice, St. Louis, 1888.
- "The Position of Laboring Men Among the Ancient People, Especially Among the Ancient Jews in Palestine", series of articles in: The Jewish Voice, St. Louis, 1888.
- "The Story of Joseph, The son of Jacob: From the Legendary Lore of the Hebrews", series of articles in: The Jewish Voice, St. Louis, 1889.
- "The Jew in San Francisco, the Last Half Century", in: Overland Monthly and Out West magazine, San Francisco: Vol. 25, No. 148, April 1895.
- Jewish Forerunners of Christianity, New York: E. P. Dutton & Co., 1903 (re-issued in London: John Murray, 1904, and as Jesus Lived: Hebrew evidences of his existence and the rabbis who believed in him, New York: E.P. Dutton & Co., 1926).
- The Sephardic movement in Spain: A present day review, unpublished monograph (Box B-77-272, American Jewish Archives, Hebrew Union College, Cincinnati), ca. 1920s.
- All I Care to Tell, unpublished autobiography (at the American Jewish Archives, Hebrew Union College, Cincinnati).

=== Novels ===
- The Monk and the Hangman’s Daughter, with Ambrose Bierce, Chicago: F. J. Schulte, 1892 (first published as serial in: San Francisco Examiner, 1891).
- A Man, A Woman and A Million, London: Sands & Co., 1902.
- Children of Fate: A Story of Passion, New York: Brentano's, 1905.
- The Polish Baroness, (n.p.), 1907.
- Helen Polska’s Lover, or The Merchant Prince, (n.p.), 1908 (re-issued London, 1909).

=== Poems ===
- After the Confession, and other verses, Western Authors' Publishing Association, 1908.
- In the Garden of Abdullah, and other poems, Los Angeles: Western Authors' Publishing Association, 1916.
- The Painter’s Dream, Los Angeles, 1940.
- The Hybrid Prince of Egypt, plus, Song of the Arabian Desert, Los Angeles: Western Authors Association, 1950.

=== Short stories ===
- In the Confessional and The Following, New York, San Francisco: Western Authors’ Publishing Association, 1893.

=== Revisions by H.P. Lovecraft ===
- "The Last Test", in: Weird Tales, Vol. 12, No. 5, Nov. 1928 (revision of "A Sacrifice to Science", in: In the Confessional and the Following, 1893)
- "The Electric Executioner", in: Weird Tales, Vol. 16, No. 2, Aug. 1930 (revision of "The Automatic Executioner", first published in: The Wave, Nov. 14, 1891, republished in: In the Confessional and the Following, 1893)

=== Film script ===
- The World Crucified: A photoplay of the mundane activity of Christ, 1921.

=== Biography ===
- Portrait of Ambrose Bierce, New York: The Century Co., 1929.
