= The Mound (novella) =

Novella by H. P. Lovecraft

- Short story by H. P. Lovecraft (ghostwriter) and Zealia Bishop (original idea)

Text available at Wikisource
- Country: United States
- Language: English
- Genre: Science fiction/Horror

Publication
- Published in: Weird Tales (Volume 35, Number 6, pages 98-120)
- Publication type: Magazine
- Publication date: November 1940

The Mound is a horror/science fiction novella by American author H. P. Lovecraft, written by him as a ghostwriter from December 1929 to January 1930 after he was hired by Zealia Bishop to create a story about a Native American mound which is haunted by a headless ghost. Lovecraft expanded the story into a tale about a mound that conceals a gateway to a subterranean civilization, the realm of K'n-yan. The story was not published during Lovecraft's life. A heavily abridged version was published in the November 1940 issue of Weird Tales, and the full text was finally published in 1989.

== Plot ==
The story is narrated by an ethnologist who visits the town of Binger, Oklahoma, in 1928 to investigate certain stories related to a certain nearby mound, which is said to be haunted by a strange Native American man by day and a headless woman by night. The local people avoid the place, and there are strange stories of those who dared to venture there either disappearing, or returning insane and inexplicably altered. Being initially quite skeptical, the narrator brings some archaeological tools and visits the mound, noticing that the man pacing it appears closest to the Native Americans, but cannot be identified with any known Native American tribe. Through a talisman made of a strange metal given to him by a local chieftain, he unearths a strange cylinder made of the same unidentifiable metal full of hideous engravings and strange hieroglyphics.

Upon discovering a scroll written in Spanish in the cylinder, the narrator returns to his host and begins to translate it. The contents of the scroll, covering a large part of the narrative, describe the travels of one Pánfilo de Zamacona y Nuñez, an Asturian explorer, almost 400 years prior. Zamacona recounts how he was a part of an expedition from Mexico to North America, and how, through the help of a Native American, he discovered a vast underground world filled with grotesque temples, and populated by strange beasts and a highly advanced telepathic civilization who worshipped Cthulhu, Yig, Shub-Niggurath, and—until a certain incident—Tsathoggua. The members of the underground race—who lived in what they called the kingdom of K'nyan—welcomed him, but the more Zamacona learned about them the more fearful he became.

The K'nyanians had attained immortality and subjugated other races before them, had the technology to biologically modify vanquished races and other life-forms and reanimate the dead for use as slaves, and could dematerialize and rematerialize at will. The underground people also engaged in sadism, depraved practices, ritualistic orgies, and unspeakable horrors such as random body modifications and mutilations of other slave species as entertainment, in order to gratify their time-dulled senses. The bored inhabitants, desperate for new stimulation, are thrilled to have a visitor from the outer world, and through them, Zamacona discovers the history of the mysterious world. The K'nyanians are not the first advanced civilization of the world and have in fact built their society on top of another realm, which in turn had been built on another dark world even further beneath. They know little of the previous inhabitants, though it is implied that the K'nyanians' beasts of burden, a kind of quasi-mammalian quadruped, are the non-sentient degenerate descendants of the previous race, as they had first been found in the ruins of the older civilization. They also tell him of their exploration of the lightless realm, whose inhabitants worshipped a being known as Tsathoggua, a worship the K'nyanians brought back with them, but was eventually outlawed after the discovery of a hideous secret in the dark realm that may have caused the extinction of its inhabitants (the descriptions of which resemble a Shoggoth). The K'nyanians would develop a very advanced civilization but eventually regressed somewhat after finding no further use for technological advancement, returning to using their vast mental powers and beasts of burden for labor.

As Zamacona observed their decaying social condition and their reactions to his telling them of the surface people, he feared that they would one day decide to invade the outside world, where, given their advanced powers, they would be unstoppable. However, his hosts, who once had settlements on the outside world until the last Ice Age forced them underground, fear it and refuse to let him leave, out of fear that he would tell his countrymen of their realm, and their boundless greed for gold would attract an invasion, something Zamacona fears is inevitable, as more and more Europeans are arriving in the New World.

Eventually, Zamacona attempted to escape with T'la-yub, a female K'nyanian native who knew of an unguarded entrance to the surface world, carrying with him a cylinder containing a scroll that recorded his story, which he hoped would warn the surface world of the underground threat. However, he was betrayed by one of his biologically modified slave creatures and was captured. T'la-yub was sentenced to unspeakable tortures and mutilations at the amphitheater and ended up as a headless zombie guarding the entrance, while Zamacona was spared because they wished to extract more of his knowledge. Later on, he attempted another escape, which apparently resulted in the cylinder containing the scroll being deposited on the mound. His narrative ends quite hurriedly and abruptly.

The narrator is shocked by this scroll but remains skeptical, so the next day he goes to the mound again for further investigation, repeatedly telling himself that this is an elaborate hoax. Upon digging in a depression on the mound, he discovers a staircase leading deep underground, where he encounters dematerialized beings patrolling the tunnel (they are prevented from making the narrator one more victim by the talisman of unidentifiable metal) as well as the remains of equipment brought by explorers before him, some of which now has become partially dematerialized. Driven to near-hysterics already, the narrator finally comes across a fully material entity at the sight of which his nerves completely break down, sending him fleeing wildly back to the surface. That entity is revealed to be the completely mutilated and reanimated corpse of Zamacona with a message inscribed onto his chest in broken Spanish by the underground race. The message reads "Seized by the will of K'n-yan in the headless body of T'la-yub".

== Writing ==
H. P. Lovecraft wrote the story as a ghostwriter from December 1929 to January 1930 after he was hired by Zealia Bishop to create a story based on the following plot synopsis: "There is an Indian mound near here, which is haunted by a headless ghost. Sometimes it is a woman."

Lovecraft did not like this premise of what seemed to be a conventional ghost story. The outline was so brief it allowed for a great deal of license, so he made it into a 29,560 word story about a mound that conceals a gateway to a subterranean civilization, the realm of K'n-yan, which one of the main characters enters and lives in for a while. The story is one of only three by Lovecraft where a non-human culture is described in rich details, the other two being At the Mountains of Madness and The Shadow Out of Time. It is not as well known as the later two, as it was ghostwritten for another author.

Lovecraft refers to the allegedly hoaxed Tucson artifacts in the story. Archaeologist and Lovecraft scholar Marc A. Beherec argues that the Tucson artifacts also influenced some of Lovecraft's other writings.

=== Location ===
The mound in the story is located in Binger in Caddo County, which is a real town about 60 miles (100 km) southwest of Oklahoma City. He places the mound about a third of a mile west of Binger, an area where there are no mounds, which seems to make this geographic detail the only fictional part of its location.

There are several mounds in the area, but not as described in the story. One of them is called the Ghost Mound and according to a local legend is haunted by ghosts. It is located closer to Hydro, rather than Binger. It does not look like how Lovecraft described it, and is a natural formation. This is most likely the mound that inspired Zealia Bishop to present her story idea to Lovecraft. It is possible a second nearby mound, known as Dead Woman Mound, may also have inspired her. Unlike the first, there is no ghost story connected with it, though it gained its name when the buried body of a dead woman was found there.

== Publication ==
The story was not published during Lovecraft's lifetime. After his death, August Derleth abridged the story radically, and it was published in the November 1940 issue of Weird Tales. This abbreviated version was reprinted by Arkham House over the years until the original text was finally published in 1989 in The Horror in the Museum and Other Revisions, although some Lovecraft anthologies such as The Loved Dead by Wordsworth Editions continue to use the abridged Derleth version. It was published in 2012 in The Crawling Chaos and Others.

== See also ==
- The Phantom Empire — film serial on a similar theme
- Richard Shaver — claimed to know of a civilization such as that depicted in The Mound
