= Lovecraft fandom =

Informal community of fans of the works of H. P. Lovecraft

The Lovecraft fandom, Lovecraftian fandom or Cthulhu Mythos fandom is an international, informal community of fans of the works H. P. Lovecraft, especially of the Cthulhu Mythos and the Lovecraftian horror.

Lovecraft fandom emerged around the mid-20th century. It includes dedicated events such as the fan convention NecronomiCon Providence and publications such as Crypt of Cthulhu as well as numerous other media, such as the role-playing game Call of Cthulhu.

In 1988, an amateur Lovecraftian magazine, Midnight Shambler, was published by David Barker, and later revived by Robert M. Price, alongside the publication of Crypt of Cthulhu. Necronomicon Press published the magazine from 1996 on, with Robert M. Price and later Joseph S. Pulver as editors. It published original short stories by such writers as W. H. Pugmire and Gary Lovisi. Illustrations were provided by artists like Richard Sardinha, Darrell Tutchton, and Carole Wellen. Issues were published in 1988 and from 1996 to 1999. The magazine was headquartered in West Warwick, Rhode Island. Ellen Datlow described the Midnight Shambler as "a good little magazine for Lovecraftian fiction fans".

In 2010, a community writing project was held online to produce original stories based on Lovecraft's unfinished notes and ideas. The book, Commonplace Book of the Weird, formed the first publication of Commonplace Books, which went on to release the absurdist supernatural fiction podcast Welcome to Night Vale in 2012.

== See also ==
- Lovecraft studies
- Fantasy fandom
- Horror fandom
