= Lovecraft Remembered =

1998 collection of memoirs about H. P. Lovecraft edited by Peter Cannon

- Dust-jacket illustration by Jason C. Eckhardt.
- Author: Edited by Peter Cannon
- Cover artist: Jason C. Eckhardt
- Language: English
- Subject: Memoir
- Publisher: Arkham House
- Publication date: 1998
- Publication place: United States
- Media type: Print (Hardback)
- Pages: xiv, 486
- ISBN: 0-87054-173-0
- OCLC: 39785297
- Dewey Decimal: 813/.52 B 21
- LC Class: PS3523.O833 Z545 1998

Lovecraft Remembered is a collection of memoirs about American writer H. P. Lovecraft, edited by Peter Cannon. It was released in 1998 by Arkham House in an edition of 3,579 copies. Nearly all the memoirs from previous Arkham publications of Lovecraft miscellany are included.

== Contents ==
Lovecraft Remembered contains the following memoirs:

- "Introduction", by Peter Cannon
- I. Neighbors
  - "His Own Most Fantastic Creation: Howard Phillips Lovecraft", by Winfield Townley Scott
  - "Miscellaneous Impressions of H.P.L.", by Marian F. Bonner
  - "A Glimpse of H.P.L.", by Mary V. Dana
  - "Lovecraft's Sensitivity", by August Derleth
  - "Three Hours with H. P. Lovecraft", by Dorothy C. Walter
  - "The Gentleman from Angell Street", by Muriel Eddy
  - "Walks with H. P. Lovecraft", by C. M. Eddy, Jr.
  - "Lovecraft, My Childhood Friend", by Harold W. Munro
- II. Amateurs
  - "Little Journeys to the Homes of Prominent Amateurs", by Andrew Francis Lockhart
  - amateur writings by Edith Miniter
  - amateur writings by George Julian Houtain
  - "Howard Phillips Lovecraft: The Sage of Providence", by Maurice W. Moe
  - "A Tribute from the Past", by Ira Cole
  - "Idiosyncrasies of H.P.L.", by E.A. Edkins
  - "Ave atque Vale!", by Edward H. Cole
  - "In Memoriam: Howard Phillips Lovecraft: Recollections, Appreciations, Estimates", by W. Paul Cook
  - "Discourse on H. P. Lovecraft", by Rheinhart Kleiner
  - "Memories of a Friendship", by Alfred Galpin
  - "Young Man Lovecraft", by L. Sprague de Camp
- III. Kalems
  - "A Few Memories", by James Ferdinand Morton, Jr.
  - "Some Random Memories of H.P.L.", by Frank Belknap Long
  - "Bards and Bibliophiles", by Rheinhart Kleiner
  - "A Memoir of Lovecraft", by Rheinhart Kleiner
  - "Howard Phillips Lovecraft", by Samuel Loveman
  - "Lovecraft as a Conversationalist", by Samuel Loveman
  - "The Normal Lovecraft", by Wilfred B. Talman
  - "Walkers in the City: George Willard Kirk and Howard Phillips Lovecraft in New York City, 1924-1926", by Mara Kirk Hart
- IV. Ladies
  - "In Memoriam", by Hazel Heald
  - "Lovecraft as I Knew Him", by Sonia H. Davis (Sonia Greene)
  - "H. P. Lovecraft: A Pupil's View", by Zealia Bishop
  - "Memories of Lovecraft: I", by Sonia H. Davis (Sonia Greene)
  - "Memories of Lovecraft: II", by Helen V. Sully
- V. Professionals
  - letter to Weird Tales, by Robert Bloch
  - letter to Weird Tales, by Clark Ashton Smith
  - "A Tribute to Lovecraft", by Robert W. Lowndes
  - "The Genius of Lovecraft", by Henry George Weiss (Francis Flagg)
  - "The Man Who Was Lovecraft", by E. Hoffmann Price
  - "My Correspondence with Lovecraft", by Fritz Leiber
  - "Lovecraft in Providence", by Donald Wandrei
  - "Out of the Ivory Tower", by Robert Bloch
  - "H.P.L.: A Reminiscence", by H. Warner Munn
  - "Recollections of H. P. Lovecraft", by Vrest Orton
- VI. Fans
  - "The Barlow Journal", by R. H. Barlow
  - "The Wind That Is in the Grass: A Memoir of H. P. Lovecraft in Florida", by R. H. Barlow
  - "Lovecraft's First Book", by William L. Crawford
  - "H. P. Lovecraft: The House and the Shadows", by J. Vernon Shea
  - "Caverns Measureless to Man", by Kenneth Sterling
  - "Autumn in Providence: Harry K. Brobst on Lovecraft", by Will Murray
- VII. Critics
  - "A Note on Howard P. Lovecraft's Verse", by Rheinhart Kleiner
  - Variety column, by Howard Wolf
  - letter to Weird Tales, by Robert E. Howard
  - "A Weird Writer Is in Our Midst", by Vrest Orton (see Vermont Country Store)
  - "H. P. Lovecraft, Outsider", by August Derleth
  - "Lovecraft and Benefit Street", by Dorothy C. Walter
  - "H. P. Lovecraft: An Appreciation", by T. O. Mabbott (Thomas Ollive Mabbott)
  - "Lovecraft and Science", by Kenneth Sterling
  - "H. P. Lovecraft", by Vincent Starrett
  - "The Lovecraft Legend", by Vincent Starrett
  - "A Parenthesis on Lovecraft as Poet", by Winfield Townley Scott
  - "The Lord of R'lyeh", by Matthew H. Onderdonk
  - "Charon—In Reverse; Or, H. P. Lovecraft Versus the 'Realists' of Fantasy", by Matthew H. Onderdonk
  - "A Literary Copernicus", by Fritz Leiber
  - "H. P. Lovecraft, An Evaluation", by Joseph Payne Brennan
  - "Through Hyperspace with Brown Jenkin: Lovecraft's Contribution to Speculative Fiction", by Fritz Leiber
  - "Epilogue: Lovecraft and Poe", by Frank Belknap Long
