= Lovecraft studies =

Research related to American writer H. P. Lovecraft

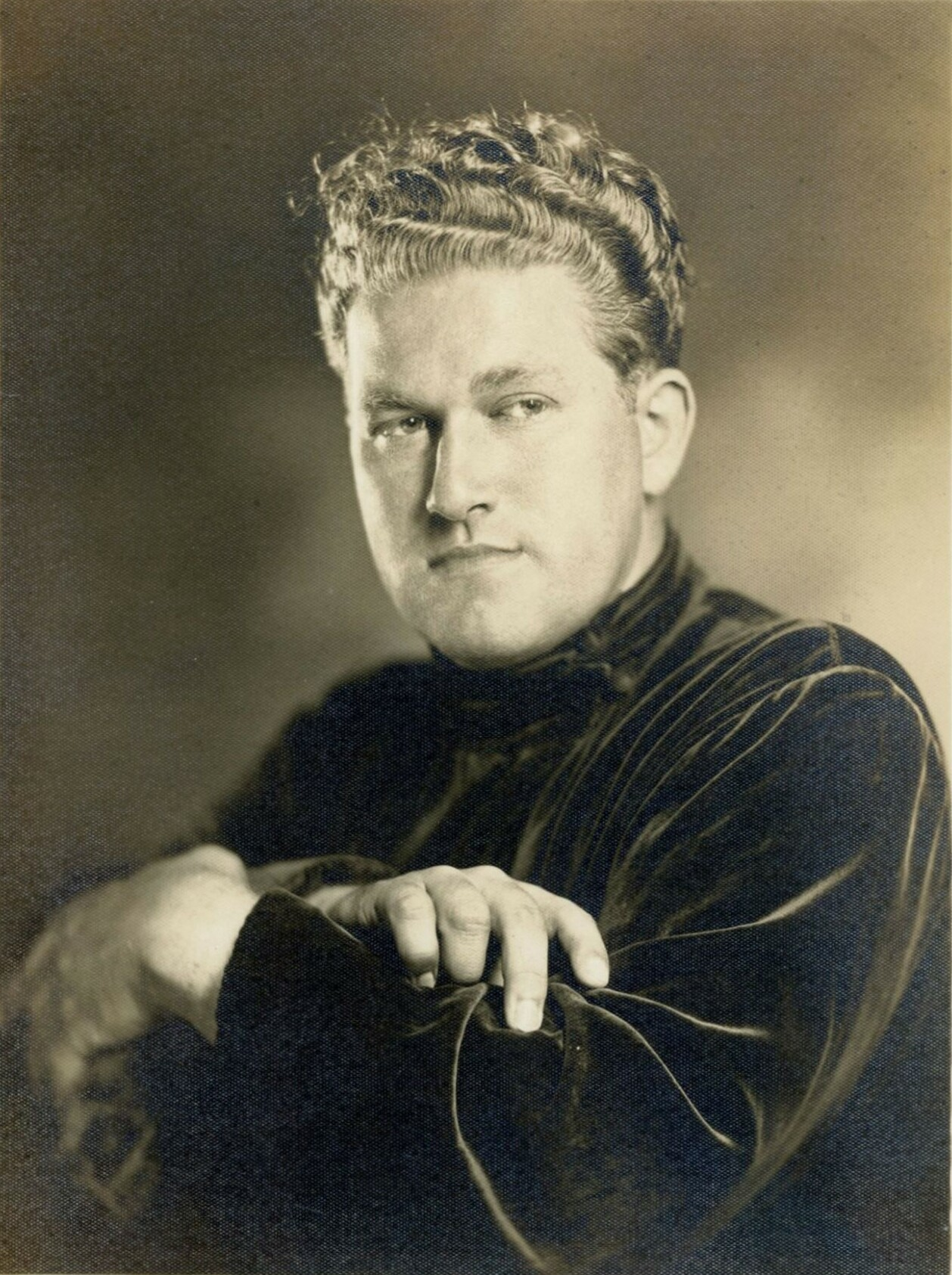
August Derleth, a key early figure in the field. His arguments are however poorly viewed by modern scholarship.

Lovecraft studies is the body of research that has emerged surrounding the works of H. P. Lovecraft. It began with the dissemination of Lovecraft's works by Arkham House during the decades after his death. The scholars in the field sought to establish Lovecraft as a major author of American speculative fiction during its foundational period in the 1970s. After the death of August Derleth, the founder of Arkham House, the field shifted in a direction away from the one that he promoted. L. Sprague de Camp's biography of Lovecraft emerged during this time. While criticized by portions of the fans and scholarship, it played a significant role in his literary rise. During the late 1970s and early 1980s, the scholars were split between traditionalist who supported Derleth's positions on Lovecraft and those who did not. The 1980s and 1990s featured an expansion of the field, including the H. P. Lovecraft Centennial Conference. Memorials to Lovecraft began to appear in his home city of Providence, Rhode Island and his works began to be published by Penguin Classics. S. T. Joshi, a major figure in the field, wrote a biography of Lovecraft that superseded de Camp's work. In 2005, the Library of America, published a volume of Lovecraft's works that solidified the perception that H. P. Lovecraft was now part of the western canon. The NecronomiCon Providence, a biannual scholarly and fan conference managed by the Lovecraft Arts and Sciences organization, began to be held in 2013.

== History ==
=== Early efforts and Derleth's work (1937–1971) ===
Lovecraft died largely unknown in 1937; his works having been usually associated with pulp magazines like Weird Tales. August Derleth, a friend of the late Lovecraft, is credited with the preservation and dissemination of Lovecraft's writing in this period, much of which was unpublished in his lifetime. Derleth founded Arkham House for this purpose in 1939. While Lovecraft studies as a serious scholarly field did not emerge until the 1970s, S. T. Joshi, credits the development of the field to Derleth's work.

However, work in this period was marred by low quality editions and misinterpretations of Lovecraft's worldview. For example, Derleth incorrectly argued that there was a dichotomy between the good "Elder Gods" and the evil "Old Ones" in Lovecraft's fiction, the expulsion of these Old Ones paralleled Christian theology, the beings in the stories were elementals, and Lovecraft's stories could be clearly divided into sets. Fritz Leiber, Matthew H. Onderdonk, and George T. Wetzel were among the early critics who were active in Derleth's time; they opposed others such as Edmund Wilson. Perhaps most egregiously, Derleth also published sixteen works claiming that they were collaborations between himself and the late Lovecraft; in truth they were written almost entirely by Derleth and included only loose concepts or fragments of original texts. These are not considered Lovecraft works by modern scholarship. Joshi has stated that Derleth was responsible for the "propagation of numerous errors, distortions, and outright lies about Lovecraft's fiction and general philosophy".

=== Wider scholarship (1971–2004) ===
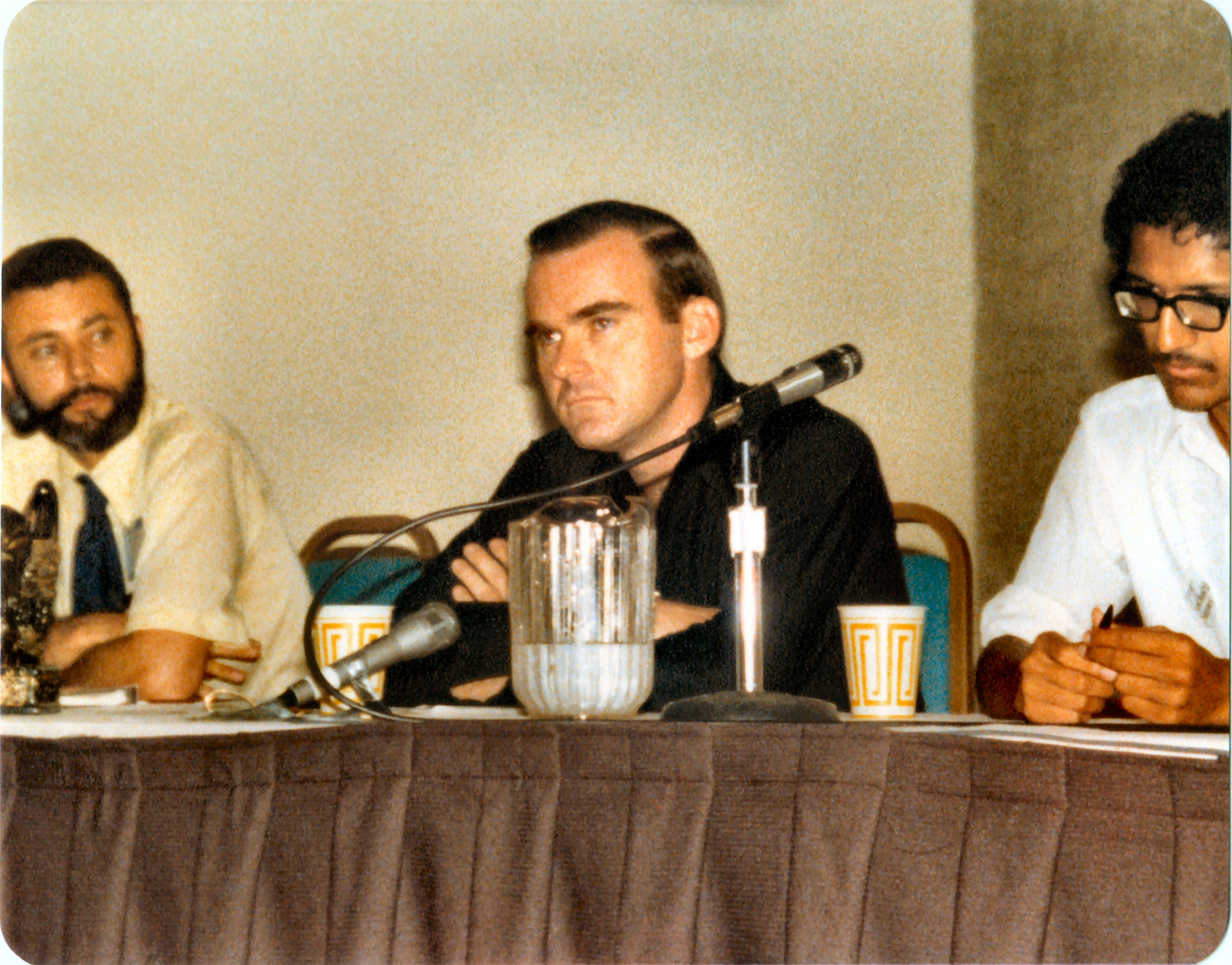
Donald R. Burleson, Dirk W. Mosig and S. T. Joshi at 1978 IguanaCon II

After the death of Derleth in 1971, scholars began to challenge his interpretations of Lovecraft's fiction. This process was begun by Richard L. Tierney's 1972 paper titled "The Derleth Mythos". Dirk W. Mosig furthered this line of thought and Derleth's interpretation ceased to be mainstream amongst the scholars. The 1970s and early 1980s were marked by conflict between "Derlethian traditionalists" who wished to interpret Lovecraft through the lens of fantasy literature and the newer scholars who wished to place greater attention on the entirety of his corpus.

L. Sprague de Camp, a science fiction scholar, wrote the first major Lovecraft biography in 1975. This biography was criticized by early Lovecraft scholars for its lack of scholarly merit and its lack of sympathy for its subject. Frank Belknap Long, one of Lovecraft's friends and correspondents, wrote his own book in an attempt to counteract the effects of this biography. Despite the criticism, de Camp's biography played a significant role in Lovecraft's literary rise. It exposed Lovecraft to the mainstream of American literary criticism. The first Lovecraftian scholarly journal, Lovecraft Studies, began to be published in 1979. It served as the main outlet for scholarship in the field and was edited by S. T. Joshi.

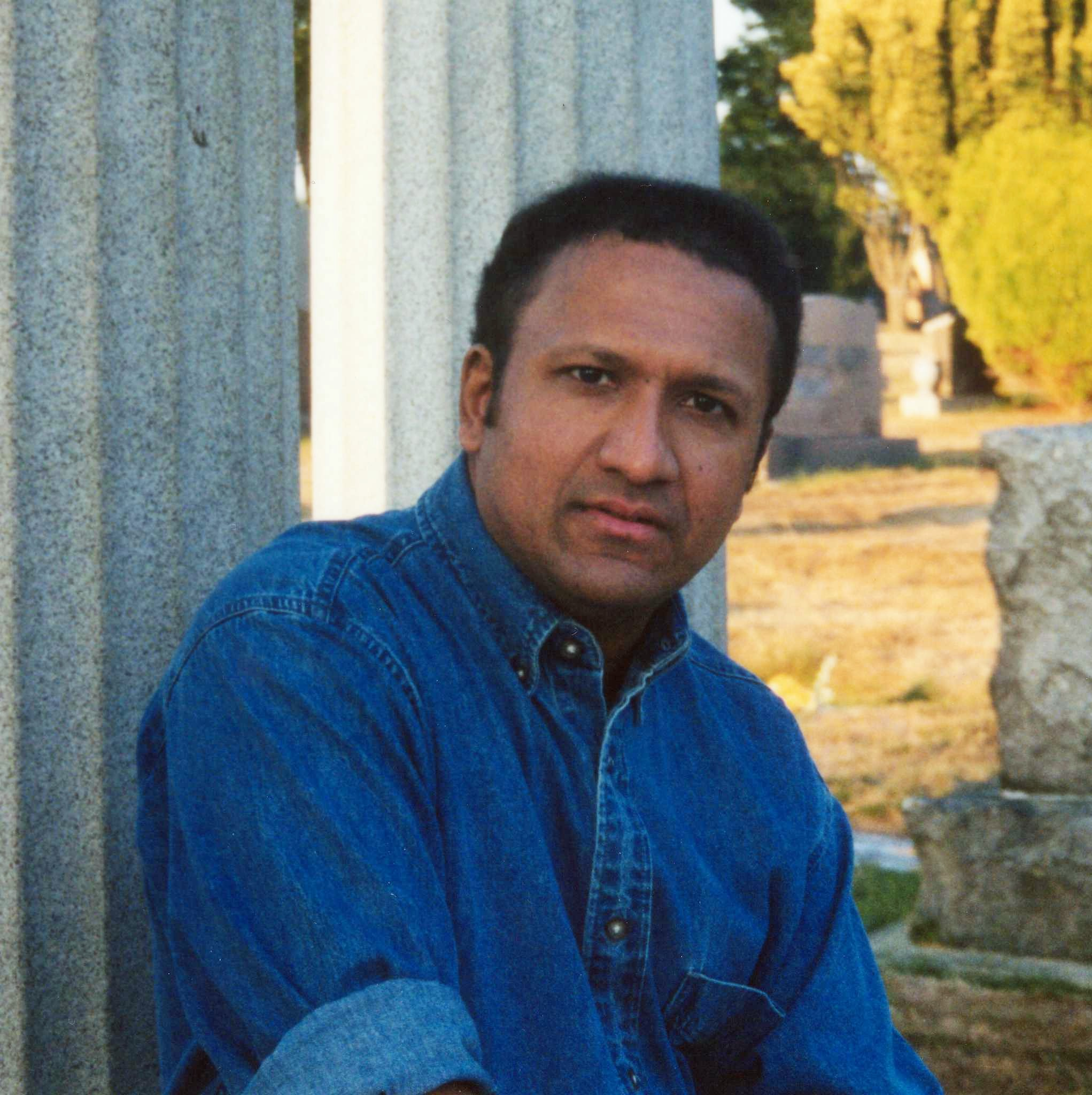
S. T. Joshi, editor of Lovecraft Studies and an influential figure in the modern field

The 1980s and 1990s saw a further proliferation of the field. This period saw the rise of the "Providence Pals", a group of scholarly fans who were the central figures in the field during those decades. They included S. T. Joshi, Donald R. Burleson, Robert M. Price, and Peter Cannon. These scholars contributed to various advancements in the field, including the publication of corrected versions of H. P. Lovecraft's stories, essays, and writings. Price began to publish his own scholarly fanzine, Crypt of Cthulhu in 1981. It publishes both scholarship and fiction. The 1990 H. P. Lovecraft Centennial Conference and the republication of older essays in An Epicure in the Terrible served as bases for then-future studies. The 1990 centennial also saw the installation of the "H. P. Lovecraft Memorial Plaque" in a garden adjoining John Hay Library, that features a portrait by silhouettist E. J. Perry.

Following this, in 1996, S. T. Joshi wrote his own biography of Lovecraft. This biography was met with positive reviews and became the main biography in the field. It has since been superseded by his expanded edition of the book, I am Providence in 2010. Lovecraft's improving literary reputation has caused his works to receive increased attention by both classics publishers and scholarly fans. His works have been published by several different series of literary classics. Penguin Classics published three volumes of Lovecraft's works between 1999 and 2004. These volumes were edited by S. T. Joshi.

=== Western canon (2005 – present) ===
The Library of America published a volume of Lovecraft's works in 2005. The publishing of these volumes represented a reversal of the traditional judgment that Lovecraft was not part of the Western canon. Lovecraft Studies experienced a hiatus in 2006 and was replaced by the Lovecraft Annual a year later. Barnes & Noble would publish their own volume of Lovecraft's complete fiction in 2008. Meanwhile, the biannual NecronomiCon Providence convention was first held in 2013. Its purpose is to serve as a fan and scholarly convention that discusses both Lovecraft and the wider field of weird fiction. It is organized by the Lovecraft Arts and Sciences organization and is held on the weekend of Lovecraft's birth. That July, the Providence City Council designated the "H. P. Lovecraft Memorial Square" and installed a commemorative sign at the intersection of Angell and Prospect streets, near the author's former residences.

== See also ==
- Lovecraft fandom

== General and cited sources ==
- Bilow, Michael (July 27, 2013). "We are Providence: The H.P. Lovecraft Community". Motif Magazine. Archived from the original on October 17, 2013.
- Dirda, Michael (September 4, 2019). "Dispatch from a 'Horror' Convention: It Began in a Dark, Candlelit Room . . ". The Washington Post. ISSN 0190-8286. ProQuest 2284363189.
- Dirda, Michael (March 7, 2005). "The Horror, the Horror!". The Weekly Standard. Archived from the original on November 5, 2009.
- Dziemianowicz, Stefan (July 12, 2010). "Terror Eternal: The Enduring Popularity of H. P. Lovecraft". Publishers Weekly. ISSN 0000-0019. ProQuest 609957378.
- Gafford, Sam, ed. (2015). The Providence Pals: Memories and Miscellany. Warren, Rhode Island: Ulthar Press. ISBN 978-0692495636. OCLC 962029541.
- Hantke, Steffen (2013). "From the Library of America to the Mountains of Madness: Recent Discourse on H. P. Lovecraft". In Simmons, David (ed.). New Critical Essays on H. P. Lovecraft. New York: Palgrave Macmillan. pp. 135–156. doi:10.1057/9781137320964_9. ISBN 978-1-137-32096-4. OCLC 5576363673. S2CID 163339940.
- Joshi, S. T. (1984). "The Development of Lovecraftian Studies 1971–1982 (Part I)". Lovecraft Studies. 3 (2): 62–71. ISSN 0899-8361.
- Joshi, S. T. (1985a). "The Development of Lovecraftian Studies, 1971–1982 (Part II)". Lovecraft Studies. 4 (1): 18–28. ISSN 0899-8361.
- Joshi, S. T. (1985b). "The Development of Lovecraftian Studies, 1971–1982 (Part III)". Lovecraft Studies. 4 (2): 54–65. ISSN 0899-8361.
- Joshi, S. T. (2001). A Dreamer and a Visionary: H. P. Lovecraft in His Time. Liverpool Science Fiction Texts and Studies. Vol. 26 (First ed.). Liverpool University Press. doi:10.5949/upo9781846312991. ISBN 978-1-84631-299-1. JSTOR j.ctt5vjhg7. OCLC 276177497.
- Joshi, S. T. (2009). H.P. Lovecraft: A Comprehensive Bibliography. University of Tampa Press. ISBN 978-1-59732-069-6. OCLC 458583085.
- Joshi, S. T. (2013). "Review of A Look Behind the Derleth Mythos, By John Haefele". stjoshi.org. Archived from the original on May 30, 2025.
- Joshi, S. T. (1996a). A Subtler Magick: The Writings and Philosophy of H.P. Lovecraft (Third ed.). Berkeley Heights, New Jersey: Wildside Press. ISBN 1-880448-61-0. OCLC 4566934. S2CID 169172551.
- Lovecraft, H. P. (2014). Klinger, Leslie S. (ed.). The New Annotated H. P. Lovecraft. W. W. Norton & Company. ISBN 978-1-63149-055-2. OCLC 966497696. S2CID 218735034.
- Mariconda, Steven J. (August 2010). "Review of I Am Providence: The Life and Times of H. P. Lovecraft". Lovecraft Annual (4): 208–215. ISSN 1935-6102. JSTOR 26868424.
- Oates, Joyce Carol (October 31, 1996). "The King of Weird". The New York Review of Books. Vol. 43, no. 17. ISSN 0028-7504. Archived from the original on September 10, 2009.
- Peak, David (2020). "Horror of the Real: H.P. Lovecraft's Old Ones and Contemporary Speculative Philosophy". In Rosen, Matt (ed.). Diseases of the Head: Essays on the Horrors of Speculative Philosophy. Santa Barbara, California: Punctum Books. pp. 163–180. doi:10.2307/j.ctv19cwdpb.7. ISBN 978-1-953035-10-3. JSTOR j.ctv19cwdpb.7. OCLC 1227264756. S2CID 229019856.
- Rubinton, Noel (August 10, 2016). "How to Find the Spirit of H.P. Lovecraft in Providence". The New York Times. ISSN 0362-4331. ProQuest 1810306270. Archived from the original on October 13, 2018.
- Siclen, Bill Van (August 16, 2015). "NecronomiCon Providence to celebrate life and work of H. P. Lovecraft". The Providence Journal. ISSN 2574-3406.
- Smith, Andy (August 16, 2017). "NecronomiCon, homage to H. P. Lovecraft, returns to Providence". The Providence Journal. ISSN 2574-3406.
- Tierney, Richard L. (March 1972). Frierson, Meade; Frierson, Penny (eds.). "The Derleth Mythos" (PDF). HPL: A Tribute to Howard Phillips Lovecraft. p. 53. OCLC 315586.
