= The Thing on the Doorstep =

1933 short story by H. P. Lovecraft

- Short story by H. P. Lovecraft
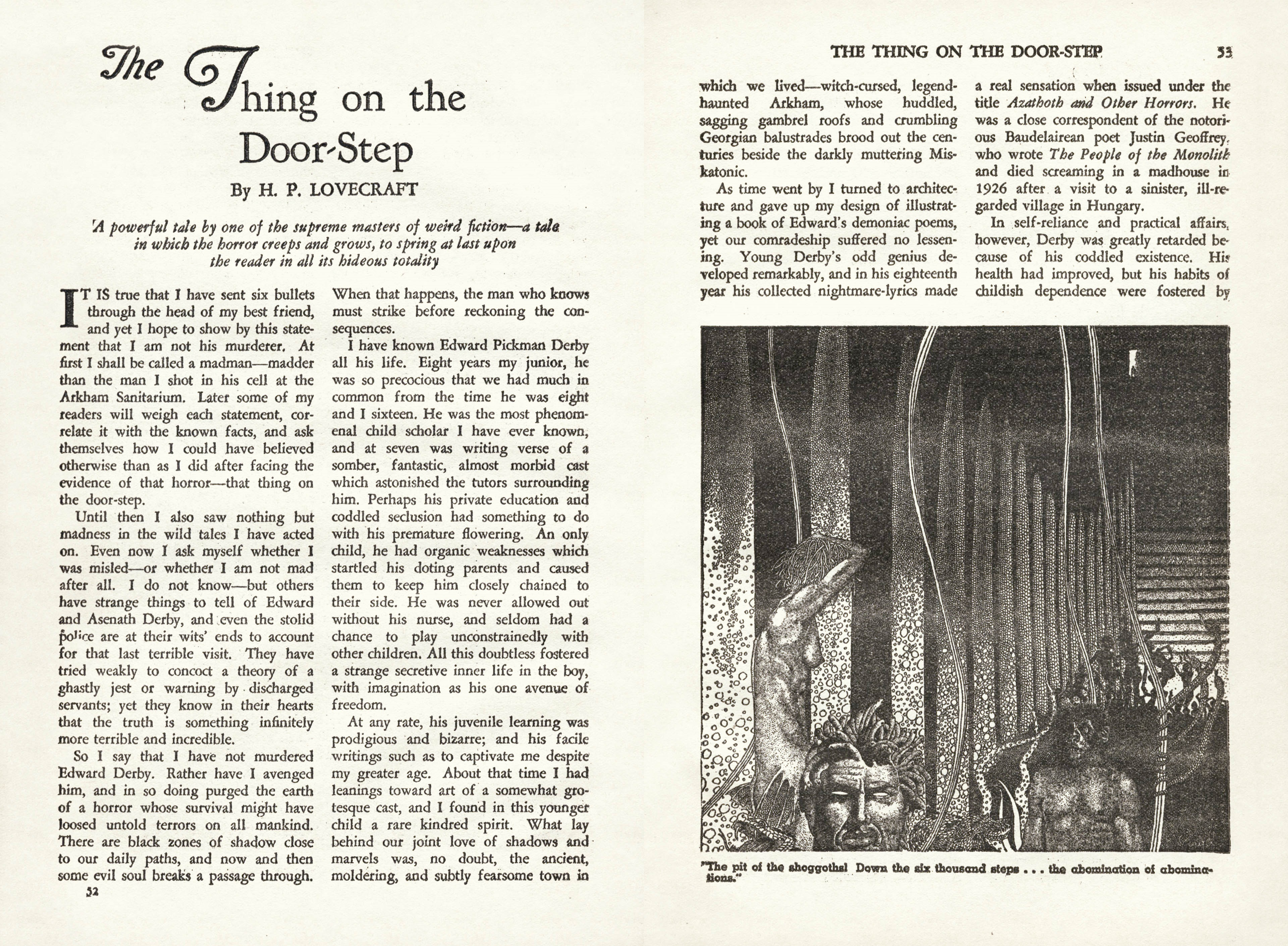
- Cover page spread of "The Thing on the Door-Step" as it appeared in Weird Tales, January 1937. Illustration by Virgil Finlay.

Text available at Wikisource
- Country: United States
- Language: English
- Genre: Horror

Publication
- Published in: Weird Tales
- Publication type: Periodical
- Media type: Print (magazine)
- Publication date: January 1937

"The Thing on the Doorstep" is a horror short story by American writer H. P. Lovecraft, part of the Cthulhu Mythos universe. It was written in August 1933 and first published in the January 1937 issue of Weird Tales.

== Inspiration ==
The idea for the story came to Lovecraft from a dream he had in 1928, which he wrote down in his Commonplace book as,

"Man has terrible wizard friend who gains influence over him. Kills him in defence of his soul—walls body up in ancient cellar—BUT—the dead wizard (who has said strange things about soul lingering in body) changes bodies with him . . . leaving him a conscious corpse in cellar."

== Plot ==
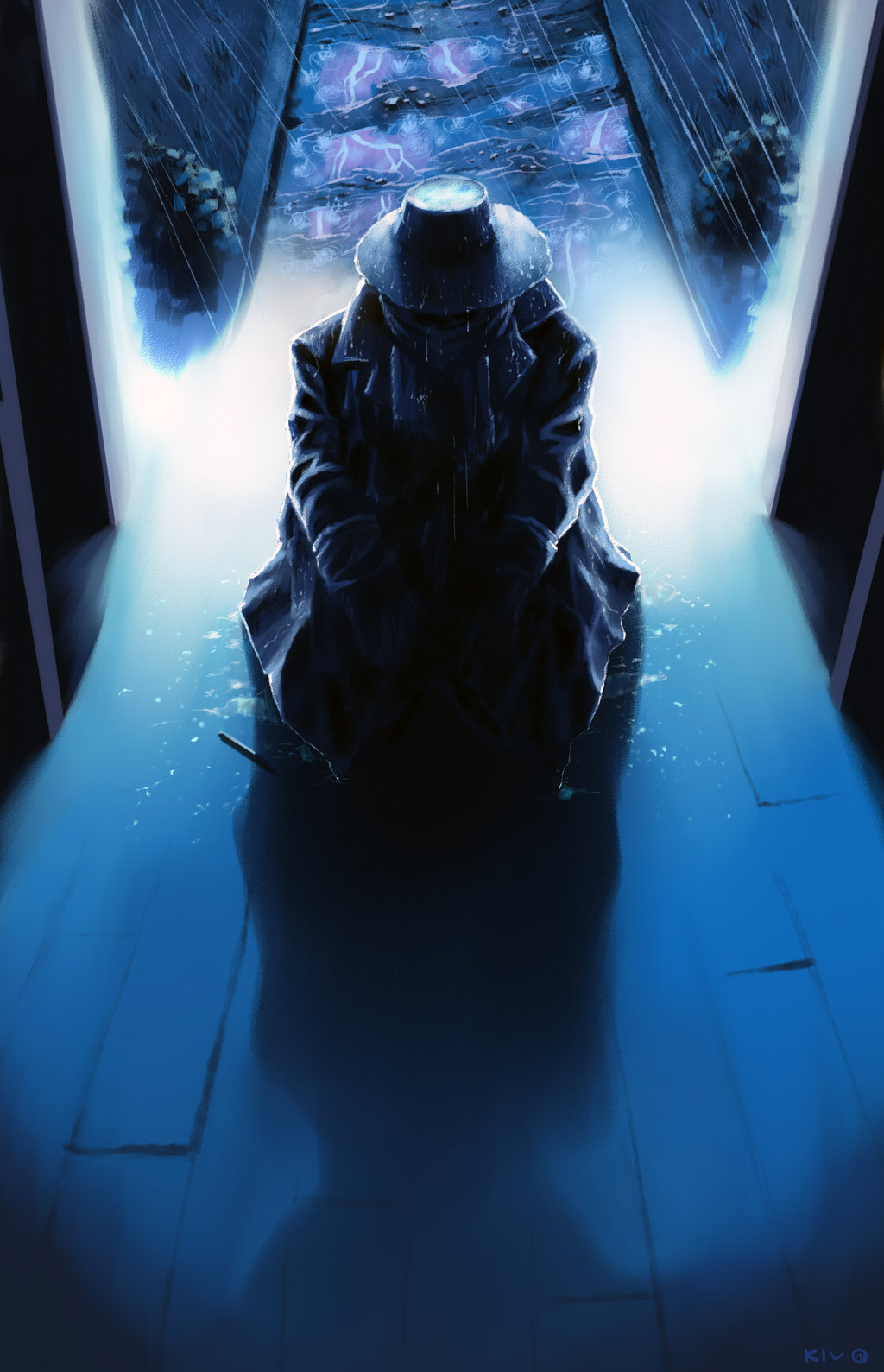
The story ends with the arrival of a hunched figure on the narrator's doorstep

Daniel Upton, the story's narrator, explains that he has killed his best friend, Edward Derby, and that he hopes his account will prove that he is not a murderer. He begins by describing Derby's life and career. Derby had been interested in the occult even as a very young boy, which led to him befriending Upton. The two would discuss dark mythology in their spare time. Whenever Derby visited he always used the same knocking pattern of three strokes, a pause, and then two additional strokes on the knocker; Upton had always been able to identify Derby this way. Derby's parents had always doted on him and he had a particular reliance on them, especially his mother. Her death had sent him into a depression from which he took a long time to recover. Upton then tells of Asenath Waite, a female classmate of Derby's at Miskatonic University. Edward and Asenath soon wed after bonding over their love of the occult. Despite his qualms, Derby moves into the old Crowninshield House, with three servants from Innsmouth.

A few years later, people start to notice odd changes in Derby's abilities. Sometimes he drives off by himself, even though he has never been taught to drive. Occasionally he is driven back by a chauffeur or mechanic while he huddles in the back seat of the car. Derby confides in Upton, telling him strange stories about Asenath. One night he comes to Upton's door in a panic and proclaims how he will never let her do a certain thing to him again. Derby tries to hint at how he believes that Asenath's late father, Ephraim Waite, may not actually be dead. In the midst of this story he abruptly stops, as if some hypnotic spell has come over him.

Upton is later called to pick up Derby, who has been found in Chesuncook, Maine, rambling incoherently. On the trip back, Derby tells of Asenath using his body, and is certain that it is in fact Ephraim who resides in the body of Asenath. Derby tells Upton, "She [Asenath] jots down a note in writing that's just like her father's manuscripts, stroke for stroke." Before finishing his story, Derby has a small seizure and rapidly changes personality, asking Upton to ignore what he might have just said. However, Upton sees a change in his eyes; he thinks they look like Asenath's eyes, then that they look perhaps more like Ephraim's eyes.

A few months later, Derby shows up at Upton's door and says he has found a way to keep Asenath away and to stop her from using his body, implying some sort of spell or ritual. Derby finishes renovations on his old family home yet seems strangely reluctant to leave the Crowninshield House. Upton receives another visit from Derby, who begins raving about his wife and father-in-law and how he can still feel her, him, it, clawing at his mind while he sleeps, trying to get hold of him. Upton gets Derby to sleep, but then has him taken to a sanitarium in Arkham. The sanitarium calls Upton to tell him that Derby's "reason has suddenly come back," though upon visiting Upton can see it is not the true personality of Derby, but the person he had encountered on the ride home.

Upton is roused from his sleep by a knocking at his door, using Derby's old signal of three-and-two strokes. Upton believes it may be Derby, but opens his door to find a dwarfed, humped messenger concealed under Derby's large coat, carrying a letter from Derby. The letter explains that Derby has in fact killed Asenath and buried her body in their cellar. But he should have realized that Asenath's (possibly Ephraim's) soul is partially detached from her body, and that the soul will live on until the body is cremated. Asenath had succeeded in taking control of his body while he was in the sanitarium, which means that "the thing on the doorstep" is actually Derby inhabiting Asenath's putrefying corpse. The note implores Upton to go to the sanitarium to kill Derby, who has now been permanently possessed by Ephraim's soul the way he imagines the original Asenath once was. Upton does so, though he reveals that he is afraid of having his soul transferred as well.

== Characters ==
=== Edward Pickman Derby ===
Edward Pickman Derby, the protagonist of the story, is a poet and husband of Asenath Waite. Lovecraft's depiction of Derby's childhood is considered to be in large part autobiographical:

Perhaps his private education and coddled seclusion had something to do with his premature flowering. An only child, he had organic weaknesses which startled his doting parents and caused them to keep him closely chained to their side. He was never allowed out without his nurse, and seldom had a chance to play unconstrainedly with other children. All this doubtless fostered a strange secretive life in the boy, with imagination as his one avenue of freedom... In self-reliance and practical affairs, however, Derby was greatly retarded because of his coddled existence. His health had improved, but his habits of childish dependence were fostered by over-careful parents, so that he never travelled alone, made independent decisions, or assumed responsibilities.

It is considered unlikely, however, that the typically self-deprecating Lovecraft was thinking of himself when he described Derby as a child prodigy and young literary sensation:

He was the most phenomenal child scholar I have ever known, and at seven was writing verse of a sombre, fantastic, almost morbid cast which astonished the tutors surrounding him... Young Derby's odd genius developed remarkably, and in his eighteenth year his collected nightmare-lyrics made a real sensation when issued under the title Azathoth and Other Horrors.

The title of Derby's book suggests that Lovecraft had Clark Ashton Smith in mind, who won acclaim at the age of nineteen when he published a book of poetry called The Star-Treader and Other Poems (1912). Another possible model is Alfred Galpin, a friend of Lovecraft's who was eleven years his junior, whom he described as being "immensely my superior" in intellect.

In writing that Derby's "attempts to grow a moustache were discernible only with difficulty", Lovecraft evoked his protégé Frank Belknap Long, whom he frequently teased for the same reason.

Derby's correspondence with "the notorious Baudelairean poet Justin Geoffrey" is an homage to the Robert E. Howard Cthulhu Mythos story "The Black Stone" (1931).

Like Upton, Pickman and Derby are both old Salem names. There is a suggestion in Lovecraft's fiction that the three families are closely allied; Richard Upton Pickman is the title character of "Pickman's Model", while the Nathaniel Derby Pickman Foundation underwrites the Antarctic expedition in At the Mountains of Madness.

Peter Cannon notes that the protagonist's character drives the plot of "The Thing on the Doorstep" more than in most Lovecraft stories. "Where cosmic forces usually overtake the typical Lovecraft hero such as Peaslee by chance, here Derby has only his own weak personality to blame for his falling victim to his wife's nefarious designs."

=== Daniel Upton ===
Daniel Upton is the story's narrator and the best friend of its protagonist, Edward Derby. After attending Harvard University and apprenticing with a Boston architect, he sets up his own practice in Arkham. He is married and, at about the age of 28, has a son, Edward Derby Upton.

Upton is an old Salem, Massachusetts name, reflecting the fact that Arkham is largely a fictionalized version of Salem. Lovecraft described Winslow Upton, a Brown University professor, as a "friend of the family".

In Fritz Leiber's story "To Arkham and the Stars" (1966), Upton is credited with designing Miskatonic University's new Administration Building and the Pickman Nuclear Lab, described as "magnificent structures wholly compatible with the old quadrangle." Albert Wilmarth remarks in the story that Upton "has had a distinguished career ever since he was given a clean bill of mental health and discharged with a verdict of 'justified homicide'".

=== Asenath Waite Derby ===
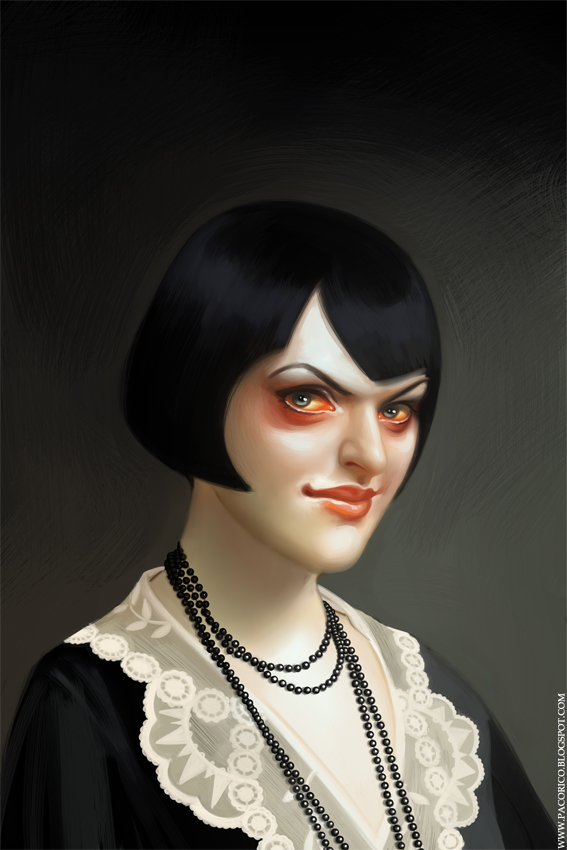
Asenath Waite from the cover for Innsmouth Magazine Collected#1-4

Asenath Waite Derby is married to Edward Derby and the daughter of Ephraim Waite. She is described as "dark, smallish, and very good looking except for over-protuberant eyes"—a look common to people from Asenath's hometown of Innsmouth. Combined with the fact that her mother was Ephraim's "unknown wife who always went veiled", there is a strong suggestion that Asenath is a Deep One hybrid of the sort described in Lovecraft's The Shadow over Innsmouth. The story highly suggests "Asenath" may not actually be in the story at all, but that her body is in fact being possessed by her father the entire time, who is now attempting to transfer into Derby's body.

In the Bible, Asenath is married to Joseph and is the mother of Ephraim. S. T. Joshi claims that her name translates as "she belongs to her father", and that "in the tale Asenath is literally 'possessed' by her father."

Peter Cannon writes that Asenath Derby makes "The Thing on the Doorstep", "the only Lovecraft story with a strong or important female character"—although the question is complicated by the tale's "gender-swapping situation".

=== Ephraim Waite ===
Ephraim Waite is the aged father of Asenath Waite. He is said "to have been a prodigious magical student in his day", and is described as having a "wolfish, saturnine face" with a "tangle of iron-grey beard." He "died insane" at about the time that Asenath entered the Hall School. Despite being an Innsmouth native, Ephraim appears to be entirely human as he had not transformed into a Deep One in his old age.

According to Robert M. Price, the model for Waite was real-world occultist Arthur Edward Waite, best known for the Rider–Waite tarot deck.

=== Kamog ===
"Kamog" is Ephraim Waite's secret name in the coven.

== Connections to other stories ==
The story makes frequent references to elements from other Lovecraft stories, including places (Arkham, Miskatonic University, Innsmouth, Kingsport), books (the Necronomicon, Book of Eibon, Unaussprechlichen Kulten – Edward Derby says that the books should be burned towards the tale's end), and entities (Azathoth, Shub-Niggurath, Shoggoths). Lovecraft returned to the theme of mind-transference in The Shadow Out of Time (1935).

Two novels suggested as inspirations for "The Thing on the Doorstep" are Barry Pain's An Exchange of Souls (1911), about a scientist's invention that allows him to switch personalities with his wife, and H. B. Drake's The Remedy (1925; published in the U.S. as The Shadowy Thing), in which a character with the power of mind-transference comes back from the dead by possessing the body of an injured friend.

Peter Cannon wrote two sequels to "The Thing on the Doorstep": "The Revenge of Azathoth" (1994) and "The House of Azathoth" (1996). Dark Adventure Radio Theatre: The Shadow over Innsmouth makes an oblique reference to "The Thing on the Doorstep" by referring to the Waites as a prominent Innsmouth family. Alan Moore's Lovecraft-retelling graphic novel Providence, part 6, features a character based on Asenath/Ephraim.

== Reception ==
According to Peter Cannon, "Most critics agree that 'The Thing on the Doorstep'" ranks among "the poorest of Lovecraft's later tales". He criticizes it for its "obvious and melodramatic plot, punctuated by patches of histrionic monologue", as well as its "rather formulaic" Arkham background. Robert Weinberg deprecates "The Thing on the Doorstep" as "not one of his [Lovecraft's] best stories" and S.T. Joshi in H. P. Lovecraft: A Life refers to it as "one of Lovecraft's poorest stories."

Lin Carter likewise dismisses the tale as "curiously minor and somehow unsatisfying...a sordid little domestic tragedy...wholly lacking in the sort of cosmic vision that makes Lovecraft's best stories so memorable".

L. Sprague de Camp offers a more balanced view, describing the tale as "in the middle rank of Lovecraft's stories: below his best but far above the Weird Tales average", adding that "Lovecraft paid more heed than usual to character in this story".

This is the only work of Lovecraft's included in the Library of America's 2009 anthology American Fantastic Tales: Terror and the Uncanny from Poe to the Pulps.

== Adaptations ==
- Alberto Breccia adapted the story in 1973.
- Stuart Gordon and Dennis Paoli intended to collaborate on an adaptation of the story following their work on Dagon, an adaptation of Lovecraft's The Shadow over Innsmouth.
- A film adaptation was released in 2014, adapted by Mary Jane Hansen and directed by Tom Gliserman. The film updates the setting to modern times and makes some other plot changes.

The H.P. Lovecraft Historical Society adapted the story for an episode of their radio show, Dark Adventure Radio Theatre in 2016.

In July 2022 it was announced that Joe Lynch would be directing an adaptation of the story, titled Suitable Flesh, starring Heather Graham, Bruce Davison, Johnathon Schaech and Barbara Crampton. The film was released at the Tribeca Film Festival in June 2023.

== Novels ==
- Edward Derby, Asenath Waite, Daniel Upton, and elements from The Thing on the Doorstep feature prominently in Lovecraftian: The Shipwright Circle by Steven Philip Jones. The Lovecraftian series reimagines the weird tales of H. P. Lovecraft into one single universe modern epic.
- A Hawk in the Woods, an original 2019 horror novel by Carrie Laben, draws its primary inspiration from The Thing on the Doorstep, including the premise of bodily transference and the naming of its protagonist Waite.

== Sources ==
- Lovecraft, Howard P. (1999) [1933]. "The Thing on the Doorstep". In S. T. Joshi; Peter Cannon (eds.). More Annotated Lovecraft (1st ed.). New York City, NY: Dell. ISBN 0-440-50875-4. With explanatory footnotes.
- Lin Carter, Lovecraft: A Look Behind the Cthulhu Mythos, Ballantine Books.
- Robert M. Price, ed., The Azathoth Cycle, Chaosium.
- L. Sprague de Camp, Lovecraft: A Biography, New York: Barnes & Nobles Books, 1996.
- Robert Weinberg, The Weird Tales Story. FAX Collector's Editions. ISBN 0913960160
