= Necronomicon Press =

American small press publisher

- Founded: 1976
- Country of origin: United States
- Headquarters location: West Warwick, Rhode Island
- Fiction genres: Horror and Fantasy
- Official website: necropress.squarespace.com

Necronomicon Press is an American small press publishing house specializing in fiction, poetry and literary criticism relating to the horror and fantasy genres. It is run by Marc A. Michaud. The press has been run in more recent times by Maddy Michaud (daughter of Marc Michaud) however appears to have gone inactive in 2023.

Necronomicon Press was founded in 1976, originally as an outlet for the works of H. P. Lovecraft, after whose fictitious grimoire, the Necronomicon, the firm is named. However, its repertoire expanded to include authors such as Robert E. Howard, Clark Ashton Smith, Ramsey Campbell, Hugh B. Cave, Joyce Carol Oates, Brian Lumley and Brian Stableford.

Necronomicon Press published critical works by such pioneering Lovecraft scholars as Dirk W. Mosig, Stefan R. Dziemianowicz, Kenneth W. Faig, and S. T. Joshi, including Joshi's biography, H. P. Lovecraft: A Life (1996).

The firm published critical journals such as Lovecraft Studies (now superseded by Lovecraft Annual published by Hippocampus Press) and Studies in Weird Fiction, both edited by Joshi; Crypt of Cthulhu, edited by Robert M. Price; and has also published critical studies of Campbell (The Count of Thirty, edited by Joshi) and Fritz Leiber (Witches of the Mind, written by Bruce Byfield).

Necronomicon Press was awarded the World Fantasy Award in 1994 and 1996 for its contributions to small-press publishing, and the British Fantasy Award in 1995 for its publication Necrofile: The Review of Horror Fiction.

Necronomicon Press' books are mostly illustrated by Jason Eckhardt and Robert H. Knox. Some of their titles, such as Lovecraft's The Colour Out of Space, contain original artwork from the amateur writers' magazines of Lovecraft's own time. One issue of Lovecraft Studies was illustrated by Sam Gafford.

A flood in March 2010 caused a loss of more than $20,000 worth of books. The press has since reactivated its website.

== Selected publications ==
- Crypt of Cthulhu 92–101, 108–113, edited by Robert M. Price
- Cthulhu Codex 7–16, edited by Robert M. Price and Joseph S. Pulver
- Demon and Other Tales by Joyce Carol Oates
- Far Away & Never by Ramsey Campbell
- Ghor, Kin-Slayer by Robert E. Howard
- Ghoul Warning and Other Tales by Brian Lumley
- H. P. Lovecraft: A Life by S. T. Joshi
- Lovecraft Studies 31–45, edited by S. T. Joshi
- Midnight Shambler 5–11, edited by Robert M. Price and Joseph S. Pulver
- Mosig at Last: A Psychologist Looks at Lovecraft by Dirk W. Mosig
- Necrofile: The Review of Horror Fiction 2–32 edited by S. T. Joshi, Michael Morrisson, and Stefan R. Dziemianowicz
- Other Dimensions 1–3, edited by Stefan R. Dziemianowicz
- Parts 14–15, edited by Robert M. Price
- Studies in Weird Fiction 7–27, edited by S. T. Joshi
- Tales of Lovecraftian Horror 7–10, edited by Robert M. Price
