= Speculative fiction fandom =

Speculative fiction fandom can refer to:

- Fantasy fandom
- Science fiction fandom
- Horror fandom
