= Peter H. Cannon =

American scholar

Peter H. Cannon (born 1951 in California) is an H. P. Lovecraft scholar and an author of Cthulhu Mythos fiction. Cannon has spent most of his career in book publishing. Before retiring in 2023, he worked as an editor for Publishers Weekly, specializing in thrillers and mystery. He lives in New York City and is married with three children.

== Nonfiction ==
Cannon first made his name as a critic in H. P. Lovecraft studies with his graduate theses written in the 1970s - A Case for Howard Phillips Lovecraft (Honors thesis, Stanford, 1973) and Lovecraft's New England (M.A. thesis, Brown University, June 1974). Lovecraft's Old Men appeared in a mailing of the Esoteric Order of Dagon in 1977; another by him, "You Have Been in Providence, I Perceive", published in Nyctalops (March 1978), studies the influences of Sherlock Holmes upon Lovecraft. Another article re: the Sherlock Holmes/Lovecraft influence, "Parallel Passages in 'The Adventure of the Copper Beeches' and 'The Picture in the House'" was published in Lovecraft Studies 1, No 1 (Fall 1979).

Two essays on Lovecraft appear in S. T. Joshi's critical anthology H.P. Lovecraft: Four Decades of Criticism (1980), respectively examining the influence of Vathek and of Nathaniel Hawthorne upon Lovecraft. Cannon later published a definitive critical study on Lovecraft, H.P. Lovecraft (Twayne's US Authors Series No 549, 1989). Cannon's writings on Lovecraft include the books The Chronology Out of Time: Dates in the Fiction of H. P. Lovecraft and Sunset Terrace Imagery in Lovecraft (both from Necronomicon Press). He edited Lovecraft Remembered (Arkham House, 1998), a collection of reminiscences by friends and acquaintances of Lovecraft, and co-edited More Annotated Lovecraft with Joshi.

He also wrote a personal memoir about another writer in the Lovecraft Circle, Long Memories: Recollections of Frank Belknap Long (British Fantasy Society, 1997). It was reprinted, with slight revisions, in Long Memories and Other Writings (Hippocampus Press, 2022).

Cannon's column "The Cannonical Lovecraft" appeared in The New Lovecraft Collector (Necronomicon Press) in issues 12-26 inclusive (Fall 1995-Spring 1999). Occasional critical articles on the weird fiction genre still appear, e.g. Better Than Half a Yard I Think: Arthur Machen and Real Tennis in Faunus: The Journal of the Friends of Arthur Machen (Autumn, 2000).

Cannon provides the Introduction to The Essential H.P. Lovecraft (Knickerbocker Classics/Race Point Books, 2016) and to Leigh Blackmore's collection Horrors of Sherlock Holmes (R'lyeh Texts, 2017)

== Fiction ==
His fiction includes Pulptime (WeirdBook Press, 1984), in which Lovecraft, Long and Sherlock Holmes team up to solve a mystery; Scream for Jeeves: A Parody (Wodecraft Press, 1994), which retells some of Lovecraft's stories in the voice of P. G. Wodehouse's Bertie Wooster. An omnibus of these two titles has been issued as The Lovecraft Papers (Science Fiction Book Club, 1996); this contains the corrected/expanded version of Pulptime.

He has also penned The Lovecraft Chronicles (Mythos Books, 2004;Subterranean Press, 2008), a novel based on Lovecraft's personal life. Later stories are collected in Forever Azathoth and Other Horrors (Tartarus Press, 1999; rev. ed. Subterranean Press, 2011 (as Forever Azathoth: Pastiches and Parodies); rev. ed. Hippocampus Press, 2012 (as Forever Azathoth: Parodies and Pastiches). He has also issued The Sky Garden (a chapbook; Dementia Press, 1989) and Episode of Pulptime and One Other (W. Paul Ganley: publisher, 2003 - two stories, one Lovecraftian, the other a story called "Vid" in which Count Dracula attempts to land a publishing contract. According to the copyright page of Episode of Pulptime & One Other, the edition was limited to 150 signed, numbered copies, of which "several" were bound in hardcover.

He has also written several short stories in the Cthulhu Mythos genre, often with an element of parody. These include "Forever Azathoth," a six-part sequel to "The Thing on the Doorstep"; "The Undercliffe Sentences", a takeoff on Ramsey Campbell; and "The Madness Out of Space", originally presented as a "lost" story by Lovecraft. Numerous other similar stories are collected in two chapbooks - The Thing in the Bathtub and Other Lovecraftian Tales: The Early Cannon Volume One (Tsathoggua Press, 1997) and its companion volume Tales of Lovecraftian Horror and Humor: The Early Cannon Volume Two (Tsathoggua Press, 1997). The latter contains a checklist of Cannon's tales between 1979 and 1995.

Cannon's story "The Letters of Halpin Chalmers", a direct sequel to Frank Belknap Long's "The Hounds of Tindalos", in which the main characters are thinly disguised versions of Frank and Lyda Long, appears in Robert Weinberg, Stefan R. Dziemianowicz and Martin H. Greenberg, 100 Crooked Little Crime Stories (NY: Barnes and Noble, 1994).
