= Michael Cisco =

American novelist (born 1970)

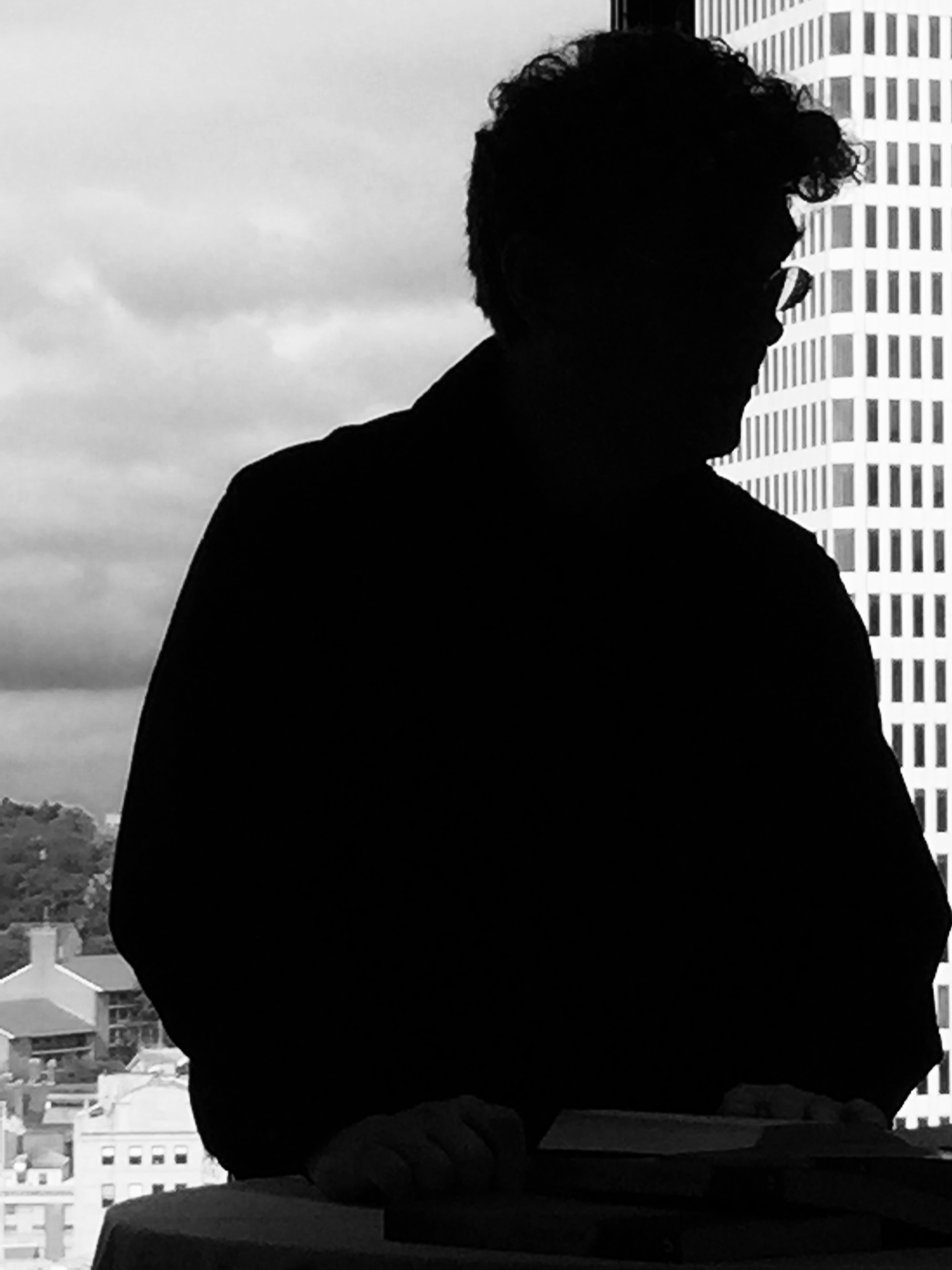
- Born: October 13, 1970 (age 55); Glendale, California, U.S.
- Education: New York University
- Occupations: Novelist; short story writer; academic
- Spouse: Farah Rose Smith (m. 2019)
- Writing career
- Period: 1999–present
- Genres: Horror Fiction, dark fantasy, weird fiction, surrealism, phantasmagoria
- Movement: New Weird
- Website: michaelcisco.com

Michael Cisco (born October 13, 1970) is an American writer, Deleuzian academic, and teacher currently living in New York City. He is best known for his first novel, The Divinity Student, winner of the International Horror Guild Award for Best First Novel of 1999. His novel The Great Lover was nominated for the 2011 Shirley Jackson Award for Best Novel of the Year, and declared the Best Weird Novel of 2011 by the Weird Fiction Review.

== Biography ==
Michael Terry Cisco was born and raised in Glendale, California. His father Terry Cisco worked as an inventor and principal scientist for the Hughes Aircraft Company and his mother worked as photographer and graphic designer for Glendale Community College's Public Information Office. Cisco attended Sarah Lawrence College as an undergraduate, where he received his bachelor's degree in 1992. As part of his undergraduate studies, Cisco studied at Oxford University for one year. He obtained his master's degree from SUNY Buffalo in 1994 and both his Masters of Philosophy in 2002 and PhD in 2004 at New York University. Cisco is a professor at the City University of New York.

== Bibliography ==
=== Novels ===
- The Divinity Student (1999) ISBN 0-9652200-1-X
- The Tyrant (2003) ISBN 1-894815-85-8
- The Golem (2004)
- The Traitor (2007) ISBN 0-8095-7235-4
- The Narrator (2010) ISBN 978-0-9846037-4-9
- The Great Lover (2011) ISBN 978-1-907681-06-6
- Celebrant (2012) ISBN 978-1907681158
- Member (2013) ISBN 978-1907681233
- Animal Money (2015) ISBN 978-1621052128
- Wretch of the Sun (2016) ISBN 978-161498-166-4
- Unlanguage (2018) ISBN 978-1621052661
- Ethics (2022)
- Pest (2023)
- Black Brane (2025)

=== Nonfiction ===
- Weird Fiction: A Genre Study (2022)

=== Collections ===
- The San Veneficio Canon (The Divinity Student, The Golem) (2004) ISBN 1-894815-68-8
- Secret Hours (2007) ISBN 0-9789911-0-9
- Antisocieties (2021) ISBN 0-5788368-8-2
- Visiting Maze (2023) ISBN 978-1-61347-326-9

=== Chapbooks ===
- The Knife Dance (2016)
- Do You Mind if We Dance with Your Legs? (2020)

=== Translations ===
- Headache by Julio Cortázar (2014)
- The Sound of the Mill by Marcel Béalu (2014)
- The Supper by Alfonso Reyes (2015)

=== Short fiction ===
- Uncollected Letter (1996)
- The Water Nymphs (1996)
- Reliquaries (1997)
- Translation (1998)
- For No Eyes (1998)
- He Will Be There (1999)
- Herbert West--Reincarnated Part VI: The Chaos into Time (2000)
- The Genius of Assassins (2002)
- Clear Rice Sickness (2003)
- Ledru's Disease (2003)
- Noumenal Fluke (2003)
- The House of Solemn Children (A Broken Story) (2003)
- Zschokke's Chancres (2003)
- The Scream (2003)
- Reminiscences (2003)
- The Life of Dr. Thackery T. Lambshead (1900-) (2003)
- The City of God (2004)
- Dr. Bondi's Methods (2007)
- I Will Teach You (2007)
- Ice Age of Dreams (2007)
- The Chaos Into Time (2007)
- The Death of Edgar Allan Poe (2007)
- The Depredations of Mur (2007)
- The Firebrands of Torment (2007)
- Two Fragments (2007)
- What He Chanced to Mould in Play (2007)
- Machines of Concrete Light and Dark (2009)
- Last Drink Bird Head (2009)
- Mr. Wosslynne (2009)
- Modern Cities Exist Only to Be Destroyed (2009)
- Violence, Child of Trust (2010)
- The Cadaver Is You (2011)
- Bread and Water (2011)
- This Is Tumor Speaking (2012)
- The Vile Game of Gunter and Landau (2012)
- Visiting Maze (2012)
- The Penury (2013)
- The Secrets of the Universe (2013)
- Unlanguage (excerpt) (2014)
- Learn to Kill (2014)
- Excerpt from Unlanguage (2015)
- Infestations (2015)
- The Figmon (2015)
- The Righteousness of Conical Men (2016)
- Rock n' Roll Death Squad (2017)
- Bet the Farm (2018)
- Their Silent Faces (2019)
- The Two Musics (2024)

Cisco's work can also be found in The Thackery T. Lambshead Pocket Guide to Eccentric & Discredited Diseases, Album Zutique, Leviathan III, Leviathan IV, Phantom, Lovecraft Unbound, Last Drink Bird Head, Cinnabar's Gnosis: A Homage to Gustav Meyrink, Black Wings, The Thackery T. Lambshead Cabinet of Curiosities, The Master in the Cafe Morphine: A Homage to Mikhail Bulgakov, Blood and Other Cravings, DADAOISM, This Hermetic Legislature: A Homage to Bruno Schulz, and The Weird.

His essay on author Sadeq Hedayat, "Eternal Recurrence in The Blind Owl", appeared in the journal Iranian Studies. Other critical articles by Cisco have appeared in The New Weird, The Encyclopedia of the Vampire, The Weird Fiction Review, and Lovecraft Studies.

In 2013 Centipede Press published a limited edition box set comprising four novels and a collection of short fiction. The novels are presented for the first time in individual hardcover editions, and each book features a new introduction: respectively, Jeffrey Ford (The Traitor), Rhys Hughes (The Tyrant), Joseph S. Pulver (Secret Hours), Paul G. Tremblay (The Golem), and Ann VanderMeer (The Divinity Student).

Dim Shores published the novella The Knife Dance in 2016. The project was curated by Joseph S. Pulver.

Nightscape Press released Cisco's novella Do You Mind if We Dance with Your Legs? in 2020 for their charitable chapbook series. One-third of all physical chapbook sales benefit the Los Angeles LGBT Center.

Cisco was on the editorial board of Vastarien Literary Journal as associate editor. He has described his work as "de-genred" fiction.

== Awards and nominations ==
The Divinity Student won the International Horror Guild Award for Best First Novel of 1999.

The Great Lover was nominated for a Shirley Jackson Award in 2012 and was declared the Best Weird Novel of 2011 by the Weird Fiction Review.

Unlanguage was nominated for Best Horror Novel by Locus Magazine in 2019.

Weird Fiction: A Genre Study was nominated for Superior Achievement in Long Fiction at the 2023 Bram Stoker Awards.

== See also ==
- List of horror fiction authors
