= Joseph S. Pulver Sr. =

American writer (1955–2020)

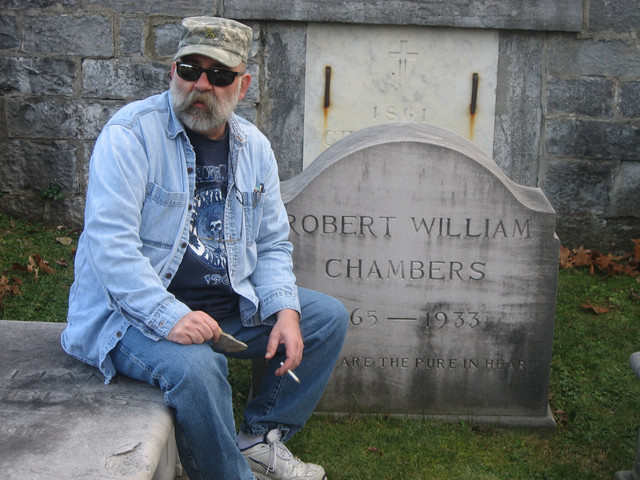
- Born: July 5, 1955; Schenectady, New York, U.S.
- Died: April 24, 2020 (aged 64); Berlin, Germany
- Occupations: Writer; poet; editor
- Spouse: Katrin Pulver
- Writing career
- Genres: Horror fiction, noir fiction, hardboiled, dark fantasy, poetry
- Website: thisyellowmadness.wordpress.com

Joseph S. Pulver Sr. (July 5, 1955 – April 24, 2020) was an author and poet, much of whose work falls within the horror fiction, noir fiction / hardboiled, and dark fantasy genres. He lived in Germany, and died from COPD and other issues in a German hospital on April 24, 2020.

== Work as author ==
Pulver started his publishing career in the early 1990s with a number of short stories published in various American small press magazines, foremost among them Robert M. Price's Crypt of Cthulhu. His tales cover subjects ranging from Robert Wiene's The Cabinet of Dr. Caligari to H.P. Lovecraft's Cthulhu Mythos and Robert W. Chambers' "King in Yellow."

Pulver's professional debut came with the publication of his Lovecraftian novel, "Nightmare's Disciple".

In addition to various American small press magazines (Hippocampus Press, Lovecraft eZine, Nemonymous, etc.), Pulver's work has been featured in numerous anthologies in the US, UK, France, and Japan. Some of these anthologies include: "Black Wings: New Tales of Lovecraftian Horror", "The Tindalos Mythos", "Spawn of the Green Abyss", "The Book of Eibon", Lin Carter's "Anton Zarnak: Supernatural Sleuth", and "Rehearsals For Oblivion".

Nearly two dozen short works of his have been translated into French and Japanese.

== Work as editor ==
Pulver has also been the editor of Midnight Shambler and Tales of Lovecraftian Horror. He was also the co-editor for Crypt of Cthulhu, published by Mythos Books LLC working alongside Robert M. Price, Michael Cisco and David Wynn.

He has also edited collections by Ann K. Schwader (The Worms Remember, Hive Press) and John B. Ford (Dark Shadows on the Moon, Hive Press).

In 2012 Pulver edited A Season in Carcosa (an anthology of new tales based on Robert W. Chambers' "The King in Yellow" tales) for Miskatonic River Press. A year later he edited the award-winning anthology The Grimscribe's Puppets (a tribute anthology to Thomas Ligotti for the same publisher).

Mr. Pulver was guest editor for the Lovecraft eZine The King in Yellow special issue, which was published in April 2014.

Cassilda's Song (Chaosium), is an anthology based on Robert W. Chambers's King in Yellow with new tales, written by female writers. The anthology has been released in 2015 in electronic format and available in print in the first quarter of 2016.

For the Necronomicon Providence Mr. Pulver edited a Round Robin for the Lovecraft Arts & Sciences Council, that included stories, artwork and accounts by participants of the Necronomicon Providence in 2013 and 2015.

In 2016 and 2017 several anthologies that have been edited by Joseph S. Pulver were published. Amongst them are The Madness of Dr. Caligari (Fedogan & Bremer, 2016), Darker Companions - a tribute to Ramsey Campbell, co-edited with Scott David Aniolowski (PS Publishing, 2016), Born under a Bad Sign and The Leaves of a Necronomicon (Chaosium in 2016/2017).

Mr. Pulver has curated the release of the Michael Cisco novella Knife Dance for Dim Shores. The novella was published in 2016.

== Awards and nominations ==
- 2013 Shirley Jackson Award, as editor for Superior Work in an Anthology. The Grimscribe's Puppets (Miskatonic River Press)
- 2013 Bram Stoker Award, Finalist for award in Superior Achievement in the Anthology Category. The Grimscribe's Puppets (Miskatonic River Press)
- 2016 World Fantasy Award, Finalist for World Fantasy Award for Best Anthology. Cassilda's Song (Chaosium)
- 2016 Shirley Jackson Award nominee, for edited anthology. The Madness of Dr. Caligari (Fedogan & Bremer)

== Publications ==
=== as editor ===
- The Worms remember by Ann K. Schwader, Hive Press, 2001
- Dark Shadows on the Moon by John B. Ford, Hive Press, 2001
- A Season in Carcosa, Miskatonic River Press, 2012
- The Grimscribe's Puppets, Miskatonic River Press, 2013
- Cassilda's Song, Chaosium, 2015
- The Doom that came to Providence, The Lovecraft Arts & Sciences Council, 2015
- Darker Companions, PS Publishing, co-edited with Scott D. Aniolowski
- The Leaves of a Necronomicon, Chaosium
- The Madness of Dr. Caligari, Fedogan & Bremer
- Born under a Bad Sign, Chaosium

=== Novels ===
- Nightmare's Disciple, Chaosium 1999
- The Orphan Palace, Chômu Press, October 2011

=== Collections ===
- Blood Will Have Its Season, edited by S.T. Joshi, Hippocampus Press 2009
- SIN & ashes, edited by S.T. Joshi, Hippocampus Press 2010
- Portraits of Ruin, Hippocampus Press 2012
- A House of Hollow Wounds, edited by Jeffrey Thomas, Hippocampus Press 2015
- The Protocols of Ugliness, (forthcoming) 2015
- The King in Yellow Tales, Vol. 1, Lovecraft eZine books

Graphic Novels

- Knots, Gestures and Positions in Outside An anthology of new horror fiction with artist Kim Bo Yung. Published by Ash Pure and Topic Press.

== Critical reception ==
Anna Tambour: "In human terms, if I had to compare him to other authors, I would say that he reminds me more of a mug of hot Lear blended with Cummings, served with a squeeze of post-enema'd Shelley."

=== Blood Will Have Its Season ===
"The prose of Joe Pulver can take its place with that of the masters of our genre-Poe, Lovecraft, Campbell, Ligotti-while his imaginative reach is something uniquely his own." — From S. T. Joshi's Foreword.

"In this innovative, hypnotic collection, Joseph S. Pulver Sr. has proven himself to be a perversely masterful sculptor of our dreams."-Jeffrey Thomas.

"Joe Pulver is a dark star in the merciless cosmos of weird fiction. His work is as brutal as it is beautiful." — Wilum Pugmire.

"In an earlier day I feel sure Joe Pulver would have been arrested for writing some of the stuff in this collection. Maybe he will be yet! How can he write, with such intricate delicacy, thunderous prose that fairly rips up the pages it is printed on? I wish I knew!" — Robert M. Price.

=== The Grimscribe's Puppets ===
"Thomas Ligotti is beyond doubt one of the Grandmasters of Weird Fiction. In The Grimscribe's Puppets, Joseph S. Pulver Sr. has commissioned both new and established talents in the world of weird fiction and horror to contribute all new tales that pay homage to Ligotti and celebrate his eerie and essential nightmares. Poppy Z. Brite once asked, "Are you out there, Thomas Ligotti?" This anthology proves not only is he alive and well, but his extraordinary illuminations have proven to be a visionary and fertile source of inspiration for some of today's most accomplished authors."

=== The Orphan Palace ===
Maureen Kincaid Speller for Weird Fiction Review: "Moving to the present day, The Orphan Palace by Joseph S. Pulver (Chômu Press, 2011) certainly cannot be accused of such reticence. Ostensibly, the story of a road trip made by a serial arsonist and killer, from the West Coast to the East, in search of his childhood nemesis is not promising material, and I don't mind admitting that The Orphan Palace initially seemed to sit far out on the edge of my reading comfort zone. However, it quickly became clear that there is much more to this novel than a trail of dumped cars, torched buildings and broken and bloody bodies."

=== Portraits of Ruin ===
Matt Cardin: "Just be prepared for a ride that will upend your sensibilities. [...] Portraits of Ruin truly is a Coney Island of the Mind. But it's one where the rides drip with darkness and tilt at non-Euclidean angles, and whirl you into an abyss of strange entity that grins and chitters and babbles in alien tongues (which eventually come to sound like your own voice)."

"Let us posit that Bukowski is the sun. Or Brautigan, Burroughs and the Beats—a solar Coney Island of the Mind where Timothy Leary's dead and dead Cthulhu waits and sings the live long daydream believer. Then Joe Pulver's Portraits of Ruin would be the burst of planets, Big Bang-Bang, Marquee Moons hanging on for what they got, scream of consciousness—in Outer Space no one can hear it . . . except Coffin Joe, Monster Mash Potato that big ol' Portraits of Ruin—Mars needs it, you need it, so just open the lid and shake your fist—then say: "They kill horses, horses, horses, horses." Thank you. Come again?" —Thomas Ligotti.

"Fearless. Daring. Poetic prose for the unhinged. Each tale in Portraits of Ruin packs the sort of mental wallop that leaves the reader reeling. From the scorched deserts to the highest foreign towers, across plains of reality and beneath burning suns, this is no volume for the weak, for the conventional. It is a wake-up call from one of the genre's most visionary masters. A book for those who see differently, for those not afraid to know the truth no matter how terrible the cost. I envy anyone about to experience Pulver's horrors for the first time." – Simon Strantzas, author of Nightingale Songs.

=== A Season in Carcosa ===
Nic Pizzolatto, the creator of True Detective, refers to A Season in Carcosa in a recent interview with The Wall Street Journal "For fans of the show who'd like to see what contemporary voices have done with Chambers' "King in Yellow," I'd point them toward Karl Edward Wagner's short story "The River of Night's Dreaming" or the recent anthology "A Season in Carcosa."

Walter Hicks (Hellbound Times): "This is a superior collection, with a diverse and outstanding line-up of talent. As with any anthology, some of the stories will work better for individual readers than others, but each one merits inclusion and consideration here. Does it accentuate the reading experience to be familiar with Chambers/The King in Yellow? Probably, and though I would highly recommend reading the source material, it certainly is not a necessity. All readers who enjoy ominous, enigmatic and darkly beautiful literature, highly imaginative journeys into madness, altered realities and the true terror behind the Mask will relish spending A Season in Carcosa."

=== SIN & ashes ===
Laird Barron in SF Signal: "Joe Pulver's Sin & Ashes is a hardboiled/noir/horror collection that reads like prose poetry; a psychedelic hybrid of James Ellroy, William Burroughs, and H.P. Lovecraft. It'll rattle your brain."

"Joseph S Pulver Sr. is a thunderous scribe of dark fiction. His poetry slams into you, cracking through flesh and bone to the real meat beneath. SIN & ashes is his mighty hammer, deftly wielded and smithed on Hephaestus's great anvil. This is no book for the faint of heart. Filled with hard boiled goodness and devastating imagery, Pulver proves his is a talent to be reckoned with, and cements his rightful place as one of the most interesting voices in the genre. I am both awed and humbled by his power." — Simon Strantzas.

"Joe Pulver's Sin and Ashes is a messed up (and I mean Cronenberg messed up) splicing of William S. Burroughs and Thomas Ligotti. Add a whiskey chaser. After reading these vibrant and weird stories with their assorted devils and down-and-outs, I kinda want to party with Joe. But I think I'm too scared to." — Paul Tremblay, author of The Little Sleep and in the Mean Time.
