= Cthulhu Cultus =

- Associate Editor: James Ambuehl
- Categories: Horror
- Frequency: Tri-yearly
- Publisher: Mythos Books
- Founded: 1995
- Final issue: 2001
- Country: USA
- Based in: Florida
- Language: English

Cthulhu Cultus was a small press horror magazine, that was published from 1995 to 2001. Its total run included 18 issues. Cthulhu Cultus published the works of established horror fiction and noir writers like Joseph S. Pulver and D.F. Lewis, and was devoted to weird, supernatural and horror fiction and poetry with an emphasis on H. P. Lovecraft's Cthulhu Mythos.

It was published by Mythos Books. Editions were published by Philip Marsh and Tani Jantsang in Florida, and the Associate Editor was James Ambuehl. Illustrations were done by T. Marsh. The editors also recorded a 60-minute CD of original Cthulhu Cultus Music.

== Contributors ==
Contributors included James Ambuehl, Tracy Ambuehl, Kenneth J. Beattle, Robert Bee, R.D. Bookout, Crispin Burnham, R. S. Cartwright, Lee Clark, Jason Gridley, Peter F. Guenther, Jonathon William Hodges, Tani Jantsang, J.W. Kelley, D.F. Lewis (Nemonymous), Philip Marsh, Andy Nunez, Brian Nutter, Duane Pesice, Robert M. Price (Crypt of Cthulhu), Joseph S. Pulver (Cthulhu Codex), P.J. Roberts, Ian Rogers, Kevin Eric Sheridan, Ron Shiflet, Kenneth Silver, G.W.Thomas, John H. Toon, Ray Wallace, and Peter A. Worthy (Al-Azif).

== Publisher ==
- Phillip Marsh and Tani Jantsang; Captiva Island, Florida, #1–3
- Phillip Marsh and Tani Jantsang; Lehigh Acres, FL, #4-

== Issues ==
=== No. 4-5 (1996) ===
Cthulhu Cultus No. 4

Cthulhu Cultus No. 5

- Invocation from Beyond by Crispin Burnham
- Illustration of what came from beyond Illustration by Unknown
- Incident in Newark by Tani Jantsang
- Back to the Workshop Illustration by Unknown
- Time to have a Blast Illustration by Unknown
- Cthulhu's Island by James Ambuehl and William Lloyd Breach
- The real Satchmo by Unknown
- The Soul of the Devil-Bought by Robert M. Price
- Primogen by Tani Jantsang
- Do you dare to try this Book ? by Clifford A. Pickover
- Behold the Wonders of the Cthonic World by Unknown
- Shub-Niggurath Speaks by Casey Ley

=== No. 6-8 (1997) ===
Cthulhu Cultus No. 6

- Hungers by Joseph S. Pulver
- One Mean Shrimp Photo
- Whiteout by James Ambuehl and E.P. Berglund
- Beavis and Butt Head read the Necronomicon by Mike Jury
- The Mother of Letters: to Castro – Fidel Castro by unknown
- The Price of a Book by Laurence J. Cornford
- A Letter from a Deconstructionist that deconstructed by unknown
- A Missive from a Daughter of Dagon by Tracy Ambuehl
- Sea Change by James Ambuehl
- Gone Fishing by James Ambuehl
- Introduction to "The Burrowers Beneath" by Robert M. Price
- The Burrowers Beneath by Lin Carter
- The Horror in Red Hook by Tani Jantsang and Malek Homien
- Watching Faye by Joseph S. Pulver
- Feery's Original Notes by Robert M. Price

Cthulhu Cultus No. 7

- Configuration Mythos by Kenneth Silver
- People of the Monolith: Stone of Death by Crispin Burnham
- The Doom of Enos Harker by Lin Carter & J. Cornford
- Alive by Peter A. Worthy
- Dream Rhymes by Leigh Clark
- At Night I play by Chad Hensley
- Nothing Personal by T.J. Phillips
- The War Wake by D.F. Lewis
- The Worm in the Woods by Laurence J. Cornford
- Sha 'No 'Mai by Mik Clarke
- Innsmouth Rules! by Ron Shiflet
- A Collector of Literature by Craig Sernotti
- Ancient One II by Chad Hensley
- The Last Survivor by Sean Rodgers
- The Disappearance of Mordos by Boyd E. Pearson

Cthulhu Cultus No. 8

=== No. 9-13 (1998) ===
Cthulhu Cultus No. 9

- Atlachnaphobia
- I Am Nyarlathotep!
- Innsmouth Harvest
- People of the Monolith
- The Sign of the Yellow Servitor
- The Statue

Cthulhu Cultus No. 10

- People of the Monolith
- Servants of the Coils
- The Tunnels
- The Watchers at the Portal

Cthulhu Cultus No. 11

- A Core Unto Itself
- Beloved
- Crystal from out of Space
- Goddess
- Mythos Rhyme No.1 (HPL) (1st version – prose) by Joseph S. Pulver
- People of the Monolith
- The Steps at Siloth
- The Watchers at the Portal

Cthulhu Cultus No. 12

- A Correlation of Facts Regarding UFO's
- Bishop's Harvest
- Darker
- The Forgotten Ritual of Mnar by Joseph S. Pulver
- Hastur-The-Unspeakable
- Mythos Rhyme No.4 (Chaugnar Faugn) by Joseph S. Pulver
- The Suit
- The Place of the Shoggoths

Cthulhu Cultus No. 13

- Alum Chine
- At the Sound of the Tone
- The Infinite Varieties of Chaos

=== No. 14-16 (1999) ===
Cthulhu Cultus No. 14

- Next Stop
- The Dark Man's Assassin by Ron Shiflet
- The Gemstone
- The Man in Cell Number Thirty-Three
- The Prodigal
- Shadow from the Steeple
- Whipping Boy

Cthulhu Cultus No. 15

- Into the Night by R. D. Bookout
- Briny Bill / Death Walker by Tracy Ambuehl
- The Corporal's Curse by Brain Nutter
- Slithering Doom by Tracy Ambuehl
- Killing of Cthulhu / The Lake by James Ambuehl
- The Bowels of the Earth by Lee Clark and Becca Borgne
- Forbidden Rock by P. J. Roberts
- Todger's Town by DF Lewis
- Shub-Niggurath's Song by Tracy Ambuehl
- The Isle of Chor-Tal by Ron Shiflet
- Ninth Planet / Image from Hubble by Lee Clark
- The Watery Horror by Peter F. Guenther
- Tentacles Dreams / Summoning of Tsathogua by Ron Shiflet
- The Scuttler in the Dark by R. S. Cartwright
- Atlach-Nacha by James Ambuehl
- The Malificent Seven (or Cthulhu & The Indians) by Todd H. C. Fischer
- And No One Heard by Rob Morris

Cthulhu Cultus No. 16

- Catch of the Day by Andy Nunez
- Me and Ed by James Ambuehl
- The Songs of Madness by G. W. Thomas
- The Obelisk by Ron Shiflet
- The Plague by Richard Bookout
- The Bubbling Death by Les Hernandez
- The Only Way to Win is... by J. W. Kelley
- Folks of Innsmouth by Franklyn Searight
