= W. Paul Cook =

American writer (1881-1948)

William Paul Cook (August 31, 1881 – January 22, 1948) was a writer, printer and publisher. He wrote under his own name and the pseudonym Willis T. Crossman, and was a leading figure in amateur journalism. He lived and wrote mostly in Vermont and Massachusetts.

== Biography ==
Cook was born on August 31, 1881, in Mount Tabor, Vermont. His mother died giving birth, and he was raised by his aunt and uncle. He attended Dartmouth but did not graduate.

Among his works is a memoir about H. P. Lovecraft, originally published as In Memoriam: Howard Phillips Lovecraft (Driftwind Press, 1941); Cook typeset this himself. This memoir has been reprinted several times, including by Mirage Press in 1968 under the title H.P. Lovecraft: A Portrait. Cook also wrote stories about Vermont. He met Lovecraft through the National Amateur Press Association, and quickly became a champion of his weird fiction, some of which was first published in Cook's journal, The Vagrant. Cook also broadened Lovecraft's familiarity with supernatural literature by loaning him books and encouraging a systematic study of the field that resulted in Lovecraft's famous essay "Supernatural Horror in Literature," which was first published in Cook's The Recluse (1927), of which only a single issue was published.

In addition to the various journals he published, including The Vagrant, The Recluse, The Revenant, The Ghost, and Monadnock, Cook published books under the Recluse Press imprint. Some of them were by members of the Lovecraft Circle, such as Samuel Loveman, Frank B. Long Jr. (Frank Belknap Long), Donald Wandrei, Walter J. Coates (proprietor of the Driftwind Press), and Lovecraft himself.

Leland Hawes and Sean Donnelly edited a collection of regional stories that Cook wrote under a pseudonym, Willis T. Crossman's Vermont: Stories by W. Paul Cook (published by the University of Tampa Press). Donnelly also edited a companion volume, W. Paul Cook: The Wandering Life of a Yankee Printer, collecting writings by and about Cook, to which he contributed a long biography of Cook and a bibliography of his numerous publications. It was published by Derrick Hussey's Hippocampus Press.
