= Far Away & Never =

Collection of stories by Ramsey Campbell

- Cover of first edition
- Author: Ramsey Campbell
- Cover artist: Stephen E. Fabian
- Language: English
- Genre: Fantasy
- Publisher: Necronomicon Press
- Publication date: 1996
- Publication place: United States
- Media type: Print (paperback)
- Pages: x, 116
- ISBN: 0-940884-86-0
- OCLC: 36766959

Far Away & Never is a collection of fantasy stories by English author Ramsey Campbell. It was first published in trade paperback by Necronomicon Press in July 1996, and later reprinted. A new edition was issued in trade paperback and ebook by DMR Books in October 2021.

== Summary ==
The original edition contains seven short works of fiction by the author, one originally published under a pseudonym, together with an introduction. The first six are set in his mythical world of Tond, and the first four feature his sword and sorcery hero Ryre. The second edition includes an extra story.

== Contents ==
- "Introduction"
- "The Sustenance of Hoak" (from Swords Against Darkness, Feb. 1977)
- "The Changer of Names" (from Swords Against Darkness II, Sep. 1977)
- "The Pit of Wings" (from Swords Against Darkness III, Mar. 1978)
- "The Mouths of Light" (from Swords Against Darkness V, Nov. 1979)
- "The Stages of the God" (as by Montgomery Comfort) (from Whispers #5, Nov. 1974)
- "The Song at the Hub of the Garden" (from Savage Heroes, Feb. 1977)
- "The Ways of Chaos" (written as Part 14 of Ghor, Kin-Slayer (Aug. 1997))
- "A Madness From the Vaults" (second edition only) (from Doubt #1, Oct. 1964)

== Reception ==
Fletcher Vredenburgh on blackgate.com finds the Ryre stories the highlights of the book, "pit[ting] a fierce wandering soldier against a variety of human villains and disturbing, original monsters," with "[e]ach story ... remarkably dark and creepy, and serv[ing] as a potent reminder that the line between S&S and horror can be very thin. In each case the central idea is one that he deemed too outrageous for the real-world horror he was writing at the time." Vredenburgh regards the other two Tond tales as "somewhat dreamy stories ... redolent of Clark Ashton Smith's stories ... but neither is particularly memorable." He considers the collection a "gem of a book."

Matt Cowan, noting that Campbell "has gained his fame primarily as a horror writer," regards the collection as "a rare treat to see how he handled [fantasy]," and "lov[ed] every minute of it." He calls the first four stories, featuring Ryre, "by far my favorites in the book," and "was sad to be done with [them]."

== Awards ==
"The Changer of Names" was nominated for the 1979 British Fantasy Award for Best Short Story.
