= Thomas Ollive Mabbott =

American literary scholar (1898–1968)

Thomas Ollive Mabbott (July 6, 1898 – May 15, 1968) was an American professor and scholar of literature, perhaps best known for his research on writer Edgar Allan Poe. He has also done studies on John Milton, Walt Whitman, Thomas Chatterton, and Edward Coote Pinkney. He also produced important studies based on his collections of coins and fifteenth-century prints.

== Biography ==
Mabbott was born and raised in New York City. He was a Phi Beta Kappa graduate of Columbia University, earning his AB (1920), AM (1921), and Ph.D. (1923) in English. After graduating from Columbia, Mabbott taught English literature and composition at Northwestern University. In 1928, he left Northwestern to teach at Brown. He was there for one year before accepting a position at Hunter College in New York City. Mabbott remained at Hunter as a professor of English and research scholar until 1966. His final two years were spent as a visiting professor at St. John's University.

He may be best remembered as an expert on Edgar Allan Poe, whose works he was in the process of compiling when he died on May 15, 1968, at the age of 69. During his studies, he identified some poetry of Poe originally published anonymously as well as never published manuscripts. His wife took over the project after his death and saw it through to completion.

In 1967, during research for The Complete Works of Poe, Mabbott discovered a lost Walt Whitman poem titled "No Turning Back", one of only four he is known to have written in 1842.

Mabbott also appreciated the horror writing of H. P. Lovecraft. One of his essays on Lovecraft can be found in Lovecraft Remembered.
