= Alfred Galpin =

Alfred Galpin (1901–1983) was an American literary academic and musical composer of classical works. He is now best known as a close friend and correspondent of writer H. P. Lovecraft.

== Life ==
Alfred Galpin was a young prodigy, the son of the banker and inventor Alfred Galpin Jr. (1841–1924) of Appleton, Wisconsin. As a teenager he was mentored by H. P. Lovecraft, who had been alerted to the boy's brilliance by his teacher Maurice W. Moe and his participation in amateur journalism. Lovecraft quickly came to think of Galpin as an honorary "grandson", and nicknamed him "Alfredus"; the two wrote a number of poems for each other and engaged in the Gallomo correspondence circle together. Galpin most notably introduced to Lovecraft the ideas of Friedrich Nietzsche, and the fiction of Clark Ashton Smith.

In the mid-1920s Galpin went to Paris, where he lived the bohemian student life and married a French woman. He attended the Sorbonne in Paris in 1931–1932, thereafter during the 1930s living with his wife in fascist Italy where he was a professional composer and pianist. Upon H. P. Lovecraft's death in 1937 Galpin wrote a moving piece for solo piano, "Lament for H. P.L."

Galpin returned to America in 1939 at the outbreak of the Second World War in Europe. He became professor of French and Italian at The University of Wisconsin in Madison, but toward the end of the war returned to Italy to serve with the military as head of the Office of War Information in Sardinia. He taught at Wisconsin for many decades, publishing papers such as "Italian Echoes in Albert Camus" and several books including De Sanctis On Dante and a volume of the correspondence of Fauriel. His general teaching interest was in French-Italian literary relations after 1800.

He and his wife retired to the Tuscan spa district of Montecatini Terme, where he once more worked on composing his music. His musical scores are now held at the Wisconsin Historical Society. The University of Wisconsin has an annual Alfred and Isabella Panzini Galpin Italian Scholarship award which is named in his honour.

Galpin's correspondence with H. P. Lovecraft was collected as: Letters to Alfred Galpin, Hippocampus Press 2003. Galpin wrote a memoir of Lovecraft, "Memories of a Friendship".

== Academic works ==
- The Epithet as a Means of Dramatic Technique in the Tragedies of Racine (1926)
- The Development of Skryabin's Harmonic Technique (1930)
- Intermediate Readings in French Prose (1955)
- De Sanctis On Dante (1957)
- Fauriel in Italy: Correspondence, 1822–1825 (1962)
- Fauriel in Italy: Unpublished Correspondence 1882–1825 (1962)
- Beginning Readings in Italian (1966)
