= Leland Hawes =

American journalist (1929–2013)

Leland Mosley Hawes Jr.
- Born: June 18, 1929; Tampa, Florida, U.S.
- Died: May 18, 2013 (aged 83)
- Education: University of Florida
- Occupation: Newspaper reporter
- Awards: Hillsborough County Bar Association Liberty Bell Award (1989)

Leland Mosley Hawes Jr. (June 18, 1929 – May 18, 2013) was an American newspaper reporter for the Tampa Tribune. He had a long tenure at the paper and was involved in various projects after leaving the paper, including serving on the committee that selected the first six historical figures to be immortalized in bronze busts along the Tampa Riverwalk. The Hillsborough County Bar Association awarded him with its Liberty Bell Award in 1989.

Hawes was born in Tampa on June 18, 1929. He graduated from Plant High School and the University of Florida. He began working at the Tampa Times in 1950 and joined the Tampa Tribune in 1952

His tenure at the Tribune included 20 years as writer and editor of the "History & Heritage" section of the Sunday edition. He collaborated on the production of a book of W. Paul Cook's stories. He was a long time hobbyist at amateur journalism since he was 12, the age in which he printed his own neighborhood newspaper. He also published two private journals as an adult.

The Tampa Bay History Center and the University of South Florida established the Leland Hawes Prize, a juried essay competition for graduate and undergraduate students in the humanities. He served for many years as a trustee of the Marjorie Kinnan Rawlings Society, an organization dedicated to promoting the work of Florida's emblematic novelist.

He conducted an interview with the University of Florida in 2002.
