= Crypt of Cthulhu =

Fanzine of HP Lovecraft works

- Editor: Robert M. Price
- Categories: H. P. Lovecraft, Cthulhu Mythos
- Publisher: Cryptic Publications; Necronomicon Press; Mythos Books
- Founder: Robert M. Price
- Founded: 1981
- Country: USA
- Based in: West Warwick, Rhode Island
- Language: English
- ISSN: 1077-8179
- OCLC: 14210534

Crypt of Cthulhu is an American fanzine devoted to the writings of H. P. Lovecraft and the Cthulhu Mythos. It was published as part of the Esoteric Order of Dagon amateur press association for a short time, and was formally established in 1981 by Robert M. Price, who edited it throughout its subsequent run.

Described by its editor as "a bizarre miscegenation; half Lovecraft Studies rip-off, half humor magazine, a 'pulp thriller and theological journal,'" it was a great deal more than that. Lovecraft scholarship was always a mainstay, with articles contributed by Steve Behrends, Edward P. Berglund, Peter Cannon, Stefan Dziemianowicz, S. T. Joshi, Robert A. W. Lowndes, Dirk W. Mosig, Will Murray, Darrell Schweitzer, Colin Wilson and Price himself. However the magazine published stories and poems too: resurrected, newly discovered, or in a few cases newly written, by Lovecraft and other such Weird Tales veterans as R. H. Barlow, Robert Bloch, Hugh B. Cave, August Derleth, C. M. Eddy, Jr., Robert E. Howard, Carl Jacobi, Henry Kuttner, Frank Belknap Long, E. Hoffmann Price, Duane W. Rimel, Richard F. Searight, Clark Ashton Smith and Wilfred Blanch Talman. It also had stories and poems by newer writers paying tribute to the old, including Ramsey Campbell, Lin Carter, John Glasby, C. J. Henderson, T. E. D. Klein, Thomas Ligotti, Brian Lumley, Gary Myers and Richard L. Tierney. Several issues were devoted to showcasing one or another of such authors. Its contents were illustrated by such artists of the fantastic as Thomas Brown, Jason C. Eckhardt, Stephen E. Fabian, D. L. Hutchinson, Robert H. Knox, Allen Koszowski, Gavin O'Keefe and Gahan Wilson. Its reviews covered genre books, films and games.

The magazine's initial run encompassed 107 issues over a span of 20 years. The first 75 issues (dated Hallowmas 1981 through Michaelmas 1990), were published by Price under his own Cryptic Publications imprint. The next 26 issues, (dated Hallowmas 1990 through Eastertide 1999 and numbered 76 through 101) were published by Necronomicon Press. The last 6 issues, (dated Lammas 1999 through Eastertide 2001 and numbered 102 through 107), were published by Mythos Books. The magazine was inactive after 2001; however, Necronomicon Press revived it in 2017 with issue 108 (dated Hallomas 2017). They published thru issue #113 (dated Lammas 2019). Then Price restarted Cryptic Publications and started publishing it again with #114 (St John's Eve 2022)
