= H. P. Lovecraft: A Life =

Biography of H. P. Lovecraft by S. T. Joshi

- Cover of the first edition
- Author: S. T. Joshi
- Language: English
- Subject: H. P. Lovecraft
- Publisher: Necronomicon Press
- Publication date: 1996
- Publication place: United States
- Media type: Print (Hardcover and Paperback)
- Pages: 704

H. P. Lovecraft: A Life is a biography of American writer H. P. Lovecraft by S. T. Joshi, first published by Necronomicon Press in 1996. The original one-volume edition was reissued in 2004, with a new afterword by Joshi.

A new revised/uncut edition (as I Am Providence: The Life and Times of H.P. Lovecraft) (2 vols) was issued in 2010 (Hippocampus Press); this restores 150,000 words cut for space reasons from the original edition, and is also thoroughly revised and updated in regard to new information on Lovecraft that has come to light since 1996.

The book largely supplants earlier efforts such as L. Sprague de Camp's Lovecraft: A Biography (1975). According to his website, Joshi regards this book his most notable achievement to date, followed by his The Weird Tale.

== Reception ==
When first published in 1996, H. P. Lovecraft: A Life was regarded as a "meticulously researched" biography of Lovecraft, taking account of all currently known facts about Lovecraft's life and work. It was met with critical praise; it elicited favorable comments from the horror author Ramsey Campbell and literary critic Harold Bloom, and received a long and favorable review in The New York Review of Books from author Joyce Carol Oates, who called it "the definitive biography".

== Awards ==
H.P. Lovecraft: A Life was awarded the 1997 Bram Stoker Award for Best Non-Fiction from the Horror Writers Association.
