= Gallomo =

Literary correspondence

Gallomo was the name of a circle of literary correspondence between Alfred Galpin, H. P. Lovecraft, and Maurice W. Moe in the first few decades of the 20th century. The name is derived from the first syllable of each author's last name. Lovecraft often used the group to workshop stories which he was working on, such as "The Statement of Randolph Carter". The other two members went on to publish stories in magazines such as The Vagrant, The Californian, or All-Story Magazine.

== Literary correspondence circle ==
The literary correspondence consisted of round-robin cycles, in which the members would sequentially write letters discussing one or more issues. As the collection of letters circulated to each member, the member would remove their previous letter and write a new letter which commented on the letters of the others.

== Members of the Gallomo ==
=== Alfred Galpin ===
Alfred Galpin (1901–1983) was an American literary academic and musical composer of classical works. Part of his career was in Paris and Italy, but he was a professor at Wisconsin University for many decades. He was a close friend and correspondent of H. P. Lovecraft.

=== H. P. Lovecraft ===
Howard Phillips "H. P." Lovecraft (August 20, 1890 – March 15, 1937) was an American author who achieved posthumous fame through his influential works of horror fiction. He is regarded as one of the most significant 20th-century authors in his genre.

=== Maurice W. Moe ===
Maurice Winter Moe (1882–1940) was an American amateur journalist and English teacher. He attended the University of Wisconsin, graduating in 1904, and was an English teacher at Appleton High School in Appleton, Wisconsin and also at West Division High School in Milwaukee, Wisconsin. Maurice knew H. P. Lovecraft starting in 1914, and notified him of his outstanding student Alfred Galpin. Because Maurice was fervently pious, the truth and efficacy of religion were frequent topics of discussion in the correspondence circle. Maurice was also a member of the other correspondence circle Kleicomolo (Rheinhart Kleiner, Ira A. Cole, Maurice W. Moe, and H. P. Lovecraft).
