= Terry Cisco =

Electrical engineer

Terry Cisco is an electrical engineer from CAED Co. in Glendale, California. Cisco was named a Fellow of the Institute of Electrical and Electronics Engineers (IEEE) in 2016 for his work in the development of airborne active array transmit and receive module technologies.
