= Horror fandom =

Fan subculture dedicated to horror

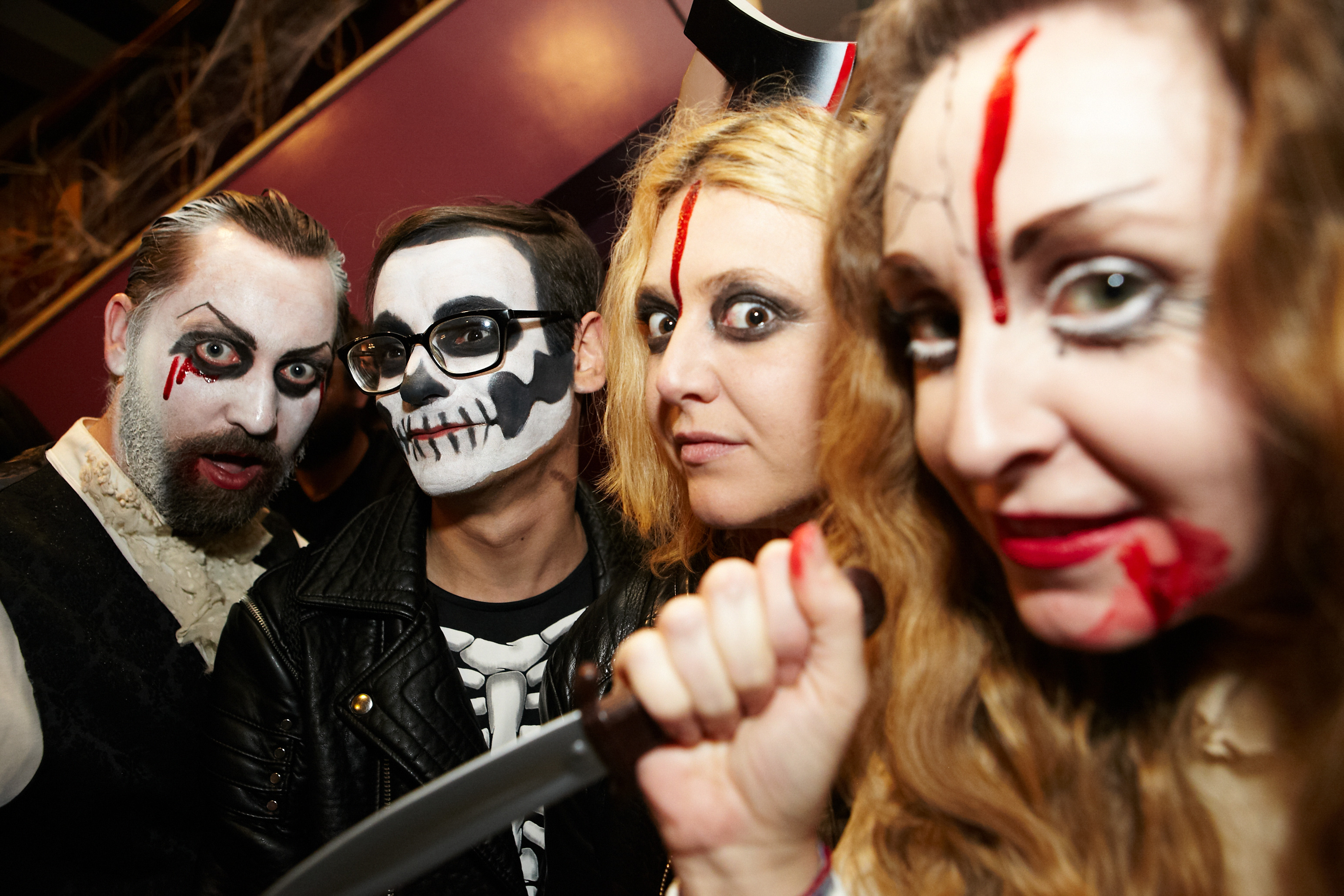
Fans at an event in San Sebastián

Horror fandom is a fandom dedicated to the horror genre. This fan culture has significant overlap with the science fiction and fantasy fandoms.

The horror genre has been adapted into numerous forms of media, including literature (including anime, comics, and magazines), film and television, games, podcasts, and music. The genre remains a staple of modern culture, with horror figures such as Count Dracula or the more contemporary Jason Voorhees being household names.

== Demographics ==
The horror fandom is tied to many alternative subcultures, notably goth, punk and queer subcultures. Themes of "otherness" have allowed for people of these subcultures to find the genre a form of catharsis, and form a community around the genre.

Early exposure to horror, including to child-oriented horror media such as Scooby-Doo, has been attributed to enjoying horror later in life.

== Organization ==
The horror fandom has organized itself in many different forms, including events and media to celebrate the genre.

=== Conventions ===
Horror conventions are events in which fans of the horror genre, as well as professionals in the field, can gather and interact. Similar to other fan conventions, the events may include cosplay, events, booths, and celebrity guests.

=== Media ===
The horror fandom has expanded into a number of mediums, including television, literature, and music.

==== Gaming ====
Horror video games are a long-running genre of video games. Long-lasting series' like Resident Evil and Silent Hill are increasingly popular with horror and non-horror fans.

The video game Dead by Daylight incorporates many iconic characters of the horror genre, such as Michael Myers, Leatherface, and Ghostface, and has a very large, active player base.

==== Music ====
Horror-themed bands, including those of the horror punk genre, have become increasingly popular. A notable example is Ice Nine Kills, an American heavy metal band that creates song based on popular horror franchises.

==== Online community ====
Horror forums and horror websites attract significant numbers of users, with dedicated horror sites like Bloody Disgusting reaching approx. 20 million users annually. Fan projects, such as r/nosleep and the SCP Foundation, allow for horror fans online to create their own horror works.

Podcasts and YouTube channels discussing horror have become popular, such as Dead Meat.

==== Television ====
In television, horror hosts became a staple of the horror fandom. Horror hosts typically would adopt a horror persona and host a television show broadcasting horror films, with notable examples being Vampira, Elvira, and Vincent Price. A modern example is The Boulet Brothers, a pair of horror-themed drag queens that host their own televised drag competition, The Boulet Brothers' Dragula.

== In fiction ==
- Nightmare in Blood - 1978 horror film set at a horror-film convention
- Randy Meeks - a character in the Scream franchise with a passion for horror

== See also ==
- History of horror films
- Scream queen, scream king, and final girl - common terminology in the horror fandom
- Category:Horror film characters
