= Amateur journalism =

Hobby for starting small newspapers

Amateur journalism is a hobby of writing, publishing, and printing. It is usually done through small journals or papers.

The hobby was more formally established after the U.S. Civil War, with the availability of small and inexpensive printing presses. Local circulation and exchanges, called amateur press associations exist at the national, regional, and local levels. Conventions are also held with several such groups. The hobby waxed and waned in the early 20th century, achieving a literary peak under the influence of H. P. Lovecraft and W. Paul Cook in the 1915–1925 period. The 1930s brought a redevelopment of interest, with a mix of fine printing with quality material and crude leaflets from small hand-presses and mimeographs.

Membership in associations has diminished to the hundreds in the United States and Canada, and many members are elderly, as safety rules for motorized presses and hand-setting type have become lost arts. However, many hobbies make use of personal printers connected to computers, or make use of printing services by others. Many amateur press associations have now gone electronic, but not all.

To a degree, blogging has come with the advent of the internet and somewhat supplanted it. Amateur journalism should not be confused with citizen journalism, as amateur journalism is not focused on reporting the news. Amateur journalists may write non-fiction essays and reports, fiction, or poetry.

Retired Tampa Tribune reporter Leland Hawes is an aficionado.

== See also ==
- Amateur press association
