= NecronomiCon Providence =

Convention about H.P. Lovecraft's work)

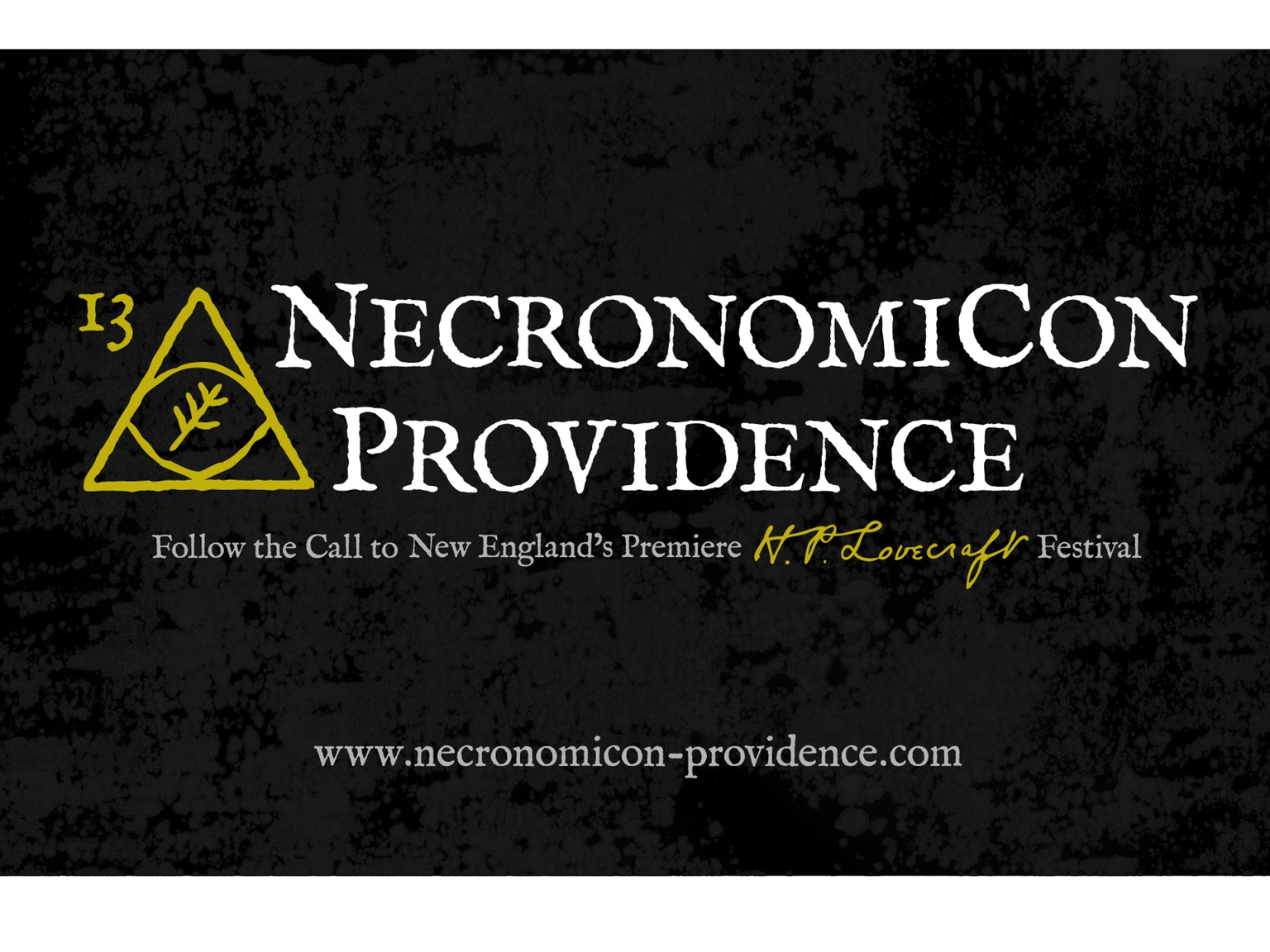
- Status: Active
- Genre: Weird fiction
- Begins: August 13, 2026; 2 months ago
- Ends: August 16, 2026
- Frequency: Bi-annually
- Venue: Biltmore Hotel Providence and Omni Hotels
- Location: Providence, Rhode Island
- Country: United States
- Years active: 13
- Inaugurated: August 22, 2013
- Most recent: August 15, 2024; 2 years ago
- Website: necronomicon-providence.com

The NecronomiCon Providence, also known as the NecronomiCon Providence: The International Conference and Festival of Weird Fiction, Art, and Academia, is a biennial convention and academic conference held in Providence, Rhode Island. It explores the life and works of H. P. Lovecraft and other creators of weird fiction, film, and art of the past and the present. Originally billed as "the largest celebration ever of [Lovecraft's] work and influence", it has broadened its scope to examining and celebrating weird creative efforts internationally. The event is typically held on the weekend closest to Lovecraft's birthday of August 20th.

Event programming is held primarily at the Biltmore Hotel Providence and Omni Hotels, with additional events held in downtown Providence, the John Hay Library, and adjacent College Hill sites. The event is organized by the Lovecraft Arts & Sciences Council, which also runs the store Lovecraft Arts & Sciences.

== History ==
The first NecronomiCon Providence was held on August 22-25, 2013, and was the successor to the earlier "NecronomiCon: The Cthulhu Mythos Convention" that has been founded and organized by The Lovecraft Society of New England biannually from 1993–2001, led by Franklin Hummel (founder of the Gaylaxian Network), attorney Joan Stanley, and Necronomicon Press publisher Marc Michaud. Funding to launch the event was partially raised through a successful Kickstarter crowdfunding campaign. The first event was successful and attracted attendees from outside Rhode Island and the United States, and the Lovecraft Arts & Sciences Council reported an attendance of over 1300 attendees and guests.

The 2021 convention was postponed due to the COVID-19 pandemic, resulting in a three-year gap between the 2019 and 2022 events.

== Programming ==
Programming for the event consists of academic talks, symposiums, panels, author reading, and showings of Lovecraftian art, theater, and film works. The event also hosts live gaming events and a vendor room. Panels cover a wide range of topics examining the life and relationships of weird fiction authors "Men of their Time: The Correspondence and Relationship of H. P. Lovecraft and James F. Morton", themes and tropes in weird fiction and film "Deterministic Landscapes: The Role of Psychogeography in Weird Fiction", and the history of the genre from multiple perspectives "Out of the Shadows: A History of the Queer Weird." In addition, panels discuss literary craft and theory "Not Just Three Acts: Narrative Structure and the Weird" and subjects related to gaming and game design "Everyone Dies or Goes Insane: Survival and Consequences in Horror Gaming."

The convention hosts the "Dr. Henry Armitage Memorial Scholarship Symposium" where scholarly works on Lovecraft and his writings are presented. Articles based on the presentations are reprinted as the Lovecraftian Proceedings series by Hippocampus Press.

Philip Gelatt serves as the director of the convention film track.

In addition to the regular convention program there are community events before, after and during the convention that are Lovecraft centered, which include walking and bus tours of Lovecraftian sites around Providence. Other special events include the Opening Ceremony, the Eldritch Ball (fancy dress and masquerade), and the Cthulhu Prayer Breakfast. The Cthulhu Prayer Breakfast is an installment from the previous NecronomiCons, hosted in Providence and Danvers, set up as a Prayer Gathering on Sunday mornings.
