= Lovecraft: A Biography =

1975 biography of H. P. Lovecraft by L. Sprague de Camp

- Dust-jacket for Lovecraft: A Biography
- Author: L. Sprague de Camp
- Cover artist: Nicholas Gaetano
- Language: English
- Publisher: Doubleday
- Publication date: 1975
- Publication place: United States
- Media type: Print (Hardback)
- Pages: xvi, 480 pp
- ISBN: 0-385-00578-4
- OCLC: 979196
- Dewey Decimal: 813/.5/2 B
- LC Class: PS3523.O833 Z59

Lovecraft: A Biography is a 1975 biography of the writer H. P. Lovecraft by science-fiction writer L. Sprague de Camp, first published in hardcover by Doubleday in February 1975.

== Criticisms and de Camp's responses ==
The biography, a warts-and-all examination of the famous horror and science-fiction writer, was the first major independent biography of Lovecraft. De Camp's approach has been called frank and judicious by some, unflattering and unbalanced by others. Lovecraft's attitude towards his writing was resolutely non-commercial: he never mastered touch typing or systematically searched for paying markets. de Camp felt that it was folly for Lovecraft to pretend to be a gentleman-amateur without the capital to fund his lifestyle, to which one reviewer replied that Lovecraft seemed happy to live in poverty writing for his own amusement and that of his close friends.

De Camp himself considered some of the criticism of his book as expressed in reviews of the hardcover had merit, and accordingly altered the text in the paperback edition to take account of these criticisms. Altogether, de Camp cut about 13,000–16,000 "repetitions, digressions and speculative obiter dicta" from the paperback edition. On the requirement of the publisher he also "eliminated the notes section, bibliography and index," an excision he was reportedly unhappy about.

== Editions and translations ==
A later hardcover edition was issued by Barnes & Noble in January 1996. The first paperback edition, corrected and abridged by the author, was published by Ballantine Books in August 1976. The first British edition was published by New English Library in 1976. An E-book edition of the Ballantine version of the work was published by Gollancz's SF Gateway imprint on September 29, 2011, as part of a general release of de Camp's works in electronic form.

The book has also been translated into German, Russian, and several other languages.

== Awards ==
The book was nominated for the 1976 World Fantasy Award, Special Award (Professional), and placed fourth in the 1976 Locus Poll Award for Best Associational Item.

== Relation to other works ==
De Camp's Lovecraft biography was preceded by August Derleth's biography H.P.L.: A Memoir (1945), and has now been largely superseded by S.T. Joshi's more comprehensive treatment I Am Providence (Hippocampus Press, 2 vols, 2010) (first published in abridged form by Necronomicon Press, 1996, as H. P. Lovecraft: A Life), which draws on decades of further scholarship by Joshi and others.
