= Fantasy fandom =

Aspect of fandom

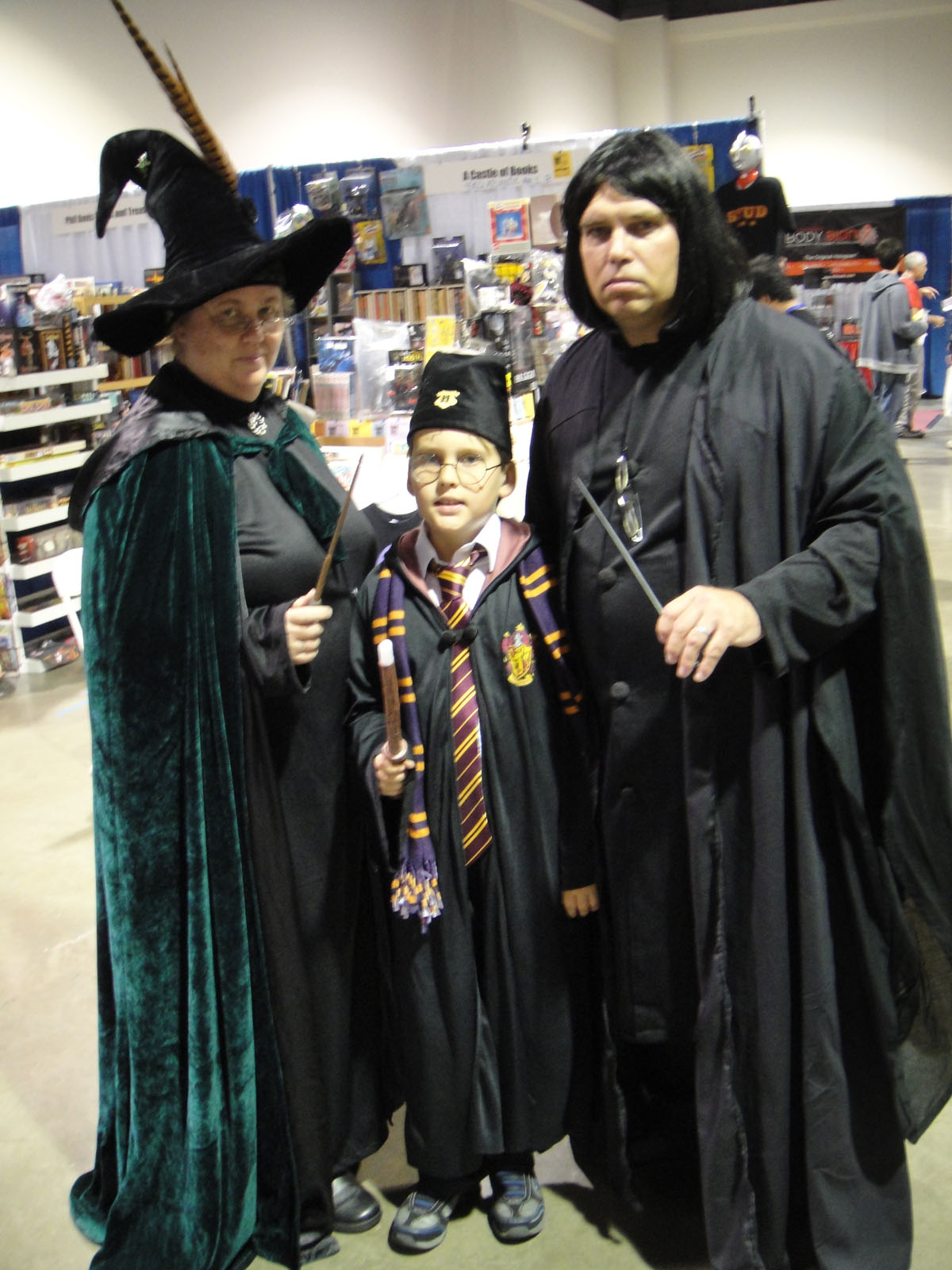
Harry Potter fans cosplaying as characters from the franchise.

Fantasy fandom is a fandom and commonality of fans of the fantasy genre. It revolves around popular media franchises belonging to the fantasy genre and can include collective fan works of these fantasy franchises and events that celebrate franchises of the genre as well as characters belonging to that genre.

Examples of fan clubs devoted to stories and franchises of fantasy and include Disneyana fanclub, and The Tolkien Society in appreciation of works by J. R. R. Tolkien. Fandom communities also exist on the Internet.

== See also ==
- Fantasy Fan, the first American magazine in the genre of fantasy and weird fiction.
- World Fantasy Convention
- Science fiction fandom
- Furry fandom
