= Dirk W. Mosig =

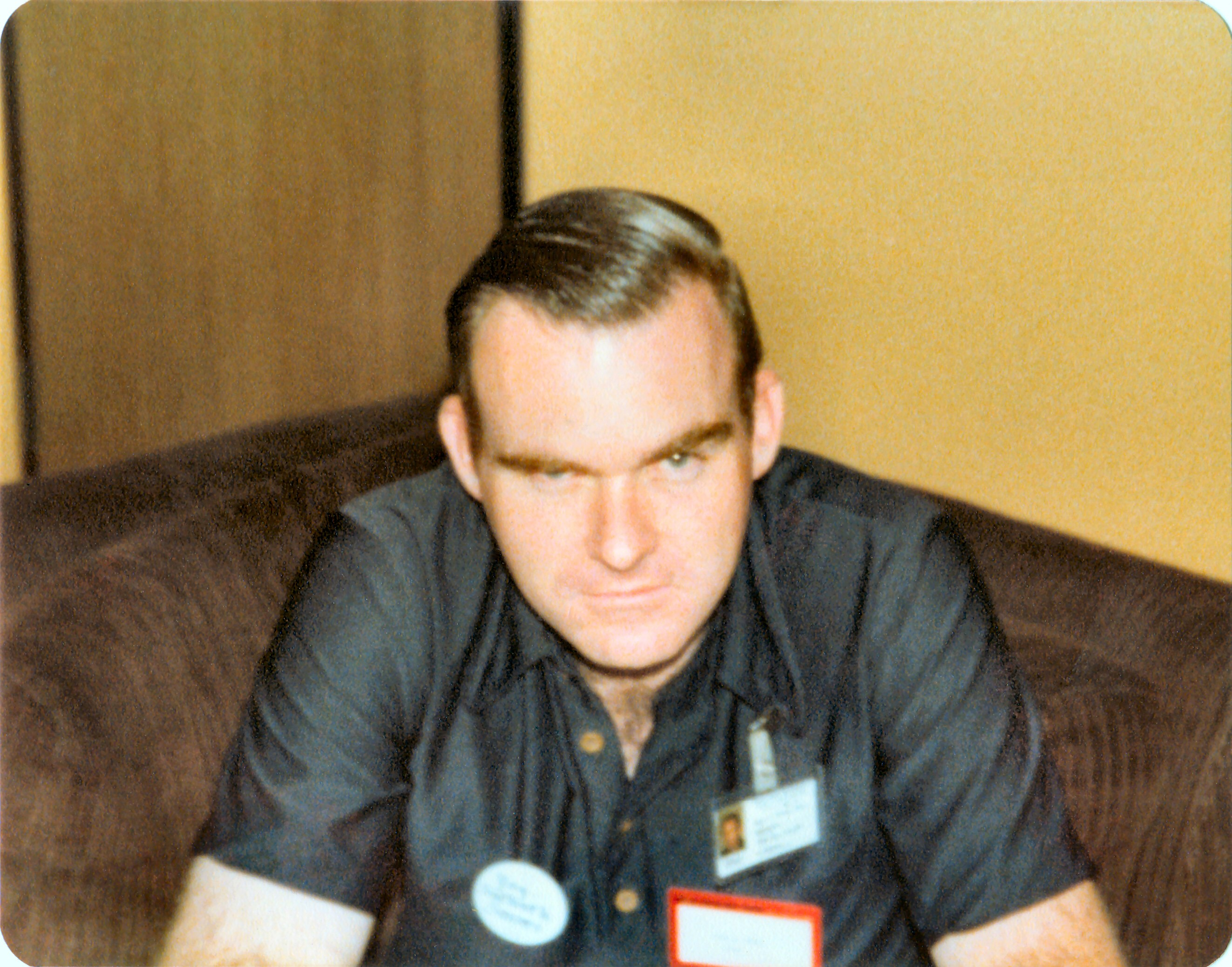
- Mosig at 1978 IguanaCon II, photo by Will Hart
- Born: 1943 (age 82–83); Germany
- Education: University of Florida
- Occupations: Psychologist, historian, literary critic

Yōzan Dirk W. Mosig (born 1943) is a psychologist, historian, literary critic and ordained Zen monk noted for his critical work on H. P. Lovecraft. He was born in Germany and lived for several years in Argentina before emigrating to the United States. He received his Ph.D at the University of Florida in 1974.

Between 1973 and 1978, Mosig published numerous important essays assessing Lovecraft's work.

To cite but three, Mosig's 1973 essay "Toward a Greater Appreciation of H.P. Lovecraft: The Analytical Approach" is a psychological interpretation (based on the theories of C.G. Jung) of many Lovecraft stories.

The pioneering and oft-reprinted "H. P. Lovecraft: Myth Maker" (1976) explores Lovecraft's philosophy of horror, takes issue with August Derleth's distorted interpretation of Lovecraft's myth-cycle and emphasises the latter's vision of an amoral cosmos in which humanity has little significance.

In "Lovecraft: The Dissonance Factor in Imaginative Literature" (1979), insanity is the result of a fatal cognitive dissonance in the protagonist caused by encounters with cosmic horrors that contradict the protagonist's (and the reader's) worldview of the universe and its laws.

Several of Mosig's essays assessed individual works by Lovecraft such as "The Outsider" and "The White Ship" according to a psychoanalytical perspective. One essay analyzed Lovecraft's poem "The City".

S. T. Joshi has stated that "Dirk Mosig is the key transitional figure in Lovecraft studies; and if the history of this field is ever written, he will have to occupy a central role."

For over forty years, Mosig taught various undergraduate and graduate courses in psychology at the University of Nebraska at Kearney, where he was also engaged in research on the Punic Wars and the career of Hannibal. He now holds the rank of professor emeritus at the university.

The volume, Mosig at Last: A Psychologist Looks at Lovecraft (West Warwick, RI: Necronomicon Press, August 1997), collects Mosig's previously published Lovecraft papers and adds some previously unpublished, such as "Life After Lovecraft: Reminiscences of a Non-Entity" (reflections on his life as a Lovecraft scholar). Also included is "Growing Up Lovecraftian" by Mosig's daughter, Laila Briquet-Mosig.
