= Hippocampus Press =

American specialty small press

- Founded: 1999
- Founder: Derrick Hussey
- Country of origin: United States
- Headquarters location: New York City
- Publication types: Books, journals
- Fiction genres: fantasy, horror and science fiction
- Official website: hippocampuspress.com

Hippocampus Press is an American publisher that specializes in "the works of H. P. Lovecraft and his literary circle". Founded in 1999 and based in New York City, Hippocampus is operated by founder Derrick Hussey.

As of 2017, it has issued over 200 publications, including editions of the complete fiction, essays, and poetry of Lovecraft, and thirteen volumes in the ongoing series of Lovecraft's Collected Letters.

In 2014, Publishers Weekly said Hippocampus Press is "the world's leading publisher of books related to horror writer H. P. Lovecraft".

== Output ==
Hippocampus has also published previously unavailable weird fiction by Lord Dunsany (The Pleasures of a Futuroscope, The Ghost in the Corner and Other Stories), as well as the "Lovecraft's Library" series, which collects works by authors who influenced Lovecraft but have since fallen out of fashion, such as Algernon Blackwood, George Sterling and M. P. Shiel.

Hippocampus Press also publishes the periodicals Dead Reckonings: A Review of Horror and the Weird in the Arts, The Lovecraft Annual, Lovecraftian Proceedings (papers presented at NecronomiCon Providence), Spectral Realms (devoted to weird and fantastic verse), and Penumbra: A Journal of Weird Fiction and Criticism (features contemporary weird fiction, verse, and scholarly articles).

== Awards ==
In 2011, Hippocampus Press was awarded the Horror Writers Association's Specialty Press Award.
