= The Hounds of Tindalos (book) =

1946 collection of short stories by Frank Belknap Long

- Dust-jacket illustration by Hannes Bok for The Hounds of Tindalos
- Author: Frank Belknap Long
- Cover artist: Hannes Bok
- Language: English
- Genre: Fantasy, horror, science fiction
- Publisher: Arkham House
- Publication date: 1946
- Publication place: United States
- Media type: Print (hardback)
- Pages: 316

The Hounds of Tindalos is a collection of fantasy, horror and science fiction short stories by American writer Frank Belknap Long. It was released in 1946 and was the author's third book. It was published by Arkham House in an edition of 2,602 copies with cover art by Hannes Bok. A British hardcover was issued by Museum Press in 1950. Belmont Books reprinted The Hounds of Tindalos in two paperback volumes, The Hounds of Tindalos (1963) and The Dark Beasts (1964), omitting three stories; Panther Books issued a complete two-volume British paperback edition as The Hounds of Tindalos (1975) and The Black Druid (1975).

The 1975 Doubleday collection The Early Long may be considered as crucially supplemental to the Arkham House volume, since while it comprises only seventeen of the twenty-one stories in the Arkham House book, it adds "an excellent introduction and head notes" written by Long. (The 1978 paperback edition of The Early Long was retitled The Hounds of Tindalos.)

== Contents ==
The Hounds of Tindalos contains the following tales:

1. "A Visitor from Egypt" (Weird Tales, 1930)
2. "The Refugees" (Unknown, 1942)
3. "Fisherman's Luck" (Unknown, 1940)
4. "Death-Waters" (Weird Tales, 1924)
5. "Grab Bags are Dangerous" (Unknown, 1942)
6. "The Elemental" (Unknown, 1939)
7. "The Peeper" (Weird Tales, 1944)
8. "Bridgehead" (Astounding Stories, 1944)
9. "Second Night Out" (Weird Tales, 1933)
10. "The Dark Beasts" (Marvel Tales, 1934)
11. "Census Taker" (Unknown, 1942)
12. "The Ocean Leach" (Weird Tales, 1925)
13. "The Space-Eaters" (Weird Tales, 1928)
14. "It Will Come to You" (Unknown, 1942)
15. "A Stitch in Time" (Super Science Stories, 1940)
16. "Step into My Garden" (Unknown, 1942)
17. "The Hounds of Tindalos" (Weird Tales, 1929)
18. "Dark Vision" (Unknown, 1939)
19. "The Flame Midget" (Astounding Stories, 1936)
20. "Golden Child" (Thrilling Wonder Stories, 1945)
21. "The Black Druid" (Weird Tales, 1930)

"Second Night Out" was originally published as "The Black Dead Thing". "Golden Child" was originally published as "The Sculp", under the byline Leslie Northern.

== Reception ==
E. F. Bleiler wrote that "While the earlier material is now interesting mostly for nostalgic reasons, the stories written in Long's maturer period, the late 1930s on, are noteworthy for the concrete, tangible, yet highly moving horrors that permeate them.

== Sources ==
- Jaffery, Sheldon (1989). The Arkham House Companion. Mercer Island, WA: Starmont House, Inc. p. 16. ISBN 1-55742-005-X.
- Chalker, Jack L.; Mark Owings (1998). The Science-Fantasy Publishers: A Bibliographic History, 1923-1998. Westminster, MD and Baltimore: Mirage Press, Ltd. pp. 28–29.
- Joshi, S.T. (1999). Sixty Years of Arkham House: A History and Bibliography. Sauk City, WI: Arkham House. pp. 32–33. ISBN 0-87054-176-5.
- Nielsen, Leon (2004). Arkham House Books: A Collector's Guide. Jefferson, NC and London: McFarland & Company, Inc. p. 56. ISBN 0-7864-1785-4.
