= Frank Belknap Long =

American novelist, short story writer, and poet

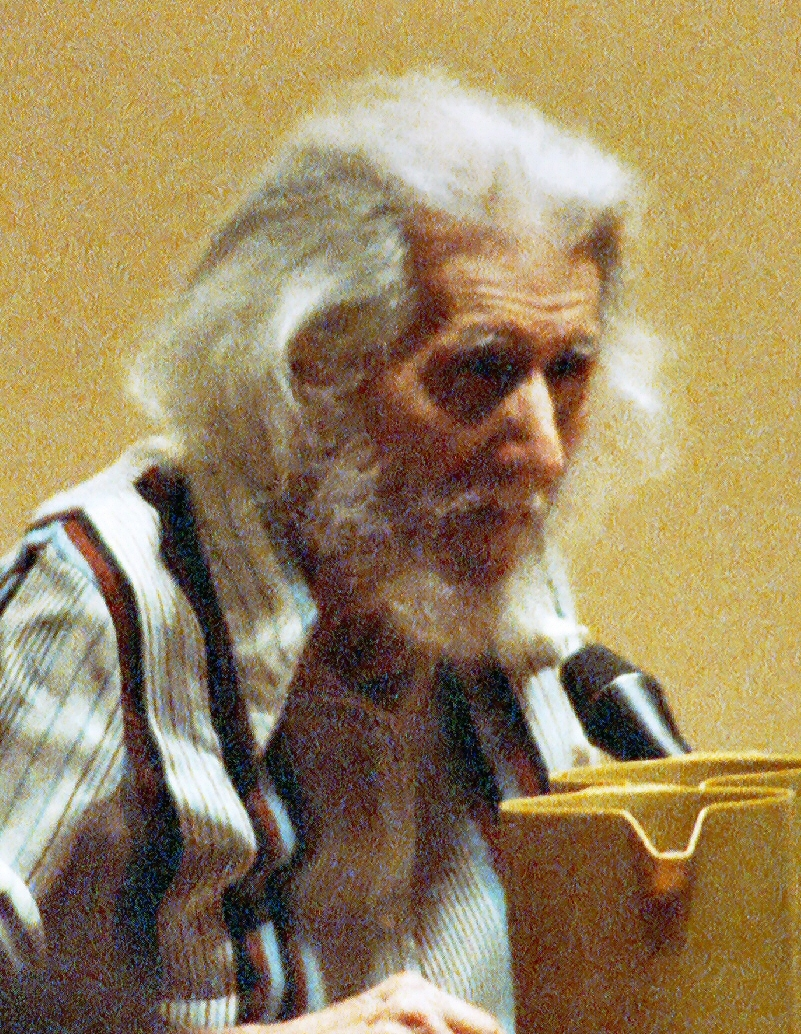
- Frank Belknap Long in 1990
- Born: Frank Belknap Long; April 27, 1901; New York City, U.S.
- Died: January 3, 1994 (aged 92); New York City, U.S.
- Resting place: Woodlawn Cemetery
- Writing career
- Pen name: Leslie Northern; Lyda Belknap Long
- Genres: American writer, comic, fantasy, Gothic romance, horror, non-fiction, poetry, science fiction

Frank Belknap Long Jr. (April 27, 1901 – January 3, 1994) was an American writer of horror fiction, fantasy, science fiction, poetry, gothic romance, comic books, and non-fiction. Though his writing career spanned seven decades, he is best known for his horror and science fiction short stories, including contributions to the Cthulhu Mythos alongside his friend, H. P. Lovecraft. During his life, Long received the World Fantasy Award for Life Achievement (at the 1978 World Fantasy Convention), the Bram Stoker Award for Lifetime Achievement (in 1987, from the Horror Writers Association), and the First Fandom Hall of Fame Award (1977).

== Biography ==
=== Early life and education ===
Long was born in Manhattan, New York City on April 27, 1901. He grew up in the Harlem area of Manhattan, residing at 823 West End Avenue. His father was a prosperous dentist and his mother was May Doty. Long's father was a keen fisher and hunter, and Long accompanied the family on annual summer vacations from the age of six months to 17. Trips were usually in the Thousand Islands region on the Canadian shore, about seven miles from the village of Gananoque. When he was three years old, on one of these vacations, Long fell into the river at the end of a long pier and contracted pneumonia.

A lifelong resident of New York City, Long was educated in the New York City public school system. In his autobiographical introduction to his collection The Early Long he recalls: "After graduating from PS24, just north of Mt Morris Park in Harlem, I attended De Witt Clinton High School for four years and managed to graduate despite a spectacular lack of competence in algebra and geometry". As a boy he was fascinated by natural history, and wrote that he dreamed of running "away from home and explore the great rain forests of the Amazon." He developed his interest in the weird by reading the Oz books, Jules Verne, and H.G. Wells, as well as Ambrose Bierce and Edgar Allan Poe. Though writing was to be his life's work, he once commented that as "important as writing is, I could have been completely happy if I had a secure position in a field that has always had a tremendous emotion and an imaginative appeal for me—that of natural history."

In his late teens, Long was active in the United Amateur Press Association (UAPA) in which he won a prize from The Boy's World (around 1919) and thus discovered amateur journalism. His first published tale was "Dr Whitlock's Price (United Amateur, March 1920). Long's story in UAPA, "The Eye Above the Mantel" (1921), a pastiche of Edgar Allan Poe caught the eye of H. P. Lovecraft, sparking a friendship and correspondence that would endure until Lovecraft's death in 1937.

Long attended the Washington Square branch of New York University from 1920 to 1921, studying commerce and journalism. He later transferred to Columbia, leaving without a degree. In 1921, he suffered a severe attack of appendicitis, leading to a ruptured appendix and peritonitis. He spent a month in New York's Roosevelt Hospital, where he came close to dying (an experience recounted in his poem "In Hospital." Long's brush with death propelled him into the decision to leave college and pursue a freelance writing career.

=== Early career: the 1920s ===
In 1924, at the age of 22, he sold his first short story, "The Desert Lich", to Weird Tales magazine. Throughout the next four decades, Long was to be a frequent contributor to pulp magazines, including two of the most famous: Weird Tales (under editor Farnsworth Wright) and Astounding Science Fiction (under editor John W. Campbell). Long was an active freelance writer, also publishing many non-fiction articles.

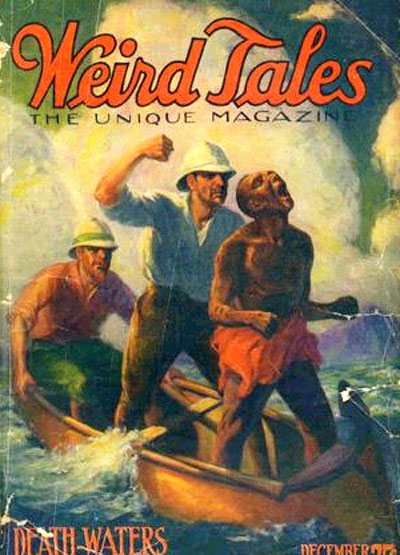
Long's second Weird Tales story, "Deadly Waters", was featured on the cover of the December 1924 issue.

His first book, the scarce volume A Man from Genoa and Other Poems, was published in 1926 by W. Paul Cook when Long was aged but 26. Two copies are held in the collections of John Hay Library. The poems in this collection are said to have won praise from a great variety of writers, among them Arthur Machen, Robinson Jeffers, William Ellery Leonard, John Drinkwater, John Masefield and George Sterling. Samuel Loveman declared that Long's poem "The Marriage of Sir John de Mandeville" was worthy of Christopher Marlowe.

Long's closest friends (apart from H. P. Lovecraft) in this period included Samuel Loveman, H. Warner Munn, and James F. Morton. He had several encounters with Hart Crane, who lived one flight above Loveman in Brooklyn Heights.

=== 1930s ===
"The Horror from the Hills", a story serialised in 1931 in Weird Tales, incorporated almost verbatim a dream H. P. Lovecraft related to him (among other correspondents) in a letter. The short novel was published many years later in separate book form by Arkham House in 1963, as The Horror from the Hills.

In the late 1930s, Long turned his hand to science fiction, writing for Astounding Science Fiction. He also contributed horror stories to Unknown (later called Unknown Worlds). Long contributed an episode (along with C.L. Moore, Robert E. Howard and H. P. Lovecraft) to the round-robin story "The Challenge from Beyond" (1935).

Like The Man from Genoa and Other Poems, his second book is a volume of fantastic verse: The Goblin Tower (1935), published jointly by H. P. Lovecraft and Robert H. Barlow under Barlow's The Dragonfly Press imprint. (A variant edition of this volume was published in 1945 by New Collectors Group – see Bibliography.) Published in an edition of only 100 copies, this volume is exceedingly scarce; two copies are held at the collections of the John Hay Library.

=== 1940s ===
In pulps such as Thrilling Wonder Stories and Startling Stories during the 1940s, Long sometimes wrote using the pseudonym "Leslie Northern". What Long characterized as a "minor disability" kept him out of World War II and writing full-time during the early 1940s.

Long reportedly ghost-wrote two, possibly three, of the Ellery Queen Jr novels (mentioned in correspondence with August Derleth) but did not identify the titles. It is believed that the two are The Black Dog Mystery (1941) and The Golden Eagle Mystery (1942). The third may have been The Mystery of the Golden Butterfly, which was never published. (This volume is mentioned as Long's on the rear panel of The Horror from the Hills and on the rear flap of The Rim of the Unknown).

He wrote comic books in the 1940s, including horror stories for Adventures Into the Unknown (ACG) commencing with its first issue in Fall 1948. Long contributed several original scripts to this comic's early issues, as well as an adaptation of Walpole's The Castle of Otranto. He authored scripts for Planet Comics, Superman (in 1929), Congo Bill, DC's Golden Age Green Lantern, and the Fawcett Comics Captain Marvel. He worked in the 1940s as a script-reader for Twentieth Century Fox Long wrote crime and weird menace stories for Ten Gang Mystery and other magazines.

During the 1940s, Long lived for a period in California.

Long credited Theodore Sturgeon, whom he met several times in the mid-1940s, as being instrumental in getting one of his middle-period stories, "A Guest in the House", produced on CBS-TV in 1954.

In 1946, Arkham House published Long's first collection of supernatural fiction, The Hounds of Tindalos, which collected 21 of his best tales from the previous twenty years of magazine publication. It featured works which had appeared in such pulps as Weird Tales, Astounding Stories, Super Science Stories, Unknown, Thrilling Wonder Stories, Dynamic Science Fiction, Startling Stories, and others. In "The Man from Time", a time-traveller from the future has an encounter with writer F. Scott Fitzgerald.

His later science fiction works include the story collection John Carstairs, Space Detective (1949) about a 'botanical detective', and the novels Space Station 1 (1957), Mars is My Destination (1962) and It Was the Day of the Robot (1963).

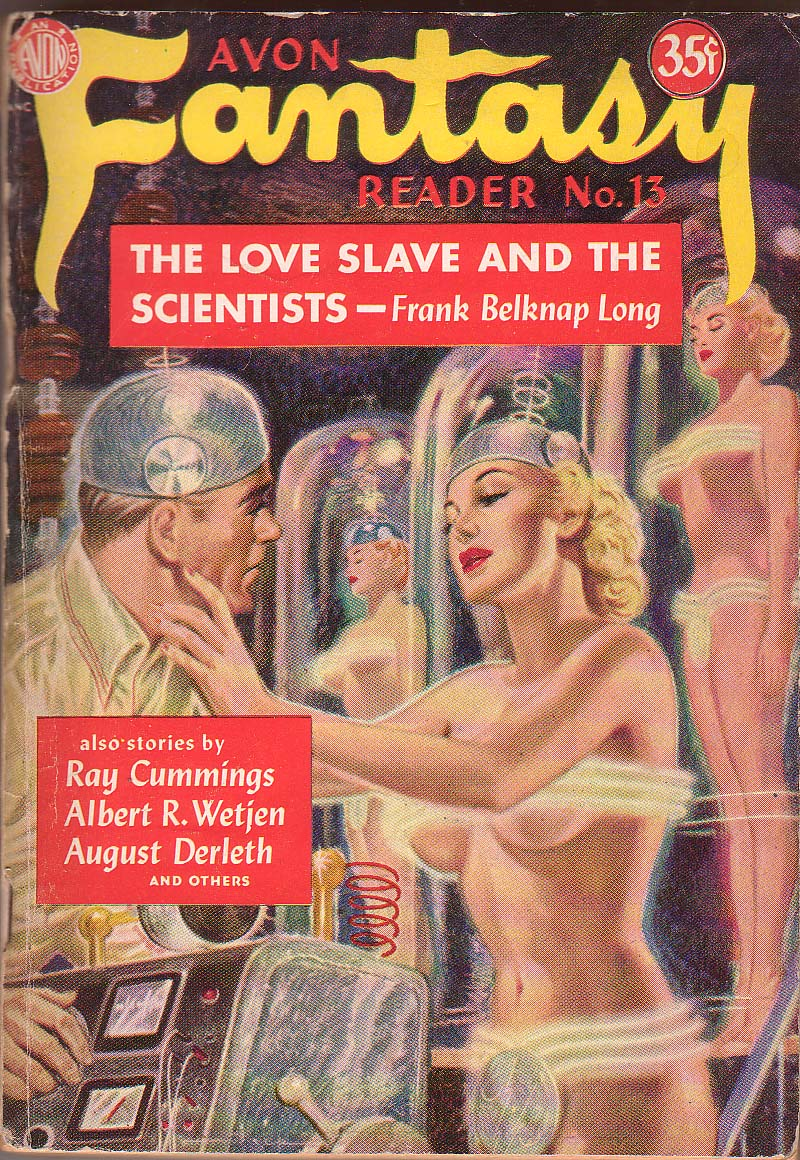
Long's 1935 Weird Tales story "The Body-Masters" was reprinted in 1950 as "The Love-Slave and the Scientists".

=== 1950s ===
In the 1950s he was involved with editing five different magazines. He was uncredited associate editor on The Saint Mystery Magazine and Fantastic Universe. He was associate editor on Satellite Science Fiction, 1959; on Short Stories, 1959–60; and on Mike Shayne Mystery Magazine until 1966.

Long several times met fellow Weird Tales writer and poet Joseph Payne Brennan, and later provided the foreword for Brennan's The Chronicles of Lucius Leffing (1977).

=== 1960s ===
After the decline of the pulps, Long moved into the prolific production of science fiction and gothic romance novels during the 1960s and 1970s. He even wrote a Man from UNCLE story, "The Electronic Frankenstein Affair", which appeared under the pen name Robert Hart Davis in the Man from UNCLE Magazine.

In 1960, he married Lyda Arco, an artists' representative and aficionado of drama. She was a Russian descended from a line of actors in the Yiddish theatre who ran a salon in Chelsea, NY. They stayed together until Long's death in 1994, but had no children. Long described himself as an "agnostic." Referring to Lovecraft, Long wrote that he "always shared HPL's skepticism . . . concerning the entire range of alleged supernatural occurrences and what is commonly defined as 'the occult.'"

In 1963, Arkham House published Long's novel The Horror from the Hills, a work partly incorporating Lovecraft's account of a dream Lovecraft had experienced. This work introduced Long's alien entity Chaugnar Faugn into the Cthulhu Mythos cycle.

=== 1970s ===
In 1972, Arkham House published The Rim of the Unknown, their second hardcover collection of Long's work - a volume focusing primarily on his science fiction short stories.

Long wrote nine modern Gothic novels, starting with So Dark a Heritage in 1966 which was published under his own name. The other eight were published as "Lyda Belknap Long", a combination of his wife's first name and his middle and surname. Seven of the nine were released in the 1970s.

Illumination on Long's own life and work is provided by his extensive introduction to The Early Long (1975), a collection of his early stories. Further writing on his own life is found in his Autobiographical Memoir (Necronomicon Press, 1986).

Long's book-length memoir of H. P. Lovecraft, Howard Phillips Lovecraft: Dreamer on the Nightside, was issued by Arkham House in 1975. It was written in haste as a result of Long's reading of L. Sprague de Camp's Lovecraft: A Biography (1975), which Long felt to be biased against Lovecraft.

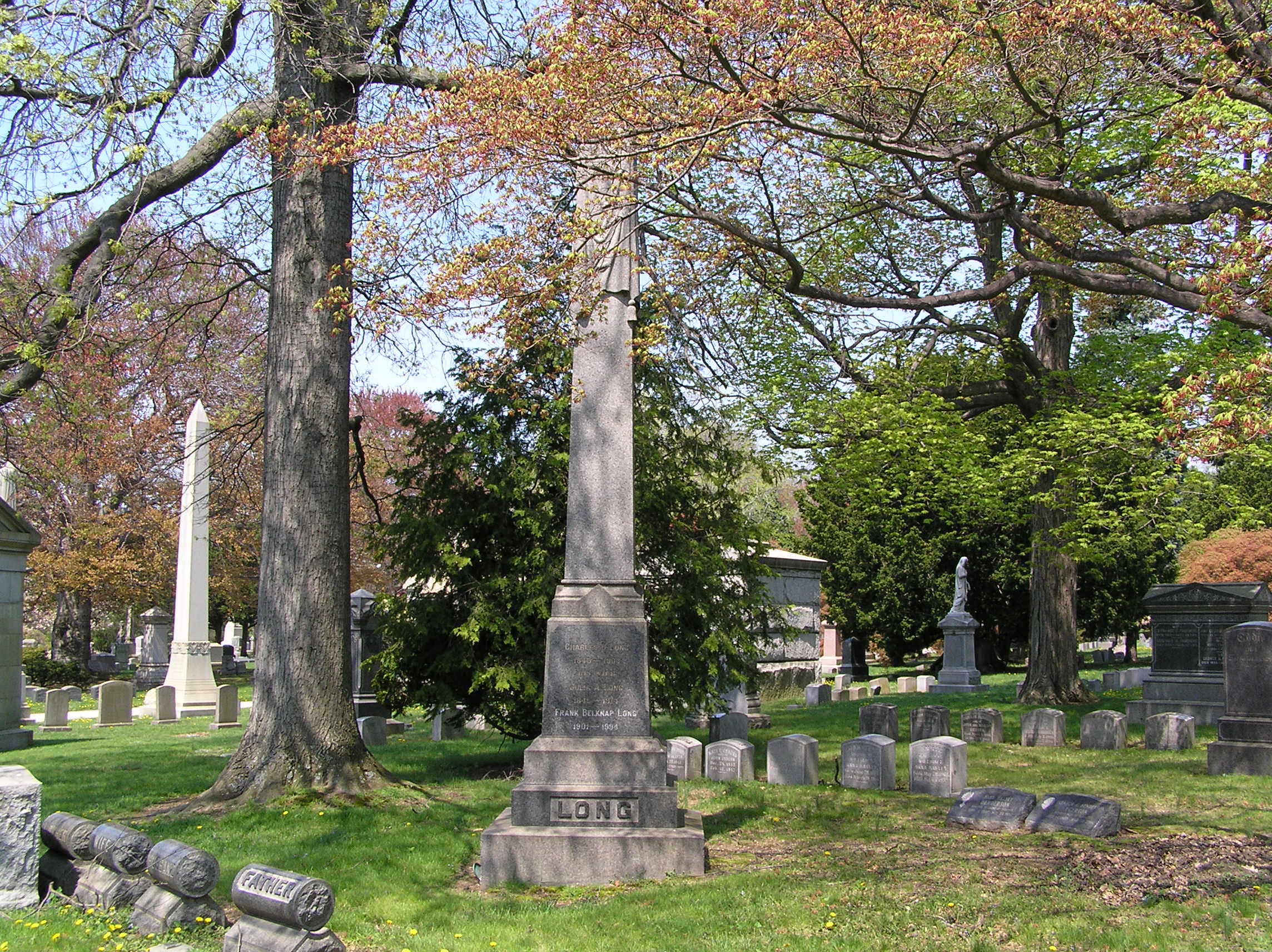
The grave of Frank Belknap Long in Woodlawn Cemetery.

In 1977, Arkham House issued Long's hardcover poetry collection In Mayan Splendor, reprinting all the poems from A Man from Genoa and Other Poems (1926) and The Goblin Tower (1935), and adding a few others. He was recognized for his work in science-fiction with the First Fandom Hall of Fame Award in 1977.

In 1978, he won the World Fantasy Award for Life Achievement at the 4th World Fantasy Convention.

=== Later career: 1980s–1990s ===
Long's literary output slowed down after 1977, with his gothic The Lemoyne Heritage. He published several scattered stories in the 1980s including the story chapbook "Rehearsal Night" (Pub: Thomas L. Owen,1981) and one episode in the round-robin sequence Ghor Kin-Slayer (Necronomicon Press, 1997).

He and his wife lived in extreme poverty during the 1980s and 1990s in an apartment in Chelsea, Manhattan - a period documented in Peter Cannon's memoir Long Memories (1997) (expanded edition as Long memories and Other Writings.

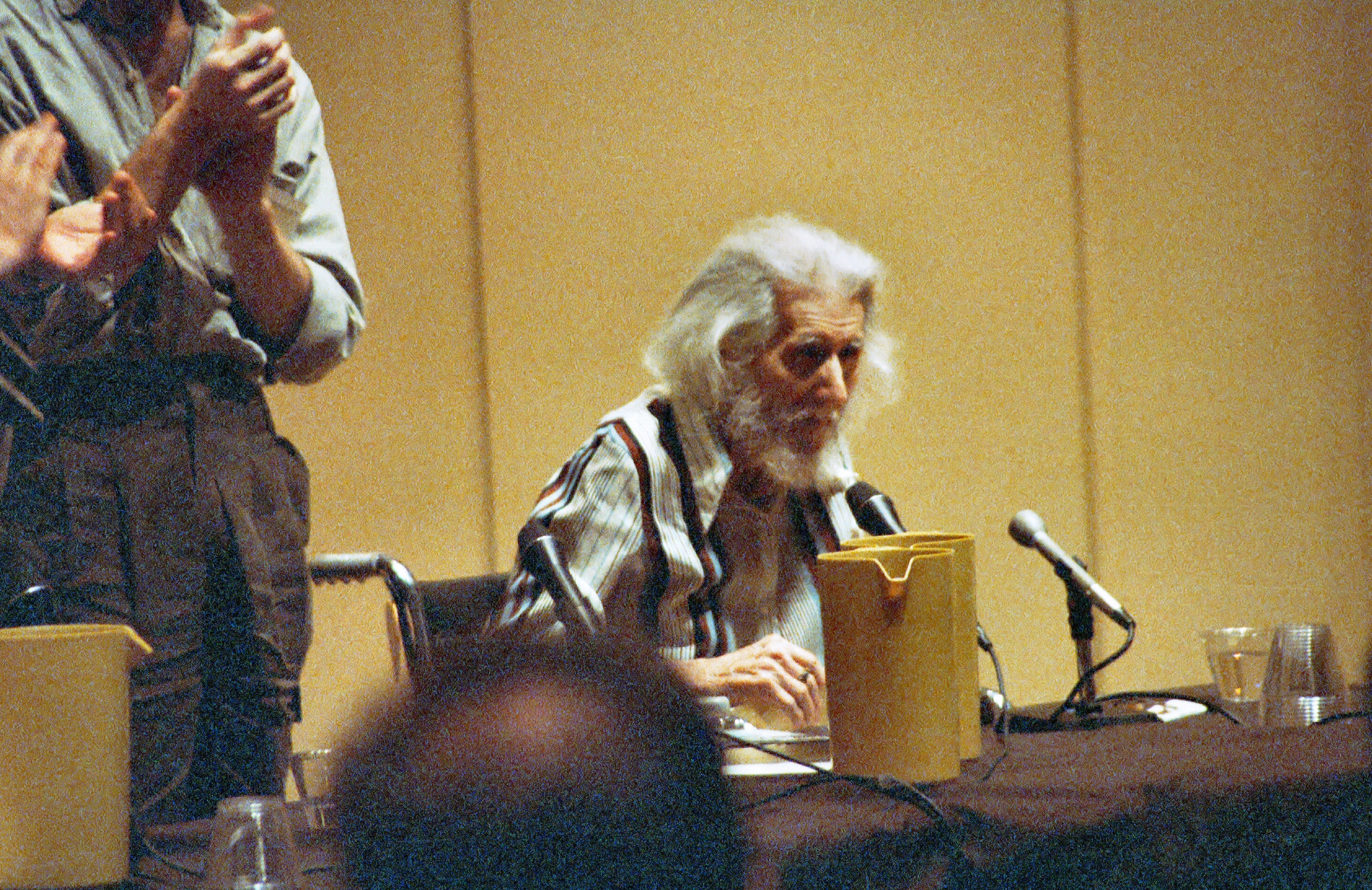
Frank Belknap Long speaking at the H. P. Lovecraft Centennial Conference

In 1986, the long-running Crypt of Cthulhu magazine devoted a special issue to Long and his work (Vol 5, No 8, Michaelmas 1986). The cover art for the issue by Allen Koszowski depicted Long's Cthulhu Mythos creation Chaugnar Faughn. The issue reprinted five rare pulp stories by Long not collected in any of his other short story collections, together with three early long poems. Rounding out the issue are essays on Long's life and work by H.P. Lovecraft, Ben P. Indick, and Peter H. Cannon.

In 1987, Long was awarded the Bram Stoker Award for Lifetime Achievement (from the Horror Writers Association).

In 1990, Long was interviewed by Leigh Blackmore at his home in New York. In August, Long was a Guest of Honor at the H. P. Lovecraft Centennial Conference in Providence, Rhode Island, in 1990, where he spoke on panels regarding his memories of his great friend and literary mentor.

Long died of pneumonia on January 3, 1994, at the age of 92 at Saint Vincent's Catholic Medical Center in Manhattan, after a seven-decade career as a writer and editor. He was briefly survived by his wife, Lyda. Lyda died shortly after Frank her ashes were scattered on his grave.

Due to his poverty, he was interred in a potter's field. Friends and colleagues had his remains reinterred at New York City's Woodlawn Cemetery, in a family plot near that of Lovecraft's grandparents. A graveside ceremony on November 3, 1995, was attended by such figures as Scott D. Briggs, Peter H. Cannon, Stefan Dziemianowicz, Ben P. Indick, S. T. Joshi, T.E.D. Klein and others and with a homily delivered by the Rev. Robert M. Price. On November 17, 1995, the actual interment of Long's body took place, an event witnessed by Peter Cannon, Ben P. Indick and S. T. Joshi. Long's fans contributed over $3,000 to have his name engraved upon the central shaft of his burial plot.

In 2015, Wildside Press acquired the rights to Long's copyrights from Long's cousins. Since that time, all Wildside Press reprints of Long's work carry the acknowledgment "Reprinted with the kind permission and assistance of Lily Doty, Mansfield M. Doty, and the family of Frank Belknap Long."

== Legacy ==
Frank Belknap Long left behind a body of work that included twenty-nine novels, 150 short stories, eight collections of short stories, three poetry collections, and numerous freelance magazine articles and comic book scripts. Author Ray Bradbury summed up Long's career: "Frank Belknap Long has lived through a major part of science fiction history in the U.S., has known most of the writers personally, or has corresponded with them, and has, with his own writing, helped shape the field when most of us were still in our early teens."

== Friendship with Lovecraft ==
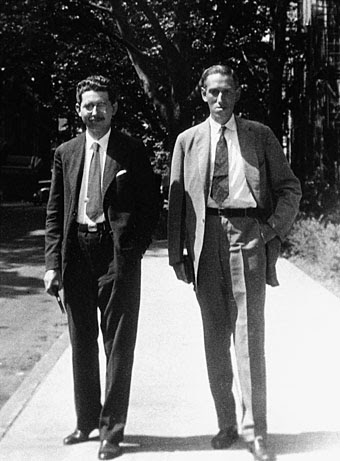
Long and Lovecraft in Brooklyn

H. P. Lovecraft was a close friend and mentor to Frank Belknap Long, with whom he came in contact in 1920 when Long was nineteen. Lovecraft found Long a stimulating correspondent especially in regard to his aesthetic tastes, focussing on the Italian Renaissance and French literature. Lovecraft published some of Long's early work in his Conservative (e.g. Felis: A prose Poem [July 1923], about Long's pet cat) and paid tribute to Long in a flattering article, "The Work of Frank Belknap Long, Jun.," published anonymously in the United Amateur (May 1924) but clearly by Lovecraft. They first met when Lovecraft visited New York in April 1922. They saw each other with great frequency (especially during Lovecraft's Brooklyn residence in New York City from 1924 to 1926), at which time they were the chief members of the Kalem Club and wrote to each other often. Long's family apartment was always Lovecraft's residence and headquarters during his periodic trips from Providence to New York.

Long writes that he and Lovecraft exchanged "more than a thousand letters, not a few running to more than eighty handwritten pages" before Lovecraft's death in 1937. Some of their correspondence was reprinted in Arkham House's Selected Letters series, collecting the voluminous correspondence of Lovecraft and his friends. Lovecraft's letters to Long after 1931 have all been lost, with the letters up to that date existing primarily in transcriptions prepared by Arkham House. Their complete extant correspondence is published as A Sense of Proportion: The Letters of H.P. Lovecraft and Frank Belknap Long (NY: Hippocampus Press, 2026, 2 vols).

Long was also part of the loosely associated "Lovecraft Circle" of fantasy writers (along with Robert Bloch, August Derleth, Robert E. Howard, Henry Kuttner, Clark Ashton Smith, C. M. Eddy Jr., and Donald Wandrei) who corresponded regularly with each other and influenced and critiqued each other's works.

Long wrote a brief preface to the stillborn edition of Lovecraft's The Shunned House (1928). Lovecraft, in turn, ghostwrote for Long the preface to Long's aunt Mrs William B. Symmes' Old World Footprints (W. Paul Cook/The Recluse Press, 1928), a slim poetry collection. Long also teamed with Lovecraft in a revision service in 1928.

Long's short novel The Horror from the Hills (Weird Tales, Jan and Feb-March 1931; published in book from 1963) incorporates verbatim a letter by Lovecraft recounting his great 'Roman dream' of Hallow'een 1927. Long's parents frequently took Lovecraft on various motor trips between 1929 and 1930, and Lovecraft visited Long at Christmas between 1932 and 1935 inclusive. Lovecraft helped Robert H. Barloew of the Dragon-Fly Press set type for Long's second poetry collection, The Goblin Tower (1935), correcting some of Long's faulty metre in the process.

Long wrote a number of early Cthulhu Mythos stories. These included "The Hounds of Tindalos" (the first Mythos story written by anyone other than Lovecraft), The Horror from the Hills (which introduced the elephantine Great Old One Chaugnar Faugn to the Mythos), and "The Space-Eaters" (featuring a fictionalized HPL as its main character). A number of other works by Long can be considered as falling within the Cthulhu Mythos; these include "The Brain Eaters" and "The Malignant Invader", as well as such poems as "The Abominable Snowman" and "When Chaugnar Wakes". A later Mythos story, "Dark Awakening", appeared in New Tales of the Cthulhu Mythos. The story betrays the influence of Long's pseudonymous romantic fiction, and the final paragraph was added by the editor at Long's suggestion.

The "Hounds of Tindalos" is Long's most famous fictional creation. The Hounds were a pack of foul and incomprehensibly alien beasts "emerging from strange angles in dim recesses of non-Euclidean space before the dawn of time" (Long) to pursue travelers down the corridors of time. They could only enter our reality via angles, where they would mangle and exsanguinate their victims, leaving behind only a "peculiar bluish pus or ichor" (Long).

Long's memoir Howard Phillips Lovecraft: Dreamer on the Night Side (Arkham House) was extensively edited by James Turner.

The Long/Lovecraft friendship was fictionalized in Peter Cannon's 1985 novel Pulptime: Being a Singular Adventure of Sherlock Holmes, Lovecraft, and the Kalem Club as if Narrated by Frank Belknap Long, Jr..

Long was a Guest of Honor at the Lovecraft Centennial Conference in Providence in 1990.

== Influence on popular culture ==
The Hounds of Tindalos have been used or referenced by many later Mythos writers, including Ramsey Campbell, Lin Carter, Brian Lumley and Peter Cannon. Cannon's story "The Letters of Halpin Chalmers", a direct sequel to "The Hounds of Tindalos", in which the main characters are thinly disguised versions of Frank and Lyda Long, appears in Robert Weinberg, Stefan R. Dziemianowicz and Martin H. Greenberg, 100 Crooked Little Crime Stories (NY: Barnes and Noble, 1994). Creatures resembling the Hounds are antagonists in Shaun Hamill's A Cosmology of Monsters (NY: Pantheon, 2019).

The Hounds have also inspired a number of metal and electronic music artists. Metallica (with their song "All Nightmare Long" from their ninth studio album Death Magnetic), Epoch of Unlight, Edith Byron's Group, Beowulf, Fireaxe, and Univers Zero have all recorded tracks incorporating them.

Charles P. Mitchell has suggested that the "drone dog" in the film Phantoms, based on the novel by Dean R. Koontz, is reminiscent of a Hound of Tindalos.

Peter Cannon's novel Pulptime features Long as the narrator. Long also appears in Richard Lupoff's novel Lovecraft's Book (1985) and its full-text version Marblehead.

The Wolves, perennial antagonists of the four-season horror comic series Witch Creek Road (2017–2021) and its spin-off Witch Creek High (2023; on hiatus) by Garth Matthams and Kenan Halilović, were based on the Hounds of Tindalos from Long's short story of the same name.

== Bibliography ==
=== Poetry ===
- A Man from Genoa and Other Poems (1926) (Athol, MA: The Recluse Press (W. Paul Cook)). Preface by Samuel Loveman. 220 copies printed.
- The Goblin Tower (Cassia, FL: Dragon-Fly Press (Robert H. Barlow), 1935. 100 copies printed, many never bound; New Collectors Group, 1945. 500 paper copies). Note: Due to the somewhat misleading publisher's introduction to the New Collectors Group edition, it is often mis-catalogued as a reprint of the 1935 Dragon-Fly Press edition. In fact, the selection of poems differs; the New Collectors Group edition drops four, "When Chaugnar Wakes," "Exotic Quest," "West Indies" and "Martial: The Vacationist" and adds three, "The Prophet," "Prediction" and "Walt Whitman." The collection is not to be confused with the novel of the same title by L. Sprague de Camp.
- On Reading Arthur Machen: A Sonnet. (Penngrove, Palo Alto, CA: Dog and Duck Press, 1949). 20 copies, privately printed. Note: H. P. Lovecraft quotes Long's sonnet in full within his discussion of Arthur Machen's work in Supernatural Horror in Literature.
- The Marriage of Sir John de Mandeville John Mandeville (Roy A. Squires, 1976). 225 copies, many signed by the author.
- In Mayan Splendor (Arkham House, 1977); Long's own selection of his best verse; includes contents of A Man from Genoa and The Goblin Tower plus additional poems. Preface by Samuel Loveman reprinted from A Man from Genoa and Other Poems (1926).
- When Chaugnar Wakes Chaugnar Faugn (Fantome Press, 1978; 80 copies only). A chapbook of this single poem, originally published in Weird Tales 20, No 3 and reprinted in In Mayan Splendor.
- The Darkling Tide: Previously Uncollected Poetry (Pat Hills, CA: Tsathoggua Press, 1995; edited by Perry M. Grayson)
- When Chaugnar Wakes: The Collected Poetry and Other Works by Frank Belknap Long (Dee Why, Sydney: Tsathoggua Press, 2024; edited by Perry M. Grayson). The most complete collection of Long's poetic work ever issued. Includes additionally several scarce stories by Long, and poetic and critical work on Long by H.P. Lovecraft and Donald Sidney-Fryer and an assortment of reprinted early reviews of Long's verse collections.

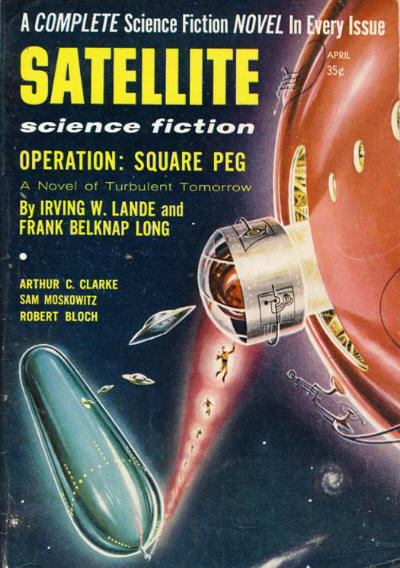
"Operation: Square Peg", a collaboration between Long and advertising executive Irving W. Lande, was the cover story for the April 1957 issue of Satellite Science Fiction

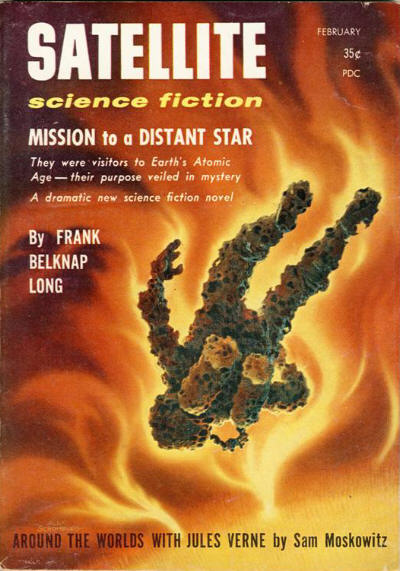
Long's "Mission to a Distant Star" was the cover story for the February 1958 issue of Satellite Science Fiction. It appeared in book form in 1964 as Mission to a Star.

=== Novels & Short Stories ===
- The hounds of Tindalos (Indianapolis, IN: Popular Fiction Publishing Company, 1929)
- The red fetish (Indianapolis, IN: Popular Fiction Publishing Company, 1929)
- The Vibration Wasps (from Comet January 41)
- The Mercurian (from Planet Stories Winter 1941)
- The Sky Trap (from Comet July 1941)
- Atomic Station (United States: Standard Magazines, Inc., 1945)
- Time trap (from Planet Stories Winter 1948)
- Galactic heritage (United States: Standard Magazines, Inc., 1948)
- And we sailed the mighty dark (United States: Better Publications, Inc., 1948)
- Fuzzy head (United States: Standard Magazines, Inc., 1948)
- The miniature menace (United States: Columbia Publications, Inc., 1950)
- The Mississippi Saucer (from Weird Tales, March 1951)
- Lake of Fire (from Planet Stories May 1951)
- The Timeless Ones (from Planet Stories July 1951)
- Little men of space (New York, NY: King-Size Publications, Inc., 1953)
- The Man the Martians Made (from Fantastic Universe January 1954)
- The Man from Time (from Fantastic Universe March 1954)
- The Calm Man (from Fantastic Universe May 1954)
- Mr. Caxton Draws a Martian Bird (from Fantastic Universe July 1954)
- The cottage (New York, NY: King-Size Publications, Inc., 1954)
- Space Station 1 (Ace Books D242, 1957 - an Ace double, bound with Empire of the Atom by A.E. van Vogt).
- Mission to a Distant Star (Satellite SF magazine serial in 5 parts)
- Woman from Another Planet (Chariot Books,1960)
- The Horror Expert (Belmont Books, Dec 1961)
- Mating Center (Chariot Books, 1961)
- Mars is My Destination (Pyramid Books, June 1962)
- The Horror from the Hills (Arkham House,1963); expanded edition as Odd Science Fiction (1964)
- Three Steps Spaceward (Avalon Books, 1963)
- It Was the Day of the Robot (Belmont Books, 1963). Reprint: Dennis Dobson, 1964.
- The Martian Visitors (Avalon Books, 1964)
- Mission to a Star (Avalon Books, 1964)
- Lest Earth Be Conquered (Belmont Books, Dec 1966); reissue as The Androids, (Tower Books, 1969)
- This Strange Tomorrow (Belmont Books, Feb 1966)
- So Dark a Heritage (Lancer Books,1966)
- Journey Into Darkness (Belmont Books, April 1967)
- ...And Others Shall Be Born (Belmont Books, Jan 1968) (bound with The Thief of Thoth by Lin Carter)
- The Three Faces of Time (Tower Books, 1969)
- To the Dark Tower (Lancer Books, 1969) (as by Lyda Belknap Long)
- Monster From Out of Time (Popular Library, 1970 pbk original). Reprinted in hc, London: Robert Hale, 1971.
- Survival World (Lancer Prestige/Magnum, 1971)
- The Witch Tree (Lancer Books, 1971) (as by Lyda Belknap Long)
- Fire of the Witches (Popular Library, 1971) (as by Lyda Belknap Long)
- The Shape of Fear (Beagle Books, July 1971) (as by Lyda/Lydia Belknap Long; the author's pseudonym 'Lyda Belknap long' was misprinted on the cover as 'Lydia Belknap Long').
- The Night of the Wolf (Popular Library, 1972)
- House of the Deadly Nightshade (Beagle Books, March 1972) (as by Lyda Belknap Long)
- Legacy of Evil (Beagle Books, June 1973) (as by Lyda Belknap Long)
- Crucible of Evil (Avon, July 1974)(as by Lyda Belknap Long)
- The Lemoyne Heritage (Zebra Books, 1977)(as by Lyda Belknap Long)
- Rehearsal Night (Pub: Thomas L. Owen,1981)
- Ghor Kin-Slayer (Long has one episode in this round-robin sequence; Necronomicon Press, 1997)

=== Story collections ===
- The Hounds of Tindalos (Arkham House, 1946). Reprints: London: Museum Press, 1950. NY: Belmont books, Aug 1963.
- John Carstairs: Space Detective (Frederick Fell, 1949). Reprints: Toronto: McLeod, 1949 (?); Kemsley, 1951.
- Odd Science Fiction (Aug 1964). Reprint, London: Brown Watson, 1965 (as The Horror from the Hills). Contains "The Horror from the Hills", plus "The Flame of Life" and "Giant in the Forest".
- The Dark Beasts and Eight Other Stories from the Hounds of Tindalos (1964). Contains half the contents of the 1946 The Hounds of Tindalos collection.
- The Rim of the Unknown (Arkham House, 1972). Reprint (pbk) Condor Books, 1978.
- The Black Druid and Other Stories. (London: Panther, 1975)
- A Dangerous Experiment (Necronomicon Press, 1977; single story in chapbook form). This tale is also reprinted in The Eye Above the Mantel and Other Stories.
- The Early Long (NY: Doubleday, 1975) (London: Robert Hale, 1977). (NY: Jove/HBJ, 1979 as The Hounds of Tindalos).
- Night Fear (Zebra Books, 1979). Intro by Roy Torgeson. 16 tales from the pulps including "The Horror from the Hills".
- Escape from Tomorrow: Three Previously Unreprinted Weird Tales (Necronomicon Press, 1995)
- The Eye Above the Mantel and Other Stories: 4 Previously Uncollected Weird Tales. Foreword by H. P. Lovecraft. Edited by Perry M. Grayson. West Hills, CA: Tsathoggua Press, Aug 1995. The Foreword is Lovecraft's essay "The Work of Frank Belknap Long, Jr", reprinted from The United Amateur (May 1924).
- The Man Who Died Twice & Three Others (Wildside Press, 2009)

=== Plays ===
A Guest in the House (CBS-TV television play, 1954)

=== Recordings ===
Audio recording of author panel discussion from First World Fantasy Convention, Providence, 1975. Long's voice was preserved on a flexi-disc record of this speech issued with the fanzine Myrrdin Issue 3 (1976). The other side of the flexi-disc contains a recording of Robert Bloch's speech from the convention.

=== Memoirs of H. P. Lovecraft ===
- "Random Memories of H. P. Lovecraft" (Marginalia)
- "H.P.L. in Red Hook" (in The Occult Lovecraft, ed. Anthony Raven, 1975)
- Howard Phillips Lovecraft: Dreamer on the Night Side (Arkham House, 1975). Italian translation published by Profondo Rosso, Rome, 2010 as H. P. Lovecraft e le ombre
- "H. P. Lovecraft". Poem. Weird Tales (June 1938); reprinted in In Mayan Splendor (p. 66)

=== Other essays ===
- "At the Home of Poe". Reprint in Lon Milo duQuette, ed, The Weiser Book of Horror and the Occult: Hidden Magic, Occult Truths, and the scary Stories That Started It All, Red Wheel/Weiser, 2014.

=== Introductions to books by others ===
- Joseph Payne Brennan. The Chronicles of Lucius Leffing. Donald M. Grant, Publisher, 1977.
- Richard Lupoff. The Return of Skull-Face. Fax Collectors Editions, 1977.
- H. P. Lovecraft The Colour Out of Space (Jove, 1978). Long's brief preface was inadvertently omitted from the first printing of this collection.
- H. P. Lovecraft. The Conservative Complete 1915-1923. West Warwick, RI: Necronomicon Press, 1976 (50 copies only); 1977 (2000 copies). Edited by Marc A. Michaud.

== Awards ==
- First Fandom Hall of Fame award (1977).
- World Fantasy Award for Life Achievement (at the 1978 4th World Fantasy Convention),
- Bram Stoker Award for Lifetime Achievement (in 1987, from the Horror Writers Association).

Long's poem "The Marriage of Sir John de Mandeville" was a retrospective Nominee for Best Long Poem in the 1977 Rhysling Awards

== Media adaptations ==
- Long's short story "The Space Eaters" was adapted as episode 63 of the television series Monsters, starring Richard Clarke, Mart Hulswit and Richard M. Hughes.
