= List of Great Old Ones =

This is a compendium of the known “Great Old Ones” of the Cthulhu Mythos of H. P. Lovecraft, his friends and successors, and many later writers and creators. For an explanation of the classification term Great Old Ones, please refer to the linked page.

== Overview ==
This article is a list of the currently known names, aliases, and brief descriptions of the Great Old Ones. Some of the famous or notable Great Old Ones are explained under separate subheadings.

In Chaosium’s role-playing game Call of Cthulhu and other works, deities classified as “Outer Gods” are listed on the linked page, provided there are no discrepancies in their classification across editions.

Great Old Ones
Name	Epithet(s), other name(s)	Description
Abholos	Devourer in the Mist	A grey festering blob of infinite malevolence, described as the lesser brother of Tsathoggua or spawn of Cthulhu, born from his bile and tears.
Abhoth	The Source of Uncleanliness	An entity that is a horrid, dark gray, protean mass said to be the ultimate source of all miscreation and abomination. Obscene monsters are constantly spawned from this mass, and many of them are devoured once again by Abhoth. It is often referred to as the Outer God.
Affair that shambleth about in the night	Affair that shambleth in the stars	A shape of darkness entity, and transcending our world, but lesser than 'Umr at-Tawil.
Alala	Herald of S'glhuo	An entity of living sound native to the Gulf of S'glhuo, and manifesting as a huge monstrous being. He is served by the Denizens of S'glhuo, which are made of his same substance.
Alila	Queen of perdition and goddess of all iniquities	She is worshipped with obscene rites by some in Tasuun, located within Zothique.
Ammutseba	Devourer of Stars	A dark, cloudy mass with tentacles, absorbing falling stars. She has also been represented as a woman-shaped black hole. One day, she will return to devour the stars and all light.
Amon-Gorloth	Creator of the Nile and Universe's Equilibrium	A gigantic mysterious entity whose cult is perhaps coincident with that of Egyptian God Amun. Once dwelling in a gigantic palace known as Gz-eh near the Valley of the Kings, his dreaming force was able to shape reality, causing life to eventually flourish within the Nile Valley, over 3,000 years ago, before the stars ceased to be right, and the advancing desert entombed his titanic body beneath the sands. Priests of his cult have built up secret subterranean mausoleums to access the Great Old One's body, and please the slumbering god by giving cattle as sacrificial victims.
Amun Zah	God of Healers	A young giant deity clad in golden armor.
Anothqgg	—	A lesser Great Old One with a bizarre appearance featuring serpent-like appendages, able to manipulate human souls or turn them into weapons.
Anubis	Anpu, Opener of the Way	Anubis is the Great Old One of the underworld in Egyptian mythology and appears in the Cthulhu Mythos as a servant god of Nyarlathotep. Other theories suggest a relation to Yog-Sothoth. He is a master of magic related to soul control and the protection of realms.
Apep	Apophis, Eater of Souls	A malevolent serpent deity from Egyptian mythology, the devourer of souls. The Great Old One usually dwells in the realm of the dead and is capable of creating a misty veil that blocks out light and the stars. It can also control the weather and ground at will.
Aphoom-Zhah	The Cold Flame, Lord of the Pole	Appears much like Cthugha, but grey and cold.
Apocolothoth	The Moon God	Lunar entity that dwells in the Dimension of Enno-Lunn.
Arwassa	The Silent Shouter on the Hill	It floats around the hills of the old mottes and baileys of Europe, driving the men stationed there to insanity. A humanoid-torso with tentacles instead of limbs, and a short neck ending in a toothless, featureless mouth.
Asterias	The Ravening Deep	A starfish-like deity with seven tentacles that devours all living things.
Atlach-Nacha	The Spider God, Spinner in Darkness	A giant spider with a human-like face.
Aulaniis	most wanton Death-Bringer	One of the Daemon-Sirens, daughters of Azathoth.
Aunutz	Immortal Aunutz	A most wise and cruel deity living in a palace beneath the North Pole who grants wishes.
Ayi'ig	The Serpent Goddess, Aeg, Aega	Daughter of both Yig and the Outer Goddess Yidhra, appearing as a gigantic octopus-like horror with serpentine eyes, and detachable tentacles, which may move independently. She dwells within the cavern of a deep canyon somewhere in Texas.
Aylith	The Widow in the Woods, The Many-Mother	A tall, shadowy humanoid figure with yellow glowing eyes, and strange protrusions like the branches of dead trees. She is a servant of Shub-Niggurath.
Azi Dahaka	Serpent of a Thousand Skills	A demonic entity in ancient Persian folklore.
Babylon Bob	God of secret bargains and whores in all their many flavors	A Little God of secret bargains and whores in all their many flavors. It seems to embody the concepts found in cities. It takes people's culture and innovation as a form of faith and manifests itself accordingly.
Balgharta	He With Hands and Face of Flame	He With Hands and Face of Flame, a dread entity of unknown origin.
Baoht Z'uqqa-Mogg	The Bringer of Pestilence, Mot	A huge, flying scorpion with an ant-like head. It also lived on Shaggai, a planet that was destroyed by the Outer God Ghroth.
Basatan	Master of the Crabs	A sea-god in Zothique. This deity possesses a ring with supernatural powers and may be associated with the constellation Cancer. Not described, possibly has fins and tentacles.
B'gnu-Thun and Ruhtra-Dyoll	The Soul-Chilling Ice-God	Appears as a cyanotic humanoid, followed by an eerie blizzard.
Black Naga	—	A monster that has existed on Bali since ancient times, awakening once every thousand years to devour people.
Black Sun	—	A mysterious god that draws energy and information directly from another dimension.
Bog Buggeroth	Cthulhahoop	The deity who is the ancestor of many of the Great Old Ones.
Bokrug	The Great Water Lizard, The Doom of Sarnath	Appears as a gigantic water lizard. In some novels, Bolrug is regarded as a Lesser Old One (serves Mnomquah).
Brl'trun	Yellow worm of Belane	Belane's worm that melted the Cross.
Bugg-Shash	The Black One, The Filler of Space, He Who Comes in the Dark	Appears as a black slimy mass covered in eyes and mouths, much like a Shoggoth.
Bug'zha Bhun-Yeh	Rabbit hybrid monster-god	The deity who used telekinesis to devour all life on Mars in ancient times.
Byagoona	The Faceless Ones	Revered as a god of the dead and reanimated the deceased to sustain itself on their life force. Theorized to be an avatar of Nyarlathotep, though this is not confirmed.
Byatis	The Berkeley Toad, Serpent-Bearded Byatis	Appears as a gigantic multicolored toad with one eye, a proboscis, crab-like claws, and tentacles below the mouth. It is known as one of the Gods of Divination and is associated with Yig and Han. Byatis is somewhat weaker than the other Great Old Ones and is sometimes trapped somewhere on Earth, but it can devour people and grow to enormous sizes.
Catena	—	A god worshipped by the indigenous peoples of the Amazon who compels his followers to eat parasites.
Catherinulhu	—	Cthulhu's half-sister.
Ceto	Keto, Sea Monster and Mother of the Graeae	A sea goddess and monster from Greek mythology. Ceto is treated as the lesser deity or Unique Entity.
Chaugnar Faugn	The Horror from the Hills, The Feeder, Caug-Narfagn	A vampiric elephant-like humanoid, with a mouth on the end of its trunk.
Chig	—	An entity first made mention of in The Revelations of Glaaki.
Chor-Tal	The God of Hellish Laughter	A god resembling a giant, monstrous bird.
Chronophagos	Eater of Hours, Devourer of Time	An entity that turns humans into stone, devours time and memories, and recreates them within its own dreams.
Coatlicue	Serpent Skirted One	Appears as a gigantic reptilian humanoid with two facing snakes in place of an actual head, as depicted in the Coatlicue statue. She was the former mate of Yig, revered in K'n-yan along with her consort.
Coinchenn	—	A marine tentacled horror made of fish, whale, and octopus-like features.
Crom Cruach	Master of the Runes, Bloody Crooked One	Not described, but likely something gigantic and serpent or worm-like.
Crothoaka	—	A deity of the labyrinth, who resembles a long, worm-like caterpillar.
Crumble Down	God of urban decay	A Little God of urban decay. It seems to embody the concepts found in cities. It takes people's culture and innovation as a form of faith and manifests itself accordingly.
Cthaat	The Dark Water God	A formless mass of shape-shifting water.
Cthaeghya	—	(Half-)sister of Cthulhu. Cthulhu was reunited with Cthaeghya, while weakened by the division. Taking pity on him, Cthaeghya gave the greater portion of her power to Cthulhu, and she spawned the Star-Spawn of Cthulhu.
Cthalhia	—	Cthulhu's consort, who manifests by possessing a human sacrifice, eventually breaks free and becomes gigantic.
Cthugha	The Living Flame, The Burning One	Appears as a living conflagration.
Cthulhu	Master of R'lyeh, The Great Dreamer, Cthulhutl, Tulu, Kthulhu, Clooloo, Clulu	A massive hybrid of human, octopus, and dragon. He is usually depicted as being hundreds of meters tall, with webbed arms, tentacles, and a pair of rudimentary wings on his back.
Cthylla	Secret Daughter of Cthulhu	Appears as a huge winged octopus-like creature with six eyes. Youngest of Cthulhu and Idh-yaa's progeny.
Ctoggha	The Dream-Daemon	No description available.
Curmonga	—	A god with a reptilian body and ape-like arms who devoured humans and turned them into slaves.
Cyäegha	The Destroying Eye, The Waiting Dark	Appears as a gigantic black mass of tentacles, with a single green eye at the center. Nearly identical to Hermaeus Mora in the Elder Scrolls franchise.
Cymaeghi	Eye of Intoxicating Tears, The Weeper	The young god, who is the child of Cyäegha, is shedding tears.
Cynothoglys	The Mortician God, She Whose Hand Embalms, Cythulos	Appears as a formless mound, with one arm-like appendage.
Daffei-D'ukkh	—	A god who has been worshipped since ancient times.
Daoth-Yhol	—	Cthulhu’s arch-enemy, who has dwelled on Earth since time immemorial, freezes the souls and spirits.
Dezmaethragel	Feaster at the End of Time	He was a sorcerer and found a way to control time. However, he ended up trapping himself at the end of time. He manipulates time, devours beings, and erases them.
Dho-Spawn	Larvae of the Great Old One(classification), Z'ekk-Ulla	The Larva of the Invisible Great Old One.
Dhumin	The Burrower from the Bluff	A serpentine (likely Tremors-like) earth-shaking horror dwelling in the subsoil of Memphis, US.
D'numl		Cthulhu's female cousin.
Domaag T'eel	—	A made god created by the Mi-go and sealed within Earth's moon, capable of altering the moon's orbit.
Drac-hazl	—	The Lord of the ghouls, who extends tentacles from the void to prey on humans. However, it is not explicitly stated whether this name refers to this god or to someone else.
Draculhu	Manta-winged ray-demon	An Old One born as a byproduct of a nightmare Cthulhu had. It existed within Earth’s Dreamlands even before the emergence of humankind. It has a headless appearance, with a silhouette that resembles a manta ray yet evokes a bat as well. It draws its power from moonlight.
Dreaming King	new Great Old One	A room of flesh that writes the story of life and creates a human being who matches that story.
Dweller in the Gulf	Eidolon of the Blind	An entity living underground on Mars that resembles a turtle.
Dygra	The Stone-Thing	A jewel-facetted, semi-crystalline geode with mineral tentacles.
Dythalla	Lord of Lizards	A gigantic saurian creature similar to Bokrug, but terrestrial, and endowed with a mane of tentacles.
Dzéwà	The White God	A ravenous plant-god who arrived from Xiclotl to Earth, awed by the Insects from Shaggai. He appears as a white orb hiding an enormous magenta excrescence, like an orchid or a lamprey-like mouth, with emerald tentacles, tipped with hands emerging from within the hideous mass.
Eihort	The Pale Beast, God of the Labyrinth	Appears as a huge, pallid, gelatinous oval with myriad legs and multiple eyes.
Ei'lor	The Star-Seed, The Plant-God	A plant-like parasitic horror native to the jungle planet Kr’llyand, which orbits a dead, green star.
Ekwensu	God of change and bargaining, God in the creek	A god who manipulates humans with its singing voice and drives them to commit mass murder. It pierces humans with tusks curved like ivory, transforming them into immortal servants. Born alongside Gla'aki, it was sealed beneath Dunbar Creek.
Erlik	The Dark Star	The god of death and the underworld as depicted in Central Asian folklore and mythology.
Ezel-zen-rezl	—	A colony of creatures called trylogogs, which resemble scarabs and tarantulas.
Flees the Light	Rat-god of vermin and crawling things	A Little Rat God of vermin and crawling things. It seems to embody the concepts found in cities. It takes people's culture and innovation as a form of faith and manifests itself accordingly.
Gal'Thrak'Gul	Thresher of souls	A soul reaper born from Azathoth, with a gigantic eye and a mouth sprouting countless tentacles.
Gamiszarra	Living Island	A colossal Lesser Old One with a chimera-like appearance, resembling a hybrid of seven different animals.
Gandareva	Guardian of the End Times	The Master of the Abyss and Protecting Cthylla.
Garga-heth	Gorilla-God	A god with a form resembling a cross between a gorilla and an orangutan, with horns like those of a sheep.
Ger'igguthy	The Parasite God	The god of parasites and a being that feasts on carrion.
Ghadamon	Larvae of the Great Old One(classification), A Seed of Azathoth	A bluish-brown, slimy monstrosity riddled with holes, and an occasional malformed head.
Ghatanothoa	Lord of the Volcano, Thoa	Appears as a colossal horror with multifarious appendages, and Gorgon-like powers.
Ghattambah	The Insect-God, The Hungry One	A deity served Nyarlathotep in the Outer God's plots to lay waste to the human race.
Ghisguth	The Sound of Deep Waters	A titanic mass of jelly-like material.
Ghor-Gothra	Great Mother Insect	The god who is the mother of the insects that open the seams of the world, serving as a passageway for the Great Old Ones.
Gi-Hoveg	The Aether Anemone	A cosmic-entity manifesting as a gigantic, spongy, and fleshy mass covered in a myriad of both eyes and spines. He is said to be the nemesis of the Outer God Uvhash, usually summoned to contrast this deity. He is usually referred to as the Outer God.
Gla'aki	The Inhabitant of the Lake, Lord of Dead Dreams	Appears as a giant three-eyed slug with metallic spines, and tiny pyramid-like feet underneath.
Gleeth	The Blind God of the Moon	An eyeless and deaf Lunar deity worshiped in the ancient continent of Theem'dra, as well as in the Dreamlands, often mentioned as similar to Mnomquah, but various theories regarding the relationship between the two are presented in different works.
Gloon	The Corrupter of Flesh, Master of the Temple, Glhuun	Usually manifests through a Dionysian sculpture, but its true form is that of a gigantic wattled slug-thing. This deity is occasionally referred to as a Lesser Other God.
Gnophkehs	The horror of the North	A gigantic monster with six or eight limbs covered in white fur, with a single horn protruding from its forehead, that slumbers in the frozen north. It is sometimes regarded as an avatar of Rhan-Tegoth or Cthulhu.
Gobogeg	The Twice-Invoked	Appears as a colossal pillar of amorphous alien flesh, with a cyclopean head. It drags up the continent it is summoned in, and causes the entire world to suddenly cave-in on itself.
God of the Red Flux	The Evil Old One	A vaporous red entity haunting the rainforest of Central Africa. It has the power to turn humans into zombie-like servants, the Tree-Men of M'bwa.
God of Soil	Ancient emperor bloodworm, Ancient and malevolent blood-worm	A giant worm as red as blood. It craves blood-stained soil. It releases spores to infest humans and controls the plants it has taken over like beasts.
Goemagot	—	Giants from folklore in Britain and Brittany.
Gog-Hoor	Eater of the Insane	A gigantic entity dwelling in some reverse dimension, resembling a huge bullet with a long proboscis.
Gol-Goroth	Golgoroth, The Forgotten Old One, God of the Black Stone, Golgoroð	Appears as a gigantic, black, toad-like creature with an impossibly malevolent glare, or a tentacled, scaled, bat-winged entity. It is a dark god of Bal-Sagoth and Hyboria. Occasionally, it is thought to have some relation to Tsathoggua.
Golothess	—	An entity cut in ten pieces by Yig during a time of great battle (one of these pieces is an alabaster dish found in Egypt, dated back 1,300 BC). It resembles and has a similar domain as the Greek god Dionysus.
Gorgotha	Mother of Cruelties	Deity Associated with The Eighth Genealogy of Lu-Kthu.
Green God	The Horror Under Warrendown	A sentient plant-like entity dwelling within a series of caverns, where it is always served by mutant rabbit-like worshipers.
Gromac	the Shatterer	An entity from another dimension that takes the form of a dragon.
Groth-Golka	The Demon Bird-God, The Bird-God of Balsagoð	A monstrous bird-like fiend with sharp teeth, dwelling beneath Antarctica, vaguely resembling an extinct pterosaur. It was identified as the last member of a species of prehistoric bird that has lived for centuries and is worshiped as a god by the people of Bal-Sagoth. One theory suggests that Groth-Golka and Mnomquah are brothers.
Gtuhanai	The Destroyer God of the Aartnna	A destructive entity manifesting as a ravenous metallic vortex. He seems to be another half-brother of Cthulhu, like Hastur, and related to the slug-like Glaaki as well. He has also been called a "son of Yog-Sothoth". Whether these titles are literal or conceal some dark truth about the Destroyer, none can ascertain. He dwells somewhere in the Pleiades stellar region, and when summoned, he brings devastation.
Gurathnaka	Eater of Dreams, Shadow of the Night	A shadowy incorporeal entity dwelling in the Dreamlands.
Gur'la-ya	Lurker in the Doom-laden Shadows	A great shadow thing, with two glaring red eyes, able to transform the skull of its victims into green glowing stones carved with strange symbols.
Gwarloth	—	A tentacled amoebic horror with multiple eyes, orifices, and a dangling gland forming a hideous face.
Gyyagin	Star-Eater, Blinder of Time	A giant worm that serves Yog-Sothoth.
Gzxtyos	Mate of Othuyeg	The consort of Othuyeg, likely similar to her bridegroom.
Han	The Dark One	A being made of cold, howling mist bound to Yig's worship. In Chaosium's role-playing games, Han is regarded as an Great Old One or lesser deity.
Hastalÿk	The Contagion	A gestalt entity composed of millions of microbial parts. It amplifies and alters existing contagions and causes cellular mutations. For example, it is considered responsible for plagues and Influenza.
Hastur	The Unspeakable, He Who is Not to be Named, Lord of Interstellar Spaces, The King in Yellow, The Peacock King, Zukala-Koth	His true form is unknown, but usually manifests either as a polypous, ravenous floating mass endowed with tentacles, drills, and suckers, or more frequently, as the King in Yellow, a humanoid being wearing tattered, yellow clothes and a mask hiding the face. He is said to be Cthulhu's (half-)brother. He is said to be of the air element opposed to Cthulhu's water element.
Hati	—	The Wolf from Norse Mythology That Devours the Moon.
H'chtelegoth	The Great Tentacled God	A towering greenish trunk with a "crown" of tentacles, a row of multiple eyes, and a series of additional lateral grasping appendages.
Hecate	Queen of Darkness	A Greek Goddess of the underworld, ghosts, and magic. Hecate is the ultimate identity of Our Ladies of Sorrow (three goddesses or powerful Unique entities: Mater Lachrymarum, Mater Suspiriorum, and Mater Tenebrarum). Additionally, she is suggested as a possible avatar of Nyarlathotep (however, this is only a supplementary suggestion). She has connections with Shub-Niggurath.
Hialdiabrun	Moon Goddess sings in the black forest	A goddess who looks like a pure-white woman and the daughter or sister of Nyarlathotep. She captivates humans like a hypnotist through her singing, leaping, and dancing.
Hnarqu	The Great One	Lesser brother of Cthulhu, manifesting as a gigantic mouth surrounded by countless tentacles, similar to a titanic sea anemone.
Hudusoymaeya		A giant goddess who lives underwater, from whose pores a toxic black liquid drips. She gives birth to plants that release deadly, poisonous pollen.
Huitloxopetl	—	The son of Azathoth, who can manipulate dreams sealed away in a galaxy at the edge of the universe. He is sometimes considered the Outer God.
Huītzilōpōchtli	Huitzilopotchli	A deity from Aztec mythology whose connection to Cthulhu has been suggested.
Hydra	Thousand-Faced Moon	A god resembling a viscous, gray sea that dwells in a realm of another dimension. When people project their astral bodies, it uses that person’s physical body to enter this dimension, decapitates the victims, imprisons them in eternal torment, and drains the energy from their brains. This deity is occasionally considered the (minor) Outer God.
Hziulquoigmnzhah	The God of Cykranosh, Ziulquag-Manzah	Has a spheroid body, elongated arms, short legs, and a pendulum-like head dangling underneath. He is the brother of Ghisguth, and uncle of Tsathoggua.
Iao Thamungazoth	—	One of the three primal lords of Lemuria and an aspect of the Triple God of Chaos.
Idh-yaa	Cthulhu's Mate, Xothic Matriarch	A gigantic, pale, worm-like horror dwelling beneath the crust of the star Xoth. She has been Cthulhu's first bride, and with him spawned three sons—Ghatanothoa, Ythogtha, and Zoth-Ommog—and a younger daughter, Cthylla.
Iku-Turso	—	The God Lurking in the Finnish Seas.
Inpesca	The Sea Horror	A formless expansive bluish-black mass, haunting both the Ecuadorian and Peruvian coasts, mentioned in Cthäat Aquadingen as inimical to the Deep Ones.
Iod	The Shining Hunter	A levitating, sinuous glowing creature.
Istasha	Mistress of Darkness	A cat-like deity, similar to Bastet, but vicious and malignant. Her sister is the sylvan Lythalia.
Ithaqua	The Wind Walker, The Wendigo, God of the Cold White Silence	A gigantic, corpse-like human, with webbed feet and glowing red eyes.
Izothaugnol	—	A monster with a massive head and seven serpentine bodies, capable of reversing time to a limited extent.
Janai'ngo	Guardian and the Key of the Watery Gates, The Lobster of the Deep	A crustacean-like, tentacled, half-amorphous marine horror which serves Cthulhu, dwelling in the depths of the Bay of Rhiiklu, somewhere within the eastern coast of the United States.
Juk-Shabb	God of Yekub	This deity appears as a great shining ball of energy. It is a powerful psionic and has extensive knowledge of magic. Among the Great Old Ones, it is one of the least malevolent.
Kaalut	The Ravenous One	Likely a gigantic larva-like horror, dwelling in the nebulous realm of K'gil'mnon, along with the Gharoides, its parasitic insectoid servants. This deity is usually referred to as Outer God.
Kag'Naru of the Air	—	Mentioned in the American comic book Challengers of the Unknown #81–87 (1977) as the sister of M'Nagalah.
Kalanpäinen	—	The deity who ruled over the area of Finland, however, Finnish sages and poets kicked it out.
Kamog	—	An entity believed to be the god of death.
Karnunna	Horned God	A minor god with fangs, claws, and tentacles. When a member of the imperial family wears an amulet and offers a prayer, they can temporarily transfer their soul into a statue of Karnunna and wield its power at will. It is said they should not rely on this power more than once.
Kassogtha	Bride of Cthulhu, The Leviathan of Diseases	A huge mass of coiled, writhing tentacles. She is Cthulhu's sister and mate, who bore him the twin daughters Nctosa and Nctolhu.
Kaunuzoth	The Great One, Cannoosut	A squat, sea cucumber-like monstrosity with five eyes, three-toed, taloned appendages, and a large mouth. He is described as one of Gla'aki’s brethren and dwells within the Moore Reservoir of Vermont, in the United States.
Khalk'ru	Khal'kru, All-in-All, Greater-than-Gods	A dark octopoid horror, similar to the Norse Kraken, but dwelling inside a temple somewhere within a hidden warm valley in Alaska. In later works, Khal'kru is explicitly defined as the Black Avatar of Yog-Sothoth. This entity hates all life and matter and seeks to destroy them. It was created by Yog-Sothoth for the purpose of destroying Cthulhu and the Star-spawns of Cthulhu.
Khidina	—	The Demon God Digging Through the Cave.
King in Yellow	Lord of Carcosa	The entity believed to be the king and deity of Carcosa. In the Cthulhu Mythos, it is considered Hastur's most notable immortal avatar. However, it is considered an exceptional entity that likely acts independently of Hastur. According to some theories, this avatar possesses free will, and also has come to wield power rivaling Hastur's. Although rare, there are suggestions that this entity might be an avatar of Nyarlathotep.
Kl'aach-yag	—	A cluster of jellyfish-like organisms shaped like a hemisphere.
Klosmiebhyx	—	Sister of Zstylzhemghi.
K'nar'st	Spawn of the Forgotten	An amphibious humanoid with four, seven-clawed arms, and tentacles in place of legs. The head is lion-like, but bony and his mouth encases three long tongues. He lies trapped beneath the seafloor, inside a mysterious seamount called Nayghof.
Koa	Amorphous horror god	An entity known as the amorphous horror god.
Kojakulhu	Sucking god	Messengers of the gods who take an interest in humans and blend into society.
Krang	The Dead One	A monstrous, brown, leathery, alien entity native to a mysterious planet, currently slumbering within a gigantic mausoleum lost in the desert-wastes, set to guard a priceless treasure made up of the oldest decayed planets.
Krex	Insatiable	Deity Associated with The Eighth Genealogy of Lu-Kthu.
Kugappa	Octopoid god of fractal science	A giant octopus-like deity with numerous tentacles and arms. The tentacles are intricately intertwined, vaguely resembling the double helix structure of DNA.
Kurpannga	The Devil-dingo	A giant hairless dingo-like fiend living in the Dreamlands (or the Dreamtime of Aboriginal myths).
Lam	The Grey	An alien entity, similar to Grey aliens, dwelling in the dark side of the planet Mars.
Leviathan	Father-of-All-Sharks	A giant shark believed to be the son or avatar of Cthulhu.
Lexur'iga-serr'roth	He Who Devours All in the Dark	A photophobic bat-winged monstrosity, with both a thousand-eyed misshapen head and huge maws.
Lilith	Ilyth'la, The Queen of the Night, Night Queen	The Queen of the Night, who is associated with Nyarlathotep (and is said to be his daughter). She was originally an Old One, but was banished to Earth's Dreamlands at some unknown time and became a Great One. However, she may one day regain her power as an Old One. She is also said to be one of the Ancient Ones led by Tawil At'Umr.
Lung Crawthok	—	A god resembling a crustacean, summoned from another dimension, who serves as the guardian of Yog-Sothoth and the Ultimate Gate.
Lythalia	The Forest-Goddess	A female seductive humanoid-entity, covered in both vines and vegetal parts. She has waylaid Elder God Nodens by dark sorcery and had her way with him, bearing him the twin gods Vorvadoss and Yaggdytha. The feline Istasha is the sister of Lythalia.
Mag'han Ark'at	—	A giant egg that keeps growing. Transforming plants and animals into their primitive forms.
Malik Tous	Peacock Angel, Prince of Darkness, Darke Lord	In the real world, the leader of the angels in Yazidism. However, other religions, such as Islam, misinterpreted this entity as a devil. Based on this misinterpretation, it was incorporated into the Cthulhu Mythos. In the Cthulhu Mythos, it is regarded as a peacock devil and the god of darkness in Islam.
Mappo no Ryujin	Harbinger of Doom, Mappo's Dragon	A dragon-like entity, covered in pseudopods, regarded as the mother of the Snake-God Yig and said to be imprisoned beneath the sunken continent of Mu.
MazP'tholohep	Unnameable Child	Deity Associated with The Eighth Genealogy of Lu-Kthu.
M'basui Gwandu	The River Abomination	A spider-eyed bat-winged horror lurking within the Congo River.
Melammu	Older-Than-Old, The Whisper at the End of Time, The Worm in the Apple of the World	A cosmic sandstorm that transcends time and space, dispersing its own body into dust-like particles. It takes on various forms, such as a giant humanoid, a jackal-like beast, and a face with yellow eyes. It infiltrates the bodies of humans who recognize its symbol, absorbing them as sacrifices.
Meph'hibb'anauth	Creeper Under the Stars, Devourer of the Weak, Ever-Hungry	An entity that commands cultists to lead a swarm of strange rats to spread pestilence and destruction to those who do not worship it, and invade.
Miivls	Black Madness	It fought with Vn'vlot over territory at the southwestern tip of the Gondwanaland. They are now both sealed within the Orion Nebula.
Million Malignant Minds	Nemesis (star)	A black spherical nucleus with a million red crystalline eyes, dwelling in the Oort Cloud.
Mlok	—	The deity who landed on Earth in ancient times, somewhere near the Bnazic Desert, known to devour human victims for sustenance.
M'nagalah	The Devourer, The Cancer God, Cthulhu's right-hand man, The Eternal, M'guleloc	A mass of both entrails and eyes, or a massive blob-thing. In Joseph S. Pulver's novel "Nightmare's Disciple", M'Nagalah is called "Cthulhu's right-hand man". In Chaosium's role-playing games, M'Nagalah is regarded as a Great Old One or lesser deity (herald of Gla'aki).
Mnomquah	Lord of the Black Lake, The Monster in the Moon	A very large and eyeless lizard-like creature with a "crown" of feelers.
Mogolith	Demon God	A demon god who seeks to destroy humans by making black rain fall.
Mordiggian	The Charnel God, The Great Ghoul, Lord of Zul-Bha-Sair, Morddoth	A shape-shifting cloud of darkness.
Mormo	The Thousand-Faced Moon	Mormo appears in many forms, but three are most common: as a mocking vampiric maiden, as a tentacle-haired gorgon, or as a hunched toad-like albino with a mass of feelers instead of a face. This last form is the appearance of her servitors, the Moon-beasts.
Mortllgh	Storm of Steel, Cloud of Knowledge	A lustrous orb floating at the center of a whirling vortex of razor-sharp, metallic-looking blades.
Mynoghra	She-Daemon of the Shadows	A succubus-like fiend with alien traits and tentacles in place of hair. She is mentioned as a cousin of the Outer God Nyarlathotep in the O’ Khymer Revelations. She has not been imprisoned, but unlike her cousin, she does not serve as a messenger. Occasionally, she is considered one of the Outer Gods because of her connection and nature. Witch cults in Salem, Oregon, worship her.
Nameless thing	Nameless One, Ancient forgotten one	An evil entity known as the Guardian of the Ancient Gateway, linked to the Van der Heyl family and now in hiding.
Narghal	—	The god of the underworld who enslaves corpses.
Nctosa & Nctolhu	The Twin Spawn of Cthulhu	Twin daughters of Cthulhu, imprisoned in the Great Red Spot of the planet Jupiter. They both appear as huge shell-endowed beings, with eight segmented limbs, and six long arms ending with claws, vaguely resembling their "half-sister" Cthylla.
Necessity	Mother of Invention	A Little God of Invention. It seems to embody the concepts found in cities. It takes people's culture and innovation as a form of faith and manifests itself accordingly.
Ngirrth'lu	The Wolf-Thing, The Stalker in the Snows, He Who Hunts, Na-girt-a-lu	A ferocious and towering wolf-like humanoid with bat wings. He is served by werewolf servants known as the Lupine Ones.
Ng'Thaga	—	The mysterious Great Old One was created by Ted Pons. It appears in his short story ”Haven”.
Nindhoggir	—	An enormous Deep One-type monster. With black skin that shimmers in a greenish iridescent glow and a colossal body covered in scales the size of a human palm, it unleashes utter destruction the moment it awakens. It's likely inspired by Nidhogg.
Norn	—	One of the nornir, goddesses of fate in Norse mythology, who is considered a malevolent deity.
N'rath-Gol	—	The Spawn of Nyarlathotep himself, and one of the countless minions of the Crawling Chaos
Northot	The Forgotten God, The Thing That Should Not Be	A mysterious entity related to Yog-Sothoth, Shub-Niggurath, and possibly Azathoth as well which manifests either as a faun-like humanoid with color-changing hair, or as a glowing halo of unknown color.
Nssu-Ghahnb	The Heart of the Ages, Leech of the Aeons	A sort of gigantic pulsating heart secluded in a parallel dimensions. It is responsible for spawning all of the various monsters which exist within the known Universe.
Nug and Yeb	The Twin Blasphemies	Two horrid nebulous masses of shape-changing vapor from which eyes, tentacles, maws, and hooves emerge; somewhat like Shub-Niggurath. They have been spawned by Yog-Sothoth, and both (or either) are regarded as the blasphemous parents of Cthulhu.
Nush the Eternal	—	A god mentioned as the grandson of Tsathoggua.
Nyaghoggua	The Kraken Within	A blurry, dark, kraken-like entity mentioned in the Song of Yste, and said to dwell in Outer Space.
Nycrama	The Zombifying Essence	A tall larva-like monstrosity, with hundreds of segmented taloned tendrils, exiled by the Elder Gods into a parallel dimension, with close connections to the rainforests of South America, where he lures human victims to enslave from other dimensions. Formerly, he was too an Elder God.
Nyogtha	The Thing which Should Not Be, Haunter of the Red Abyss	Appears as an inky cloud of shadows.
Ny-Rakath	—	An Outer God or a Great Old One who is a goat-like fiendish horror with bat wings and multiple horns, mentioned as the brother of Shub-Niggurath.
Ob'mbu	The Shatterer	A giraffe-like reptilian monster.
Odin	—	The chief deity of Norse mythology who hates humans.
Okkokoku	eldest-giantess of enmity	One of the Daemon-Sirens, daughters of Azathoth.
Ōmononushi no Mikoto	—	Ōmononushi no Mikoto resides on Mount Miwa and is the deity of the spirits of the surrounding mountains and fields, as well as the god of snakes. He is sometimes mistaken for Yig, but he has a stronger religious connection to humans. As seen in Japanese mythology, he possesses a dual nature: he is a vengeful and wrathful deity, and he is a guardian deity who watches over human success and prosperity. He is considered one of the Great Old Ones or Elder Gods.
Ong	—	The lion-headed god of pain is worshiped in a city, Yondo.
Oorn (H. P. Lovecraft and R. H. Barlow entity)	—	A pudgy creature with short grey-colored fur and three small red eyes, and was found on the outskirts of the city of Zeth. While it hasn't demonstrated actual intelligence, it can mimic speech.
Oorn (Brian Lumley entity)	Mnomquah's Mate	Appears as a huge, tentacled mollusk.
Ootoo	—	A Minor Old One with a gigantic head, whose body is a geometric labyrinth connecting to different dimensions.
Ormazd	Great and merciful, Cruel god	A god who sealed off the world with a wall of ice and designated the world beyond the wall as the realm of the dead. It claims human souls as its own and lets none escape its control. Although this god has the same name as Ahura Mazda, the supreme deity of Zoroastrianism, the two deities have almost nothing in common other than their names.
Othuum	The Oceanic Horror, Knight of Cthulhu	A subordinate Great Old One who serves Cthulhu. This deity is a twisting tentacled mass, with a single alien face somewhere in the center of the slimy squirming mass.
Othuyeg	The Doom-Walker	Appears as a great tentacled eye similar to Cyäegha, but much more similar to the monster featured in the horror movie The Crawling Eye. He currently dwells within the subsoil of Kansas, in the fabled Seven Cities of Gold.
Perse	—	A maddening, twisted-minded, alien entity appearing as a feminine figure in a red cloak, with three eyes, and an utterly alien face. Likely coincident with Classical Underworld goddess Persephone, she manifest aboard a ghost ship and contact traumatized humans, with hidden artistic talent, to spread both chaos and despair across the world.
Pharol	Pharol the Black	A black, fanged, cycloptic demon with arms like swaying serpents. The entity normally dwells in another dimension—a "seething and sub-dimensional chaos" beyond the mundane universe. The wizard Eibon of Hyperborea sometimes summoned Pharol to query him for arcane information. In Chaosium's role-playing games, Pharol is regarded as a Lesser Old One or a Unique Being. Pharol once led two lesser deities, Lsa and Saig, but they have since vanished.
Pnaklendorf	The Iron Venus	The deity who is the passive counterpart of the Ubbo-Sathla, and, like it, remains inactive, immersed in a kind of slumber. It is connected to the earth and occasionally manifests through bodies it materializes.
Pneeph Taal	—	A god who absorbs human vitality, appearing like smoke or mist.
Por-Kyei Pe'yugg	—	The god of the snout, worshipped since ancient times.
Poseidon	—	A powerful extragalactic entity, awed by ‘Ymnar. It battled against the Elder God Paighon.
Psuchawrl	The Elder One	A tall humanoid with an eyeless sea anemone-like face, and a beaked grinning mouth, who can be summoned like a jinn.
Ptar-Axtlan	The Leopard That Stalks the Night	A mysterious entity related to zoomorphic shapeshifters, especially were-cats.
Ptmâk	—	The entity is believed to be the creator of Cthulhu. It is also said to be another name for Nug in Hyperborea or his consort.
Qom-maq	—	The dark deity who gave birth to the Minotaur.
Quachil Uttaus	Treader of the Dust	Appears as a miniature, wrinkled mummy with stiff, outstretched claws.
Quyagen	The Eye of Z'ylsm, He Who Dwells Beneath Our Feet	Worshiped as a deity in a lost continent located in the southern Atlantic Ocean. He appears related to Nyarlathotep, and his form is likely octopoid, with myriads of horns along a maddening body.
Q'yth-az	The Crystalloid Intellect	A towering mass of crystals, residing on the lightless planet Mthura. Hiding within numerous crystal bodies that appear to be its alter egos, it whispers telepathically to humans.
Raandaii-B'nk	—	A shark-like humanoid native to the Bermuda Triangle, possibly similar to Cthulhu's avatar the Father of All Sharks.
Ragman	God of poverty	A Little God of poverty. It seems to embody the concepts found in cities. It takes people's culture and innovation as a form of faith and manifests itself accordingly.
Ragnalla	Seeker in the Skies	A titanic raptorial fiend with a huge, single eye and a crown of tentacles.
Rahb	—	The younger brother of Ghizguth and Hziulquoigmnzhah. Idh-Yaa's lover.
Raphanasuan	The One from the Sun Race	A gigantic and likely multi-armed fiend.
Reguz'nipev	The Fathomless One's amorphous bulk	A Lesser Old One that uses a female human as its sensory organ.
Rhagorthua	Father of All Winds	A fiery entity similar to Cthugha, able to absorb nuclear radiation, and imprisoned somewhere within the subsoil of New Mexico.
Rhagoxe-Hyeyo	The Moon Without Oracle, Ragoze-Hiiyo	The entity appears in relation to the cross-shaped shadow on the full moon.
Rhan-Tegoth	Terror of the Hominids, He of the Ivory Throne	A three-eyed, gilled, proboscidian monster with a globular torso, six, long sinuous limbs ending in black paws, with crab-like claws, and covered in what appears to be hair, but is actually tiny tentacles.
Rhogog	The Bearer of the Cup of the Blood of the Ancients	A black leafless oak tree, hot to the touch and with a single red eye at the center. It bears Cthulhu's blood.
Rh'Thulla of the Wind	—	Mentioned in the American comic book Challengers of the Unknown #81–87 (1977) as the brother of M'Nagalah.
Rig	Eater of Time	Deity Associated with The Eighth Genealogy of Lu-Kthu.
Rlim Shaikorth	The White Worm	A gigantic, whitish worm with a huge maw and hollow eyes made of dripping globules of blood. In a few of novels, Rlim Shaikorth is regarded as a Lesser Old One (serves Aphoom-Zhah).
Rokon	—	A mysterious extra-dimensional entity, regarded as the brother of Yig, ruling over a dimension called Zandanua.
Rynvik		Surrounded by a harem, he lives his life immersed in the crimson lake of Tyryar. The mother of his three sons is Kassogtha, one of Cthulhu's sisters.
Saaitii	The Hog	A gigantic, ghostly hog. In Chaosium's role-playing games, Saaitii is regarded as a Lesser Old One or a Unique Being.
Scathach	—	One of Hziulquoigmnzhah's children, supposedly female.
Sebek	Sobek, The Crocodile God, the Scaled one Suchos	A crocodile-headed reptilian humanoid, probably equal to the Ancient Egyptian god Sobek. Sebek probably serve for Nyarlathotep. In Chaosium's role-playing games, Sebek is regarded as a Lesser Old One or the most powerful Lloigor (species).
Sedmelluq	The Great Manipulator, Ishmagon	A colossal glowing worm, with a starfish-shaped head, dwelling in Antarctica and served by the Mi-go.
Sekhmet	—	A bloodthirsty goddess of slaughter from Egyptian mythology, sometimes related to the Elder God Bast (Sekhmet is the more ferocious and cruel goddess than Bast). Sekhmet is stronger than Cthulhu and a rebel against the Elder Gods, a follower of Sutekh (Set, an avatar of Nyarlathotep).
Serpent Gods	Ryūjin (Dragon Gods)	They are sometimes mistaken for Yig. However, they are actually lesser deities from another realm, distinct from Yig. Some of the serpent deities and Ryūjin found around the world are among them (however, not all Serpent Gods and Ryūjin are considered Great Old Ones; many of them are Gods of Earth. This classification is limited to monsters appearing from different realms—evil deities who also bring calamity).
Set	Satha, Sutekh	A dark, venomous serpent deity feared since prehistoric times in Egypt and many other eras and regions. Some sources depict it as an avatar of Hastur and Nyarlathotep, and an alias of Yig.
Sfatlicllp	The Fallen Wisdom	The granddaughter of Tsathoggua, an amorphous mass which mated with a Hyperborean Voormi and spawned the legendary thief Knygathin Zhaum. In Chaosium's Dead Leaves Fall RPG supplement, she appears as a fiend with oily snakes skin, and prehensile dreadlocks like a Gorgon.
Shabbat Cycloth	Lady of a Thousand Hooks	The goddess of a swarm of sharp, black-and-green, lamprey-like creatures.
Shaila-Na-Gog	—	The Grotesque Guardian Goddess of the Druid Order.
Shaklatal	The Eye of Wicked Sight, Amun	A dark-skinned humanoid horror with tentacles sprouting from his head, and glowing red eyes, worshiped by the earliest African civilizations as the god Amun. He is said to be rival of Cthulhu.
Shal-Wiggurt	—	One of the Ancient Ones, Lesser Quasi-Gods. It is a big blind worm. It fell to Earth from the void of space and was sealed within the underground fortress of Arkham by the Elder Gods. Due to its immense size, its mouth is often mistaken for the entrance to the caverns.
Shathak	Mistress of the Abyssal Slime, Death Reborn, Zishaik, Chushaik	Not described, likely an amorphous mass.
Shaurash-Ho	—	Mysterious entity mentioned in Howard Phillips Lovecraft's letter to James F. Morton as a descendant of Cthulhu which spawned other two horrid descendants (K'baa the Serpent and Ghoth the Burrower). The latter would have sired with a Roman noblewoman Viburnia the legendary ancestor of Lovecraft himself in a fictional family tree. The appearance of Shaurash-Ho has never been described.
Sheb-Teth	Devourer of Souls	An eyeless alien humanoid entity, massively overgrown with both strange flesh and machinery.
Shellazen-Matti	Oracle	An entity believed to be the daughter of the Cthulhu Trust.
Shista	God of Fidelity	A shape-shifting entity, often manifesting as a spiny five-legged crab, with a spider-like head and metallic bracelets on each limb.
Shlithneth	—	A gigantic slimy worm, with a mass of black tentacles surrounding its maw.
Sho-Gath	The God in the Box, The Big Black Thing	A dark smoky column, with red malevolent eyes and a grotesque face, imprisoned inside a vintage box.
Shog Gormagog	Gibbering Lord in the Burning Mist	A fiery entity with a massive, yellow, pus-filled eye and two spiral tentacles.
Shterot	The Tenebrous One	A starfish-like horror spawned by the Outer God C'thalpa. It has been cut into pieces, but individual fragments live independently.
Shudde M'ell	The Burrower Beneath, The Great Chthonian	Appears as a colossal worm with tentacles for a head.
Shuy-Nihl	The Devourer in the Earth	A dark blob of darkness endowed with tentacles.
Silenus	—	A deity of mist and gas, who embodies the heat death of the universe itself.
Skoll	—	The Wolf from Norse Mythology That Devours the Sun.
Sleeping deity	—	A sea god slumbering on the seabed near Asparagus Island. He has bat wings and snake hair, and his entire body is covered in mucus.
Slidith	Lord of Blood	One of the three primal lords of Lemuria and an aspect of the Triple God of Chaos.
Smoke Thing	Formless god of pollution and industry	A Little God of pollution and industry. It seems to embody the concepts found in cities. It takes people's culture and innovation as a form of faith and manifests itself accordingly.
Soth-Mrg'ral	—	Deity Associated with The Eighth Genealogy of Lu-Kthu.
Star-Spawn	King of Sea	Unlike ordinary Star-Spawn of Cthulhu, he is a god who is Cthulhu’s younger brother and the King of the Atlantic.
Sthanee	The Lost One	A gigantic marine horror with twelve snaky-limbs, endowed with suckers, and a beard of tentacles, both served and revered by vicious merfolk, known as the "Children of Sthanee".
Sthood	—	The Spirit Sealed Within the Idol of Dreamland.
S'tya-Yg'Nalle	The Whiteness	An invisible entity made of both snow and chill, servitor of Ithaqua.
Summanus	Monarch of the Night, The Terror that Walketh in Darkness	A mouthless, grotesque humanoid with pale tentacles protruding from underneath a dark robe. It is based on the Roman deity of the same name.
Swarog	—	A hideous being appearing as a dark, gigantic, legless bird-like horror swathed in dark flames, with its long neck topped by a black lump, half of which endowed with a big glowing eye and the other being covered in innumerable tentacles. It was revered by Slavic and Viking folks as the Solar god Svarog, though sharing almost nothing with the traditional deity.
Syrx-Crugoth	—	A cluster of tiny, sparkling crystal shards. Driven by malice and a thirst for blood, it seeks to bring about the destruction of humanity.
Tétaquo	—	A god that controls humans with an egg-shaped head and an insect-like body.
Thamogorgos	Lord of the abyss	A devil in Zothique whom the wizard Namirrha turned to destroy Ummaos.
Thamuth-Djig	—	One of the Cthulhu Cycle Deities.
Thanaroa	The Shining One	A mysterious evil entity, manifesting as a pillar of dazzling light, dwelling in the ruins of Nan Madol, near Ponape. Its name recalls that of Polynesian creator god Tangaroa.
Tharapithia	The Shadow in the Crimson Light	Slavic and Ugric God-like creature, photophobic and burrowing fiend awed in the Middle Ages. It cannot endure sunlight, and eludes it by tunneling deep underneath the roots of oak trees.
Thasaidon	Lord of the Seven Hells, Master of the Endless Void	A malignant entity manifesting as a mace-wielding armored warrior. He is revered as the Principle of Evil in Zothique, but his cult dates back to the time of Mu. Thasaidon is generally considered the most powerful of the evil deities of Zothique.
Thog	The Demon-God of Xuthal	An octopoid monster of Hyborian Age, which haunts the underground city of Xuthal.
Thromb	—	The demon lurking in the darkness of space.
Th'rygh	The God-Beast	A monstrous entity manifesting as a horrible patchwork of flesh, soil, and alien matter.
Thulo	Lord of Pain	A god of pain resembling a demon or a dragon, with a serpent's head and body, three twisted horns, and four arms.
Thusa	cloud-grey cauldron-tender	One of the Daemon-Sirens, daughters of Azathoth.
T'ith	—	The offspring of Cthulhu and the Elder God Sk'tai. He is probably an Elder God rather than a Great Old One because Sk'tai left Cthulhu while T'ith was pregnant and married Kthanid, and Kthanid raised T'ith.
Toad God	The Thing on the Roof	A Great Old One or a Lesser Old One worshipped by an ancient tribe in Central America during the pre-Columbian era, and it laid dormant for thousands of years in its own temple.
Toth	−	A colossal, burrowing arthropod-like horror.
Traveler on Oceans of Night	the Stepper Across the Stars	A mysterious entity who creates and travels through their own dream world.
Treader of Stars	−	The immortal god born from the darkness between the stars, using an infant as a vessel.
Tree of Azathoth	Artificial god	A red tree with branches resembling exposed muscle tissue, possessing the power to create a gateway that physically transports one to the Dreamlands. Twelve human faces writhe on its trunk. It utters words of revelation when human lives are sacrificed to it.
Trembleweed	−	A humanoid jungle deity with greenish-gray skin, resembling a blend of reptiles, insects, and plants.
Tsathoggua	The Sleeper of N'kai, The Toad-God, Zhothaqqua, Sadagowah	Appears as a huge, furry, almost humanoid toad, or a bat-like sloth.
Tsocathra	−	A deity currently sealed within the very essence of the spell, whose body is composed of both spirit and matter.
Tulushuggua	The Watery Dweller Beneath	A mysterious subterranean horror, dwelling deep within the flooded caves of Florida, served by the eel-like horrors known as the Tulush.
Turua	Father of the Swamps, The Bayou Plant God	A fungine entity with both tentacles and tendrils, which haunts the swamplands of Florida, somehow similar to The Green God.
Typhon	Monstrous Dragon	The greatest monster god in Greek mythology. In the Cthulhu Mythos, it is sometimes considered a minor avatar of Set or Nyarlathotep or a powerful Unique Entity.
Ugghiutu	The Outsider	The deity from another dimension worshipped in Punktown. It is most commonly depicted in a manner similar to the symbol it usually represents: a spiral that depicts the nucleus of a gargantuan eye, surrounded by a corona of black tentacles. It is said to lie sleeping beyond the stars, having been imprisoned countless years ago by a race of enemy gods.
Uitzilcapac	Lord of Pain	A sadistic entity trapped by the Elder Gods in a remote dimension of the Space-Time continuum, and appearing as a 4-m tall lizard-like horror with six legs, and a mouth filled with vicious fangs.
Ult		The child of Rynvik and Kassogtha.
Umôrdhoth	the Devourer Below	A dark mass shaped like a worm. An impartial deity worshipped by ghouls.
'Umr at-Tawil	Tawil At'Umr, The Most Ancient One	Servant or Avatar of Outer God Yog-Sothoth. It is basically considered an Outer God, just as Yog-Sothoth is.
The Unimaginable Horror	Oroarchan, The Great Color, The Sleeper in Water	A gigantic version of The Colour from Space imprisoned in Earth's oceans by Cthulhu's people.
Unknown God	−	The Great Old One or Outer God, who is sealed in Antarctica and released the Animiculi.
Ut'Ulls-Hr'Her	The Great Horned Mother, Black Glory of Creation	A huge faceless creature with various appendages sprouting from its head, a beard of oozing horns, many reddish teats, and fish-like fins sprouting from an egg-shaped body.
Uvhash	The Blood-Mad god of the Void	It appears as a colossal, vampiric, red mass of both tentacles and eyes. It dwells within the realm of Rhylkos, which matches the red planet Mars, and whoever summons Uvhash witnesses an atrocious death. This deity is occasionally considered an Outer God.
Vagalith	−	The Beach Deity Seeking a Role in a Movie.
Vastarara	−	The god of fire driven mad by rage and of fertility.
Vhuzompha	Mother and Father to All Marine Life, The Hermaphroditic God	An amorphous monster of prodigious size, covered in a multitude of eyes, mouths, projections, and both male and female genitalia.
Vibur	The Thing from Beyond	A huge, furry, and rapidly shifting entity casting radioactive stones.
Vile-Oct	—	A dragon-like or reptilian entity said to be familiar of Yig.
Vn'vlot	Annihilation of Light	It fought with Miivls over territory at the southwestern tip of the Gondwanaland. They are now both sealed within the Orion Nebula.
Volgna-Gath	Keeper of Secrets	A slimy shape-shifting mass, which can be summoned with mud and the blood of the invoker.
Voltiyig	Yig's Terrifying Son	Spawn of the Snake-God Yig, appearing as a winged and feathered serpent with flaming nostrils, somehow similar to the Aztec God Quetzalcoatl, trapped inside a dark tower topped with a giant five-pointed star.
Vthyarilops	The Starfish God	A tentacled horror similar to a Sun Star, but endowed with branching tentacles, spines, myriads of blue glaring eyes, and gaping-maws.
Vulthoom	The Sleeper of Ravermos, Gsarthotegga	May appear as a huge, unearthly plant.
Weisser Hirsch	legendary white stag	A legendary white stag, larger than an elephant, and the husband of Hialdiabrun.
The Worm that Gnaws in the Night	Doom of Shaggai	A massive worm-like fiend similar to a Graboid from Tremors.
Xalafu	The Dread One	A titanic, globular mass of various dark colors, endowed with a huge single-eye in the middle of the alien bulk.
Xcthol	The Goat God	A sadistic, mind-controlling, faun-like humanoid, likely related to Shub-Niggurath.
Xinlurgash	The Ever-Consuming	A bristly-mass with large gaping maws, made up with tentacles and spider-like limbs.
Xirdneth	Maker of Illusions, Lord of Unreality	An illusion-making entity with no true form.
Xothra	The Hidden Devourer	A lesser Old One who serves Yidhra and is an avatar of Yidhra.
Xoxiigghua	—	A three-eyed, octopoid, and parasitic horror trapped inside a Central American mountain range.
X's For Eyes	Ghostly child-god of the lost and forgotten	A Little ghostly child-god of the lost and forgotten. It seems to embody the concepts found in cities. It takes people's culture and innovation as a form of faith and manifests itself accordingly.
Xu'bea	Teeth of the Dark Plains of Mwaalba	The god about whom almost nothing is known.
Xylarthoth	The Chittering Abyss	The deity who takes the form of a nightmarish insectoid and spider-like amalgamation.
Yabou	—	A deity referred to as a child of Tsathoggua.
Yamata no Orochi	Orochi, Kuzuryū Myōjin	Yamata no Orochi is massive, multi-headed dragon-serpent originating from Japanese mythology. In the Cthulhu Mythos, Yamata no Orochi is regarded as either the Star-spawn of Cthulhu, who attained immense magical power and ascended to apotheosis, or another dimension super-hot energy entity has taken the form of a gigantic dragon.
Yamath	Yama	Worshiped in ancient Lemuria. Aspect of the Triple God of Chaos. Known as Yama, king of demons, in Tibet.
Yegg-Ha	The Faceless One	A 10-foot tall winged being which rules over the Nightgaunts, before being defeated in ancient Britain by a centuria of Roman soldiers. However, by collecting bones, it can be revived. In Chaosium's role-playing games and some novels, Yegg-Ha is regarded as a Lesser Old One or Unique Being (Ｍaster of the Nightgaunts and serves Yibb-Tstll).
Y'golonac	The Defiler	Appears as a naked, obese, headless humanoid with a mouth in the palm of each hand; other features are nebulous.
Yhagni	—	A hideous female or hermaphroditic entity of tremendous power, cousin of Cthulhu and Hastur, imprisoned by the Great Old Ones being themselves aware of her powers. She dwells within the "Temple of Pillars," in the depths of Kyartholm located somewhere in the Northern Hemisphere. Her appearance is never described, but likely formless, larva-like, and tentacled as depicted in the minion-spawn which serve her parasitizing human victims.
Y'hath	—	A lesser Old One who serves Yidhra and is an avatar of Yidhra.
Yhashtur	The Worm-God of the Lords of Thule	A worm-like monster dwelling at Northern Polar latitudes, said to be the rival or inimical to Nyarlathotep.
Yibb-Tstll	The Patient One	An immobile, dark, tentacled entity with a pulpy, alien head, detached eyes, and large bat wings. She watches at the center of all time as the universe revolves. She is also often considered one of the Outer Gods.
Yidhra	Yee-Tho-Rah	She is worshipped as a beautiful, awesome, and terrible earth-mother. She has gained the ability to take on the characteristics of any creature she devours. She is also usually considered one of the Outer Gods.
Yig	Father of Serpents	A giant snake with human-like arms covered in scales. Son of the Mappo's Dragon, children of his are Ayi'ig and Voltiyig, whereas Rokon is regarded as the brother of Yig.
Y'lla	Master of the Seas	A monstrous, barrel-shaped sea worm with tentacles and a lamprey-like mouth.
'Ymnar	The Dark Stalker	A shape-shifting entity spawned by the Outer God Ngyr-Korath to serve him only. It may grant great powers to whoever chooses to serve him and his master, but his final aim is the destruction of all sentient and intelligent life in the Cosmos.
Y'mo-Thog		A mysterious god who dwells on the planet Thuggon.
Y'n-Tharqqua	Mad God	A quite minor mad deity worshipped in Hyperborea. It is enshrined in a box just large enough to barely fit a child.
Yog-Sapha	The Dweller of the Depths, Lord of the Things Which Dwell Beneath the Surface	A gigantic, amoebic, glowing, and multihued gelatinous mass living within the dark depths of Earth.
Yogthutu	—	An artificial Ancient One created in Punktown based on information about many of the Great Old Ones.
Yorith	The Oldest Dreamer	A huge crystalline-being residing in the seas of the ocean planet Yilla. Its hypnotic abilities force those spacefarers, who stray too closely, to suddenly plunge into the depths of its lethal sea.
Yoth-Tlaggon	—	The giant slug worshipped on Yuggoth.
Ysbaddaden	Chief of the Giants	One of Hziulquoigmnzhah's children, supposedly male and gigantic.
Ythogtha	The Thing in the Pit	Appears as a colossal Deep One, with tentacles surrounding its one eye.
Yug-Siturath	The All-Consuming Fog	A vampiric vaporous entity which adsorbs vital forces.
Yululun	Keeper of the Tombs	A minor deity whose office is to protect the sanctity of tombs in Zothique. This deity is believed to punish grave robbers, but in reality, the graves had been desecrated and cursed (Yululun is considered to have an Evil tendency).
Yu-meng'tis	Abhorrent One, The Consumer	A massive deity of bulimia, said to be connected to Y'golonac.
Za'kul'dra-Zal	—	Servant of Hastur.
Zathog	The Black Lord of Whirling Vortices	A festering, bubbling mass that constantly churns and whirls, putting forth vestigial appendages and reabsorbing them. Bubbles burst on the surface to reveal hate-filled eyes, and slobbering mouths form or close randomly about his horrible body. He dwells in the Xentilx galaxy, served by the Zarrian aliens.
Zhar and Lloigor	The Twin Obscenities	Both appear as a colossal mass of tentacles, trapped inside the "Plateau of Sung," somewhere in Myanmar. They are probably the children of Hastur and serve him.
Zindarak	The Fiery Messenger	A mysterious fiery entity, that shall release Cthulhu from his prison once the stars are right.
Zog-Yesseriyal	—	The brother of Cthulhu and who seeks to shatter Cthulhu's dream.
Zoth-Ommog	The Dweller in the Depths	A gigantic entity with a cone-shaped body, a reptilian head, a beard of tentacles, and starfish-like arms.
Zstylzhemghi	Matriarch of Swarms, Zystulzhemgni	Spawn of the Outer God Ycnàgnnisssz, described as a living alien swarm. She also has a sister named Klosmiebhyx.
Zum-Trivalis	Titular Rat God, Lord of Vermin	The god who has spider legs and a scorpion's tail, and of Vermin and Rat.
Zurvan	That Which Is (Not)	A god who worshipped by Howard Ashcroft and his cultists.
Zushakon	Dark Silent One, Old Night, Zul-Che-Quon, Zuchequon	Appears as a swirling, black vortex, revered by the Mutsune Native Americans as a dire death god. He is also worshiped by mysterious servitors known as the Hidden Ones.
Z'toggua	—	An obese bat-winged humanoid with a long polypous snout and a wide mouth, opening in the belly, served by the Deep Ones.
Zvilpogghua	Feaster from the Stars, The Sky-Devil, Ossadagowah	A bat-winged, armless toad with tentacles instead of a face.

Other than that, in Joseph S. Pulver's novel Nightmare's Disciple several new Great Old Ones and Elder Gods are named. The novel mentions D'numl Cthulhu's female cousin, Xu'bea (The Teeth of the Dark Plains of Mwaalba). Miivls and Vn'Vulot, are said to have fought each other in southern Gondwanaland during the Cretaceous period. Whereas Rynvyk, regarded as one of the mates of Cthulhu's sister Kassogtha, is a similar entity to Cthulhu. Kassogtha would have sired Rynvyk three sons (one named Ult) and Rynvyk himself currently rests in a crimson pool in the Hall of Tyryar (likely another name or dimension of R'lyeh), whose portal is located somewhere in Norway.

== A ==
=== Aphoom-Zhah ===
Aphoom-Zhah (the Cold Flame) debuted in Lin Carter's short story "The Acolyte of the Flame" (1985)—although the being was first mentioned in an earlier tale by Carter, "The Horror in the Gallery" (1976). Aphoom-Zhah is also mentioned in Carter's "The Light from the Pole" (1980), a story Carter wrote from an early draft by Clark Ashton Smith. Smith later developed this draft into "The Coming of the White Worm" (1941).

Aphoom-Zhah is the progeny of Cthugha and is worshipped as the Lord of the Pole because he dwells, like Ithaqua, above the Arctic Circle. Aphoom-Zhah frequently visited Hyperborea during the last ice age. His legend is chronicled in the Pnakotic Manuscripts.

Aphoom-Zhah appears as a vast, cold, grey flame that freezes whatever it touches. The being came to Earth from the star Fomalhaut, briefly visiting the planet Yaksh (Neptune) before taking up residence in Mount Yarak, a legendary mountain atop the North Pole. When the Elder Gods tried to imprison him beneath the pole, Aphoom-Zhah erupted with such fury that he froze the lands around him. Aphoom-Zhah is believed to be responsible for the glaciation that eventually overwhelmed Hyperborea, Zobna, and Lomar.

Though no human cult worships this being, Aphoom-Zhah is revered by the Gnophkeh, the Voormi, and his own race of minions; the spectral Ylidheem.

=== Atlach-Nacha ===
In Clark Ashton Smith's short story The Seven Geases (1934), Atlach-Nacha (The Spider God) is the reluctant recipient of a human sacrifice given to it by the toad-god Tsathoggua.

Atlach-Nacha resembles a huge spider with an almost-human face. It dwells within a huge cavern deep beneath Mount Voormithadreth, a mountain in the now vanished kingdom of Hyperborea in the Arctic. There it spins a gigantic web, bridging a massive chasm between the Dreamlands and the waking world. Some believe that when the web is complete, the end of the world will come, because it will create a permanent junction with the Dreamlands, allowing monsters to move freely into the waking world.

Atlach-Nacha probably came to Earth from the planet Cykranosh (Saturn) with Tsathoggua. Because of its appearance, Atlach-Nacha is often referred to as the Spider-God(dess) and is believed to be the regent of all spiders. Furthermore, the giant, bloated purple spiders of Leng are thought to be its children and servitors.

There is a disagreement about its gender. In Smith's original story, Atlach-Nacha is referred to as a male, but in later stories by other authors, it is implied to be a female.

== B ==
=== Bokrug ===
Bokrug (The Great Water Lizard) first appeared in Lovecraft's short story "The Doom That Came to Sarnath" (1920). The being is also part of Lovecraft's Dream Cycle.

Bokrug is the god of the semi-amphibian Thuum'ha of Ib, in the land of Mnar. The deity slept beneath the calm waters of a lake which bordered both Ib and the city of Sarnath. When the humans of Sarnath cruelly slaughtered the populace of Ib and stole the god's idol, the deity was awakened. Each year thereafter, strange ripples disturbed the otherwise placid lake. On the one-thousandth anniversary of Ib's destruction, Bokrug rose up and destroyed Sarnath (so utterly that not even ruins remained). Afterwards, the Thuum'ha recolonized Ib and henceforth lived undisturbed.

Occasionally, Bolrug is regarded as a Lesser Old One (serves Mnomquah).

=== Byatis ===
Byatis (The Berkeley Toad, The Serpent-Bearded, The God of Forgetfulness) is a deity who appears as a gigantic, multicolored toad with a single eye, claws similar to a crabs and a beard of tentacles. Byatis has been associated with Yig and Han, as among the "gods of divination". It is depicted as incredibly large - one of its facial tentacles is as thick as a man which makes it about the size of the castle that it is trapped beneath. It can be repelled by the Elder Sign.

In ancient times, The idol of Byatis was brought down to earth by the Deep Ones. Some time later, under unknown circumstances, Byatis itself was sealed behind a stone door in what would later become the Severn Valley. However, he feasts upon those who stray to him, and from those upon whom he feasts he draws a part of their vitality, and so grows vaster.

== C ==
=== Chaugnar Faugn ===
Some were the figures of well-known myth — gorgons, chimaeras, dragons, cyclops, and all their shuddersome congeners. Others were drawn from darker and more furtively whispered cycles of subterranean legend — black, formless Tsathoggua, many-tentacled Cthulhu, proboscidian Chaugnar Faugn, and other rumoured blasphemies from forbidden books like the Necronomicon, the Book of Eibon, or the Unaussprechlichen Kulten of von Junzt.
—H. P. Lovecraft, "The Horror in the Museum" (emphasis added)

Chaugnar Faugn (The Elephant God, The Horror from the Hills) was created by Frank Belknap Long and first appeared in his novel The Horror from the Hills (1931).

Chaugnar Faugn (or Chaugnar Faughn) appears as a horribly grotesque idol, made of an unknown element, combining the worst aspects of octopus, elephant, and human being. When Chaugnar Faugn hungers, he can move incredibly quickly for his size, and use his lamprey-like "trunk" to drain the blood from any organism he encounters.

Chaugnar Faugn came to Earth from another dimension eons ago, possibly in a form other than the one which he later assumed. Upon arriving, he found the dominant lifeforms to be only simple amphibians. From these creatures, he created the Miri Nigri to be his servitors. The Miri Nigri would later mate with early humans to produce hybrids that would eventually evolve into the horrid Tcho-Tcho people.

=== Cthugha ===
Cthugha (The Living Flame) is a fictional deity in the Cthulhu Mythos genre of horror fiction, the creation of August Derleth. In Derleth's version of the Cthulhu Mythos, Cthugha is a Great Old One, an elemental spirit of fire opposed to the Elder Gods. Derleth set its homeworld as the star Fomalhaut, which had featured in Lovecraft's poetry. He first appeared in Derleth's short story "The House on Curwen Street" (1944). Cthugha resembles a giant ball of fire. He is served by the Flame Creatures of Cthugha. Fthaggua, regent of the fire vampires, may be his progeny. He has at least one other known progeny, the being known as Aphoom-Zhah.

Cthugha is in conflict with the Outer God Nyarlathotep and is also Nyarlathotep's arch-enemy. In Derleth's short story “The Dweller in the Darkness” (1944), Cthugha burns down N'gai, Nyarlathotep's base on Earth. In addition, it has been suggested that he may have some connection to the Outer God Yomagn'tho, and is said to possess roughly equal power. Therefore, Cthugha is thought to possess power matching or slightly below that of the Outer Gods, and it is also thought that there is hostility between Cthugha and the Outer Gods.

=== Cthylla ===
Cthylla (the Secret Daughter of Cthulhu) is a fictional character in the Cthulhu Mythos of H. P. Lovecraft. Cthylla was created by Brian Lumley, who originally mentioned her in his Titus Crow novel The Transition Of Titus Crow (1975), though he never actually described her. Tina L. Jens, however, depicted Cthylla as a gigantic winged-octopus in her short story "In His Daughter's Darkling Womb" (1997).

Even if Cthulhu’s physical form is destroyed, he can be reborn and resurrected by taking refuge in Cthylla’s womb. For this reason, her existence is kept secret, and she is guarded by Dagon and Hydra.

=== Cyäegha ===
Cyäegha (The Destroying Eye, The Dark That Waits) appeared in the short story "Darkness, My Name Is" written by Eddy C. Bertin.

Cyäegha is a god characterized by nihilism and a profound contempt for all things. His form is a green eye with a massive black body surrounded by countless tentacles. Existing since time immemorial, Cyäegha's slumbers in a vast cave beneath the “Dark Hill,” Dunkelhügel, in Germany. While Cyäegha's worshippers draw vitality from this god, they deeply fear awakening it, as its wrath is said to be terrifying.

=== Cynothoglys ===
Cynothoglys (The Mortician God) first appeared in Thomas Ligotti's short story "The Prodigy of Dreams" (1994). The being appears as a shapeless, multiform entity with a single arm used for catching those who summoned her, and bringing them a painless, ecstatic death. In ancient times, she once held a small cult in Italy, which paid her homage rather than worshiping her, since actual worship would be the same as summoning the god. They considered her to be no mere Cloacina, but the mortician of all creatures, even the gods themselves.

== D ==
=== Dweller in the Gulf ===
The Dweller in the Gulf (Eidolon of the Blind) appears in a short story of the same name by Clark Ashton Smith, first published in 1932. The Dweller in the Gulf lives deep beneath the surface of the planet Mars, but may have originated elsewhere. It is worshipped exclusively by a blind, troglodyte sect of the Martian race, the Aihai, and can be ritually summoned by the stroking of its idol.

The Dweller resembles a massive, eyeless, soft-shelled tortoise, but has a triangular head and two whiplike tails. At the ends of its tails are two bell-shaped suckers used for the ceremonial—usually forced—removal of its discoverer's eyes, turning them into the deity's blind, mute servitors.

== E ==
=== Eihort ===
Eihort (God of the Labyrinth) first appeared "in person" in Ramsey Campbell's short story "Before the Storm" (1980). However, the being was first mentioned in Campbell's "The Franklyn Paragraphs" (1973) and "Cold Print" (1969)

Eihort lives within a network of tunnels deep beneath the Severn Valley, in England. It appears as a "bloated blanched oval, supported on a myriad of fleshless legs" with eyes continuously forming in its gelatinous body. When it captures a human, it offers the captive a "bargain". If the captive refuses, Eihort rams the victim violently to death. If the captive accepts the offer, the horror implants its immature "brood" inside the victim's body. The brood will eventually mature, and kill their host. According to the Revelations of Gla'aki, after the fall of humanity, Eihort's brood will be born into light.

"Ei" and "Hort" are nouns of the modern German language, "Ei" meaning "egg" and "Hort" meaning "hoard".

== G ==
=== Gla'aki ===
Gla'aki (The Inhabitant of the Lake) is a deity who dwells in a lake near Brichester, England. It resembles a slug in appearance, with eyes at the tips of three stalk-like structures extending from its face; its body is covered with pyramid-shaped protrusions, and metallic spines extend from its back.

It stabs humans with the tips of its tentacles, injecting chemicals into their blood to enslave them. If the tentacles are severed, the victim dies, but the corpse revives as a zombie and becomes a slave to Graaki. These zombies begin to decay rapidly when exposed to strong light after about 70 years, but are virtually immortal otherwise.

=== Gloon ===
Gloon (The Corrupter of Flesh) first appeared in H.P. Lovecraft's short story "The Temple" as a Dionysian statue. Whether Lovecraft intended the statue to be anything other than the centerpiece of a piece of weird fiction is debatable. In 2004, Chaosium released an expanded bestiary to the Mythos which included the entity of Gloon, attributing some non-canonical eldritch and limacine attributes to the entity, a counterpoint to its outwardly pleasing and homoerotic aesthetic. Author Molly Tanzer's novelette "The Infernal History of the Ivybridge Twins" expanded upon Gloon's cult and mythology.

== I ==
=== Iod ===
Iod (The Hunter of Souls, The Shining Hunter) is a malevolent deity that reaps human souls.

It is said to have an appearance that is part-animal, part-plant, and part-mineral—with enormous compound eyes and rope-like tentacles; its body is covered in scales, emits a strong pulsating light, and drips mucus.

It is said to usually lurk in another dimension, reveling in the hunt for human souls, but it is also said that, depending on the method used, it can be safely summoned.

Those who are hunted have the life force drained from their bodies, but their brains remain alive and continue to function, leaving them in a state where their consciousness is trapped within their own corpses.

=== Ithaqua ===
Ithaqua (Wind-Walker, God of the Winds) is an air-elemental deity created by August Derleth who serves Hastur. It has a colossal body with human-like contours, a face that resembles a caricature of a human, two eyes that burn a vivid red, and webbed feet.

It is known as the “Wendigo,” a spirit said to roam forested areas on icy, snowy nights among Canada’s Indigenous peoples, appearing at lightning speed on the wind to carry humans away. Humans unlucky enough to encounter the Wendigo are swept up into the sky by it and, without dying as sacrifices, are dragged across distant, extraterrestrial lands for months on end.

== K ==
=== Kassogtha ===
Kassogtha (The Coiled One) is Cthulhu's sister and third wife. She is the mother of Nctosa and Nctolhu, and is also said to have given birth to Ult.

This goddess is also a parasitic entity; by fusing or uniting with other significant beings for a certain period, she is able to produce their offspring. When not doing so, she dwells in vast bodies of water, poisoning the water, bringing disease to the surrounding area, and causing living creatures to decay and mutate.

== M ==
=== Mnomquah ===
Mnomquah (The Monster in the Moon) is a god who is live in Dreamlands' moon. He mentioned in the book "Mad Moon of Dreams" (1987) by Brian Lumley. He is the husband of the Oorn.

Mnomquah is a great reptilian god, and he has granted the moonlight the power to heighten human madness; he possesses the ability to manipulate the moon’s orbit, moving it slowly but precisely as he pleases. He had planned to crash the moon of Dreamlands into Earth’s Dreamlands thereby devastating it.

Bokrug, a Great Old One or Lesser Old One, serves Mnomquah.

=== Mordiggian ===
Mordiggian (The Charnel God) is a god who guards the “Zul-Bha-Sair” cemetery in Zothique. It is said that a ghoul priest, clad in a purple robe and wearing a skull mask, serves at his side.

It is a cylindrical, caterpillar-like, black, opaque mass of darkness, yet for some reason emits a brilliance so intense that one cannot keep one’s eyes open. It can also take the form of a giant without eyes or limbs. However, since this form changes rapidly before one’s eyes, it does not actually possess a fixed shape.

For the ghouls, Mordiggian is a symbol of death; therefore, in Dreamlands, elderly ghouls fear this god and offer the corpses of their fellow ghouls to appease and console him. Furthermore, in Zul-Bha-Sair, it is said that they appease him by offering up all the dead.

Since Mordiggian is the god of death, he asserts his rights over the dead as his share. The act of resurrecting the dead is considered the greatest taboo in the worship of Mordiggian; anyone who attempts such a thing will be brutally slaughtered by Mordiggian himself or his worshippers.

== N ==
=== Nug and Yeb ===
Nug and Yeb (Twin Blasphemies) are the spawn of Shub-Niggurath and Yog-Sothoth. Nug is the parent of Cthulhu, and Yeb is the parent of Tsathoggua. They are worshipped in K'n-yan and Irem. They have putrid masses formed of vaporous gases and solid matter bodies, and they have spawned many monsters and several deities. Both Nug and Yeb closely resemble Shub-Niggurath.

Lin Carter considered them Lesser Old Ones. In his setting, Nug is the leader of the Ghouls who serve Nyogtha, and Yeb is the leader of the Unclean Ones who serve abhoth or the leader of the Dark Ones who serve Ghatanothoa.
However, this setting contradicts the commonly accepted setting for Nug and Yeb. For this reason, Nug and Yeb in the Lin Carter setting are generally considered to be different entities sharing the same name (in fact, the Nug of the "Father of Ghouls" was renamed Naggoob in later work).

The names Nug and Yeb are similar to the names of the Egyptian sibling gods Nut and Geb, members of the Heliopolitan Ennead.

=== Nyogtha ===
Nyogtha (The Thing That Should Not Be) appears in Henry Kuttner's short story "The Salem Horror" (1937). According to the story, the Necronomicon refers to Nyogtha as "the Dweller in Darkness"—an epithet used by August Derleth in the story of the same name to refer to Nyarlathotep; thus, it possibly that Nyogtha is yet another of Nyarlathotep's nigh-endless avatars. However, it is generally thought that the two are distinct entities, and that Nyogtha is also thought to be a descendant of Ubbo-Sathla.

Nyogtha appears as a amorphous mass composed of an unidentifiable sticky black substance. It is capable of extruding tentacles from this mass to manipulate the environment around it.

In his short story "Path of Corruption," Steve Berman has a group of New Orleans-based hustlers worshipping Nyogtha.

In the 1965 horror film Dark Intruder Nyogtha is mentioned towards the end as part of an invocation uttered by Professor Malaki to various demons, along with Goetic demons such as Astaroth and Asmodeus.

== O ==
=== Oorn ===
Oorn is mentioned in the book Mad Moon of Dreams (1987) by Brian Lumley. She is the wife of the reptilian Mnomquah. She has the form of a huge tentacled mollusk, with snaking appendages that can spew digestive fluid on things she wishes to eat. Like her husband, her only true worshippers are the Men of Leng and the Moon-beasts. A temple devoted to Oorn and Mnomquah is near Sarkomand in the Dreamlands.

== Q ==
=== Quachil Uttaus ===
Quachil Uttaus (The Treader of the Dust) can reduce all living tissue he comes into contact with to dust (and is therefore similar to another of Smith's characters, Ubbo-Sathla). Quachil Uttaus is usually associated with age, death, and decay. Summoning this god is considered lethal, if one even subconsciously entertains thoughts of suicide.

This deity can manipulate space-time, advancing or rewinding the flow of time, moving matter, and altering the structure of space; it is even capable of creating and destroying matter (which is why it is sometimes considered an embodiment of one aspect of Azathoth or Yog-Sothoth). It currently dwells in a limbo beyond space-time, but if it were unleashed into reality without restriction, it would cause many stars to burn out and reduce all things to ashes and dust.

== R ==
=== Rlim Shaikorth ===
Rlim Shaikorth appears as a huge whitish worm with a gaping maw, and eyes made of dripping globules of blood. One of Rlim Shaikorth's avatars is known as the White Worm and is part of Smith's Hyperborean cycle.

The White Worm travels on a gigantic iceberg called Yikilth, which it can guide across the ocean. In its colossal ice-citadel, the White Worm prowls the seas, blasting ships and inhabited land masses with extreme cold. Victims of the White Worm are frozen solid, their bodies appearing eerily white, and remain preternaturally cold—they will not melt nor warm even when exposed to fire. (The Coming of the White Worm, 1941)

Occasionally, Rlim Shaikorth is regarded as a Lesser Old One (serves Aphoom-Zhah).

=== Rhan-Tegoth ===
A weakened, amphibious, chimaera-like being that crushed its victims and sucked their blood. Revived and worshipped by the mad wax artist George Rogers.

Rhan-Tegoth (Terror of the Hominids) is an entity shaped somewhat like an enormous insect, with a tremendous, barrel-shaped trunk with six appendages ending in claw-like pincers and a near-spherical head covered with hair-like filaments or feelers, a tentacle-like proboscis, and three small, beady eyes. Despite being a deity of comparatively little power, it is vital for the return of the Old Ones. It lived in the warm seas of Yuggoth before coming to Earth.

== S ==
=== Shudde M'ell ===
Shudde M'ell (The Burrower Beneath) is a creation of Brian Lumley, featured in his novel The Burrowers Beneath (1974). It is "a great gray thing, a mile long, chanting and exuding strange acids... charging through the depths of the earth at a fantastic speed, in a dreadful fury... melting basaltic rocks like butter under a blowtorch." Shudde M'ell is the supreme regent of the chthonians, a horrifying race of burrowing creatures, and is probably the largest and most malignant member of his kind. According to some legends, he was once imprisoned beneath G'harne, but is now free to wander the earth with his kin.

=== Summanus ===
Summanus (Lord of Hell, Monarch of the Night, The Terror that Walketh in Darkness) is the creation of Brian Lumley — who based the Great Old One on the Roman deity of the same name — and first appeared in Lumley's short story "What Dark God?" (1975). The god appears as a mouthless human with whitish tentacles hidden under his clothing. He can use these tentacles to siphon blood from his victims.

Summanus had a following in Roman times, but if he is worshiped today, his cult is even more secretive. The rites needed for the proper worship of Summanus are found in the Tuscan Rituals.

== U ==
=== The Unimaginable Horror ===
The Unimaginable Horror (Oroarchan) appears in CT Phipps' Cthulhu Armageddon (2016) sequel The Tower of Zhaal (2017). It is a mammoth version of the creature from The Colour Out of Space that destroyed the Kastro'vaal civilization. It proceeded to arrive on Earth in primordial times before it was imprisoned in the oceans by Cthulhu's people. From there, it escaped and destroyed much of the Yitian civilization before being imprisoned again by a member of their race called Zhaal. The creature would remain imprisoned well after the rest of the Great Old Ones had arisen and only briefly escape before being restored to its imprisonment. It is written about in a book called The Unimaginable Horror that reveals details about the Tower of Zhaal and its origins.

=== Ut'Ulls-Hr'Her ===
Ut'Ulls-Hr'Her (The Great Horned Mother) is a goddess who appears in Joseph S. Pulver's novel, Nightmare's Disciple. She is believed to have been born of Yig and Shub-Niggurath, though some theories suggest she possibly an avatar of Shub-Niggurath.

She appears as a gigantic, faceless creature with various appendages sprouting from her head, including a beard of horns oozing sap, numerous reddish nipples, and fish-like fins extending from her egg-shaped body.

She is worshipped by an all-female cult, whose members sexually seduce men before flaying them and offering their skins to the goddess.

== V ==
=== Vulthoom ===
Vulthoom (The Sleeper of Ravermos) appears in the Clark Ashton Smith story of the same name, first published in the September 1935 issue of Weird Tales. The being is also known as Gsarthotegga.

In the story, Vulthoom is the Martian Aihai's equivalent of Satan. Though most rational people believe him to be a myth, he is nonetheless greatly feared by the lower class. In truth he is a mysterious being, from another universe, exiled by his fellow inhabitants, and lying in wait on Mars in the underground city of Ravormos. He took over Mars in ages past and plans to conquer Earth as his next trophy. Because of his vast intellect, and advanced technology, he seems godlike, but is in reality merely a very powerful alien who must rest for millennia at a time. While under the influence of the hallucinogenic perfume of an alien blossom, one man envisioned Vulthoom as a gigantic otherworldly plant, but the being's true form is unknown.

The DC Comics character Power Ring is associated with an entity named Volthoom. An entity sharing this name, who may or may not be the same Volthoom, appears as a major villain in Geoff Johns' Green Lantern stories.

== W ==
=== The Worm that Gnaws in the Night ===
The Worm that Gnaws in the Night (the Doom of Shaggai) appears in Lin Carter's short story "Shaggai" (1971). The being is portrayed as an enormous, worm-like entity. It was first observed by the wizard Eibon, who chanced upon it on a journey to the planet of Shaggai. To his amazement, Eibon discovered that the massive worm was the "Dweller in the Pyramid" mentioned by the demon Pharol, when questioned by Eibon (about a cryptic passage in the Pnakotic Manuscripts), and that once the Shan of Shaggai made the mistake of summoning it, they could not control or even send it back. Even the Elder Gods could not deal with it. The worm, to Eibon's horror, was slowly eating away at the vitals of Shaggai and he subsequently made a hasty return to Earth. Shaggai, however, eventually suffered a different fate from something that crawled over the edge of the universe, as related in Campbell's "The Insects from Shaggai".

== Y ==
=== Y'golonac ===
Y'golonac (The Defiler) appeared in the short story "Cold Print" written by Ramsey Campbell. He is the god of perversion and depravity – not just "average" human perversions or depravities, but any that can be conceived of by a sapient being. When he possesses a human host to manifest, he appears as a grotesquely obese man, lacking a head or neck, with a mouth in the palm of each hand. Whenever someone reads "Revelations of Gla'aki" or the name of Y'golonac is invoked or made public, he appears in search of worshippers and victims, manifesting by taking possession of a wicked individual's body and soul.

=== Yibb-Tstll ===
Yibb-Tstll (The Drowner) is an obscure god, said to watch at the center of all time as the universe revolves. Because of this insight, only Yog-Sothoth is said to be wiser. Its blood, the Black, is a weapon which takes the form of black snowflakes that stick to and smother a victim. This is stated in The Caller of the Black. The god's touch causes an instant change in the person affected—this change is usually fatal but occasionally brings some benefit.

Yibb-Tstll is sometimes described as an immobile, dark, tentacled entity with a pulpy, alien head, detached eyes, and large bat wings under which countless Nightgaunts suck black milk from its innumerable breasts. In Brian Lumley's short story "Rising with Surtsey" (1971), the narrator proclaims: "... I wanted to bound, to float in my madness through eldritch depths of unhallowed black blood. I wanted to cling to the writhing breasts of Yibb-Tstll. Insane...". Yibb-Tstll makes its major appearance in The Horror at Oakdeene.

Having a close connection to the Great Old One Bugg-Shash, some scholars suggest that Yibb-Tstll should be regarded as a Great Old One—specifically in the Drowners group introduced by Brian Lumley, parasitic alien entities which thrive by vampirizing the Great Old Ones themselves – though in RPG materials she is classed as "Outer God". This is explained by the fact that she perceives all time and space and appears to have some connection to Yog-Sothoth. However, later sources explain that there are various theories regarding whether she should be classified as an Outer God, or a Great Old One, or a Unique Entity.

=== Yig ===
Yig (the Father of Serpents) first appeared in the story The Curse of Yig which was created by Zealia Bishop and almost completely rewritten by H. P. Lovecraft. He is a deity that appears as a serpent man, serpent with bat like wings, or as a giant snake. Although Yig is easy to anger, he is easy to please as well. Yig often sends his serpent minions, the children of Yig, to destroy or transform his enemies. He is associated with the Serpent Men.

To Native Americans, Yig is regarded as "bad medicine". He is also alluded to in Western American folklore. He is considered a dark prototype of the Mesoamerican deity Quetzalcoatl and Kukulkan, and may be a dark prototype for that god and other serpentine gods worldwide. Furthermore, Yig occasionally bestows blessings upon the faithful, and because of these factors, he is sometimes considered to be one of the less malevolent of the Great Old Ones.

Some authors identify him as the Stygian serpent god Set's father, and from Robert E. Howard's Conan stories, and also with the Great Serpent worshiped by the Serpent People of Valusia from Howard's Kull stories.

Yig is the subject of a song by the shock rock band Gwar entitled "Horror of Yig", which appears on their album Scumdogs of the Universe. The band The Darkest of the Hillside Thickets, famous for their Lovecraft references, also refers to Yig in a song titled "Yig Snake Daddy".

Yig is the name of a deity in the Arcanis Dungeons & Dragons campaign setting. Yig was once (and may still be) worshipped by the Ssethregorean Empire, a group dominated by various lizard and snake-like beings. Yig in this mythos is a female deity, but still strongly associated with serpents, suggesting the name is not a coincidence.

Despite being spoken of on only a few occasions in Lovecraft's work, Yig is one of the Ancient Ones included in the Arkham Horror boardgame, appearing alongside Ancients such as Cthulhu and Nyarlathotep, proving his popularity.

== Z ==
=== Zathog ===
Zathog (The Black Lord of Whirling Vortices) appears in Richard Tierney's novel The Winds of Zarr (1971), as well as in his short story "From Beyond the Stars" (1975). After warring with the Elder Gods, Zathog, eager for revenge, entered into a compact with the brutal Zarr. The Zarr controlled most of the galaxy where they dwelt, and desired to conquer the rest of the universe. In return for helping him free his brethren, Zathog promised to give the Zarr the ability to travel through time and space.

=== Zushakon ===
Zushakon (or Zuchequon or Zul-Che-Quon) debuted in Henry Kuttner's short story "Bells of Horror" (1939). The being is the son of Ubbo-Sathla, procreated by binary fission. Other sources, however, consider him the progeny of Shub-Niggurath and Hastur.

Zushakon is the god of death to the Mutsun tribe of California. Zushakon has an intense hatred of light and will slay anyone who exposes one of his sacred artifacts to it. He can be summoned by the ringing of three specially consecrated bells. His arrival is heralded by the rapid darkening and chilling of the surrounding environment and the sound of flapping, as if produced by very large wings, steadily increasing in volume. Furthermore, all creatures nearby suffer an irritation of the eyes that is so severe, they are compelled to literally gouge them out. Upon his arrival, the surrounding shadows darken, thicken, swirl, and finally clot into his dreadful shape. It is not known whether the clot of darkness that forms is merely a gateway or the actual entity himself.

According to the famed occult detective Doctor Anton Zarnak, who witnessed Zushakon's arrival during an unsuccessful attempt to exorcise him from a client, Zushakon is an earth elemental, and can be repelled by bright lights or by summoning the fire god Cthugha. The victim, who died during the struggle, had dug up a mound that contained the remains of a Mutsun shaman. Inside, he found an obsidian tablet and a carving of a hooded, possibly winged, humanoid figure surrounded by toad-like beings prostrate in worship before it. Inscribed on the tablet was an ancient, now-extinct script promising death to anyone who exposed the contents of the barrow. It is likely that the winged figure in the carving is Zushakon himself.

After he departs, Zushakon may return yet again during the first earthquake or solar eclipse following an earlier, successful summoning of him.

== See also ==
- List of Cthulhu Mythos deities
- Hyperborean cycle
- Xothic legend cycle
- Family tree of Tsathoggua
