= The Early Long =

1975 collection of stories by Frank Belknap Long

- First edition
- Author: Frank Belknap Long
- Cover artist: Peter Rauch
- Language: English
- Genre: Science fiction Fantasy; Horror
- Publisher: Doubleday
- Publication date: 1975
- Publication place: United States
- Media type: Print (hardcover)
- ISBN: 978-0-385-05563-5
- OCLC: 001602053

The Early Long is a collection of stories by Frank Belknap Long. Released in 1975, more than 50 years after the start of Long's career, it contains some of Long's best stories, together with an introduction which casts light on his early life and work. Many of the stories had appeared in Weird Tales and other pulp magazines and had helped establish Long's reputation as one of the classic writers of the horror and science fiction genres in the early twentieth century. The book was one of a series of retrospective collections of early stories with autobiographical commentary by major sf and fantasy writers that Doubleday published in the 1970s, beginning with The Early Asimov (1972) and continuing with The Early del Rey (1975), The Early Williamson (1975), The Early Pohl (1975), and The Early Long.

The book has essentially the same story contents as the Arkham House edition of The Hounds of Tindalos (book), save that it omits four stories: "Bridgehead"; "A Stitch in Time"; "Golden Child" and "The Black Druid". It is not merely an abridged edition, however, since it includes a long autobiographical introduction by Long, and extensive story notes by the author on all 17 stories which did not appear in the Arkham House volume.

In the introduction, Long discusses his indebtedness to greats such as H. G. Wells, Poe, Hawthorne, H.P. Lovecraft, Isaac Asimov, Ray Bradbury, Theodore Sturgeon and Robert Bloch. Long also wrote a brief intro to each of the stories.

A British edition was published by Robert Hale in 1976. An American paperback edition was published by Jove Books in 1978, under the title The Hounds of Tindalos. (The same title was used for Long's 1946 Arkham House collection; all of the stories in this volume also appeared in the earlier book.)

The Early Long was nominated for a World Fantasy Award for best collection in 1976.

== Contents ==
The Early Long contains the following:

1. "Introduction"
2. "A Visitor from Egypt"
3. "Dark Vision"
4. "Death-Waters"
5. "Fisherman's Luck"
6. "Grab Bags Are Dangerous"
7. "It Will Come to You"
8. "Second Night Out"
9. "Step Into My Garden"
10. "The Census Taker"
11. "The Dark Beasts"
12. "The Elemental"
13. "The Flame Midget"
14. "The Hounds of Tindalos"
15. "The Ocean Leech"
16. "The Peeper"
17. "The Refugees"
18. "The Space-Eaters"
