= In Mayan Splendor =

1977 collection of poems by Frank Belknap Long

- Jacket illustration by Stephen E. Fabian for In Mayan Splendor
- Author: Frank Belknap Long
- Illustrator: Stephen E. Fabian
- Cover artist: Stephen E. Fabian
- Language: English
- Genre: poetry
- Publisher: Arkham House
- Publication date: 1977
- Publication place: United States
- Media type: Print (Hardback)
- Pages: x, 66 pp
- ISBN: 0-87054-080-7
- OCLC: 3589038
- Dewey Decimal: 811/.5/2
- LC Class: PS3523.O465 I5

In Mayan Splendor is a collection of poems by Frank Belknap Long. It was released in 1977 by Arkham House in an edition of 2,947 copies. The book is illustrated by Stephen E. Fabian and contains the complete contents of Long's earlier verse collections, A Man from Genoa (1926) and The Goblin Tower (1935) plus additional poems.

== Contents ==
In Mayan Splendor contains the following poems:

1. "In Mayan Splendor"
2. "A Knight of La Mancha"
3. "Sonnet"
4. "A Man from Genoa"
5. "Advice"
6. "Pirate-Men"
7. "On Icy Kinarth"
8. "The Magi"
9. "On Reading Arthur Machen"
10. "Stallions of the Moon"
11. "In Hospital"
12. "Ballad of St. Anthony"
13. "The White People"
14. "An Old Tale Retold"
15. "Prediction"
16. "The Rebel"
17. "Two Stanzas for Master François Villon"
18. "The Goblin Tower"
19. "West Indies"
20. "The Hashish-Eater"
21. "When We Have Seen"
22. "The Marriage of Sir John de Mandeville"
23. "Manhattan Skyline & W.W."
24. "The Horror on Dagoth Wold"
25. "In the Garden of Eros"
26. "The Prophet"
27. "Night-Trees"
28. "Florence"
29. "When Chaugnar Wakes"
30. "In Antique Mood"
31. "The Abominable Snow Men"
32. "A Sonnet for Seamen"
33. "Ballad of Mary Magdalene"
34. "Great Ashtoreth"
35. "Subway"
36. "An Old Wife Speaketh It"
37. "A Time Will Come"
38. "The Inland Sea"
39. "Exotic Quest"
40. "H.P. Lovecraft"
