= The Rim of the Unknown =

1972 collection of stories by Frank Belknap Long

- Dust-jacket illustration by Herb Arnold for The Rim of the Unknown
- Author: Frank Belknap Long
- Cover artist: Herb Arnold
- Language: English
- Genre: Fantasy, horror, science fiction
- Publisher: Arkham House
- Publication date: 1972
- Publication place: United States
- Media type: Print (hardback)
- Pages: 291

The Rim of the Unknown is a collection of 23 stories by American writer Frank Belknap Long. It was published by Arkham House in 1972 with cover art by Herb Arnold and was the author's second collection of stories published by Arkham House. It was published in an edition of 3,650 copies.

The collection focusses primarily on Long's science fiction work in short form. While there is one tale ("The Man with a Thousand Legs") which appeared in Weird Tales, the other stories are reprinted from such sources as Science Fiction Plus, Thrilling Wonder Stories, Startling Stories, Astounding Science Fiction, and Fantastic Universe.

The rear flap of the book credits Long with having written various other works including the fugitive The Mystery of the Golden Butterfly. The latter appears to have been an Ellery Queen novel which remained unpublished, although it is known that Long was the author of two other Queen novels - The Golden Eagle Mystery (1942) and The Green Turtle Mystery (1944).

== Contents ==
The Rim of the Unknown contains the following stories:

1. "The Spiral Intelligence"
2. "The World of Wulkins"
3. "The Man With a Thousand Legs"
4. "Humpty Dumpty Had a Great Fall"
5. "Guest in the House"
6. "The Trap"
7. "Fuzzy Head"
8. "The House of Rising Winds"
9. "Mr. Caxton Draws a Martian Bird"
10. "The Critters"
11. "The Cottage"
12. "The Man from Time"
13. "Cones"
14. "Preview"
15. "Lesson in Survival"
16. "Good to be a Martian"
17. "Filch"
18. "Little Men of Space"
19. "The Spectacles"
20. "Man of Distinction"
21. "The Great Cold"
22. "Green Glory"
23. "The Last Men"

== Sources ==
- Jaffery, Sheldon (1989). The Arkham House Companion. Mercer Island, WA: Starmont House, Inc. p. 103. ISBN 1-55742-005-X.
- Chalker, Jack L.; Mark Owings (1998). The Science-Fantasy Publishers: A Bibliographic History, 1923-1998. Westminster, MD and Baltimore: Mirage Press, Ltd. p. 50.
- Joshi, S.T. (1999). Sixty Years of Arkham House: A History and Bibliography. Sauk City, WI: Arkham House. p. 129. ISBN 0-87054-176-5.
- Nielsen, Leon (2004). Arkham House Books: A Collector's Guide. Jefferson, NC and London: McFarland & Company, Inc. p. 116. ISBN 0-7864-1785-4.
