= The Horror from the Hills =

1963 novel by Frank Belknap Long

- Dust-jacket Illustration by Richard Taylor for The Horror from the Hills
- Author: Frank Belknap Long
- Cover artist: Richard Taylor
- Language: English
- Genre: Horror
- Publisher: Arkham House
- Publication date: 1963
- Publication place: United States
- Media type: Print (Hardback)
- Pages: 110

The Horror from the Hills is a horror novel by American writer Frank Belknap Long. It was published by Arkham House in 1963 in an edition of 1,997 copies. The novel is part of the Cthulhu Mythos. There are two states of the Arkham House edition. The copyright notice was omitted from the copyright page by the printer. Copies lacking the copyright notice comprise the scarcer state. In some copies the copyright notice appears as a small pasted-in addition (second state), a change made after some copies without the notice had been placed in circulation.

The novel was originally serialized in two parts in Weird Tales magazine, appearing in the January and February–March, 1931 issues. Long also incorporated a dream of H. P. Lovecraft into the novel, using Lovecraft's description nearly verbatim and with his permission.

== Plot summary ==
The novel concerns the elephantine Great Old One Chaugnar Faugn. Algernon Harris was the curator of Archaeology at the Manhattan Museum of Fine Arts. He sent his field workers to the most primitive and dangerous parts of the world for artifacts. Not all came back unscathed, and two returned inexplicably mutilated. A third, Clark Ulman, returned with a stone idol, of hideous appearance, and with his face concealed with a scarf.

The idol resembled an elephant more than anything else. The pedestal was also of an ugly unidentifiable stone. Richardson had spoken of it in an account of the tortures he endured at the hands of its subhuman worshippers. Ulman was made to take the idol back to civilization to fulfill an ancient prophecy. Ulman also said that Chaugnar Faugn was not just an idol, but the god himself and that he attacked Ulman in the night, and fed on his blood.

Chaugnar Faugn's high priest and spokesman explained to Ulman that Chaugnar - and his five brothers- once lived in an inaccessible cave in the Pyrenees, served by humanoids that Chaugnar created, the Miri Nigri. They received human sacrifices from the people of Pompelo -until the Romans wiped them out. Chaugnar Faugn and his brothers then destroyed Pompelo and the former then moved to Asia to await the "white acolyte": Ulman.

Ulman was bidden to convey the idol to civilization and warned that Chaugnar had put a "sacrament" on him that, if he made to destroy or dispose of the idol, he would rot away in moments. Ulman rambled on about theories of alien life prior to the organic life that now inhabits earth, and to convince Algernon to unveil his mutilated face. In the midst of arguing about whether his now inhuman face was the work of Chaugnar Faugn or that of an acolyte, Ulman collapsed and died.

Ulman's face now had an elephantine trunk and huge ears, hardly explainable by disease or plastic surgery, and his body was already beginning to decay. After the inquest, the idol was put on display in the museum.

Algernon and museum president Scollard very soon afterwards had to investigate the murder of Mr. Cinney, a guard. The man had been found, drained of blood, his face mutilated beyond recognition, and the idol's proboscis was dripping with blood. They also interviewed a Chinese laundry boss who was guided by a dream to come to the museum and be eaten by Chaugnar. When they examined the idol, they found that the trunk had moved since yesterday.

After some discussion, they consult a certain Roger Little. At the same time papers reported a massacre in the Pyrenees, with gigantic footprints ranged around the 14 dead, headless peasants.

Roger Little was formerly a criminal investigator and now a mystic recluse who had even seen Cthulhu Mythos phenomena. He also relates a dream about Pompelo's destruction (the text here is taken almost verbatim from a November 3,1927 letter by Lovecraft to Donald Wandrei relating one of his dreams).

The trio now get a phone call from the museum that Chaugnar Faugn had left the museum, and is now roaming the streets of Manhattan. It was then that Roger Little, seeing the time has come to act, reveals his anti-entropy ray. The machine is indescribably complex and so are its motions when switched on. Algernon swore he saw a face appear in the whirling parts, just before a ray shot out and bathed the wall. Little shuts the ray off before the wall would have dissolved into its original components.

Little explains that the ray reverses entropy, sends anything it hits "back through time" and he hopes that Chaugnar, bathed in the ray, will return to its original form and go back to where he came from, before entropy over earth's eons shaped him the way he is now. The machine is portable and so they intend to pursue Chaugnar.

Chaugnar Faugn had attacked and mangled five people. Imbert thinks the machine is just an hypnotizer, and Algernon plays the ray on the wall until it dissolves to convince him otherwise. Apologizing to Little for damaging his apartment, the three set out to stop Chaugnar's rampage.

Police reports of murders guide the trio to where Chaugnar Faugn had gone, to the New Jersey sea-coast. Chaugnar would have stood his ground and attacked them, but the ray proved painful and forced him to turn and run. A bathhouse, a turtle and sea shells vanished in the ray, and Chaugnar's geological ancientness alone enabled it to survive. They figure it would take 10–15 minutes for the ray to do its work on him.

Chaugnar is unable to move fast enough, when his feet get caught in the shore mire, and the ray is played on him and the three endure its awful bellowing. Before their eyes, Chaugnar de-evolves and slowly, horribly disincarnates. Chaugnar, after many transformations, reverts to a mantle of glowing slime, and finally fades away. Chaugnar, now an expanding force in the sky, reappears and tries to grab the three who hurt it so, but then vanishes. The dawn comes.

At the same time, Chaugnar's five brothers also have vanished in the Pyrenees before they could do any further havoc, leaving but five pools of black slime. This meant that Chaugnar and his brothers were actually connected hyper-dimensionally. Though Chaugnar is now gone, Little ponders the possibility that he may someday, after ages, return to ravage again.

== Sources ==
- Jaffery, Sheldon; Fred Cook (1985). The Collector's Index to Weird Tales. Bowling Green, OH: Bowling Green State University Popular Press. p. 33. ISBN 0-87972-284-3.
- Jaffery, Sheldon (1989). The Arkham House Companion. Mercer Island, WA: Starmont House, Inc. p. 69. ISBN 1-55742-005-X.
- Chalker, Jack L.; Mark Owings (1998). The Science-Fantasy Publishers: A Bibliographic History, 1923-1998. Westminster, MD and Baltimore: Mirage Press, Ltd. p. 39.
- Joshi, S.T. (1999). Sixty Years of Arkham House: A History and Bibliography. Sauk City, WI: Arkham House. p. 82. ISBN 0-87054-176-5.
- Nielsen, Leon (2004). Arkham House Books: A Collector's Guide. Jefferson, NC and London: McFarland & Company, Inc. p. 89. ISBN 0-7864-1785-4.
