= Hounds of Tindalos =

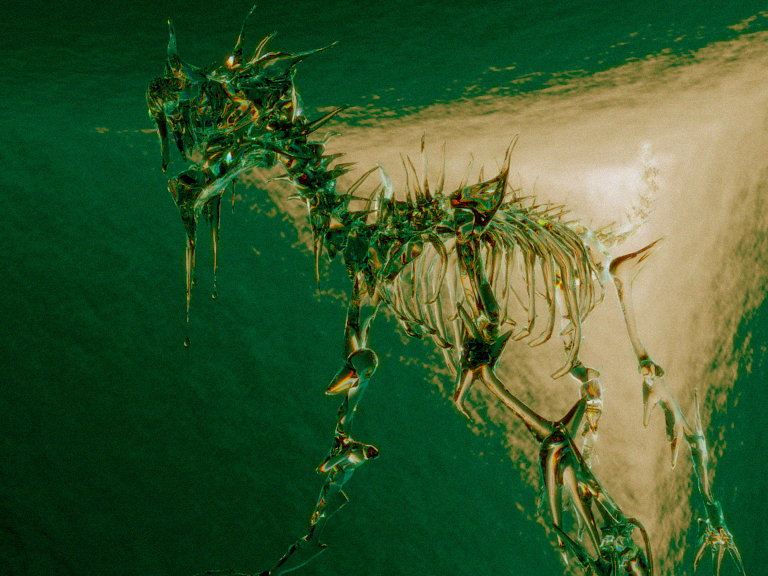
- Artist's impression of one of the Hounds of Tindalos
- First appearance: "The Hounds of Tindalos"
- Created by: Frank Belknap Long

In-universe information
- Species: Pseudocanis tindalosi
- Type: Extraterrestrial life form

The Hounds of Tindalos are fictional creatures created by Frank Belknap Long and later incorporated into the Cthulhu Mythos when it was codified by August Derleth. They first appeared in Long's short story "The Hounds of Tindalos", first published in the March 1929 issue of Weird Tales. Lovecraft mentions the creatures in his short story "The Whisperer in Darkness" (1931).

== Description ==
In Frank Belknap Long's original story, which deals with the main character experimenting in time travel with the help of psychedelic drugs and esoteric artifacts, the Hounds are said to inhabit the angles of time, while other beings (such as humankind and all common life) descend from curves.

Though the Hounds are sometimes pictured as canine, probably because of the evocative name, their appearance is unknown, since neither Long nor Lovecraft describe them, arguing they are too foul to ever be described. Long's story states that their name "veils their foulness". It is said that they have long, hollow tongues or proboscises to drain victims' body-fluids, and that they excrete a strange blue pus or ichor. They can materialize through any corner if it is fairly sharp (120° or less). When a Hound is about to manifest, it materializes first as smoke pouring from the corner, and finally the head emerges followed by the body. It is said that once a human becomes known to one of these creatures, a Hound of Tindalos will pursue the victim through anything to reach its quarry. A person risks attracting their attention by traveling through time.
