= Out of Space and Time =

Book by Clark Ashton Smith

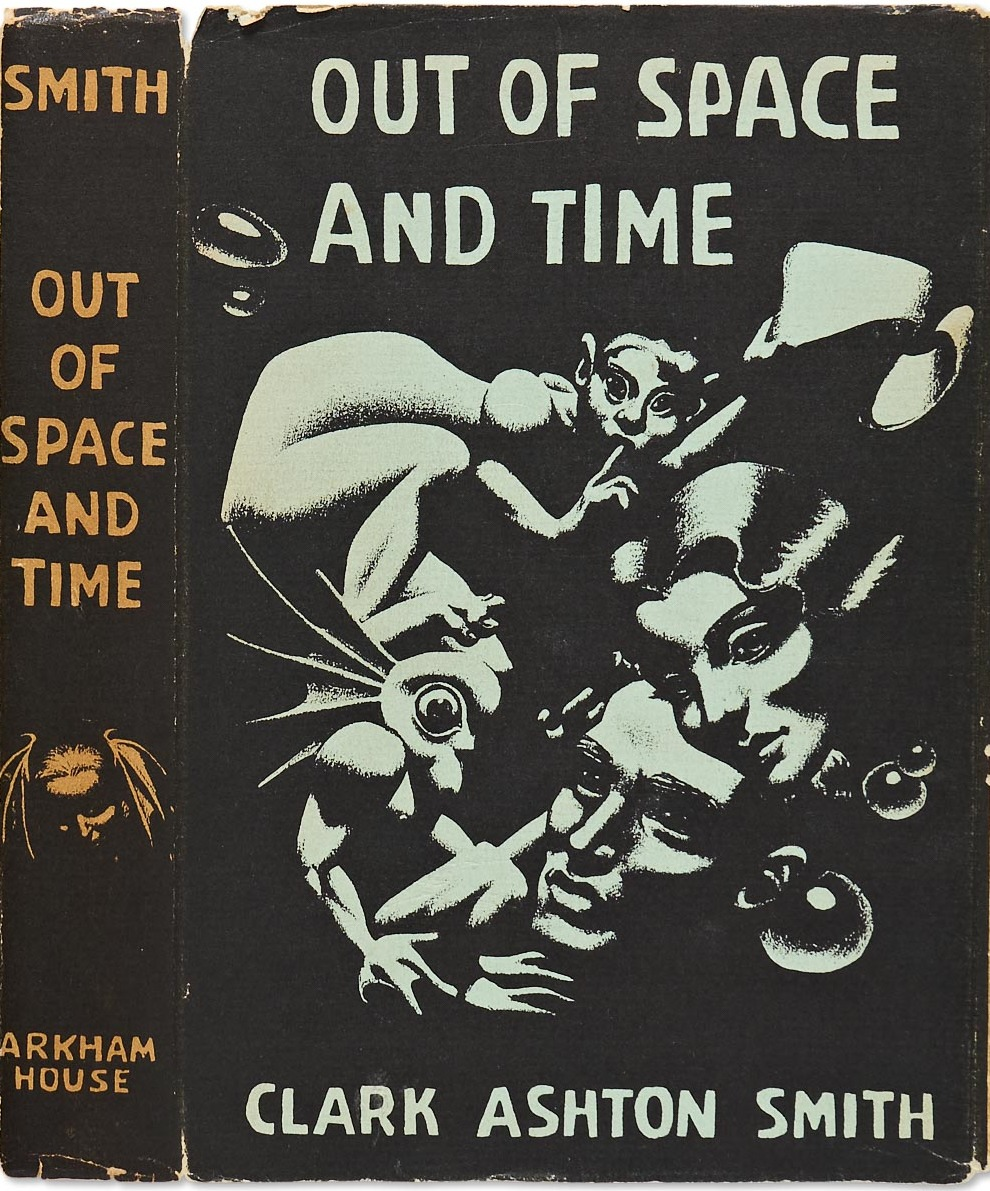
- Dust-jacket illustration by Hannes Bok.
- Author: Clark Ashton Smith
- Cover artist: Hannes Bok
- Language: English
- Genre: Fantasy, horror short stories
- Publisher: Arkham House
- Publication date: 1942
- Publication place: United States
- Media type: Print (hardback)
- Pages: xii, 370

Out of Space and Time is a collection of fantasy and horror short stories by American writer Clark Ashton Smith. It was released in 1942 and was the third book published by Arkham House. 1,054 copies were printed. A British hardcover appeared from Neville Spearman in 1971, with a two-volume paperback reprint following from Panther Books in 1974. Bison Books issued a trade paperback edition in 2006.

The stories for this volume were selected by the author and were considered by him to be his best fantasy and horror stories to date. The collection contains stories from Smith's major story cycles of Averoigne, Hyperborea, Poseidonis, and Zothique. Smith had wanted to call the collection "The End of the Story and Other Stories", but acceded to Derleth's suggestion, an allusion to Edgar Allan Poe's "Dream-Land".

== Contents ==
Out of Space and Time contains the following tales:

- "Clark Ashton Smith: Master of Fantasy", by August Derleth & Donald Wandrei
- "The End of the Story"
- "A Rendezvous in Averoigne"
- "A Night in Malnéant"
- "The City of the Singing Flame"
- "The Uncharted Isle"
- "The Second Interment"
- "The Double Shadow"
- "The Chain of Aforgomon"
- "The Dark Eidolon"
- "The Last Hieroglyph"
- "Sadastor"
- "The Death of Ilalotha"
- "The Return of the Sorcerer"
- "The Testament of Athammaus"
- "The Weird of Avoosl Wuthoqquan"
- "Ubbo-Sathla"
- "The Monster of Prophecy"
- "The Vaults of Yoh-Vombis"
- "From the Crypts of Memory"
- "The Shadows"

== Reprints ==
- Jersey, UK: Neville Spearman, 1971.
- St. Albans, UK: Panther, 1974 (2 vols.).
- Lincoln, NE: Bison, 2006.

== Reception ==
Writing in Unknown Worlds, Anthony Boucher described the collection as "four hundred pages of magnificent reading", praising Smith as "a poet and a craftsman [who] has produced by far the best work in the Lovecraft tradition". New York Times reviewer Louise Maunsell Field noted that while most of Smith's stories were "overelaborated and far too wordy", the author had "an active, fertile imagination", concluding that the collection would please "[r]eaders who delight in fantasy and witchcraft".

== See also ==
- Clark Ashton Smith bibliography

== Sources ==
- Jaffery, Sheldon (1989). The Arkham House Companion. Mercer Island, WA: Starmont House, Inc. pp. 4–5. ISBN 1-55742-005-X.
- Chalker, Jack L.; Mark Owings (1998). The Science-Fantasy Publishers: A Bibliographic History, 1923-1998. Westminster, MD and Baltimore: Mirage Press, Ltd. p. 26.
- Nielsen, Leon (2004). Arkham House Books: A Collector's Guide. Jefferson, NC and London: McFarland & Company, Inc. pp. 48–49. ISBN 0-7864-1785-4.
