= Clark Ashton Smith bibliography =

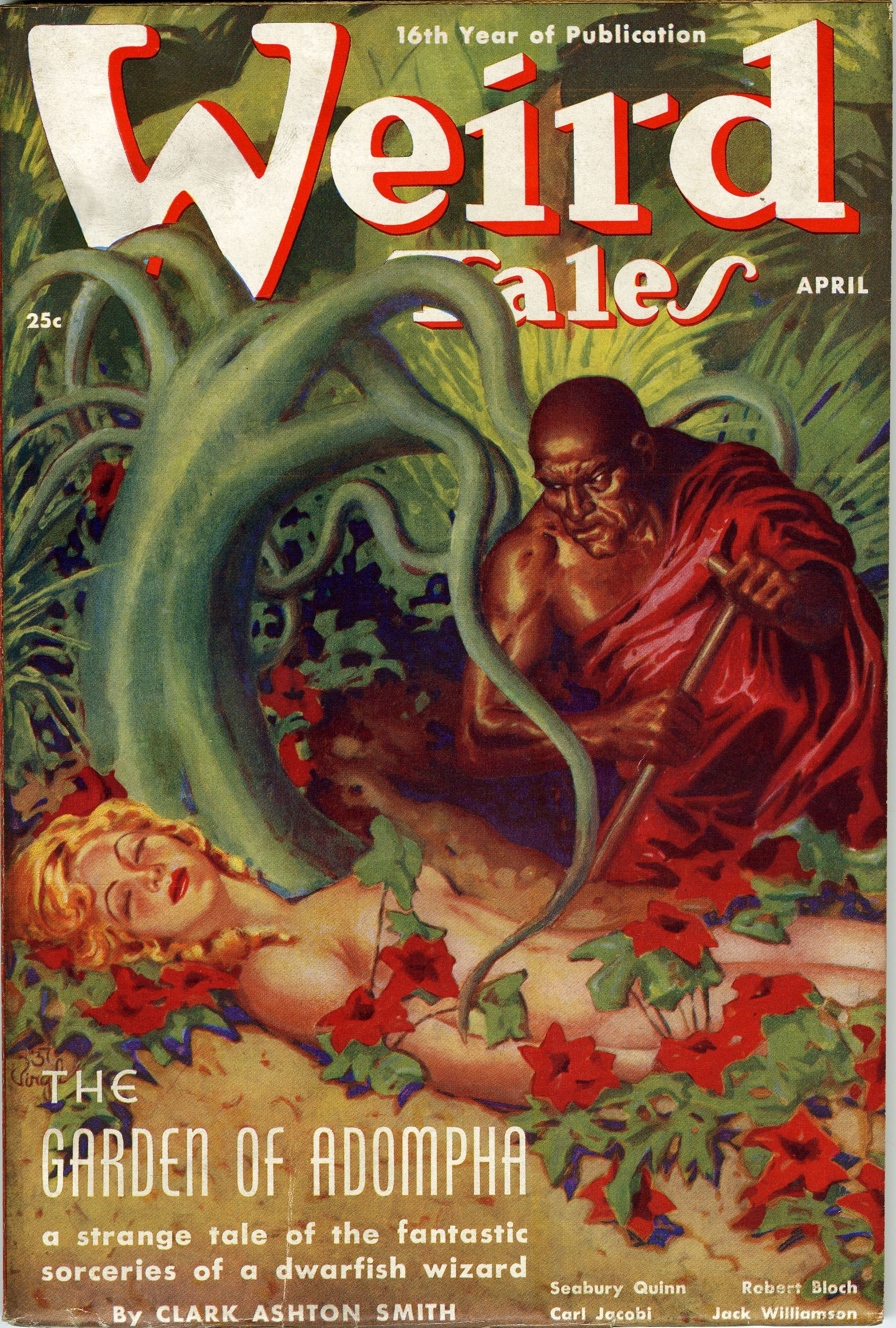
"The Garden of Adompha" was initially published in Weird Tales.

The following is a list of works by Clark Ashton Smith.

== Short fiction ==
Short fiction by Clark Ashton Smith
Title	Date published	1st published in	Anthologized in	Fictional setting	Notes	Online versions
The Abominations of Yondo	Apr 1926	Overland Monthly (Vol. 84, #4)	The Abominations of Yondo			
An Adventure in Futurity	Apr 1931	Wonder Stories	Other Dimensions			
The Amazing Planet	Summer 1931	Wonder Stories Quarterly (Summer)	Other Dimensions	The Alcyone	also titled "A Captivity in Serpens"	
The Beast of Averoigne	May 1933	Weird Tales	Lost Worlds	Averoigne		abridged version original published version
Beyond the Singing Flame	Nov 1931	Wonder Stories	The Collected Fantasies of Clark Ashton Smith: A Vintage from Atlantis		sequel to The City of the Singing Flame, later merged with it	
The Black Abbot of Puthuum	Mar 1936	Weird Tales	Genius Loci and Other Tales	Zothique		
The Chain of Aforgomon	Dec 1935	Weird Tales	Out of Space and Time			
The Charnel God	Mar 1934	Weird Tales	Genius Loci and Other Tales	Zothique		
Checkmate	1989	Strange Shadows: The Uncollected Fiction and Essays of Clark Ashton Smith	Strange Shadows: The Uncollected Fiction and Essays of Clark Ashton Smith		non-fantastic fiction, written in 1930	
The City of the Singing Flame	Jul 1931	Wonder Stories	Out of Space and Time			
The Colossus of Ylourgne	Jun 1934	Weird Tales	Genius Loci and Other Tales	Averoigne		
The Coming of the White Worm	Apr 1941	Stirring Science Stories	Lost Worlds	Hyperborea	written in 1933	abridged version
A Copy of Burns	1989	Strange Shadows: The Uncollected Fiction and Essays of Clark Ashton Smith	Strange Shadows: The Uncollected Fiction and Essays of Clark Ashton Smith		non-fantastic fiction, written in 1930	
The Dark Age	Apr 1938	Thrilling Wonder Stories	The Abominations of Yondo			
The Dark Eidolon	Jan 1935	Weird Tales	Out of Space and Time	Zothique		
The Dart of Rasasfa	Nov 1984	Untold Tales of Clark Ashton Smith (Crypt of Cthulhu, #27)	Strange Shadows: The Uncollected Fiction and Essays of Clark Ashton Smith		written in 1961	
The Death of Ilalotha	Sep 1937	Weird Tales	Out of Space and Time	Zothique		
The Death of Malygris	Apr 1934	Weird Tales	Lost Worlds	Poseidonis		
The Demon of the Flower	Dec 1933	Astounding Stories	Lost Worlds			
The Devotee of Evil	1933	The Double Shadow and Other Fantasies	The Abominations of Yondo			unpublished synopsis
The Dimension of Chance	Nov 1932	Wonder Stories	Other Dimensions			
The Disinterment of Venus	Jul 1934	Weird Tales	Genius Loci and Other Tales	Averoigne		unpublished synopsis
The Door to Saturn	Jan 1932	Strange Tales	Lost Worlds	Hyperborea		
Double Cosmos	1989	Strange Shadows: The Uncollected Fiction and Essays of Clark Ashton Smith	Strange Shadows: The Uncollected Fiction and Essays of Clark Ashton Smith		written in 1934-1940	
The Double Shadow	1933	The Double Shadow and Other Fantasies	Out of Space and Time	Poseidonis		unpublished synopsis
The Dweller in the Gulf	Mar 1933	Wonder Stories	The Abominations of Yondo	Aihai (Mars)		
The Empire of the Necromancers	Sep 1932	Weird Tales	Lost Worlds	Zothique		
The Enchantress of Sylaire	Jul 1941	Weird Tales	The Abominations of Yondo	Averoigne		
The End of the Story	May 1930	Weird Tales	Out of Space and Time	Averoigne		
The Epiphany of Death	Jul 1934	The Fantasy Fan	The Abominations of Yondo			
The Eternal World	Mar 1932	Wonder Stories	Genius Loci and Other Tales			
The Expert Lover	1989	Strange Shadows: The Uncollected Fiction and Essays of Clark Ashton Smith	Strange Shadows: The Uncollected Fiction and Essays of Clark Ashton Smith		non-fantastic fiction, written in 1925	
The Face by the River	Mar 2004	Lost Worlds: The Journal of Clark Ashton Smith Studies #1	The Collected Fantasies of Clark Ashton Smith: The Door To Saturn		written in 1930	
The Flirt	Mar 1923	Live Stories (Vol. 36)	Strange Shadows: The Uncollected Fiction and Essays of Clark Ashton Smith		non-fantastic fiction	
The Flower-Women	May 1935	Weird Tales	Lost Worlds	Xiccarph		
The Garden of Adompha	Apr 1938	Weird Tales	Genius Loci and Other Tales	Zothique		
Genius Loci	Jun 1933	Weird Tales	Genius Loci and Other Tales			
The Ghoul	Jan 1934	The Fantasy Fan	Other Dimensions			
A Good Embalmer	1989	Strange Shadows: The Uncollected Fiction and Essays of Clark Ashton Smith	Strange Shadows: The Uncollected Fiction and Essays of Clark Ashton Smith		written in 1931	
The Gorgon	Apr 1932	Weird Tales	Lost Worlds			
The Great God Awto	Feb 1940	Thrilling Wonder Stories	Tales of Science and Sorcery			
The Holiness of Azédarac	Nov 1933	Weird Tales	Lost Worlds	Averoigne		
The Hunters from Beyond	Oct 1932	Strange Tales	Lost Worlds			
The Ice-Demon	Apr 1933	Weird Tales	The Abominations of Yondo	Hyperborea		
The Immeasurable Horror	Sep 1931	Weird Tales	Other Dimensions			
The Immortals of Mercury	1932	Science Fiction Series (#16)	Tales of Science and Sorcery			
The Invisible City	Jun 1932	Wonder Stories	Other Dimensions			
The Isle of the Torturers	Mar 1933	Weird Tales	Lost Worlds	Zothique		
The Justice of the Elephant	Fall 1931	Oriental Stories (Fall)	Other Dimensions			
The Kiss of Zoraida	Jul 1933	The Magic Carpet	Other Dimensions			
The Last Hieroglyph	Apr 1935	Weird Tales	Out of Space and Time	Zothique		
The Last Incantation	Jun 1930	Weird Tales	Lost Worlds	Poseidonis		
The Letter from Mohaun Los	Aug 1932	Wonder Stories	Lost Worlds		also titled "Flight into Super-Time"	
The Light from Beyond	Apr 1933	Wonder Stories	Lost Worlds		also titled "The Secret of the Cairn"	
The Maker of Gargoyles	Aug 1932	Weird Tales	Tales of Science and Sorcery	Averoigne		
The Mandrakes	Feb 1933	Weird Tales	Other Dimensions	Averoigne		
Marooned in Andromeda	Oct 1930	Wonder Stories	Other Dimensions	The Alcyone		
Master of the Asteroid	Oct 1932	Wonder Stories	Tales of Science and Sorcery		also titled "The God of the Asteroid"	
The Master of the Crabs	Mar 1948	Weird Tales	The Abominations of Yondo	Zothique		
The Maze of the Enchanter	1933	The Double Shadow and Other Fantasies	Lost Worlds	Xiccarph	alternate version published in Weird Tales Oct 1938 as "The Maze of Maâl Dweb"	
The Metamorphosis of Earth	Sep 1951	Weird Tales	Other Dimensions		written in 1929	
The Monster of the Prophecy	Jan 1932	Weird Tales	Out of Space and Time		also titled "A Prophecy of Monsters"	
Monsters in the Night	Oct 1954	The Magazine of Fantasy and Science Fiction	Other Dimensions			
Morthylla	May 1953	Weird Tales	Tales of Science and Sorcery	Zothique		
Mother of Toads	Jul 1938	Weird Tales	Tales of Science and Sorcery	Averoigne		original published version
Murder in the Fourth Dimension	Oct 1930	Amazing Detective Tales	Tales of Science and Sorcery			
The Nameless Offspring	Summer 1932	The Magazine of Horror (#33)	The Abominations of Yondo			
Necromancy in Naat	Jul 1936	Weird Tales	Lost Worlds	Zothique		
The Necromantic Tale	Jan 1931	Weird Tales	Other Dimensions			
Nemesis of the Unfinished	Nov 1984	Untold Tales of Clark Ashton Smith (Crypt of Cthulhu, #27)	Strange Shadows: The Uncollected Fiction and Essays of Clark Ashton Smith		written in 1947	
A Night in Malnéant	1933	The Double Shadow and Other Fantasies	Out of Space and Time	Averoigne		
The Ninth Skeleton	Sep 1928	Weird Tales	Genius Loci and Other Tales			
An Offering to the Moon	Sep 1953	Weird Tales	Other Dimensions	Lemuria	written in 1930	
The Parrot	1989	Strange Shadows: The Uncollected Fiction and Essays of Clark Ashton Smith	Strange Shadows: The Uncollected Fiction and Essays of Clark Ashton Smith		non-fantastic fiction, written in 1930	
The Perfect Woman	1989	Strange Shadows: The Uncollected Fiction and Essays of Clark Ashton Smith	Strange Shadows: The Uncollected Fiction and Essays of Clark Ashton Smith		non-fantastic fiction, written in 1923	
The Phantoms of the Fire	Sep 1930	Weird Tales	Genius Loci and Other Tales			
Phoenix	1954	Time to Come (Farrar, Straus & Young)	Other Dimensions			
The Planet of the Dead	Mar 1932	Weird Tales	Lost Worlds		also titled "The Doom of Antarion"	
A Platonic Entanglement	1989	Strange Shadows: The Uncollected Fiction and Essays of Clark Ashton Smith	Strange Shadows: The Uncollected Fiction and Essays of Clark Ashton Smith		non-fantastic fiction, written in 1923	
The Plutonian Drug	Sep 1934	Amazing Stories	Lost Worlds			
The Primal City	Nov 1934	The Fantasy Fan	Genius Loci and Other Tales			
The Red World of Polaris	2003	Red World of Polaris	The Collected Fantasies of Clark Ashton Smith: The Door To Saturn	The Alcyone	written in 1930	
A Rendezvous in Averoigne	Apr/May 1931	Weird Tales	Out of Space and Time	Averoigne		
The Resurrection of the Rattlesnake	Oct 1931	Weird Tales	Other Dimensions			
The Return of the Sorcerer	Sep 1931	Strange Tales	Out of Space and Time		was the basis for Rod Serling's Night Gallery 29, (1972)	variant ending
The Root of Ampoi	Spring 1949	The Arkham Sampler	Tales of Science and Sorcery		written in 1930	
Sadastor	Jul 1930	Weird Tales	Out of Space and Time			
The Satyr	Jul 1931	La Paree Stories	Genius Loci and Other Tales	Averoigne		alternative ending
Schizoid Creator	Nov 1953	Fantasy Fiction	Tales of Science and Sorcery			
The Second Interment	Jan 1933	Strange Tales	Out of Space and Time			
The Seed from the Sepulchre	Oct 1933	Weird Tales	Tales of Science and Sorcery			
Seedling of Mars	Fall 1931	Wonder Stories Quarterly (Fall) V3 #1	Tales of Science and Sorcery			
The Seven Geases	Oct 1934	Weird Tales	Lost Worlds	Hyperborea	note: a geis or geas is a curse in Celtic mythology	
Something New	Aug 1924	10 Story Book (V23 #6)	Other Dimensions		non-fantastic fiction	
A Star-Change	May 1933	Wonder Stories	Genius Loci and Other Tales			
Strange Shadows	Nov 1985	The Year's Best Fantasy Stories (11)	Strange Shadows: The Uncollected Fiction and Essays of Clark Ashton Smith		three drafts exist, the third with the title "I Am Your Shadow", written in 1938-1941	
The Supernumerary Corpse	Nov 1932	Weird Tales	Other Dimensions			synopsis
Symposium of the Gorgon	Oct 1958	Fantastic Universe Science Fiction (V10 #4)	Tales of Science and Sorcery			
The Tale of Satampra Zeiros	Nov 1931	Weird Tales	Lost Worlds	Hyperborea		
The Tale of Sir John Maundeville	Oct 1933	The Fantasy Fan	Other Dimensions		also titled "The Kingdom of the Worm"	
The Testament of Athammaus	Oct 1932	Weird Tales	Out of Space and Time	Hyperborea		unpublished synopsis
The Theft of the Thirty-Nine Girdles	Mar 1958	Saturn Science Fiction and Fantasy (V1 #5)	Tales of Science and Sorcery	Hyperborea		
The Third Episode of Vathek	Summer 1937	Leaves (Summer)	The Abominations of Yondo		a fragment by William Beckford completed by Smith	
Thirteen Phantasms	Mar 1936	Fantasy Magazine	Other Dimensions		written in 1929	
Told in the Desert	1964	Over the Edge: Stories to Freeze Your Blood	Other Dimensions		written in 1930	
The Tomb-Spawn	May 1934	Weird Tales	Tales of Science and Sorcery	Zothique		
The Treader of the Dust	Aug 1935	Weird Tales	Lost Worlds			
Ubbo-Sathla	Jul 1933	Weird Tales	Out of Space and Time	Hyperborea	see Clark Ashton Smith deities	unpublished synopsis
The Uncharted Isle	Nov 1930	Weird Tales	Out of Space and Time	Lemuria		
The Vaults of Yoh-Vombis	May 1932	Weird Tales	Out of Space and Time	Aihai (Mars)		abridged version unpublished synopsis
The Venus of Azombeii	Jun 1931	Weird Tales	Other Dimensions			
A Vintage from Atlantis	Sep 1933	Weird Tales	The Abominations of Yondo	Poseidonis		unpublished synopsis
The Voyage of King Euvoran	1933	The Double Shadow and Other Fantasies	The Abominations of Yondo	Zothique	alternate version published in Weird Tales Sep 1947 as "The Quest of the Gazolba"	
A Voyage to Sfanomoë	Aug 1931	Weird Tales	Lost Worlds	Poseidonis		
Vulthoom	Sep 1935	Weird Tales	Genius Loci and Other Tales	Aihai (Mars)	also exists as a synopsis. see Clark Ashton Smith deities.	synopsis version
The Weaver in the Vault	Jan 1934	Weird Tales	Genius Loci and Other Tales	Zothique		
The Weird of Avoosl Wuthoqquan	Jun 1932	Weird Tales	Out of Space and Time	Hyperborea	also exists as a synopsis	synopsis version
The White Sybil	1935	The White Sybil	The Abominations of Yondo	Hyperborea		
The Willow Landscape	1933	The Double Shadow and Other Fantasies	Genius Loci and Other Tales			
The Witchcraft of Ulua	Feb 1934	Weird Tales	The Abominations of Yondo	Zothique		
Xeethra	Dec 1934	Weird Tales	Lost Worlds	Zothique		

=== Fragments ===
Unfinished short fiction (including fragments and synopses) by Clark Ashton Smith
Title	Date published	1st published in	Anthologized in	Fictional setting	Notes	Online versions
Across the Time-Stream	1989	Strange Shadows: The Uncollected Fiction and Essays of Clark Ashton Smith	Strange Shadows: The Uncollected Fiction and Essays of Clark Ashton Smith		a synopsis for what would become "The Eternal World"	
The After-Men	1989	Strange Shadows: The Uncollected Fiction and Essays of Clark Ashton Smith	Strange Shadows: The Uncollected Fiction and Essays of Clark Ashton Smith		a synopsis	
The Arm from the Fig-Tree	1989	Strange Shadows: The Uncollected Fiction and Essays of Clark Ashton Smith	Strange Shadows: The Uncollected Fiction and Essays of Clark Ashton Smith		a synopsis	
Ascharia	Nov 1984	Untold Tales of Clark Ashton Smith (Crypt of Cthulhu, #27)	Strange Shadows: The Uncollected Fiction and Essays of Clark Ashton Smith		a synopsis and a fragment	
The Atmospheric Entity	1989	Strange Shadows: The Uncollected Fiction and Essays of Clark Ashton Smith	Strange Shadows: The Uncollected Fiction and Essays of Clark Ashton Smith		a synopsis	
Between Two Worlds	1989	Strange Shadows: The Uncollected Fiction and Essays of Clark Ashton Smith	Strange Shadows: The Uncollected Fiction and Essays of Clark Ashton Smith		a synopsis	
Beyond the Rose-Arbor	1989	Strange Shadows: The Uncollected Fiction and Essays of Clark Ashton Smith	Strange Shadows: The Uncollected Fiction and Essays of Clark Ashton Smith		a synopsis	
A Bottle On the Orinoco	1989	Strange Shadows: The Uncollected Fiction and Essays of Clark Ashton Smith	Strange Shadows: The Uncollected Fiction and Essays of Clark Ashton Smith		a synopsis	
The Burial-Place of the Unknown	1989	Strange Shadows: The Uncollected Fiction and Essays of Clark Ashton Smith	Strange Shadows: The Uncollected Fiction and Essays of Clark Ashton Smith		a synopsis	
The Cairn	1989	Strange Shadows: The Uncollected Fiction and Essays of Clark Ashton Smith	Strange Shadows: The Uncollected Fiction and Essays of Clark Ashton Smith		a synopsis	
Chincharrero	1989	Strange Shadows: The Uncollected Fiction and Essays of Clark Ashton Smith	Strange Shadows: The Uncollected Fiction and Essays of Clark Ashton Smith		a fragment	
The Conquest of Mercury	1989	Strange Shadows: The Uncollected Fiction and Essays of Clark Ashton Smith	Strange Shadows: The Uncollected Fiction and Essays of Clark Ashton Smith		a synopsis	
The Cosmic Sequel	1989	Strange Shadows: The Uncollected Fiction and Essays of Clark Ashton Smith	Strange Shadows: The Uncollected Fiction and Essays of Clark Ashton Smith		a synopsis	
The Crabs of Iribos	1989	Strange Shadows: The Uncollected Fiction and Essays of Clark Ashton Smith	Strange Shadows: The Uncollected Fiction and Essays of Clark Ashton Smith		a synopsis	
The Cypress	1989	Strange Shadows: The Uncollected Fiction and Essays of Clark Ashton Smith	Strange Shadows: The Uncollected Fiction and Essays of Clark Ashton Smith		a synopsis	
Dead Assassins	1989	Strange Shadows: The Uncollected Fiction and Essays of Clark Ashton Smith	Strange Shadows: The Uncollected Fiction and Essays of Clark Ashton Smith		a synopsis	
The Demon From Alphard	1989	Strange Shadows: The Uncollected Fiction and Essays of Clark Ashton Smith	Strange Shadows: The Uncollected Fiction and Essays of Clark Ashton Smith		a synopsis	
The Destination of Gideon Balcoth	1989	Strange Shadows: The Uncollected Fiction and Essays of Clark Ashton Smith	Strange Shadows: The Uncollected Fiction and Essays of Clark Ashton Smith		a synopsis	
Djinn without A Bottle	1989	Strange Shadows: The Uncollected Fiction and Essays of Clark Ashton Smith	Strange Shadows: The Uncollected Fiction and Essays of Clark Ashton Smith		a fragment	
The Dome in the Ice	1989	Strange Shadows: The Uncollected Fiction and Essays of Clark Ashton Smith	Strange Shadows: The Uncollected Fiction and Essays of Clark Ashton Smith		a synopsis	
The Doom of Azédarac	1979	The Black Book of Clark Ashton Smith		Averoigne	a fragment	
The Double Dream	1989	Strange Shadows: The Uncollected Fiction and Essays of Clark Ashton Smith	Strange Shadows: The Uncollected Fiction and Essays of Clark Ashton Smith		a synopsis	
The Eggs from Saturn	1989	Strange Shadows: The Uncollected Fiction and Essays of Clark Ashton Smith	Strange Shadows: The Uncollected Fiction and Essays of Clark Ashton Smith		a fragment	
The Elder Manor	1989	Strange Shadows: The Uncollected Fiction and Essays of Clark Ashton Smith	Strange Shadows: The Uncollected Fiction and Essays of Clark Ashton Smith		a synopsis	
The Embassy to Tiirath	1989	Strange Shadows: The Uncollected Fiction and Essays of Clark Ashton Smith	Strange Shadows: The Uncollected Fiction and Essays of Clark Ashton Smith		a synopsis	
The Entity of the Sands	1989	Strange Shadows: The Uncollected Fiction and Essays of Clark Ashton Smith	Strange Shadows: The Uncollected Fiction and Essays of Clark Ashton Smith		a synopsis	
Eviction by Night	1989	Strange Shadows: The Uncollected Fiction and Essays of Clark Ashton Smith	Strange Shadows: The Uncollected Fiction and Essays of Clark Ashton Smith		a fragment	
An Excursion in Time	1989	Strange Shadows: The Uncollected Fiction and Essays of Clark Ashton Smith	Strange Shadows: The Uncollected Fiction and Essays of Clark Ashton Smith		a synopsis	
The Feet of Sidaiva	Nov 1984	Untold Tales of Clark Ashton Smith (Crypt of Cthulhu, #27)	Strange Shadows: The Uncollected Fiction and Essays of Clark Ashton Smith	Zothique	a one-sentence plot synopsis	
From A Lost World	1989	Strange Shadows: The Uncollected Fiction and Essays of Clark Ashton Smith	Strange Shadows: The Uncollected Fiction and Essays of Clark Ashton Smith		a synopsis	
The Galley from Atlantis	1989	Strange Shadows: The Uncollected Fiction and Essays of Clark Ashton Smith	Strange Shadows: The Uncollected Fiction and Essays of Clark Ashton Smith		a synopsis	
The Gargoyle of Vyones	1989	Strange Shadows: The Uncollected Fiction and Essays of Clark Ashton Smith	Strange Shadows: The Uncollected Fiction and Essays of Clark Ashton Smith	Averoigne	a synopsis	
The Ghoul from Mercury	1989	Strange Shadows: The Uncollected Fiction and Essays of Clark Ashton Smith	Strange Shadows: The Uncollected Fiction and Essays of Clark Ashton Smith		a synopsis	
A Gift from the Beloved	1989	Strange Shadows: The Uncollected Fiction and Essays of Clark Ashton Smith	Strange Shadows: The Uncollected Fiction and Essays of Clark Ashton Smith		a synopsis	
The God of the Asteroid	1989	Strange Shadows: The Uncollected Fiction and Essays of Clark Ashton Smith	Strange Shadows: The Uncollected Fiction and Essays of Clark Ashton Smith		a synopsis	
Gossip	1989	Strange Shadows: The Uncollected Fiction and Essays of Clark Ashton Smith	Strange Shadows: The Uncollected Fiction and Essays of Clark Ashton Smith		a fragment	
Hecate	1989	Strange Shadows: The Uncollected Fiction and Essays of Clark Ashton Smith	Strange Shadows: The Uncollected Fiction and Essays of Clark Ashton Smith		a one-sentence synopsis	
The House of Haon-Dor	Nov 1984	Untold Tales of Clark Ashton Smith (Crypt of Cthulhu, #27)	Strange Shadows: The Uncollected Fiction and Essays of Clark Ashton Smith	Hyperborea	a fragment, written in 1933	
The Hyperborean City	Nov 1984	Untold Tales of Clark Ashton Smith (Crypt of Cthulhu, #27)	Strange Shadows: The Uncollected Fiction and Essays of Clark Ashton Smith	Hyperborea	a synopsis	
I Am A Witch	1989	Strange Shadows: The Uncollected Fiction and Essays of Clark Ashton Smith	Strange Shadows: The Uncollected Fiction and Essays of Clark Ashton Smith		a synopsis	
In A Hashish-Dream	Nov 1984	Untold Tales of Clark Ashton Smith (Crypt of Cthulhu, #27)	Strange Shadows: The Uncollected Fiction and Essays of Clark Ashton Smith		a fragment	
In the Book of Vergama	1989	Strange Shadows: The Uncollected Fiction and Essays of Clark Ashton Smith	Strange Shadows: The Uncollected Fiction and Essays of Clark Ashton Smith		a fragment	
The Infernal Star	1989	Strange Shadows: The Uncollected Fiction and Essays of Clark Ashton Smith	Strange Shadows: The Uncollected Fiction and Essays of Clark Ashton Smith		a fragment, longest incomplete story	
The Inverse Avatar	1989	Strange Shadows: The Uncollected Fiction and Essays of Clark Ashton Smith	Strange Shadows: The Uncollected Fiction and Essays of Clark Ashton Smith		a synopsis	
The Invisible Devourer	1989	Strange Shadows: The Uncollected Fiction and Essays of Clark Ashton Smith	Strange Shadows: The Uncollected Fiction and Essays of Clark Ashton Smith		a one-sentence synopsis	
The Invisible Satellite	1989	Strange Shadows: The Uncollected Fiction and Essays of Clark Ashton Smith	Strange Shadows: The Uncollected Fiction and Essays of Clark Ashton Smith		a one-sentence synopsis	
The Lord of Lunacy	1989	Strange Shadows: The Uncollected Fiction and Essays of Clark Ashton Smith	Strange Shadows: The Uncollected Fiction and Essays of Clark Ashton Smith		a fragment	
The Lunar Brain	1989	Strange Shadows: The Uncollected Fiction and Essays of Clark Ashton Smith	Strange Shadows: The Uncollected Fiction and Essays of Clark Ashton Smith		a synopsis	
The Lunar Path	1989	Strange Shadows: The Uncollected Fiction and Essays of Clark Ashton Smith	Strange Shadows: The Uncollected Fiction and Essays of Clark Ashton Smith		a synopsis	
Maker of Prodigies	1989	Strange Shadows: The Uncollected Fiction and Essays of Clark Ashton Smith	Strange Shadows: The Uncollected Fiction and Essays of Clark Ashton Smith		a synopsis	
Mandor's Enemy	Nov 1984	Untold Tales of Clark Ashton Smith (Crypt of Cthulhu, #27)	Strange Shadows: The Uncollected Fiction and Essays of Clark Ashton Smith	Zothique	a fragment	
The Master of Destruction	Nov 1984	Untold Tales of Clark Ashton Smith (Crypt of Cthulhu, #27)	Strange Shadows: The Uncollected Fiction and Essays of Clark Ashton Smith		a fragment and a synopsis	
The Mechanical Murder	1989	Strange Shadows: The Uncollected Fiction and Essays of Clark Ashton Smith	Strange Shadows: The Uncollected Fiction and Essays of Clark Ashton Smith		a one-sentence synopsis	
Men of the Macrocosm	1989	Strange Shadows: The Uncollected Fiction and Essays of Clark Ashton Smith	Strange Shadows: The Uncollected Fiction and Essays of Clark Ashton Smith		a synopsis	
The Menace of the Dust	1989	Strange Shadows: The Uncollected Fiction and Essays of Clark Ashton Smith	Strange Shadows: The Uncollected Fiction and Essays of Clark Ashton Smith		a one-sentence synopsis	
The Minotaur's Brother	1989	Strange Shadows: The Uncollected Fiction and Essays of Clark Ashton Smith	Strange Shadows: The Uncollected Fiction and Essays of Clark Ashton Smith		a synopsis	
A Misadventure of Don Juan	1989	Strange Shadows: The Uncollected Fiction and Essays of Clark Ashton Smith	Strange Shadows: The Uncollected Fiction and Essays of Clark Ashton Smith		a synopsis	
Mnemoka	1989	Strange Shadows: The Uncollected Fiction and Essays of Clark Ashton Smith	Strange Shadows: The Uncollected Fiction and Essays of Clark Ashton Smith		a fragment	
The Moon-Spectre	1989	Strange Shadows: The Uncollected Fiction and Essays of Clark Ashton Smith	Strange Shadows: The Uncollected Fiction and Essays of Clark Ashton Smith		a synopsis	
The Moraine	1989	Strange Shadows: The Uncollected Fiction and Essays of Clark Ashton Smith	Strange Shadows: The Uncollected Fiction and Essays of Clark Ashton Smith		a one-sentence synopsis	
The Mummy-Case of Hammen-Tha	1989	Strange Shadows: The Uncollected Fiction and Essays of Clark Ashton Smith	Strange Shadows: The Uncollected Fiction and Essays of Clark Ashton Smith		a synopsis	
The Music of Death	1989	Strange Shadows: The Uncollected Fiction and Essays of Clark Ashton Smith	Strange Shadows: The Uncollected Fiction and Essays of Clark Ashton Smith		a synopsis and a fragment	
The Mysterious Poison	1989	Strange Shadows: The Uncollected Fiction and Essays of Clark Ashton Smith	Strange Shadows: The Uncollected Fiction and Essays of Clark Ashton Smith		a one-sentence synopsis	
Neria	1989	Strange Shadows: The Uncollected Fiction and Essays of Clark Ashton Smith	Strange Shadows: The Uncollected Fiction and Essays of Clark Ashton Smith		a synopsis	
The Ocean-World of Alioth	Nov 1984	Untold Tales of Clark Ashton Smith (Crypt of Cthulhu, #27)	Strange Shadows: The Uncollected Fiction and Essays of Clark Ashton Smith	The Alcyone	a synopsis and a fragment	
Offspring of the Grave	1989	Strange Shadows: The Uncollected Fiction and Essays of Clark Ashton Smith	Strange Shadows: The Uncollected Fiction and Essays of Clark Ashton Smith		a synopsis	
The Oracle of Sadoqua	1979	The Black Book of Clark Ashton Smith		Averoigne	a fragment	
The Other Entity	1989	Strange Shadows: The Uncollected Fiction and Essays of Clark Ashton Smith	Strange Shadows: The Uncollected Fiction and Essays of Clark Ashton Smith		a one-sentence synopsis	
The Pilgrim of Eternity	1989	Strange Shadows: The Uncollected Fiction and Essays of Clark Ashton Smith	Strange Shadows: The Uncollected Fiction and Essays of Clark Ashton Smith		a synopsis	
The Point of the Jest	Nov 1984	Untold Tales of Clark Ashton Smith (Crypt of Cthulhu, #27)	Strange Shadows: The Uncollected Fiction and Essays of Clark Ashton Smith		a fragment	
Poseidon	1989	Strange Shadows: The Uncollected Fiction and Essays of Clark Ashton Smith	Strange Shadows: The Uncollected Fiction and Essays of Clark Ashton Smith		a one-sentence synopsis	
Prisoners of the Black Dimension	1989	Strange Shadows: The Uncollected Fiction and Essays of Clark Ashton Smith	Strange Shadows: The Uncollected Fiction and Essays of Clark Ashton Smith		a one-sentence synopsis	
The Protean People	1989	Strange Shadows: The Uncollected Fiction and Essays of Clark Ashton Smith	Strange Shadows: The Uncollected Fiction and Essays of Clark Ashton Smith		a one-sentence synopsis	
Queen of the Sabbat	Nov 1984	Untold Tales of Clark Ashton Smith (Crypt of Cthulhu, #27)	Strange Shadows: The Uncollected Fiction and Essays of Clark Ashton Smith	Averoigne	a synopsis	
The Re-Union	1989	Strange Shadows: The Uncollected Fiction and Essays of Clark Ashton Smith	Strange Shadows: The Uncollected Fiction and Essays of Clark Ashton Smith		a two-sentence synopsis	
The Rebirth of the Flame	Nov 1984	Untold Tales of Clark Ashton Smith (Crypt of Cthulhu, #27)	Strange Shadows: The Uncollected Fiction and Essays of Clark Ashton Smith		a synopsis	
The River of Mystery	1989	Strange Shadows: The Uncollected Fiction and Essays of Clark Ashton Smith	Strange Shadows: The Uncollected Fiction and Essays of Clark Ashton Smith		a synopsis	
The Scarab	1989	Strange Shadows: The Uncollected Fiction and Essays of Clark Ashton Smith	Strange Shadows: The Uncollected Fiction and Essays of Clark Ashton Smith		a synopsis	
Shapes of Adamant	Nov 1984	Untold Tales of Clark Ashton Smith (Crypt of Cthulhu, #27)	Strange Shadows: The Uncollected Fiction and Essays of Clark Ashton Smith	Zothique	a fragment	
Slaves of the Black Pillar	Nov 1984	Untold Tales of Clark Ashton Smith (Crypt of Cthulhu, #27)	Strange Shadows: The Uncollected Fiction and Essays of Clark Ashton Smith		a synopsis and fragment, also titled "The Drug from Algol"	
A Sojourn in Mercury	1989	Strange Shadows: The Uncollected Fiction and Essays of Clark Ashton Smith	Strange Shadows: The Uncollected Fiction and Essays of Clark Ashton Smith		a one-sentence synopsis	
The Sorceress of Averoigne	Nov 1984	Untold Tales of Clark Ashton Smith (Crypt of Cthulhu, #27)	Strange Shadows: The Uncollected Fiction and Essays of Clark Ashton Smith	Averoigne	a fragment, also titled "The Tower of Istarelle"	
The Spectral Tarn	1989	Strange Shadows: The Uncollected Fiction and Essays of Clark Ashton Smith	Strange Shadows: The Uncollected Fiction and Essays of Clark Ashton Smith		a synopsis	
A Tale of Gnydron	1989	Strange Shadows: The Uncollected Fiction and Essays of Clark Ashton Smith	Strange Shadows: The Uncollected Fiction and Essays of Clark Ashton Smith		a synopsis	
The Thing from the Antarctic	1989	Strange Shadows: The Uncollected Fiction and Essays of Clark Ashton Smith	Strange Shadows: The Uncollected Fiction and Essays of Clark Ashton Smith		a synopsis	
The Transformation of Athanor	1989	Strange Shadows: The Uncollected Fiction and Essays of Clark Ashton Smith	Strange Shadows: The Uncollected Fiction and Essays of Clark Ashton Smith		a synopsis	
The Trilithon	1989	Strange Shadows: The Uncollected Fiction and Essays of Clark Ashton Smith	Strange Shadows: The Uncollected Fiction and Essays of Clark Ashton Smith		a synopsis	
Unquiet Boundary	Nov 1984	Untold Tales of Clark Ashton Smith (Crypt of Cthulhu, #27)	Strange Shadows: The Uncollected Fiction and Essays of Clark Ashton Smith		a fragment	
The Vapor from the Void	1989	Strange Shadows: The Uncollected Fiction and Essays of Clark Ashton Smith	Strange Shadows: The Uncollected Fiction and Essays of Clark Ashton Smith		a synopsis	
The Vestibule of the Past	1989	Strange Shadows: The Uncollected Fiction and Essays of Clark Ashton Smith	Strange Shadows: The Uncollected Fiction and Essays of Clark Ashton Smith		a synopsis	
Vizaphmal in Ophiuchus	Nov 1984	Untold Tales of Clark Ashton Smith (Crypt of Cthulhu, #27)	Strange Shadows: The Uncollected Fiction and Essays of Clark Ashton Smith		a synopsis	
The Werewolf of Averoigne	Nov 1984	Untold Tales of Clark Ashton Smith (Crypt of Cthulhu, #27)	Strange Shadows: The Uncollected Fiction and Essays of Clark Ashton Smith	Averoigne	a synopsis	
Wingless Phoenix	1989	Strange Shadows: The Uncollected Fiction and Essays of Clark Ashton Smith	Strange Shadows: The Uncollected Fiction and Essays of Clark Ashton Smith		a fragment	
The World-Maker	1989	Strange Shadows: The Uncollected Fiction and Essays of Clark Ashton Smith	Strange Shadows: The Uncollected Fiction and Essays of Clark Ashton Smith		a synopsis	
The Youngest Vampire	1989	Strange Shadows: The Uncollected Fiction and Essays of Clark Ashton Smith	Strange Shadows: The Uncollected Fiction and Essays of Clark Ashton Smith		a synopsis	

=== Collections ===
- The Double Shadow and Other Fantasies (Auburn Journal, 1933)
- Out of Space and Time (Arkham House, 1942)
- Lost Worlds (Arkham House, 1944)
- Genius Loci and Other Tales (Arkham House, 1948)
- The Abominations of Yondo (Arkham House, 1960)
- Tales of Science and Sorcery (Arkham House, 1964)
- Other Dimensions (Arkham House, 1970)
- Zothique (Ballantine Books, 1970)
- Hyperborea (Ballantine Books, 1971)
- Xiccarph (Ballantine Books, 1972)
- Poseidonis (Ballantine Books, 1973)
- A Rendezvous in Averoigne (Arkham House, 1988)
- Strange Shadows: The Uncollected Fiction and Essays (Greenwood Press, 1989)
- The Emperor of Dreams (Gollancz, 2002)
- The Sword of Zagan And Other Writings (Hippocampus Press, 2004)
- The Collected Fantasies of Clark Ashton Smith, Vol. 1: The End of the Story (Night Shade Books, 2006)
- The Collected Fantasies of Clark Ashton Smith, Vol. 2: The Door to Saturn (Night Shade Books, 2007)
- The Collected Fantasies of Clark Ashton Smith, Vol. 3: A Vintage from Atlantis (Night Shade Books, 2007)
- The Collected Fantasies of Clark Ashton Smith, Vol. 4: The Maze of the Enchanter (Night Shade Books, 2008)
- The Collected Fantasies of Clark Ashton Smith, Vol. 5: The Last Hieroglyph (Night Shade Books, 2009)
- The Miscellaneous Writings of Clark Ashton Smith (Night Shade Books, 2011)

== Prose poems ==
Prose Poems by Clark Ashton Smith
Title	Date written/published	1st published in	Anthologized in	Fictional setting	First line	Notes	Online versions
The Abomination of Desolation	Dec 18, 1929	Poems in Prose (1965)	Poems in Prose, Nostalgia of the Unknown: The Complete Prose Poetry		The desert of Soom is said to lie at the world's unchartable extreme, between the lands that are little known and those that are scarcely…	also titled "The Desolation of Soom" and "The Horror of Soom"	
The Black Lake	1922	Ebony and Crystal (1922)	Poems in Prose, Nostalgia of the Unknown: The Complete Prose Poetry		In a land where weirdness and mystery had strongly leagued themselves with eternal desolation, the lake was out-poured at an undiscoverable date of elder aeons,…		
The Caravan	1922	Ebony and Crystal (1922)	Poems in Prose, Nostalgia of the Unknown: The Complete Prose Poetry		My dreams are like a caravan that departed long ago, with tumult of intrepid banners and spears, and the clamour of bugles and brave, adventurous…		
Chinoiserie	1960	The Abominations of Yondo (1960)	The Abominations of Yondo, Poems in Prose, Nostalgia of the Unknown: The Complete Prose Poetry		Ling Yang, the poet, sits all day in his hut among the willows by the river-side, and dreams of the Lady Moy. Spring and the…		
The City of Destruction	1948	Selected Poems (1971)	Nostalgia of the Unknown: The Complete Prose Poetry		The city is surrounded with ramparts like a mountain-range…	a prose version of "The City of Destruction", after Smith's unfinished poem of that name; a fragment	
The Corpse and the Skeleton	Apr 15, 1915	Poems in Prose (1965)	Poems in Prose, Nostalgia of the Unknown: The Complete Prose Poetry		Scene: The catacombs of the ancient city of Oomal. A new corpse has been deposited alongside a skeleton, which, from its mouldiness and worm-picked appearance,…		
The Crystals	Jul 2, 1914	Poems in Prose (1965)	Poems in Prose, Nostalgia of the Unknown: The Complete Prose Poetry		Raptly as one who would divine the perilous eyes of Sleep, and the dreams and mysteries which lurk therein, I sought to fathom the gulf-enclosing…		
The Days	1973	Grotesques and Fantastiques: A Selection of Previously Unpublished Drawings and Poems (1973)	Nostalgia of the Unknown: The Complete Prose Poetry (1988), Strange Shadows: The Uncollected Fiction and Essays of Clark Ashton Smith (1989)		O Fairest, O dearest, to what shall I liken thy days? Methinks are as precious gems, as pearls and amethysts, which, from a broken string,…		
The Demon, the Angel, and Beauty	c. May 1913	Ebony and Crystal (1922)	Poems in Prose, Nostalgia of the Unknown: The Complete Prose Poetry		Of the Demon who standeth or walketh always with me at my left hand, I asked: Hast thou seen Beauty? Her that meseemeth was the…		
A Dream of Lethe	1922	Ebony and Crystal (1922)	Poems in Prose, Nostalgia of the Unknown: The Complete Prose Poetry		In the quest of her whom I had lost, I came at length to the shores of Lethe, under the vault of an immense, empty,…		
Ennui (In)	Feb 26, 1918	Selected Poems (1971)	Nostalgia of the Unknown: The Complete Prose Poetry		In the alcove whose curtains are cloth-of-gold, and whose pillars are fluted sapphire, reclines the emperor Chan, on his couch of ebony set with opals…		
The Flower Devil	1922	Ebony and Crystal (1922)	Poems in Prose, Nostalgia of the Unknown: The Complete Prose Poetry		In a basin of porphyry, at the summit of a pillar of serpentine, the thing has existed from primeval time, in the garden of the…		
The Forbidden Forest	1965	Poems in Prose (1965)	Poems in Prose, Nostalgia of the Unknown: The Complete Prose Poetry		The child Natha lived with his father and mother in a little house not far from the verge of the great jungle. Every day he…		
From the Crypts of Memory	1922	Bohemia V2 #3, (Apr 1917), Ebony and Crystal, Auburn Journal (1922)	Out of Space and Time, Poems in Prose, Nostalgia of the Unknown: The Complete Prose Poetry		Aeons of aeons ago, in an epoch whose marvelous worlds have crumbled, and whose mighty suns are less than shadow, I dwelt in a star…	two versions	
The Frozen Waterfall	1988	Nostalgia of the Unknown: The Complete Prose Poetry (1988)	Nostalgia of the Unknown: The Complete Prose Poetry, Strange Shadows: The Uncollected Fiction and Essays of Clark Ashton Smith		I returned on a winter day to the mountain stream, upon whose banks we roamed so long ago when the rich azaleas leaned above it…		
The Garden and the Tomb	Jun 9, 1915	Ebony and Crystal (1922)	Poems in Prose, Nostalgia of the Unknown: The Complete Prose Poetry		I know a garden of flowers-flowers lovely and marvellous and multiform as the orchids of far, exotic worlds-as the flowers of manifold petal, whose colours…		
The Image of Bronze and the Image of Iron	1965	Poems in Prose (1965)	Poems in Prose, Nostalgia of the Unknown: The Complete Prose Poetry		In the temple of the city of Morm, which lies between the desert and the sea, are two images of thegod Amanon,- a bronze image…	unfinished	
Images	1922	Ebony and Crystal (1922), Auburn Journal, (19 Jul 1923)	Poems in Prose, Nostalgia of the Unknown: The Complete Prose Poetry		Thy tears are not as mine: Thou weepest as a green fountain among palms and roses, with lightly falling drops that bedew the flowery turf.…		
In Cocaigne	1922	Ebony and Crystal (1922), Auburn Journal, (19 Jul 1923)	Poems in Prose, Nostalgia of the Unknown: The Complete Prose Poetry		It was a windless afternoon of April, beneath skies that were tender as the smile of love, when we went forth, you and I, to…		
The Lake of Enchanted Silence	1988	Nostalgia of the Unknown: The Complete Prose Poetry (1988)	Nostalgia of the Unknown: The Complete Prose Poetry, Strange Shadows: The Uncollected Fiction and Essays of Clark Ashton Smith		It lies with in a land that is only seen by the sun and the moon and the horizon-questing stars. The sky-wrestled mountains, like sentries…		
The Land of Fruitful Palms	1988 and 1989	Nostalgia of the Unknown: The Complete Prose Poetry (1988)	Nostalgia of the Unknown: The Complete Prose Poetry, Strange Shadows: The Uncollected Fiction and Essays of Clark Ashton Smith		It is a land of fruitful palms and flowering myrtles, with winds that are gentle as the sighs of woman, and pearling fountains delicious as…		untitled fragment
The Litany of the Seven Kisses	Apr 13, 1921	Ebony and Crystal (1922), Laughing Horse #6, (1923)	Poems in Prose, Nostalgia of the Unknown: The Complete Prose Poetry		I kiss thy hands-thy hands. whose fingers are delicate and the pale as the petals of the white lotus.		
The Lotus and the Moon	1965	Poems in Prose (1965)	Poems in Prose, Nostalgia of the Unknown: The Complete Prose Poetry		I stood with my beloved in the lotus pool, when the moon was round as the great ivory breast of a Titaness, and the flowers…		
The Memnons of the Night	Feb 1917	Bohemia V2 #1, (1 Feb 1917), Ebony and Crystal, Auburn Journal (1922), Phantagraph V4 #2, (Dec 1935)	Poems in Prose, Nostalgia of the Unknown: The Complete Prose Poetry		Ringed with a bronze horizon, which, at a point immensely remote, seems welded with the blue brilliance of a sky of steel, they oppose the…		
The Mirror in the Hall of Ebony	1960	The Abominations of Yondo (1960)	The Abominations of Yondo, Poems in Prose, Nostalgia of the Unknown: The Complete Prose Poetry		From the nethermost profound of slumber, from a gulf beyond the sun and stars that illume the Lethean shoals and the vague lands of somnolent…		
The Mithridate	1965	Poems in Prose (1965)	Poems in Prose, Nostalgia of the Unknown: The Complete Prose Poetry		The world has a thousand poisons, thin or potent, honey-like or nauseous, quick or languid, corrosive and deadly, or captious and deceptive and narcotic. There…		
The Mortuary	1971	The Mortuary, Roy A. Squires (1971)	Nostalgia of the Unknown: The Complete Prose Poetry, Strange Shadows: The Uncollected Fiction and Essays of Clark Ashton Smith		I sought the cloister of the dead, when, fallen athwart the funereal glooms of yew and cypress, the sunset wrought a phantom flush upon the…		
The Muse of Atlantis	1973	Poseidonis (1973)	Poems in Prose, Nostalgia of the Unknown: The Complete Prose Poetry	Poseidonis	Will you not join me in Atlantis, where we will go down through streets of blue and yellow marble to the wharves of orichalch, and…	also titled "From a Letter"	version "from a letter"
The Muse of Hyperborea	1965	Poems in Prose (1965)	Poems in Prose, Nostalgia of the Unknown: The Complete Prose Poetry	Hyperborea	Too far away is her wan and mortal face, and too remote are the snows of her lethal breast, for mine eyes to behold them…		
Narcissus	1965	Poems in Prose (1965)	Poems in Prose, Nostalgia of the Unknown: The Complete Prose Poetry		Splenetic, pale Narcissus, in the green dead depth of some rotting pool: thou seest thine image drown and re-emmerge, beneath the shifting iridescence of corruption,…		
Offering	March 12, 1928	Grotesques and Fantastiques: A Selection of Previously Unpublished Drawings and Poems (1973)	Nostalgia of the Unknown: The Complete Prose Poetry, Strange Shadows: The Uncollected Fiction and Essays of Clark Ashton Smith		Hast thou desired to love wherein the fervor of the mountain flames of autumn is mingled with all the tenderness of half-unfolded…		
The Osprey and the Shark	December 18, 1929	Nostalgia of the Unknown: The Complete Prose Poetry (1988)	Nostalgia of the Unknown: The Complete Prose Poetry, Strange Shadows: The Uncollected Fiction and Essays of Clark Ashton Smith		An osprey who had sighted a plump turbot glided to the surface of the waves; and at that very same moment a…		
The Passing of Aphrodite	Dec 1934	The Fantasy Fan V2 #4, (Dec 1934), Acolyte (Summer) V1 #4, (1943)	The Abominations of Yondo, Poems in Prose, Nostalgia of the Unknown: The Complete Prose Poetry		In all the lands of Illarion, from mountain-valleys rimmed with unmelting snow, to the great cliffs of sand whose reflex darkens a sleepy, tepid sea,…		
The Peril That Lurks Among Ruins	1945	Acolyte (Winter) V1 #2, (1945)	Poems in Prose, Nostalgia of the Unknown: The Complete Prose Poetry		Go not too often among ruins, said the Daemon in one of his...	two versions	
A Phantasy	1922	Ebony and Crystal (1922)	Poems in Prose, Nostalgia of the Unknown: The Complete Prose Poetry		I have dreamt of an unknown land-a land remote in ulterior time, and alien space not ascertainable; the desert of a long-completed past, upon which…		
Preference	1988	Nostalgia of the Unknown: The Complete Prose Poetry (1988)	Nostalgia of the Unknown: The Complete Prose Poetry, Strange Shadows: The Uncollected Fiction and Essays of Clark Ashton Smith		I would rather look upon thy face than upon the gardens of Atlantis, in the setting of a hyacinthine sun than necromancers have summoned.I would…		
The Princess Almeena	Feb 1920	Smart Set V61 #1, (Feb 1920), Ebony and Crystal, Auburn Journal (1922)	Poems in Prose, Nostalgia of the Unknown: The Complete Prose Poetry		From her balcony of pearl, the princess Almeena, clad in a gown of irisated silk, with her long and sable locks unbound, gazes toward the…		
Remoteness	1922	Ebony and Crystal (1922)	Poems in Prose, Nostalgia of the Unknown: The Complete Prose Poetry		There are days when all the beauty of the world is dim and strange; when the sunlight about me seems to fall on a land…		
The Shadows	1922	Ebony and Crystal (1922)	Out of Space and Time, Poems in Prose, Nostalgia of the Unknown: The Complete Prose Poetry		There were many shadows in the palace of Augusthes, About the silver throne that had blackened beneath the invisible passing of ages, they fell from…		
The Statue of Silence	1922	Ebony and Crystal (1922)	Poems in Prose, Nostalgia of the Unknown: The Complete Prose Poetry		I saw a statue, carven I knew not of what substance, nor with what form or feature, because of the manifold draper of black which…		
The Sun and the Sepulchre	Jun 22 c.1914-15	California Poets (1932)	Poems in Prose, Nostalgia of the Unknown: The Complete Prose Poetry		I saw the declivous latter sunlight fall and glitter upon the sepulchre of one whose immomentous name was holden awhile from Oblivion by the deeply-trenched…		
To the Daemon	Dec 16, 1929	Poems in Prose (1965)	Poems in Prose, Nostalgia of the Unknown: The Complete Prose Poetry		Tell me many tales, O benign maleficent daemon, but tell me none that I have ever heard or have even dreamt of otherwise than obscurely…		
The Touch-Stone	Dec 18, 1929	Poems in Prose (1965)	Poems in Prose, Nostalgia of the Unknown: The Complete Prose Poetry		Nasiphra the philosopher had sought through many years and in many lands for the fabled touch-stone, which was said to reveal the true nature of…		
The Traveller	1922	Ebony and Crystal (1922)	Poems in Prose, Nostalgia of the Unknown: The Complete Prose Poetry		Stranger, where goest thou, in the sad raiment of a pilgrim, with shattered sandals retaining the dustand mire of so many devious ways? With thy…		
Vignettes	1922	Ebony and Crystal (1922)	Poems in Prose, Nostalgia of the Unknown: The Complete Prose Poetry		Surely, beyond the mountains there is peace-beyond the mountains that lie so blue and still at the world's extreme. Such ancient calm, such infinite quietude…		

== Juvenilia ==
Juvenilia by Clark Ashton Smith
Title	Date published	1st published in	Anthologized in	Notes	Online versions
The Animated Sword	2011	The Miscellaneous Writings of Clark Ashton Smith	The Miscellaneous Writings of Clark Ashton Smith	written in 1905	
The Black Diamonds	2002	The Black Diamonds	The Black Diamonds	novel, written in 1907	
The Bronze Image	2004	The Sword of Zagan And Other Writings	The Sword of Zagan And Other Writings		
The Emerald Eye	2004	The Sword of Zagan And Other Writings	The Sword of Zagan And Other Writings	a fragment	
The Emir's Captive	2004	The Sword of Zagan And Other Writings	The Sword of Zagan And Other Writings		
Fakhreddin	2004	The Sword of Zagan And Other Writings	The Sword of Zagan And Other Writings		
The Fulfilled Prophecy	2004	The Sword of Zagan And Other Writings	The Sword of Zagan And Other Writings		
The Ghost of Mohammed Din	Nov 1910	Overland Monthly	Other Dimensions		
The Guardian of the Temple	2004	The Sword of Zagan And Other Writings	The Sword of Zagan And Other Writings	a fragment	
The Haunted Chamber	2004	The Sword of Zagan And Other Writings	The Sword of Zagan And Other Writings		
The Haunted Gong	2004	The Sword of Zagan And Other Writings	The Sword of Zagan And Other Writings		
The Mahout	Aug 1911	The Black Cat (V16 #11)	Other Dimensions		
The Malay Krise	Oct 1910	Overland Monthly	Other Dimensions	also published as "The Malay Creese"	
The Opal of Delhi	2004	The Sword of Zagan And Other Writings	The Sword of Zagan And Other Writings	2 fragments	fragment I fragment II
Prince Alcouz and the Magician	2004	The Sword of Zagan And Other Writings	The Sword of Zagan And Other Writings		2nd version
The Raja and the Tiger	Feb 1912	The Black Cat (V17 #5)	Other Dimensions		
The Red Turban	2004	The Sword of Zagan And Other Writings	The Sword of Zagan And Other Writings	first published as a fragment, complete text published in The Miscellaneous Writings of Clark Ashton Smith	
The Shah's Messenger	2004	The Sword of Zagan And Other Writings	The Sword of Zagan And Other Writings		
The Sword of Zagan	2004	The Sword of Zagan And Other Writings	The Sword of Zagan And Other Writings		
When the Earth Trembled	2004	The Sword of Zagan And Other Writings	The Sword of Zagan And Other Writings	a fragment	
The Yogi's Ring	2004	The Sword of Zagan And Other Writings	The Sword of Zagan And Other Writings	a fragment	

== Plays ==
- The Dead will Cuckold You: A Drama in Six Acts (in verse). Written in 1951. First published in 1989.
- The Fugitives: a fragment. Written on September 17, 1922. Published in 1989.
- Venus And The Priest: a fragment. Published in 1989.

== Lyrics ==
- The Dream Bridge: Music by Henry Cowell, words by Clark Ashton Smith. Written c. 1920.
- Impression: Music by Joseph W. Grant, words by Clark Ashton Smith.
- White Death: Music by Henry Cowell, words by Clark Ashton Smith. Written in Sept 1915.

== Poetry ==
Poems (including translations) by Clark Ashton Smith:

"Abandoned Plum-Orchard" (1958); "Abel et Caïn" (CXLIV. Abel et Caïn); "The Absence of the Muse" (Oct 1921); "The Abyss Triumphant" (3 Aug 1912); "Adjuration" (1976); "Adventure" (14 Feb 1924); "The Adviser" (XCI. L’Avertisseur); "After Armageddon" (1927); "Aftermath of Mining Days" (1971); "Afterwards" (16 Aug 1923); "The Albatross" (II. L’Albatros); "Alchemy of Sorrow" (LXXXII. Alchimie de la douleur) (1925); "Alexandrines" (1918); "Alexandrins"; "Alienage" (5 Jul 1923); ""All is Dross that is not Helena"" (1971); "Allégorie" (CXXXIX. Allégorie); "Almost Anything" (1958); "Alphonse Louis Marie de Lamartine" (Alphonse Louis Marie de Lamartine); "Las Alquerjas Perdidas" (1964); "Alternative" (1958); "Amado Nervo" (Amado Nervo); "Amithaine" (21 Oct 1950); "Amor" (1962); "Amor Aeternalis" (1961); "Amor Autumnalis" (1977); "Amor Hesternalis" (1962); "The Ancient Quest" (1975); "Anodyne of Autumn" (1971); "Antepast" (1922); "Anterior Life" (XII. La Vie Antérieure) (1948); "Anteros" (1958); "Antony and Cleopatra" (Antoine et Cléopâtre); "Apologia" (16 Oct 1924); "Apostrophe" (1971); "Arabesque" (1922); "Ariettes Oubliées IX" (Ariettes Oubliées IX) (1971); "Artemis" (1922); "Artemis" (Artémis); "Ashes of Sunset" (1922); "At Sunrise" (1922); "Atlantis" (1912); "Attar of the Past" (1958); "Au Bord du Léthé" (1971); "August" (1923); "The Autumn Lake" (1971); "Autumn Orchards" (15 Nov 1923); "Autumnal" (1922); "Autumn's Pall"; "Ave Atque Vale" (1918); "Averoigne" (1951); "Averoigne" (manuscript); "Averted Malefice" (1912); "Avowal" (1971); "Bacchante" (1939); "The Balance" (1912); "The Balcony" (1925); "The Balcony" (XXXVII. Le Balcon); "The Barrel of Hate" (LXXV. Le Tonneau de la haine); "The Barrier" (13 Sep 1923); "Basin in Boulder" (1971); "The Beacons" (VI. Les Phares); "Beatrice" (CXL. La Béatrice) (1971); "Le Beau Navire" (LIII. Le Beau Navire); "Beauty" (XVIII. La Beauté) (1 Mar 1925); "Beauty Implacable" (1922); "Bed of Mint" (1971); "Bedouin Song"; "Before Dawn" (1962); "Before Sunrise"; "Belated Love" (1918); "Benares"; "Bénédiction" (I. Bénédiction); "Berries of the Deadly Nightshade" (1971); "Beyond the Door" (1975); "Beyond the Great Wall" (21 Dec 1919); "Les Bijoux" (I. Les Bijoux); "Bird of Long Ago" (1971); "The Black Panther" (La Panthère noire); "The Blind" (CXVI. Les Aveugles); "The Blindness of Orion" (1948); "Bond" (1962); "La Bonne Chanson" (La Bonne Chanson); "Borderland" (1971); "Boys Rob A Yellow-Hammer's Nest" (1971); "Boys Telling Bawdy Tales" (1971); "Brumal" (1 Nov 1923); "Builder of Deserted Hearth" (1971); "The Burden of the Suns" (1977); "The Burning-Ghauts At Benares" (1975); "But Grant, O Venus" (1971); "The Butterfly" (1912); "By the River" (20 Sep 1923); "Calendar" (1971); "Calenture" (1951); "The Call of the Wind" (1970); "Le Calumet de Paix" (LXXXV. Le Calumet de paix); "Cambion" (1951); "Canticle" (1971); "The Castle of Dreams" (1975); "The Cat" (XXXV. Le Chat); "A Catch" (2 Oct 1924); "The Cats" (LXVIII. Les Chats); "Cats in Winter Sunlight" (1958); "Cattle Salute the Psychopomp" (1971); "Causerie" (7 May 1925); "Causerie" (LVI. Causerie); "The Centaur" (1958); "Chainless Captive" (1971); "Chance" (14 Jun 1923); "Change" (12 Jul 1923); "Chanson d'après-midi" (LIX. Chanson d’après-midi); "Chansonette" (1971); "Chant of Autumn" (1922); "Chant to Sirius" (1912); "Une Charogne" (XXX. Une Charogne); "Chastisement of Pride" (XVII. Châtiment de l’orgueil); "Le Chat" (LII. Le Chat); "The Cherry-Snows" (1912); "The Chevelure" (XXIV. La Chevelure); "The Chimera" (1971); "A Chinese Fable"; "The City in the Desert" (1922); "The City of Destruction" (A Fragment) (1989); "The City of the Titans" (1915); "Classic Epigram" (1971); "Classic Reminiscence" (1971); "Cleopatra" (1922); "La Cloche fêlée" (LXXVI. La Cloche fêlée); "The Clock" (CVII. L’Horloge); "The Cloud-Islands" (1912); "Cloudland" (1970); "The Clouds"; "Coldness" (1922); "Companionship"; "Concupiscence" (1971); "Confession" (XLVI. Confession); "Connaissance" (26 Jan 1929); "Consolation" (1925); "Contemplation" (CIV. Receuillement); "Contradiction" (17 May 1923); "Copan" (1912); "Copyist" (1971); "The Coral Reef" (Le Récif de corail); "Correspondences" (IV. Correspondances); "Le Coucher du Soleil Romantique" (C. Le Coucher du Soleil Romantique) (May 1926); "The Cover" (LXXXVII. Le Couvercle); "Crepuscule" (1922); "Le Crépuscule du matin" (CXXVII. Le Crépuscule du matin); "Crimen Amoris" (Crimen Amoris) (1971); "Crows in Spring" (1971); "The Crucifixion of Eros" (1918); "Cumuli" (1971); "Cycles" (4 Jun 1961); "Cyclopean Fear"; "Le Cygne" (CXIII. Le Cygne); "The Cypress" (El ciprés) (1951); "The Dance of Death" (CXXI. Danse macabre); "Dancer" (1971); "The Dark Chateau" (1951); "A Dead City" (1912); "Dead Love" (1973); "Death" (1970); "The Death of Lovers" (CXLVI. La Mort des Amants) (30 Jul 1925); "Decadence" (1971); "December" (6 Dec 1923); "Declining Moon" (1971); "Dedication | to Carol"; "Demogorgon"; "The Denial of St Peter" (XLIII. Le Reniement de Saint Pierre); "The Departed City"; "Departure" (29 Nov 1923); "Desert Dweller" (13 Aug 1937); "Desire of Vastness" (1922); "Desolation" (1922); "Destruction" (CXXXIV. La Destruction); "Dialogue" (1943); "Didus ineptus" (1958); "Disillusionment" (1958); "Dissidence" (29 Nov 1923); "Dissonance" (15 Sep 1919); "Do You Forget, Enchantress?" (1950); "La Dogaresse" (La Dogaresse); "Dolor of Dreams" (30 Aug 1923); "Dominion" (1971); "Dominium in Excelsis" (1951); "Don Juan aux Enfers" (XV. Don Juan aux enfers); "Don Juan Sings" (10 May 1923); "Don Quixote on Market Street" (1951); "¿Donde Duermes, Eldorado?" (1964); "The Doom of America"; "Dos Mitos Y Una Fabula" (1964); "Doubtful Skies" (LI. Ciel Brouillé) (1925); "The Dragon-Fly" (1971); "Dream Mystery" (1915); "A Dream of Beauty" (12 Aug 1911); "A Dream of Oblivion" (1975); "A Dream of the Abyss" (Nov 1933); "The Dream-Bridge" (1912); "The Dream-God's Realm" (1975); "Duality" (Aug 1923); "The Duel" (XXXVI. Duellum); "Ecclesiastes" (L’Ecclésiaste) (1956); "Echo of Memnon" (1922); "Ecstasy" (1922); "Eidolon" (1922); "El Cantar Del Los Seres Libres" (1964); "The Eldritch Dark" (1912); "Elevation" (III. Elévation); "Elysian Landscape" (Paysage Elyséen) (1971); "En Sourdine" (En Sourdine) (1971); "Enchanted Mirrors" (1925); "The End of Autumn" (29 Nov 1923); "The End of Supper"; "Enigma" (1925); "Ennui" (Thou) (Sep 1918); "The Ennuye" (15 Jan 1925); "The Envoys" (7 Jan 1926); "Epigraph for a Condemned Book" (CXXXIII. Epigraphe pour un livre condamné); "Epitaph for An Astronomer" (1971); "Epitaph for the Earth"; "Erato" (1971); "Eros of Ebony" (1951); "Estrangement" (25 Sep 1924); "The Eternal Snows" (1970); "Even in Slumber" (1971); "Evening Harmony" (XLVIII. L’Harmonie du Soir) (1925); "Evening Twilight" (CXIX. Le Crépuscule du soir); "The Evil Monk" (IX. Le Mauvais Moine) (10 Dec 1925); "Examination at Midnight" (LXXXIX. L’Examen de minuit) (1925); "Exchange" (7 Jun 1923); "The Exhibitionists" (Les Montreurs); "The Exile" (1922); "Exorcism" (17 Jan 1929); "Exotic Memory" (1971); "Exotic Perfume" (XXIII. Parfum Exotique) (1925); "Exotique" (1918); "The Eyes of Bertha" (XCVI. Les Yeux de Berthe); "A Fable" (1971); "Fairy-Lanterns" (1912); "Fallen Grape-Leaf" (1971); "The Fanes of Dawn" (1976); "Fantaisie d'antan" (Dec 1929); "Une Fantôme" (XXXIX. Un Fantôme); "Farewell to Eros" (Jun 1938); "The Faun" (Le Faune) (1971); "Fawn-Lilies" (1973); "Feast of St. Anthony" (1958); "February" (1971); "Felo-de-se of the Parasite" (1971); "Femmes damnées" (CXXXVI. Femmes Damnées); "Femmes damnées: Delphine et Hippolyte" (V. Femmes damnées: Delphine et Hippolyte); "Fence And Wall" (1958); "Field Behind the Abattoir" (1971); "La Fin de la journée" (CXLIX. La Fin de la journée); "Finis" (1912); "Fire of Snow" (Jul 1915); "Le Flacon" (XLIX. Le Flacon); "Le Flambeau Vivant" (XLIV. Le Flambeau Vivant); "Flamingoes" (Nov 1919); "The Flight of Azrael" (1952); "Flight of the Yellow-Hammer" (1971); "Flora" (1971); "The Flower-Pot" (Le Pot de fleurs); "Foggy Night" (1971); "For An Antique Lyre" (1962); "For the Dance of Death" (1971); "Forgetfulness" (Jun 1919); "Forgotten Sorrow" (2 Aug 1923); "La Forteresse" (1971); "The Fountain" (XCVII. Le Jet d’eau); "The Fountain of Blood" (CXXXVIII. La Fontaine de san) (1925); "Fragment" (1949); "A Fragment" (1922); "Franciscæ meæ laudes" (LXII. Franciscæ meæ laudes); "From Arcady" (1971); "From the Persian"; "The Fugitives" (1912); "The Funeral Urn" (23 Aug 1923); "Future Meeting" (1971); "Future Pastoral" (1962); "The Game" (CXX. Le Jeu); "The Garden of Dreams" (1973); "Garden of Priapus" (1971); "Geese in the Spring Night" (1958); "The Ghost of theseus" (1971); "The Ghoul And the Seraph" (1922); "The Giantess" (XX. La Géante) (1925); "Girl of Six" (1971); "Give Me Your Lips"; "Goats And Manzanita-Boughs" (1971); "Golden Verses" (Vers dorés); "Gopher-Hole in Orchard" (1971); "Le Goût du néant" (LXXXII. Le Goût du néant); "Grammar-School Vixen" (1971); "Une Gravure fantastique" (LXXIII. Une Gravure Fantastique); "Grecian Yesterday" (1971); "Green" (Green); "Growth of Lichen" (1958); "Le Guignon" (XI. Le Guignon); "The Gulf" (CII. Le Gouffre); "H.P.L." (1959); "The Harbor of Dead Years"; "The Harbour of the Past" (1977); "The Harlot of the World" (27 Mar 1915); "Harmony" (1976); "Harvest Evening" (1958); "The Hashish Eater -or- the Apocalypse of Evil" (20 Feb 1920); "Haunting" (1922); "Hearth on Old Cabin-Site" (1971); "Heliogabalus" (1971); "Hellenic Sequel" (1951); "The Heron" (1971); "Hesperian Fall" (1951); "The Hidden Paradise" (1922); "High Mountain Juniper" (1971); "High Surf" (1951); "High Surf: Monterey Bay" (1976); "The Hill of Dionysus" (5 Nov 1942); "The Hill-Top" (1971); "The Hope of the infinite" (1922); "The Horizon"; "The Horologe" (1963); "The Howlers" (Les Hurleurs); "Humors of Love" (1962); "A Hunter Meets the Martichoras" (1958); "Hymn" (XCIV. Hymne); "Hymn to Beauty" (XXII. Hymne à la Beauté) (1925); "I Dream"; "The Ideal" (XVIII. L’Idéal) (1925); "If Winter Remain" (1971); "Il Bacio" (Il Bacio); "Illumination" (1962); "Illusion"; "Image" (1922); "Imagination"; "Immortelle" (18 Dec 1924); "The Impassible" (L’Impassible); "Impression" (1922); "Improbable Dream" (1971); "In Alexandria" (1971); "In Lemuria" (Aug 1921); "In November" (Dec 1919); "In Saturn" (Feb 1919); "In Slumber" (Aug 1934); "In the Desert" (1971); "In the Ultimate Valleys" (1970); "In the Wind" (Jul 1915); "In Thessaly" (24 May 1935); "Incognita" (1925); "The Incubus of Time" (1963); "Indian Acorn-Mortar" (1971); "Indian Summer" (1971); "Ineffability" (1971); "Inferno" (24 Apr 1918); "The Infinite Quest" (1922); "Inheritance" (1922); "Interim" (13 Nov 1941); "Interrogation" (1925); "Invocation" (Rimas LII); "The Irremediable" (CVI. L’Irrémédiable) (1925); "The Irreparable" (LV. L'Irréparable) (1973); "The Irreparable" (LV. L'Irréparable) (Can); "La Isla Del Naufrago" (1964); "The Isle of Saturn" (1951); "January Willow" (1971); "Jungle Twilight" (1932); "The Kingdom of Shadows" (1922); "The Knoll" (1962); "The Lake" (Le Lac); "L'Ame du vin" (CXXVIII. L’Ame du vin); "Lament for Vixeela" (1996); "The Lament of Icarus" (CIII. Les Plaintes d’un Icare); "Lament of the Stars" (1912); "Lamia" (24 Jan 1940); "L'Amour Supreme" (1973); "The Land of Evil Stars" (1922); "The Last Apricot" (1958); "The Last Goddess" (1971); "The Last Night" (1912); "The Last Oblivion" (7 Feb 1924); "Late November Evening" (1971); "Late Pear-Pruner" (1958); "Laus Mortis" (Sep 1921); "Lawn-Mower" (1976); "Lemurienne" (20 Dec 1923); "L'Ennemi" (X. L’Ennemi); "Lesbos" (IV. Lesbos); "L'Espoir Du Néant" (1971); "Lethe" (From) (1971); "Lethe" (I) (1912); "Lethe" (II. Le Léthé) (1971); "L'Héautontimorouménos" (CV. L’Héautontimorouménos); "L'Homme et la Mer" (XIV. L’Homme et la Mer); "Lichens" (1971); "The Limniad" (1971); "L'Imprévu" (LXXXVIII. L’Imprévu); "Lines on A Picture" (1971); "L'Invitation au Voyage" (LIV. L’Invitation au Voyage); "Litany to Satan" (CXLV. Les Litanies de Satan); "A Live-Oak Leaf" (6 Oct 1911); "Lo Ignoto" (1964); "Lola de Valence" (CX. Lola de Valence); "Los Poetas" (1964); "Loss" (1925); "Love And Death" (1971); "Love and the Cranium" (CXLII. L’Amour et le crâne); "Love in Dreams" (1971); "Love Is Not Yours, Love Is Not Mine" (1922); "Love Malevolent" (1922); "The Love of Falsehood" (CXXII. L’Amour du mensonge); "The Love-Potion" (3 May 1923); "Luminary" (Luminar); "Luna Aeternalis" (1912); "Lunar Mystery" (1915); "La Lune offensée" (CXI. La Lune Offensée); "The Mad Wind" (1912); "A Une Madone" (LVIII. A une Madone); "A Madrigal" (1976); "Madrigal" (1971); "Madrigal of Evanescence" (1971); "Madrigal of Memory" (1971); "Madrigal of Sorrow" (XC. Madrigal triste); "Malediction" (1951); "La Mare" (1971); "Les Marées" (1971); "Une Martyre" (CXXXV. Une Martyre); "Le Masque" (XXI. Le Masque); "The Masque of Forsaken Gods" (1912); "Maya" (1925); "The Maze of Sleep" (1912); "The Meaning" (1912); "Medusa" (17 May 1911); "The Medusa of Despair" (20 Dec 1913); "The Medusa of the Skies" (1912); "A Meeting" (3 Jan 1924); "The Melancholy Pool" (1922); "Memnon At Midnight" (1918); "Memoria Roja" (1964); "Memorial" (1963)	"A Une Mendiante rousse" (CXII. A une Mendiante rousse); "The Messengers" (21 May 1911); "The Metamorphoses of the Vampire" (VI. Les Métamorphoses du Vampire) (1958); "Metaphor" (7 Jun 1923); "Midnight Beach" (5 Sep 1943); "The Mime of Sleep" (1971); "Minatory" (1925); "The Ministers of Law" (1918); "Mirage" (1922); "Le Miroir Des Blanches Fleurs" (1971); "Mirrors" (1922); "The Mirrors of Beauty" (1922); "Mists and Rains" (CXXV. Brumes et pluies) (19 Nov 1925); "Mithridates" (1958); "Mœsta et errabunda" (LXIV. Moesta et errabunda) (1925); "Moly" (1950); "Moments" (1971); "The Monacle" (1958); "Moon-Dawn" (Aug 1923); "Moonlight" (Ambitious); "Moonlight" (Claire de lune) (1971); "The Moonlight Desert"; "Morning on An Eastern Sea" (1970); "The Morning Pool" (1912); "Mors" (24 Apr 1918); "La Mort des Amants" (1971); "La Mort des artistes" (CXLVIII. La Mort des artistes); "La Mort des pauvres" (CXLVII. La Mort des pauvres); "Le Mort Joyeux"; "Le Mort Joyeux" (LXXIV. Le Mort Joyeux); "The Motes" (1922); "Mountain Trail" (1971); "The Mummy" (Jun 1919); "Mummy of the Flower" (1971); "La Muse vénale" (VIII. La Muse vénale) (1925); "Mushroom-Gatherers" (1971); "La Musique" (LXXI. La Musique) (1925); "[Myrtil and Palemone]" (Myrtil et Palémone); "Mystery" (1971); "Nada" (1957); "The Nameless Wraith" (1948); "Namelessness"; "Necromancy" (Jan 1934); "Nemea" (Némée); "The Nemesis of Suns" (1912); "Neptune"; "The Nereid" (12 Jan 1913); "Nero" (1912); "Nevermore" (1971); "The Nevermore-To-Be" (1971); "Night" (Noche); "Night" (The) (1970); "Night" (Twilight); "The Night Forest" (1912); "Night of Miletus" (1971); "Nightfall" (1924); "Nightmare" (1922); "Nightmare of the Lilliputian" (1958); "The Nightmare Tarn" (Nov 1929); "Nirvana" (1912); "'No more the pine'"; "No Stranger Dream" (1958); "Nocturnal Pines" (1971); "Nocturne" (Sep 1912); "Nocturne: Grant Avenue" (1962); "The Noon of the Seasons" (1970); ""Not Altogether Sleep"" (1951); "Not Theirs the Cypress-Arch" (1951); "November" (1971); "November Twilight" (1922); "Nuns Walking in the Orchard" (1971); "Nyctalops" (Oct 1929); "The Nymph" (1971); "Golden-Tongued Romance" (1951); "Oblivion" (L’Oubli) (1951); "Obsession" (LXXXI. Obsession) (1925); "October" (May 1935); "Ode" (O) (3 Dec 1925); "Ode" (Your); "Ode on Imagination" (1912); "Ode to Light" (1974); "Ode to Matter" (1970); "Ode to Music" (1912); "Ode to Peace"; "Ode to the Abyss" (3 May 1911); "Odysseus in Eternity" (1971); "Old Hydraulic Diggings" (1971); "Old Limestone Kiln" (1971); "An Old theme" (1971); "The Old Water-Wheel" (1951); "Omniety" (1944); "On a Broken Statue" (Sur un Marbre brisé); "On A Chinese Vase" (1971); "On Re-Reading Baudelaire" (13 Dec 1923); "On "Tasso in Prison" by Eugène Delacroix" (CI. Sur Le Tasse en Prison d’Eugène Delacroix); "On the Canyon-Side" (27 Sep 1923); "On the Mount of Stone" (1971); "One Evening" (1971); "Only to One Returned" (1958); "The Orchid of Beauty" (1922); "Ougabalys" (15 Sep 1929); "The Outer Land" (26 May 1935); "Outlanders" (Jul 1937); "The Owls" (LXIX. Les Hiboux) (1 Oct 1925); "Paean" (1962); "The Pagan" (1958); "A Pagan's Prayer" (LXXXVI. La Prière d’un païen); "The Pageant of Music" (1970); "The Palace of Jewels" (1970); "Palms" (Apr 1920); "Paphnutius" (1958); "A Parisian Dream" (CXXVI. Rêve parisien) (1925); "Parnassus À La Mode" (1958); "Passing of An Elder God" (1958); "Pastel" (Pastel); "Paysage" (CVIII. Paysage); "Un Paysage Paîen" (1971); "Perseus And Medusa" (1958); "Les Petites Vieilles" (CXV. Les Petites Vieilles); "Phallus Impudica" (1971); "A Phantasy of Twilight" (1975); "The Phantom" (LXV. Le Revenant) (1971); "Philtre" (1958); "The Phoenix" (1958); "Picture by Piero Di Cosimo" (1971); "Pine Needles" (1912); "La Pipe" (LXX. La Pipe); "Plague from the Abatoir [sic]" (1971); "Plaisir d'Amour" (Plaisir d’Amour); "Plum-Flowers" (Mar 1924); "Poet in A Barroom" (1971); "The Poet Talks with the Biographers" (1951); "Poets in Hades" (1971); "The Poison" (L. Le Poison) (1971); "Pool At Lobos" (1971); "Poplars" (1973); "The Possessed" (XXXVIII. Le Possédé); "Postlude" (1962); "The Potion of Dreams" (1975); "Pour Chercher Du Nouveau" (1949); "The Power of Eld" (1970); "A Prayer" (1971); "A Precept" (1922); "Preface" (Preface); "The Price" (1912); "Prisoner in Vain" (1971); "De Profundis clamavi" (XXXI. De profundis clamavi) (1971); "The Prophet Speaks" (Sep 1938); "Psalm" (1922); "Psalm" (From - Ebony And Crystal); "A Psalm to the Best Beloved" (1922); "Psalm to the Desert" (1915); "The Pursuer" (Nov 1957); "Query" (1925); "Quest" (1922); "Quiddity" (1958); "La Rançon" (XCVIII. La Rançon); "The Rebel" (XCV. Le Rebelle); "Reclamation" (1973); "Recompense" (1922); "Refuge" (1971); "The Refuge of Beauty" (1918); "Reigning Empress" (1971); "Remember Thee"; "Remembered Light" (Dec 1912); "Remembrance" (17 Jan 1924); "The Remorse of the Dead" (XXXIV. Remords Posthume) (Apr 1925); "Requiescat" (1922); "Requiescat in Pace" (M.L.M.) (May 1920); "Resurrection" (Jul 1947); "The Retribution" (1912); "Retrospect And Forecast" (1912); "The Return of Hyperion" (1912); "La Rêve d'un curieux" (CL. Le Rêve d’un curieux); "Rêve Parisian"; "Revenant" (Jul 1933); "Reverie in August" (1962); "Réversibilité" (XLV. Réversibilité); "Rhythm" (Ritmo); "Ripe Mulberries"; "The River of Life"; "River-Canyon" (1971); "Rosa Mystica" (1922); "Rubaiyat of Saiyed; "Rustic Life" (Vida aldeana); "Said the Dreamer" (1958); "The Samurai" (Le Samouraï); "Sandalwood" (1937); "Satan Unrepentant" (Oct 1912); "Satiety" (A) (1971); "Satiety" (Dear) (1922); "Saturn" (1912); "Saturnian Cinema" (1976); "The Saturnienne" (Dec 1925); "School-Room Pastime" (1971); "The Sciapod" (1958); "Sea Cycle" (1962); "The Sea-Gods" (21 Jun 1923); "Sea-Memory" (1971); "The Secret" (19 Apr 1923); "Secret Love" (1958); "Sed non Satiata" (XXVII. Sed non Satiata) (1949); "Sed non Satiata" (XXVII. Sed non Satiata) (O); "Seeker" (1951); "Seer of the Cycles" (1976); "Selenique" (26 Jul 1923); "Semblance" (12 Apr 1923); "Semper Eadem" (XLI. Semper Eadem) (1925); "Les Sept Vieillards" (CXIV. Les Sept Vieillards); "September" (11 Sep 1929); "Sepulture" (Oct 1918); "Sépulture" (LXXII. Sépulture); "Le Serpent qui danse" (XXIX. Le Serpent qui Danse); "Sestet" (1971); "A Setting Sun" (Soleil couchant); "Shadow of Nightmare" (1912); "The Shadow of the Unattained"; "Shadows" (12 Sep 1929); "Ye Shall Return" (1951); "Shapes in the Sunset" (1951); "The Sick Muse" (VII. La Muse Malade) (1925); "A Sierran Sunrise" (1970); "The Sierras" (Sep 1910); "Siesta" (Sieste); "Silent Hour" (1962); "Sinbad, It Was Not Well to Brag" (1951); "Sisina" (LX. Sisina); "Slaughter-House in Spring"; "Slaughter-House Pasture" (1971); "The Sleep of the Cayman" (El sueño del caimán); "The Sleep of the Condor" (1971); "The Sleep of the Condor" (Le Sommeil du condor); "Snake, Owl, Cat or Hawk" (1971); "The Snow-Blossoms" (1912); "Snowfall on Acacia" (1971); "Soliloquy in An Ebon tower" (1951); "Solution" (1922); "Solvet Seclum" (Solvet seclum); "Some Blind Eidolon" (23 Mar 1942); "Someone" (1971); "Somnus" (1971); "Song" ([Chanson]); "Song" (I) (1922); "Song" (Rappelle-toi); "Song" (Vagrant) (31 May 1923); "Song At Evenfall" (1930); "A Song from Hell" (1975); "Song from Les Uns et Les Autres" ([Song from] Les Uns et les autres); "Song of Autumn" (LVII. Chant d’automne) (1958); "The Song of Aviol" (5 Apr 1923); "The Song of Cartha" (3 May 1923); "The Song of A Comet" (1912); "A Song of Dreams" (1912); "Song of Sappho's Arabian Daughter" (Feb 1919); "The Song of Songs" (El Cantar de los Cantares); "Song of the Necromancer" (1937); "The Song of the Stars" (1912); "The Song of the Worlds" (1975); "Song to Oblivion" (1912); "Sonnet" (Bois sacré); "Sonnet" (Empress) (1962); "Sonnet" (Green) (1962); "Sonnet" (How) (1971); "Sonnet d'automne" (LXVI. Sonnet d’automne); "Sonnet for the Psychoanalysts" (1951); "The Sorcerer to His Love" (16 Nov 1941); "The Sorrow of the Winds" (Dec 1912); "The Soul of the Sea" (1912); "Souvenance" (1976); "The Sower" (Rimas LX); "The Sparrow's Nest" (1958); "Spectral Life" (1971); "Sphinx And Medusa" (1975); "The Sphinx of the infinite" (1973); "The Spiritual Dawn" (XLVII. L’Aube Spirituelle) (1925); "Spleen" (LXXIX. Spleen); "Spleen" (LXXVII. Spleen); "Spleen" (LXXVIII. Spleen); "Spleen" (LXXX. Spleen) (Feb 1926); "Spleen" (Spleen); "Spring Nunnery" (1971); "The Stained Window" (Vitrail); "The Star-Treader" (Oct 1911); "Storm's End" (1971); "Stormy Afterglow" (1971); "Strange Girl" (1971); "Strangeness" (3 Oct 1916); "The Stylite" (1951); "Sufficiency" (1971); "Suggestion" (1973); "The Summer Moon" (1912); "The Sun" (CIX. Le Soleil); "The Suns And the Void" (1974); "A Sunset" (As) (1912); "A Sunset" (Far); "Sunset Over Farm-Land" (1971); "Supplication" (1962); "Surrealist Sonnet" (1951); "Symbols" (1922); "Sympathetic Horror" (LXXXIII. Horreur sympathique) (1925); "The Tartarus of the Suns" (1970); "The Tears of Lilith" (26 Apr 1917); "Temporality" (13 Apr 1928); "The Temptation"; "Tempus" (1971); ""That Last infirmity"" (1971); ""That Motley Drama"" (1958); "Thebaid" (1958); "The Thralls of Circe Climb Parnassus" (1971); "The Throne of Winter" (1976); "Tin Can on the Mountain-Top" (1971); "Tired Gardener" (1958); "The Titans in Tartarus" (1974); "The Titans Triumphant"; "To a Creole Lady" (LXIII. A une Dame créole); "To a Malabaress" (XCII. A une Malabaraise); "To a Northern Venus"; "To a Passer-by" (CXVII. A une Passante); "To a Woman" (A une femme); "To Antares" (25 Aug 1927); "To Beauty" (1971); "To George Sterling" (Deep) (1970); "To George Sterling" (High) (1910); "To George Sterling" (His) (1970); "To George Sterling" (What) (1970); "To George Sterling: A Valediction" (Dec 1926); "To Her Who Is Too Gay" (III. A celle qui est trop gaie); "To Howard Phillips Lovecraft" (31 Mar 1937); "To A Mariposa Lily" (1976); "To Nora May French" (I) (Jul 1920); "To Nora May French" (II) (1971); "To Omar Khayyam" (13 Dec 1919); "To One Absent" (1962); "To the Beloved" (1922); "To the Chimera" (1922); "To the Daemon of Sublimity" (1963); "To the Darkness" (1912); "To the Morning Star" (1976); "To the Nightshade" (1970); "To the Sun" (1912); "To Theodore de Banville" (XVI. A Théodore de Banville); "To Whom It May Concern" (1971); "The Toiling Skeleton" (CXVIII. Le Squelette laboureur); "Tolometh" (1958); "Touch" (1971); "Tout entière" (XLII. Tout Entière); "Town Lights" (1971); "Transcendence" (1922); "Transmutation" (31 Jan 1924); "Travelling Gypsies" (XIII. Bohémiens en Voyage); "Triple Aspect" (1922); "Tristan to Iseult" (1971); "Tristesses de la lune" (LXVII. Tristesses de la lune); "Trope" (1971); "Tryst At Lobos" (1971); "Twilight" (Crépuscule); "The Twilight of the Gods" (1951); "Twilight on the Snow" (1922); "Twilight Song" (1962); "The Twilight Woods" (1976); "The Two Kind Sisters" (CXXXVII. Les Deux Bonnes Soeurs) (1971); "Two Myths And A Fable" (1951); "The Unfinished Quest" (1977); "Unicorn" (1958); "Union" (1922); "The Unmerciful Mistress" (1977); "The Unremembered" (1912); "[Untitled]" (Love); "Untold Arabian Fable" (1958); "Uriel"; "A Valediction" (9 Aug 1923); "The Vampire" (XXXII. Le Vampire); "Vaticinations" (1971); "Venus" (1971); "Vers pour le portrait d'Honoré Daumier" (LXI. Vers pour le portrait d’Honoré Daumier); "Very Far from Here" (XCIX. Bien loin d’ici); "Une Vie Spectrale" (1971); "A Vision of Lucifer" (1922); "The Voice" (XCIII. La Voix) (1971); "The Voice in the Pines"; "The Voice of Silence" (1970); "The Voyage" (CLI. Le Voyage); "Un Voyage à Cythère" (CXLI. Un Voyage à Cythère); "Un Voyage à Cythère" (CXLI. Un Voyage à Cythère) (My); "Vultures Come to the Ambarvalia" (1971); "The Waning Moon" (1976); "Warning" (3 Mar 1928); "Water-Fight" (1971); "Water-Hemlock" (1971); "We Shall Meet" (I) (26 Apr 1923); "We Shall Meet" (II); "Weavings" (1970); "What One Hears on the Mountain" (Ce qu’on entend sur la montagne); "The Wheel of Omphale" (Le Rouet d’Omphale) (1971); "Where?" (Rimas XXXVIII) (1958); "The Whisper of the Worm" (1971); "White Death" (1912); "Willow-Cutting in Autumn" (1958); "The Wind And the Moon" (1912); "Wind-Ripples" (6 Oct 1911); "The Wind-Threnody" (1977); "Windows At Lamplighting Time" (1971); "The Winds" (1912); "The Wine of Lovers" (CXXXII. Le Vin des Amants) (1925); "Wine of Summer" (1971); "The Wine of the Assassin" (CXXX. Le Vin de l’assassin); "The Wine of the Rag-Pickers" (CXXIX. Le Vin de chiffonniers); "The Wine of the Solitary" (CXXXI. Le Vin du solitaire); "The Wingless Archangels" (28 Jun 1923); "Wings of Perfume" (1976); "Winter Midnight" (II) (1976); "Winter Moonlight" (I) (1922); "Winter Moonlight" (The) (1922); "Witch Dance" (1941); "The Witch in the Graveyard" (1922); "The Witch with Eyes of Amber" (1923); "Wizard's Love" (1962); "Wizard's Love" (Latter manuscript version); "A Woman at Prayer" (Celle qui prie); "The World"; "The World Rolls On" (Rimas I (Libro de los gorriones)); "The Years Restored" (1975); "Yerba Buena" (1962); "You Are Not Beautiful" (20 Dec 1923); "Zothique" (1951); "Zuleika: An Oriental Song"; "(CXXIII)"; "(CXXIV)"; "(V)"; "(XL)"; "(XLIII)"; "(XXV)"; "(XXVI)"; "(XXVIII)"; "(XXXIII)"

=== Collections ===
- The Star-Treader and Other Poems (A.M. Robertson, 1912)
- Odes and Sonnets (The Book Club of California, 1918)
- Ebony and Crystal (Auburn Journal, 1922)
- Sandalwood (Auburn Journal, 1925)
- Nero and Other Poems (Futile Press, 1937)
- The Dark Chateau (Arkham House, 1951)
- Spells and Philtres (Arkham House, 1958)
- Poems in Prose (Arkham House, 1965)
- Selected Poems (Arkham House, 1971)

== See also ==
- As It Is Written – a novel mistakenly republished under Smith's name
