= The Abominations of Yondo =

1960 short stories collection by Clark Ashton Smith

- Dust-jacket by Ronald Clyne and Wynn Bullock for The Abominations of Yondo by Clark Ashton Smith
- Author: Clark Ashton Smith
- Cover artist: Ronald Clyne and Wynn Bullock
- Language: English
- Genre: Fantasy, horror, science fiction
- Publisher: Arkham House
- Publication date: 1960
- Publication place: United States
- Media type: Print (hardback)
- Pages: 227

The Abominations of Yondo is a collection of fantasy, horror and science fiction short stories by American writer Clark Ashton Smith. It was released in 1960 and was the author's fourth collection of stories published by Arkham House. It was released in an edition of 2,005 copies. The stories were mostly written between 1930 and 1935.

The collection contains stories from Smith's major story cycles of Hyperborea, Poseidonis, Averoigne and Zothique.

The title story is told by a man who has been released from being tortured by the priests of the lion-headed god Ong, and who tries to make his way to safety through the desert of Yondo, but is so perturbed by the horrors he encounters that he flees back to the realm of the torturers.

== Contents ==
The Abominations of Yondo contains the following tales:

- "The Abominations of Yondo"
- "The White Sybil"
- "The Ice-Demon"
- "The Voyage of King Euvoran"
- "The Witchcraft of Ulua"
- "The Master of the Crabs"
- "A Vintage from Atlantis"
- "The Enchantress of Sylaire"
- "The Dweller in the Gulf"
- "The Dark Age"
- "The Devotee of Evil"
- "The Nameless Offspring"
- "The Epiphany of Death"
- "The Third Episode of Vathek" with William Beckford
- "Chinoiserie"
- "The Mirror in the Hall of Ebony"
- "The Passing of Aphrodite"

== Reprints ==
- Jersey, Channel Islands: Neville Spearman, 1972.
- St. Albans, UK: Panther, 1974.

== See also ==
- Clark Ashton Smith bibliography

== Sources ==
- Jaffery, Sheldon (1989). The Arkham House Companion. Mercer Island, WA: Starmont House, Inc. p. 53. ISBN 1-55742-005-X.
- Chalker, Jack L.; Mark Owings (1998). The Science-Fantasy Publishers: A Bibliographic History, 1923-1998. Westminster, MD and Baltimore: Mirage Press, Ltd. pp. 36–37.
- Joshi, S.T. (1999). Sixty Years of Arkham House: A History and Bibliography. Sauk City, WI: Arkham House. p. 68. ISBN 0-87054-176-5.
- Nielsen, Leon (2004). Arkham House Books: A Collector's Guide. Jefferson, NC and London: McFarland & Company, Inc. p. 80. ISBN 0-7864-1785-4.
