= Tales of Science and Sorcery =

1964 collection of stories by Clark Ashton Smith

- Dust-jacket illustration by Frank Utpatel for Tales of Science and Sorcery
- Author: Clark Ashton Smith
- Cover artist: Frank Utpatel
- Language: English
- Genre: Fantasy, horror, science fiction
- Publisher: Arkham House
- Publication date: 1964
- Publication place: United States
- Media type: Print (hardback)
- Pages: 256

Tales of Science and Sorcery is a collection of stories by American writer Clark Ashton Smith. It was released in 1964 and was the author's fifth collection of stories published by Arkham House. It was released in an edition of 2,482 copies. The stories were originally published between 1930 and 1958 in Weird Tales and other pulp magazines.

The collection contains stories from Smith's major story cycles of Hyperborea, Averoigne and Zothique.

== Contents ==
Tales of Science and Sorcery contains the following stories:

- "Clark Ashton Smith: A Memoir", by E. Hoffmann Price
- "Master of the Asteroid"
- "The Seed from the Sepulchre"
- "The Root of Ampoi"
- "The Immortals of Mercury"
- "Murder in the Fourth Dimension"
- "Seedling of Mars" (after a plot by E. M. Johnson)
- "The Maker of Gargoyles"
- "The Great God Awto"
- "Mother of Toads"
- "The Tomb-Spawn"
- "Schizoid Creator"
- "Symposium of the Gorgon"
- "The Theft of the Thirty-Nine Girdles"
- "Morthylla"

== Reprints ==
- St. Albans, UK: Panther, 1976.

== See also ==
- Clark Ashton Smith bibliography

== Sources ==
- Jaffery, Sheldon (1989). The Arkham House Companion. Mercer Island, WA: Starmont House, Inc. pp. 75–76. ISBN 1-55742-005-X.
- Chalker, Jack L.; Mark Owings (1998). The Science-Fantasy Publishers: A Bibliographic History, 1923-1998. Westminster, MD and Baltimore: Mirage Press, Ltd. p. 42.
- Joshi, S.T. (1999). Sixty Years of Arkham House: A History and Bibliography. Sauk City, WI: Arkham House. p. 87. ISBN 0-87054-176-5.
- Nielsen, Leon (2004). Arkham House Books: A Collector's Guide. Jefferson, NC and London: McFarland & Company, Inc. pp. 92–93. ISBN 0-7864-1785-4.
