= Spells and Philtres =

1958 poetry collection by Clark Ashton Smith

- Jacket illustration by Frank Utpatel for Spells and Philtres
- Author: Clark Ashton Smith
- Cover artist: Frank Utpatel
- Language: English
- Genre: poetry
- Publisher: Arkham House
- Publication date: 1958
- Publication place: United States
- Media type: Print (Hardback)
- Pages: 54

Spells and Philtres is a collection of poems by Clark Ashton Smith. It was released in 1958 and was the author's fifth book and second collection of poetry to be published by Arkham House. It was released in an edition of 519 copies. The book was a second stop-gap volume following The Dark Chateau. It represented Smith's poetry while the more extensive Selected Poems was being prepared which did not ultimately appear until 1971. The collection also includes several translations of French and Spanish poems. Clérigo Herrero, however, is not a real person and the poem is actually a composition of Smith's.

== Contents ==
Spells and Philtres contains the following poems:

- "Dedication"
- "Didus Ineptus"
- "Thebaid"
- "Secret Love"
- "The Pagan"
- "Tired Gardener"
- "Nada"
- "High Surf"
- "The Centaur"
- "Said the Dreamer"
- "The Nameless Wraith"
- "The Blindness of Orion"
- "Jungle Twilight"
- "The Phoenix"
- "The Prophet Speaks"
- "Farewell to Eros"
- "Alternative"
- "Only to One Returned"
- "Anteros"
- "No Stranger Dream"
- "Do you Forget, Enchantress?"
- "Necromancy"
- "Dialogue"
- "October"
- "Dominion"
- "Tolometh"
- "Disillusionment"
- "Almost Anything"
- "Parnassus a la Mode"
- "Fence and Wall"
- "Growth of Lichen"
- "Cats in Winter Sunlight"
- "Abandoned Plum-Orchard"
- "Harvest Evening"
- "Willow-Cutting in Autumn"
- "Late Pear-Pruner"
- "Geese in the Spring Night"
- "The Sparrow's Nest"
- "The Last Apricot"
- "Unicorn"
- "Untold Arabian Fable"
- "A Hunter Meets the Mantichoras"
- "The Sciapod"
- "The Monacle"
- "Feast of St. Anthony"
- "Paphnutios"
- "Philter"
- "Perseus and Medusa"
- "Essence"
- "Passing of an Elder God"
- "Nightmare of the Lilliputian"
- "Mithridates"
- "Quiddity"
- "'That Motley Drama'" (from Clérigo Herrero)
- "Rimas XXXIII" (from Gustavo Adolfo Bécquer)
- "Ecclesiastes" (from Charles-Marie-René Leconte de Lisle)
- "Anterior Life" (from Charles Baudelaire)
- "Song of Autumn" (from Charles Baudelaire)
- "Lethe" (from Charles Baudelaire)
- "The Metamorphoses of the Vampire" (from Charles Baudelaire)
- "Epigrams and Apothegms"

== See also ==
- Clark Ashton Smith bibliography

== Sources ==
- Jaffery, Sheldon (1989). The Arkham House Companion. Mercer Island, WA: Starmont House, Inc. pp. 47–48. ISBN 1-55742-005-X.
- Chalker, Jack L.; Mark Owings (1998). The Science-Fantasy Publishers: A Bibliographic History, 1923-1998. Westminster, MD and Baltimore: Mirage Press, Ltd. p. 35.
- Joshi, S.T. (1999). Sixty Years of Arkham House: A History and Bibliography. Sauk City, WI: Arkham House. pp. 63–65. ISBN 0-87054-176-5.
- Nielsen, Leon (2004). Arkham House Books: A Collector's Guide. Jefferson, NC and London: McFarland & Company, Inc. pp. 77–78. ISBN 0-7864-1785-4.
