= Poems in Prose (Smith collection) =

1965 illustrated collection of prose poems by Clark Ashton Smith

- Jacket illustration by Frank Utpatel for Poems in Prose
- Editor: Donald Sidney-Fryer
- Author: Clark Ashton Smith
- Illustrator: Frank Utpatel
- Cover artist: Frank Utpatel
- Language: English
- Genre: Prose poetry
- Publisher: Arkham House
- Publication date: 1965
- Publication place: United States
- Media type: Print (Hardback)
- Pages: xxiv, 54

Poems in Prose is an illustrated collection of prose poems by Clark Ashton Smith, edited by Donald Sidney-Fryer. It was released in 1965 and was published by Arkham House in an edition of 1,016 copies. The book is a nearly complete collection of Smith's prose poetry. French editor and critic Philippe Gindre called the book "the magnificent Poems in Prose."

== Contents ==
Poems in Prose contains the following poems:

- "Clark Ashton Smith, Poet in Prose", by Donald S. Fryer
- "The Traveller"
- "The Flower-Devil"
- Images
  - "Tears"
  - "The Secret Rose"
  - "The Wind and the Garden"
  - "Offerings"
  - "A Coronal"
- "The Black Lake"
- Vignettes
  - "Beyond the Mountains"
  - "The Broken Lute"
  - "Nostalgia of the Unknown"
  - "Grey Sorrow"
  - "The Hair of Circe"
  - "The Eyes of Circe"
- "A Dream of Lethe"
- "The Caravan"
- "The Princess Almeena"
- "Ennui"
- "The Statue of Silence"
- "Remoteness"
- "The Memnons of the Night"
- "The Garden and the Tomb"
- "In Cocaigne"
- "The Litany of the Seven Kisses"
- "From a Letter"
- "From the Crypts of Memory"
- "A Phantasy"
- "The Demon, the Angel, and the Beauty"
- "The Shadows"
- "The Crystals"
- "Chinoiserie"
- "The Mirror in the Hall of Ebony"
- "The Muse of Hyperborea"
- "The Lotus and the Moon"
- "The Passing of Aphrodite"
- "To the Daemon"
- "The Forbidden Forest"
- "The Mithridate"
- "Narcissus"
- "The Peril That Lurks Among the Ruins"
- "The Abomination of Desolation"
- "The Touchstone"
- "The Image of Bronze and the Image of Iron"
- "The Corpse and the Skeleton"
- "The Sun and the Sepulchre"
- "Sadastor"

== Sources ==
- Jaffery, Sheldon (1989). The Arkham House Companion. Mercer Island, WA: Starmont House, Inc. p. 78. ISBN 1-55742-005-X.
- Chalker, Jack L.; Mark Owings (1998). The Science-Fantasy Publishers: A Bibliographic History, 1923-1998. Westminster, MD and Baltimore: Mirage Press, Ltd. p. 42.
- Joshi, S.T. (1999). Sixty Years of Arkham House: A History and Bibliography. Sauk City, WI: Arkham House. pp. 89–90. ISBN 0-87054-176-5.
- Nielsen, Leon (2004). Arkham House Books: A Collector's Guide. Jefferson, NC and London: McFarland & Company, Inc. pp. 94–95. ISBN 0-7864-1785-4.
