= Other Dimensions =

1970 collection of stories by Clark Ashton Smith

- Dust-jacket illustration by Lee Brown Coye for Other Dimensions
- Editor: Donald Sidney-Fryer (uncredited)
- Author: Clark Ashton Smith
- Cover artist: Lee Brown Coye
- Language: English
- Genre: Fantasy, horror, science fiction
- Publisher: Arkham House
- Publication date: 1970
- Publication place: United States
- Media type: Print (hardback)
- Pages: 329

Other Dimensions is a collection of 26 stories by American writer Clark Ashton Smith, edited by Donald Sidney-Fryer. It was released in 1970 and was the author's sixth collection of stories published by Arkham House. It was released in an edition of 3,144 copies. The stories were originally published between 1910 and 1953 in Weird Tales and other pulp magazines.

== Editorial process ==
After the success of the Clark Ashton Smith anthology Poems in Prose, edited by Donald Sidney-Fryer and published by Arkham House in 1965, the editor suggested to publisher August Derleth a successor project, a collection of all known uncollected stories by Smith. Sidney-Fryer explained:

Once more Derleth approved the idea, and as I had already gathered copies of all the stories required, I began typing the MS. at once. However, I had achieved perhaps only one-third of it, when non-literary difficulties arose in my personal life (during the latter 1960s), making it, if not impossible, extremely awkward for me to continue and finish it. Therefore I applied to Margo Skinner, who regularly typed the MSS. of Fritz Leiber for him, to finish the job for me--which she did; and although I offered to pay her, she refused any recompense, knowing as she did my impecunious condition. Wow, what a benevolent gesture! I proofed the stories against their magazine appearances and mailed the MS. of what became Other Dimensions off to Derleth . . ."

For unknown reasons, Sidney-Fryer was not credited as editor in the published book.

== Critical response ==
Publisher Derleth reviewed the book in his "Books of the Times" newspaper column without disclosing that he was its publisher. After discussing Smith's reputation, Derleth wrote: "Other Dimensions--while it does not contain stories of the stature of those that appeared in [Smith's] initial books of weird tales--offers all the stories that have until now remained uncollected--26 of them, none of major stature, but all of prime interest to collectors in the domain of the offtrail and unusual." He continued: "The stories range from science-fiction to horror and fantasy; in each of these three branches of fantasy Smith excelled, and though these tales may not rank with previously published work, they are still appreciably superior to much of currently published fantasy."

== Contents ==
Other Dimensions contains the following tales:

- "Marooned in Andromeda"
- "The Amazing Planet"
- "An Adventure in Futurity"
- "The Immeasurable Horror"
- "The Invisible City"
- "The Dimension of Chance"
- "The Metamorphosis of Earth"
- "Phoenix"
- "The Necromantic Tale"
- "The Venus of Azombeii"
- "The Resurrection of the Rattlesnake"
- "The Supernumerary Corpse"
- "The Mandrakes"
- "Thirteen Phantasms"
- "An Offering to the Moon"
- "Monsters in the Night"
- "The Malay Krise"
- "The Ghost of Mohammed Din"
- "The Mahout/ The Raja and the Tiger"
- "Something New"
- "The Justice of the Elephant"
- "The Kiss of Zoraida"
- "A Tale of Sir John Maundeville"
- "The Ghoul"
- "Told in the Desert"

== See also ==
- Clark Ashton Smith bibliography

== Sources ==
- Jaffery, Sheldon (1989). The Arkham House Companion. Mercer Island, WA: Starmont House, Inc. p. 95. ISBN 1-55742-005-X.
- Chalker, Jack L.; Mark Owings (1998). The Science-Fantasy Publishers: A Bibliographic History, 1923-1998. Westminster, MD and Baltimore: Mirage Press, Ltd. pp. 45–46.
- Joshi, S.T. (1999). Sixty Years of Arkham House: A History and Bibliography. Sauk City, WI: Arkham House. pp. 107–108. ISBN 0-87054-176-5.
- Nielsen, Leon (2004). Arkham House Books: A Collector's Guide. Jefferson, NC and London: McFarland & Company, Inc. p. 106. ISBN 0-7864-1785-4.
