= The Dark Chateau =

1951 collection of poems by Clark Ashton Smith

- Jacket illustration by Frank Utpatel for The Dark Chateau
- Author: Clark Ashton Smith
- Cover artist: Frank Utpatel
- Language: English
- Genre: poetry
- Publisher: Arkham House
- Publication date: 1951
- Publication place: United States
- Media type: Print (Hardback)
- Pages: 63

The Dark Chateau is a collection of poems by American writer Clark Ashton Smith. It was released in 1951 and was the author's fourth book to be published by Arkham House. It was released in an edition of 563 copies. The book was intended to be a stop-gap volume representing Smith's poetry while the more extensive Selected Poems was being prepared, although Selected Poems did not ultimately appear until 1971.

== Contents ==
The Dark Chateau contains the following poems:

- "Amithaine"
- "Seeker"
- "The Dark Chateau"
- "Lamia"
- "Pour Chercher du Nouveau"
- "'O Golden-Tongued Romance'"
- "Averoigne"
- "Zothique"
- "The Stylite"
- "Dominium in Excelsis"
- "Moly"
- "Two Myths and a Fable"
- "Eros of Ebony"
- "Shapes in the Sunset"
- "Not Theirs the Cypress-Arch"
- "Don Quixote on Market Street"
- "Malediction"
- "Hellenic Sequel"
- "The Cypress"
- "The Old Water-Wheel"
- "Calenture"
- "Soliloquy in an Ebon Tower"
- "Sinbad, It Was Not Well to Brag"
- "Sonnet for the Psychoanalysts"
- "Surrealists Sonnet"
- "The Twilight of the Gods"
- "The Poet Talks With the Biographers"
- "Desert Dwellers"
- "Hesperian Fal"
- "'Not Altogether Sleep'"
- "Some Blind Eidolon"
- "The Isle of Saturn"
- "Oblivion"
- "Revenant"
- "In Slumber"
- "Cambion"
- "The Witch With Eyes of Amber"
- "The Outer Land"
- "Luna Aeternalis"
- "Ye Shall Return"

== See also ==
- Clark Ashton Smith bibliography

== Sources ==
- Jaffery, Sheldon (1989). The Arkham House Companion. Mercer Island, WA: Starmont House, Inc. p. 41. ISBN 1-55742-005-X.
- Chalker, Jack L.; Mark Owings (1998). The Science-Fantasy Publishers: A Bibliographic History, 1923-1998. Westminster, MD and Baltimore: Mirage Press, Ltd. p. 34.
- Joshi, S.T. (1999). Sixty Years of Arkham House: A History and Bibliography. Sauk City, WI: Arkham House. pp. 57–58. ISBN 0-87054-176-5.
- Nielsen, Leon (2004). Arkham House Books: A Collector's Guide. Jefferson, NC and London: McFarland & Company, Inc. pp. 73–74. ISBN 0-7864-1785-4.
