= The Return of the Sorcerer =

1931 Short horror story

"The Return of the Sorcerer" is a horror short story by American writer Clark Ashton Smith, first published in Strange Tales of Mystery and Terror in September 1931. The story ties into H. P. Lovecraft's Cthulhu Mythos due to its references to Lovecraft's invented book of occult lore the Necronomicon. It tells of one Mr. Ogden being hired by scholarly recluse John Carnby to translate passages from the Necronomicon.

== Plot Synopsis ==
After a down-on-his-luck scholar takes a job as a live-in secretary, translator, and general assistant to an elderly occultist, John Carnby, he begins to experience a sense of deep unease. Strange noises in the night disturb his sleep and the obvious state of fear in which his employer lives only enhance this feeling.

Soon, events cause the occultist to divulge the fact that he and his brother were both dark magicians before he killed his more-powerful twin, and that the noises are his sibling's dismembered body parts returning to drive the man insane with terror before murdering him. He further reveals that he brought the other man into his home in an effort to find a way to banish his brother's restless spirit.

The story culminates with the various body parts of the dead sorcerer rejoining themselves, then killing his treacherous brother and dismembering the corpse with the same tools that were used upon.

== Critical response ==
According to The Complete H.P. Lovecraft Filmography, "The Return of the Sorcerer" is the first published story by a writer other than Lovecraft to adopt the Cthulhu cosmology. It is the title story of Robert Weinberg's collection of Smith's short fiction, The Return of the Sorcerer: The Best of Clark Ashton Smith.

In a review of the August Derleth anthology Sleep No More, New York Times reviewer Orvile Prescott commented that the story "skates perilously close to parody of its own genre" but "should upset even hardened stomachs." A New York Times review of Out of Space and Time praised "The Return of the Sorcerer" as one of the best stories in the volume, "partly because it is one of the least overwritten". Jason Colavito singled it out in his horror genre study Knowing Fear as a standout amongst Smith's horror stories.

== Media adaptation ==
"The Return of the Sorcerer" was adapted as an episode of the television series Night Gallery starring Vincent Price (as John Carnby) and Bill Bixby (as Noel Evans in Mr. Ogden's role). It was also adapted for radio in an episode starring Tucker Smallwood and Ron Bottitta produced for the revival of the classic radio series Suspense, which premiered on Sirius XM Radio in November 2012.

In August 2010, Finnish progressive rock band Orne and Rochester-based doom metal band Blizaro released a split 7" record based on the Night Gallery episode.

In April 2018, Cadabra Records released a vinyl LP read by Anthony D.P. Mann and scored by composer Renato Zampieri (Seizon).
