= Poseidonis =

Fictional landmass

Map drawn by Tim Kirk.

Poseidonis is the fictional last remnant of the lost continent of Atlantis, mentioned by Algernon Blackwood in his novella "Sand" (published in 1912 in his collection Pan's Garden) and also detailed in a series of short stories by Clark Ashton Smith. Smith based Poseidonis on Theosophical scriptures about Atlantis (such as Secret Doctrine by Helena Blavatsky), and his concept of "the last isle of foundering Atlantis" is echoed by the isle of Númenor in J. R. R. Tolkien's legendarium.

== Stories in Smith's Poseidonis cycle ==
- "The Muse of Atlantis" (prose poem)
- "The Last Incantation"
- "The Death of Malygris"
- "Tolometh" (poem)
- "The Double Shadow"
- "A Voyage to Sfanomoë"
- "A Vintage from Atlantis"
- "Atlantis: a poem" (poem)

== Other writers ==
In the Pusadian series of short stories by L. Sprague de Camp, "Poseidonis" refers to the fictional lost island continent of Pusad, whose name was later corrupted to Poseidonis by the Greeks and whose fate was supposedly one basis for the Atlantis legend.

The 1929 Malay-language novel Drama dari Krakatau, about the Krakatoa eruption, depicts the origins of the Malay Archipelago from rising sea levels caused by the sinking of Poseidonis.

== See also ==
- Averoigne
- Hyperborean cycle
- Zothique
- Clark Ashton Smith bibliography
