= A Night in Malnéant =

"A Night in Malnéant" is a horror short story written by Clark Ashton Smith and originally published in 1933 in the short story collection The Double Shadow and Other Fantasies. The story would later be published in the September 1939 issue of Weird Tales.

== Plot ==
Our unnamed narrator is weary from his aimless wandering across the remote cities and roads of the old world. These wanderings began soon after the suicide of his wife Lady Mariel, which was caused by his cruel and vicious temper. He soon stumbles upon Malnéant, a city enveloped by fog and the sepulchral tolling of mortuary bells.

While roaming the mostly deserted streets, the townspeople all tell him they are preparing items for Lady Mariel's funeral. The tavern and inn he approaches both deny him entry, as all of Malnéant's accommodations and services have been appropriated for Lady Mariel's funeral. It's her funeral that is constantly being announced via the tolling of the mortuary bells. Despite the uncanny coincidence, our narrator refuses to suspect a connection to his late wife.

He eventually follows the townspeople into the cathedral, whereupon he is stunned to see that it truly is his Mariel lying dead within the coffin. Eventually, he leaves the church and immediately loses his way in the labyrinthine city. After hours of roaming, our narrator finally finds his way out of Malnéant.
