= Selected Poems (Smith collection) =

- Dust jacket by Gary Gore.
- Author: Clark Ashton Smith
- Cover artist: Gary Gore
- Language: English
- Genre: poetry
- Publisher: Arkham House
- Publication date: 1971
- Publication place: United States
- Media type: Print (Hardback)
- Pages: xx, 403

Selected Poems is a collection of poems by American writer Clark Ashton Smith. It was released in 1971 by Arkham House in an edition of 2,118 copies. The collection also includes several translations of French and Spanish poems. Christophe des Laurieres and Clérigo Herrero, however, are not real people, and the poems are actually compositions of Smith's.

== Contents ==
Selected Poems contains the following:

- "Clark Ashton Smith: Emperor of Shadows", by Benjamin DeCasseres
- The Star Treader
- Additional Poems
- Ebony and Crystal
- Sandalwood
- Translations and Paraphrases
- Incantations
- Quintrains
- Sestets
- Experiments in Haiku
- Satires and Travesties
- The Jasmine Girdle
- The Hill of Dionysus

== See also ==
- Clark Ashton Smith bibliography

== Sources ==
- Jaffery, Sheldon (1989). The Arkham House Companion. Mercer Island, WA: Starmont House, Inc. pp. 96–98. ISBN 1-55742-005-X.
- Chalker, Jack L.; Mark Owings (1998). The Science-Fantasy Publishers: A Bibliographic History, 1923-1998. Westminster, MD and Baltimore: Mirage Press, Ltd. pp. 46–48.
- Joshi, S.T. (1999). Sixty Years of Arkham House: A History and Bibliography. Sauk City, WI: Arkham House. pp. 110–121. ISBN 0-87054-176-5.
- Nielsen, Leon (2004). Arkham House Books: A Collector's Guide. Jefferson, NC and London: McFarland & Company, Inc. pp. 108–112. ISBN 0-7864-1785-4.
