= Hyperborean cycle =

Series of fantasy short stories by Clark Ashton Smith

The Hyperborean cycle is a series of short stories by Clark Ashton Smith that take place in the fictional prehistoric setting of Hyperborea. Smith's cycle takes cues from his friends, H. P. Lovecraft and Robert E. Howard and their works.

The cycle combines cosmic horror with an Iron Age setting. Adding to the peril is the rapidly approaching ice age, which threatens to wipe out all life on the Hyperborean continent. A host of deities play important roles in the cycle; foremost is the toad-god Tsathoggua, who dwells in Mount Voormithadreth.

Lovecraft wrote to Smith in a letter dated 3 December 1929: "I must not delay in expressing my well-nigh delirious delight at The Tale of Satampra Zeiros [Smith's short story]... [W]hat an atmosphere! I can see & feel & smell the jungle around immemorial Commoriom, which I am sure must lie buried today in glacial ice near Olathoe, in the Land of Lomar!". Soon afterward, Lovecraft included Smith's Tsathoggua (which originally appeared in "The Tale of Satampra Zeiros") in the story "The Mound", ghostwritten for Zealia Bishop in December 1929. Lovecraft also mentioned Tsathoggua in "The Whisperer in Darkness", which he began on February 24, 1930, and in "At the Mountains of Madness" a year later, along with the Hyperborean cities of Commoriom and Uzuldaroum.

Because Smith in turn borrowed numerous Lovecraftian elements, the cycle itself may be regarded as a branch of the Cthulhu Mythos. In a letter to August Derleth dated 26 July 1944, Smith wrote: "In common with other weird tales writers, I have ... made a few passing references (often under slightly altered names, such as Iog-Sotot for Yog-Sothoth and Kthulhut for Cthulhu) to some of the Lovecraftian deities. My Hyperborean tales, it seems to me, with their primordial, prehuman and sometimes premundane background and figures, are the closest to the Cthulhu Mythos, but most of them are written in a vein of grotesque humor that differentiates them vastly. However, such a tale as "The Coming of the White Worm" might be regarded as a direct contribution to the Mythos."

== Hyperborea ==
Hyperborea is a legendary continent in the Arctic. Before it was overwhelmed by the advancing ice sheets of the Pleistocene age, Hyperborea was a warm and fertile paradise, with lush jungles inhabited by the last remnants of the dinosaurs. A race of yeti-like bipeds, known as the Voormi, once populated Hyperborea, but were wiped out by the pre-human settlers who migrated here from the south. These pre-humans built the first capital of Hyperborea, at Commoriom. Later they moved to Uzuldaroum, when prophesies foretold of Commoriom's doom.

== Gods ==
=== Abhoth ===
[H]e described a sort of pool with a margin of mud that was marled with obscene offal; and in the pool a grayish, horrid mass that nearly choked it from rim to rim... Here, it seemed, was the ultimate source of all miscreation and abomination. For the gray mass quobbed and quivered, and swelled perpetually; and from it, in manifold fission, were spawned the anatomies that crept away on every side through the grotto. There were things like bodiless legs or arms that flailed in the slime, or heads that rolled, or floundering bellies with fishes' fins; and all manner of things malformed and monstrous, that grew in size as they departed from the neighborhood of Abhoth. And those that swam not swiftly ashore when they fell into the pool from Abhoth, were devoured by mouths that gaped in the parent bulk.
—Clark Ashton Smith, The Seven Geases

Abhoth ("The Source of Uncleanliness") is an Outer God or Great Old One who resides in the cavern of Y'quaa beneath Mount Voormithadreth. It is a horrid, dark gray protean mass and is said to be the ultimate source of all miscreation and abomination.

Obscene monsters constantly form in Abhoth's gray mass and crawl away from their parent. No two of Abhoth's children are alike. In general, they are complex life forms, but the majority of them are simple-minded, acting on impulse. Their forms can be anything from amorphous blobs and singular body parts to queer humanoids and monstrous mutants. Abhoth's tentacles and limbs grab many of them, pulling them back and devouring them. Most of those that escape simply wander off; only a few of them tend to their sire's needs. Abhoth has a twisted and cynical mind and can communicate telepathically with others near him.

Abhoth does not have any human worshippers, although an inhuman cult, known as the Unclean Ones, led by Yeb, is devoted to him.

The demon lord Juiblex in the Dungeons & Dragons role-playing game is likely derived from Abhoth. Abhoth is one of the Ancient Ones in the board game Arkham Horror. He is included in the Dunwich Horror expansion. Abhoth is also mentioned in Colin Wilson's The Mind Parasites.

=== Atlach-Nacha ===
In the short story The Seven Geases (1934), Atlach-Nacha is a Great Old One who is the reluctant recipient of a human sacrifice given to it by the toad-god Tsathoggua.

Atlach-Nacha resembles a huge spider with an almost-human face. It dwells within a huge cavern deep beneath Mount Voormithadreth, a mountain in the now vanished kingdom of Hyperborea in the Arctic. There it spins a gigantic web, bridging a massive chasm between the Dreamlands and the waking world. Some believe that when the web is complete, the end of the world will come, because it will create a permanent junction with the Dreamlands, allowing monsters to move freely into the waking world.

Atlach-Nacha probably came to Earth from the planet Cykranosh (or Saturn as we know it today) with Tsathoggua. Because of its appearance, Atlach-Nacha is often referred to as the Spider-God(dess) and is believed to be the regent of all spiders. Furthermore, the giant, bloated purple spiders of Leng are thought to be its children and servitors.

There is some disagreement about its gender. In Smith's original story, Atlach-Nacha is referred to as a male, but in later stories by other authors, it is implied to be a female.

=== Rlim Shaikorth ===
Rlim Shaikorth is a Great Old One or Lesser Old One (serves Aphoom-Zhah) who appears as a huge whitish worm with a gaping maw, and eyes made of dripping globules of blood, and is thus commonly known as the white worm. He travels on a gigantic iceberg called Yikilth, which it can guide across the ocean. In its colossal ice-citadel, the White Worm prowls the seas, blasting ships and inhabited land masses with extreme cold. Victims of the White Worm are frozen solid, their bodies appearing eerily white, and remain preternaturally cold—they will not melt nor warm even when exposed to fire. (The Coming of the White Worm, 1941)

=== Tsathoggua ===
See Tsathoggua.

=== Ubbo-Sathla ===
There, in the grey beginning of Earth, the formless mass that was Ubbo-Sathla reposed amid the slime and the vapors. Headless, without organs or members, it sloughed from its oozy sides, in a slow, ceaseless wave, the amoebic forms that were the archetypes of earthly life. Horrible it was, if there had been aught to apprehend the horror; and loathsome, if there had been any to feel loathing. About it, prone or tilted in the mire, there lay the mighty tablets of star-quarried stone that were writ with the inconceivable wisdom of the pre-mundane gods.
—Clark Ashton Smith, Ubbo-Sathla

Ubbo-Sathla ("The Unbegotten Source", "The Demiurge") is an Outer God who is described as a huge protoplasmic mass resting in a grotto deep beneath the frozen earth. The being is of a monstrous fecundity, spontaneously generating primordial single-celled organisms that pour unceasingly from its shapeless form. It guards a set of stone tablets believed to contain the knowledge of the Elder Gods.

Ubbo-Sathla is said to have spawned the prototypes of all forms of life on Earth, though whatever its pseudopods touch is forever devoid of life. Ubbo-Sathla is destined to someday reabsorb all living things on Earth.

Ubbo-Sathla is often regarded as a primal entity. Ubbo-Sathla is considered the “source” and “the unforgotten beginning” of the Great Old Ones, and is also regarded as the twin sibling of Azathoth.

Ubbo-Sathla probably dwells in gray-litten Y'qaa underneath Mount Voormithadreth, and likely have spawned another of its residents, the being Abhoth. Whose form and nature is very similar. This similarity has led some writers to speculate that Ubbo-Sathla and Abhoth are the same entity viewed at different epochs under different names. The tablets that Ubbo-Sathla guards have been oft sought by sorcerers, though no sorcerer has yet succeeded in acquiring them.

=== Yhoundeh ===
In Smith's The Door to Saturn, Yhoundeh the elk-goddess is the name of the deity worshipped in the waning days of Hyperborea. Yhoundeh's priests also banned Tsathoggua's cult, and her inquisitors punished any heretics. As the Hyperborean civilization drew to a close, Yhoundeh's priests fell out of favor and the people returned to the worship of Tsathoggua.

According to the Parchments of Pnom, Yhoundeh is the wife of Nyarlathotep, messenger of the Outer Gods.

== Cities ==
=== Commoriom ===
Commoriom was the first seat of power in Hyperborea, established by the pre-Human migrants from the south. In its heyday, Commoriom was a grand city, built of marble and granite and marked by a skyline of altitudinous spires.

Legend has it that the populace fled Commoriom when the White Sybil of Polarion foretold of its destruction. However, Athammaus, headsman of Commoriom, disputes this claim and attributes the abandonment to the increasingly loathsome depredations of the horrid outlaw Knygathin Zhaum.

=== Uzuldaroum ===
According to Smith's "The Tale of Satampra Zeiros", Uzuldaroum became the capital of Hyperborea after the populace left Commoriom. The city lies a day's journey from the former capital. It was the last population center in Hyperborea before glaciers overwhelmed the continent.

In H. P. Lovecraft's At the Mountains of Madness, the city of the Elder Things is called "a Palaeogaean megalopolis compared with which the fabled...Commoriom and Uzuldaroum...are recent things of today--not even of yesterday".

== Geographical locations ==
Map from the 1971 collection Hyperborea.

=== Eiglophian mountains ===
The Eiglophian mountains, mentioned in Smith's "The Seven Geases", are a terrifying range of ebon peaks, said to be "glassy-walled", and are believed to be honeycombed with hidden tunnels. The Eiglophian mountains cross the middle of the Hyperborean continent, with one range stretching to the south and another to the east.

=== Mhu Thulan ===
Mhu Thulan was a province in northern Hyperborea famous for its sorcerers. It was where the wizard Eibon dwelled, as well as many other notable sorcerers of Hyperborea, such as Zon Mezzamalech.

=== Mount Voormithadreth ===
Mount Voormithadreth is a four-coned extinct volcano and is the tallest peak in the Eiglophian mountains. It is the dwelling place of various horrors, including the toad-god Tsathoggua and the spider-god Atlach-Nacha.

==== Y'quaa ====
The gray-litten cavern of Y'quaa is the dwelling place of Abhoth, the Source of Uncleanliness. It is indirectly connected with the Cavern of Archetypes. Atlach-Nacha originated here. Y'quaa might be the true home of the enigmatic Ubbo-Sathla.

==== Cavern of Archetypes ====
The Cavern of the Archetypes is a vast cavern inhabited by the spectral archetypes of all life on this earth. Nug and Yeb reside here.

=== Polarion ===
Polarion was a region of northern Hyperborea, separated from the rest of the continent by an unnamed mountain range. It used to be a fertile place, but was later overtaken by glaciers. The White Sybil is said to originate from here.

== Notable denizens ==
=== Voormis ===
The voormis are the three-toed, umber-colored, fur-covered humanoids that once had a thriving civilization in Hyperborea. They dwelled underground and worshiped the god Tsathoggua. After most were wiped out by other pre-human settlers, the most savage of the Voormis became restricted to caves in the upper slopes of the Eiglophian mountains. Before Hyperborea's fall, the remaining Voormis were hunted for sport.

=== Citizens ===
==== Athammaus ====
Athammaus, who appears in Smith's "The Testament of Athammaus", was the headsman, or executioner, of Commoriom before its downfall. He was also one of the last to leave the city when the population fled to Uzuldaroum. Afterwards, he recorded a chilling testament of Commoriom's final days.

Athammaus was descended from a long line of headsmen. A consummate professional, Athammaus always took great pride in his skill and never shirked his official duty. His career suffered in Commoriom when he faced the task of executing the outlaw Knygathin Zhaum, but he later resumed it in Uzuldaroum where he served 11 lusters .

==== Eibon ====
Eibon, a character in Smith's "The Door to Saturn", was a sorcerer and priest of Zhothaqquah (Tsathoggua). He is renowned as the writer of the Book of Eibon, a tome that, among other things, chronicles Eibon's life, and includes his magical formulae and rites of Zhothaqquah (it is introduced in Smith's tale "Ubbo-Sathla"). Eibon lived in a five-story, five-sided tower made of black gneiss that stood beside the sea on Mhu Thulan. Eibon disappeared shortly after Yhoundeh's premier inquisitor, Morghi, came to his black tower with a writ for his arrest.

When the inquisition came knocking, Eibon fled to Cykranosh (the planet Saturn) through a magic panel given to him by Zhothaqquah. Eibon was never again seen on Earth after that. (When Morghi vanished close on the heels of Eibon, many believed that he was in league with the sorcerer all along and so is largely responsible for the decline in the worship of Yhoundeh.)

==== Knygathin Zhaum ====
Knygathin Zhaum was a notorious outlaw of Hyperborea. He was possibly the child of Sfatlicllp and a Voormi. Athammaus tried to execute him by beheading, but because of his preternatural heritage, such attempts proved unsuccessful and only served to aggravate him.

==== Satampra Zeiros ====
Satampra Zeiros, who appears in Smith's "The Tale of Satampra Zeiros" and its prequel, "The Theft of the Thirty-Nine Girdles", was the master thief of Uzuldaroum. His exploits are legendary. He lost his right hand during a failed venture to loot the deserted city of Commoriom (though his companion Tirouv Ompallios suffered a worse fate).

==== The White Sybil of Polarion ====
A strange woman, reportedly coming from the realms of ice creeping upon Hyperborea. She is presented in both "The Tale of Satampra Zeiros" and "The White Sybil." In the former, she is portrayed prophesizing the doom of Commoriom; in the latter, a character besotted with her pursues her into the ice realm, where he is in the end so blinded by her vision that when found by a common girl he takes his rescuer for the Sybil, weds her, and lives out his days in a joyous illusion, bearing the mark of the Sybil's kiss on his face.

== See also ==
- Hyperborea in Greek mythology
- Robert E. Howard's Hyborian Age
- Clark Ashton Smith bibliography
- Averoigne
- Poseidonis
- Zothique
