= Sadastor =

- Short story by Clark Ashton Smith
- Country: United States
- Language: English
- Genre: Fantasy

Publication
- Published in: Weird Tales
- Publication type: Periodical
- Media type: Print
- Publication date: July 1930

"Sadastor" is a fantasy short story by American writer Clark Ashton Smith, first published in July 1930, in the magazine Weird Tales.

== Plot Summary ==
An example of a narrative within a narrative, the frame story begins in Egypt when the "sphinx was young", with an (unnamed) Lamia sitting upon a ridge near the Nile River, who, due to her infamy, has been unable to procure a lover for a fortnight. Charnadis, a demon speaking with the lamia, provides the narrative for the further story, told to brighten the lamia's day.

In his youth, Charnadis was accustomed to use his wings to travel through space and explore remote and distant worlds. One day, while traveling through a particularly remote and far-off galaxy, Charnadis encounters a grey, desert planet orbiting a dying sun: the world of Sadastor. Flying over its equator, Charnadis finds a deep gorge in the former ocean bed and comes eventually to a tiny, green pool, the last of the oceans. About to leave, a voice calls out to him, asking Charnadis why he is there, and then relating its tale: it is a Siren, called Lyspial, the last of her kind on their world. After recounting her memories of Sadastor in its earlier days, when the seas were nearly boundless and she could easily prey upon sailors, Charnadis offers the siren transport to another world. Sobbing, Lyspial explains that she, being born of the seas of Sadastor, is bound to them and must perish with them.

The narrative ends with Charnadis chiding the lamia, and advising that she reflect on the siren's fate, which was infinitely worse than the lamia's own present predicament.

== Sources ==
- Smith, Clark Ashton (2006) [1930]. "Sadastor". In Scott Connors & Ron Hilger (ed.). The End of the Story Vol. 1 (1st ed.). San Francisco, USA: Nightshade Books. ISBN 978-1-59780-028-0. Definitive version.
