= Averoigne =

Fictional province in Clark Ashton Smith stories

Map drawn by Tim Kirk.

Averoigne is a fictional counterpart of a historical province in France, detailed in a series of short stories by the American writer Clark Ashton Smith. Smith may have based Averoigne on the actual province of Auvergne, but its name was probably influenced by the French department of Aveyron, immediately south of Auvergne, due to the similarity in pronunciation. Sixteen of Smith's stories take place in Averoigne. In Smith's fiction, the Southern French province is considered "the most witch-ridden in the entire country." The most well-known citizen is Gaspard du Nord of Vyones, a wizard who translated The Book of Eibon into Norman French.

== Fictional history ==
In ancient times, Smith depicts Averoigne as having been settled by the fictional Gallic tribe called the Averones. They established a number of settlements in the region, many of which were fortified when the Roman Empire absorbed the region. When Christianity spread through the Empire, many churches and monasteries were established among the ruins of Druidic temples. Greatest among these was a great cathedral constructed in Vyones, completed in 1138.

== Fictional geography ==
Averoigne is depicted by Smith as being located in the southern half of France. The northern half of the territory is dominated by the walled city of Vyones, site of an impressive cathedral. In the southern half is located the town of Ximes; the main road of Averoigne runs between Ximes and Vyones, straight through the thick, dark forest that blankets the province. A river called Isoile flows from the mountains in the northern part of the province to feed into a swamp in the south.

Other towns and villages depicted by Smith as being located in Averoigne include: Moulins, Les Hiboux, La Frenâie, Touraine, Sainte Zenobie, and Périgon. In the forest can be found haunted ruins, such as the Château of Fausseflammes and the stronghold of Ylourgne. (It was from that abandoned abode of evil robber barons, that the horrific events of The Colossus of Ylourgne had their start.)

== Reception ==
In 1993, Stefan Dziemianowicz wrote in Dark Eidolon: The Journal of Smith Studies that "The Colossus of Ylourgne, with its series of increasingly bizarre events culminating in the rampage of the most awesome monster to appear in Smith's fiction, comes closest of any of the Averoigne tales to evoking the sense of wonder in Smith's otherworldly fantasies... Smith appears to be saying that even the sorcerers of Averoigne are unable to transcend their flawed humanity."

== Bibliography ==
Smith based the following stories in the Averoigne setting:

- "The End of the Story", by Clark Ashton Smith (Weird Tales, Popular Fiction Publishing Co., May 1930)
- "A Rendezvous in Averoigne", by Clark Ashton Smith (Weird Tales, Popular Fiction Publishing Co., April/May 1931)
- "The Satyr" (alternate ending), by Clark Ashton Smith (La Paree Stories, Merwil Publishing, July 1931)
- "The Maker of Gargoyles" (synopsis), by Clark Ashton Smith (Weird Tales, Popular Fiction Publishing Co., August 1932)
- "The Mandrakes", by Clark Ashton Smith (Weird Tales, Popular Fiction Publishing Co., February 1933)
- "The Beast of Averoigne" (originally published version), by Clark Ashton Smith (Weird Tales, Popular Fiction Publishing Co., May 1933)
- "The Holiness of Azédarac", by Clark Ashton Smith (Weird Tales, Popular Fiction Publishing Co., November 1933)
- "A Night in Malnéant", by Clark Ashton Smith (The Double Shadow and Other Fantasies, 1933)
- "The Colossus of Ylourgne", by Clark Ashton Smith (Weird Tales, Popular Fiction Publishing Co., June 1934)
- "The Disinterment of Venus" (synopsis), by Clark Ashton Smith (Weird Tales, Popular Fiction Publishing Co., July 1934)
- "Mother of Toads" (originally published version), by Clark Ashton Smith (Weird Tales, Popular Fiction Publishing Co., July 1938)
- "The Enchantress of Sylaire", by Clark Ashton Smith (Weird Tales, Weird Tales, July 1941)
- "Averoigne" (poetry), by Clark Ashton Smith (Challenge, Spring 1951)

All these stories have recently been collected in the ebook The Averoigne Archives: The Complete Averoigne Tales of Clark Ashton Smith (Pickman's Press, 2019).

=== Fragments ===
A number of other Averoigne stories exist in outline form, incomplete at the time of Smith's death. These include:

- "The Gargoyle of Vyones"
- "The Sorceress of Averoigne/The Tower of Istarelle"
- "Queen of the Sabbat"
- "The Doom of Azédarac"
- "The Oracle of Sadoqua"
- "The Werewolf of Averoigne"

=== Other writers ===
Other writers have set stories in Averoigne, including:

- "Out of the Aeons", by H.P. Lovecraft (with Hazel Heald), 1933
- "The Butcher of Vyones", by Michael Minnis (The Sorcerer's Apprentices, Sunken Citadel/Tenoka Press, 1998)
- "The Circumstances of Ghostly Cats", by Michael Minnis (Apocalypse Rhythm: The Complete Cthulhu Mythos Tales of Michael Minnis, Volume 1, Lindisfarne Press)
- "Gros Vert", by Michael Minnis (Apocalypse Rhythm: The Complete Cthulhu Mythos Tales of Michael Minnis, Volume 1, Lindisfarne Press)
- "Symposium of the Gargoyle: A Tale of Nineteenth Century Averoigne", by Simon Whitechapel
- "The Passing of Belzévuthe" by Simon Whitechapel
- "Hugh the Discerning" by Garnett Elliott
- "The Doom of Azédarac" "posthumous collaboration" by Ron Hilger
- "The Oracle of Sadoqua" "posthumous collaboration" by Ron Hilger
- The Dungeons & Dragons module X2, Castle Amber, designed by Tom Moldvay, contains numerous references to and includes Averoigne and several of its characters as a temporary adventure setting

There is a reference to Averoigne and its borders with James Branch Cabell's Poictesme in the second volume of The League of Extraordinary Gentlemen graphic novels by Alan Moore and Kevin O'Neill.

=== In Other Media ===
Averoigne appears in several other works, including:

- In the novel A Case of Conscience, James Blish includes a character named "Lucien le Comte des Bois d'Averoigne." This name means, "Lucien, the Count of the Woods of Averoigne."
- In the manga The Case Study of Vanitas Volume 1, the protagonist Noé Archiviste is said to come from Averoigne.

== See also ==
- Hyperborean cycle
- Poseidonis
- Zothique
- Clark Ashton Smith bibliography
- Castle Amber
