= The Emperor of Dreams =

Collection of short stories by Clark Ashton Smith

- Cover of the first edition
- Author: Clark Ashton Smith
- Cover artist: Jeffrey K. Potter
- Language: English
- Genre: Fantasy, horror, science fiction
- Publisher: Gollancz
- Publication date: 2002
- Publication place: United Kingdom
- Media type: Print (paperback)
- Pages: 580
- ISBN: 0-575-07373-X
- OCLC: 59497793

The Emperor of Dreams is a collection of American fantasy author and poet Clark Ashton Smith's short tales arranged in chronological order. It was published by Gollancz in 2002 as the 26th volume of their Fantasy Masterworks series. The collection contains stories from Smith's major story cycles of Averoigne, Hyperborea, Poseidonis, and Zothique. Most of the stories originally appeared in the magazines The Fantasy Fan, Weird Tales, Overland Monthly, Strange Tales of Mystery and Terror, The Magic Carpet/Oriental Stories, The Auburn Journal, Stirring Science Stories, The Arkham Sampler, Saturn and Fantastic Universe.

== Contents ==
- "On Fantasy"
- "Song of the Necromancer"
- "The Abominations of Yondo"
- "The Ninth Skeleton"
- "The Last Incantation"
- "A Rendezvous in Averoigne"
- "The Return of the Sorcerer"
- "The Tale of Satampra Zeiros"
- "The Door to Saturn"
- "The Gorgon"
- "The Weird of Avoosl Wuthoqquan"
- "The Nameless Offspring"
- "The Empire of the Necromancers"
- "The Hunters from Beyond"
- "The Isle of the Torturers"
- "The Beast of Averoigne"
- "Genius Loci"
- "Ubbo-Sathla"
- "The Kiss of Zoraida"
- "The Seed from the Sepulcher"
- "The Weaver in the Vault"
- "The Ghoul"
- "The Charnel God"
- "The Death of Malygris"
- "The Tomb-Spawn"
- "The Seven Geases"
- "Xeethra"
- "The Dark Eidolon"
- "The Flower-Women"
- "The Treader of the Dust"
- "The Black Abbot of Puthuum"
- "Necromancy in Naat"
- "The Death of Ilalotha"
- "The Garden of Adompha"
- "Mother of Toads"
- "The Double Shadow"
- "The Coming of the White Worm"
- "The Root of Ampoi"
- "Morthylla"
- "An Offering to the Moon"
- "The Theft of Thirty-Nine Girdles"
- "Symposium of the Gorgon"
- "Told in the Desert"
- "Prince Alcouz and the Magician"
- "A Good Embalmer"
- "The Mortuary "
- Afterword: The Lost Worlds of Klarkash-Ton, by Stephen Jones

== Sources ==
- Brown, Charles N.; William G. Contento. "The Locus Index to Science Fiction (2002)".
