= A Rendezvous in Averoigne =

1988 book by Clark Ashton Smith

- Dust-jacket illustration by Jeffrey K. Potter
- Author: Clark Ashton Smith
- Illustrator: Jeffrey K. Potter
- Cover artist: Jeffrey K. Potter
- Language: English
- Genre: Science fiction, Fantasy, Horror
- Publisher: Arkham House
- Publication date: 1988
- Publication place: United States
- Media type: Print (hardback)
- Pages: x, 472
- ISBN: 0-87054-156-0
- OCLC: 16870682
- Dewey Decimal: 813/.54 19
- LC Class: PS3537.M335 A6 1988

A Rendezvous in Averoigne is a collection of science fiction, fantasy and horror stories by American writer Clark Ashton Smith. It was released in 1988 by Arkham House in an edition of 5,025 copies. The collection contains stories from Smith's major story cycles of Averoigne, Hyperborea, Poseidonis, Xiccarph, and Zothique. Its title story is a relatively conventional vampire story.

== Contents ==
A Rendezvous in Averoigne contains the following stories:

1. "Introduction", by Ray Bradbury
2. Averoigne
  - "The Holiness of Azédarac"
  - "The Colossus of Ylourgne"
  - "The End of the Story"
  - "A Rendezvous in Averoigne"
3. Atlantis
  - "The Last Incantation"
  - "The Death of Malygris"
  - "A Voyage to Sfanomoë"
4. Hyperborea
  - "The Weird of Avoosl Wuthoqquan"
  - "The Seven Geases"
  - "The Tale of Satampra Zeiros"
  - "The Coming of the White Worm"
5. Lost Worlds
  - "The City of the Singing Flame"
  - "The Dweller in the Gulf"
  - "The Chain of Aforgomon"
  - "Genius Loci"
  - "The Maze of Maal Dweb"
  - "The Vaults of Yoh-Vombis"
  - "The Uncharted Isle"
  - "The Planet of the Dead"
  - "Master of the Asteroid"
6. Zothique
  - "The Empire of the Necromancers"
  - "The Charnel God"
  - "Xeethra"
  - "The Dark Eidolon"
  - "The Death of Ilalotha"
  - "The Last Hieroglyph"
  - "Necromancy in Naat"
  - "The Garden of Adompha"
  - "The Isle of the Torturers"
  - "Morthylla"

== Reprints ==
- 2nd printing, 2003 (no print numbers).

== See also ==
- Clark Ashton Smith bibliography

== Sources ==
- Jaffery, Sheldon (1989). The Arkham House Companion. Mercer Island, WA: Starmont House, Inc. p. 142. ISBN 1-55742-005-X.
- Chalker, Jack L.; Mark Owings (1998). The Science-Fantasy Publishers: A Bibliographic History, 1923-1998. Westminster, MD and Baltimore: Mirage Press, Ltd. pp. 56–57.
- Joshi, S.T. (1999). Sixty Years of Arkham House: A History and Bibliography. Sauk City, WI: Arkham House. pp. 157–158. ISBN 0-87054-176-5.
- Nielsen, Leon (2004). Arkham House Books: A Collector's Guide. Jefferson, NC and London: McFarland & Company, Inc. pp. 134, 147. ISBN 0-7864-1785-4.
