= The Last Hieroglyph =

- Short story by Clark Ashton Smith
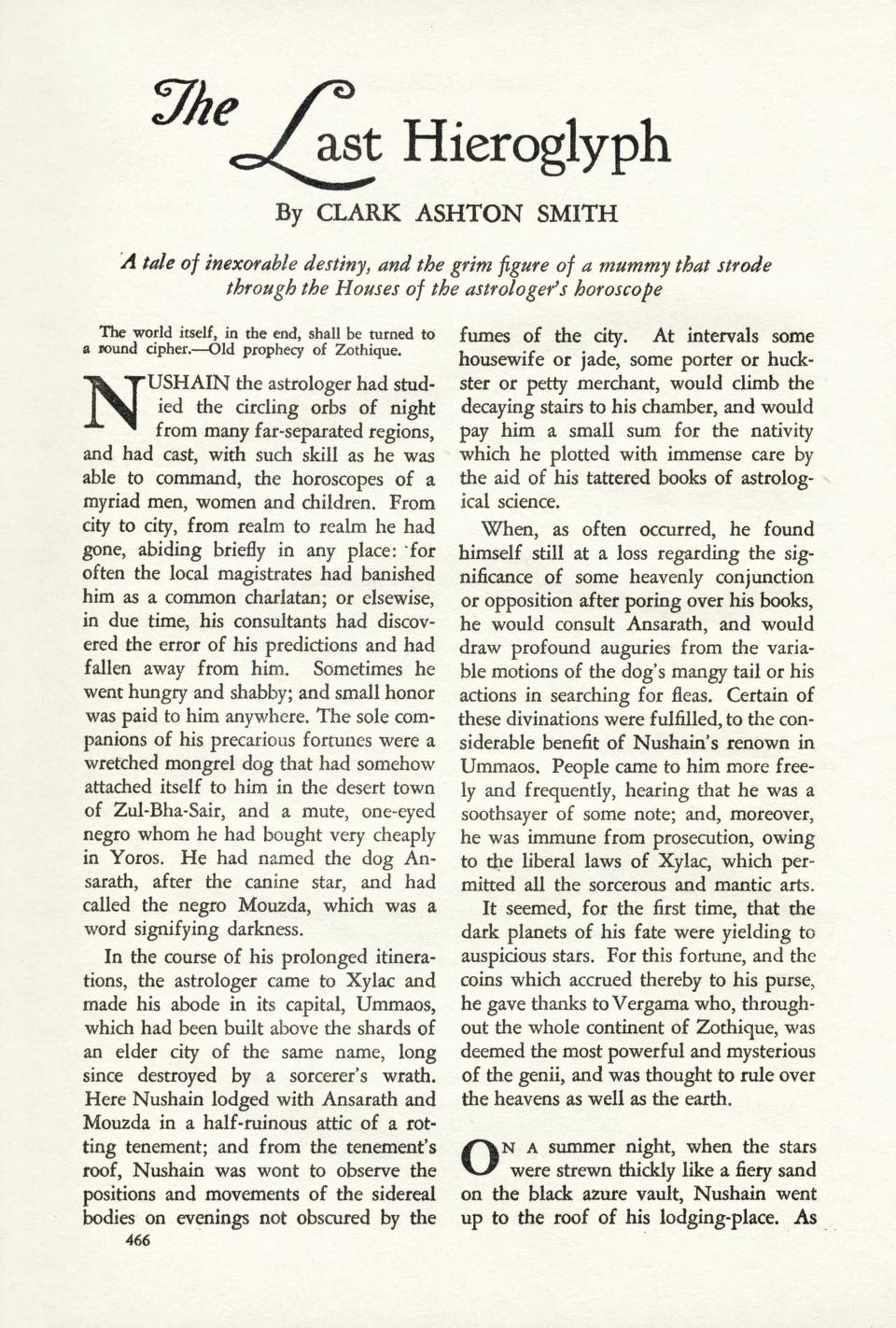
- Title page of "The Last Hieroglyph" as it appeared in Weird Tales, April 1935.
- Country: United States
- Language: English
- Genre: Fantasy

Publication
- Published in: Weird Tales
- Publication type: Pulp magazine
- Publisher: Popular Fiction Publishing Co.
- Media type: Print
- Publication date: April 1935
- Series: Zothique

"The Last Hieroglyph " is a short story by American author Clark Ashton Smith as part of his Zothique cycle, and first published in the April 1935 issue of Weird Tales.

== Publication history ==
According to Emperor of Dreams: A Clark Ashton Smith Bibliography (1978) by Donald Sidney-Fryer, "The Last Hieroglyph" was first published in the April 1935 issue of Weird Tales. It was included in the books Lost Worlds (1944) and Zothique (1970).

== Plot ==
Nushain the astrologer in Xylac charts a new horoscope which he copies down in a book. The horoscope foretells of a journey involving three guides to the house of Vergama, a god. A mummy appears in his written horoscope. Soon he is visited by a mummy who leads Nushain from his abode to the underworld. Nushain is accompanied by his black servant Mouzda and his dog Ansarath. Initially, he is overwhelmed by the underworld and flees back the way he came but ends up getting lost. The mummy finds him and leads Nushain to the shore of an unknown ocean. There they are visited by a merman and an uncrewed ship. The ship follows the merman as it sends them over a boiling ocean. The ship brings them to a wall of fire. A salamander beckons them to follow it through the wall and they do so. The salamander sends them to a staircase that ends with a house of great height. They find that it is the home of the god Vergama. Vergama shows them they are all characters in his book as he points to the three guides that led them here: the mummy, the merman, and the salamander. Turning a page, a great wind sweeps up the three as they find that they too are merely characters in Vergama's book.

== Reception ==
In the 1981 book Twentieth-Century Science-Fiction Writers, Will Murray called it an "ironic tale." In the 1977 book The Weird Tales Story, Robert Weinberg called it "one of his typical entertaining fantasies of Zothique."

== See also ==
- Clark Ashton Smith bibliography
