= The Weaver in the Vault =

- Short story by Clark Ashton Smith
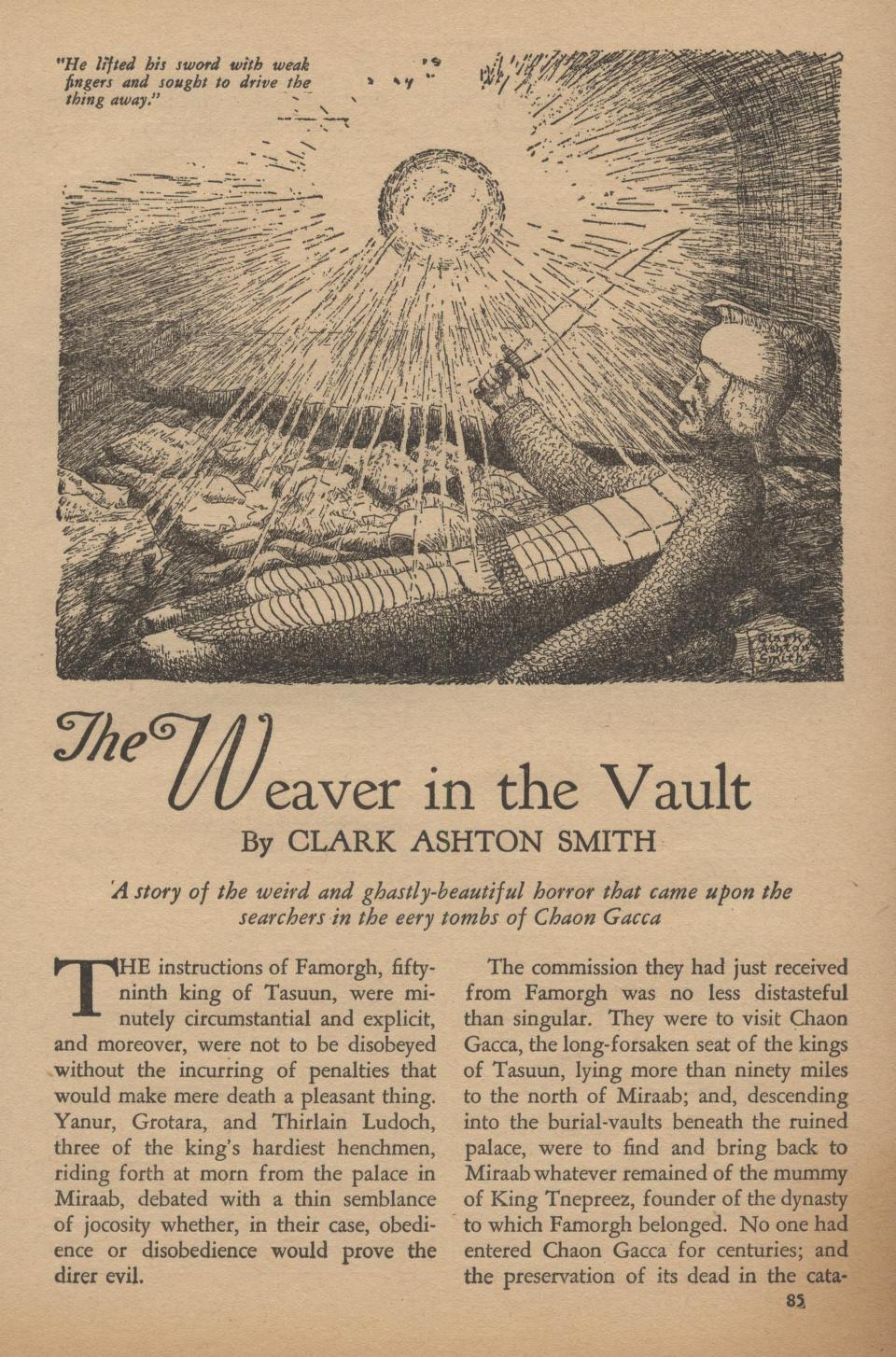
- Title page of "The Weaver in the Vault" as it appeared in Weird Tales, January 1934. Illustration by Clark Ashton Smith.
- Country: United States
- Language: English
- Genre: Dark Fantasy

Publication
- Published in: Weird Tales
- Publication type: Pulp magazine
- Publisher: Popular Fiction Publishing Co.
- Media type: Print
- Publication date: January 1934
- Series: Zothique

"The Weaver in the Vault" is a short story by American author Clark Ashton Smith as part of his Zothique cycle, and first published in the January 1934 issue of Weird Tales.

== Publication history ==
According to Emperor of Dreams: A Clark Ashton Smith Bibliography (1978) by Donald Sidney-Fryer, "The Weaver in the Vault" was first published in the January 1934 issue of Weird Tales. It was included in the books Genius Loci and Other Tales (1948) and Zothique (1970).

== Plot ==
The king of Tasuun, Famorgh, sends three henchmen (Yanur, Grotara, Thirlain Ludoch) from Miraab to Chaon Gacca to deliver the mummified remains of King Tnepreez. As they journey from the city in a caravan of camels, they note that a similar task had occurred in the past; Yanur notes two centuries ago King Mandis asked two of his men for the golden mirror of Queen Avaina as a gift for his favorite leman. However, those two never returned and the king offered a different gift instead. The three remark that Chaon Gacca is occupied by shadows from the desert Dloth. Thirlain Ludoch points out that the shadows would appear in palaces and, when touched, would wither the skin upon contact - King Ameni had injured his hand due to these same shadows. Additionally, Yanur remarks that Chaon Gacca was also besieged by earthquakes. The three find their task before them arduous, as the mummy was requested by Famorgh's new queen Lunalia, a princess of the desert Xylac; when other mummies would do. One night they camp within the shrine of Yuckla, the god of laughter. Later, as they approach the tomb, they drink a vintage which renders them unafraid amid the gloom. In the tombs, they find that the mummies are missing while, concurrently, the tomb is wrecked by earthquakes. One tremor kills Yanur and Thirlain Ludoch. Despite surviving the tremors, Grotara's condition rapidly deteriorates. Weak and unable to escape, he discovers an orb that draws power from the dead floating from the chasms. It waits for Grotara to die as it weaves a web before death befalls him.

== Reception ==
In the 1981 book Twentieth-Century Science-Fiction Writers, Will Murray noted the story as "the weird doom of two individuals who desecrate the tomb."

== See also ==
- Clark Ashton Smith bibliography
