= The Testament of Athammaus =

- Short story by Clark Ashton Smith
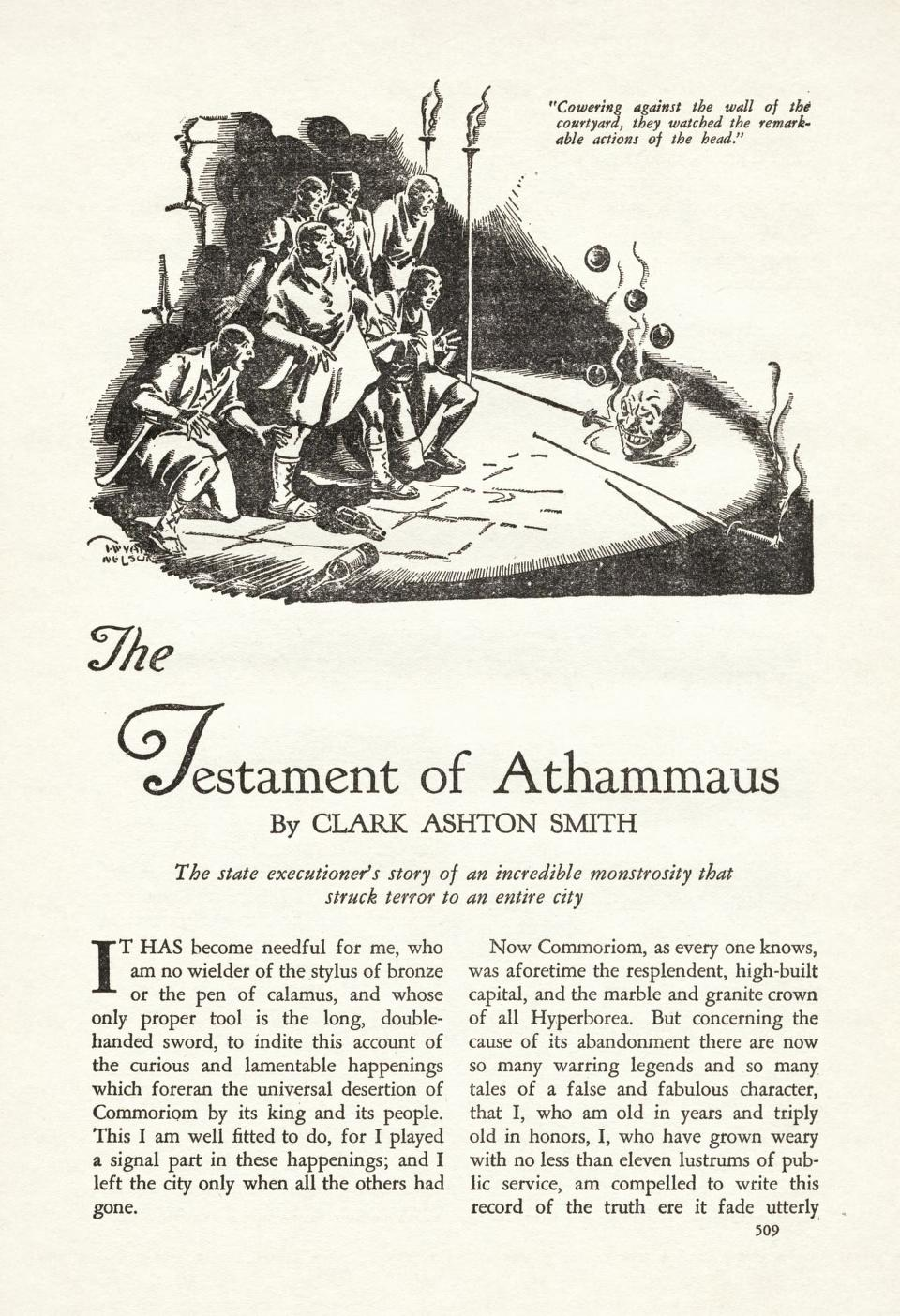
- Title page of "The Testament of Athammaus" as it appeared in Weird Tales, October 1932. Illustration by T. Wyatt Nelson.
- Country: United States
- Language: English
- Genre: Fantasy

Publication
- Published in: Weird Tales
- Publication type: Pulp magazine
- Publisher: Popular Fiction Publishing Co.
- Media type: Print
- Publication date: October 1932
- Series: Hyperborean cycle

"The Testament of Athammaus" is a short story by American writer Clark Ashton Smith, part of his Hyperborean cycle. It was published in the October 1932 issue of Weird Tales.

== Publication history ==
According to Emperor of Dreams: A Clark Ashton Smith Bibliography (1978) by Donald Sidney-Fryer, "The Testament of Athammaus" was first published in the October 1932 issue of Weird Tales. It was included in Out of Space and Time (1942), Swords and Sorcery (1963), Hyperborea (1971), and the April 1971 issue of The Magazine of Horror.

== Synopsis ==
The story is written from the recollection of the aged Headsman Athammaus on the events which led to the abandonment of Commoriom, the once great capital of Hyperborea, for its present capital of Uzuldaroum, of whose circumstances he considers to be in dire need of being recorded to combat the now emerging myths surrounding the reasons why the city was abandoned. Athammaus then proceeds to relate how in his lifelong career as a headsman he has failed to successfully carry out his duty but once, this one failure causing Commoriom's downfall. He tells of how news had come from the settlements near the Eiglophian Mountains of a murderous band of Voormi with their vile and bizarre hairless hybrid being named Knygathin Zhaum, who was rumored to be the product of the union of a Voormi and a being related to the deity Tsathoggua; furthermore, it was rumored that this being was invulnerable to any weapon and capable of escaping any form of imprisonment, which at the time Athammaus dismissed as only vulgar superstition. Then one day it came about that Knygathin Zhaum was successfully ambushed while alone. To the surprise of his captors he showed no resistance and, with a sardonic expression on his face, he was led back to Commoriom, where he was convicted and sentenced to death by eight judges and Loquamethros, King of Commoriom, and held in a chamber below Commoriom's dungeons to await his fate. According to Athammaus, Knygathin Zhaum's beheading seemed to proceed successfully, although as Athammaus had suspected, Knygathin Zhaum did not bleed following decapitation but only produced a trickle of black ichor.

Following his execution, Knygathin Zhaum was buried that very day and everything went as normal; however, on the morning of the next day the citizens of Commoriom held witness with horror a resurrected Knygathin Zhaum devouring one of its inhabitants. Upon his arrest, there followed a change of law necessary to allow for someone to be executed twice. Knygathin Zhaum was sentenced again to die. His rising from the dead was rationalized by Athammaus as due to his preternatural heritage and thus alien physiology. Following his second beheading (during which Athammaus noticed disturbing distortions in Knygathin Zhaum's features, despite it only being the day after the first beheading), Knygathin Zhaum was buried beneath heavy boulders in the hope that if he were to come back to life he would not be able to escape. Yet the next morning Knygathin Zhaum was witnessed a second time by the citizens devouring one of the eight judges. Many of the superstitious citizens left the city despite Knygathin Zhaum's third arrest and execution on the same day. This time no chances were taken; the body Knygathin Zhaum was buried in a bronze sarcophagus under heavy guard, while on the other side of the city his head was placed in a small bronze sarcophagus and placed under guard of Athammaus and his remaining men. For the first hours everything proceeded as normal, but then the men heard a banging from within each of the sarcophagi, which then burst open as from some incredible force, revealing masses of strange liquid which proceeded towards each other, then merged and once again formed Knygathin Zhaum. The monster now commits more cannibal atrocities. This was all too much for Commoriom's citizens, who immediately began to depart in a mass exodus, leaving Athammaus and his men behind to do battle with the fiend; however, they realized that the rumours of Knygathin Zhaum being both immortal and uncontainable are true. With each beheading and resurrection, Knygathin Zhaum becomes less human until he is a worse-than-formless horror filling the entire city square. Thus Athammaus and his men were forced to leave the city.

== Reception ==
Robert Weinberg praises the story as "a perfect example of Smith's bizarre humor". Reviewing Out of Space and Time in the 1983 book The Guide to Supernatural Fiction, E. F. Bleiler remarked "Like certain other Hyperborean stories, with touches of grisly humor."

== Sources ==
- The Testament of Athammaus title listing at the Internet Speculative Fiction Database
