= The Witchcraft of Ulua =

- Short story by Clark Ashton Smith
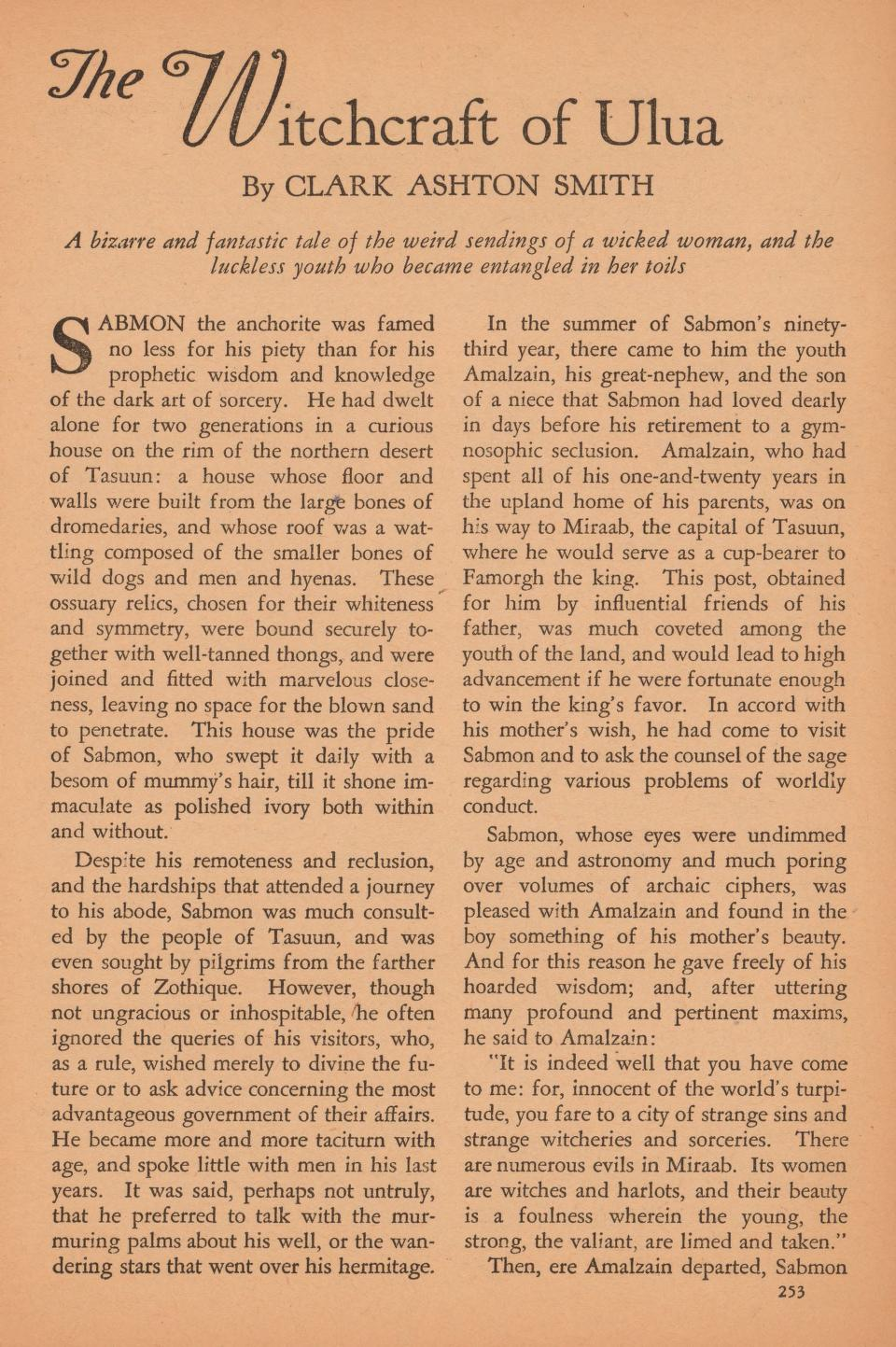
- Title page of "The Witchcraft of Ulua" as it appeared in Weird Tales, February 1934.
- Country: United States
- Language: English
- Genre: Fantasy

Publication
- Published in: Weird Tales
- Publication type: Pulp magazine
- Publisher: Popular Fiction Publishing Co.
- Media type: Print
- Publication date: February 1934
- Series: Zothique

"The Witchcraft of Ulua" is a short story by American author Clark Ashton Smith as part of his Zothique cycle, and first published in the February 1934 issue of Weird Tales.

== Publication history ==
According to Emperor of Dreams: A Clark Ashton Smith Bibliography (1978) by Donald Sidney-Fryer, "The Witchcraft of Ulua" was first published in the February 1934 issue of Weird Tales. It was included in the books The Abominations of Yondo (1960) and Zothique (1970).

== Plot ==
Sabmon lives in a house made of bones on the edge of a northern desert of Tasuun. He was famous for his dark arts and many sought his advice and divination. Amalzain, a great nephew of Sabmon, visits him and he tells Amalzain that Amalzain will be chosen as cupbearer for King Famorgh in Miraab. Sabmon recommends an amulet that contains the ashes of Yos Ebni, who weathered temptation until death. Sabmon tells Amalzain to abstain from temptation but should it prove too great he should return to Sabmon and work as his apprentice. Amalzain travels to Miraab and finds much decadence in the court of the king Famorgh. Amid his work, he finds that Princess Ulua has inherited some of the sorcery from her mother queen Lunalia. While princess Ulua seeks after Amalzain, Amalzain refutes her advances. However, at night, Amalzain is visited by undead things. These visitations drive Amalzain towards madness. Asking the king for a leave of absence, Amalzain returns to Sabmon. Sabmon understands what Amalzain has been through. Sabmon then procures a magic mirror. Through the mirror, Amalzain witnesses the destruction of Miraab. Since then, Amalzain remains Sabmon's student.

== Themes ==
In the 1988 book Fantasy: The 100 Best Books, James Cawthorn and Michael Moorcock noted the stories "Necromancy in Naat", "The Witchcraft of Ulua", and "The Black Abbot of Puthuum" on the theme of love and lust.

== See also ==
- Clark Ashton Smith bibliography
