= Lost Worlds (Smith short story collection) =

1944 collection of short stories by Clark Ashton Smith

- Cover of Lost Worlds
- Author: Clark Ashton Smith
- Cover artist: Burt Trimpey and Clark Ashton Smith
- Language: English
- Genre: Fantasy, horror, science fiction
- Publisher: Arkham House
- Publication date: 1944
- Publication place: United States
- Media type: Print (hardback)
- Pages: 419

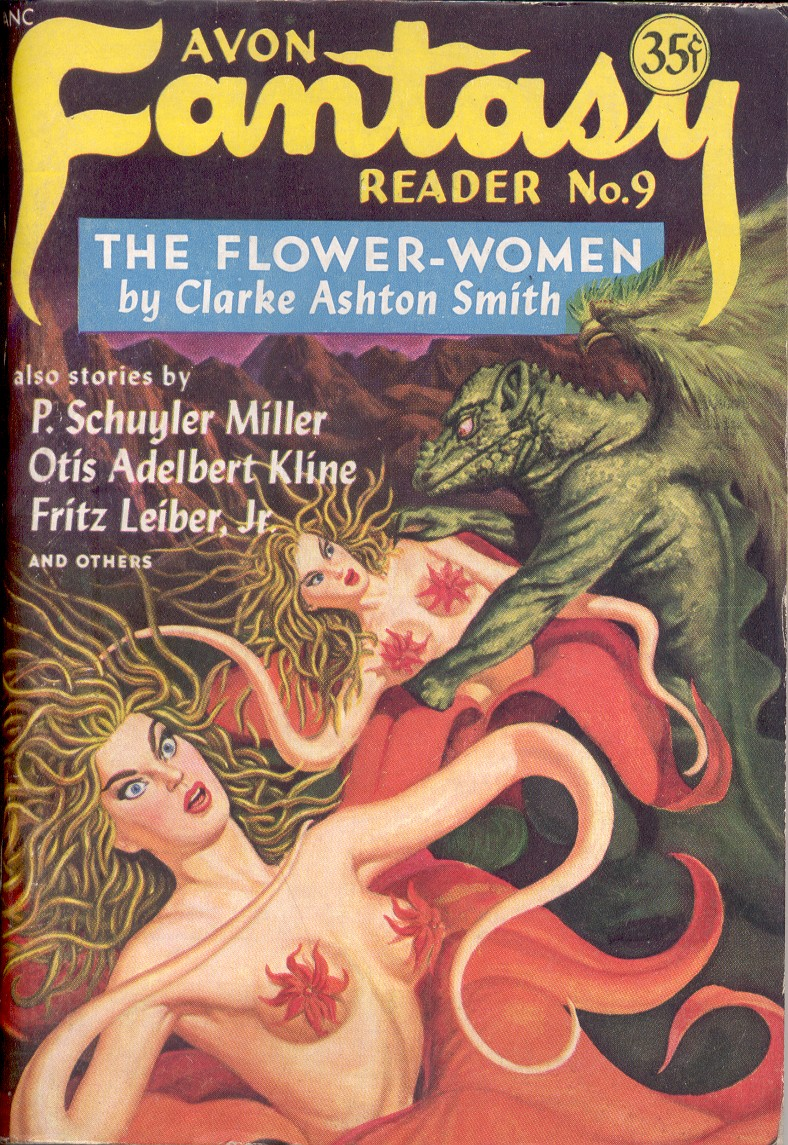
"The Flower-Women" was later republished in a 1949 issue of Avon Fantasy Reader.

Lost Worlds is a collection of fantasy, horror and science fiction short stories by the American writer Clark Ashton Smith. It was published in 1944 and was the author's second book published by Arkham House. 2,043 copies were printed.

The stories for this volume were selected by the author. The collection contains stories from Smith's major story cycles of Hyperborea, Atlantis, Averoigne, Zothique and Xiccarph.

== Contents ==
- "The Tale of Satampra Zeiros"
- "The Door to Saturn"
- "The Seven Geases"
- "The Coming of the White Worm"
- "The Last Incantation"
- "A Voyage to Sfanomoë"
- "The Death of Malygris"
- "The Holiness of Azédarac"
- "The Beast of Averoigne"
- "The Empire of the Necromancers"
- "The Isle of the Torturers"
- "Necromancy in Naat"
- "Xeethra"
- "The Maze of Maal Dweb"
- "The Flower-Women"
- "The Demon of the Flower"
- "The Plutonian Drug"
- "The Planet of the Dead"
- "The Gorgon"
- "The Letter from Mohaun Los"
- "The Light from Beyond"
- "The Hunters from Beyond"
- "The Treader of the Dust"

== Reception ==
In the 2005 book Horror: Another 100 Best Books, the author Storm Constantine remarked that "they come across as slightly camp now, but still with the power to captivate". In the 1991 book The Science-Fantasy Publishers: A Critical and Bibliographic History, the authors Jack L. Chalker and Mark Owings noted "superb stories". The New York Times reviewer Marjorie Farber declared, "What is most fascinating about the present volume is the sort of obfuscatory prose which readers of Weird Tales, etc. are apparently willing to overcome for the sake of getting at whatever terror may lie at the end of the skull-dotted trail," concluding that Lost Worlds "cannot be read." In the 1989 book The Arkham House Companion: Fifty Years of Arkham House, the author Sheldon Jaffery compared it with Out of Space and Time and decided "the quality is slightly diminished". Black Gate's Robert Burke Richardson wrote, "In Lost Worlds, the condition of an uncaring universe becomes not a case for despair, but rather for a weird and precious celebration."

== Reprints ==
- Jersey, Channel Islands: Neville Spearman, 1971.
- St. Albans, UK: Panther, 1974 (2 vols.).
- Lincoln, NE: Bison, 2006.

== See also ==
- Clark Ashton Smith bibliography

== Sources ==
- Jaffery, Sheldon (1989). The Arkham House Companion. Mercer Island, WA: Starmont House, Inc. pp. 8–9. ISBN 1-55742-005-X.
- Chalker, Jack L.; Mark Owings (1998). The Science-Fantasy Publishers: A Bibliographic History, 1923-1998. Westminster, MD and Baltimore: Mirage Press, Ltd. p. 27.
- Joshi, S.T. (1999). Sixty Years of Arkham House: A History and Bibliography. Sauk City, WI: Arkham House. p. 27. ISBN 0-87054-176-5.
- Nielsen, Leon (2004). Arkham House Books: A Collector's Guide. Jefferson, NC and London: McFarland & Company, Inc. p. 52. ISBN 0-7864-1785-4.
