= Genius Loci and Other Tales =

1948 collection of short stories by Clark Ashton Smith

- Jacket illustration by Frank Wakefield for Genius Loci and Other Tales by Clark Ashton Smith
- Author: Clark Ashton Smith
- Cover artist: Frank Wakefield
- Language: English
- Genre: Fantasy, horror, science fiction
- Publisher: Arkham House
- Publication date: 1948
- Publication place: United States
- Media type: Print (hardback)
- Pages: 228

Genius Loci and Other Tales is a collection of fantasy, horror and science fiction short stories by American writer Clark Ashton Smith. It was released in 1948 and was the author's third book published by Arkham House. It was released in an edition of 3,047 copies. The stories were written between 1930 and 1935.

The collection contains stories from Smith's major story cycles of Averoigne and Zothique.

== Contents ==
Genius Loci and Other Tales contains the following stories:

- "Genius Loci"
- "The Willow Landscape"
- "The Ninth Skeleton"
- "The Phantoms of the Fire"
- "The Eternal World"
- "Vulthoom"
- "A Star-Change"
- "The Primal City"
- "The Disinterment of Venus"
- "The Colossus of Ylourgne"
- "The Satyr"
- "The Garden of Adompha"
- "The Charnel God"
- "The Black Abbot of Puthuum"
- "The Weaver in the Vault"

== See also ==
- Clark Ashton Smith bibliography

== Sources ==
- Jaffery, Sheldon (1989). The Arkham House Companion. Mercer Island, WA: Starmont House, Inc. p. 34. ISBN 1-55742-005-X.
- Chalker, Jack L.; Mark Owings (1998). The Science-Fantasy Publishers: A Bibliographic History, 1923-1998. Westminster, MD and Baltimore: Mirage Press, Ltd. p. 32.
- Joshi, S.T. (1999). Sixty Years of Arkham House: A History and Bibliography. Sauk City, WI: Arkham House. pp. 49–50. ISBN 0-87054-176-5.
- Nielsen, Leon (2004). Arkham House Books: A Collector's Guide. Jefferson, NC and London: McFarland & Company, Inc. p. 68. ISBN 0-7864-1785-4.
