= The Black Abbot of Puthuum =

- Short story by Clark Ashton Smith
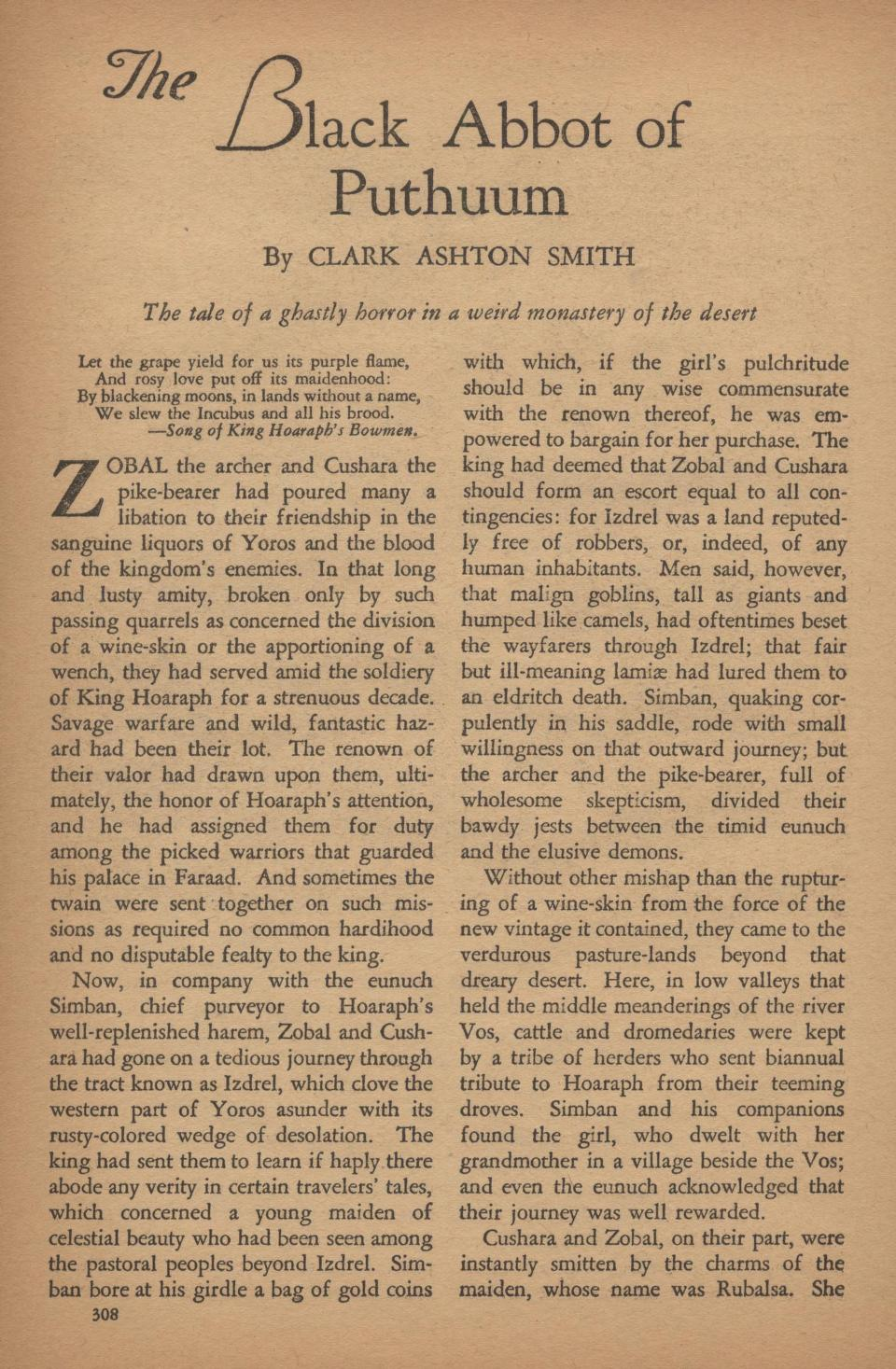
- Title page of "The Black Abbot of Puthuum" as it appeared in Weird Tales, March 1936.
- Country: United States
- Language: English
- Genre: Fantasy

Publication
- Published in: Weird Tales
- Publication type: Pulp magazine
- Publisher: Popular Fiction Publishing Co.
- Media type: Print
- Publication date: March 1936
- Series: Zothique

"The Black Abbot of Puthuum" is a short story by American author Clark Ashton Smith as part of his Zothique cycle, and first published in the March 1936 issue of Weird Tales.

== Publication history ==
According to Emperor of Dreams: A Clark Ashton Smith Bibliography (1978) by Donald Sidney-Fryer, "The Black Abbot of Puthuum" was first published in the March 1936 issue of Weird Tales. It was included in the books Genius Loci and Other Tales (1948) and Zothique (1970).

== Plot ==
In Yoros, Zobal the archer and Cushara the pike-bearer are assigned by king Hoaraph to retrieve the maiden Rubalsa from Izdrel for the king's harem. They are accompanied by the eunuch Simban. While they retrieve Rubalsa and head off for Yoros, a darkness envelops them. Surrounded by darkness, strange sounds haunt them. Eventually they are met by a black man Ujuk, who is an abbot for the monastery Puthuum. Ujuk invites them to a feast, but Zobal and Cushara are skeptical of his intentions. Later that night, Zobal finds an animate mummy named Uldor. Uldor tells Zobal he was the last survivor of a monastery. However, in the final days, Uldor was visited by a lamia and they had a son, Ujuk and pleads with Zobal to kill him.
Later on, Ujuk attacks and murders Simban. Zobal kills Ujuk, making Puthuum and all the monks disappear. Deciding this is outside the deal the king made with them, Zobal and Cushara draw lots to decide who will take Rubalsa for their own. Instead, Rubalsa chooses Cushara.

== Themes ==
In the 1988 book Fantasy: The 100 Best Books, James Cawthorn and Michael Moorcock noted the stories "Necromancy in Naat", "The Witchcraft of Ulua", and "The Black Abbot of Puthuum" on the theme of love and lust.

== See also ==
- Clark Ashton Smith bibliography
