= Xeethra =

- Short story by Clark Ashton Smith
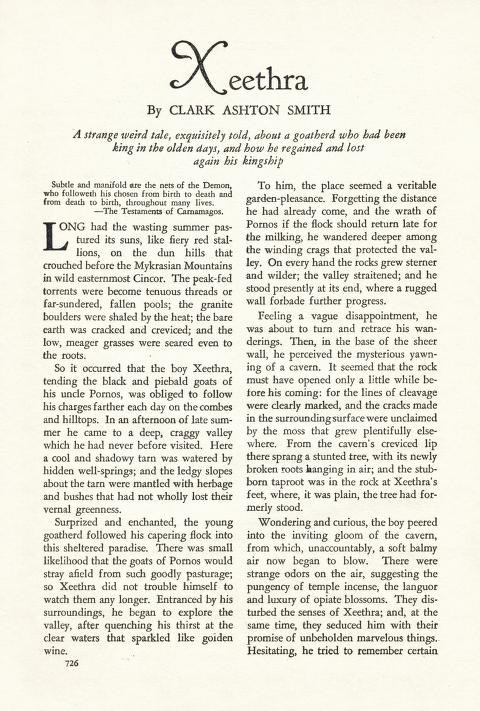
- Title page of "Xeethra" as it appeared in Weird Tales, December 1934.
- Country: United States
- Language: English
- Genre: Fantasy

Publication
- Published in: Weird Tales
- Publication type: Pulp magazine
- Publisher: Popular Fiction Publishing Co.
- Media type: Print
- Publication date: December 1934
- Series: Zothique

"Xeethra" is a short story by American author Clark Ashton Smith as part of his Zothique cycle, and first published in the December 1934 issue of Weird Tales.

== Background ==
When editing the 1970 Smith collection Zothique, Lin Carter placed "Xeethra" as chronologically "the true beginning of events."

== Publication history ==
According to Emperor of Dreams: A Clark Ashton Smith Bibliography (1978) by Donald Sidney-Fryer, "Xeethra" was first published in the December 1934 issue of Weird Tales. It was included in the books Lost Worlds (1944) and Zothique (1970).

== Plot ==
In pastoral Cincor, the young Xeethra wanders his goat herd to an unknown plain. Despite it being late in the day, Xeethra decides to explore. Finding a cave, he follows it through a tunnel to a hidden valley. There he finds a weird field with unusual flora and two giants guarding it. Amid the flora, Xeethra takes a bite of strange fruit and realises he was long ago King Amero of the far-off Calyz. Returning to his guardian Pornos, he admits this realisation while admitting he strayed too far and quite late. While Pornos refutes this thought, he admits there are certain passageways to the underworld of Thassaidon, an evil god. The next day, Xeethra begins his journey to find his lost kingdom. Eventually stumbling across ancient ruins, he discovers the lepers amid the decay. The lepers tell him about the lost kingdom Calyz which passed ages ago. Wrought with grief and gazing at the star Canopus, the evil god Thassaidon shows himself to Xeethra. Offering a deal for his soul in return to living out the heyday of Calyz, Xeethra takes it up and relives that lost age as King Amero. While enjoyable at first, King Amero finds disaster ravages Calyz and grows weary of rule. Instead, he takes up entertainers as distraction. One musician plays a song about a far-off land called Cincor that is less traveled and more serene. Enamoured with this story, King Amero asks for passage to this land. Thus the cycle of story is closed as King Amero relives his life as Xeethra.

== Reception ==
In the 1981 book Twentieth-Century Science-Fiction Writers, Will Murray called it a "poignant story."

== See also ==
- Clark Ashton Smith bibliography
