= The Empire of the Necromancers =

- Short story by Clark Ashton Smith
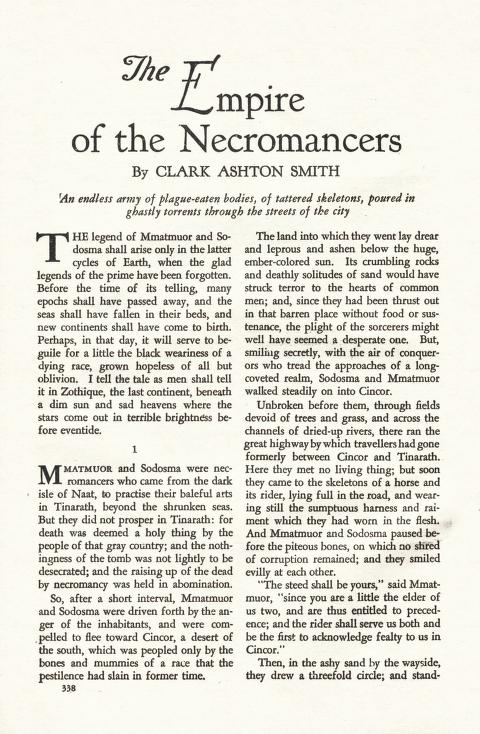
- Title page of "The Empire of the Necromancers" as it appeared in Weird Tales, September 1932.
- Country: United States
- Language: English
- Genre: Dark Fantasy

Publication
- Published in: Weird Tales
- Publication type: Pulp magazine
- Publisher: Popular Fiction Publishing Co.
- Media type: Print
- Publication date: September 1932
- Series: Zothique

"The Empire of the Necromancers" is a short story by American author Clark Ashton Smith as part of his Zothique cycle, and first published in the September 1932 issue of Weird Tales.

== Background ==
When editing the 1970 Smith collection Zothique, Lin Carter noted "The Empire of the Necromancers" as "the first to be published" of the Zothique cycle.

== Publication history ==
According to Emperor of Dreams: A Clark Ashton Smith Bibliography (1978) by Donald Sidney-Fryer, "The Empire of the Necromancers" was first published in the September 1932 issue of Weird Tales. It was included in the books Lost Worlds (1944), Zothique (1970); and the September 1948 issue of Avon Fantasy Reader.

== Plot ==
Two necromancers from the land of Naat, Mmatmuor and Sodosma, travel to Tinarath to exhume and reanimate the dead. They are soon shunned by its inhabitants and have to go elsewhere to continue their necromancy.

They go to Cincor, where they begin with a dead traveler and his horse they find on a road. Later, they begin reanimating more of the dead as they travel through Cincor until they arrive at what was once its capital, Yethlyreom. They take refuge in its palace and reanimate all of the dead to serve them. One of the animate dead, Illeiro, who was Cincor's last emperor, begins to remember his past life and resents his current subjugation under the two necromancers. As his self-awareness grows, Illeiro notices Mmatmuor and Sodosma growing lazier as they rely on the dead as servants.

Mmatmuor and Sodosma plan to use the dead as an army to take Tinarath and continue their necromancy across the rest of Zothique. When the necromancers are asleep, Illeiro seeks counsel with Hestaiyon, his ancestor and eldest of the Nimboth line of emperors. Hestaiyon struggles initially due to being undead, but he recalls a prophecy that he relates to Illeiro: Illeiro must shatter a clay image of an earth god so that he may retrieve a steel sword, a bronze key, and brass tablets. The brass tablets have instructions for using the sword and key: the sword is to slay the necromancers and the key unlocks a passageway to a hidden abyss.

Hestaiyon beheads both Mmatmuor and Sodosma in their sleep and quarters their bodies. Hestiayon then orders the dead that they no longer serve the two necromancers, and these orders are relayed to the rest of the dead. After learning this, the dead use the unlocked door to enter the final abyss while Hestaiyon casts a curse on the remains of Mmatmuor and Sodosma so they continue to be animate but in pieces. Then Hestaiyon and Illeiro enter the abyss and seal the door from the inside.

== Reception ==
Avon Fantasy Reader editor Donald A. Wollheim said "The Empire of the Necromancers" was "such a tale as only a master dreamer could conjure up".

== See also ==
- Clark Ashton Smith bibliography
