= The Isle of the Torturers =

- Short story by Clark Ashton Smith
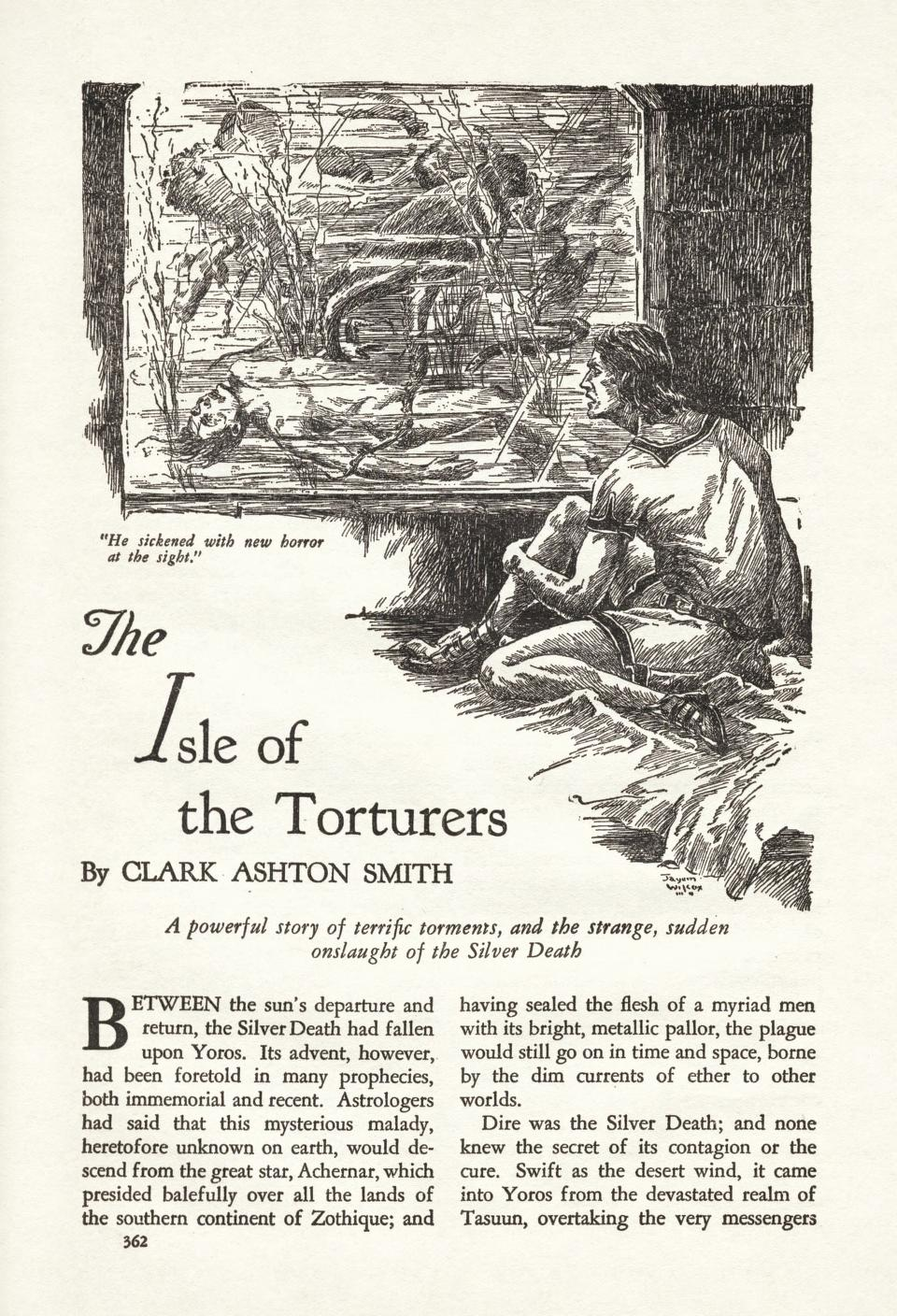
- Title page of "The Isle of the Torturers" as it appeared in Weird Tales, March 1933. Illustration by Jayem Wilcox.
- Country: United States
- Language: English
- Genre: Fantasy

Publication
- Published in: Weird Tales
- Publication type: Pulp magazine
- Publisher: Popular Fiction Publishing Co.
- Media type: Print
- Publication date: March 1933
- Series: Zothique

"The Isle of the Torturers" is a short story by American author Clark Ashton Smith as part of his Zothique cycle, and first published in the March 1933 issue of Weird Tales.

== Publication history ==
According to Emperor of Dreams: A Clark Ashton Smith Bibliography (1978) by Donald Sidney-Fryer, "The Isle of the Torturers" was first published in the March 1933 issue of Weird Tales. It was included in the books Keep on the Light (1933) edited by Christine Campbell Thomson as "Isle of Torturers", Lost Worlds (1944), and Zothique (1970).

== Plot ==
A long-foretold plague called the Silver Death comes from the star Achernar to Yoros. King Fulbra is protected by a magical ring made by his loyal sorcerer Vemdeez. The ring protects its wearer from illness and from spreading the plague, but the moment it is removed the Silver Death will return. Everyone in Yoros dies except Fulbra and three slaves. They set sail for the vassal state of Cyntrom. A storm drives them to Uccastrog, also known as the Isle of the Torturers. Fulbra meets Ildrac, king of Uccastrog. Ildrac refuses to allow Fulbra to leave and strips him of his weapons. As Fuldra is escorted to his room, he passes a girl, Ilvaa, who whispers in the language of Yoros that she wants to help him. From his room, Fulbra can see the bodies of his slaves floating in the sea. The next day, Ilvaa encourages Fulbra to endure the coming tortures and says that she will try to help him escape that evening. That evening, she visits Fulbra in his room. She says her plan has failed, but she will try again tomorrow. Fulbra survives another day of torture by thinking of Ilvaa. That night, Ilvaa does not come. The next day, while Fulbra is on a breaking wheel, Ilvaa mocks him for believing that she would help him. She prepares to feed him drugged wine that will take away his memories. Fulbra, wishing to die, decides to tempt Ildrac to remove the ring. He pretends to be afraid of what will happen if the ring is removed. Ildrac removes the ring and places it on his own finger. The Silver Death is unleashed, killing everyone except Ildrac. Ildrac, afraid that the ring is the source of the plague, throws it into the ocean and dies as well.

== Reception ==
Reviewing Lost Worlds in the 1983 book The Guide to Supernatural Fiction, E. F. Bleiler recommended the "best stories are "The Seven Geases", "The Isle of the Torturers", "Necromancy in Naat", which may well be Smith's three best weird stories." In the 1981 book Twentieth-Century Science-Fiction Writers, Will Murray appraised the story with "hope and futility are expertly balanced." Reviewing the March 1933 issue of Weird Tales in the 1977 book The Weird Tales Story, Robert Weinberg called it "the best story" and "had an especially effective ending."

== See also ==
- Clark Ashton Smith bibliography
