= The Charnel God =

- Short story by Clark Ashton Smith
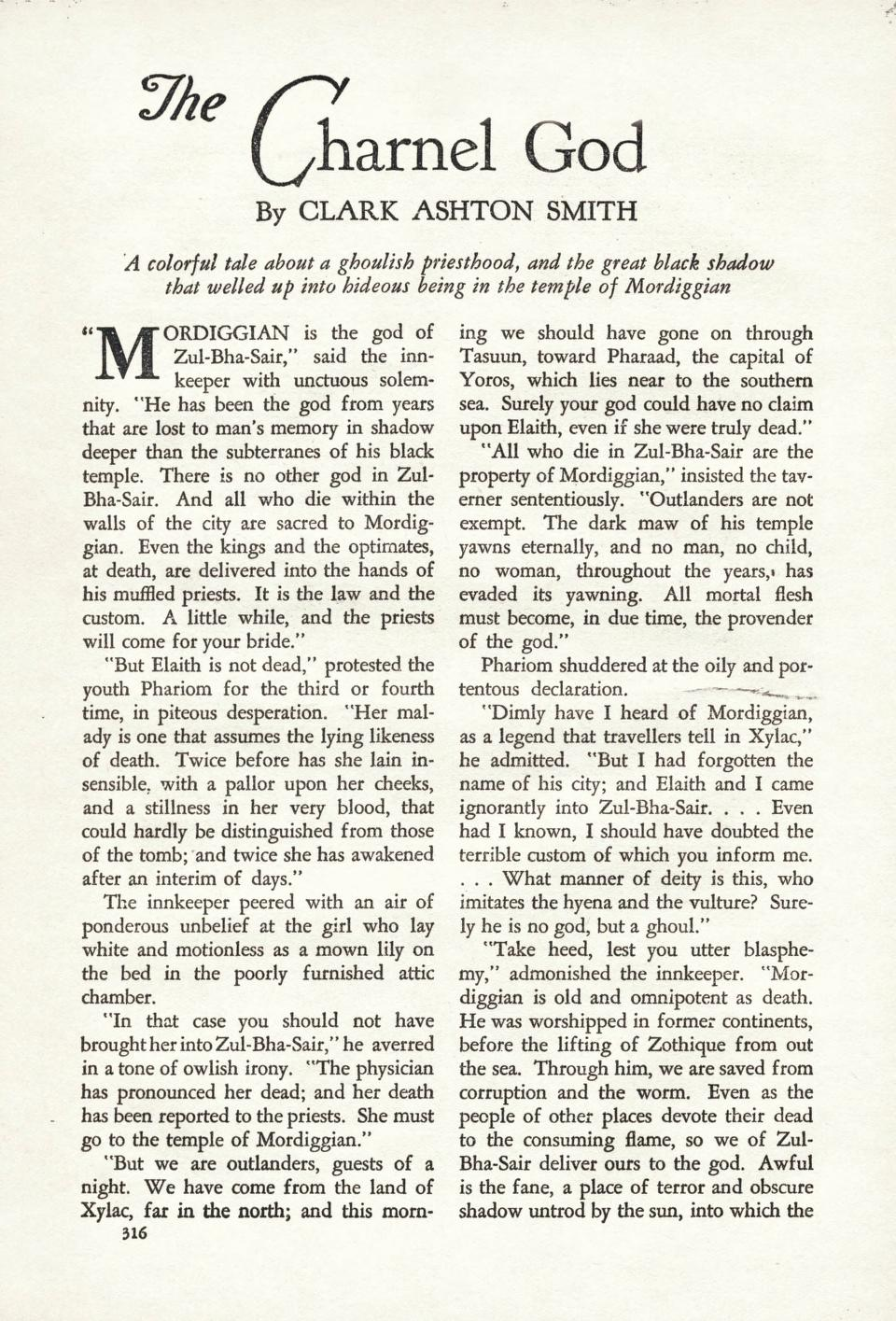
- Title page of "The Charnel God" as it appeared in Weird Tales, March 1934.
- Country: United States
- Language: English
- Genre: Dark Fantasy

Publication
- Published in: Weird Tales
- Publication type: Pulp magazine
- Publisher: Popular Fiction Publishing Co.
- Media type: Print
- Publication date: March 1934
- Series: Zothique

"The Charnel God" is a short story by American author Clark Ashton Smith as part of his Zothique cycle, and first published in the March 1934 issue of Weird Tales.

== Publication history ==
According to Emperor of Dreams: A Clark Ashton Smith Bibliography (1978) by Donald Sidney-Fryer, "The Charnel God" was first published in the March 1934 issue of Weird Tales. It was included in the books Genius Loci and Other Tales (1948) and Zothique (1970).

== Plot ==
The innkeeper tells Phariom, an outlander from Xylac traveling with his bride Elaith to Yoros, about the god of Zul-Bha-Sair, Mordiggian. Mordiggian devours all the dead in Zul-Bha-Sair. However, Phariom points out that Elaith is not dead but suffers from a malady that renders its victim near deathlike. Despite this, the innkeeper already informed the priests as they prepare to deliver her to the temple. Phariom tries to defend Elaith but is quickly matched by the priests in his defences. Phariom pays the innkeeper for his stay and decides to try to find where Elaith is kept. He learns from merchants in the bazaar that she is in the temple of Mordiggian. On his way to the temple, he notices a beautiful but dead woman is being delivered to the temple. He learns that the victim is princess Arctela. Planning on stealing Elaith from the priests, a sorcerer named Aenon-tha also plans the same. Between his two assistants Narghai and Vemba-taith, they debate whether to carry out the theft and how to do it. Later that night, while he tries to steal Elaith, Phariom finds the three in the process of their plan. Hiding from their sight, he then notices both Elaith and Arctela are missing. Following their footprints, he finds that three have reanimated Arctela and Vemba-tsith takes credit for reviving Elaith. When Phariom confronts them, Aenon-tha offers for them to join forces so they may escape together. Phariom declines the offer. Meanwhile, a great shadow appears which turns out to be Mordiggian. Helped by the priests, Mordiggian takes back Arctela and deals with three sorcerers. One of the priests proclaims to Phariom and Elaith that Mordiggian is fair, and the two are spared, while the sorcerers will be dealt with by the priests.

== Reception ==
Reviewing Genius Loci and Other Tales in the 1983 book The Guide to Supernatural Fiction, E. F. Bleiler recommended the "best stories are "The Ninth Skeleton", "The Phantoms of the Fire", which is well-handled if trite in theme, and "The Charnel God"."

== See also ==
- Clark Ashton Smith bibliography
