= The Dark Eidolon =

- Short story by Clark Ashton Smith
- Title page of "The Dark Eidolon" as it appeared in Weird Tales, January 1935. Illustration by Clark Ashton Smith.
- Country: United States
- Language: English
- Genre: dark fantasy

Publication
- Published in: Weird Tales
- Publication type: Pulp magazine
- Publisher: Popular Fiction Publishing Co.
- Media type: Print
- Publication date: January 1935
- Series: Zothique

"The Dark Eidolon" is a sword and sorcery short story by American writer Clark Ashton Smith, forming part of his Zothique cycle of stories. It was first published in Weird Tales in 1935 and has been variously republished, notably in the anthology The Spell of Seven, edited by L. Sprague de Camp.

Described by de Camp in his introduction to the story as 'one of the most horrible' of Smith's tales, it chronicles the life and death of the dread sorcerer Namirrha.

== Publication history ==
According to Emperor of Dreams: A Clark Ashton Smith Bibliography (1978) by Donald Sidney-Fryer, "The Dark Eidolon" was first published in the January 1935 issue of Weird Tales. It was included in the books Out of Space and Time (1944), The Spell of Seven (1965) edited by L. Sprague de Camp, and Zothique (1970).

== Plot synopsis ==
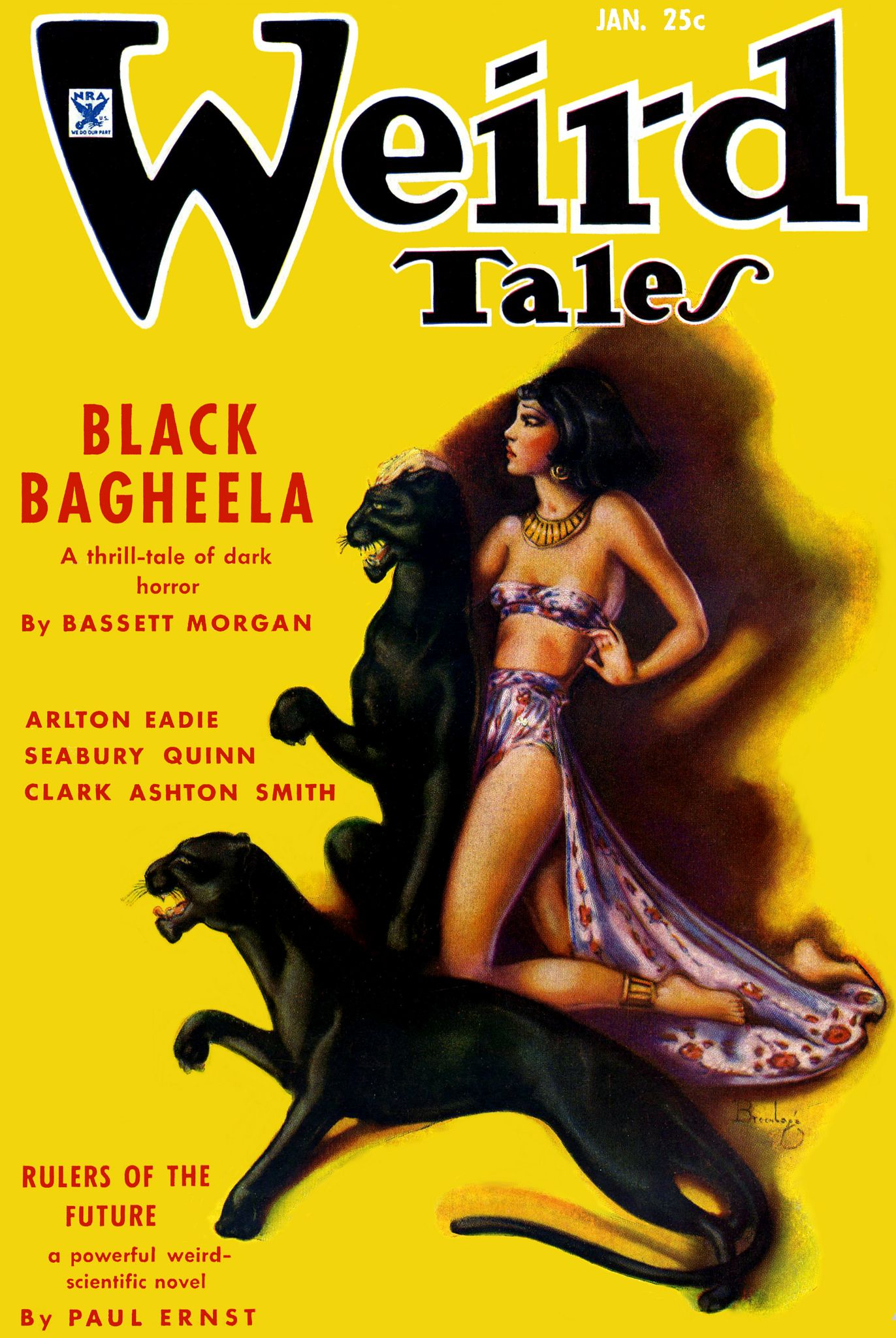
"The Dark Eidolon" was originally published in the January 1935 issue of Weird Tales.

Namirrha was once known as Narthos, a beggar boy of Ummaos, capital city of Xylac. Trampled almost to death by the horses of Prince Zotulla, he leaves the city and becomes a willing pupil of a wizard, driving his own bond with Thasaidon, Lord of the Seven Hells and God of Earthly Evil.

He becomes fabled as a mighty and dreaded necromancer/sorcerer, but is still driven to avenge himself against Zotulla. He returns to Xylac and constructs in one night a palace in view of that of Zotulla, now King of Xylac. Every night, phantom horses haunt Zotulla's palace, depriving all of sleep. Eventually, Namirrha seeks the aid of Thasaidon to destroy the king, but the arch-fiend refuses his request, stating that his intended revenge would deprive Thasaidon of a great number of loyal subjects.

Angrier than ever, he makes a pact with an even greater and more dangerous entity, Thamagorgos, Lord of the Abyss. He invites the king and his court to a great feast. While Zotulla is contemplating whether to go or not, a horde of decaying mummies with demonic rats in their chests, followed by gigantic skeletons, enter the hall. Ordering Zotulla and his mistress, Obexah, to follow them towards Namirrah's palace, the giant skeletons hypnotize the rest of the palace inhabitants with demonic silver flutes. They enter an impossibly huge chamber filled with demons and corpses. There, Obexah and Zotulla are seated next to Namirrha, and are served by victims of their own cruelty (Zotulla by his murdered father, and Obexah by her murdered lover). Soon, demon musicians and singers play, followed by gigantic horrifying dancers who crush all of the guests (who have been magically tied to the floor by a crimson fog).

Later, Namirrha takes Zotulla and his mistress to a balcony that is stunningly high above the earth. The mighty cosmic horses of Thamagorgos, at Namirrha's command, appear and literally tramples the entire city like ants, sparing only Namirrha's own palace. Namirrha reveals the reason for all of this destruction to the king. Zotulla's mistress is tied to an altar. Namirrha commands the king to drink a poisoned draught and does so himself; the spirit of the wizard enters Zotulla's body, and the helpless spirit of Zotulla is imprisoned in a statue of Thaisadon. Zotulla is then forced to watch as Namirrha tortures his mistress.

Zotulla wishes for the power to stop this, and Thasaidon, furious at Namirrha, grants Zotulla the power to smite Namirrha down. He strikes the wizard down with the mace in the statue's hand. By Thasaidon's command, the spirit of Zotulla goes free into oblivion, whilst that of Namirrha, who has offended him, returns to his body, bereft of memory and sense, and attacks his own reflection in a mirror (thinking it variantly Zotulla and himself, switching between identities and sanity). Obexah, screaming on the altar, laughs insanely, while the macrocosmic stallions of Thamagorgos return through the skies to crush the palace of Namirrha.

== Reception ==
Reviewing Out of Space and Time in the 1983 book The Guide to Supernatural Fiction, E. F. Bleiler remarked "The Dark Eidolon" and "The Weird of Avoosl Wuthoqquan" are "the best stories." In the 1988 book Fantasy: The 100 Best Books, James Cawthorn and Michael Moorcock said "the apex of incarnadined horror is achieved with 'The Dark Eidolon', the tale of a childhood injury avenged on a scale which would tax the visual resources of a major studio."
