= The Ninth Skeleton =

American short story

- Short story by Clark Ashton Smith

Text available at Wikisource
- Country: United States
- Language: English
- Genre: Horror short story

Publication
- Published in: Weird Tales
- Media type: Print (magazine)
- Publication date: September 1928

"The Ninth Skeleton" is a short story by American writer Clark Ashton Smith. It was first published in the September 1928 issue of Weird Tales. It was his first story for Weird Tales.

== Plot ==
The story tells of the experience of a man, Herbert, on his way to meet his girlfriend Guenevere, who experiences what seems to be a macabre vision of various skeletons, each of whom advances with a skeleton child in its arms. The ninth skeleton (of the title) has no infant skeleton, but is still in the grave, and attempts to pull the narrator in. However, he awakes to normal reality, apparently due to the touch of Guenevere on his arm.

The opening of the story features an accurate description of the area of Boulder Ridge in Auburn, California where Smith lived most of his early life.

== Reception ==
Reviewing Genius Loci and Other Tales in the 1983 book The Guide to Supernatural Fiction, E. F. Bleiler recommended the "best stories are "The Ninth Skeleton", "The Phantoms of the Fire", which is well-handled if trite in theme, and "The Charnel God"."
