= Poseidonis (collection) =

Short story collection by Clark Ashton Smith

- Cover of Poseidonis
- Editor: Lin Carter
- Author: Clark Ashton Smith
- Cover artist: Gervasio Gallardo
- Language: English
- Series: Ballantine Adult Fantasy series
- Genre: Fantasy
- Publisher: Ballantine Books
- Publication date: 1973
- Publication place: United States
- Media type: Print (paperback)
- Pages: 210
- ISBN: 0-345-03353-1
- OCLC: 3371683
- Preceded by: Xiccarph

Poseidonis is a collection of fantasy short stories by Clark Ashton Smith, edited by Lin Carter. It was first published in paperback by Ballantine Books as the fifty-ninth volume of its Ballantine Adult Fantasy series in July 1973. It was the fourth collection of Smith's works assembled by Carter for the series. The stories were originally published in various fantasy magazines in the 1930s and 1940s, notably Weird Tales.

== Summary ==
The book collects several prose poems, poems and tales, including stories from the author's Poseidonis cycle, set on a remnant of the lost continent of Atlantis, and others set in Lemuria or other realms.

== Contents ==
- "The Magic of Atlantis: An Introduction", by Lin Carter
- Poseidonis

- "Editor's Note"
- "The Muse of Atlantis" (prose poem)
- "The Last Incantation"
- "The Death of Malygris"
- "Tolometh" (poem)
- "The Double Shadow"
- "A Voyage to Sfanomoë"
- "A Vintage from Atlantis"
- "Atlantis: a poem" (poem)

- Lemuria

- "Editor's Note"
- "In Lemuria" (poem)
- "An Offering to the Moon"
- "The Uncharted Isle"
- "Lemurienne" (poem)

- Ptolemides

- "Editor's Note"
- "The Epiphany of Death"

- Other Realms

- "Editor's Note"
- "In Cocaigne" (prose poem)
- "Symposium of the Gorgon"
- "The Venus of Azombeii"
- "The Isle of Saturn" (poem)
- "The Root of Ampoi"
- "The Invisible City"
- "Amithaine" (poem)
- "The Willow Landscape"
- "The Shadows" (prose poem)

== Reception ==
The collection was reviewed (in French) by Daniel Walther in Fiction no, 322, 1981.
