= Hyperborea (collection) =

Collection of fantasy short stories by Clark Ashton Smith

- Cover of Hyperborea
- Author: Clark Ashton Smith
- Cover artist: Bill Martin
- Language: English
- Series: Ballantine Adult Fantasy series
- Genre: Fantasy
- Publisher: Ballantine Books
- Publication date: 1971
- Publication place: United States
- Media type: Print (paperback)
- Pages: xvi, 203
- ISBN: 0-345-02206-8
- Preceded by: Zothique
- Followed by: Xiccarph

Hyperborea is a collection of fantasy short stories by Clark Ashton Smith, edited by Lin Carter. It was first published in paperback by Ballantine Books as the twenty-ninth volume of its Ballantine Adult Fantasy series in April 1971. It was the second themed collection of Smith's works assembled by Carter for the series. The stories were originally published in various fantasy magazines from the 1930s to the 1950s, notably Weird Tales.

== Summary ==
The book collects one prose poem and ten tales of the author's Hyperborean cycle, set on a prehistoric lost northern continent Smith named for the mythological land of Hyperborea, with an introduction and map by Carter. One story from the sequence, the fragment "The House of Haon-Dor," is omitted. The editor also includes in the collection four additional tales of Smith's from what he took to be a similar but more fragmentary sequence of stories.

== Contents ==
- "Introduction" (Lin Carter)
- Hyperborea

- "The Muse of Hyperborea" (prose poem)
- "The Seven Geases"
- "The Weird of Avoosl Wuthoqquan"
- "The White Sybil"
- "The Testament of Athammaus"
- "The Coming of the White Worm"
- "Ubbo-Sathla"
- "The Door to Saturn"
- "The Ice-Demon"
- "The Tale of Satampra Zeiros"
- "The Theft of the Thirty-Nine Girdles"

- The World's Rim

- "The Abominations of Yondo"
- "The Desolation of Soom" (prose poem)
- "The Passing of Aphrodite" (prose poem)
- "The Memnons of the Night" (prose poem)

- "Notes on the Commoriom Myth-Cycle", by Lin Carter

== Reception ==
L. Sprague de Camp in Amra favoured the collection with "There has never been anyone like CAS." Fritz Leiber in Whispers critiqued "I do not fault Smith for using such words as "nefarious" and "cacodaemonic," and for sometimes using three words where one might do." Robert FitzOsbert in Luna Monthly said "Hyperborea, with all of Smith's work, is Dunsanean in vision, Lovecraftian in its brooding, even sinister atmosphere, almost Howard-like in evoking entire fantasy worlds more through patient cultivation of epic myth than through sterile pseudo-science that marks the worst of today's efforts in this genre."
