= The Death of Ilalotha =

- Short story by Clark Ashton Smith
- Title page of "The Death of Ilalotha" as it appeared in Weird Tales, September 1937. Illustration by Virgil Finlay.
- Country: United States
- Language: English
- Genre: Fantasy

Publication
- Published in: Weird Tales
- Publication type: Pulp magazine
- Publisher: Popular Fiction Publishing Co.
- Media type: Print
- Publication date: September 1937
- Series: Zothique

"The Death of Ilalotha" is a short story by American author Clark Ashton Smith as part of his Zothique cycle, and first published in the September 1937 issue of Weird Tales.

== Publication history ==
According to Emperor of Dreams: A Clark Ashton Smith Bibliography (1978) by Donald Sidney-Fryer, "The Death of Ilalotha" was first published in the September 1937 issue of Weird Tales. It was included in the books Out of Space and Time (1942) and Zothique (1970).

== Plot ==
Amid festivities, Ilalotha who is the lady-in-waiting to Queen Xantlicha dies of fatal passion. Lord Thulos who is in love with the queen discovers the body. Thulos is suspect since the queen poisoned King Archain and other lovers who do not please the queen. While servants dispatch the body to a necropolis near the palace, the queen and Lord Thulos plan to meet later. However, Thulos is concerned Ilalotha might be a witch. Later that night, Thulos awakes and remembers his appointment but worries he might be late. When he finds he is early, he decides to check the necropolis as he has suspicions Ilalotha might not be dead after all. Something dispatches Lord Thulos. Later, Queen Xantlicha goes to meet Lord Thulos but finds he is absent. Deciding he may have gone to check on Ilalotha, she goes to her tomb. There she finds an undead creature above the body of Lord Thulos. She then flees the tomb.

== Reception ==
In the 1977 book The Weird Tales Story, Robert Weinberg said "Clark Ashton Smith horrified in a grisly tale of love and sadism."

== See also ==
- Clark Ashton Smith bibliography
