= Xiccarph =

1972 collection of short stories by Clark Ashton Smith

- Cover of Xiccarph
- Author: Clark Ashton Smith
- Cover artist: Gervasio Gallardo
- Language: English
- Series: Ballantine Adult Fantasy series
- Genre: Fantasy, science fiction
- Published: 1972 (Ballantine Books)
- Publication place: United States
- Media type: Print (paperback)
- Pages: 247
- ISBN: 0-345-02501-6
- OCLC: 7030361
- Preceded by: Hyperborea
- Followed by: Poseidonis

Xiccarph is a collection of fantasy and science fiction short stories by American writer Clark Ashton Smith, edited by Lin Carter. It was first published in paperback by Ballantine Books as the forty-first volume of its Ballantine Adult Fantasy series in February 1972. It was the third collection of Smith's works assembled by Carter for the series. The stories were originally published in various fantasy and SF magazines in the 1930s, notably Weird Tales.

== Summary ==
The book collects three prose poems and eight tales, including stories from the author's Xiccarph and Mars cycles.

== Contents ==
- "Other Stars and Skies: An Introduction", by Lin Carter
- "To the Daemon: An Invocation" (prose poem)
- Xiccarph

- "The Maze of Maal Dweb"
- "The Flower-Women"

- Aihai

- "Vulthoom"
- "The Dweller in the Gulf"
- "The Vaults of Yoh-Vombis"

- Phandiom

- "The Doom of Antarion"

- Lophai

- "The Demon of the Flower"

- Satabbor

- "The Monster of the Prophecy"

- Beyond the Stars

- "Sadastor" (prose poem)
- "From the Crypts of Memory" (prose poem)

== Reception ==
The collection was reviewed by Charlie Brown in Locus no. 125, October 27, 1972.
