= The Tale of Satampra Zeiros =

- Short story by Clark Ashton Smith
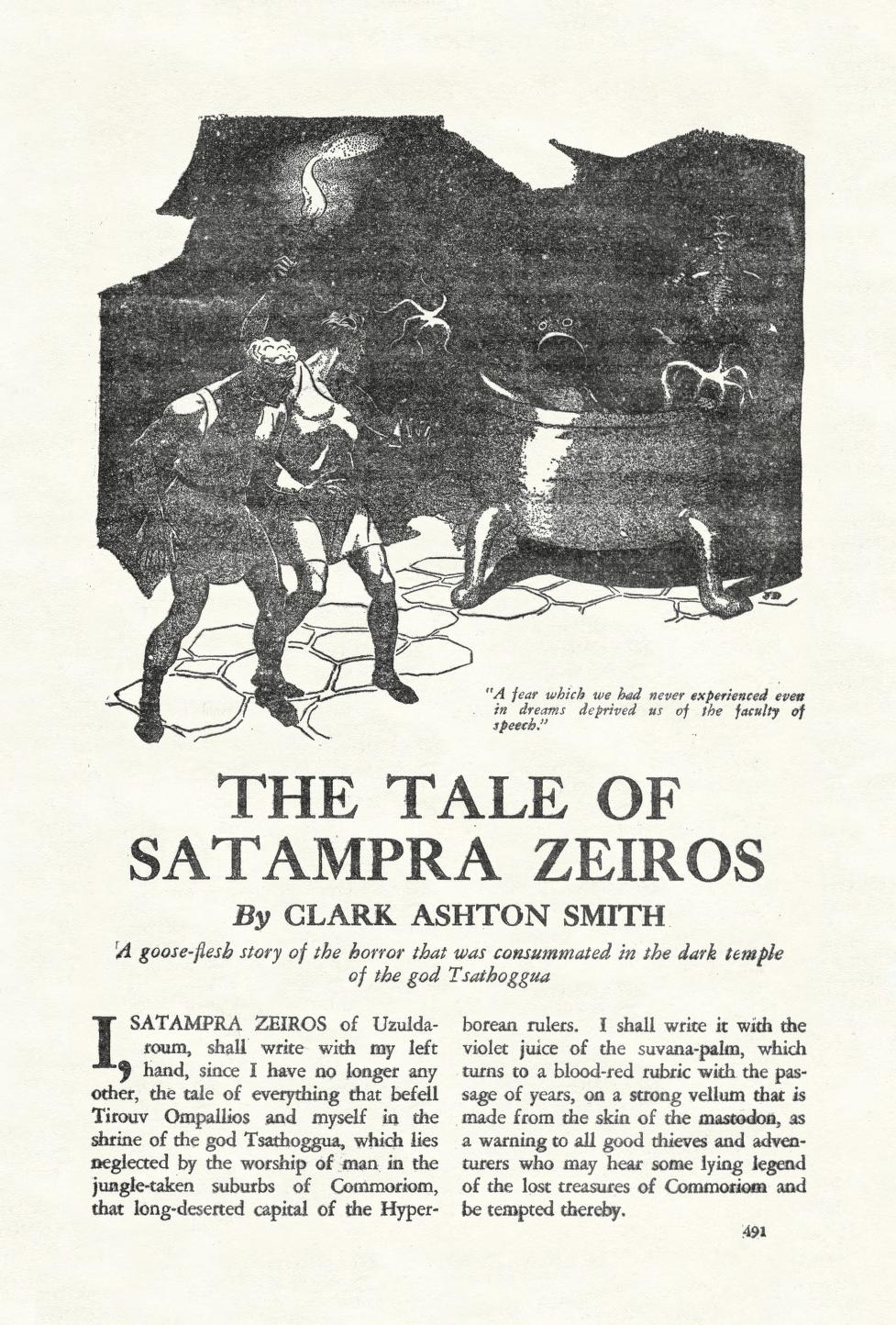
- Title page of "The Tale of Satampra Zeiros" as it appeared in Weird Tales, November 1931. Illustration by Joseph Doolin.
- Country: United States
- Language: English
- Genre: Fantasy

Publication
- Published in: Weird Tales
- Publication type: Pulp magazine
- Publisher: Popular Fiction Publishing Co.
- Media type: Print
- Publication date: November 1931
- Series: Hyperborean cycle

"The Tale of Satampra Zeiros" is a short story written in 1929 by American author Clark Ashton Smith as part of his Hyperborean cycle, and first published in the November 1931 issue of Weird Tales. It is the story in which Smith created the Cthulhu Mythos entity Tsathoggua.

== Publication history ==
According to Emperor of Dreams: A Clark Ashton Smith Bibliography (1978) by Donald Sidney-Fryer, "The Tale of Satampra Zeiros" was first published in the November 1931 issue of Weird Tales. It was included in the books Lost Worlds (1944), The Spawn of Cthulhu (1970), and Hyperborea (1971).

== Plot ==
The story is narrated by the thief Satampra Zeiros, who says he is writing with his left hand because he has lost his right. Zeiros and his companion Tirouv Ompallios are thieves living in the city of Uzuldaroum. They are short on money, so Zeiros suggests they plunder Commorium, the abandoned former capital city of Hyperborea. In Commorium, they stumble upon an ancient temple of the elder god Tsathoggua. The building is perfectly preserved except for a damaged lintel. A vast bronze basin stands in the middle of the temple, and a stone idol is on the far side. To their disappointment, the idol has no inset jewels. The basin contains a stinking, viscous, sooty liquid. The liquid rises out of the basin and shapes itself into a monster with an enormous head, tentacles, and a dozen legs. The monster hunts the thieves all night. At dawn the thieves realize they have circled back to the temple. They enter and bolt the door, but the monster pours in through the holes in the lintel. Zeiros hides behind the statue of the god, while Ompallios clambers into the basin. The monster engulfs Ompallios and silently digests him. Zeiros creeps to the door, but the noise of the bolt draws the creature's attention. A tentacle springs out of the basin and catches Zeiros's right wrist. As he stumbles out of the temple, the tentacle severs his hand and carries it to the basin.

== Inspiration ==
"Satampra Zeiros" is a story written in the style of Lord Dunsany, who wrote a similar tale of thievery gone wrong called "How Nuth Would Have Practiced His Art upon the Gnoles". Robert M. Price points to Dunsany's "Bethmoora", featuring another deserted city, as an additional likely inspiration.

== Reaction ==
When Smith sent his friend H. P. Lovecraft a copy of the unpublished manuscript, he responded with "well-nigh delirious delight.... You have achieved in its fullest glamour the exact Dunsanian touch which I find it almost impossible to duplicate.... Altogether, I think this comes close to being your high point in prose fiction to date...."

Writer Morgan T. Holmes described the tale as a "landmark story, as the first tale set in Hyperborea and the real beginning of Smith's sword and sorcery."
