= Avon Science Fiction and Fantasy Readers =

American fantasy magazine

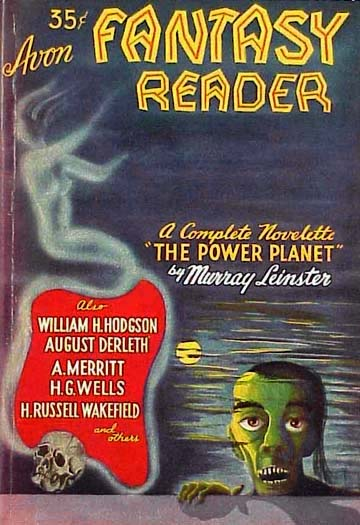
Cover of the first issue

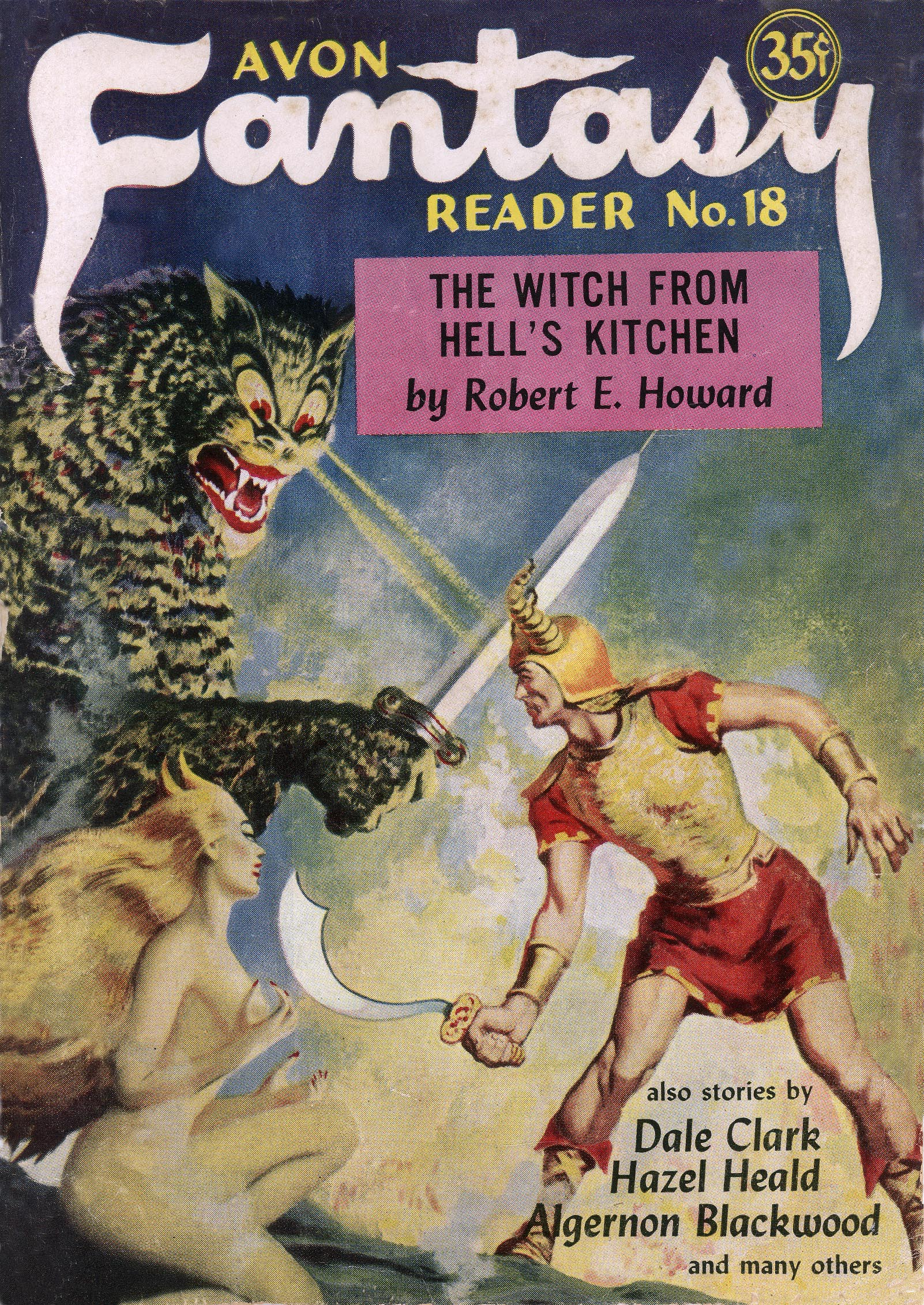
Cover of the eighteenth issue

Avon published three related magazines in the late 1940s and early 1950s, titled Avon Fantasy Reader, Avon Science Fiction Reader, and Avon Science Fiction and Fantasy Reader. These were digest size magazines (sometimes classed as a series of anthologies) which reprinted science fiction and fantasy literature by now well-known authors. They were edited by Donald A. Wollheim and published by Avon.

== Publication history ==
Avon Fantasy Reader
| | Jan | Feb | Mar | Apr | May | Jun | Jul | Aug | Sep | Oct | Nov | Dec |
|---|---|---|---|---|---|---|---|---|---|---|---|---|
| 1947 | | #1 | | | #2 | | #3 | | #4 | | #5 | |
| 1948 | | | #6 | | | | #7 | | | | #8 | |
| 1949 | | | #9 | | | | #10 | | | | #11 | |
| 1950 | | | #12 | | | | #13 | | | | #14 | |
| 1951 | | | #15 | | | | #16 | | | | #17 | |
| 1952 | | | #18 | | | | | | | | | |
Avon Science Fiction Reader
| 1951 | | | | #1 | | | | #2 | | | | |
| 1952 | | #3 | | | | | | | | | | |
Avon Science Fiction and Fantasy Reader
| 1953 | #1 | | | #2 | | | | | | | | |
Issues of the three Avon Readers. The editor for the first two Readers was Donald A. Wollheim; the editor for the Science Fiction and Fantasy Reader was Sol Cohen. (Note: Ashley gives a grid with specific months and years for the Fantasy Reader and Science Fiction Reader, and those months are reflected in the grid. However, he also says that the dates were irregular, and the Galactic Central grid does not gives dates for those two series. The Science Fiction and Fantasy Reader series was dated on the cover.)

In 1946 Donald Wollheim was working for Ace Magazines, but asked rival publisher Avon if they were interested in a fantasy title. Herbert Williams, Avon's editor, agreed and Wollheim compiled an anthology, titled Fantasy Reader. The title page was dated February 1947, and it was originally intended to appear every other month, like a magazine, but the schedule was rarely regular; each issue was delayed until the previous one had turned a profit. Both Wollheim and Meyers considered the Reader to be a book series, but perhaps because the format was similar to a digest magazine, it has commonly been treated by bibliographers as a magazine.

The first Reader sold well, and Wollheim was quickly hired, and shortly took over Williams' position when Joseph Meyers, the publisher, let Williams go. At the end of 1947, Meyers reduced the quality of the paper stock used for the glossy cover, to save money, and changed the binding from perfect to saddle-stapled.

In 1951 Wollheim and Meyers began a companion series, Avon Science Fiction Reader, again as an anthology series, but like the Fantasy Reader usually treated as a magazine by historians. This lasted for three issues, but in 1952 Wollheim, who disliked his job, left Avon to return to Ace, in order to start Ace Books. Meyers responding by merging the two series into one, titled Avon Science Fiction and Fantasy Reader, edited by Sol Cohen, but only two issues appeared, both in 1953.

== Contents and reception ==
Because Wollheim considered the series to be independent anthologies, rather than a magazine, he never included serials. Most of the contents of the Fantasy Reader were reprints, ranging from 19th century stories by M.R. James and Ambrose Bierce right up to the 1940s. He drew on magazine sources such as Weird Tales, All-Story, Astounding Science-Fiction, and Amazing Stories, but he also reprinted material that had previously only seen print in book form. Occasionally he obtained first publication rights: for example he printed two stories by Fritz Leiber, "The Man Who Never Grew Young" and "The Dreams of Albert Moreland", before they appeared in Leiber's Night's Black Agents.

The Science Fiction Reader also relied heavily on reprints, and drew its material mostly from the pulp magazines from the 1920s onwards. Two exceptions were stories by Lord Dunsany and S. Fowler Wright; both had appeared in editions from Arkham House, a publisher that Wollheim had a good relationship with.

Avon strived to bring readers little known stories by then little recognized writers such as H. P. Lovecraft, Ray Bradbury, C. L. Moore, A. Merritt, Murray Leinster and William Hope Hodgson.

== Bibliographic details ==
All three magazines were published by Avon, under different company names: Avon Book Company from 1947 to 1948; Avon Publishing Co., Inc. from 1948 to 1949, and Avon Novels, Inc. from 1949 on, including all the issues of the Science Fiction Reader and Science Fiction and Fantasy Reader. There were eighteen issues of the Fantasy Reader and three of the Science Fiction Reader; both were edited by Donald A. Wollheim. Sol Cohen was the editor of the two issues of the Science Fiction and Fantasy Reader. All were in digest format; the first five issues of the Fantasy Reader were perfect bound; all remaining issues were saddle-stapled, as were all issues of the other two titles. Every issue of each title was 128 pages and priced at 35 cents.

In 1969 Avon Books published two paperback books of selections from the original series, each also called The Avon Fantasy Reader and credited to Donald A. Wollheim and George Ernsberger as editors. The latter, Avon's science fiction editor then, made the selections and contributed a foreword to each.

== Sources ==
- Ashley, Mike (2000). The Time Machines: The Story of the Science-Fiction Pulp Magazines from the beginning to 1950. Liverpool: Liverpool University Press. ISBN 0-85323-865-0.
- Clareson, Thomas D. (1985a). "Avon Fantasy Reader". In Tymn, Marshall B.; Ashley, Mike (eds.). Science Fiction, Fantasy and Weird Fiction Magazines. Westport, Connecticut: Greenwood Press. pp. 127–132. ISBN 0-313-21221-X.
- Clareson, Thomas D. (1985b). "Avon Science Fiction and Fantasy Reader". In Tymn, Marshall B.; Ashley, Mike (eds.). Science Fiction, Fantasy and Weird Fiction Magazines. Westport, Connecticut: Greenwood Press. pp. 132–134. ISBN 0-313-21221-X.
- Clareson, Thomas D. (1985c). "Avon Science Fiction Reader". In Tymn, Marshall B.; Ashley, Mike (eds.). Science Fiction, Fantasy and Weird Fiction Magazines. Westport, Connecticut: Greenwood Press. pp. 134–135. ISBN 0-313-21221-X.
- Knight, Damon (1977). The Futurians. New York: John Day (Book Club Edition).
