= Zothique (collection) =

Book by Clark Ashton Smith

- Cover of Zothique
- Author: Clark Ashton Smith
- Cover artist: George Barr
- Language: English
- Series: Ballantine Adult Fantasy series
- Genre: Dark fantasy
- Published: 1970 (Ballantine Books)
- Publication place: United States
- Media type: Print (paperback)
- Pages: xiii, 273 pp
- ISBN: 0-345-01938-5
- OCLC: 427117
- Followed by: Hyperborea

Zothique is a collection of fantasy short stories by Clark Ashton Smith, edited by Lin Carter. It was first published in paperback by Ballantine Books as the sixteenth volume of its Ballantine Adult Fantasy series in June 1970. It was the first themed collection of Smith's works assembled by Carter for the series. The stories were originally published in various fantasy magazines in the 1930s, notably Weird Tales.

== Background ==
The book collects one poem and all sixteen tales of the author's Zothique cycle, with an introduction, map, and epilogue by Carter. They are an example of the Dying Earth genre, being set on the Earth's "last continent" in a far distant future. They were originally written and published between 1932 and 1951. Most were written in a tar paper and wood cabin in Auburn, California. All were first published in the magazine Weird Tales, with the exception of "The Voyage of King Euvoran" which first appeared in the 1933 book The Double Shadow and Other Fantasies and later republished under the title "The Quest of Gazolba" in the September 1947 issue.

== Setting ==
Map drawn by Tim Kirk.

Clark Ashton Smith himself described the Zothique cycle in a letter to L. Sprague de Camp, dated November 3, 1953:

Zothique, vaguely suggested by Theosophic theories about past and future continents, is the last inhabited continent of earth. The continents of our present cycle have sunken, perhaps several times. Some have remained submerged; others have re-risen, partially, and re-arranged themselves. Zothique, as I conceive it, comprises Asia Minor, Arabia, Persia, India, parts of northern and eastern Africa, and much of the Indonesian archipelago. A new Australia exists somewhere to the south. To the west, there are only a few known islands, such as Naat, in which the black cannibals survive. To the north, are immense unexplored deserts; to the east, an immense unvoyaged sea. The peoples are mainly of Aryan or Semitic descent; but there is a negro kingdom (Ilcar) in the north-west; and scattered blacks are found throughout the other countries, mainly in palace-harems. In the southern islands survive vestiges of Indonesian or Malayan races. The science and machinery of our present civilization have long been forgotten, together with our present religions. But many gods are worshipped; and sorcery and demonism prevail again as in ancient days. Oars and sails alone are used by mariners. There are no fire-arms—only the bows, arrows, swords, javelins, etc. of antiquity. The chief language spoken (of which I have provided examples in an unpublished drama) is based on Indo-European roots and is highly inflected, like Sanskrit, Greek and Latin.

Darrell Schweitzer suggests the idea of writing about a far future land may have come from William Hope Hodgson's novel The Night Land, noting that Smith was an admirer of Hodgson's work. However, this theory was conclusively disproven by Scott Conner in a scholarly journal devoted to Hodgson.

== Contents ==
- "About Zothique, and Clark Ashton Smith: When the World Grows Old" (1970) by Lin Carter
- "Zothique" (poem, 1951)
- "Xeethra" (1934)
- "Necromancy in Naat" (1936)
- "The Empire of the Necromancers" (1932)
- "The Master of the Crabs" (1948)
- "The Death of Ilalotha" (1937)
- "The Weaver in the Vault" (1934)
- "The Witchcraft of Ulua" (1934)
- "The Charnel God" (1934)
- "The Dark Eidolon" (1935)
- "Morthylla" (1953)
- "The Black Abbot of Puthuum" (1936)
- "The Tomb-Spawn" (1934)
- "The Last Hieroglyph" (1935)
- "The Isle of the Torturers" (1933)
- "The Garden of Adompha" (1938)
- "The Voyage of King Euvoran" (1933)
- "Epilogue: The Sequence of the Zothique Tales" (1970) by Lin Carter

== Reception ==
Locus's Charles N. Brown wrote "Smith would never use a word when a paragraph would do and, I'm afraid, I gave up after 20 pages." In the 1988 book Fantasy: The 100 Best Books, James Cawthorn and Michael Moorcock said "Smith crams enough colour and outré incident into a short story to fill the average novel." Amra's L. Sprague de Camp favoured the collection with "all sixteen Zothique stories, plus a poem, by the master of the macabre in jewel-bedizened proze, about sorcerous doings on the earth's last continent." Bizarre Fantasy Tales's Robert A. W. Lowndes opined "The best introduction to Clark Ashton Smith presently available is the Ballantine, softcover edition of the Zothique series." Forgotten Fantasy's Douglas Menville commended "one of the best volumes so far in the excellent Adult Fantasy series, edited by Lin Carter, this is the first paperback collection ever published of the wonderful weird tales of Clark Ashton Smith." Sci Fi Weekly's Cynthia Ward noted "while it's a fascinating and influential place, deserving of the fantasy or horror fan's visit, Zothique is, to paraphrase James Brown, a straight white man's man's man's world." The Magazine of Fantasy & Science Fiction's Gahan Wilson remarked "Mr. Carter has arranged these fascinatingly morbid fantasies in a perfectly chronological order so the thing may be read as a novel, if you like."
