= Twentieth-Century Science-Fiction Writers =

- Hardcover edition
- Author: Curtis C. Smith
- Language: English
- Series: Twentieth-Century Writers of the English Language
- Subject: Science fiction authors
- Genre: Non-fiction
- Publisher: St. Martin's Press
- Publication date: October 1981
- Publication place: United States
- Media type: Print (hardcover)
- Pages: 642 pp. (1981 edition)
- ISBN: 0-312-82420-3 (1981 edition)

Twentieth-Century Science-Fiction Writers is a book by Curtis C. Smith published in October 1981 on science fiction authors in the 20th century. It is the third in the St. Martin's Press's Twentieth-Century Writers of the English Language series with the others being Twentieth-Century Crime and Mystery Writers and Twentieth-Century Children's Writers.

Second edition, also edited by Curtis Smith, was published in 1986, and a third, edited by Noelle Watson and Paul E. Schellinger and retitled to St. James Guide to Science Fiction Writers, in 1991, and a fourth, edited by Jay P. Pederson, in 1996. From the third edition, 19th century writers have also been included.

== Background ==
Curtis C. Smith (Associate Professor of Humanities at University of Houston–Clear Lake in Clear Lake City) worked on the book for more than three years assisted by 20 advisers and 146 contributors. All living authors were sent a questionnaire for biographical information and that information was cross-checked.

== Content ==
In the first edition, there are 540 entries for Anglo-American writers, 35 additional foreign language writers, and five "major fantasy writers."

Anglo-American writer entries contain a biographical sketch besides including the address of the author or sometimes their literary agent. The bibliographies lists SF books, other publications, and published bibliographies of the author.

== Reception ==
Twentieth-Century Science-Fiction Writers was mainly received positively by critics but was critiqued for its bibliographical errors. Likewise, many gawked at its original $65 price. Science Fiction & Fantasy Book Review's Neil Barron reviewed Twentieth-Century Science-Fiction Writers with "the bibliography which follows is relatively thorough." Foundation's John Clute critiqued it with "I for one feel a sense of complex emotional and intellectual betrayal on contemplating the book." Locus's Jeff Frane critiqued the errors as missing, miscategorized, or mistitled entries but reviewed it favorably with "In spite of its flaws, it's a useful volume, one worth gaining access to somehow." Isaac Asimov's Science Fiction Magazine's Baird Searles commented "In all, I judge it to be a source of much information even for the non-academic general reader" but disclaimed that he contributed three articles and was listed as an adviser.

Neil Barron was quite critical of the fourth edition, considering it inferior to second edition of The Encyclopedia of Science Fiction, with the quality of entries in the reviewed book much more random.
