= Emperor of Dreams: A Clark Ashton Smith Bibliography =

1978 book by Donald Sidney-Fryer

- Author: Donald Sidney-Fryer
- Cover artist: Ned Dameron
- Language: English
- Subject: Clark Ashton Smith
- Publisher: Donald M. Grant, Publisher, Inc.
- Publication date: 1978
- Publication place: United States
- Media type: Print (Hardback)
- Pages: 303 pp
- OCLC: 5051531

Emperor of Dreams: A Clark Ashton Smith Bibliography is a 1978 bibliography of Clark Ashton Smith by Donald Sidney-Fryer. Literary critic S. T. Joshi called it "a towering work of research," and Ashton Smith scholars David E. Schultz and Scott Connors considered Emperor of Dreams "The foundation upon which all Smith scholarship rests."

== Writing and publishing the book ==
According to Sidney-Fryer's autobiography Hobgoblin Apollo, he began serious research for this bibliography in 1960-1961. He completed the book's typescript in 1965.

Sidney-Fryer found a publisher willing to publish his book in the "mid-1960s", but the publisher took more than ten years to bring it out. Emperor of Dreams was first published by Donald M. Grant, Publisher, Inc. in 1978 in an edition of 1,375 copies.

== Supplementary contents ==
Sidney-Fryer intended Emperor of Dreams to provide non-bibliographic information as well. "I purposed it as more than just a bibliography: It would also be a compendium of all kinds of information about C.A.S. . . ." Sidney-Fryer wrote. In addition to bibliographical data, the volume contains 13 photographs of sites relevant to Smith's life or that inspired his works; memoirs of Smith by people who knew him; critical evaluations of his writings; influences on Smith's writings; and writers influenced by Smith.

The book includes three longer essays:

- "Principal Facts of Biography" by Donald Sidney Fryer (which, in addition to biographical information about Smith describes writers who influenced him and writers that he influemced).
- "Clark Ashton Smith--In Memory of a Great Friendship" by Eric Barker.
- "Five Approaches to the Achievements of Clark Ashton Smith--Cosmic Master Artist" by Marvin R. Hiemstra.

Fourteen one-to-three page essay-letters are sprinkled throughout the book by Ray Bradbury, Stanton A. Coblentz, Avram Davidson, August Derleth, Harlan Ellison, Madelynne Greene, George F. Haas, Ethel Heiple, Rah Hoffman, Fritz Leiber, Sam Moskowitz, H. Warner Munn, E. Hoffmann Price, and Genevieve Sully.

Emperor of Dreams also includes four portraits of Clark Ashton Smith: two photographs by Arnold Genthe and Paul Freehafer, a caricature by Virgil Partch, and a color painting by Ned Dameron.

== Current status ==
While bibliographically the Sidney-Fryer is now superseded by the fully-indexed compilation Clark Ashton Smith: A Comprehensive Bibliography by S.T. Joshi, David E. Schultz and Scott Connors (New York: Hippocampus Press, 2020), Sidney-Fryer's work remains foundational and useful for its supplementary materials.
