= The Spook's Apprentice =

2004 children's novel by Joseph Delaney

- First edition cover
- Author: Joseph Delaney
- Illustrator: David Wyatt
- Language: English
- Series: The Wardstone Chronicles of Spook's
- Release number: 1st in series
- Genre: Children's literature; dark fantasy
- Publisher: The Bodley Head
- Publication date: 2004
- Publication place: United Kingdom
- Media type: Print (hardcover)
- Pages: 324
- ISBN: 978-0-370-32826-3
- OCLC: 56067496
- Followed by: The Spook's Curse

The Spook's Apprentice, published as The Last Apprentice: Revenge of the Witch in the United States, is a 2004 children's dark fantasy novel by Joseph Delaney. It was published by The Bodley Head and Red Fox in the United Kingdom, and by Greenwillow Books in the United States. It is the first book in The Wardstone Chronicles, the first arc of the Spook's series. The book has sold more than 3 million copies and won the Sefton Book Award, the Hampshire Book Award and the Prix Plaisirs de Lire. It was adapted into a play script, the feature film Seventh Son, and a French graphic novel.

The novel follows Thomas "Tom" Ward, a 12-year-old farm boy from the County, a fictional area based on Lancashire. As the seventh son of a seventh son, Tom can see ghosts, boggarts, ghasts and other supernatural creatures, which leads to his apprenticeship under John Gregory, the County's Spook.

== Plot ==
Thomas "Tom" Ward lives with his family in the County, a fictional area based on Lancashire. Because he is the seventh son of a seventh son, Tom can see ghosts and other supernatural beings. His parents apprentice him to John Gregory, the County's Spook, who travels through the area dealing with boggarts, ghosts, ghasts and witches. Tom's mother, known as Mam, had written to the Spook shortly after Tom's birth, telling him that Tom was the seventh son of a seventh son and promising that he would be the Spook's best and last apprentice.

The Spook tells Tom that most of his previous apprentices have failed through fear, disobedience or death. One of them, Billy Bradley, died after a boggart bit off his finger. Tom goes to live at the Spook's house in Chipenden, which is guarded by a boggart bound by an agreement with the Spook. The boggart protects the house, kills intruders and performs household tasks, while visitors who have not been invited must wait outside and use a bell system to summon the Spook.

Tom is sent to collect food from the grocer and is warned not to speak to girls wearing pointy shoes, which the Spook regards as a sign of witchcraft. On the way back, several boys threaten him until Alice Deane, a girl wearing pointy shoes, frightens them away. Alice is connected to two dangerous Pendle witches, Mother Malkin and Bony Lizzie. Her family links place her between the Deane and Malkin clans, two of the three Pendle witch clans.

Alice tricks Tom into giving cakes containing blood to Mother Malkin, who has been imprisoned by the Spook in a pit in his garden. The blood strengthens Malkin and allows her to escape. Bony Lizzie, a bone witch who has been training Alice, intends to use Malkin's escape as part of a plan to kill the Spook. Lizzie is aided by Tusk, an abhuman and the son of Mother Malkin.

Alice becomes uneasy with the cruelty of her relatives and begins to help Tom. Gregory remains suspicious of her because she is a witch and still uses dark magic. Gregory kills Tusk by stabbing him through the forehead. Tom later appears to kill Malkin with his rowan staff, its silver-alloy blade and running water, all of which are dangerous to witches. Malkin survives as a dead witch by entering and controlling other bodies. The Spook tells Tom that a witch can be finally destroyed only if the witch's heart is eaten or the body is burned.

The novel ends with Malkin chasing Tom back to his family's farm. Tom weakens her with salt and iron, and she flees into a pig pen, where she is eaten by pigs. Tom remains Gregory's apprentice, while Alice is accepted as an uneasy ally.

== Characters ==
- Thomas Jason "Tom" Ward: apprentice to John Gregory and a seventh son of a seventh son.
- John Gregory: the Spook for the County and Tom's mentor. He was formerly a priest and is also a seventh son of a seventh son.
- Alice Deane: a young witch who befriends Tom.
- Bony Lizzie: a malevolent witch, Alice's former teacher and her aunt. She practises bone magic.
- Mother Malkin: Bony Lizzie's aunt and a malevolent witch who was bound in a pit by the Spook.
- Tusk: the abhuman son of Mother Malkin.
- Mam: Tom's mother, who appears to have knowledge of future events.
- John Ward: Tom's father, a farmer and former sailor.
- Jack Ward: Tom's oldest brother, who inherits the family farm, except for one room set aside for Tom.
- James Ward: Tom's second oldest brother, a blacksmith.
- Ellie Ward: Jack's wife.
- Mary Ward: the young daughter of Jack and Ellie.
- Father Gregory: the Spook's brother, from whom he has been estranged for more than forty years.

== Development ==
After moving to Stalmine in 1983, Joseph Delaney found local accounts of a boggart said to have been discovered there by a priest. He recorded the story, which later became one source for the novel.

Delaney had previously written under the pseudonym J. K. Haderack. After his science fiction and fantasy novels for adults did not find a publisher, his agent advised him to try writing for younger readers to meet a children's publisher's brief. Delaney returned to a story he had written in 1993, using the Stalmine boggart account and elements of Lancashire's folklore, history and geography. He also used memories and experiences from his childhood.

== Publication ==
The Spook's Apprentice was published in the United Kingdom in 2004 under Delaney's own name. The hardback edition was published by The Bodley Head, with illustrations by David Wyatt. An audiobook version, read by Jamie Glover, was published by Random House Audio. A paperback edition was published by Red Fox in 2005. The American edition, titled The Last Apprentice: Revenge of the Witch, was published by Greenwillow Books, with illustrations by Patrick Arrasmith.

== Reception ==
The Spook's Apprentice has sold more than 3 million copies. It won the Sefton Book Award, the Hampshire Book Award and the Prix Plaisirs de Lire, and was shortlisted for the Lancashire Book of the Year award.

A review in The Guardian gave the book nine out of ten, describing it as suitable for readers aged ten and above, while noting some pacing issues. Fantasy Book Review gave the book ten out of ten and praised Delaney's descriptions and characterisation. Lawrence Downes, writing for The New York Times, stated that Delaney's narrative builds suspense through eerie encounters and Patrick Arrasmith's illustrations, but that the story sometimes relies too much on exposition.

== Adaptations ==
In 2014, The Spook's Apprentice - Play Edition, a 160-page play script adaptation, was published. It was written by Stephen Delaney, Joseph Delaney's son, in collaboration with his father.

A film adaptation of the novel, titled Seventh Son, was released by Legendary Pictures. It was directed by Sergey Bodrov. Ben Barnes played Tom Ward, with Jeff Bridges as the Spook, Julianne Moore as Mother Malkin, Alicia Vikander as Alice Deane, Kit Harington as Billy Bradley, Djimon Hounsou as Radu, an original character, and Antje Traue as Bony Lizzie.

In 2023, a French graphic novel adaptation, titled L'Épouvanteur, Tome 1: L'Apprenti épouvanteur, was released. It was written by Pierre Oertel and illustrated by Benjamin Bachelier.
