= Spook's =

Children's dark fantasy series by Joseph Delaney

- Hardback covers of The Wardstone Chronicles, the first arc in the series
- The Wardstone Chronicles: The Spook's Apprentice (2004); The Spook's Curse (2005); The Spook's Secret (2006); The Spook's Battle (2007); The Spook's Mistake (2008); The Spook's Sacrifice (2009); The Spook's Nightmare (2010); The Spook's Destiny (2011); Spook's: I Am Grimalkin (2011); The Spook's Blood (2012); Spook's: Slither's Tale (2012); Spook's: Alice (2013); The Spook's Revenge (2013); The Starblade Chronicles: Spook's: A New Darkness (2014); Spook's: The Dark Army (2016); Spook's: The Dark Assassin (2017); Brother Wulf: Brother Wulf (2020); Brother Wulf: Wulf's Bane (2021); Brother Wulf: The Last Spook (2022); Brother Wulf: Wulf's War (2023)
- Author: Joseph Delaney
- Illustrator: UK: David Wyatt and Julek Heller; US: Patrick Arrasmith, Tim Foley and Julek Heller
- Country: United Kingdom
- Language: English
- Genre: Children's literature, dark fantasy
- Publisher: UK: The Bodley Head; Red Fox; Puffin Books; US: Greenwillow Books
- Published: 2004–2013 (The Wardstone Chronicles); 2014–2017 (The Starblade Chronicles); 2020–2023 (Brother Wulf)
- Media type: Print (hardback and paperback); Audiobook; E-book
- No. of books: 20 + related works

Spook's, published as The Last Apprentice in the United States, is a children's dark fantasy series by the English author Joseph Delaney. It is published by imprints of Penguin Random House in the United Kingdom and HarperCollins in the United States. The series has been published in 30 countries, with sales exceeding 4.5 million copies. It began in 2004 with The Spook's Apprentice, which was later adapted as a play script, a feature film titled Seventh Son, and a French graphic novel.

The main series consists of 20 books in three arcs. The Wardstone Chronicles follows Thomas "Tom" Ward, who becomes apprentice to John Gregory, the spook of the County, a fictionalised version of Lancashire. Tom is trained to deal with supernatural threats and later becomes involved in a wider conflict with the Fiend. The Starblade Chronicles continues Tom Ward's story after he becomes a spook and takes on his own apprentice, Jenny. Brother Wulf follows Brother Wulf, a novice monk, and Tom Ward.

Several related works are set in the same fictional world, including short story collections, a bestiary and novellas.

== Overview ==
The Wardstone Chronicles, published from 2004 to 2013, follows Thomas "Tom" Ward, the seventh son of a seventh son, who is apprenticed to the County's spook, John Gregory. Gregory teaches him how to deal with ghosts, ghasts, witches, boggarts and other beings associated with the Dark.

Tom learns that most of Gregory's former apprentices failed, with some killed during their training. As the arc continues, other characters become more central to the story, including the young witch Alice Deane and the witch assassin Grimalkin. The arc follows Tom's role in the conflict with the Fiend, the father of all evil.

The County is based on Lancashire in the North of England. Several fictional towns in the books are based on real places: Priestown is based on Preston, where Delaney was born; Caster is based on Lancaster; Black Pool is based on Blackpool; and Chipenden is based on Chipping.

The Starblade Chronicles, a trilogy published from 2014 to 2017, continues Tom Ward's story after the end of his apprenticeship. Tom works as a spook and trains Jenny, his own apprentice, while facing a new threat to the County. Brother Wulf, published from 2020 to 2023, follows Brother Wulf, a young novice monk, and Tom Ward.

== List of works ==
=== The Wardstone Chronicles ===
1. The Spook's Apprentice (US: The Last Apprentice: Revenge of the Witch) (2004)
2. The Spook's Curse (US: The Last Apprentice: Curse of the Bane) (2005)
3. The Spook's Secret (US: The Last Apprentice: Night of the Soul Stealer) (2006)
4. The Spook's Battle (US: The Last Apprentice: Attack of the Fiend) (2007)
5. The Spook's Mistake (US: The Last Apprentice: Wrath of the Bloodeye) (2008)
6. The Spook's Sacrifice (US: The Last Apprentice: Clash of the Demons) (2009)
7. The Spook's Nightmare (US: The Last Apprentice: Rise of the Huntress) (2010)
8. The Spook's Destiny (US: The Last Apprentice: Rage of the Fallen) (2011)
9. Spook's: I Am Grimalkin (US: The Last Apprentice: Grimalkin the Witch Assassin) (2011)
10. The Spook's Blood (US: The Last Apprentice: Lure of the Dead) (2012)
11. Spook's: Slither's Tale (US: The Last Apprentice: Slither) (2012)
12. Spook's: Alice (US: The Last Apprentice: I Am Alice) (2013)
13. The Spook's Revenge (US: The Last Apprentice: Fury of the Seventh Son) (2013)

=== The Starblade Chronicles ===
1. Spook's: A New Darkness (2014)
2. Spook's: The Dark Army (2016)
3. Spook's: The Dark Assassin (2017)

=== Brother Wulf ===
1. Brother Wulf (2020)
2. Brother Wulf: Wulf's Bane (2021)
3. Brother Wulf: The Last Spook (2022)
4. Brother Wulf: Wulf's War (2023)

=== Related works ===
- The Spook's Tale / Interception Point (2009) – A World Book Day UK publication combining Delaney's short story "The Spook's Tale" with Mark Walden's "Interception Point".
- The Last Apprentice: The Spook's Tale and Other Horrors (2009) – A US collection containing "The Spook's Tale", "Alice's Tale", "Grimalkin's Tale" and "The Gallery of Villains".
- The Spook's Stories: Witches (2009) – A collection containing "Meg Skelton", "Dirty Dora", "Alice and the Brain Guzzler", "The Banshee Witch" and "Grimalkin's Tale". It was published in the US as The Last Apprentice: A Coven of Witches.
- The Spook's Bestiary (2010) – A guidebook to creatures in the Spook's fictional world. It was published in the US as The Last Apprentice: The Spook's Bestiary: The Guide to Creatures of the Dark.
- The Spook's Stories: Grimalkin's Tale (2011) – A short story published as an e-book.
- Alice and the Brain Guzzler (Storycuts) (2011) – A short story published as an e-book.
- The Ghost Prison (2013) – A novella set in the same fictional world with different characters and storylines.
- Spook's: The Seventh Apprentice (2014) – A novella about the Spook's seventh apprentice, Will Johnson. It was published in the US as The Last Apprentice: The Seventh Apprentice.
- Seventh Son (2015) – A film tie-in volume repackaging the first two Spook's books, The Spook's Apprentice and The Spook's Curse.

== Books in the series ==
=== The Wardstone Chronicles ===
==== The Spook's Apprentice ====
In the County, Thomas "Tom" Ward, the seventh son of a seventh son, is apprenticed to John Gregory, a spook who deals with supernatural beings such as boggarts, ghosts and witches. Tom befriends Alice Deane despite Gregory's warnings about witches. Alice's connection to Mother Malkin and Bony Lizzie draws Tom into danger after she mistakenly helps Malkin escape. With Gregory's instruction and the use of rowan wood and silver, Tom learns to deal with these threats. He finally lures Mother Malkin into a pig pen, where she is destroyed, while Alice remains an uncertain ally.

==== The Spook's Curse ====
In the cathedral catacombs beneath Priestown, Gregory and Tom confront the Bane, a creature Gregory has previously failed to defeat. The task is complicated by the arrival of the Quisitor, who hunts witches, spooks and people suspected of practising dark magic. Alice Deane makes a bargain with the Bane, offering it her blood and risking possession. After Gregory is arrested and sentenced to death, Tom and Alice free him and confront the Bane. Tom destroys it after Alice pleads for mercy, ending the curse on Priestown.

==== The Spook's Secret ====
During winter, Gregory leaves Chipenden for his winter house at Anglezarke, where the cellar contains bound witches and boggarts. Tom learns more about Gregory's past and the reason for their move. A stranger is revealed as Morgan Hurst, Gregory's former apprentice, who has become a necromancer and seeks to raise an old god. The book connects Gregory's earlier failures with the conflict that now threatens the County.

==== The Spook's Battle ====
Tom learns that his mother has returned to Greece and left three trunks for him. Gregory sends Tom and Alice Deane to collect them, but they discover that Tom's family has been abducted by witches and taken to Pendle. Tom becomes involved with rival witch clans, including the Mouldheels, and the plans of Mistress Wurmalde. The witches seek to summon the Fiend. Tom tries to rescue his family and prevent the summoning while learning more about his mother and his own heritage.

==== The Spook's Mistake ====
Tom is sent north for further training under Bill Arkwright, who lives at a haunted mill near dangerous marshes. Arkwright's training is severe and is meant to prepare Tom for attacks from the Dark, including Morwena, a water witch and daughter of the Fiend. When Arkwright misjudges the danger, Tom is left vulnerable. With help from Alice Deane and Gregory, he fights Morwena and other servants of the Fiend. The book also examines the consequences of Gregory's decision to send Tom away.

==== The Spook's Sacrifice ====
Tom is divided between loyalty to Gregory and obedience to his mother, Mam, who reveals that she is a lamia. Tom, Mam, Alice and Gregory travel to Greece to face the Ordeen, an entity whose return would bring destruction. During the journey they face the Fiend's attempts to influence Tom and allies who use dark magic. Mam gives her life to hold back the Ordeen. Through her letters and a final encounter with her spirit, Tom learns more about her motives and continues his apprenticeship.

==== The Spook's Nightmare ====
As war spreads through the County, Gregory, Tom and Alice Deane travel to the Isle of Mona, where suspected witches are tested and those found guilty are offered to the buggane. Lord Barrule, a shaman who works with the buggane, controls much of the island. Bony Lizzie also returns, seeking revenge for her imprisonment in Gregory's garden pit. Tom, Alice and Gregory must survive the island's rulers and enemies from the County.

==== The Spook's Destiny ====
Gregory, Tom and Alice Deane travel to south-west Ireland to confront a Celtic witch and goat mages who intend to raise Pan. Tom discovers the Destiny Blade, a weapon that tempts its bearer with violence. Grimalkin, a witch assassin formerly allied with the Dark, joins them. They face the witch, the goat mages and Pan's influence, while Tom struggles with the cost of using weapons connected to the Dark.

==== Spook's: I Am Grimalkin ====
The story follows Grimalkin, a witch assassin whose actions are shaped by the murder of her son. She agrees to work with Tom and Gregory to bind the Fiend, despite her connection to the Dark. After the Fiend is beheaded, Grimalkin guards and moves his severed head to prevent his followers from recovering it. The narrative follows her attempts to protect this victory from rival forces.

==== The Spook's Blood ====
Tom returns to Malkin Tower and learns what is required to destroy the Fiend. He and Gregory are then drawn to Todmorden under the pretext of adding to the Chipenden library. They find a town gripped by fear after dark and become involved in attacks by creatures of the Dark. Their work strains their partnership with Alice Deane and Grimalkin. During the conflict, Gregory is badly wounded and the vampire god Siscoi is released.

==== Spook's: Slither's Tale ====
The story centres on Slither, an inhuman creature who lives beyond the County's borders and feeds on sleeping humans. After a local farmer dies, Slither plans to claim the man's daughters, but the farmer makes a bargain: Slither must protect the two younger girls in exchange for taking the eldest, Nessa. Slither keeps the bargain and travels with Nessa through a hostile region. They encounter Grimalkin, who is still seeking a way to destroy the Fiend, and try to survive enemies connected to the wider struggle against the Dark.

==== Spook's: Alice ====
Alice Deane travels alone into the dark to obtain the last weapon needed to defeat the Fiend. Separated from Tom and Gregory, she passes through places and memories from her own past. The task may lead to her death, since Tom is expected to kill her once she returns with the weapon. Alice must resist both external threats and the risk of giving herself over to the Dark.

==== The Spook's Revenge ====
Tom faces new danger at the end of his apprenticeship. Alice Deane returns with the final hero blade and instructions for its use, increasing the pressure on Tom to end the Fiend's power. Tom learns that his mother was the first lamia and that the Wardstone has properties connected to old prophecies. The conflict brings Tom into opposition with Lukrasta and leads to Alice turning to the Dark under Lukrasta's influence. After several losses, including Gregory's death, Tom succeeds in ending the Fiend and becomes the County's spook.

=== The Starblade Chronicles ===
==== Spook's: A New Darkness ====
After John Gregory's death, Tom Ward becomes the Chipenden spook. He faces the threat of the Kobalos, who are moving towards the County. Jenny, a seventh daughter of a seventh daughter, becomes his apprentice. Tom confronts a Kobalos mage and seeks the Starblade, a weapon buried with Gregory. Grimalkin's hostility towards the Kobalos also affects the conflict.

==== Spook's: The Dark Army ====
After Tom Ward's apparent death, his allies face the threat of a dark army and the onset of an unnatural winter. With Tom gone, the remaining characters try to continue the fight against the Dark and prevent the threat from reaching the County.

==== Spook's: The Dark Assassin ====
The novel follows the County's struggle against enemies connected to the Kobalos and a mysterious assassin moving between earth and oblivion. With Tom's fate uncertain and the County threatened by war, the remaining characters look for a way to resist powers strengthened by a god.

=== Brother Wulf ===
==== Brother Wulf ====
The story follows Brother Beowulf, known as Wulf, a young monk and scribe who serves Spook Johnson. When Johnson is captured by a witch, Wulf travels with Tom Ward and Alice Deane to rescue him. The journey brings them into contact with witches, betrayals and beings such as Circe. Wulf learns more about the work of spooks and the dangers of the Dark.

==== Brother Wulf: Wulf's Bane ====
Wulf continues his apprenticeship under Spook Johnson and becomes more involved in conflicts involving magic and violence. He works with Tom Ward, Alice Deane and Tilda against opponents including Circe and the Malkin clan. With guidance from Hrothgar and Grimalkin, Wulf takes part in battles that test his abilities. After the defeat of Circe, he joins his companions on a journey to confront the Pendle witches.

==== Brother Wulf: The Last Spook ====
Tom Ward and Alice Deane confront renewed threats in Priestown, including signs of the Fiend's return. Wulf continues his training with Hrothgar, faces bound wraiths and is given the task of destroying the Fiend. The characters' stories come together in an attempt to end the Fiend's influence.

==== Brother Wulf: Wulf's War ====
Wulf encounters powerful beings including Golgoth, the Lord of Winter, and Loki. He sets out to find Grimalkin and Thorne so they can continue the fight against the Dark. His search takes him through Silverdale and Silvertown, where he faces traps, changing loyalties and prophecies about his death. With help from Jenny and other allies, Wulf confronts demons, witches and Golgoth. The ending suggests that time may have been altered and leaves Wulf considering the consequences of changing the past.

== Characters ==
- Thomas Jason "Tom" Ward: apprentice to John Gregory and the seventh son of a seventh son. He is also the son of the ancient lamia Zenobia. From his father he inherits the gifts of a spook, and from his mother he inherits powers connected to time, healing and his lamia form.
- John Gregory: the spook for the County, and Tom Ward's mentor.
- Alice Deane: a witch who becomes Tom's closest friend. She is the daughter of Bony Lizzie and the Fiend, and her story repeatedly places her between the Light and the Dark.
- Bony Lizzie: a witch, Alice's former teacher and mother. She is captured by Gregory, later freed, and attempts to take control of the Isle of Mona.
- Mother Malkin: a powerful witch killed by Tom Ward.
- Tusk: an abhuman and Mother Malkin's son, killed by Gregory.
- Agnes Sowerbutts: Alice's aunt and Lizzie's sister, a benign witch, healer and midwife who helps Alice and a young Grimalkin.
- Adriana: a bird witch on the Isle of Mona who helps Ward, Gregory and Alice Deane against Lizzie.
- Mam/Lamia/Zenobia: Tom's mother, the original lamia witch.
- Wynde and Slake: two lamia witches and Mam's spiritual sisters who ally themselves with Ward.
- Wurmalde: a Greek witch and old enemy of Mam.
- Bill Arkwright: the spook for the County north of Caster, and a former apprentice of Gregory.
- Judd Brinscall: a spook and former apprentice of John Gregory who worked in Romania before moving to Caster.
- Grimalkin: the Malkin witch assassin who allies with Tom and Gregory against the Fiend.
- Thorne Malkin: a witch and Grimalkin's apprentice as witch assassin.
- John Ward: Tom's father and a seventh son.
- Jack Ward: Tom's oldest brother, who inherits the family farm apart from one room left for Tom.
- James Ward: Tom's second-oldest brother, a blacksmith.
- Tibb: a creature of the Dark created by the Malkins to see into the future.
- Mab Mouldheel: a young witch and leader of the Mouldheel clan.
- Morgan Hurst: a necromancer and former apprentice of Gregory who tries to summon Golgoth.
- Meg Skelton: a lamia witch who lives in John Gregory's winter house in Anglezarke and was formerly Gregory's lover.
- The Fiend: an old god and the Devil, and a major antagonist.
- Lukrasta: an ancient dark mage and creator of the Doomdryte grimoire.
- Horn: an abhuman who can see darkness in others.
- Kratch: the boggart who serves Gregory in Chipenden.
- Slither: a Kobalos mage who becomes involved in the conflict against his own kind.
- Talkus the Unborn: a Kobalos god who takes the Fiend's place after Ward kills him.
- Golgoth: an old god and god of winter.
- Siscoi: an old god and vampire god who serves the Fiend.
- Pan: an old god and nature god.
- Hecate: an old god and self-proclaimed Queen of the Witches.
- The Bane: a former old god who has declined into a demon.
- The Ordeen: an old god opposed by Mam.

== Publication ==
The Wardstone Chronicles was published from 2004 to 2013. In the United Kingdom, the hardback editions were published by The Bodley Head, an imprint of Penguin, and the paperbacks by Red Fox, an imprint of Random House. In the United States, the books were published by Greenwillow Books, an imprint of HarperCollins. The Starblade Chronicles was published from 2014 to 2017 by the same publishers. Brother Wulf was published from 2020 to 2023 by Puffin, another Penguin imprint.

== Illustrations ==
The UK editions were illustrated by David Wyatt, who provided the original series covers and chapter illustrations. The US editions were illustrated by Patrick Arrasmith, who designed the cover art and pen-and-ink chapter illustrations. The Last Apprentice: A Coven of Witches was illustrated by Tim Foley, and The Spook's Bestiary was illustrated by Julek Heller.

== Audiobooks ==
Unabridged audiobook versions of the series have been released in the United Kingdom and the United States. The UK audiobooks were produced by Random House Audio. Jamie Glover read Book 1, and Will Thorp read Book 2. Thomas Judd read books 3 through 8, and books 10 and 13. Gabrielle Glaister read Book 9, Toby Longworth and Kate Harbour jointly read Book 11, and Annie Hemingway read Book 12. Random House Audio also produced an abridged version of The Spook's Apprentice, read by Daniel Weyman.

The US audiobooks were produced by Harper Audio. Christopher Evan Welch read books 1 through 10, and was joined by Angela Goethals for Book 11. Welch also read the short story collection The Spook's Tale and Other Horrors. Welch died of lung cancer in 2013. Goethals read Book 12, and Alexander Cendese read Book 13.

== Adaptations ==
In 2014, Stephen Delaney and Joseph Delaney published a 160-page play-script adaptation of The Spook's Apprentice under the title The Spook's Apprentice - Play Edition.

A film adaptation of The Spook's Apprentice, titled Seventh Son, was released by Legendary Pictures and directed by Sergey Bodrov. Ben Barnes starred as Tom Ward. The cast also included Jeff Bridges as John Gregory, Julianne Moore as Mother Malkin, Alicia Vikander as Alice Deane, Kit Harington as Billy Bradley, Djimon Hounsou as Radu, and Antje Traue as Bony Lizzie.

In 2023, a French graphic novel adaptation of The Spook's Apprentice was published under the title L'Épouvanteur, Tome 1: L'Apprenti épouvanteur. Pierre Oertel wrote the text, and Benjamin Bachelier provided the illustrations.

== Reception ==
The Spook's series has been published in 30 countries, with sales exceeding 4.5 million copies.

The series has received positive reviews. Two books in the series were included on the ALSC's 2006 list of "Notable Videos/DVDs, Recordings, Software, and Subscription Services" and the YALSA's 2009 list of "Fabulous Films & Amazing Audiobooks for Young Adults". The Spook's Apprentice won the Sefton Book Award and the Hampshire Book Award, and was shortlisted for the Lancashire Book of the Year award.
