= Folklore of Lancashire =

Folklore in a county of England

Lancashire, like all other counties of England, has historically had its own peculiar superstitions, manners, and customs, which may or may not find parallels in those of other localities.

== Supernatural folklore ==
Boggarts are associated with the county (though they can be found elsewhere in the North West). Boggart was a generic name for a solitary supernatural being. It included ghosts, shape-changers, house-faeries and will o' the wisps. Boggarts in Lancashire included Clapcans, a noise-making bogie reported in the Greater Manchester area. A figure associated with water was Jenny Greenteeth, responsible for drowning children. Another Lancashire dialect word for supernatural beings was 'Feorin'' (frightening things): this was sometimes applied to fairies.

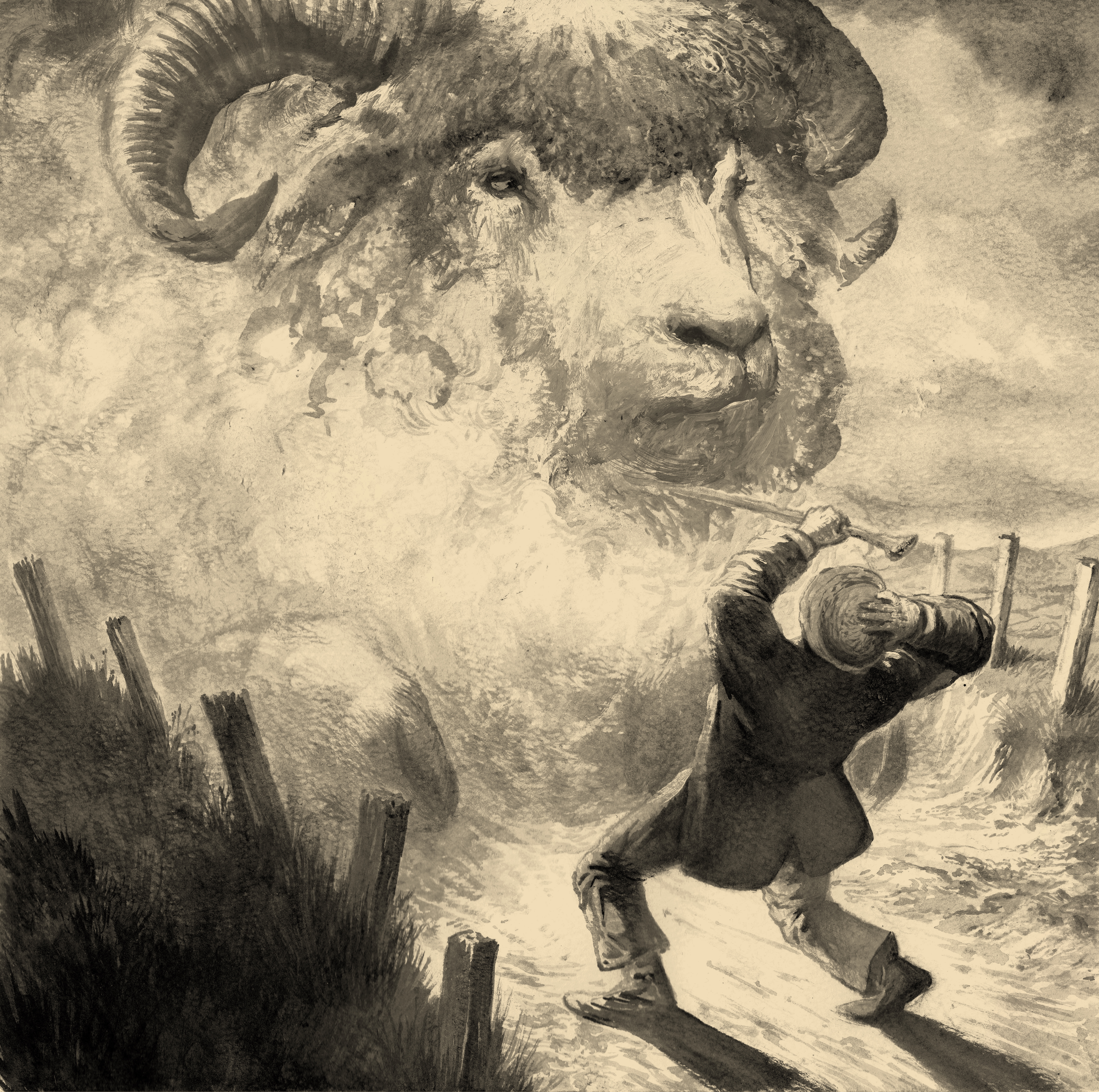
Sheep Boggart encountered near Carnforth - "The supposed sheep aroused itself and as if with indignity at the insult, swelled out as the man affirms, into the size of a house". Art by Jantiff Illustration

There was, in fact, extensive fairylore in the county with many Lancashire fairy placenames including, for instance, the Fairy Caves between Blackburn and Accrington.

There is a great deal of devil-lore in the north-west. In many parts of Lancashire there are devil placenames, such as, for instance, the Devil's Footprints and the Devil's Apronful near Pendle.

== Calendar customs ==
There are a number of Lancashire calendar customs usually tied to localities. Examples include rushbearing at Middleton and Riding the Black Lad at Ashton-under-Lyne.

== Witchcraft and cunning folk ==
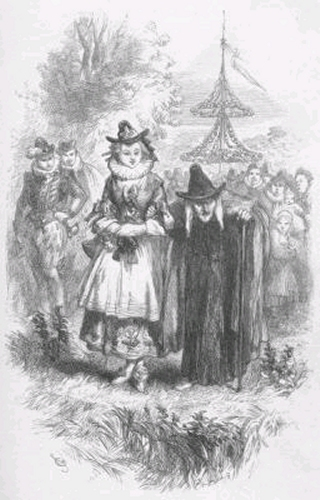
An illustration of Ann Redferne and Chattox, two of the Pendle witches, from Ainsworth's novel The Lancashire Witches

The Pendle witch trials of 1612 associated Lancashire with witchcraft in the popular imagination: this was particularly so in the nineteenth century after William Ainsworth's celebrated historical novel The Lancashire Witches (1848). The 1612 trials were, by no means, the last in the county. For instance, in 1634, there were further witch trials at Pendle itself.

Cunning men and women operated in Lancashire right through the 1800s. Take, for instance, Owd [Old] Rollison at Worsley with his small library of occult books.

== Writers on Lancashire folklore ==
Lancashire folklore writing began in the 1820s and continues through to today. It is one of the folklore writing traditions in Britain.

=== Roby and Co., 1829–c.1850 ===
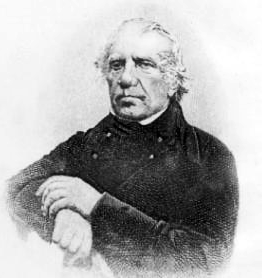
Samuel Bamford, one of Lancashire's first folklore writers.

The First Age of Lancashire folklore writing spans 1829 to around 1850. It was defined by the romanticization of folklore, in the works of John Roby, whose Traditions of Lancashire set a precedent for future folklore writings in Lancashire (and also Britain more generally). Roby's approach, though criticized for its fictionalization of sources, was instrumental in popularizing folklore. His contemporaries, including 'the Chronicler' (an anonymous Wigan writer), William Thornber (for Blackpool) and Samuel Bamford, contributed local traditions. Bamford, a working-class author, provided a raw, authentic insight into local beliefs and superstitions, distinguishing his works from Roby’s romanticized narratives.

=== The Manchester School, c.1850–1880 ===
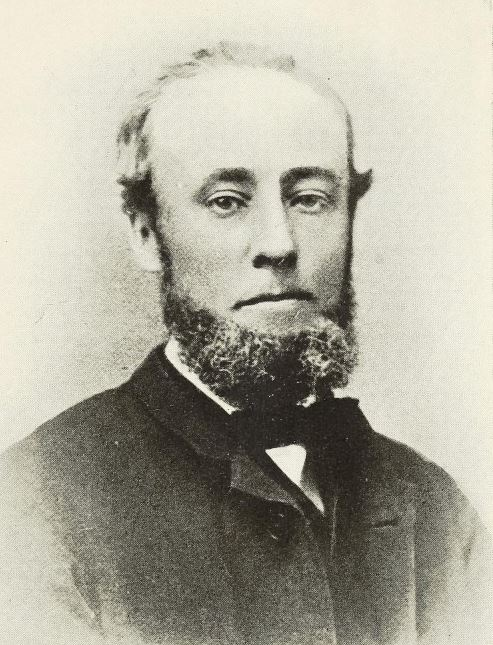
John Higson, one of the mid-nineteenth-century Lancashire folklorists.

This era saw a surge in serious and scholarly folklore collection and writing: in fact, Lancashire arguably led the county in this period in folklore collection. Pivotal figures like John Harland, John Higson, William Axon, Thomas Turner Wilkinson, James Bowker and Charles Hardwick emerged, bringing a more academic and rigorous approach to folklore writing. Central were Harland and Wilkinson's works including two jointly-authored monographs Lancashire Folk-Lore and Lancashire Legends, Traditions, Pageants, Sports &c. The writers of this period moved beyond mere collection to analyze and compare folklore themes. These figures were overwhelmingly concentrated in south-eastern Lancashire and many knew and socialised with each other. Their lives centred on Manchester. Another feature of the folklore writing of this period was that it often took place in Lancashire dialect literature: Edwin Waugh, and many others treated folklore themes, above all, boggarts.

=== Dribs and Drabs, c.1880–1920s ===
While folklore writing was taking off in Britain, often under the influence of the Folklore Society, it receded in Lancashire. In this period there were various unconnected individuals across the county producing works of varying quality. Notable contributors included W.E.A. Axon, who explored folklore in a controlled manner, comparing Lancashire traditions with those of other regions and countries. Charles Roeder, a German scholar, wrote on Moston. Tatersall Wilkinson published on the folklore of Burnley. Ammon Wrigley became the most important author on Saddleworth dialect and traditions. Henry Cowper included a remarkable chapter on the folklore of Hawkshead in his book on the same parish (then part of Lancashire). James McKay gave a series of talks on boggarts at Burnley. Then the vicar G. R. Oakley wrote Roby-style stories about Rochdale.

=== Later writers ===
W. Langley Roberts published in 1931 a children's book on county traditions. Frederick Grice brought out a pamphlet in 1953 for adults. In 2018 Melanie Warren published Lancashire Folk, an overview of folklore in the county. Ceri Houlbrook has written, in an academic key, on boggarts and particularly Boggart Hole Clough.

== See also ==
- English folklore

== Bibliography ==
- Axon, William E.A., Black Knight of Ashton (Manchester: John Heywood, n.d.).
- Bamford, Samuel Passages in the life of a radical, and Early days (T. Fisher Unwin, 1905), 2 vols.
- Barrowclough, David A. and John Hallam 'The Devil's Footprints and Other Folklore: Local Legend and Archaeological Evidence in Lancashire', Folklore 119 (2008), 93-102.
- Clayton, John A. The Boy Witchfinder of Pendle Forest (Barrowford Press, 2012)
- Cowper, Henry Hawkshead (The Northernmost Parish of Lancashire) (London: Bemrose 1899)
- Davies, Owen Popular Magic: Cunning-folk in English History (London: 2003)
- Grice, Frederick Folk Tales of Lancashire (Thomas Nelson and Sons, 1953).
- Harland, John and Thomas Turner Wilkinson,Lancashire Folk-lore (1867)
- Harland, John and Thomas Turner Wilkinson, Lancashire Legends, Traditions, Pageants, Sports &c (Routledge and Sons, 1873)
- Houlbrook, Ceri ‘The Suburban Boggart: Folklore of an inner-city park’, Gramarye 11 (2017), 19-32.
- Oakley, G. R. In Olden Days: Legends of Rochdale and its Neighbourhood (Edwards & Bryning, 1923)
- Poole, Robert ‘Middleton Rushbearing’, Manchester Region History Review 8 (1994), 14-22
- Roberts, W. Langley Lancashire: County Legend & Folklore (Collins Clear Type Press 1931).
- Roby, John Traditions of Lancashire (Longman: 1829-1831) [4 volumes; two in the first series in 1829; and two in the second series in 1831].
- Roeder, Charles ‘Some Moston Folklore’, Transactions of the Lancashire and Cheshire Antiquarian Society 25 (1907), 65-78.
- Thornber, William The History of Blackpool and its Neighbourhood (Galava, 1985 [reprint of the 1837 original]).
- Warren, Melanie, Lancashire Folk (Schiffer Publishing 2018).
- Winterbottom, Vera, The Devil in Lancashire (Stockport: Cloister Press, 1962).
- Young, S. R. Boggarts, Fairies and Cunning Men: Some Forgotten Lancashire Folklore Essays (Pwca Books 2023).
- Young, Simon ‘Clapcans: A Greater Manchester Bogie’, Northern Earth 166 (2021), 11-13
- Young, Simon ‘Lancashire Folklore Writing, 1829-1923: John Roby to G. R. Oakley’, Transactions of the Lancashire and Cheshire Antiquarian Society 114 (2023), 148-167.
