= The Outsider (short story) =

- Short story by H. P. Lovecraft
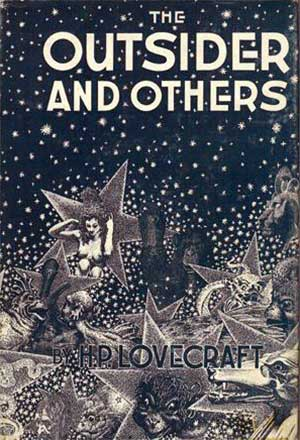
- Cover of collection The Outsider and Others

Text available at Wikisource
- Country: United States
- Language: English
- Genre: Horror

Publication
- Published in: Weird Tales
- Publication type: Periodical
- Media type: Print (Magazine)
- Publication date: April 1926

"The Outsider" is a short story by American horror writer H. P. Lovecraft. Written between March and August 1921, it was first published in Weird Tales, April 1926. In this work, a mysterious individual who has been living alone in a castle for as long as he can remember decides to break free in search of human contact and light. "The Outsider" is one of Lovecraft's most commonly reprinted works and is also one of the most popular stories ever to be published in Weird Tales.

"The Outsider" combines horror, fantasy, and gothic fiction to create a nightmarish story, containing themes of loneliness, the abhuman, and the afterlife. Its epigraph is from John Keats' 1819 poem "The Eve of St. Agnes".

== Inspiration ==
In a letter, Lovecraft himself said that, of all his tales, this story most closely resembles the style of his idol Edgar Allan Poe, writing that it "represents my literal though unconscious imitation of Poe at its very height." The opening paragraphs echo those of Poe's "Berenice", while the horror at the party recalls the unmasking scene in "The Masque of the Red Death".

The story may also have been inspired in part by Nathaniel Hawthorne's "Fragments from the Journal of a Solitary Man", in which a man dreams that he is walking down Broadway in a burial shroud, only understanding the shocked reaction of passersby when he sees his reflection in a shop window.

Another suggested literary model is Mary Shelley's novel Frankenstein (1818), in which the creature causes a shock when he enters a cottage: "I had hardly placed my foot within the door before the children shrieked, and one of the women fainted." The monster later looks in a pool of water and sees his reflection for the first time.

Colin Wilson, in The Strength to Dream (1961), points to Oscar Wilde's short story "The Birthday of the Infanta", in which a misshapen dwarf is horrified to see his reflection for the first time.

Some critics have suggested that "The Outsider" is autobiographical, and that Lovecraft was talking about his own life when he wrote, "I know always that I am an outsider; a stranger in this century and among those who are still men." An H. P. Lovecraft Encyclopedia finds this analysis to be exaggerated, but suggests that the story "may possibly be indicative of HPL's own self-image, particularly the image of one who always thought himself ugly and whose mother told at least one individual about her son's 'hideous' face."

== Synopsis ==
An unnamed narrator lives in a decaying, ancient castle filled with darkness, dampness, and eerie silence, surrounded by grotesque trees and devoid of human presence. Haunted by loneliness and a longing for light and life, the narrator, who has no memory of human interaction or his own identity, spends his days reading moldy books and dreaming of a brighter world beyond the oppressive forest. Driven by a desperate need for light, he decides to climb a ruined black tower, the only structure reaching above the trees, hoping to glimpse the sky. After a grueling ascent, the narrator reaches what he believes is the tower's summit, only to discover he is at ground level, emerging into a moonlit churchyard with a ruined spire. Confused but determined, he wanders through the countryside until he finds a brightly lit castle filled with revelry. Entering, he causes the partygoers to flee in terror. Approaching a golden arch, he sees a horrifying, decayed creature, which he soon realizes is his own reflection in a mirror. The shocking revelation of his monstrous, undead nature floods him with memories of his true existence, shattering his sense of self. Fleeing in a dreamlike state, the narrator embraces his alienation, finding solace among ghouls and ancient, forbidden places. He accepts that he is an outsider, forever separated from humanity, with only the moonlight and the company of the dead to comfort him.

== Analysis ==
Horror historian Les Daniels described "The Outsider" as "arguably the author's finest work". Joanna Russ praised "The Outsider" as one of Lovecraft's best stories, describing it as "poetically melancholy". Though some may contend that Lovecraft's "The Outsider" is purely a horror story, there are predominantly Gothic themes that play significant roles in this short story including loneliness, the abhuman, and the afterlife that take it to a more psychological level.

=== Loneliness ===
The narrator in "The Outsider" exists in a perpetual state of loneliness. At the onset of the story, it is revealed that he has lived for years in the castle but cannot recall any person ever being there except for himself. Neither can he recall the presence of anything alive but the "noiseless rats and bats and spiders" that surround him. He has never heard the voice of another human being, nor has he ever spoken aloud. His only encounters with the outside world are those he attains from reading the old books that have been left within the castle.

Upon encountering humanity later in the story, the narrator is left even more lonely than before. He has come to witness human life and has been immediately shunned from it due to his appearance. Being outcast from the society he longed to know forced the narrator to continue living life as a recluse. However, this time it has been made worse because what he has lost was no longer a vague idea from a book but a tangible thing held out of his grasp. He is the monster.

=== The ab-human ===
In Gothic fiction, ab-human refers to a "Gothic body" or something that is only vestigially human and possibly in the process of becoming something monstrous, such as a vampire, werewolf, or in this case a walking corpse. Kelly Hurley writes that the "abhuman subject is a not-quite-human subject, characterized by its morphic variability, continually in danger of becoming not-itself, becoming other."

The idea of "becoming other" parallels what is happening in this story. The intensity of the process is heightened because the reader is learning of this transition from human to the ab-human right along with the narrator who is learning it himself.

== Connections to other Lovecraft stories ==
Ghouls make frequent appearances in Lovecraft's work, such as in The Dream-Quest of Unknown Kadath (1926), although they are generally very different from the undead creatures described here. This story also mentions Nitocris and Nephren-Ka briefly. Nitocris, a legendary queen of Egypt, also makes an appearance in the 1924 Lovecraft and Harry Houdini collaboration "Imprisoned with the Pharaohs". Nephren-Ka is mentioned in "The Haunter of the Dark" as the Pharaoh who built "a temple with a windowless crypt" to the Shining Trapezohedron, and "did that which caused his name to be stricken from all monuments and records".

== Adaptations ==
- In 1964, Erik Bauersfeld narrated an audio adaptation on the old-time radio program The Black Mass. This adaptation was later used as part of a limited edition LP release along with his audio adaptation of the Lovecraft story "The Rats in the Walls".
- Roddy McDowall was the narrator of the story on a 1966 LP release (Lively Arts 30003) that also included the Lovecraft story "The Hound".
- The 1995 Stuart Gordon film Castle Freak is based upon this story and "The Rats in the Walls". A reboot/remake of the 1995 film was released in 2020.
- Gou Tanabe adapted the story into a manga in 2007.
- In 2019, a modern-day adaptation of the short story, directed by Ludvig Gür, premiered at the H.P. Lovecraft Film Festival. It played at multiple festivals and was picked up by horror-brand ALTER (a division of Gunpowder & Sky) for online distribution and was featured in the H.P. Lovecraft Film Festival Best of 2019 DVD Collection.
- Season 4 of the Netflix series Chilling Adventures of Sabrina features various Lovecraft entities as antagonists. In episode 2, "The Uninvited", the Outsider is portrayed as a hideously filthy vagrant who asks for shelter, but murders anyone who does not invite him in.
- In 2024, filmmaker and monster artist Monstark wrote and directed The Outsider, a dialogue-free short-film adaptation using handmade puppets and sets. It had its world premiere at the H. P. Lovecraft Film Festival screenings at NecronomiCon Providence and later screened at the festival in Portland.
- In 2026, the short film The Outsider: An H.P. Lovecraft Tale, directed by german filmmaker Manuel Gößl and starring Ines Herz, adapted the story to a contemporary setting. The film was selected as a worldwide streaming exclusive for the 2026 H. P. Lovecraft Film Festival Streaming Edition.
