= Joseph Delaney =

English author (1945–2022)

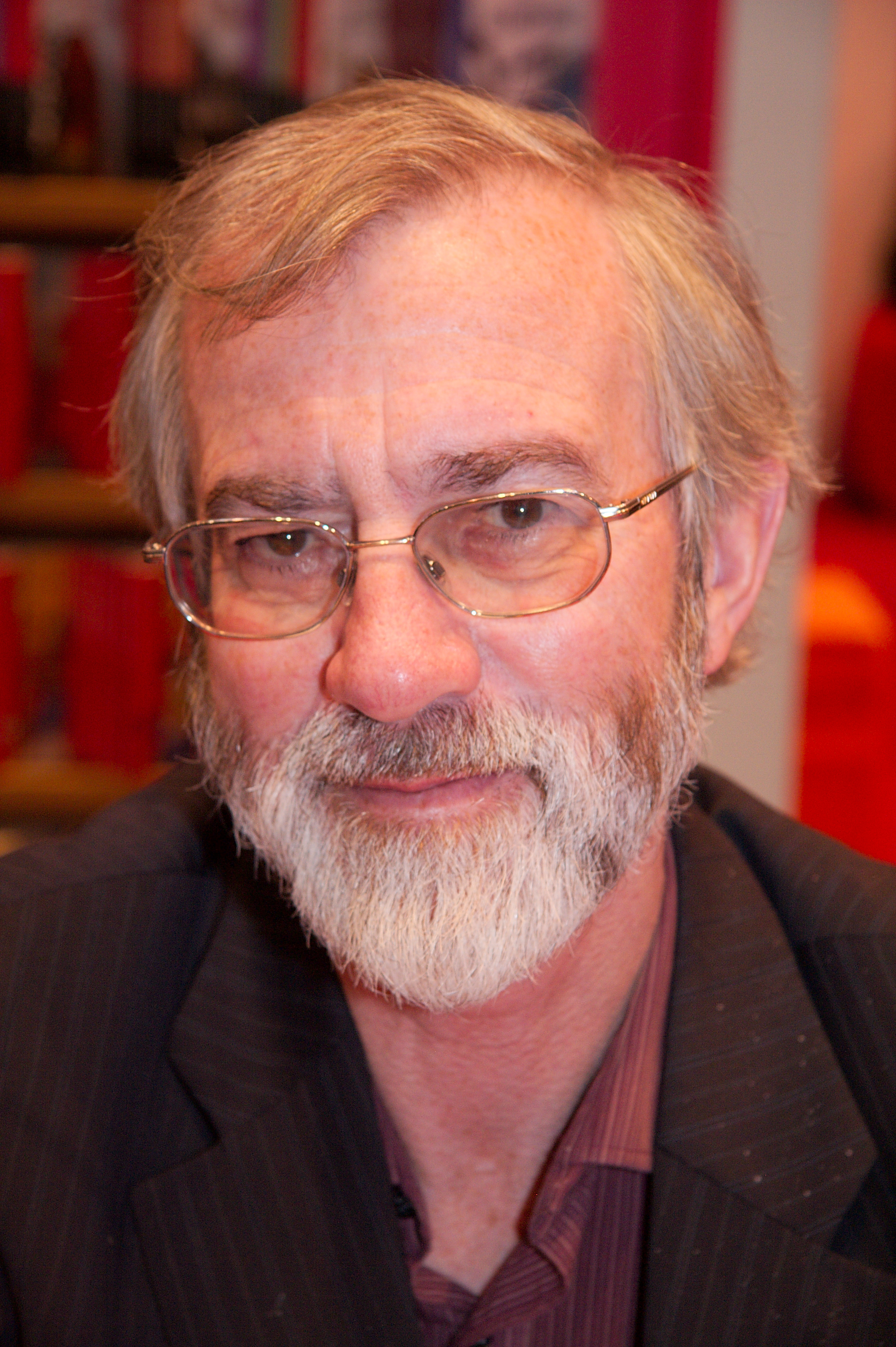
- Delaney in 2008
- Born: Joseph Henry Delaney; 25 July 1945; Preston, Lancashire, England
- Died: 16 August 2022 (aged 77); Manchester, England
- Education: Lancaster University; St Martin's College; Open University
- Occupations: Novelist; short story writer
- Spouses: Marie Smith (m. 1968; died 2007) Rani Kuncher Vannithamby (m. 2014)
- Children: 3
- Writing career
- Pen name: J. K. Haderack (until 2004)
- Years active: 1996–2022
- Genres: Children's literature; fantasy; dark fantasy; science fiction
- Notable work: The Spook's Apprentice (2004)
- Notable awards: Sefton Book Award (2006); Hampshire Book Award (2006); Prix Plaisirs de Lire (2006)
- Website: josephdelaneyauthor.com

Joseph Henry Delaney (25 July 1945 – 16 August 2022) was an English author, best known for the children's dark fantasy series Spook's. The series draws on the folklore, history, and geography of Lancashire, and has been published in 30 countries, with reported sales of more than 4.5 million copies.

Born in Preston, Lancashire, Delaney worked as a teacher before publishing science fiction and fantasy fiction under the pen name J. K. Haderack. After finding limited success as an author of books for adults, he began writing for children under his own name. His first children's book, The Spook's Apprentice, was published in 2004. It won several awards and was later adapted as a play script, the feature film Seventh Son, and a French graphic novel.

The Spook's Apprentice began the Spook's sequence, which grew to 20 books, with additional works set in the same fictional world. After the publication of the second book in the series, Delaney retired from teaching to write full-time. He also wrote two other children's series, the science fiction and fantasy trilogy Arena 13 and the dark fantasy duology Aberrations. Delaney died in Manchester in 2022, aged 77. His final book, Brother Wulf: Wulf's War, was published posthumously in 2023.

== Biography ==
=== Early life ===
Joseph Henry Delaney was born on 25 July 1945 in Preston, Lancashire, the son of a labourer. He was the oldest of four children. As a child, Delaney had a recurring nightmare in which he sat with his mother while she knitted, before a shadowy figure emerged from the coal cellar, picked him up, and carried him into darkness.

=== Education and teaching ===
Delaney attended Preston Catholic College and then worked as an apprentice engineer. He took his A-Levels at night school before studying English, history, and sociology as a mature student at Lancaster University, aged 27.

After graduating, he studied at St Martin's College to become a teacher. He later became an English teacher at Blackpool Sixth Form College, where he started the Media and Film Studies Department.

In the 1980s, Delaney completed an Open University degree while considering a move into computer programming. In 1983, he moved to the village of Stalmine, where he learned that a priest was said to have once encountered a boggart in the area.

=== Writing career ===
==== Early works ====
Delaney's first published works appeared under the pen name J. K. Haderack, a reference to the Kwisatz Haderach from Frank Herbert's Dune universe. After struggling to find a publisher for his science fiction and fantasy novels, his agent suggested he write for a younger audience in response to a brief from a children's publisher.

==== The Spook's series ====
To meet the brief, Delaney wrote a novel based on a story he had first written in 1993. It drew on the Stalmine boggart story, as well as the folklore, history, and geography of Lancashire. He also used childhood memories and experiences in the book. In 2004, it was published as The Spook's Apprentice under his own name, becoming the first book of the dark fantasy Spook's series. The book sold more than 3 million copies and won the Sefton Book Award, Hampshire Book Award, and Prix Plaisirs de Lire, and was shortlisted for the Lancashire Book of the Year.

The Spook's series follows Tom Ward, who is apprenticed to John Gregory, the local spook, and helps defend the County against supernatural threats. The series has been published in 30 countries, with sales exceeding 4.5 million copies. Following the publication of the second book, Delaney retired from teaching to write full-time.

==== Other series ====
Delaney wrote two further series for children. From 2015 to 2017, he published the science fiction and fantasy trilogy Arena 13. The trilogy follows Leif, a sixteen-year-old who enters the fighting pit Arena 13 and seeks to defeat Hob, the being who controls the city zone of Midgard and is responsible for the death of Leif's family. From 2018 to 2019, he published the dark fantasy duology Aberrations, which follows Crafty, a boy trapped in the mist of the Shole who trains as a gate grub in the Castle and works for the Gatemancers' guild.

==== Influences and writing process ====
Delaney identified J. R. R. Tolkien and Frank Herbert as his two main literary influences. Like Bram Stoker, author of Dracula, Delaney used dreams in his stories, and said that he did not plot or plan them in advance.

Delaney travelled to promote his books, often spending part of the winter in New Zealand or Singapore because he disliked cold weather. He continued to spend much of his time in Lancashire, which remained a setting and source for his fiction.

=== Death ===
Delaney, who was living in Manchester, died on 16 August 2022, aged 77, after a period of illness. He was working on his final book, Brother Wulf: Wulf's War, shortly before his death. It was published posthumously in 2023.

== Personal life ==
Delaney married Marie Smith in 1968. They had three children and nine grandchildren. She died of cancer in 2007. In 2014, he married Rani Kuncher Vannithamby.

Delaney shared his name, including his middle name, with Joseph H. Delaney (1932–1999), an American science fiction author of several books and short stories.

== Works ==
=== Spook's ===
==== The Wardstone Chronicles ====
1. The Spook's Apprentice (US: The Last Apprentice: Revenge of the Witch) (2004)
2. The Spook's Curse (US: The Last Apprentice: Curse of the Bane) (2005)
3. The Spook's Secret (US: The Last Apprentice: Night of the Soul Stealer) (2006)
4. The Spook's Battle (US: The Last Apprentice: Attack of the Fiend) (2007)
5. The Spook's Mistake (US: The Last Apprentice: Wrath of the Bloodeye) (2008)
6. The Spook's Sacrifice (US: The Last Apprentice: Clash of the Demons) (2009)
7. The Spook's Nightmare (US: The Last Apprentice: Rise of the Huntress) (2010)
8. The Spook's Destiny (US: The Last Apprentice: Rage of the Fallen) (2011)
9. Spook's: I Am Grimalkin (US: The Last Apprentice: Grimalkin the Witch Assassin) (2011)
10. The Spook's Blood (US: The Last Apprentice: Lure of the Dead) (2012)
11. Spook's: Slither's Tale (US: The Last Apprentice: Slither) (2012)
12. Spook's: Alice (US: The Last Apprentice: I Am Alice) (2013)
13. The Spook's Revenge (US: The Last Apprentice: Fury of the Seventh Son) (2013)

==== The Starblade Chronicles ====
1. Spook's: A New Darkness (2014)
2. Spook's: The Dark Army (2016)
3. Spook's: The Dark Assassin (2017)

==== Brother Wulf ====
1. Brother Wulf (2020)
2. Brother Wulf: Wulf's Bane (2021)
3. Brother Wulf: The Last Spook (2022)
4. Brother Wulf: Wulf's War (2023)

==== Related works ====
- The Spook's Tale / Interception Point (2009) – A short story, "The Spook's Tale", combined with Mark Walden's "Interception Point" for World Book Day UK.
- The Last Apprentice: The Spook's Tale And Other Horrors (2009) – A collection of four short stories: "The Spook's Tale", "Alice's Tale", "Grimalkin's Tale", and "The Gallery of Villains".
- The Spook's Stories: Witches (2009) – A collection of five short stories: "Meg Skelton", "Dirty Dora", "Alice and the Brain Guzzler", "The Banshee Witch", and "Grimalkin's Tale". Published in the US as The Last Apprentice: A Coven of Witches.
- The Spook's Bestiary (2010) – A guidebook to creatures in the Spook's universe. Published in the US as The Last Apprentice: The Spook's Bestiary: The Guide to Creatures of the Dark.
- The Spook's Stories: Grimalkin's Tale (2011) – Short story published as an e-book.
- Alice and the Brain Guzzler (Storycuts) (2011) – Short story published as an e-book.
- The Ghost Prison (2013) – A novella set in the same universe, with different characters and storylines.
- Spook's: The Seventh Apprentice (2014) – A novella featuring the Spook's seventh apprentice, Will Johnson. Published in the US as The Last Apprentice: The Seventh Apprentice.
- Seventh Son (2015) – The first two Spook's books, The Spook's Apprentice and The Spook's Curse, repackaged as a film tie-in edition.

=== Arena 13 ===
1. Arena 13 (2015)
2. Arena 13: The Prey (2016)
3. Arena 13: The Warrior (2017)

=== Aberrations ===
1. The Beast Awakens (2018)
2. The Witch's Warning (2019)

=== Other works ===
- Mysterious Erotic Tales (writing as J. K. Haderack; contributing author of "Elvara Should Be Easy") (1996)
- Mercer's Whore (writing as J. K. Haderack) (1997)
- Half-Minute Horrors (contributing author of "All Fingers and Thumbs") (2009)
- Haunted (contributing author of "The Castle Ghosts") (2011)

== Adaptations ==
Delaney's son Stephen collaborated with him on a 160-page play script adaptation of The Spook's Apprentice. It was published in 2014 as The Spook's Apprentice – Play Edition.

In 2014, a film adaptation was released by Legendary Pictures, directed by Sergey Bodrov and titled Seventh Son. Ben Barnes played Tom Ward, Jeff Bridges played the Spook, Julianne Moore played Mother Malkin, Alicia Vikander played Alice Deane, Kit Harington played Billy Bradley, Djimon Hounsou played Radu, and Antje Traue played Bony Lizzie.

In 2023, a French graphic novel adaptation of the book, titled L'Épouvanteur, Tome 1: L'Apprenti épouvanteur, was released. It was written by Pierre Oertel and illustrated by Benjamin Bachelier.
