= The Three Jovial Huntsmen =

Picture book by Randolph Caldecott

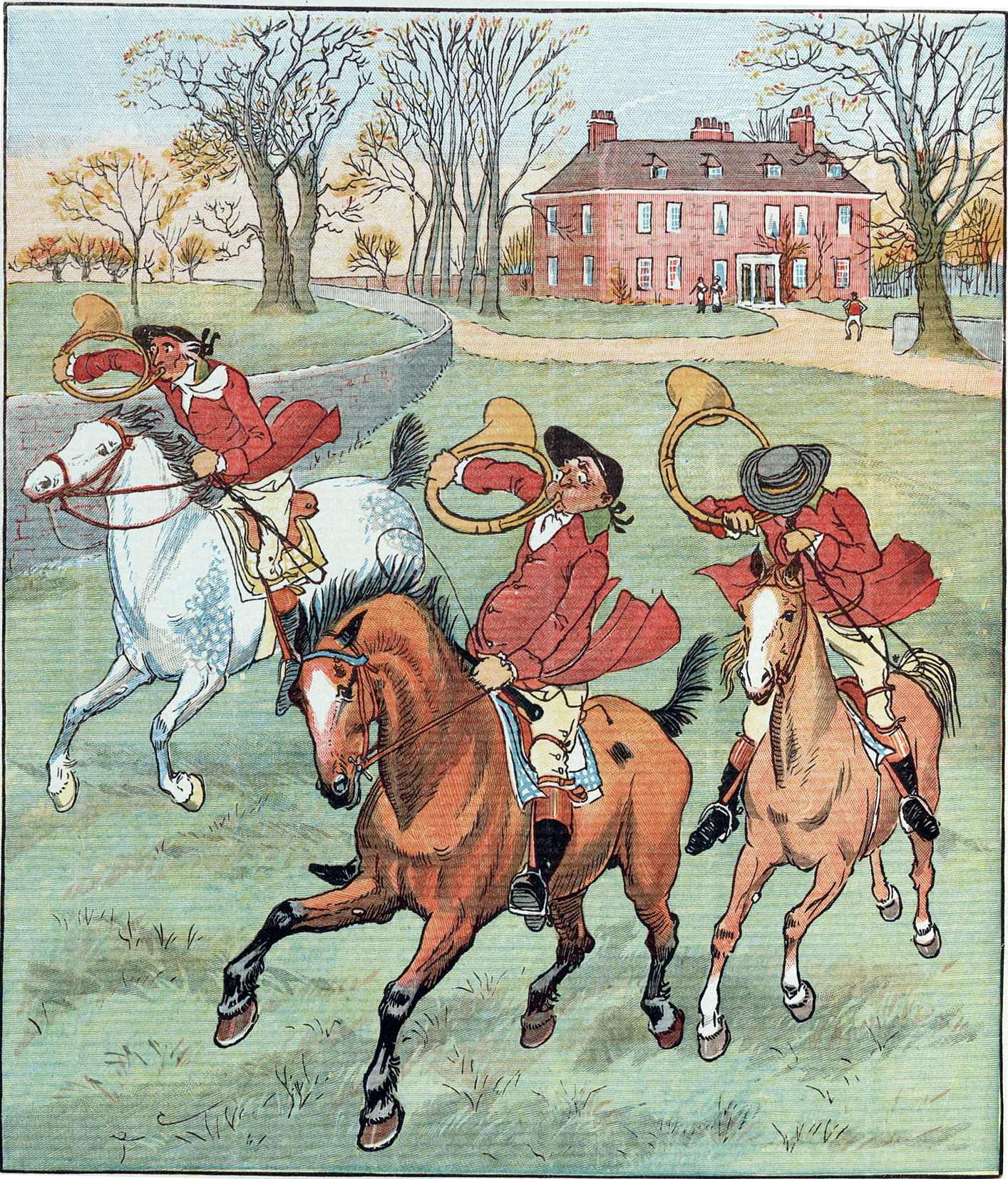
The three jovial huntsmen

The Three Jovial Huntsmen (1880) was a popular British picture book illustrated by Randolph Caldecott, engraved and printed by Edmund Evans and published by George Routledge & Sons in London. The Project Gutenberg eBook, The Three Jovial Huntsmen, by Randolph Caldecott, Illustrated by Randolph Caldecott is available online as Project Gutenberg eBook No. 14081. The toy book, which is a variant of the folklore song The Three Huntsmen (sometimes called the Three Jolly Huntsmen), was well-received, selling tens of thousands of copies.

The three droll equestrians featured in the book are used as the logo of The Horn Book Magazine. In 1914, four colour pictures from the book were reproduced by Frederick Warne & Co. as postcards.

The story was also noted for using the word "powlert" which was not defined in either the Oxford English Dictionary or Century Dictionary.

== Postcards ==
The Three Jovial Huntsmen postcards
| Card no. | Card lines | Picture |
|---|---|---|
| A3 | One said it was a boggart, an' another he say "Nay; It's just a ge'man-farmer, that has gone an' lost his way" | |
| A4 | One said it was a bull-calf, an' another he said "Nay; It's just a painted jackass, that has never learnt to bray." | |
| B3 | ? | ? |
| B4 | So they hunted, an' they hollo'd, till the setting of the sun; An' they'd nought to bring away at last, when th' huntin'-day was done. | |
