= The Boggart =

Children's novel by Susan Cooper

- First edition Cover art by Trina Schart Hyman
- Author: Susan Cooper
- Publisher: Margaret K. McElderry Books
- Publication date: 1 January 1993
- ISBN: 978-0-689-50576-8

The Boggart is a children's novel by Susan Cooper published in 1993 by Macmillan.The book was nominated for a Young Reader's Choice Award (Grade 4–8) in 1996.

It tells the tale of a family from Canada, the Volniks, who inherit a castle in Scotland. They soon discover that, together with the castle, they also seem to have inherited a mischievous spirit: a boggart.

== Plot summary ==
A timeless spirit of mischief, the boggart has lived in Castle Keep since ages past, wreaking havoc upon the MacDevons who've lived there. His job, as far as he's concerned, is to keep life "interesting" for his beloved family. He's been too busy filching apples, knotting shoelaces, and trashing the kitchen to pay much attention to the march of history. But when the last MacDevon dies, the boggart has to come to terms with a new set of owners: the Volnik family from Toronto, who have no intention of inhabiting the drafty tumbledown castle that they've inherited from their great-uncle MacDevon. The sulking boggart is most displeased to find himself mistakenly shipped to Canada inside an antique desk destined for Emily Volnik's room. But once out and about, he is fascinated by this new world of peanut butter, pizza, and electric gizmos. Filching oatcakes quickly becomes a thing of the past as the boggart finds all sorts of new ways he can drive this modern family crazy. Possessing the TV set? No problem. Booby-trapping the house for Halloween? Well, if kids can do it, boggarts can do it. The traffic lights in downtown Toronto? Wouldn't they look prettier if they were another color? But when the boggart's pranks send Emily to the hospital, she and her brother Jessup must find a way to pry the boggart out of his new home and send him back to the castle where he belongs.

Back in Scotland, the mail carrier swears his van is haunted when he delivers Tommy's Christmas package all the way from Canada and the video game that Tommy finds inside seems to have a mind of its own. When Tommy crashes into the black hole himself, the boggart bursts forth from his own computer, home at last and free. The happy boggart returns to Castle Keep, ready to welcome its new owners with a whole host of boggart tricks.

== Characters ==
Emily Volnik is the twelve-year-old girl who first discovers the boggart. She is cheerful, adventurous, and resourceful; of all the family, she is most interested in their Scottish heritage and lobbies hardest to keep the castle, or at least as many of the furnishings as the family can. As far as the adults are concerned, the boggart's pranks are Emily's fault, since she is channelling her "adolescent anger" into paranormal manifestations: not a boggart, but a poltergeist. Although Emily is fond of the boggart, she needs to get him back to Scotland before she is institutionalised by the villain, Dr. Stigmore.

Jessup Volnik is Emily's ten-year-old brother who prides himself on having the IQ of a genius. Jessup is a pretty fantastic computer programmer who spends most of his time with the "Gang of Five", a posse of older kids who also programmers. Jessup and his gang are developing a video game called Black Hole, which becomes very important to the story. Jessup also plays ice hockey, a sport that the boggart becomes involuntarily involved in.

Tommy Cameron is a person who has known the boggart for years as a frequent nuisance at his family's general store in Port Appin, Scotland. Tommy grudgingly befriends Emily and Jessup when they come breezing into his hometown to look over Castle Keep, but he does not tell them about the boggart in their family's castle. Tommy sends Emily and Jessup a few postcards after they leave Scotland, and he becomes an invaluable resource when they need someone to explain what a boggart is and how to deal with it. Thirteen-year-old Tommy is also a computer whiz, and it is with his help that the boggart is finally shipped back home to his beloved Scottish castle.

Maggie Volnik is Emily and Jessup's mother. She is, unfortunately, a very highly strung woman, and the sight of the boggart flinging furniture out the window or levitating expensive wine glasses in her antique shop sends her into near-hysterics. Maggie is apt to blame the children for the chaos that is taking over their house, and she is easily convinced by the evil Dr. Stigmore that Emily needs to be institutionalised.

Robert Volnik is Emily and Jessup's father. He is a theatre producer at the Chervil Playhouse, and takes a more laid-back view of the world than Mrs. Volnik. Although Mr. Volnik also suspects the children are to blame for most of the pranks, he is very sympathetic when the boggart's experiment with traffic lights lands Emily in the hospital. He refuses to allow anyone to take Emily away, and he has no patience with the tabloid reporters who want to spotlight the spooky goings-on at his theatre.

Dr. William Stigmore is the story's only villain, a parapsychologist who gets on Emily and Jessup's nerves the moment he enters their mother's store. Dr. Stigmore earns himself the nickname of "The Creep" when he is rude to the children, condescending to their mother, and walks off with the antique that Emily really wanted for herself. He is shopping in the store when the boggart starts playing with the merchandise—he blames the flying glasses and dancing dolls on a poltergeist. Dr. Stigmore sneaks into Emily's hospital room while she is in the hospital and tries to get her to tell him about the "paranormal" events going on around her. When Emily refuses to co-operate, Dr. Stigmore tries to have her transferred to his personal care ward. Fortunately, Maggie discovers that Dr. Stigmore is exploiting Emily's so-called "poltergeist" to make himself famous on a tabloid show, and promises that she will never let him near her family again.

Mr. Maconochie is the MacDevon family lawyer who helps the Volniks inherit and later sell Castle Keep. Mr. Maconochie is so upset at the idea of the little castle being abandoned that he decides to sell his law practice and buy the castle himself. At the end of the story, he is safely ensconced in his new home—which he has updated with central heating and electric lights—with his new tweeds in the closet, his new puppy curled in the hall, and his little grandnephews asleep in their beds. The boggart cannot believe his good fortune to have in his castle not only a kindly old man, but small children to play with and a dog to tease, and sews their shirtsleeves closed to welcome them properly!

Cymbeline, the play that Emily and Jessup see being rehearsed at their father's theatre, is one of William Shakespeare's last plays. It details the adventures of Princess Imogen (played in this version by the actress Meg), whose father King Cymbeline refuses to let her marry the noble but poorly born knight Leonates Posthumus. King Cymbeline instead insists that she marry her stepbrother, the evil Prince Cloten. Imogen runs away into the Welsh mountains, where she meets Morgan (played in this production by the friendly actor William) and his two "sons", who, Imogen eventually discovers, are really her long-lost brothers. When Prince Cloten comes seeking her, Imogen's eldest brother Guiderius crosses swords with him and slays him. The two brothers and their guardian eventually save Britain from an invasion of Romans, and King Cymbeline, mourning the death of his evil Queen and his wicked stepson, rediscovers his long lost princes and their sister. Like all of Shakespeare's later plays, it has many characters who appear to be lost forever but somehow get found: Imogen's lost husband, who reappears as a prisoner with the Roman army, the two lost princes, who have been learning manly arts in the Welsh mountains, and Imogen herself, who appears to be poisoned in the middle of the play, but the poison is unsuccessful and she recovers. The scene that moves the boggart to tears is the scene where Imogen's brothers find her, supposedly dead, and mourn her loss.

The Cailleach Bheur is a mystical blue hag enthralled to frequent parts of the Scottish Highlands. Associated with winter, she is reborn on All Hallows' Eve and returns to bring the winter and the winter snows. She carries a magical staff which freezes the ground with every tap. She is also guardian to animals throughout the winter, and returns to the earth by turning to stone on Beltane Eve.

== Sequel ==
The Boggart was followed by two sequels: The Boggart and the Monster (1997) and The Boggart Fights Back (2018).

== Inspiration ==
The inspiration for Castle Keep came from Castle Stalker, a location that appears in the final scene of the film Monty Python and the Holy Grail.

== Reception ==
The Boggart was reviewed in Booklist, Kirkus Reviews, and Publishers Weekly. Booklist also reviewed the audiobook.

Awards for The Boggart
Year	Award	Result	Ref.
1994	Judy Lopez Memorial Award for Children's Literature	Winner	
1995	Vermont Golden Dome Book Award	Winner	
1996	Mythopoeic Fantasy Award for Children's Literature	Shortlist	
1996	California Young Reader Medal for Middle School/Junior High	Nominee	
