= The Rats in the Walls =

1923 short story by H. P. Lovecraft

- Short story by H. P. Lovecraft
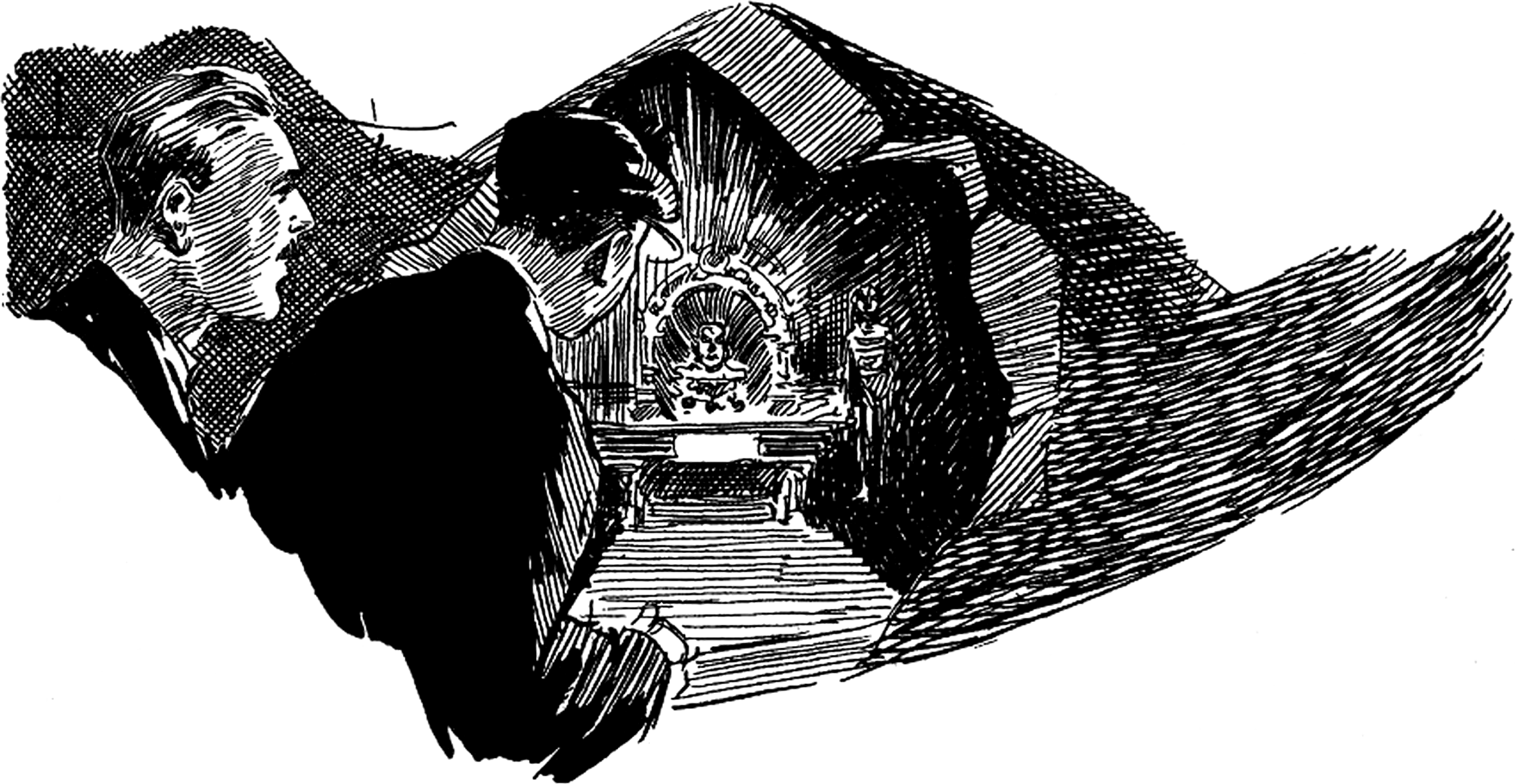

Text available at Wikisource
- Country: United States
- Language: English
- Genres: Horror, adventure

Publication
- Published in: Weird Tales
- Media type: Print (magazine)
- Publication date: March, 1924

"The Rats in the Walls" is a short story by American author H. P. Lovecraft. Written in August–September 1923, it was first published in Weird Tales, March 1924.

== Plot ==
In 1923, an American named Delapore, the last descendant of the De la Poer family, moves to his ancestral estate of Exham Priory in England following the death of his only son after World War I. To the dismay of nearby residents, he restores the estate. After moving in, Delapore and his cats frequently hear the sounds of rats scurrying behind the walls. Upon investigating further with the assistance of his son's war comrade Edward Norrys and several academics, and through recurring dreams, Delapore learns that his family maintained an underground city for centuries, where they raised generations of "human cattle"—some regressed to a quadrupedal state—to supply their taste for human flesh. This was stopped when Delapore's ancestor Walter killed his entire family in their sleep and left the country in order to end the horror, leaving the remaining human livestock and a surviving relative to be devoured by the rats inhabiting the city's cesspits.

Maddened by the revelations of his family's past, a hereditary cruelty, and his anger over his son's death, Delapore attacks Norrys in the dark of the cavernous city and begins eating him while rambling in a mixture of Middle English, Latin, and Scottish Gaelic, before devolving into a cacophony of animalistic grunts. He is subsequently subdued and placed in a mental institution. At least one other investigator, Thornton, has gone insane as well. Soon after, Exham Priory is destroyed and the investigators decide to cover up the existence of the underground city. Delapore maintains his innocence, proclaiming that it was "the rats, the rats in the walls", who ate the man. He continues to be plagued by the sound of rats in the walls of his cell.

== Characters ==
Delapore
The narrator. His first name is not mentioned. He changes the spelling of his name back to the ancestral "De la Poer" after moving to England. The title of Baron De la Poer actually exists in the Peerage of Ireland, and the spelling is indeed derived from le Poer, Anglo-Norman for "the Poor"; it is of some interest in peerage law.

Alfred Delapore
The narrator's son, born c. 1894. He goes to England as an aviation officer during World War I, where he hears stories about his ancestors for the first time. He is badly wounded in 1918, surviving for two more years as a "maimed invalid".

Edward Norrys
A captain in the Royal Flying Corps during World War I, Edward Norrys befriends Alfred, and amuses him by telling him the "peasant superstitions" surrounding his family's history, which Norrys picked up in his native Anchester. He is described as "a plump, amiable young man". He and Delapore are the ones who initially find the altar that leads to the grotto beneath the priory, and is ultimately killed and partially eaten by the now-insane Delapore, who is revealed to have hated him due to him having lived while Alfred died. It is also implied that Norrys is the model for the "animals" that Delapore sees being herded by the swineherd in his dreams.

The swineherd
A nameless being (heavily implied to represent Delapore himself) that Delapore sees in his dreams, tending to his unseen herd in a twilit grotto. It is his dreams of the swineherd that drive Delapore to investigate the city beneath the priory, as it matches the grotto that he sees in his dreams.

Sir William Brinton
One of the "eminent authorities" that accompanies Delapore's expedition beneath Exham Priory, Sir William Brinton is an archaeologist "whose excavations in the Troad excited most of the world in their day." It is Brinton who figures out how to move the counter-weighted altar that leads to the caverns, and who noted that the hewn walls must have been chiseled "from beneath". He is the only member of the expedition who retains his composure, when they discover the horrors below the priory.

Dr. Trask
Another eminent authority, Trask is an anthropologist who is "baffled" by the "degraded mixture" he finds in the skulls below Exham Priory—"mostly lower than the Piltdown Man in the scale of evolution, but in every case definitely human". The Piltdown Man, skeletal remains of a supposedly prehistoric humanoid, was discovered in 1912; it was not known to be a hoax until 1953, thirty years after the publication of "The Rats in the Walls". Trask determines that "some of the skeleton things must have descended as quadrupeds through the last twenty or more generations".

Thornton
The expedition's "psychic investigator", Thornton faints twice when confronted with the nightmarish relics below Exham Priory, and ends up committed to the Hanwell insane asylum with Delapore, though they are prevented from speaking to one another. Hanwell was an actual asylum, which Lovecraft probably read of in Lord Dunsany's "The Coronation of Mr. Thomas Shap" in The Book of Wonder (1912).

Gilbert De la Poer
The first Baron of Exham, granted title to Exham Priory by Henry III in 1261. There is "no evil report" connected to the family name before this point, but within 50 years, a chronicle is referring to an unnamed De la Poer as "cursed of God".

Lady Margaret Trevor
Lady Margaret Trevor of Cornwall married Godfrey De la Poer, second son of the fifth Baron of Exham, probably in the 14th or 15th centuries. Her description in the story vaguely resembles that of the historical figure Countess Bathory. Such was her enthusiasm for the Exham cult, that she "became a favorite bane of children all over the countryside, and the daemon heroine of a particularly horrible old ballad not yet extinct near the Welsh border".

Lady Mary De la Poer
After marrying the Earl of Shrewsfield (a title invented by Lovecraft), she was killed by her new husband and mother-in-law. When they explained their reasons to the priest they confessed to, he "absolved and blessed" them for their deed.

Walter De la Poer
The eleventh Baron of Exham, he killed all the other members of his family with the help of four servants, about two weeks after making a "shocking discovery", and then fled to Virginia, probably in the 17th century. He is the ancestor of the American Delapores and is the only De la Poer not hated by the people of Anchester, who revere him as a hero. He was remembered as "a shy, gentle youth", and later as "harassed and apprehensive"; Francis Harley of Bellview, "another gentleman-adventurer", regarded him as "a man of unexampled justice, honor, and delicacy."

Randolph Delapore
Randolph Delapore of Carfax, the Delapores' estate on the James River in Virginia, "went among the Negros and became a voodoo priest, after he returned from the Mexican War". He is a cousin of the narrator, who regards him as "the one known scandal of my immediate forebears", and who sees this race-mixing life as "unpleasantly reminiscent" of the "monstrous habits" of the ancestral De la Poers. Carfax Abbey is the name of Count Dracula's British outpost in the novel Dracula—a setting that has been suggested as an inspiration for Exham Priory.

The Cat
A cat owned by the narrator, originally named "Nigger-Man", but changed to "Black Tom" when the story was reprinted in Zest magazine in the 1950s. He could detect the spectral rats.

== Themes ==
Ancestry/genetics

Some of the more prevalent themes in "The Rats in the Walls". Most of the tension in the story stems from the unknowability of one's genetic history and the idea that a seemingly normal family can have such terrifying secrets.

Repression

Vermin, like rats, are sometimes used in literature to signify the return of something that has been repressed. The inclusion of unclean animals into a space that was once familiar is meant to transform the setting from comfortable to something more secretive.

Ancestral home

A known element in Gothic literature. Exham Priory is sometimes thought to be a metaphor for the human psyche. The visible layers are poised while the hidden layers are ready to regress to a sub-human state.

Dreams as divination

Delapore's recurring dreams are precursors to the terrors he will face later in the story. He feels his dreams may be significant, but is not willing to dwell on them much.

== Inspiration ==
Long after writing "The Rats in the Walls", Lovecraft wrote that the story was "suggested by a very commonplace incident—the cracking of wall-paper late at night, and the chain of imaginings resulting from it." Another entry in Lovecraft's commonplace book also seems to provide a plot germ for the story: "Horrible secret in crypt of ancient castle—discovered by dweller."

Steven J. Mariconda points to Sabine Baring-Gould's Curious Myths of the Middle Ages (1862–68) as a source for Lovecraft's story. The description of the cavern under the priory has many similarities to Baring-Gould's account of St. Patrick's Purgatory, a legendary Irish holy site, and the story of the priory's rats sweeping across the landscape may have been inspired by the book's retelling of the legend of Bishop Hatto, who was devoured by rats after he set fire to starving peasants during a famine (a story referenced in the legend of the Mouse Tower of Bingen).

Leigh Blackmore has posited that one surface feature of the story may be found in Edgar Allan Poe's "The Fall of the House of Usher", in which Roderick Usher comments that so abnormally sensitive is his hearing that he "can hear the rats in the walls".

The Gaelic quoted at the end of the story is borrowed from Fiona Macleod's "The Sin-Eater". Macleod included a footnote that translated the passage as: "God against thee and in thy face… and may a death of woe be yours… Evil and sorrow to thee and thine!" Lovecraft wrote to Frank Belknap Long, "[T]he only objection to the phrase is that it's Gaelic instead of Cymric as the south-of-England locale demands. But as with anthropology—details don't count. Nobody will ever stop to note the difference." Robert E. Howard, however, wrote a letter in 1930 to Weird Tales suggesting that the language choice reflected "Lluyd's theory as to the settling of Britain by the Celts"—a note that, passed on to Lovecraft, initiated their voluminous correspondence. The Cymric-speaking area at that time covered not only Wales, but all of the island below Hadrian's Wall, with Gaelic only being spoken north of the Wall.

S. T. Joshi points to Irvin S. Cobb's "The Unbroken Chain" as a model for Lovecraft's "The Rats in the Walls". In his essay, Lovecraft writes, "Later work of Mr. Cobb introduces an element of possible science, as in the tale of hereditary memory where a modern man with a negroid strain utters words in African jungle speech when run down by a train under visual and aural circumstances recalling the maiming of his black ancestor by a rhinoceros a century before."

== Connections ==
"The Rats in the Walls" is loosely connected to Lovecraft's Cthulhu Mythos stories; toward the end, the narrator notes that the rats seem "determined to lead me on even unto those grinning caverns of earth's centre where Nyarlathotep, the mad faceless god, howls blindly to the piping of two amorphous idiot flute-players." In this reference to Nyarlathotep, the first after his introduction in the prose poem of the same name, the entity seems to have many of the attributes of the god Azathoth.

Before moving to Exham Priory, Delapore lives in Bolton, Massachusetts, a factory town where the title character of "Herbert West–Reanimator" performs some of his experiments. The town is also mentioned in "The Colour Out of Space"; it is not thought to be the same place as the real-world Bolton, Massachusetts.

Later Mythos writers have suggested the Magna Mater ("Great Mother") worshipped by the Exham cult was Shub-Niggurath (though in the story itself multiple references are made to Roman goddess Cybele, known as Magna Mater).

Lady Margaret Trevor of Cornwall (mentioned in "Characters" above), the Elizabeth Bathory-like noblewoman who wed a scion of the De La Poer family in the fourteenth or fifteenth century, was apparently a direct ancestor of the narrator in another Lovecraft story, "Celephaïs". The narrator of "Celephaïs," who is the last of a noble family that lived in an ancestral manor for thirteen generations at the coast on the other side of the Surrey downs from London, perishes in the story by drowning at the foot of a sea cliff below his ancestral home, which is named Trevor Towers. Thus, the narrator's name was Trevor, and his family would have been nobility at the time of Lady Margaret's marriage. (After the narrator of "Celephaïs" dies in the story, his dream-self lived on in the Dream-World, where he ruled a city and had the name Kuranes, and appears as a character in yet another Lovecraft work, "The Dream-Quest of Unknown Kadath", where it is confirmed that his ancestral home was on the coast of Cornwall.)

== Literary significance and criticism ==
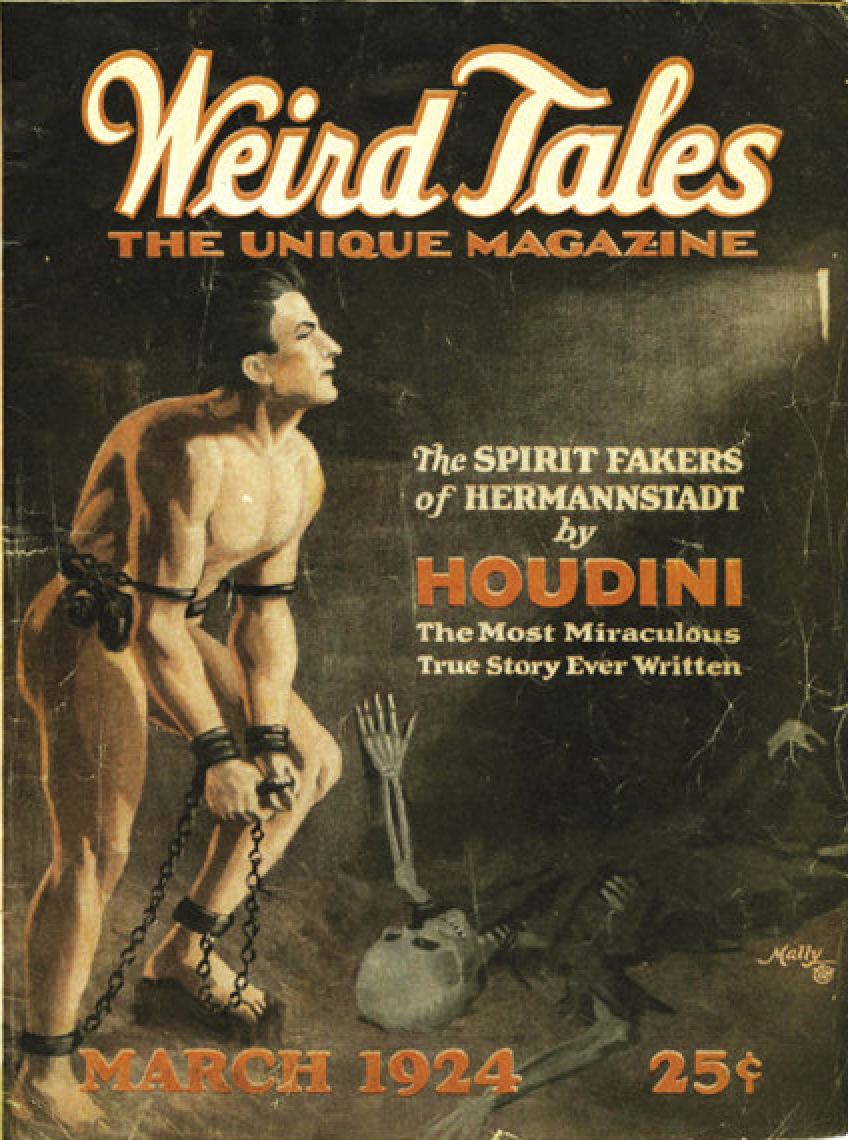
Issue of Weird Tales that The Rats in the Walls first appeared in, March 1924.

The story was rejected by Argosy All-Story Weekly before being accepted by Weird Tales; Lovecraft claimed that the former magazine found it "too horrible for the tender sensibilities of a delicately nurtured publick". The publisher of Weird Tales, JC Henneberger, described the story in a note to Lovecraft as the best his magazine had ever received. It was one of the few Lovecraft stories anthologized during his lifetime, in the 1931 collection Switch on the Light, edited by Christine Campbell Thompson.

It is notable in that Lovecraft uses the technique of referring to a text (in this case real life works by Petronius and Catullus) without giving a full explanation of its contents, so as to give the impression of depth and hidden layers to his work. He later refined this idea with the Necronomicon, prevalent in his Cthulhu Mythos stories.

Equally important to the later development of the Cthulhu Mythos is that a reprint of this story in the June 1930 edition of Weird Tales inspired Robert E. Howard to write to the magazine praising the work. This letter was passed on to Lovecraft and the two became friends and correspondents over the next six years until Howard's death in 1936. This literary connection became reflected in each author adding aspects from the other's works to their own tales and Howard is considered one of the more prolific of the original Cthulhu Mythos authors.

Kingsley Amis listed "Rats" (along with "The Dunwich Horror") as one of the Lovecraft stories "that achieve a memorable nastiness". Lin Carter called "Rats" "one of the finest stories of Lovecraft's entire career." S. T. Joshi describes the piece as "a nearly flawless example of the short story in its condensation, its narrative pacing, its thunderous climax, and its mingling of horror and poignancy."

The name of the cat, "Nigger-Man," has often been cited in discussions of Lovecraft's racial attitudes, even though the story itself contains no negative racial depictions. Lovecraft owned a cat by that name until 1904. The cat had likely been given its name when Lovecraft was about age nine.

== Adaptations ==
- Richard Corben and Donald Wandrei have adapted the story for the comic book format.
- The Atlanta Radio Theater Company has produced a radio adaptation.
- In 1964, Erik Bauersfeld narrated an audio adaptation on the old-time radio program The Black Mass. This adaptation was later used as part of a limited edition LP release along with his audio adaptation of the Lovecraft story "The Outsider".
- In 1973, Caedmon Audio released a cassette and LP featuring David McCallum reading the story.
- The 1993 anthology film Necronomicon features a segment loosely based on "The Rats in the Walls".
- The 1995 Stuart Gordon film Castle Freak is based upon this story and "The Outsider".
- In 2017, the H. P. Lovecraft Historical Society produced an audio dramatization under their Dark Adventure Radio Theater series.
- In 2016–2017, French company Compagnie Ka produced a play adapting the story and "The Outsider" using puppets.

== See also ==
- Devolution
- Dysgenics

== Sources ==
- Lovecraft, Howard P. (1984) [1923]. "The Rats in the Walls". In Joshi, S. T. (ed.). The Dunwich Horror and Others (9th corrected printing ed.). Sauk City, Wisconsin: Arkham House. ISBN 978-0-87054-037-0. Definitive version.
- H. P. Lovecraft, More Annotated Lovecraft, S. T. Joshi and Peter Cannon, eds.
- H. P. Lovecraft, The Annotated Lovecraft, S. T. Joshi, ed.
- Lin Carter, Lovecraft: A Look Behind the Cthulhu Mythos.
