= Boggart Hole Brook =

River in Greater Manchester, England

Coordinates: 53°31′12″N 2°12′41″W

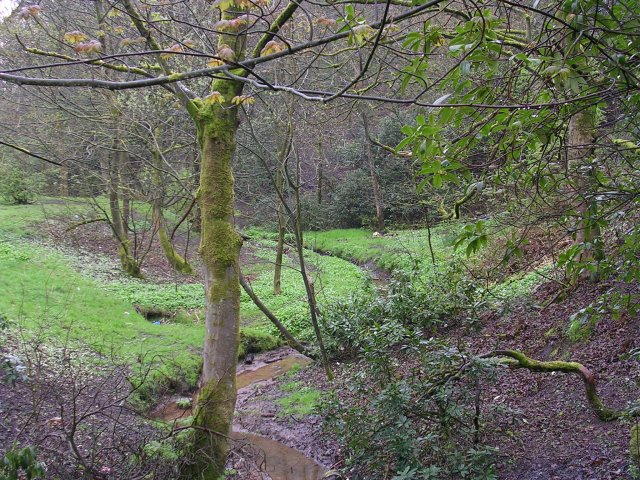
- Boggart Hole Clough Brook

Location
- Country: England

Physical characteristics
- Source
  - location: Boggart Hole Clough
- Mouth
  - location: River Irk

Boggart Hole Brook is a river in Blackley, Manchester, England, which is a tributary of the River Irk. It rises in Boggart Hole Clough, near the main lake, and has a length of just over a mile (1.6 km).
