= Castle Stalker =

Tower house in Argyll, Scotland

Coordinates: 56°34′16″N 5°23′10″W

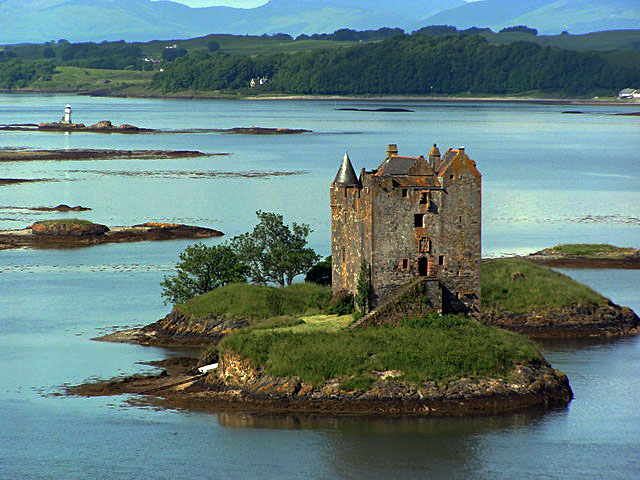
- Castle Stalker with the Lynn of Lorne and Lismore beyond
- Interactive map of the Castle Stalker area

General information
- Location: Argyll and Bute, Tidal island on Loch Laich, Scotland

Website
- castlestalker.com

Castle Stalker (Scottish Gaelic: Caisteal an Stalcaire) is a four-storey tower house or keep in the Scottish county of Argyll. It is set on a tidal islet on Loch Laich, an inlet off Loch Linnhe. It is about 1 1/2 miles (2.5 kilometres) north-east of Port Appin and is visible from the A828 road about midway between Oban and Glen Coe. The islet is accessible with difficulty from the shore at low tide. The name "Stalker" comes from the Gaelic Stalcaire, meaning "hunter" or "falconer". The island castle is one of the best preserved medieval tower houses to survive in western Scotland and is a Category A listed building. It stands in the Lynn of Lorn National Scenic Area.

== History ==
The original castle was a small fort built around 1320 by Clan MacDougall, who were then Lords of Lorn. Around 1388, the Stewarts took over the Lordship of Lorn, and it is believed that they built the castle in its present form around the 1440s. The Stewarts' relative King James VI of Scotland visited the castle, and a drunken bet, around 1620, resulted in the castle passing to Clan Campbell. After the castle changed hands between these clans a couple of times, the Campbells finally abandoned it about 1840 when it lost its roof. In 1908, the castle was bought by Charles Stewart of Achara, who carried out basic conservation work. In 1965, Lt. Col. D. R. Stewart Allward acquired the castle and over about ten years fully restored it. Castle Stalker remains in private ownership and is open to the public at selected times during the summer.

For the 2011 census, the island on which the castle stands was classified by the National Records of Scotland as an inhabited island that "had no usual residents at the time of either the 2001 or 2011 censuses."

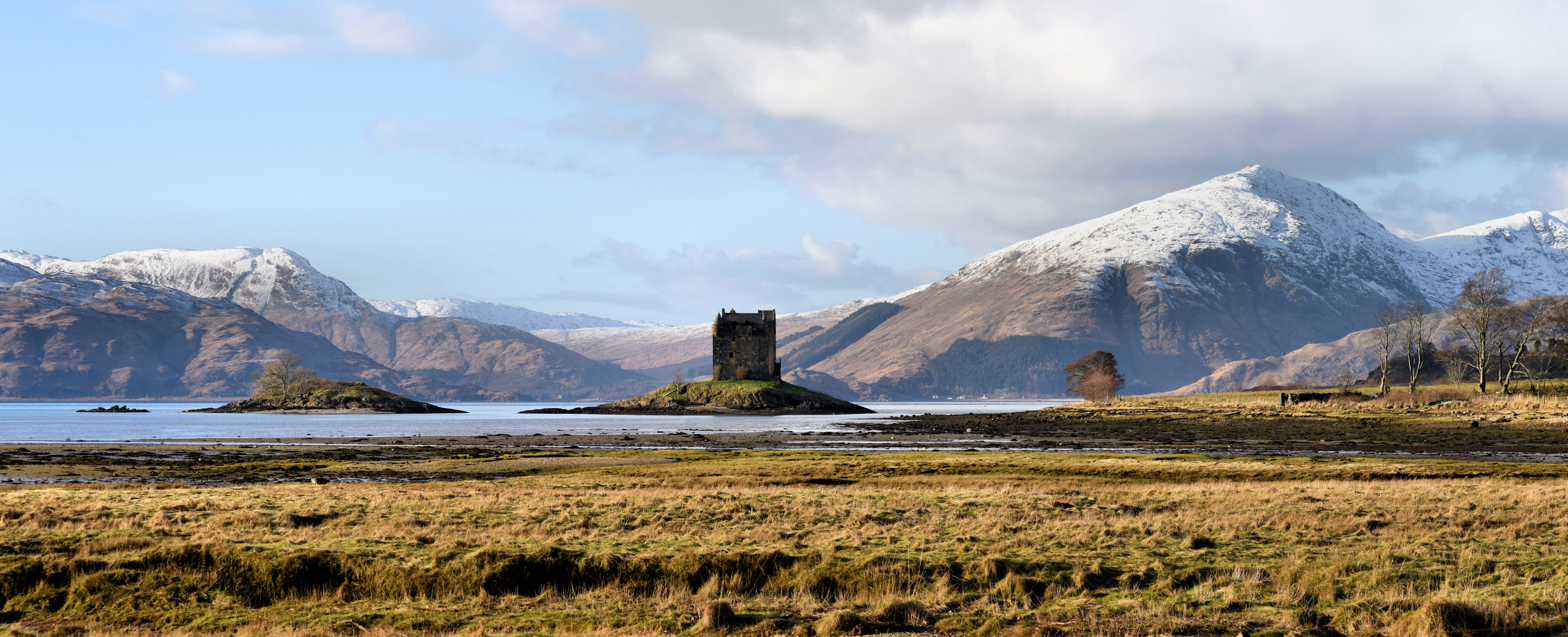
View of Loch Laich and Castle Stalker with the mountains of Morvern in the background

== In popular culture ==
Castle Stalker has been used as a location for the filming of multiple works including:

- Monty Python and the Holy Grail (as "The Castle Aaaaarrrrrrggghhh")
- Highlander: Endgame
- Sense8 (as the estate of the "Old Man of Hoy")
- Black Mirror, "Loch Henry"

Castle Stalker is the inspiration for Castle Keep in the children's book The Boggart.
