= Boggart Hole Clough =

Woodland and park near Manchester, England

Coordinates: 53°31′16″N 2°12′16″W

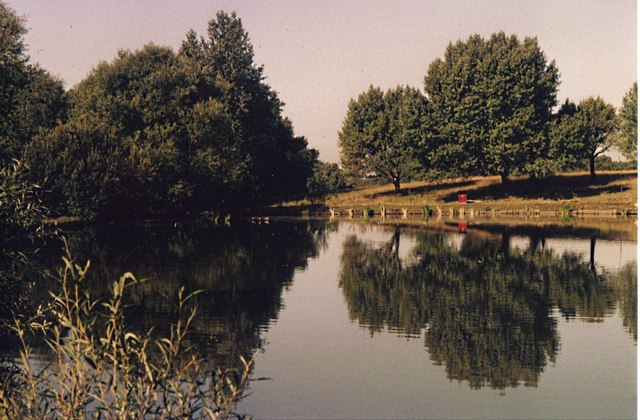
Boggart Hole Clough fishing pond

Boggart Hole Clough is a large woodland and urban country park in Blackley, a suburb of Manchester, England. It occupies an area of approximately 76 hectares (190 acres), part of an ancient woodland, with picturesque cloughs varying from steep ravines to sloping gullies. Clough is a local dialect word for a steep sided, wooded valley. Boggart Hole Clough was designated a Local Nature Reserve in 2008.

Historically, local activists used Boggart Hole Clough for open air meetings but in 1896, when Manchester City Council acquired the land they tried to stop these meetings by fining speakers. The speakers rebelled by refusing to pay the fines and the publicity increased audiences from hundreds to tens of thousands. National figures began to attend, including Keir Hardie. A women's suffrage demonstration of 15,000 was held at Boggart Hole Clough on 15 July 1906 where a group of men caused a disturbance that was reported in the Manchester Guardian. Veteran suffragist campaigner Elizabeth Clarke Wolstenholme Elmy attended and wrote an account of being caught up in the scrum.

The park stages a number of cross-country events and mountain bike rides, along with summer fundays and an annual bonfire and firework display. It also provides facilities for a number of other activities, ranging from boating to athletics. Boggart Hole Clough featured in the childhood memories of ex-Manchester City footballer Fred Eyre in his autobiography "Kicked Into Touch", who lived in the adjacent Clough Top Road.

Local folklore holds that the clough is haunted by a boggart, a mischievous spirit found mainly in Lancashire and Yorkshire, perhaps in an attempt to explain the unusual name. In 2008, Boggart Hole Clough attained the Green Flag Award for the eighth consecutive year.

Boggart Hole Brook rises in the clough.
