= Seventh Son (film) =

2014 film by Sergei Bodrov

- Theatrical release poster
- Directed by: Sergei Bodrov
- Screenplay by: Charles Leavitt; Steven Knight
- Story by: Matt Greenberg
- Based on: The Spook's Apprentice by Joseph Delaney
- Produced by: Basil Iwanyk; Thomas Tull; Lionel Wigram
- Starring: Jeff Bridges; Ben Barnes; Alicia Vikander; Kit Harington; Olivia Williams; Antje Traue; Djimon Hounsou; Julianne Moore
- Cinematography: Newton Thomas Sigel
- Edited by: Paul Rubell; Jim Page; Michael Kahn
- Music by: Marco Beltrami
- Production companies: Legendary Pictures; Moving Picture Company; Outlaw Sinema; Pendle Mountain Productions; Thunder Road Pictures; China Film Group; Beijing Skywheel Entertainment
- Distributed by: Universal Pictures
- Release dates: December 17, 2014 (France); February 6, 2015 (United States)
- Running time: 102 minutes
- Countries: United States; Canada; China; United Kingdom
- Language: English
- Budget: $95–110 million
- Box office: $114 million

Seventh Son is a 2014 action fantasy film directed by Sergei Bodrov, and starring Ben Barnes, Jeff Bridges, Alicia Vikander, Kit Harington, Olivia Williams, Antje Traue, Djimon Hounsou and Julianne Moore. It is loosely based on the 2004 novel The Spook's Apprentice by Joseph Delaney. The story centers on Thomas Ward, a seventh son of a seventh son, and his adventures as the apprentice of the Spook.

After having its release date shifted numerous times, the film was released in France on December 17, 2014, and in Canada and the United States on February 6, 2015, by Universal Pictures. The film was a box office failure, and received generally negative reviews from film critics and earned $114 million against a production budget of $95 million.

== Plot ==
In 1572, the witch Malkin is imprisoned underground by Gregory, the last of the Falcons, a knightly order which defended mankind against supernatural threats. Years later, Gregory works as a "spook" – a roving witch hunter.

Malkin escapes, killing Gregory's apprentice William, and flees to her mountain fortress. She restores the fortress and the beauty of her disfigured, loyal sister, Bony Lizzie. The coming centennial blood moon will make Malkin unstoppable.

Gregory seeks out Tom Ward – the seventh son of a seventh son – as his new apprentice. Tom's Mam gives him her necklace as a talisman, urging him to never take it off. In a town, Tom sees a girl, Alice, about to be burned as a witch. Recognizing her from his clairvoyant visions, Tom frees her. Alice requests that he not tell Gregory about her. She is revealed to be Lizzie's daughter, sent to spy on Gregory. Malkin begins gathering an army of minions.

Tom meets Gregory's assistant, Tusk. With only a week before the blood moon is full, reviving Malkin's full power, Tom must rush through his training while the trio head to Malkin's fortress. En route, Gregory is summoned to a walled city by an inquisitor whose forces have subdued one of Malkin's followers, a werebear named Urag. Tom hesitates when instructed to burn the werebear alive, causing Gregory to dismiss him and light the flame himself. Tom meets Alice again; the two share their feelings for each other and fall in love. They briefly consider running away, but Tom has a vision of Malkin killing Gregory and unleashing destruction upon the world. Tom returns to Gregory, who reveals that he once loved Malkin, leading him to imprison rather than kill her. Gregory feels responsible for every person killed by Malkin, and warns Tom never to show mercy to witches.

The trio are attacked on the road by an enormous boggart. Tom kills it and survives being swept down a waterfall. He is confronted by Bony Lizzie, whose attack is repelled by his Mam's necklace. Gregory recognizes it as the Umbran Stone, which increases the power of witches. It had once belonged to Malkin, until one of her witch followers – Tom's Mam – stole it, weakening Malkin enough for Gregory to trap her.

Malkin instructs Alice to steal the stone, promising to spare Tom's life. Malkin and her minions destroy the city where Urag was killed, to avenge his death. By chance, Tom's family is in the city; his Mam kills the warlock Strix and confronts Malkin with her own powers. Malkin kills her, mocking her for giving away the stone that might have saved her life.

Alice finds Tom and pleads with him to leave with her. Gregory tries to kill her, but Tom intervenes, allowing her to flee. Gregory points out she has taken the necklace, and Tom, Gregory and Tusk pursue her. Malkin's servant Radu attacks them; he captures Gregory and drives Tusk and Tom over a cliff, leaving them for dead. Tom wakes to a vision of his Mam telling him that, as both the seventh son of a seventh son, and the son of a witch, he has a unique power to defeat Malkin.

The witches gather as Malkin attempts to seduce Gregory. Alice is horrified when told that Tom is dead, and grabs the stone from Malkin, breaking Malkin's hold on Gregory. Malkin transforms into a dragon, and Lizzie also transforms, to protect her daughter. Tom retrieves the stone and, fighting together, Gregory, Tom and Alice kill several of Malkin's minions. Malkin kills Lizzie, but is seriously wounded. Gregory follows Malkin into her room and confronts her. Appearing close to death, she recalls their relationship, but then seizes Gregory with her claws. Tom enters and hurls a blade at Malkin, making her release her grip. Tom kills Malkin and they burn her body.

Gregory brands Tom's hand, declaring him a Falcon knight. Alice accepts that Tom's vocation means they cannot be together, but promises they will meet again. Gregory leaves for parts unknown, leaving Tom and Tusk to continue his work, but urging Tom not to follow the "rules".

== Cast ==
- Jeff Bridges as Master Gregory
- Ben Barnes as Tom Ward
- Julianne Moore as Mother Malkin
- Alicia Vikander as Alice
- Olivia Williams as Mam Ward
- Antje Traue as Bony Lizzie
- John DeSantis as Tusk
- Jason Scott Lee as Urag
- Djimon Hounsou as Radu
- Kit Harington as Mr. (William) Bradley
- Gerard Plunkett as Inquisitor

== Production ==
Sam Claflin was in negotiations to star as Tom Ward, but in June 2011, negotiations with Claflin fell through and Ben Barnes replaced him. Production began on March 19, 2012, in Vancouver, British Columbia. In February 2014, Legendary Pictures agreed to give $5 million to recently bankrupt visual effects company Rhythm & Hues Studios so they would complete their work on Seventh Son.

By the time production wrapped, the budget had ballooned to as much as $110 million. In addition to investment from studios Legendary Pictures, Moving Picture Company, Outlaw Sinema, Pendle Mountain Productions, Beijing Skywheel Entertainment Co. and Thunder Road Pictures, China Film Group made an "eight-figure" equity investment in the film, as well as the adaptation of Warcraft (2016).

== Music ==
It was originally announced that A. R. Rahman and Tuomas Kantelinen would compose the score for the movie. However, in July 2013, Rahman left the project due to scheduling conflicts. A. R. Rahman revealed that he backed out from the project to compose for Kaaviya Thalaivan, a Tamil historical fiction film, because it gave him the scope to innovate with folk music like never before. Subsequently, in December 2013, Kantelinen was replaced by Marco Beltrami.

== Release ==
The film was originally scheduled for release on February 15, 2013, but was moved back to October 18, 2013, to complete post-production. It was moved again to January 17, 2014, due to the film's production partner Legendary Pictures parting ways with Warner Bros., who were initially intended to distribute the film. On August 15, 2013, it was announced that Legendary had sold the distribution rights to their new partner Universal Studios, which pulled the film again. On November 27, 2013, it was announced that the film was pushed back to February 6, 2015. The film premiered in France on December 17, 2014.

=== Home media ===
Universal Pictures Home Entertainment released Seventh Son on DVD and Blu-ray Disc on May 26, 2015.

== Reception ==
=== Box office ===
The month before its release, Seventh Son featured in a list of "The Riskiest Box Office Bets of 2015" published by Screen Rant.

In the US and Canada, Seventh Son grossed $17.2 million, with $97.0 million in other territories, for a worldwide total of $114 million, against a budget of $95 million to $110 million. It opened at No. 4, its first of two consecutive weeks in the Top 10 at the domestic box office.

Barely surpassing its basic production cost, the film was a commercial disaster, according to Variety, which predicted a "projected loss of $85 million".

=== Critical response ===
On Rotten Tomatoes, a review aggregator, the film has an approval rating of 12% based on 119 reviews and an average rating of 3.9/10. The site's critical consensus reads, "Seventh Son squanders an excellent cast and some strange storyline ingredients, leaving audiences with one disappointingly dull fantasy adventure." On Metacritic, the film has a score of 30 out of 100 based 32 critics, indicating "generally unfavorable reviews". Audiences polled by CinemaScore gave the film an average grade of "B−" on an A+ to F scale.

Peter Debruge of Variety gave a negative review criticizing the film's tired plot, special effects, lack of chemistry, and of the cast's performances such as that of Bridges' and Moore's, and calling the film an "over-designed" and "under-conceived fantasy epic". The Hollywood Reporter's Jordan Mintzer writes that it "takes an A-list crew and cast—including Moore sporting a black feather dress and matching eyeliner—and goes nowhere new with it, investing lots in VFX and locations but not enough in an original story anyone cares about". Los Angeles Times' Betsey Sharkey said that the movie would "certainly be a contender" for "the worst movie of the year"; she notes, "For acclaimed Russian director Bodrov, this foray into English-language filmmaking is a rare fail. Bodrov certainly knows his way around epics, as his excellent Oscar-nominated films Mongol and Prisoner of the Mountains attest. Seventh comes as a shock. Virtually every performance falls flat, aided no doubt by the vapid dialogue. And Bridges is saddled with an awful accent he never masters." USA Today's Claudia Puig says, "The 3-D effects are off-putting: Smoke spills out at the audience, and the camera swooshes high and careens over cliffs. It's more dizzying than dazzling. Further mucking up the attempts at magical fantasy is a distracting, bombastic musical score and feeble attempts at humor. Seventh Son is thoroughly ill-conceived, a pale imitation of its more adventurous and breathtaking brethren." The Guardian's Jordan Hoffman gave the movie two out of five stars and explained, "While Seventh Son has trace of Saturday afternoon fun, its unoriginal nature gets the better of it... There are flashes where you think Seventh Son is going to be wise enough to put a spin on the standard script, but by the end it just devolves into another loud, messy CGI brawl. How much more ruined masonry can moviegoers take? A lot, it seems, as this genre seems to be in no danger of going away."

The New York Daily News' Joe Neumaier was more complimentary of Moore's and Bridges' leading performances. "Saints be praised for whatever strange magic brought Bridges and Moore together for their own little mini–Big Lebowski reunion, whether it was playfulness, paychecks or an open spot on their calendars. Because they save this mediocre medieval fantasy adventure from the ash heap."
