= John Harland =

English reporter and antiquarian (1806–1868)

John Harland (1806–1868) was an English reporter and antiquary.

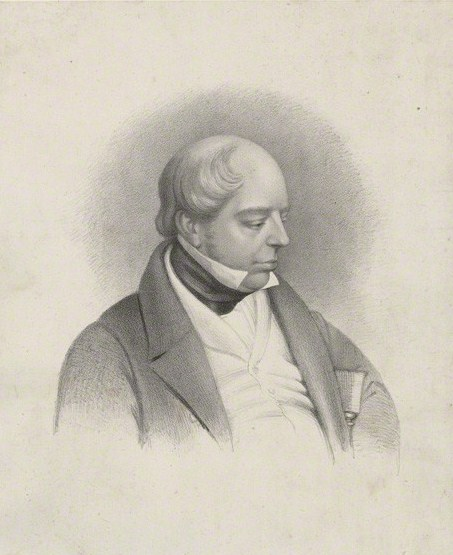
John Harland, lithograph portrait

== Life ==
Harland was born at Kingston upon Hull, and learned the trade of printing. He gained facility in shorthand, and a report in 1830 of a sermon by John Gooch Robberds led to his name being mentioned to John Edward Taylor, of the Manchester Guardian. Taylor went to Hull to hire Harland.

Harland was head of the reporting staff of the Guardian until 1860, when he retired because of lameness. He died in Manchester on 23 April 1868.

== Works ==
Harland edited 14 volumes for the Chetham Society in 13 years. He also published collections of Lancashire Lyrics and Lancashire Ballads, and, in conjunction with T. T. Wilkinson of Burnley, Lancashire Folklore. He wrote the history of Sawley Abbey, near Clitheroe, Yorkshire, and was revising Edward Baines's Lancashire at the time of his death.

== Notes ==
Attribution

This article incorporates text from a publication now in the public domain: Stephen, Leslie; Lee, Sidney, eds. (1890). "Harland, John". Dictionary of National Biography. Vol. 24. London: Smith, Elder & Co.
