= Abhuman =

Literary neologism

Abhuman is a term used to distinguish a separation from normal human existence. This is different from inhuman, which typically connotes an ethical or moral separation from others.

The term was used by William Hope Hodgson in his 1912 novel The Night Land and his Carnacki stories. Similar concepts, although not the term itself, also appear in the works of Arthur Conan Doyle, Rudyard Kipling, and Bram Stoker among other notable American and British authors. The term is also used within the fictional universe of Warhammer 40,000 to refer to populations of humans who have mutated, naturally or otherwise, to adapt to extreme environmental conditions.

In literary studies of Gothic fiction, abhuman refers to a "Gothic body" or something that is only vestigially human and possibly in the process of becoming something monstrous, such as a vampire or werewolf. Kelly Hurley writes that the abhuman subject is "a not-quite-human subject, characterized by its morphic variability, continually in danger of becoming not-itself, becoming other".

Allan Lloyd-Smith writes that among "the sources of abhuman Gothic horror for many writers at this time were the urban squalor and misery of overcrowded cities".

== See also ==
- Abjection
- Autism
- Disability in horror films
- Low-life
