= List of Call of Cthulhu books =

Role-playing game list

This is a list of adventures and supplements published for the Call of Cthulhu role-playing game.

== Chaosium ==
=== Adventures ===
- Alone Against the Dark, Chaosium Inc., 1985.
- Alone Against the Wendigo, Chaosium Inc., 1983.
- The Asylum & Other Tales, Chaosium Inc., 1983.
- At Your Door, Chaosium Inc., 1990.
- Blood Brothers, Chaosium Inc., 1990.
- Blood Brothers 2, 1992
- The Compact Trail of Tsathogghua, 1997
- Cthulhu Casebook, Chaosium Inc., 1990.
- Cthulhu Classics, Chaosium Inc., 1990.
- Curse of Cthulhu, 1990
- Curse of the Chthonians, Chaosium Inc., 1984.
- Dark Designs, 1991
- The Dreaming Stone, 1997
- Fatal Experiments, 1990
- The Fungi from Yuggoth, Chaosium Inc., 1984, 1987.
- The Great Old Ones, Chaosium Inc., 1989.
- Horror on the Orient Express, 1991, 2014
- Horror's Heart, 1996
- In the Shadows, 1995
- Keeper's Compendium, 1993
- King of Chicago, 1994
- Mansions of Madness, Chaosium Inc., 1990.
- Masks of Nyarlathotep, Chaosium Inc., 1984, 1989, 1996, 2010, 2018.
- No Man's Land, Chaosium Inc., 1990.
- The Order of the Stone, 2025
- A Resection of Time, 1997
- Shadows of Yog-Sothoth, Chaosium Inc., 1982.
- Spawn of Azathoth, Chaosium Inc., 1986.
- The Stars Are Right! 1992
- Tales of the Miskatonic Valley, 1991
- Terror from the Stars, Chaosium Inc., 1989.
- The Thing at the Threshold, Chaosium Inc., 1992
- Trail of Tsathogghua, Chaosium Inc., 1984.
- Unseen Masters, 2001

=== Supplements ===
- 1920s Investigators' Companion
- Arkham Unveiled, Chaosium Inc., 1990.
- The Bermuda Triangle, 1998
- The Cairo Guidebook
- Call of Cthulhu Investigator Sheets
- Call of Cthulhu Keeper's Screen
- The Compact Arkham Unveiled
- Cthulhu by Gaslight
- Cthulhu Companion, Chaosium Inc., 1983.
- Cthulhu Now, Chaosium Inc., 1987.
- Dire Documents
- Encyclopedia Cthulhiana
- Fragments of Fear: The Second Cthulhu Companion, Chaosium Inc., 1985.
- Green and Pleasant Land, Chaosium Inc./Games Workshop, 1987.
- H.P. Lovecraft's Dreamlands, Chaosium Inc., 1988.
- The Keeper's Companion
- The Keeper's Companion 2
- Kingsport: The City in the Mists
- The London Guidebook
- Miskatonic U. Graduate Kit, Chaosium Inc.,
- Ramsey Campbell's Goatswood and Less Pleasant Places, 2001
- S. Petersen's Field Guide to Creatures of the Dreamlands, Chaosium Inc., 1989.
- S. Petersen's Field Guide to Cthulhu Monsters, Chaosium Inc., 1988.
- Taint of Madness
- Terror Australis: Call of Cthulhu in the Land Down Under, Chaosium Inc., 1987.
- Ye Booke of Monstres
- Ye Booke of Monstres II

== Other publishers ==
=== ADP Systems ===
- The Armstrong Malison
- The Curse
- The Preacher and the Cross

=== Cubicle 7 Entertainment ===
- Cthulhu Britannica
- Cthulhu Britannica: Folklore
- Avalon - The County of Somerset
- Shadows over Scotland
- Cthulhu Britannica: London box set
- Cthulhu Britannica: London The Curse of Nineveh
- Cthulhu Britannica: Cards from the Smoke
- Cthulhu Britannica Thompsons Journal
- Cthulhu Britannica Neves Journal
- World War Cthulhu

=== Games Workshop ===
- Nightmare in Norway, Games Workshop, 1985.
- The Statue of the Sorcerer & The Vanishing Conjurer, Games Workshop, 1986.
- Trail of the Loathsome Slime, Games Workshop, 1985.

=== Grenadier Models ===
- The Horrible Secret of Monhegan Island, Grenadier Models, 1986.

=== Jeux Descartes ===
- Les Années Folles: Investigations dans la France des Années 20, Jeux Descartes, 1988

=== Pagan Publishing ===
- Coming Full Circle
- The Golden Dawn
- Machinations of the Mi-Go
- Walker in the Wastes (1994)

=== Triad Entertainments ===
- Lurking Fears
- Grimrock Island
- Whispers in the Dark
- End of the World
- Dwellers in Shadow
- Return to Lovecraft Country

=== Theater of the Mind Enterprises ===
- The Arkham Evil
- Death in Dunwich
- Whispers from the Abyss
- Pursuit to Kadath
- "Glozel est Authentique!"
