= Cthulhu Classics =

Tabletop horror role-playing game supplement

A Full Length Campaign & Five Thrilling Adventures
- Cover by Lee Gibbons
- Designers: Sandy Petersen; Scott David Aniolowski; John Carnahan; Scott Clegg; Ed Gore; David A. Hargrave; Marc Hutchison; Doug Lyons; Randy McCall; Mark Pettigrew; Michael Szymanski
- Publishers: Chaosium
- Publication: 1989; 36 years ago
- Genres: Horror
- Systems: Basic Role-Playing
- ISBN: 978-0933635616

Cthulhu Classics is an anthology of adventures published by Chaosium in 1989 for the horror role-playing game Call of Cthulhu.

== Description ==
Cthulhu Classics is a 152-page perfect-bound softcover book written by Sandy Petersen, Scott David Aniolowski, John Carnahan, Scott Clegg, Ed Gore, David A. Hargrave, Marc Hutchison, Doug Lyons, Randy McCall, Mark Pettigrew, and Michael Szymanski, and eight different color plates by Nick Smith and Tom Sullivan, and cover art by Lee Gibbons.

== Contents ==
Cthulhu Classics is an anthology containing a previously published campaign and five shorter adventures that were previously published in Cthulhu Companion, Curse of the Cthonians, Shadows of Yog-Sothoth, and Terror from the Stars. These include:

- "Shadows of Yog-Sothoth", the first Call of Cthulhu campaign published by Chaosium in 1982 — seven sequential adventures that pit Investigators against the Hermetic Order of the Silver Twilight, who are attempting to raise the lost city of R'lyeh from the depths of the Pacific Ocean, thereby unleashing the Elder God Cthulhu.
- "The Warren"
- "Dark Carnival"
- "The Pits of Bendal-Dolum"
- "Temple of the Moon"
- "Secret of Castronegro", in which a New Mexico town is under the influence of a sinister force

There are also several player handouts that can be removed from the book.

== Reception ==
Stephan Wieck reviewed Cthulhu Classics for White Wolf #20, rating it 5 out of 5 overall, and stated that " If you have yet to play Shadows of Yog-Sothoth, then Cthulhu Classics is for you. The book will provide most gaming groups with at least six months worth of terror and SANity loss."

In the June 1990 edition of Dragon (Issue 158), Jim Bambra evaluated each of the included adventures. He called Shadows of Yog-Sothoth "good, but it is not as slickly written or plotted as [another Chaosium publication] Masks of Nyarlathotep; but he admitted that it contains "excellent scenes" where "horror elements are well presented." Looking at the five shorter adventures, Bambra thought Secret of Castronegro was the best of the five. He called Dark Carnival and The Warren "serviceable". The remaining two, set in the jungle, were "too short on library research and investigation, and too high on unavoidable sanity-blasting horrors for my taste." He concluded, "While I have reservations about some of the adventures, the inclusion of Shadows of Yog-Sothoth makes it worth buying. For those groups that don’t have time to undertake larger campaigns, the five short adventures will come in very handy."

== Reviews ==
- Games Review (Volume 2, Issue 8 – May 1990)
