= Call of Cthulhu Keeper's Screen =

Tabletop horror role-playing game supplement

- Cover by Tom Sullivan
- Designers: Chaosium
- Publishers: Chaosium
- Publication: 1985 1st edition; 1988 2nd edition
- Genres: Horror
- Systems: Basic Role-Playing
- ISBN: 978-1-56882-410-9

Call of Cthulhu Keeper's Screen is a 1985 role-playing game supplement for Call of Cthulhu published by Chaosium.

== Contents ==
Call of Cthulhu Keeper's Screen is a three-panel cardstock gamemaster's screen with tables to help the gamemaster keep track of ranged and melee weapons, monsters, spells, rules for sanity loss and fictional Mythos books. The Keeper's Screen features tables for combat, magic, and skills, with third edition Call of Cthulhu rules data; the second version of the screen also includes the "knock-out" rule, and weapons data from the supplements Cthulhu Now and Cthulhu by Gaslight.

== Publication history ==
Keeper's Screen features art by Tom Sullivan, and was published by Chaosium, Inc., in 1985 as a cardstock screen. A second edition was published in 1988 and says "New Edition" on the cover.

== Reception ==
Guy Hail reviewed Call of Cthulhu Keeper's Screen in Space Gamer/Fantasy Gamer No. 80. Hail commented that "The new tables will settle some disputes about thrown weapons, and a Keeper should have a cthuloid screen to hide his secrets from nosy investigators, but Chaosium should have used this opportunity to cumulate Call of Cthulhu's monsters and spells in a single supplement."

== Reviews ==
- Challenge #38 (1989)
- Envoyer (German) (Issue 46 - Aug 2000)
