= Cthulhu Casebook =

Horror role-playing game supplement

A Plethora of Plots and Adventures
- Cover art by Nick Smith
- Designers: William A. Barton; William James Hamblin III; Randy McCall; Mark Harmon; David A. Hargrave; Mike Willner; Scott Clegg; Elizabeth Wolcott; Ben Monroe; Keith Herber
- Publishers: Chaosium
- Publication: 1990; 35 years ago
- Genres: Horror
- Systems: Basic Role-Playing

Cthulhu Casebook, subtitled "A Plethora of Plots and Adventures", is a collection of adventures published by Chaosium in 1990 for the horror role-playing game Call of Cthulhu, itself based on the works of H.P. Lovecraft.

== Contents ==
Cthulhu Casebook is a collection of nine previously published horror adventure scenarios for the 4th edition of Call of Cthulhu. Seven short adventures are taken from The Asylum & Other Tales (1983):

- "The Auction" by Randy McCall
- "The Madman" by Mark Harmon
- "Black Devil Mountain" by David Hargrave
- "The Asylum" by Randy McCall
- "The Mauretania" by M.B. Willner
- "Gate from the Past" by John Scott Clegg
- "Westchester House" by Elizabeth Wolcott

Two adventures are taken from Curse of the Cthonians (1984):

- "The Curse of Chaugnar Faugn" by Bill Barton
- "Thoth's Dagger"by William Hamblin

All the adventures have been revised to be compliant with 4th edition rules. In addition, some new material is included:

- "The ten commandments of Cthulhu hunting": Advice on how to play an Investigator by Sandy Petersen.
- "Sinister Seeds": Eleven story hooks for Keepers
- Death Reports: Examples of grisly deaths caused by creatures of the Mythos, to be used as inspiration by Keepers.
- "Insta-plots": A Plot generation table.

Four pages of player handouts are included, although these are not perforated and must be either cut out of the book or photocopied.

== Publication history ==
Chaosium first released the horror role-playing game Call of Cthulhu in 1981, and regularly refreshed it with new editions containing revamped rules. The fourth edition's release in 1989 sparked a line of products that game historian Stu Horvath called "the golden age for the line". One of these products was Cthulhu Casebook, a collection of material written by William A. Barton, William James Hamblin III, Randy McCall, Mark Harmon, David A. Hargrave, Mike Willner, Scott Clegg, Elizabeth Wolcott, Ben Monroe, and Keith Herber, with cover art by Nick Smith, interior art by Lisa A. Free, Charlie Krank, Nick Smith, Tom Sullivan, and Arnie Swekel, and cartography by Yurek Chodak and Sherman Kahn. It was published by Chaosium in 1990 as a 144-page softcover book.

== Reception ==
In Issue 26 of White Wolf (April/May, 1991), Wayne Ligon thought the seven short adventures pulled from The Asylum & Other Tales "are small snippets of horror that can be dropped in when the Keeper desires, representing common occurrences and locales frequented by Investigators." But Ligon thought the two adventures from Curse of the Cthonians "are truly worthy of the game", calling 'The Curse of Chaugnar Faugn' "30 pages of mind-blasting terror" although Lighon warned "It is quite complex, even more so than many other adventures, and should be read carefully." Ligon concluded by giving the book a rating of 4 out of 5, saying, "On the whole, The Cthulhu Casebook provides a number of interesting plots and adventures for the game, and should be a definite addition to your library."

In Issue 47 of White Dwarf, Jon Sutherland reviewed the adventures originally appearing in The Asylum & Other Tales and called these "short interesting adventures. I have always thought that scenarios go on too long and the vitality of the story and the players tail off."

In Issue 59 of White Dwarf, Stephen Kyle reviewed the adventures originally appearing in Curse of the Chthonians and liked the adventure "The Curse of Chaugnar Faugn", commenting "The party will need all their sanity to survive this one, and there's worse to come!" Referring to "Thoth's Dagger", Kyle wrote that it was "full of linguistic and Kabbalistic twists, which must be solved by the Investigators if they are to get anywhere."

== Other recognition ==
A copy of Cthulhu Casebook is held in the Edwin and Terry Murray Collection of Role-Playing Games at Duke University.

== Other reviews ==
- The Annotated Unspeakable Oath (Issue 1 - 1993)
