= The Arkham Evil =

Call of Cthulhu adventure

- Designers: John Diaper; Bob Gallagher; Steve Rawling
- Publishers: Theatre of the Mind Enterprises
- Publication: 1983; 42 years ago
- Genres: Horror
- Systems: Basic Role-Playing

The Arkham Evil is a 1983 role-playing game adventure for Call of Cthulhu published by Theatre of the Mind Enterprises.

== Contents ==
The Arkham Evil is a scenario book which consists of three individual but interconnected adventures intended for a single group of player characters.

== Reception ==
William A. Barton reviewed The Arkham Evil in Space Gamer No. 64. Barton commented that "though not as well conceived or executed as Chaosium's own recent Shadows of Yog-Sothoth scenario book, The Arkham Evil, in the hands of a competent (fiendish?) Keeper, should provide several sanity-threatening sessions into the world of the Cthulhu Mythos for the unwary player-character."

Larry DiTillio reviewed The Arkham Evil for Different Worlds magazine and stated that "Overall, The Arkham Evil is a fine piece of work. Its atmosphere and detail are literally staggering. Historical characters like Pancho Villa and the Molly Maguires (a band of miners who used terrorist activity to fight for better pay and conditions) are used to good purpose, being manipulated by non-player characters in a sort of Illuminati conspiracy style."

Jon Sutherland reviewed The Arkham Evil for White Dwarf #48, giving it an overall rating of 7 out of 10, and stated that "Arkham did not really live up to the expectations or the quality it promised in the first part of the adventure."

Richard Lee reviewed The Arkham Evil for Imagine magazine, and stated that "the plot was intriguing, but out of control. Druidic rituals, terrorist miners, fated asteroids end unlikely German barons just don't tie together. Result? Contrivance on a massive scale. The players are bundled from scene to scene like puppets, reeling as unexplained 'happenings' bombard them from every side... A pity, since many scenes were potentially quite interesting."
