= Dark Designs =

Tabletop horror role-playing game adventure

- Cover art by Lee Gibbons
- Designers: David Hallett; Kevin Jacklin; L.N. Isinwyll
- Publishers: Chaosium
- Publication: 1991; 34 years ago
- Genres: Horror
- Systems: Basic Role-Playing

Dark Designs is a collection of adventures published by Chaosium for the horror role-playing game Call of Cthulhu, itself based on the works of H.P. Lovecraft. Critics were generally not impressed with the product.

== Description ==
Dark Designs is a collection of three adventures set in Victorian London of the 1890s:

1. "Eyes for the Blind" (written by David Hallett, with L.N. Isinwyll): The Investigators witness a murder on a train, and become involved with a conspiracy that ranges from the Royal Regatta at Henley-on-Thames through London to Cornwall.
2. "The Menace from Sumatra" (written by Kevin W. Jacklin, with L.N. Isinwyll): The Investigators witness the bizarre death of a blind man, a scientist who has just returned from Sumatra. They must deal with a deadly fog, a ship from Sumatra and a "blue plague". Critic Tristan Lhomme called this a very Sherlockian adventure based on The Giant Rat of Sumatra.
3. "Lord of the Dance" (written by David Hallett): A sequel to the first adventure. The INvestigators are called to an insane asylum, where a young woman has suddenly and unexpectedly been admitted. Les Dean and John Tynes called it unoriginal but "by far the best of the three adventures."

== Publication history ==
Chaosium published the horror role-playing game Call of Cthulhu, based on the works of H.P. Lovecraft, in 1981, and it proved popular. Chaosium responded by releasing many adventures for it, as well as several editions of the rules, including Cthulhu by Gaslight, a Victorian setting. In 1991 Chaosium released a collection of three adventures for Cthulhu by Gaslight by David Hallett, L.N. Isinwyll and Kevin W. Jacklin that was published as a 128-page softcover book that included a map of railway lines in southern England and Wales, a guide for creating characters in Victorian London, and a map of London.

== Reception ==
In Issue 29 of White Wolf, Wayne Ligon stated that "An important addition to this book is a summary of CoC character generation as it applies to the 1890's. No changes are made to Cthulhu By Gaslight, save that everyone is assumed to be Upper Class. An 1890's-specific character sheet and a summary of period weapons are also included. The whole lot is reproduced in the perforated handout section for easy distribution. This is a great idea, and I hope that it is repeated for the '20s and '90s." Ligon concluded by rating it 3 out of 5.

In Issue 23 of The Unspeakable Oath, Les Dean and John Tynes admired the cover art by Lee Gibbons, but found the cover art and two maps "are the best part of Dark Designs." They did like the villain in the first adventure, but found the first and second adventures were bloated — "both go to show that Chaosium pays by the word ... [they] could have been done in half to two-thirds of that." Dean and Tynes gave the book a poor rating of 3 out of 10.

In Issue 112 of the French games magazine Casus Belli, Tristan Lhomme thought the three adventures were "good Victorian scenarios" but "They only lack a spark of genius to be exciting."
