= The Stars Are Right! =

Tabletop role-playing game supplement

- Publishers: Chaosium
- Publication: 1992; 34 years ago
- Genres: Horror
- Systems: Basic Role-Playing

The Stars Are Right! is a 1992 role-playing adventure for Call of Cthulhu published by Chaosium.

== Plot summary ==
The Stars Are Right! is a collection of eight adventure scenarios set in the 1990s:

1. "Love's Lonely Children" by Richard Watts
2. "Nemo Solis Sapit" by John Scott Tynes
3. "This Fire Shall Kill" by André Bishop
4. "The Professionals" by Fred Behrendt
5. "Fractal Gods" by Steve Hatherly
6. "The Gates of Delirium" by Gary Sumpter
7. "The Music of the Spheres" by Kevin Ross
8. "When the Stars Came Right Again" by Steven C. Rasmussen and D. H. Frew

Two additional scenarios are included in the 2004 edition:

1. "Darkest Calling" by David Conyers
2. "The Source and the End" by William Jones

== Reception ==
William Hale reviewed The Stars Are Right in White Wolf #33 (Sept./Oct. 1992), rating it a 4 out of 5 and stated that "The only things missing in this supplement are source materials for the game. I believe players and Keepers alike would enjoy seeing more information pertaining to new professions and new skills which could be integrated into the game. This would make an outstanding supplement such as this truly complete but is otherwise the only negative feature of a brilliant product."

== Reviews ==
- Dragon (Issue 191 - Mar 1993)
