= At Your Door =

Horror role-playing game supplement

A Campaign of Terror and Madness in the Days to Come
- Cover art by Lee Gibbons
- Designers: L.N. Isynwill; Mark Morrison; Barbara Manui; Chris Adams; Scott D. Aniolowski; Herbert Hike
- Publishers: Chaosium
- Publication: 1990; 35 years ago
- Genres: Horror
- Systems: Basic Role-Playing

At Your Door, subtitled "A Campaign of Terror and Madness in the Days to Come", is a campaign published by Chaosium in 1990 for the horror role-playing game Call of Cthulhu, specifically for a present-day variant of the game called Cthulhu Now. Both are based on the works of H.P. Lovecraft.

== Plot summary ==
At Your Door is campaign book containing six linked adventure scenarios set in the present day in the fictional California city of Samson, as well as Toronto, Canada. The first five scenarios can be played in any order; the sixth scenario, the climax, must be played after the first five.

The book includes 23 pages of perforated pull-out player handouts, and 147 pages devoted to the six adventures.

== Publication history ==
Chaosium published the horror role-playing game Call of Cthulhu in 1981. The game was originally set in the 1920s. To provide some variety, in 1987 Chaosium released Cthulhu Now, a modern-day campaign setting. The At Your Door campaign, written by L.N. Isynwill, Mark Morrison, Barbara Manui, Chris Adams, Scott D. Aniolowski, and Herbert Hike, with cover art by Lee Gibbons and interior illustrations by Earl Geier, was published by Chaosium in 1990 as a 176-page softcover book.

Shannon Appelcline commented that after the publication of fourth edition Call of Cthulhu, "The modern Cthulhu Now setting even got some love with the At Your Door (1990) adventure anthology — best known for its introduction of disguised Shoggoth 'Mr. Shiny,' who became a sort of Chaosium mascot for several years."

== Reception ==
In Issue 26 of White Wolf #26 (April/May 1991), Wayne Ligon warned "Do not expect to sit down and polish it off in a single session. With multiple plot threads and lots of detective work, this adventure could easily take 7–10 weeks if play." Ligon regretted that no map of Samson was provided, but called the campaign "strong and rich, with multiple encounters and the possibility for learning a good deal more than you ever wanted to about specifics of the Mythos." Ligon concluded by giving this book a rating of 4 out of 5, saying, "This is an excellent addition to any Keeper's campaign, and could dovetail nicely into Cthulhu Now."

In Issue 46 of Challenge, Lester W. Smith called these adventures "imaginative, with lots of detail to involve players deeply in the course of events." Smith noted the lethal nature, commenting, "While the campaign is truly horrific, and player character losses are likely to be high, a rationale allows new PCs to benefit from the discoveries of their unfortunate predecessors." Smith commented on the overly elaborate language often used, calling it "inappropriately inflated language" and "ponderous". Despite this, Smith concluded, "Do I recommend At Your Door? Absolutely. It is very imaginative and is generally designed to make refereeing as easy as possible. It ought to be a lot of fun to play."

== Reviews ==
- Polyhedron #76

== Other recognition ==
A copy of Mansions of Madness is held in the Edwin and Terry Murray Collection of Role-Playing Games at Duke University.
