= The London Guidebook =

Tabletop horror role-playing game supplement

1920s Rolelaying in the Capital of the World
- Cover by Eric Vogt
- Designers: Lucya Szachnowski; Gary O'Connell
- Publishers: Chaosium
- Publication: 1996; 30 years ago
- Genres: Horror
- Systems: Basic Role-Playing
- ISBN: 1-56882-027-5

The London Guidebook is a supplement published by Chaosium in 1996 for the horror role-playing game Call of Cthulhu, itself based on the works of H.P. Lovecraft.

== Contents ==
The London Guidebook gives details about London during the 1920s, including several districts such as Tower of London, Hyde Park, Soho, Westminster and Mayfair, as well as the British Museum, and the city's clubs, hospitals, and transportation systems. The daily of life of the average citizen is detailed, and a blueprint of the Houses of Parliament is also included. Underground London is also highlighted, including the sewers and wells.

Occultism in London, popular after World War I, is highlighted, including occult study societies, sects, museums and libraries, well-known occultists such as Aleister Crowley and Arthur Conan Doyle, strange sciences being investigated such as aura photos and death rays, and recent unexplained events and archaeological discoveries.

A scenario set in London, "These Vile Bodies", based on the Evelyn Waugh novel of the same name, has the players investigate a mysterious death of a friend from London high society who is found floating in the Thames.

== Publication history ==
Chaosium published Call of Cthulhu in 1981, a horror role-playing game set in New England during the Jazz Age of the 1920s. Many adventures and supplements followed, as well as several editions of the rules. In 1995, Chaosium published The Cairo Guidebook to enable gamemasters to more accurately portray the Egyptian city in home campaigns. This was followed in 1995 by The London Guidebook, a 96-page softcover book written by Lucya Szachnowski and Gary O'Connell, and edited by Lynn Willis, with cover art by Eric Vogt and interior art by Dave Carson.

== Reception ==
In Issue 235 of Dragon (November 1996), Rick Swan was disappointed in this book, noting that most of the material could be found in a good library, that some of the material such as the date of the Chelsea Flower Show was simply trivia, and "the designers don’t do much to tie the material into the Cthulhu Mythos, beyond an occasional suggestion of supernatural activity." Swan concluded by giving this book a rating of only 3 out of 6, saying, "London Guidebook succeeds on its own terms, but before you invest, make sure you know what you’re getting."

In Issue 14/15 of The Unspeakable Oath, Alan Grohe called this book "a solid summary of the city's environs and atmosphere, and its inhabitants' lifestyles." Grohe thought that the strongest part of the book was focused on "the perspective of the poor, hospital treatment, law, and the common attitude toward police." Grohe concluded by giving this book a rating of 7.5 out of 10, saying, "While it contains nothing that couldn't be researched by anyone with time and access to historical materials, the book should prove useful to any Keeper setting scenarios in London."

In Issue 9 of the French games magazine Backstab, Thibsaid Béghin noted the "atmospheric details which will allow the Keepers to animate a very brilliant campaign with great credibility." Béghin liked the details of underground life, saying, "The evocation of the underground life of the capital is also exciting and will undoubtedly lead more than one Investigator into the heart of dark stench." The only disappointment was the illustrations, which Béghin pointed out were "few and far between, not very neat and rarely timely.There are some photos and other original documents, but they are poorly presented. The same goes for period maps, which could be very useful if they were legible." Béghin concluded by giving this book a rating of 8 out of 10.

In Issue 10 of the British game magazine Arcane, Paul Pettengale pointed out to his UK audience that "by basing scenarios in the British Isles you can do away with all of those dodgy fake American accents and copious references to American icons." Pettengale liked the illustrations, noting "the book is scattered with period photography, some of which is highly evocative, with a brooding, malevolent atmosphere.... Spot illustrations (both period and contemporary) are also used here to good effect, maintaining the typically high standard we've come to expect in Chaosium's range of roleplaying books and supplements." But Pettengale pointed out that the book's authors did not realize the magnitude of the traffic problem in London following World War I, "when the number of cars in Britain was rapidly approaching a million, and roads ... were still only really suitable for horse and cart — it's all too easy when playing CoC to forget just how much of a problem transportation was in the 1920s, especially in a major city." Pettengale's one disappointment was that only one short 4-page scenario was included. Pettengale concluded by giving this book a rating of 8 out of 10, saying, "The London Guidebook is absolutely essential for any referee who intends to run a campaign or a number of scenarios in 1920s London. It not only gives the all-important locational information, but also provides the referee with dozens of ideas as to how the places and people described can be used to good effect in various scenarios."
