= Bermuda Triangle (disambiguation) =

The Bermuda Triangle is a region in the western part of the North Atlantic Ocean where a number of aircraft and surface vessels allegedly disappeared mysteriously.

Bermuda Triangle may also refer to:

== Music ==
- Bermuda Triangle (album), a 2002 album by BucketHead
- "Bermuda Triangle" (song), a 1980 song by Barry Manilow
- "Bermuda Triangle", a song by Fleetwood Mac from their 1974 album Heroes Are Hard to Find
- Bermuda Triangle, a 1978 album by Isao Tomita
- Bermuda Triangle Band, an American folk rock band formed in 1967

== Amusement park rides ==
- Bermuda Triangle (Sea World), a former water ride of Sea World
- Bermuda Triangle: Alien Encounter, a water ride at Movie Park Germany

== Television ==
- "Bermuda Triangle", Destination Truth season 3, episode 6b (2009)
- "Bermuda Triangle", Is It Real? season 2, episode 8 (2006)
- "Bermuda Triangle", Jimbo and the Jet-Set episode 16 (1986)
- "Bermuda Triangle", Miami 7 episode 11 (1999)
- "Bermuda Triangle", Mystery Hunters season 1, episode 9 (2002)
- "Bermuda Triangle", Naked Science season 1, episode 6 (2004)
- "Bermuda Triangle", The Suite Life on Deck season 2, episode 11 (2009)
- "The Bermuda Triangle", In Search of... (original) season 1, episode 4 (1977)
- "The Bermuda Triangle", In Search of... (revival) season 2, episode 5 (2019)
- "The Bermuda Triangle", Inspector Gadget (1983) season 1, episode 28 (1983)
- "The Bermuda Triangle", Mysteries Decoded season 1, episode 6 (2019)
- "The Bermuda Triangle", Truth or Scare episode 12 (2003)

== Other uses ==
- The Bermuda Triangle (book), a 1974 book by Charles Berlitz
- The Bermuda Triangle (film), a 1978 film starring John Huston and Gloria Guida
- Bermuda Triangle, a 1982 video game by Data Age
- Bermuda Triangle (video game), a 1987 video game
- Bermuda Triangle: Colorful Pastrale, a 2019 anime TV series produced by Seven Arcs Pictures
- The Bermuda Triangle (Call of Cthulhu), a 1998 supplement for the role-playing game Call of Cthulhu
- Bermuda Triangle (Webnovel), a 2021 webnovel titled "Idle RPG: Lone Necromancer"

== See also ==
- The Triangle (TV miniseries), 2005 science fiction drama about the Bermuda Triangle
- Triangle (disambiguation)
