= King of Chicago (Call of Cthulhu) =

Horror fiction tabletop role-playing game supplement

- Cover art by Charlie Krank
- Designers: Gary Sumpter; Ugo Bardi; L.N. Isinwyll; Tadashi Ehara; Earl Geier
- Publishers: Chaosium
- Publication: 1994; 32 years ago
- Genres: Horror
- Systems: Basic Role-Playing
- ISBN: 1-56882-020-8

King of Chicago is a set of two adventures published by Chaosium in 1994 for the horror role-playing game Call of Cthulhu, itself based on the stories of H.P. Lovecraft.

== Description ==
King of Chicago contains two adventure that both feature gang wars from the 1920s:

- "King of Chicago" is set in 1920s Chicago at the height of gang warfare resulting from Prohibition. Investigators get a call from a private investigator, but he is murdered before they arrive. Their investigation will uncover a plot by an underworld boss to try to free an old evil in order to rule the city.
- "The Secret of Marseilles" is set in southern France in the 1920s, where the investigators are drawn into gang warfare when they witness a murder. The investigation will reveal that gangsters have joined forces with amphibious creatures from the sea.

== Publication history ==
Chaosium first published the horror roleplaying game Call of Cthulhu in 1981, and subsequently released several editions and many adventures for it. King of Chicago is a 63-page softcover book that was designed by Ugo Bardi, Tadashi Ehara, Lynn Willis (credited as "L.N. Isynwill"), and Gary Sumpter, with interior art by Earl Geier, and cover art by Charlie Krank.

== Reception ==
In Issue 214 of Dragon (February 1995), Rick Swan admired the "Smart stories [and] authentic atmosphere." But he noted that as a result of too many gangsters, there were not many monsters.

== Other reviews ==
- Valkyrie #1 (Sept., 1994)
- White Wolf Magazine Issue 40 (January 1994, p. 7)
