= Pursuit to Kadath =

Tabletop horror role-playing game supplement

- Cover by Lawrence L. Flournoy
- Designers: Bob Gallagher; E.S. Erkes
- Publishers: Theatre of the Mind Enterprises
- Publication: 1983; 42 years ago
- Genres: Horror
- Systems: Basic Role-Playing

Pursuit to Kadath is an adventure published in 1983 under license by Theatre of the Mind Enterprises (T.O.M.E.) for Chaosium's horror role-playing game Call of Cthulhu.

== Contents ==
Pursuit to Kadath is a scenario set in the 1920s in which the Investigators are students at the fictional Miskatonic University who all belong to the Sunday Club, which discusses paranormal activity. A lot of detail about the university is given, including student cost of living, class schedules, and other clubs. The Sunday Club holds a social evening at which they watch a demonstration of hypnotism, followed by a seance. The following morning, the student who was hypnotized robs a bank, attacks a police officer, and disappears. The adventure takes the investigators to New York City, Boston, Europe and Turkey.

The book also contains a connected short scenario, "The All-Seeing Eye of the Alskali", also set in Turkey, in which the characters investigate the disappearance of an archeologist.

== Publication history ==
Pursuit to Kadath, the third licensed scenario for Call of Cthulhu to be released by T.O.M.E., was written by Bob Gallagher and E.S. Erkes, with additional contributions by John Diaper, Lawrence L. Flournoy, C. Rawling, and Ed Wimble, and artwork by Joe Eagle, Lawrence L. Flournoy, Elizabeth Liss, Elaine Shatto, and Dawn Wilson. It was published by T.O.M.E. in 1983 as a 76-page book.

== Reception ==
Warren Spector reviewed Pursuit to Kadath for Fantasy Gamer magazine and stated that "Pursuit to Kadath gets an almost-unqualified rave. TOME has offered so much background information you don't even have to play Pursuit to Kadath to get your money's worth — you can just incorporate all the background information into your own campaign. And they've even included a second — albeit brief — scenario in the back of the book, You just can't ask for much more in an RPG module."

In the June 1984 edition of White Dwarf (Issue #54), Nic Grecas considered Pursuit to Kadath "a well-crafted scenario, a classic cocktail of mystery and mayhem, which takes the investigators from the familiar surroundings of the Miskatonic University right across the world in an attempt to prevent an acquaintance from performing an unspeakable ritual." Grecas did have some issues with T.O.M.E.'s idea of using authentic maps from the 1920s, calling it "a laudable idea, but marred by the fact that they have been reduced in size virtually to the point of complete illegibility." He also some had some issues with the background mythos, which he did not think squared with either the writings of H.P. Lovecraft or with Chaosium's Call of Cthulhu products. He concluded by giving the supplement an above average rating of 8 out of 10, saying, "Pursuit to Kadath is a fine scenario which, if well managed, can produce an excellent 'crescendo of terror', but beware; the final scene could be a terminal experience for many of the Investigators!"

In the January–February 1985 edition of Different Worlds (Issue #38), Steve List liked the book, giving it a solid three stars out of four, and saying, "The material included is quite comprehensive, and written with a wryly imaginative style." He concluded with a strong recommendation, commenting, "In Pursuit To Kadath, TOME has produced an excellent package of material for Cthulhu players and added some interesting lore to the 'things Man was not meant to know.' It is well worth acquiring."
