= Fatal Experiments =

Tabletop horror role-playing game supplement

Three Investigations into the Sinister and Macabre
- Cover by Lee Gibbons
- Designers: Russell Bullman; Gregory W. Detwiler; William Dunn; L.N. Isinwyll; Penelope Love; Kurt Miller; Kevin A. Ross; Richard Watts
- Publishers: Chaosium
- Publication: 1990; 35 years ago
- Genres: Horror
- Systems: Basic Role-Playing

Fatal Experiments, subtitled "Three Investigations into the Sinister and Macabre", is a collection of three adventures published by Chaosium in 1990 for the horror role-playing game Call of Cthulhu, itself based on the works of H.P. Lovecraft.

== Description ==
Fatal Experiments begins with a chapter devoted to obsolete and exotic black powder weapons. The rest of the book is three sequentially-linked adventures set in the 1920s that involve investigation of a lethal research project.

- "Tatterdemalion": An investigation in a theatre that is presenting the obscure and insane play "The King in Yellow".
- "The Songs of Fantari": An investigation on a small isle off the coast of Italy that involves the Deep Ones.
- "The Lurker in the Crypt": The longest adventure in which the Investigators must infiltrate a murderous cult.

There are 5 pages of player handouts, although these pages are not perforated, and must either be cut out or photocopied by the Keeper.

== Publication history ==
Chaosium first released the horror role-playing game Call of Cthulhu in 1981, and regularly refreshed it with new editions containing revamped rules. The fourth edition's release in 1989 sparked a line of superior products that game historian Stu Horvath called "the golden age for the line". One of these products was Fatal Experiments, written by Russell Bullman, Gregory W. Detwiler, William Dunn, L.N. Isinwyll, Penelope Love, Kurt Miller, Kevin A. Ross, and Richard Watts, with cover art by Lee Gibbons, interior art by Earl Geier, and cartography by Carol Triplett-Smith. It was published by Chaosium in 1990 as a 128-page softcover book.

== Reception ==
In Issue 26 of White Wolf (April/May, 1991), Wayne Ligon found the article on black powder weapons "interesting, useful, and well researched." Ligon felt that the first adventure, "Tatterdemalion" would mainly appeal "to Investigators who have theatre backgrounds." Ligon thought the second adventure, "The Songs of Fantari", was more useful as a source of information about the Deep Ones. Ligon called "The Lurker in the Crypt", the much longer third adventure, "a true gem." Ligon did warn that the adventure was potentially very deadly, and recommended that "Secondary characters [to act as replacements if primary characters are killed or go insane] should be cultivated before the Keeper runs this adventure." Ligon concluded by giving this book a rating of 4 out of 5, saying, "This adventure introduces a new Lesser Servitor Race and has quite a few nice rewards for anyone alive and sane enough to collect them."

In the February 1992 edition of Dragon (Issue #178), Rick Swan called this supplement "Another first-class collection of short scenarios for Chaosium's Call of Cthulhu game." He found that all three of the scenarios were "full of surprises and are delightfully disgusting."

== Further recognition ==
A copy of Fatal Experiments is held in the Edwin and Terry Murray Collection of Role-Playing Games at Duke University.
