= Whispers from the Abyss =

Call of Cthulhu adventure

- Cover by Lawrence L. Flournoy
- Designers: Chip Bickley; Ed Wimble; Tom Bailey
- Publishers: Theatre of the Mind Enterprises
- Publication: 1984; 42 years ago
- Genres: Horror
- Systems: Basic Role-Playing

Whispers from the Abyss and Other Tales is a collection of three adventures published by Theatre of the Mind Enterprises (TOME) in 1984 for Chaosium's horror role-playing game Call of Cthulhu, itself based on the works of H.P. Lovecraft.

== Contents ==
Whispers from the Abyss contains three adventure scenarios:

- "On the Wings of Madness" by Chip Bickley: E. A. Wallis Budge (an actual Egyptologist active in the 1920s) has launched the Investigators on a quest for an unknown version of the Egyptian Book of the Dead. The adventure takes place on a trans-continental zeppelin as it flies from Cairo to Munich.
- "De Schip Zonder Schaduw" (The Ghost Ship) by Ed Wimble: During a flight across the Atlantic on a zeppelin, a malfunction causes an emergency landing near a 17th-century Dutch ghost ship. (The gamemaster is advised to split the Investigators into three groups, each with different objectives.).
- "Whispers from the Abyss" by Tom Bailey: An investigation by Miskatonic University scholars that involves the Lost Colony of Roanoke.

== Publication history ==
After publishing the horror role-playing game Call of Cthulhu in 1981 and creating several adventures and supplements for it, Chaosium further expanded the game's universe by licensing other publishers, including Infogrames, Miskatonic River Press, Games Workshop and TOME, which published the three-adventure collection Whispers from the Abyss in 1984 as a 64-page softcover book with cover art by Lawrence Flournoy, and interior art by Peter Beetz, Joe Eagle, Mike Holliday, Elizabeth Liss, Joseph O'Neill, and Patricia Pinkley.

== Reception ==
In Issue 30 of Abyss (Summer 1984), Dave Nalle noted "All three adventures are rather well done, but because of the way they are set up they are a bit rigid and hard to adapt or switch around, though this could have been prevented with a little more development." Despite the high price tag of $10, Nalle concluded, "On the whole this collection in easy to recommend."

In Issue 71 of Space Gamer, William A. Barton commented, "In all three scenarios, TOME shows its commitment to emphasizing background data - especially in De Schip Zonder Schaduw, which includes several lengthy sections of log entries from an actual book called Voyages to the East Indies."

In Issue 85 of Dragon, Ken Rolston was delighted with these adventures, calling them "literate, dramatic, sophisticated." Rolston noted "Historically credible settings with plenty of atmosphere and well-developed narratives are trademarks of TOME supplements, and the interior art is much improved over earlier products." Rolston concluded, "Just very good stuff."
