= In the Shadows (Call of Cthulhu) =

Tabletop horror role-playing game adventure

- Cover art by Eric Vogt, 1995
- Designers: Gary Sumpter
- Publishers: Chaosium
- Publication: 1995; 31 years ago
- Genres: Horror
- Systems: Basic Role-Playing

In the Shadows is an anthology of adventures published by Chaosium in 1995 for the 5th edition of the Lovecraftian horror role-playing game Call of Cthulhu.

== Contents ==
In the Shadows contains three adventures written by Gary Sumpter for the 5th edition of Call of Cthulhu, all set in 1927:

- "Devil's Hole": The investigators attempt to trace the whereabouts of a friend who returned to his ancentral home in Aberdeen, Scotland only two weeks ago and is now missing.
- "In the Shadows of Death": The investigators are summoned to a Louisiana plantation when the new owner has had unsettling visions.
- "The Song of the Spheres": A man in New Haven, Connecticut goes mad after listening to a gramophone recording.

== Publication history ==
Chaosium first published the horror role-playing game Call of Cthulhu in 1981, and released several revisions, including a 5th edition in 1992. Many adventures have been published for Call of Cthulhu, including 1995's In the Shadows, a 56-page softcover book written by Gary Sumpter, with interior illustrations by Dave Carson, Earl Geier, and Drashi Khendup, and cartography and cover art by Eric Vogt.

== Reception ==
Paul Pettengale reviewed In the Shadows for Arcane magazine, rating it a 7 out of 10 overall. Pettengale comments that "These scenarios [...] are worthy of purchase providing you don't mind having your investigators travel between continents (and you don't mind copying out the hand-outs by hand). They prove that Chaosium are still capable of producing fine material, using some fresh approaches, all this time after CoC's original release."

In the November 1996 edition of Dragon (#235), Rick Swan thought that after some very mediocre releases by Chaosium in the early 1990s, In the Shadows was a welcome return to a better quality, "employing the classic archetypes, adversaries, and plot twists that have made Cthulhu so durable." He noted that these adventures were good material for new players, "making In the Shadows a great way to get a new campaign off the ground." Swan's only complaints were that the art style had not changed much in the 15 years since the game was first published; and that the player handouts were scattered throughout the book rather being gathered together in one section, forcing the gamemaster to photocopy mamy more pages. Despite these concerns, Swan concluded by giving the book an above-average rating of 5 out of 6, saying, "Cthulhu-ites can keep their tentacles a-tingling with the essential In the Shadows."

== Other reviews ==
- Backstab, Issue 3 (May/June 1997)

== See also ==
- Coming Full Circle
- The Dreaming Stone
