= Ramsey Campbell's Goatswood and Less Pleasant Places =

Horror role-playing game supplement

- Publishers: Chaosium
- Publication: 2001; 25 years ago
- Genres: Horror
- Systems: Basic Role-Playing

Ramsey Campbell's Goatswood and Less Pleasant Places is a 2001 role-playing game supplement published by Chaosium for Call of Cthulhu.

== Contents ==
Ramsey Campbell's Goatswood and Less Pleasant Places is a supplement in which the Severn Valley and Campbell County are described, along with a series of several adventure scenarios.

== Reviews ==
- Pyramid
- Backstab
- The Black Seal (Issue 1 - Winter 2001/2002)
