= Horror's Heart =

Horror tabletop role-playing game supplement

- Cover art by Eric Vogt, 1996
- Designers: Sheldon Gillett
- Publishers: Chaosium
- Publication: 1996
- Genres: Horror
- Systems: Basic Role-Playing

Horror's Heart is an adventure campaign published by Chaosium in 1996 for the 5th edition of the horror role-playing game Call of Cthulhu.

== Description ==
Horror's Heart is a Call of Cthulhu campaign set in Montreal in 1923 that is divided into six chapters, each of which takes up one day of game time:

- Day 1: The American investigators are travelling to Montreal via train to Montreal at the behest of a mutual friend, Father McBride. During the trip, the investigators have an opportunity to foil the kidnapping of actress Céline Lavoie, who is travelling to Montreal to attend the funeral of her grandfather Lucien. Once in the city, the investigators meet Father McBride, who reveals that during an excavation under the church, a tomb containing a mummified body and a strangely well-preserved heart encased in a reliquary were discovered. The investigators meet Céline for dinner, and become involved in a fight, where they are aided by the sudden appearance of an unnaturally intelligent dog.
- Day 2: The investigators attend the funeral of Céline's grandfather. Afterwards, they are asked to lift a curse Lucien laid on his entire family.
- Day 3: The mummy is stolen, and Father McBride goes missing. The investigators have a chance of lifting the Lavoie curse.
- Days 4 & 5: The investigators discover two ancient and evil rival cults operating in the city.
- Day 6: The investigators must prevent an Elder God from being resurrected.

The book includes five pages of player's handouts, and a separate 22 cm x 60 cm pullout titled "Chaosium's Guide to the Mythos."

== Publication history ==
Horror's Heart is an 80-page softcover book written by Sheldon Gillett, with additional contributions by Lynn Willis and Scott David Aniolowski, interior art by Jason Eckhardt, cartography by Mark Schumann, and cover art by Eric Vogt. Published in 1996 by Chaosium, it conforms to the Basic Role-Playing rules system used by the 5th edition of Call of Cthulhu.

== Reception ==
In the Christmas 1996 edition of Arcane (Issue #14), Steve Faragher criticized the cover art as "tacky", but said the adventure waiting inside was "a shiny little gem," praising the "elegance of thought that has gone into its design [that] leads the players deeper and deeper into an intricate web of competition, paranoia, deceit and deadly evil — in other words, everything you could ever want from a game of Call of Cthulhu." Faragher's only complaint was "that the writing style is a little complex which [...] can make the campaign a bit difficult to get a clear grip on, especially in the early stages. He concluded by giving the adventure an excellent rating of 9 out of 10, saying, "Horror's Heart is a fine example of why Call of Cthulhu remains one of the most popular roleplaying games ever created."

In the October 1997 edition of Dragon (Issue #240), Rick Swan thought that this book showcased "all the elements that make Call of Cthulhu so electrifying." Swan called the plot "compelling", the locales "eerie", and the adversaries "mind-boggling". He also thought the "well-staged encounters" and a "surplus of gamemastering tips" made these scenarios "a snap to run." Swan's only criticism was "the limp finale, disappointing after such a provocative build-up," saying it "prevents Horror’s Heart from achieving classic status." He concluded by giving this adventure an excellent rating of 5 out of 6.

== Other reviews ==
- Rollespilsmagasinet Fønix, Issue 15 (Feb 1997, p60, in Danish)
- Portal, Issue 7 (Oct 2000, p.144, in Polish)
