= Utatti Asfet =

Utatti Asfet is a 1996 role-playing game adventure published by Chaosium for Call of Cthulhu.

== Plot summary ==
Utatti Asfet is an adventure in which a globe-spanning campaign is set amid the Gulf War era with key locations in Tonga, New Orleans, and Sudan. The adventure is packed with maps, NPCs, and situations.

== Publication history ==
Utatti Asfet was written by Owen Guthrie and Toivo Luck.

== Reception ==
Steve Faragher reviewed Utatti Asfet for Arcane magazine, rating it a 7 out of 10 overall, and stated that "I for one look forward to playing more work from these two newcomers to the world of games publishing. This is certainly a very promising start."

== Reviews ==
- Backstab
