= Taint of Madness =

Tabletop horror role-playing game supplement

Insanity and Dread within Asylum Walls
- Cover by Eric Vogt
- Designers: Michael Tice; Shannon Appel; Eric Rowe
- Publishers: Chaosium
- Publication: 1995; 30 years ago
- Genres: Horror
- Systems: Basic Role-Playing
- ISBN: 1-56882-042-9

Taint of Madness is a 1995 role-playing game supplement for Call of Cthulhu published by Chaosium.

== Contents ==
Taint of Madness is a supplement focusing on sanity, which explores asylums and sanatoriums in detail, lists all known forms of insanity and provides their treatments, and details three asylums – Bethlem Royal Hospital for the 1890s, Arkham for the 1920s, and Bellevue Hospital for the 1990s.

== Reception ==
Dean Evans reviewed Taint of Madness for Arcane magazine, rating it a 6 out of 10 overall. Evans comments that "Taint of Madness is an interesting, thought-provoking book and, like most of the Cthulhu add-ons, is crammed with information. But since most referees prefer to side-step the idle months between scenarios, it's not exactly an essential read."
