= No Man's Land (Call of Cthulhu) =

Horror role-playing game adventure

WWI Mythos Action with the Lost Battalion
- Cover art by Tom Sullivan
- Designers: Sam Johnson
- Illustrators: Tom Sullivan; John Murland; Drashi Khendup
- Publishers: Chaosium
- Publication: 1988; 38 years ago
- Genres: Horror
- Systems: Basic Role-Playing
- ISBN: 1-56882-142-5

No Man's Land, subtitled "WWI Mythos Action with the Lost Battalion", is an adventure published by Chaosium in 1998 for the horror role-playing game Call of Cthulhu, itself based on the works of H.P. Lovecraft.

== Plot summary ==
No Man's Land is set in the last year of World War I. Players, using pre-generated characters, take the roles of American soldiers of the Lost Battalion in the Argonne Forest, surrounded by enemy forces and cut off from all aid. In the death-filled atmosphere, the player characters are ordered to find two missing companies. What they don't realized is that they have entered the territory of an alien race and their cultist slaves who plan to use the energies from those who have died in the trenches to complete a ritual to wake an Elder God.

== Reception ==
No Man's Land was reviewed in the online second version of Pyramid, which said "It's no secret I'm a big Call of Cthulhu fan. If you ever wanted to know why, you need go no further than No Man's Land, a new scenario that is a brilliant melding of Cthulhu Mythos horror with the more mundane, human-inflicted kind."

In Issue 12 of the French games magazine Backstab, Geoffrey Picard wrote, "Let's be direct: I loved this supplement. Really loved it. I have a soft spot for war scenarios, especially those based on historical events, and No Man's Land lets you swap your Investigators for American soldiers during the end of World War I ... The supernatural quickly becomes intertwined with this dramatic situation. The game then navigates between delightful genre classics, innovative ideas, and brilliant staging." Picard also noted, "In addition to the scenario, an excellent chapter depicts life in the trenches (routine, communication, disease, gas...) from the U.S. perspective." Picard concluded by giving this adventure a rating of 8 out of 10, saying, "violence will be omnipresent and relentless, in an almost dreamlike way. If your players wonder if all this is real, because it seems so crazy and morbid, you'll have won: a memorable evening! You've been warned!"
