= "Glozel est Authentique!" =

Call of Cthulhu adventure

- Designers: E. S. Erkes; Stephen Rawling
- Publishers: Theatre of the Mind Enterprises
- Publication: 1984; 42 years ago
- Genres: Horror
- Systems: Basic Role-Playing

"Glozel est Authentique!" is a collection of two adventures published by Theatre of the Mind Enterprises (TOME) in 1984 for Chaosium's horror role-playing game Call of Cthulhu, itself based on the works of H.P. Lovecraft, written by E. S. Erkes and C. Rawling, and published by Theatre of the Mind Enterprises.

== Contents ==
The book features two scenarios:

- "Glozel est Authentique!" by E.S. Erkes: The Investigators must travel to a small village in France as part of the international commission tasked with new excavations of the Glozel artifacts. The analysis of its remains, particularly mysterious clay tablets supposedly capable of overturning all known notions of prehistory, could lead to some rather sinister conclusions.
- "Secrets of the Kremlin" by Stephen Rawling: The Investigators are hired to solve the disappearance of a White Russian émigré in Berlin. The investigation will lead the detectives to the heart of Stalinist USSR, to the former residence of the Tsars, now the seat of the Supreme Soviet.

== Publication history ==
After publishing the horror role-playing game Call of Cthulhu in 1981 and creating several adventures and supplements for it, Chaosium further expanded the game's universe by licensing other publishers, including Infogrames, Miskatonic River Press, Games Workshop and TOME, which published the two-adventure collection "Glozel est Authentique!" in 1984 as a 64-page softcover book with art by Keith Feulner, Mike Holliday, and Joseph O'Neill.

On the last page of the book, TOME announced another set of adventures titled The Toy Shop, but it was never published.

== Reception ==
In Issue 30 of Abyss (Summer 1984), Dave Nalle thought the layout and artwork were a cut above previous TOME publications. Nalle concluded, "On the whole, these two adventures are nicely developed and worth looking into if you want to spice up a Call of Cthulhu campaign with something more unusual."

In Issue 59 of White Dwarf, Stephen Kyle commented "some of TOME's previous CoC adventure packs have been notable for their poor layout, terrible artwork and hordes of stereotypical Germans. Well, just for a change, this one has terrible layout, quite good artwork and hordes of stereotypical French and Russians." Kyle concluded by giving this an overall rating of 5 out of 10.

In Issue 71 of Space Gamer, William A. Barton noted "Overall, "Glozel est Authentique!" is probably TOME's best CoC adventure pack to date. If you've liked TOME's past releases, you'll love this one; even if you haven't cared for past adventures, this is one you should take a look at - as a French/Russian sourcebook for CoC play, if nothing else."
