= The Keeper's Companion =

Horror role-playing game supplement

- Publishers: Chaosium
- Publication: 2000; 26 years ago
- Genres: Horror
- Systems: Basic Role-Playing
- ISBN: 1-56882-144-1

The Keeper's Companion is a 2000 role-playing game supplement published by Chaosium for Call of Cthulhu.

== Contents ==
The Keeper's Companion is a supplement in which material is presented to help gamemasters with running games.

== Reviews ==
- Backstab #26
- Envoyer
- Magia i Miecz (Issue 88 - Apr 2001)
- Pyramid
