= Mansions of Madness (Call of Cthulhu) =

Horror role-playing game adventures

- Cover art by Lee Gibbons
- Designers: Fred Behrendt; Shawn DeWolfe; Keith Herber; Wesley Martin; Mark Morrison
- Publishers: Chaosium
- Publication: 1990; 36 years ago
- Genres: Horror
- Systems: Basic Role-Playing

Mansions of Madness is a collection of adventure scenarios published by Chaosium in 1990 for the horror role-playing game Call of Cthulhu, itself based on the works of H.P. Lovecraft.

== Description ==
Mansions of Madness is a collection of five horror occult adventures set in the 1920s, all of them focused on a mansion or other large building:

- "Mr. Corbitt" (by Shawn deWolfe): An innocent-looking neighbor has a disturbing secret hobby of worshiping Things from Beyond.
- "The Plantation" (by Wesley Martin): Set in southern Georgia and involving voodoo.
- "The Crack'd and Crook'd Manse" (by Mark Morrison): An investigation of a deadly mansion.
- "The Sanatorium" (by Keith Herber): The Investigators are trapped on an island with madmen.
- "Mansion of Madness": A three-part adventure that centers on a strange, highly coveted black stone.

All of the adventures comply with the rules for the fourth edition of Call of Cthulhu. There are seven pages of player handouts, although these are not perforated and must be either cut out or photocopied.

== Publication history ==
Chaosium first released the horror role-playing game Call of Cthulhu in 1981, and regularly refreshed it with new editions containing revamped rules. The fourth edition's release in 1989 sparked a line of products that game historian Stu Horvath called "the golden age for the line". One of these products was Mansions of Madness, with adventures written by Fred Behrendt, Shawn DeWolfe, Keith Herber, Wesley Martin, and Mark Morrison, with cover art by Lee Gibbons and interior illustrations by Janet Aulisio and Sam Inabinet. It was published by Chaosium in 1990 as a 128-page book.

Chaosium republished Mansions of Madness in 2007, with a sixth scenario added. In 2021, Chaosium released Mansions of Madness, Volume 1: Behind Closed Doors, which includes two of the original adventures — Mister Corbitt and The Crack'd and Crook'd Mirror — both updated for the latest version of Call of Cthulhu by Lynne Hardy. The book also contains three new scenarios by Lynne Harvey, Christopher Lackey, Gavin Iglis, and Stuart Boon.

== Reception ==
In Issue 26 of White Wolf (April/May 1991), Wayne Ligon thought some of the shorter adventures were useful either to be dropped into a campaign for a single session, or used as a source for background information on cults. However Ligon found "The Crack'd and Crook'd Mansion" to have "good flavor and potentially great play value." Likewise Ligon thought "Mansion of Madness" to be "easily the most complex and interesting adventure in the book. It is quite bizarre and unique, with plot twists and a number of villains working at cross purposes." Ligon concluded by giving the book a rating of 3 out of 5, saying, "Mansions of Madness provides two really interesting adventures, with three others that are 'merely' ordinary, but provide good background info for future games."

In Issue 1 of The Unspeakable Oath, John Tynes thought that of the five scenarios, The Sanatorium was "perhaps the best of the lot, though it is difficult to imagine any group of investigators actually surviving the scenario due to the unusual and overpowering abilities of their opponent. But the tasks presented for the investigators are first-rate, and will give the players a lot of opportunities for creative problem-solving." Tynes warned that The Crack'd and Crook'd Manse "really needs a dedicated and imaginative Keeper, since most of the adventure will consist of keeping the investigators off balance and uncertain of what they are up against." Although Tynes felt the other three scenarios "look promising as well", Tynes felt that in The Plantation "the investigators may not have a lot to do towards the end as events careen out of their control."

== Other recognition ==
A copy of Mansions of Madness is held in the Edwin and Terry Murray Collection of Role-Playing Games at Duke University.
