= Unseen Masters =

Call of Cthulhu adventure

Modern Struggles against Hidden Powers
- Second printing cover by Matt Harpold.
- Designers: Bruce Ballon
- Publishers: Chaosium
- Publication: 2001; 25 years ago
- Genres: Horror
- Systems: Basic Role-Playing

Unseen Masters, Modern Struggles against Hidden Powers is a 2001 Horror fiction tabletop role-playing game adventure, written by Bruce Ballon, with a cover by Matt Harpold, and published by Chaosium for Call of Cthulhu.

== Contents ==
Unseen Masters is a supplement containing three short campaigns intended for use in the modern era: "The Wild Hunt", "The Truth Shall Set You Free", and "Coming of Age".

== Reception ==
The reviewer from the online second volume of Pyramid stated that "In comparison with the classic period of the 1920s, the modern day has seen relatively scant coverage from Chaosium for their venerable RPG, Call of Cthulhu. This is not to belittle their releases for the modern day such as Utatti Asfet, The Stars Are Right, or The Resection of Time, but many feel that none have come close to Pagan Publishing's Delta Green setting and books in terms of tone and feel. Yet now Chaosium have published a contemporary set campaign that can justifiably said to come very close."

Unseen Masters won the Origins Award for Best Role-Playing Game Adventure of 2001.
