= In the Shadows =

In the Shadows or In the Shadow may refer to:

== Films ==
- In the Shadow (2012 film), Czech crime film
- In the Shadows (2001 film), American thriller starring Matthew Modine
- In the Shadows (2010 film), German crime film
- In the Shadows (2017 film), Hindi psychological drama

== Music ==
- In the Shadows (album), 1993 album by Mercyful Fate, and the title track
- "In the Shadows" (song), 2003 song by The Rasmus
- "In the Shadows", a song by Children of Bodom from their 1997 album Something Wild
- "In the Shadows", a song by The Stranglers from their 1978 album Black and White

== Other uses ==
- In the Shadows (Torchwood), audiobook based on the TV series Torchwood
- In the Shadows (Call of Cthulhu), 1995 anthology of adventures for role-playing game Call of Cthulhu
