= Tales of the Miskatonic Valley =

Role-playing game adventure

- Publishers: Chaosium
- Publication: 1991; 35 years ago
- Genres: Horror
- Systems: Basic Role-Playing

Tales of the Miskatonic Valley is a 1991 role-playing adventure for Call of Cthulhu published by Chaosium.

== Plot summary ==
Tales of the Miskatonic Valley is an adventure collection in which six adventures are set within and around isolated towns in Massachusetts.

== Reception ==
Wayne Ligon reviewed Tales of the Miskatonic Valley in White Wolf #34 (Jan./Feb. 1993), rating it a 4 out of 5 and stated that "The latest entry in the 'Lovecraft Country' series gets higher markes than some previous entries for the inclusion of the map, and the use of the area as a setting for horror rather than trying to present the area as horrific in and of itself."

== Reviews ==
- The Unspeakable Oath #5 (Spring, 1992 Digest)
