= Miskatonic U. Graduate Kit =

Tabletop horror role-playing game supplement

Artifacts From the World's Scariest University
- Cover by Gahan Wilson
- Designers: Sandy Petersen; Lynn Willis
- Publishers: Chaosium
- Publication: 1987; 38 years ago
- Genres: Horror
- Systems: Basic Role-Playing
- ISBN: 0-933635-37-0

Miskatonic U. Graduate Kit is an accessory published in 1987 by Chaosium for the horror role-playing game Call of Cthulhu.

== Description ==
Miskatonic U. Graduate Kit is a boxed collection of "memorabilia" from the fictional Miskatonic University of H.P. Lovecraft's Cthulhu-mythos short stories. Designed by Sandy Petersen and Lynn Willis, the kit contains:

- badge blank and two identity cards
- some sheets of Miskatonic University letterhead
- souvenir placemat with maps of the university campuses
- diploma with cardboard frame
- library card
- cafeteria card
- parking decal
- rear window decal
- bumper sticker
- a booklet, "School of Medieval Metaphysics Class Catalog"

== Reception ==
In the August 1987 edition of White Dwarf (Issue #92), Graeme Davis was not impressed with this "accessory", saying "nothing in the kit is the slightest use in the game." Davis also pointed out that the accessories were from the present day, and could not be used in the game, which was set in the 1920s. Davis gave this a thumbs down, saying "it smacks more of Abbott and Costello Meet Nyarlathotep to me."

In the November 1987 issue of Dragon (Issue #127), Ken Rolston noted that none of the components of this boxed set had any in-game application for either player or referee, and that it was "strictly for fans" of the Call of Cthulhu game; but as a self-admitted fan, he admitted "I adore this".

== Awards ==
Miskatonic U. Graduate Kit was awarded the Origins Award for "Best Graphic Presentation of a Roleplaying Game, Adventure, or Supplement of 1987".

== Reviews ==
- Challenge #34
