= Death in Dunwich =

Tabletop Horror role-playing game supplement

- Cover by Lawrence Flournoy
- Designers: Ed Wimble
- Publishers: Theatre of the Mind Enterprises
- Publication: 1983; 43 years ago
- Genres: Horror
- Systems: Basic Role-Playing

Death in Dunwich is an adventure published by Theatre of the Mind Enterprises in 1983 for the horror role-playing game Call of Cthulhu .

== Contents ==
Death in Dunwich, written by Ed Wimble, was Theatre of the Mind's first licensed adventure for Chaosium's Call of Cthulhu role-playing game. The adventure starts out with a murder mystery regarding an art dealer found dead in the town of Dunwich. The book includes

- the adventure
- statistics for pre-generated characters
- player handouts that can be photocopied
- a page of text that was erroneously left out of the book before printing.

== Reception ==
In Issue 26 of Abyss, Dave Nalle called this "a fascinating and innovative scenario ... The art is bad, the mapping and design fairly basic, but the idea and content of this scenario are first rate." However, Nalle noted that "There is a lot of nice, but lengthy background and explication ... to run it really well, you might have to xerox almost all of the text to hand out piece by piece." Nalle also pointed out "if the players don't follow the intended course or get side-tracked too often, they may never get straightened out." Despite this, Nalle concluded, "On the whole though, the way the scenario is presented makes what is a fairly straightforward Call of Cthulhu situation quite intriguing, adding a whole new dimension. Give it a try."

Jon Sutherland reviewed Death in Dunwich for White Dwarf #48, giving it an overall rating of 8 out of 10, and stated that "Death in Dunwich can be interesting, frustrating and terminal and consequently is the better of the two [when compared to Arkham Evil]."

Larry DiTillio reviewed Death in Dunwich for Different Worlds magazine and stated that "Summing up, Death in Dunwich leaves a lot to be desired in terms of a Cthulhu scenario. The two brotherhoods are interesting but not too well-developed. The investigators will not learn much of anything about the Cthulhu mythos [...] and the best thing about it from the stand point is the detailing of Dunwich itself. On the other hand, with a little bit of hole-plugging and expansion, the mystery itself might make a good change of pace scenario in a Cthulhu campaign. My recommendation: think it over before buying and if you do buy it, keep a grain of salt handy for the designer's suggestions."

In the November 1984 edition of Dragon (Issue #91), Ken Rolston thought that Call of Cthulhu lent itself to murder mysteries better than any other role-playing game, but found issue with the organization of this adventure, and noted that no summary or chronology of the adventure is provided for the referee. Rolston also criticized the fact that only bare statistics are given for pre-generated characters, with no background for the players to use. Despite these issues, Rolston called this "an excellent adventure and an example of what good role-playing mystery should be. The theme is imaginative and engaging. The narrative is a sequence of well-developed episodes with many clues and false leads, with important informants who must be discovered and interrogated, and with a wealth of evidence — police reports, newspaper articles, and NPC testimonials — that must be sifted for significance by the players." Rolston praised the macabre elements that "are contrasted nicely against the mundane setting of a rural New England town." He concluded with a strong recommendation, saying, "Though the weaknesses in presentation in Death in Dunwich are unfortunate, they are understandable, given the particular problems of designing, organizing, and presenting role-playing mystery adventures. The mystery itself is detailed, challenging, and dramatic. The horror is satisfactorily evil and gruesome in the style, and the setting, background, and characters are effectively detailed."

Richard Lee reviewed Death in Dunwich for Imagine magazine, and stated that "Unfortunately, there are two major failings. Firstly, DiD is very short. For [the price] you expect more than this single-facet plot. Secondly, the atmosphere is wrong. DiD, one feels, is more influenced by low-budget horror films than by Lovecraft. What use is a Cthulhu supplement where the paranormal is the flaw of the story?! Overall, I'm afraid, the adventure left me cold."

In the March-April 1985 edition of Space Gamer (Issue No. 73), Matthew J. Costello found the price of the book ($8) to be a bit high, but nonetheless gave a thumbs up, saying, "I recommend Death in Dunwich for players with a bit of experience and tact who are ready to concentrate on a murder mystery instead of the Cthulhu mythos. There might be a problem if you feel [the price] is too much for one day of play, but you do get background material as well as the adventure itself."

== Other reviews and commentary ==
- Jeux et Stratégie #33 (as "Meurtre à Dunwich")
