= Keeper's Compendium =

Tabletop horror role-playing game supplement

Blasphemous Knowledge & Forbidden Secrets
- Publishers: Chaosium
- Publication: 1993; 33 years ago
- Genres: Horror
- Systems: Basic Role-Playing

Keeper's Compendium is a 1993 role-playing supplement for Call of Cthulhu published by Chaosium.

== Contents ==
Keeper's Compendium is a supplement in which forbidden knowledge is presented for the gamemaster.

== Reception ==
Wayne Ligon reviewed Keeper's Compendium in White Wolf #48 (Oct., 1994), rating it a 4 out of 5 and stated that "This is one of the best reference works a Keeper can have."

== Reviews ==
- The Unspeakable Oath #11 (Fall, 1994)
- Skt. Georg's Nyhedsbrev (Issue 5 - Nov 1995)
- Casus Belli #84 (as "Manuel Du Gardien")
- Australian Realms #17
