= Ye Booke of Monstres II =

Tabletop horror role-playing game supplement

More Nightmares for Call of Cthulhu
- Cover by Eric Vogt
- Designers: Scott David Aniolowski
- Publishers: Chaosium
- Publication: 1995; 30 years ago
- Genres: Horror Fiction
- Systems: Basic Role-Playing
- ISBN: 1-56882-052-6

Ye Booke of Monstres II, More Nightmares for Call of Cthulhu is a 1995 tabletop role-playing game supplement, written by Scott David Aniolowski, and with a cover by Eric Vogt, for Call of Cthulhu published by Chaosium.

== Contents ==
Ye Booke of Monstres II is a book of monsters, with some new ones and some collected from previous supplements and adventures.

== Reception ==
Steve Faragher reviewed Ye Booke of Monstres II for Arcane magazine, rating it a 3 out of 10 overall. Faragher comments that "This is for Cthulhu completists only, and even he or she will be disappointed to find that they may have already bought half the material."

== Reviews ==
- Dragon #240 (Oct., 1997)
