= Green and Pleasant Land =

Tabletop horror role-playing game supplement

The British 1920s-30s Cthulhu Sourcepack
- Cover by Lee Gibbons
- Designers: Pete Tamlyn
- Publishers: Games Workshop
- Publication: 1987; 38 years ago
- Genres: Horror
- Systems: Basic Role-Playing
- ISBN: 1-869893-06-9

Green and Pleasant Land is a supplement published by Games Workshop and Chaosium in 1987 for the horror role-playing game Call of Cthulhu.

== Contents ==
In an effort to expand the possibilities for Call of Cthulhu campaign settings outside New England, Green and Pleasant Land provides relevant background material about Great Britain as a campaign setting in the 1920s and 1930s.

The content includes:

- new rules for creating British characters, including how military service during World War I will affect a character's sanity
- occult activities in Great Britain in the post-World War I period
- a timeline of important events in Britain during the first three decades of the 20th century
- the cost of common goods, vehicles and weapons
- notable personalities

There are three short adventures included:

- "The Horror in the Glen" (a murder investigation in Scotland)
- "Death in the Post" (investigating an onslaught of threatening letters to prominent people)
- "The Shadow Over Darkbank" (a boating holiday turns to horror inside an old canal tunnel)

There is also a short story, "The Running Man", by Brian Lumley.

== Publication history ==
Green and Pleasant Land is an 80-page book that was compiled by Pete Tamlyn, with contributions by Andy Bradbury, Brian Lumley, Graeme Davis, Richard Cluff Edwards, Chris Elliot, and Marc Gascoigne. It was published simultaneously in the UK by Games Workshop, and in the US by Chaosium in 1987.

== Reception ==
In the March 1987 edition of White Dwarf (Issue #87), Robert Neville was impressed by how much material was included in this book, and thought the writing was good. He did think that most of the information provided could have been discovered through research in a well-stocked library, but admitted that "it's very useful to have it all in one place." He liked the three short adventures, saying, "All three are well-written and imaginative, and will prove to be popular with keepers and investigators alike." He concluded by calling the book "an incredibly useful and important package... no Cthulhu referee can afford to be without this supplement."

In the September 1987 edition of Dragon (Issue #125), Ken Rolston thought the book's contents were "oh, so civilized and oh, so eccentric." He called the background content "Splendid settings and inspirations for unspeakable horrors". He concluded, "Excellent layout, fine illustrations, entertaining, and readable. Don't miss it."
