= The Gateway Bestiary =

Tabletop fantasy role-playing game supplement

- Designers: Sandy Petersen
- Publishers: Chaosium
- Publication: 1980; 45 years ago
- Genres: Fantasy
- Systems: Basic Role-Playing

The Gateway Bestiary is a 1980 role-playing game supplement written by Sandy Petersen for RuneQuest, published by Chaosium.

== Contents ==
The Gateway Bestiary is a supplement of creatures with sections for creatures such as giant insects, legendary creatures, monsters from Celtic legends, creatures from H.P. Lovecraft, and dinosaurs.

== Reception ==
Anders Swenson reviewed The Gateway Bestiary for Different Worlds magazine and stated that "I am not displeased with this book. I have often maintained that there are enough monsters already specified for RQ and that no more could possibly be needed, yet within two weeks of getting this volume, I had already incorporated several of these beasts into my campaign. While I feel that the descriptions are in some cases sparse, they are no worse than many which have been printed in other publications and are certainly superior to those in the original Dungeons & Dragons or the Manual of Aurania."

Steve Jackson reviewed The Gateway Bestiary in The Space Gamer No. 32. Jackson commented that "On the whole, a worthwhile book for RuneQuest players, simply because the complex RQ combat system makes 'monster books' for other games almost useless. If you don't play RQ, you might glance at this one anyway; it covers a few mythological creatures I've never seen 'gamed' before ... and it's much easier to translate from the RQ system than to it."

Andy Slack reviewed The Gateway Bestiary for White Dwarf #22, giving it an overall rating of 6 out of 10, and stated that "While obviously best suited to RuneQuest, the Bestiary could with a little thought have its contents adapted for another game system - D&D would probably be the easiest, though the Fantasy Trip is another good bet."
