= The Asylum & Other Tales =

Tabletop horror role-playing game adventure anthology

- Cover art by Tom Sullivan
- Designers: Randy McCall; Mark Harmon; David Hargrave; Randy McCall; M.B. Willner; John Scott Clegg; Elizabeth Wolcott
- Publishers: Chaosium
- Publication: 1983; 43 years ago
- Genres: Horror
- Systems: Basic Role-Playing
- ISBN: 978-0-933635-04-3

The Asylum & Other Tales is an anthology of seven adventures published by Chaosium in 1983 for the horror role-playing game Call of Cthulhu.

== Plot summary ==
The Asylum & Other Tales is a collection of seven short adventure scenarios for Call of Cthulhu meant to be used by Keepers (gamemasters) when stuck for an idea or to link two larger adventures together:

1. "The Auction" by Randy McCall
2. "The Madman" by Mark Harmon
3. "Black Devil Mountain" by David Hargrave
4. "The Asylum" by Randy McCall
5. "The Mauretania" by M.B. Willner
6. "Gate from the Past" by John Scott Clegg
7. "Westchester House" by Elizabeth Wolcott

A short introduction suggests ways in which each adventure could be used.

== Publication history ==
Shortly after the release of the highly successful Call of Cthulhu role-playing game in 1981, Chaosium published a book of linked adventures, Shadows of Yog-Sothoth, whose story arc formed an entire campaign. In 1983, Chaosium decided to go in a different direction for their second CoC release, planning a commemorative anthology of unlinked short adventures. Greg Stafford invited various author to contribute to the project, and the result was The Asylum & Other Tales, an 80-page book edited by Sandy Petersen, with art direction by Lynn Willis, formatting by Charlie Krank, diagrams by Yurek Chodak, and artwork by Tom Sullivan.

In the 2014 book Designers & Dragons: The '70s, Shannon Appelcline noted the change in direction: "Shadows of Yog-Sothoth set the adventure as the dominant form of Call of Cthulhu supplement. Many more would follow in the years to come. Some of them were linked adventures like Shadows, but others instead featured collections of short adventures, beginning with The Asylum & Other Tales (1983)."

The publication of this book also marked the end of a feud between industry pioneers Greg Stafford and Dave Hargrave. In the mid-1970s, when Stafford had just formed Chaosium, he agreed to publish Hargrave's Arduin role-playing game. However, Hargrave's submission, badly spelled, disorganized and incomplete, proved to be impossible to publish, and Stafford took back his offer. Hargrave accused Stafford of reneging on a promise.

As Appelcline relates, "Stafford managed to bury the hatchet when he asked Hargrave to contribute to The Asylum & Other Tales (1983), the second supplement for Call of Cthulhu (1981). The resulting adventure, 'Black Devil Mountain,' was essentially a dungeon [...] that Stafford thought 'really contrary to the game.' It probably was, but Stafford opted to publish it anyway. Hargrave would later apologize to Stafford for the discord between them and even authored a second 'My Life and Role-Playing' article (1983) as well as one more Call of Cthulhu adventure: 'Dark Carnival' for Curse of the Chthonians (1984). That one was a bit more in tune with Call of Cthulhu's style — though it ended with a dungeon too."

The Asylum & Other Tales was reprinted by Chaosium as part of crowdfunded campaign in 2022.

== Reception ==
In Issue 26 of Abyss, Dave Nalle thought that because the stories were independent of each other, "the quality is not as even as in Shadows of Yog-Sothoth, but this is both bad and good, as some of the scenarios are superior, although some are disappointing." Nalle concluded by finding that this publication was "a bit disappointing, as it was a little too crowded with strange things, partaking of the 'let's search for weird things and read odd books' mentality. Overall I'd say this is a good buy."

In the November 1983 edition of White Dwarf (Issue #47), Jon Sutherland admired the supplement, giving it an excellent overall rating of 9 out of 10, while saying "Asylum is a neat collection providing short interesting adventures. I have always thought that scenarios go on too long and the vitality of the story and the players tail off.... Quality-wise it compares very favourably with Shadows [of Yog-Sothoth]."

William A. Barton reviewed The Asylum & Other Tales for Fantasy Gamer and stated that "In spite of [...] minor flaws, The Asylym & Other Tales is a worthy addition to the Cthulhu Mythos and should be snatched up hand and tentacle by all CoC Keepers."

Anders Swenson reviewed The Asylum for Different Worlds and stated that "Overall, this is a fine collection of Lovecraftian adventures well worth the attention of enthusiastic keepers and completist fans of H.P. Lovecraft."
