= Les Années Folles: Investigations dans la France des Années 20 =

Les Années Folles: Investigations dans la France des Années 20 is a 1988 role-playing game supplement published by Jeux Descartes for Call of Cthulhu.

== Contents ==
Les Années Folles: Investigations dans la France des Années 20 is a supplement in which the setting is 1920s France, blending postwar levity with eerie investigations in the "Crazy Years."

== Reviews ==
- Casus Belli #45
- Jeux & Stratégie #51
