= Ye Booke of Monstres =

Ye Booke of Monstres is a 1994 role-playing game supplement published by Chaosium for Call of Cthulhu.

== Contents ==
Ye Booke of Monstres is a supplement in which a comprehensive bestiary compiles dozens of gods, races, and unique entities, complete with quotes, lore, and usage notes for investigators and Keepers.

== Reviews ==
- Australian Realms #18
- Backstab #1 (as "Le Livre des Monstres")
- Dragon #213
- Roleplayer Independent (Volume 2, Issue 4 - Aug 1994)
