= The Compact Trail of Tsathogghua =

The Compact Trail of Tsathogghua is a 1997 role-playing game adventure published by Chaosium for Call of Cthulhu.

== Plot summary ==
The Compact Trail of Tsathogghua is an adventure in which two linked adventures designed for beginning investigators are presented. The campaign starts with an expedition to Greenland, where players confront both brutal environmental conditions and mysterious, prehuman simian creatures. The second scenario expands on the culture of this race and its connection to the Mythos.

== Publication history ==
The Compact Trail of Tsathoggua was originally released in the mid-1980s as Trail of Tsathogghua and supported by the short scenario "The Haunted House".

== Reception ==
Paul Pettengale reviewed The Compact Trail of Tsathogghua for Arcane magazine, rating it a 7 out of 10 overall, and stated that "I simply can't ignore the fact that the crux of the second scenario is the survival of that one character from the first. The authors should have - and could have - thought of other links to tie the two together. It's a shame that referees will have to do that work themselves."

== Reviews ==
- Ringbote (Issue 13 - Jul/Aug 1997)
