= Terror from the Stars =

Tabletop horror role-playing game supplement

- Cover by Tom Sullivan
- Designers: Scott Aniolowski; Doug Lyons; Andre Stalin; Michael Szymanski
- Publishers: Chaosium
- Publication: 1986; 39 years ago
- Genres: Horror
- Systems: Basic Role-Playing
- ISBN: 0-933635-11-7

Terror from the Stars is a 1986 role-playing game adventure for Call of Cthulhu published by Chaosium.

== Plot summary ==
Terror from the Stars contains two adventure scenarios involving mysterious South American temples connected to the Cthulhu Mythos.

== Reception ==
Phil Frances reviewed Terror from the Stars for White Dwarf #79, and stated that "Terror From The Stars stands up well against other releases of its type (The Asylum, or Curse of the Chthonians for example), and the added advantage of a lower price means you can't really go wrong with this one."

Lisa Cohen reviewed Terror from the Stars in Space Gamer/Fantasy Gamer No. 77. Cohen commented that, "The whole package is ideal, especially with the manual it makes it well worth the price. I would recommend this module to avid Cthulhu players. Remember, when playing the scenarios, have a happy voyage and don't drink the water!"

== Reviews ==
- Casus Belli #39 (Aug 1987) (as "La Terreur Venue des Etoiles")
