= The Bermuda Triangle (Call of Cthulhu) =

Horror role-playing game supplement

- Publishers: Chaosium
- Publication: 1998; 28 years ago
- Genres: Horror
- Systems: Basic Role-Playing

The Bermuda Triangle is a 1998 role-playing game supplement published by Chaosium for Call of Cthulhu.

== Contents ==
The Bermuda Triangle is a supplement in which the Bermuda Triangle is detailed.

== Reviews ==
- Backstab #11
- Pyramid
- Magia i Miecz (Issue 79/80 - Jul/Aug 2000)
