= The Curse (Call of Cthulhu) =

The Curse is a 1990 role-playing game adventure for Call of Cthulhu published by ADP Systems.

== Plot summary ==
The Curse is an adventure in which an eldritch stone tablet is delivered by the postman to a player character.

== Reception ==
Mike Jarvis reviewed The Curse for Games International magazine, and gave it a rating of 7 out of 10, and stated that "if you're not discouraged by the small amount of work that will be needed to fit this into your own game, then this is a fine adventure, which strikes a near perfect balance between investigation and combat."
