= Machinations of the Mi-Go =

Machinations of the Mi-Go is a 1998 role-playing game supplement published by Pagan Publishing for Call of Cthulhu.

== Contents ==
Machinations of the Mi-Go is a supplement in which the Mi-Go are detailed.

== Reviews ==
- Backstab #11
- Pyramid
- Opifex Bi-Monthly: Random Universes (Issue 21 - Sep 1999)
