= The Armstrong Malison =

The Armstrong Malison is a 1990 role-playing game adventure for Call of Cthulhu published by ADP Systems.

== Plot summary ==
The Armstrong Malison is an adventure in which a mysterious stranger turns up late one night and claims to bring a message from an old friend.

== Reception ==
Mike Jarvis reviewed The Armstrong Malison for Games International magazine, and gave it a rating of 7 out of 10, and stated that "if you want an atmosphere laden scenario, you could certainly do far worse than this."
