= The Thing at the Threshold =

The Thing at the Threshold is a 1992 role-playing game adventure published by Chaosium for Call of Cthulhu.

== Plot summary ==
The Thing at the Threshold is an adventure in which a three‑chapter campaign traces the disastrous legacy of an 1890 Pacific expedition as 1920s investigators follow a decade of mounting madness from Arkham to Palestine.

== Reviews ==
- The Unspeakable Oath
- Abyss Quarterly #50 (Winter, 1992)
- The Last Province (Issue 2 - Dec 1992)
