= The Cairo Guidebook =

Horror tabletop role-playing game supplement

- Cover by Charlie Krank and Eric Vogt
- Designers: Marion Anderson
- Publishers: Chaosium
- Publication: 1995; 31 years ago
- Genres: Horror
- Systems: Basic Role-Playing
- ISBN: 1568820259

The Cairo Guidebook is a supplement published by Chaosium in 1995 for the horror role-playing game Call of Cthulhu.

== Description ==
The Cairo Guidebook is a 112-page softcover book designed by Marion Anderson, with interior art by Mark Ryberg, and cover art by Charlie Krank and Eric Vogt.

== Contents ==
The book is a guide to Egypt in the 1920s, and includes

- more than thirty maps
- building plans of temples and other popular tourist sites
- hotels, clubs, and bars
- atmospheric descriptions
- transportation options
- ideas for scenarios

== Reception ==
In the December 1995 edition of Arcane (Issue 1), Steve Faragher liked the book, giving it an above-average rating of 8 out of 10, and saying, "These Call of Cthulhu city guides are a great idea, and this one in particular is full of superb information that's applicable to anyone running a campaign (of any sort) set in the '20s."

In the March 1996 edition of Dragon (Issue 227), Rick Swan admitted that the book "boasts an amazing amount of research", and that the set of maps was "perhaps the best-ever in a Cthulhu product." But he found that the book did not go beyond being a basic guidebook — he was disappointed in the lack of supernatural phenomena ("as scarce as peace and quiet in a daycare center"), the dearth of monsters, and the paucity of story hooks or adventures. Although he concluded "If... you’re hankering to spruce up an Egyptian Call of Cthulhu campaign with some real-life window dressing, you can do worse than the Cairo Guidebook", he gave it a below-average score of only 3 out of 6.

== Reviews ==
- Backstab (Issue 1 - Jan/Feb 1997)
- Rollespilsmagasinet Fønix (Danish) (Issue 10 - October/November 1995)
