= The Dreaming Stone =

Tabletop fantasy role-playing game adventure

Against the Crawling Chaos
- Cover by Jon Snyder.
- Designers: Kevin Ross
- Publishers: Chaosium
- Publication: 1997; 29 years ago
- Genres: Fantasy
- Systems: Basic Role-Playing
- ISBN: 9781568821016

The Dreaming Stone is a fantasy tabletop role-playing adventure, written by Kevin Ross, with art by John T. Snyder, and published by Chaosium in 1997. The fifth published adventure set in H.P. Lovecraft's Dream cycle for Call of Cthulhu.

== Plot summary ==
The Dreaming Stone is a 64-page softcover book designed by Kevin Ross, with illustrations by John T. Snyder, Jason Eckhardt, Drashi Khendup, and Earl Geier. The book contains a complete Call of Cthulhu adventure set in H.P. Lovecraft's Dreamlands. In the adventure, the players' characters find themselves trapped in the Dreamlands, and in order to escape, must seek out a rival and repair the damage he has done to the Dreamlands.

== Reception ==
In the March 1998 edition of Dragon (Issue #245), Allen Varney noted that Chaosium's first four supplements set in the Dreamlands "fail to offer any vision of what to do there." With this fifth Dreamlands adventure, Varney felt Chaosium was finally on the right track, saying, "The Dreaming Stone is more than a pretty good adventure; it's a demonstration of how to adventure in the neglected Dreamlands. The scenario goes wrong in encrusting its dream-fantasy with obsolete random encounters and gratuitous Christian imagery, but it still establishes a characteristically Lovecraftian atmosphere amid gaudy wonders." However, Varney was disappointed in the production values, pointing out "poor layout, skimpy artwork, and lousy proofreading." He concluded that "Though Stone compares well with some other recent Call of Cthulhu products [...] Chaosium’s flagship line needs a graphic overhaul and a visionary line editor to restore the glory days of the 1980s."

== Reviews ==
- Backstab #6

== See also ==
- H.P. Lovecraft's Dreamlands
- S. Petersen's Field Guide to Creatures of the Dreamlands
