= Trail of the Loathsome Slime =

Trail of the Loathsome Slime is a 1985 role-playing game adventure published by Games Workshop for Call of Cthulhu.

== Plot summary ==
Trail of the Loathsome Slime is an adventure in which a modern-day adventure scenario intended for inexperienced player characters centers around the murder of an occult expert, leading to a mystery on a remote island in the South Atlantic, well beyond the Falklands.

== Publication history ==
Trail of the Loathsome Slime was written by Marcus L. Rowland and published by Chaosium/Games Workshop in 1985 as 16-page book.

== Reception ==
Lawrence Schick commented that the adventure "has one of the all-time top scenario titles".

== Reviews ==
- Dagon (Issue 11 - Jan 1986)
