= The Keeper's Companion 2 =

The Keeper's Companion 2 is a 2002 role-playing game supplement published by Chaosium for Call of Cthulhu.

== Contents ==
The Keeper's Companion 2 is a supplement in which a wide‑ranging collection of historical background, Mythos lore, reference lists, weapons data, and creature studies is designed to give gamemasters additional context and more tools for running their games.

== Reviews ==
- Pyramid
- Envoyer
