= Walker in the Wastes =

Walker in the Wastes is a 1994 role-playing game supplement published by Pagan Publishing for Call of Cthulhu.

== Plot summary ==
Walker in the Wastes is an adventure in which the story revolves around Ithaqua, a once-powerful deity of wind, ice, and destruction, whose global cult following has dwindled since his defeat by the Elder Gods. Though diminished, Ithaqua's loyal cultists are determined to restore him to his former glory. Central to their plan is the "Temple of the Winds," a mystical site where the Elder Gods sealed away the bulk of Ithaqua's life essence.

== Publication history ==
Walker in the Wastes was written by John H. Crowe III and published by the small Seattle-based company Pagan Publishing as a book of more than 200 pages, a campaign that was the result of four years of dedicated writing and research and marked Pagan's first major foray into full-length adventures for Call of Cthulhu.

Shannon Appelcline noted that John Tynes had plans to expand Pagan in 1994, and to start with "Tynes said that three publications were immediately forthcoming: an adventure called Walker in the Wastes, another book of The Unspeakable Oath reprints, and a new issue of The Unspeakable Oath itself." Appelcine noted how not everything on the schedule released by Tynes was released as planned: "Other than two issues of The Unspeakable Oath and that book of reprints, Pagan Publishing only managed to publish two supplements over the next year, Walker in the Wastes (1994) and Coming Full Circle (1995) both by John H. Crowe III. The first was a massive Ithaqua campaign, and the second a set of linked scenarios. Both pushed the standard 1920s setting into the 1930s, again showing off Pagan's willingness to take Call of Cthulhu into unusual places."

== Reception ==
Pyramid magazine reviewed Walker in the Wastes and stated that "A massive 200+ page book, Walker is the first major campaign for CoC that Pagan has ever published. Author John Crowe claims that four years of writing and research went into Walker, and it shows. Walker in the Wastes immediately zooms to the top of the list as one of the finest Call of Cthulhu campaigns ever produced."

== Reviews ==
- Shadis #26
- The Familiar (Issue 3 - Apr 1995)
