= Encyclopedia Cthulhiana =

Horror fiction reference work

- First edition cover
- Author: Daniel Harms
- Language: English
- Series: Call of Cthulhu Fiction
- Subject: Horror fiction reference
- Genre: Horror fiction
- Publisher: Chaosium
- Publication date: 1994
- Publication place: United States
- Pages: 400
- Awards: Special Achievement Award, Origins 1995
- ISBN: 978-1568821191

Encyclopedia Cthulhiana is a reference guide to the invented places, beings, and concepts from the Cthulhu Mythos developed by H. P. Lovecraft and others. It was published by Chaosium in 1994.

== Overview ==
Encyclopedia Cthulhiana is a 400-page book by Daniel Harms that contains an alphabetized listing of entities, cults and lore from H.P. Lovecraft's Cthulhu Mythos published during the twentieth century. Other sources include works by Ramsey Campbell, Robert Bloch, and Stephen King, and scenarios from the Call of Cthulhu tabletop role-playing game. There are also suggestions about how this information could be included in a Call of Cthulhu adventure or campaign.

== Publication history ==
An expanded 423-page second edition was published in 1998. A fourth edition was published by Chaosium in 2026.

== Reception ==
In Dragon magazine #218 (June 1995), Rick Swan stated that this book possessed "a diligence on the part of the researchers that borders on the superhuman".

== Awards ==
Encyclopedia Cthulhiana won a Special Achievement Award at the 1995 Origins Awards.

== Reviews ==
- Dragon #252
- Pyramid
