= Lurking Fears =

Lurking Fears is a 1990 role-playing game adventure published by Triad Entertainments for Call of Cthulhu.

== Plot summary ==
Lurking Fears is an adventure in which six 1920s adventure scenarios are presented:

- Rise of the Sleeper: Undead roam the Everglades.
- The Caller in the Desert: A trip to Egypt is interrupted by ancient horrors.
- The Sundial of Amen-Tet: Time travel causes trouble.
- Sorrows' Glen: Exploring an old mine proves dangerous.
- The Starshine: Blood is drunk.
- The Devourer: A new terror appears.

== Publication history ==
Lurking Fears was written by Michael Szymanski and Scott Aniolowski with art by Rodell D. Sanford, Jr., and was published by Triad Entertainments in 1990 as a 160-page book.

== Reception ==
Lawrence Schick called Lurking Fears "A nice scenario package from a new publisher."

== Reviews ==
- The Annotated Unspeakable Oath (Issue 1 - 1993)
- C64 Fun
