= Fragments of Fear: The Second Cthulhu Companion =

Tabletop horror role-playing game supplement

Fragments of Fear
The Second Cthulhu Companion
- Cover by Tom Sullivan
- Designers: Sandy Petersen; Bob Heggie; Lynn Willis; William James Harnblin III, Ph.D.
- Publishers: Chaosium
- Publication: 1985; 40 years ago
- Genres: Horror
- Systems: Basic Role-Playing
- ISBN: 0-933635-23-0

Fragments of Fear: The Second Cthulhu Companion is a 1985 role-playing game supplement for Call of Cthulhu, published by Chaosium.

== Contents ==
Fragments of Fear: The Second Cthulhu Companion is a 48-page supplement which contains a variety of material including the notes of the fictional Dr. Phileus P. Sadowsky, additional deities from the writing of author Ramsey Campbell, adventure scenarios, and more.

== Reception ==
Phil Frances reviewed Fragments of Fear for White Dwarf #75, giving it an overall rating of 7 out of 10, and stated that "Overall, Fragments of Fear disappoints me, especially as it follows in the wake of Masks of Nyarlathotep, the best CoC campaign to date."

Michael Szymanski reviewed Fragments of Fear: The Second Cthulhu Companion for Different Worlds magazine and stated that "The book was well thought out and put together in an orderly manner. Fragments Of Fear displays the brand of quality we've come to expect from Chaosium, and this supplement is a definite step forward for a very unique game."

Guy Hail reviewed Fragments of Fear: The Second Cthulhu Companion in Space Gamer/Fantasy Gamer No. 79. Hail commented that "Chaosium has published a lightly flawed and reasonably priced supplement for the many feverish fans of Call of Cthulhu."
