= A Resection of Time =

A Resection of Time is a 1997 role-playing game adventure published by Chaosium for Call of Cthulhu.

== Plot summary ==
A Resection of Time is an adventure in which Mayan mythology is woven into a contemporary setting where myths are often undermined by scientific explanations. The narrative involves investigators working for a wealthy tech mogul and research institute, traveling from San Francisco to Belize to unravel the mystery of a supposedly dead archaeologist. Evidence begins to unravel the official account, revealing discrepancies in blood tests and a deeper connection to the investigators' own forgotten past. The twist hinges on repressed memories from a 1994 dig, where player characters had unknowingly encountered the Mi-Go—an alien race hidden by a Belizean tribe.

== Reception ==
Paul Pettengale reviewed A Resection of Time for Arcane magazine, rating it an 8 out of 10 overall, and stated that "So, it’s excellent, and Chaosium once again proves that, when it comes to printed adventures, it can knock out the best of them. It's just a shame that in order to involve players who are part of a long-term campaign the referee is going to have to do some serious fudging."

== Reviews ==
- Dragon #245 (March, 1998)
