= The Preacher and the Cross =

The Preacher and the Cross is a 1990 role-playing game adventure for Call of Cthulhu published by ADP Systems.

== Plot summary ==
The Preacher and the Cross is an adventure in which a wealthy woman has been experiencing recurring dreams foretelling the murder of a priest.

== Reception ==
Mike Jarvis reviewed The Preacher and the Cross for Games International magazine, and gave it a rating of 5 out of 10, and stated that "this is a reasonable adventure for more cerebral players, but by no means an essential purchase."
