= Curse of the Chthonians =

Call of Cthulhu adventure

Four Odysseys into Deadly Intrigue
- 2nd edition cover by Tom Sullivan, 2011
- Designers: David Hargrave; Bill Barton; William Hamblin
- Publishers: Chaosium
- Publication: 1st edition, 1984; 2nd edition, 2011
- Genres: Horror
- Systems: Basic Role-Playing
- ISBN: 9781568823485

Curse of the Chthonians is a 1984 role-playing game adventure for Call of Cthulhu published by Chaosium.

== Contents ==
Curse of the Chthonians is a package containing four adventure scenarios, "Dark Carnival" by David Hargrave; "The Curse of Chaugnar Faugn" by Bill Barton; and the linked scenarios, "Thoth's Dagger" and "The City Without a Name" by William Hamblin.

== Reception ==
Stephen Kyle reviewed Curse of the Chthonians for White Dwarf #59, giving it an overall rating of 9 out of 10, and stated that "All of them are very highly recommended as superb examples of how to design thrilling, well-crafted scenarios."

Richard Lee reviewed Curse of the Cthonians for Imagine magazine, and stated that "The presentation of Curse is exemplary. The layout is neat and logical. the artwork relevant, and the texts very well written. Really, there is little to fault, unless it be the potential deadlines of some of the finales. All in all, if one-off scenarios are your thing, Curse is a must."

Aaron Allston reviewed Curse of the Chthonians in The Space Gamer No. 73. Allston commented that "I'd recommend you buy Curse of the Chthonians, in spite of its shortcomings. A good Keeper can make Carnival into quite an event. An afternoon in your local library will make Dagger/City into a colorful, exotic episode. And Curse is a well-rounded, fast-moving scenario with a healthy helping of period flavor. It's a good package."
