= Cthulhu Now =

Tabletop horror role-playing game supplement

Modern Firearms, Forensics, and Occupations, Plus Four Modern Roleplaying Adventures
- Cover by Tom Sullivan.
- Designers: William Barton; Keith Herber; Sandy Petersen; Michael Szymanski; G. W. Thomas, William Workman; Lynn Willis
- Publishers: Chaosium
- Publication: 1987; 39 years ago
- Genres: Horror
- Systems: Basic Role-Playing
- ISBN: 978-0933635470

Cthulhu Now is a supplement published by Chaosium in 1987 for the horror role-playing game Call of Cthulhu.

Cthulhu Now provided information on running Call of Cthulhu in a contemporary setting (reflecting the late 1980s and early 1990s when the supplement was published). Later editions of Call of Cthulhu included support for modern-day settings in the core rulebooks, and much of the supplemental material was incorporated into the game's standard rules.

== Description ==
Cthulhu Now is a 154-page softcover book with two foldouts and 24 pages of perforated removable player handouts that was designed by William Barton, Keith Herber, Sandy Petersen, Michael Szymanski, G. W. Thomas, William Workman, and Lynn Willis, with interior art by Lynell McAdams, and cover art by Tom Sullivan.

The original Call of Cthulhu game was set in the 1920s. This book provides information on running adventures in a modern setting, detailing new investigative skills and equipment, and modern armament — including nuclear weapons. A variant system on hit locations is covered, and there is a chapter on coroners and forensic pathology.

Four full adventures are also included:

- "The City in the Sea", which uses diving gear, mini-subs and an Atlantis-like underwater city
- "Dreams Dark and Deadly"
- "The Killer Out of Space" (involving a space shuttle that crashes in Kansas)
- "The Evil Stars" encompasses death metal rock stars and bikers

Although a second edition was published in 1992, later editions of Call of Cthulhu incorporated support for modern-day settings into the core rules, and no further editions of Cthulhu Now were published.

== Reception ==
In the October 1988 edition of Dragon (#138), Ken Rolston thought the introductory rationale for moving Call of Cthulhu up to the present day was a waste of ink — "We have already accepted the Cthulhu Mythos in spite of its shabby documentary trappings and will continue to accept it for the purposes of gaming because it’s so delightfully lurid and evil" — but he found the rest of the book "is going to make Cthulhu fans happy." He called the information about new equipment and firearms "good stuff" that he "eagerly devoured". He also found the chapter on modern forensics "fascinating reading and a real help to GMs trying to add realistic touches to scenarios." He called the first adventure, The City in the Sea, "a bit heavy-handed and linear", but found the second adventure, Dreams Dark and Deadly, "an excellent example of mystery role-playing in a horror context... As a model of mystery scenario design, and a classic horror/supernatural scenario, this is my pick of the lot." The third adventure, The Killer Out of Space was judged to be "very good", but the open-ended finale of the fourth adventure, The Evil Stars, was "a disappointing weakness, since a detailed development of one of the possible endings could have been a guide and inspiration without railroading both plot and PCs toward a single conclusion." Rolston concluded that "The rules and background essays for contemporary CoC role-playing are interesting and adequate... The adventures are either quite good or very, very good, and the presentation and development of scenario materials, player and GM background, and handout props and clues are up to Chaosium's highest standards."

In the 2014 book Designers & Dragons: The '70s, Shannon Appelcline commented that "After 1984, Chaosium turned away from new Basic Role-Playing System (BRP) games, but they didn't stop creating new settings for their BRP rules. Later years instead brought new venues for their existing games — most notably for Call of Cthulhu, whose publications included: Cthulhu by Gaslight (1986), set in the Victorian Age; H.P. Lovecraft's Dreamlands (1986), set in a fantasy world; and Cthulhu Now (1987), set in the modern day.

== Reviews ==
- The Unspeakable Oath #5 (Spring, 1992 Digest)
- Challenge #34 (1988)
- Casus Belli #44 (April 1988)

== See also ==
- Delta Green
