= William Jones (game designer) =

- Occupations: Game designer and author

William Jones is an American horror fiction writer and editor, and a game designer, primarily of role-playing games.

== Career ==
William Jones is a writer and editor of horror fiction. As a game designer, he has written articles, role-playing game supplements, and role-playing game design for Chaosium and other game publishers.

To date, he has written four novels, numerous short stories, and the short-story anthology, The Strange Cases of Rudolph Pearson: Horriplicating Tales of the Cthulhu Mythos (2008). Although primarily known for horror fiction, he has also written in the genres of mystery, science fiction, dark fiction, historical, and young adult. Jones is also a noted editor of several horror and Cthulhu-mythos fiction anthologies including Horrors Beyond: Tales of Terrifying Realities, and High Seas Cthulhu, and was the editor of Dark Wisdom magazine in 2005 when it was nominated for an International Horror Guild Award in the category of Best Periodical. In 2008, his curated anthology of short stories, Frontier Cthulhu: Ancient Horrors in the New World, was nominated for an Origins Award in the category of Publication, Fiction.

Jones also teaches English at a university in Michigan.

== Reception ==
In her 2009 book The Best Horror of the Year, Volume 1, Ellen Datlow called Jones's anthology of short stories, The Strange Cases of Rudolph Pearson "a clever and entertaining collection of ten interrelated stories of Lovecraftian fiction."

Pamela Kinney said of Jones's novel Pallid Light: The Walking Dead that she needed more background on the protagonist to better understand his motivations, and she also wanted Jones to "Flesh out the story, making it more than the world coming to an end." Despite these points, she rated the book 4 stars out of five, saying, "If you’re looking for a good zombie story to read this winter, this would be the one to get. Just beware: if it’s raining, check for odd lights in the sky. And lock your doors and windows."

== Bibliography ==
=== Novels ===
- Artifacts (2006)
- Pallid Light: The Waking Dead (2010)
- Brass House (2011)
- Voodoo Virus

=== Collections of short stories ===
- The Strange Cases of Rudolph Pearson: Horriplicating Tales of the Cthulhu Mythos (2008)

=== Short stories ===
- A Change of Life (2004)
- A Cyclops Never Forgets (2004)
- Infestation (2004)
- Covenant of Darkness (2005)
- The Name of the Enemy (2005)
- Becalmed (2005)
- Rawhide and Bloodybones (2005)
- Empty Dreams (2005)
- The Tiger (2005)
- Depth of Darkness (2007)
- When the Stars Fell (2007)
- They Who Dwell Below (2007)
- The Treachery of Stone (2010)

=== Anthologies (curating editor) ===
- Horrors Beyond: Tales of Terrifying Realities (2005)
- Horrors Beyond II: Stories of Strange Creations (2007)
- High Seas Cthulhu (2007)
- Frontier Cthulhu: Ancient Horrors in the New World (2007, nominated for Origins Award, Fiction Publication)
- R'lyeh Rising (2008)
- The Anthology of Dark Wisdom: The Best of Dark Fiction (2009)
- Ancient Shadows: Dark Tales of Eldritch Fantasy (2010)
