= Shadows of Yog-Sothoth =

Tabletop horror role-playing game supplement

A Global Campaign to Save Mankind
- Cover art by Tom Sullivan
- Designers: John Carnahan; John Scott Clegg; Ed Gore; Marc Hutchison; Randy McCall; Sandy Petersen; Ted Shelton
- Publishers: Chaosium
- Publication: 1982 1st edition; 2004 2nd edition
- Genres: Horror
- Systems: Basic Role-Playing
- ISBN: 1568821743

Shadows of Yog-Sothoth is a series of adventures published by Chaosium in 1982 for the horror role-playing game Call of Cthulhu.

== Contents ==
Shadows of Yog-Sothoth is a campaign of seven linked sequential adventures that are set in various locations around the globe. Investigators are pitted against the Hermetic Order of the Silver Twilight, which is attempting to raise the lost city of R'lyeh from the depths of the Pacific Ocean. If they are successful, the Elder God Cthulhu will be released from captivity, destroying humanity in the process.

The book also includes two bonus stand-alone adventures:

- "People of the Monolith": Investigators travel to Hungary looking for the author of a disturbing poem.
- "The Warren": Investigators look for a missing associate in the Boston area, and investigate an explosion in an abandoned house.

== Publication history ==
Chaosium first published the role-playing system Call of Cthulhu in 1981. Their first set of adventures for the game was Shadows of Yog-Sothoth, a 72-page softcover book written by John Carnahan, John Scott Clegg, Ed Gore, Marc Hutchison, Randy McCall, Sandy Petersen, and Ted Shelton, with illustrations and cover art by Tom Sullivan.

In 2004, Chaosium published an updated second edition of Shadows of Yog-Sothoth for use with the 6th edition of Call of Cthulhu. In addition to the work by the original authors, new material was supplied by Lynn Willis, and the book was illustrated by Andy Hopp, Charlie Krank, Badger McInnes, Mislet Michel, and Tom Sullivan.

== Reception ==
In the February 1983 edition of The Space Gamer (No. 60), William A. Barton recommended the book, saying, "Shadows of Yog-Sothoth should provide some exciting CoC play for even the most experienced investigators (despite the odd fact that Yog-Sothoth never makes an appearance, title or not), and I recommend it to all Lovecraftians."

Ian Bailey reviewed The Shadows of Yog-Sothoth for White Dwarf #44, giving it an overall rating of 10 out of 10, and stated that "All in all the Shadows of Yog-Sothoth is an excellent and masterly campaign that demands a high standard of play throughout. It is well presented [...] and carefully managed throughout, and it provides, I believe, the most exciting and satisfying adventure available on the market to date. It might seem expensive but it is worth every penny."

In the January 1984 edition of Dragon (Issue 81), Ken Rolston pointed out that "considerable study and preparation by the GM will be necessary... The tactics of the antagonists are not adequately detailed, and will need to be improvised or planned ahead." Rolston thought the first adventure of the seven was the weakest, but found the rest to be of superior quality. He concluded that "The adventures are unusual and the atmosphere exotic and terrifying. Yog-Sothoth is a classic example of role-playing horror, with awesome monsters, desperate victims, and an atmosphere of mystery and menace. Since it provides enough material for a campaign of several months’ duration, it is an excellent value."

Anders Swenson reviewed Shadows of Yog-Sothoth for Different Worlds magazine and stated that "Overall [...] this is an excellent collection of first-rate Call Of Cthulhu scenarios. All keepers (gamemasters) should get Shadows of Yog-Sothoth."

In the June 1990 edition of Dragon (Issue 158), Jim Bambra called Shadows of Yog-Sothoth "good, but it is not as slickly written or plotted as [a later Chaosium publication] Masks of Nyarlathotep"; but he admitted that it contains "excellent scenes" where "horror elements are well presented." Bambra also pointed out that the seven adventures could be de-linked and presented separately: "The individual adventures contain excellent scenes and can easily be run as one-off adventures if the Keeper doesn’t want to link them together. The horror elements are well presented, and the adventures span a wide variety of locations and investigative approaches." He concluded, "Opportunities for role-playing, investigation, and combat abound with nameless horrors and the depraved cultists who worship the creatures of darkness."

In a retrospective review of Shadows of Yog-Sothoth in Black Gate, John ONeill said "Shadows of Yog-Sothoth is an epic, self-contained campaign which first introduced role players to the kind of play demanded by CoC. Players who treated Cthulhu and his minions as simply big D&D monsters, chubby creatures ready to be harvested for their experience point value, were in for a rude awakening."

== Other reviews ==
- Pyramid
