= Cthulhu by Gaslight =

Horror tabletop role-playing game supplement

Horror Roleplaying in 1890s England
- 1st edition cover illustration by Kevin Ramos.
- Designers: William A. Barton
- Publishers: Chaosium
- Publication: 1986 1st edition (Box); 1988 2nd edition; 2012 3rd edition
- Genres: Horror
- Systems: Basic Role-Playing
- ISBN: 978-1568823553

Cthulhu by Gaslight is a horror tabletop role-playing supplement, written by William A. Barton, with art by Kevin Ramos, and first published by Chaosium in 1986. This supplement provides information on role-playing in an alternate setting of Victorian England of the 1890s for Call of Cthulhu. An expanded second edition was published in 1988, and a third edition was published in 2012. It won an Origins Award and received positive reviews in game periodicals including White Dwarf, Casus Belli, Different Worlds, Space Gamer/Fantasy Gamer, The Games Machine, Games International, and Dragon.

== Contents ==
The game Call of Cthulhu was originally set in the 1920s. Cthulhu by Gaslight presents an alternate setting in Victorian England of the 1890s. The supplement includes

- details of life in Victorian England, with essays on social class, occupations, crime, the cost of living, the government, the monarchy, and belief in the occult
- a map of Victorian London
- blank character sheets for the Cthulhu by Gaslight setting.
- The Yorkshire Horror, an adventure featuring interaction with Sherlock Holmes

In order to accommodate players' characters that have already adventured in the 1920s, referees are presented with several ways of transporting those characters to the 1890s.

In 1989, Chaosium republished Cthulhu by Gaslight, adding an essay on world politics of the time, a guide to prominent stores in London, and a glossary of Cockney underworld slang, as well as additional maps of the Tower of London, the British Museum, Westminster Abbey, and Sherlock Holmes's residence at 221B Baker Street.

== Publication history ==
Cthulhu by Gaslight was written by William A. Barton, with art by Kevin Ramos, and was published by Chaosium in 1986 as a boxed set with a 68-page book and a 56-page book, a large map, and a sample character sheet. It was published again in 1988 as a 128-page book.

== Reception ==
Tim Wilson reviewed Cthulhu by Gaslight for White Dwarf #78, and stated that "Overall this is a good buy for anyone wanting an English campaign or as a challenge to those souls jaded by the Arkham countryside, and is recommended to those who appreciate sane game design."

Scott D. Aniolowski reviewed Cthulhu By Gaslight for Different Worlds magazine and stated that "Cthulhu By Gaslight is not a necessity to players of Call Of Cthulhu, and this era seems a bit limited to this writer, however Gaslight does have many useful and entertaining things to offer and adventuring in Victorian London is a nice, fun change of pace from the 1920s. If you are a Sherlock Holmes fan, which the author most certainly is, this is a must for you."

In the August-September 1987 edition of Space Gamer/Fantasy Gamer (No. 79), Lisa Cohen gave the book a thumbs up, saying, "Finally, what I have been waiting for! A game with real mystery and horror all in one."

The Games Machine reviewed Cthulhu by Gaslight and stated that "Thoroughly recommended for anyone who likes the idea of horror roleplaying in the footsteps of Sherlock Holmes. But remember – the tentacles of the Deep Ones are everywhere..."

In the January 1990 edition of Games International (Issue 12), Kevin Jacklin liked the game, but criticized the included scenario "The Yorkshire Horrors", saying, "My gripe with the Gaslight scenario is that it is a long one and players new to Call of Cthulhu or the Victorian era may find it a little daunting." He also pointed out that the scenario, set in Yorkshire, did not use any of the extensive London resources provided by the game. Nevertheless he concluded "I can recommend Gaslight highly, because it is the best produced and clearest background package for Victorian London yet."

In the June 1990 edition of Dragon (Issue 158), Jim Bambra thought that this book "perfectly captures the flavor and mood of the times, taking CoC into a previous age." Bambra also lauded the included adventure, saying, "The Yorkshire Horrors is a good period piece for CoC. It’s lengthy and develops well as the clues pile up, and there are plenty of opportunities for players to exercise their role-playing skills in Victorian society." With only slight reservations about moving characters to a period that has no other adventures written for it, Bambra concluded with a strong recommendation, commenting, "Gaslight is another excellent CoC product... Gaslight comes with my highest recommendation. Anyone interested in adventuring in the Age of Victoria should snap up a copy."

In a retrospective review of Cthulhu by Gaslight in Black Gate, John ONeill said "As much as I enjoyed Chaosium's other published adventures, there was just something about the 1890s England that perfectly suited the creeping horror of the game."

== Awards ==
Cthulhu by Gaslight was awarded the H.G. Wells Award for "Best Roleplaying Supplement of 1986 ".
