= Basic Role-Playing =

Tabletop role-playing game system

Basic Role-Playing (BRP)
- First edition cover
- Designers: Greg Stafford and Lynn Willis
- Publishers: Chaosium
- Publication: 1980, 1982, 2002, 2004, 2008, 2023
- Genres: Universal

Basic Role-Playing (BRP) is a tabletop role-playing game derived from the RuneQuest fantasy role-playing game. Chaosium released the BRP standalone booklet in 1980 in the boxed set release of the second edition of RuneQuest. Greg Stafford and Lynn Willis are credited as the authors. Chaosium used the percentile skill-based system as the basis for most of their games, including Call of Cthulhu, Stormbringer, and Elfquest.

== History ==
The core rules were written by Steve Perrin as part of his game RuneQuest. It was Greg Stafford's idea to simplify the rules (eliminating such mechanics as Strike Ranks and Hit Locations) and issue them in a 16-page booklet called Basic Role-Playing. Since the first BRP release, designers including Sandy Petersen, Lynn Willis, and Steve Henderson have contributed to the system.

The system was notable for being the first role-playing game system to introduce a full skill system to characters regardless of their profession. This was developed in RuneQuest but was also later adopted by the more skill-oriented Call of Cthulhu RPG.

BRP was conceived of as a generic system. Specific rule systems for support differing genres could be added to the core rules in a modular fashion. In order to underscore this, in 1982 Chaosium released the Worlds of Wonder box set, which contained a revised main booklet and several booklets providing the additional rules for playing in specific genres. The superhero-themed Superworld originated as part of this set. A third edition of the core booklet, now entitled Basic Roleplaying: The Chaosium System, was released in 2002.

In 2004, Chaosium began publishing the Basic Roleplaying monographs, a series of paperback booklets. The first four monographs (Players Book, Magic Book, Creatures Book, and Gamemaster Book) was the same as RuneQuest third Edition, but with trademarked elements removed, as Chaosium had lost the rights to the name but retained copyright to the rules text. Additional monographs allowing for new mechanics, thereby extending the system to other genres, were released in the following years. Many of these monographs reproduced rules from other Chaosium-published BRP games that had gone out of print.

Jason Durall and Sam Johnson gathered up previous works and updated them to a new edition. published in 2008. This comprehensive book, Basic Roleplaying: The Chaosium System was nicknamed the "Big Gold Book". It allowed game masters to build their own game out of the included subsystems. A quickstart booklet for new players accompanied it. In 2011, it was updated to a second edition.

In 2020, Chaosium released Basic Roleplaying in abbreviated form (vs. the 2008 edition) as a System Reference Document (SRD).

A new edition, updating the 2008/2011 editions and titled Basic Roleplaying: Universal Game Engine, appeared in 2023, initially as a PDF, later as a hardbound book, and later still as a standalone SRD under the "ORC License" (Open RPG Creative) and has since spun off a market of multiple commercial products, both standalone BRP adventures and full-fledged RPGs, published under the terms of the ORC license. The full text (not the art, trade dress, etc.) of the PDF and print version was also ORC-licensed as a SRD.

== Licensed adaptations ==
Preexisting RPG and fiction settings converted to the system by Chaosium using the BRP ruleset include Ringworld, Hawkmoon, and an adaptation of the French RPG Nephilim.

== Rules system ==
BRP is similar to other generic systems such as GURPS, Hero System, or Savage Worlds in that it uses a simple resolution method which can be broadly applied. It uses a core set of seven characteristics: Size, Strength, Dexterity, Constitution, Intelligence, Power, and Appearance or Charisma. From these, a character derives scores in various skills, expressed as percentages. These skill scores are the basis of play. When attempting an action, the player rolls percentile dice to attempt to get a result equal to or lower than the character's skill score. Each incarnation of the BRP rules changed or added to the core ideas and mechanics, so that games are not identical. For example, in Call of Cthulhu, skills may never be over 100%, while in Stormbringer skills in excess of 100% are within reach for all characters. Scores can increase through experience checks, the mechanics of which vary in an individual game.

The system treats armor and defense as separate: the act of parrying is a defensive skill that reduces an opponent's chance to successfully land an attack, and the purpose of armor is to absorb damage.

In most BRP games there is no difference between the player character race systems and that of monsters or other opponents. By varying ability scores, the same system is used for a human hero as a troll villain. This approach allows for players to play a variety of nonhuman species.

== Adaptations of the system ==
Chaosium was an early adopter of licensing out its BRP system to other companies, something that was unique at the time they began but commonplace now thanks to the d20 licenses. This places BRP in the notable position of being one of the first products to allow other game companies to develop games or game aids for their work. For example, Other Suns, published by Fantasy Games Unlimited, used them under license. BRP was also used as the base for the Swedish game Drakar och Demoner from Target Games.

== Reception ==
In the July 1981 edition of The Space Gamer (Issue No. 41), Ronald Pehr commented that "Basic Role-Playing is too little too late. RuneQuest is long established, does an adequate job of teaching role-playing, and there are now even more games to choose from. If you want to teach role-playing to a very young, but literate, child, Basic Role-Playing is excellent. Otherwise, for all its charm, it's not much use.".

In the August 1981 edition of Dragon (Issue 52), John Sapienza noted that Basic Roleplaying was "not a fantasy role-playing game as such, but a handbook on how to role-play and a simple combat system to help the beginner get into the act." Despite this, Sapienza called it "one of the best introductions to the practical social interactions in gaming that I have read, and will give beginning gamers the kind of guidance they typically do not get in the full-scale games they will graduate to, since game writers usually spend their time on mechanics instead of on the proper relationships between player and player, player and referee, or player and character." He concluded, "Basic Role-Playing is a truly universal introduction to the hobby — highly recommended."

=== Awards ===
The BRP itself has been the recipient, via its games, of many awards. Most notable was the 1981 Origins Award for Best Roleplaying Rules of 1981 for Call of Cthulhu. Other editions of Call of Cthulhu have also won Origins Awards including the Hall of Fame award. The BRP Character Generation software has also won awards for its design.
