= Call of Cthulhu (role-playing game) =

Tabletop horror role-playing game

Horror Roleplaying in the Worlds of H.P. Lovecraft
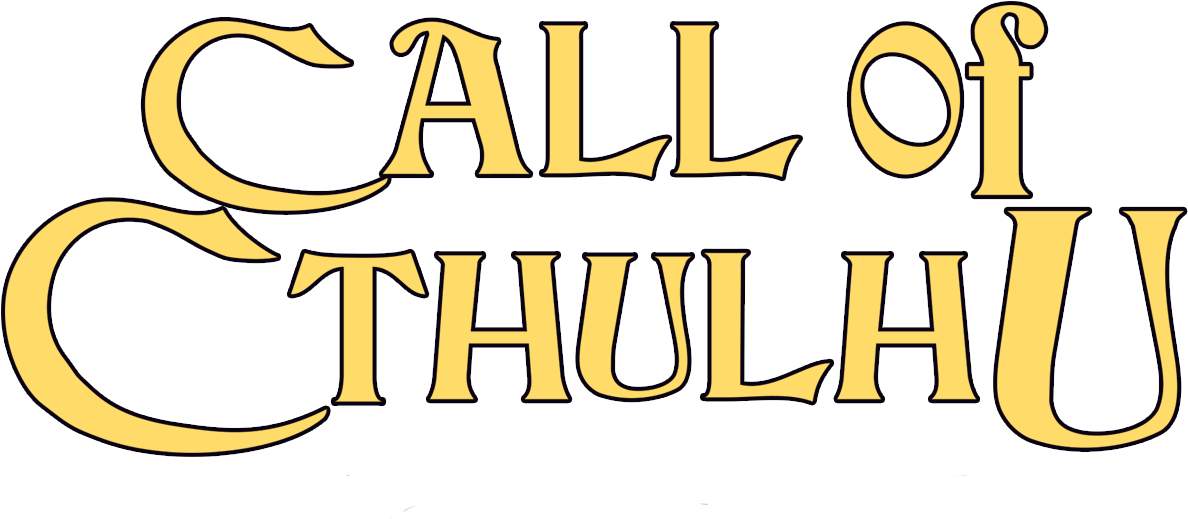
- The Call of Cthulhu Logo

- 1st edition box cover by Gene Day, 1981
- Designers: Sandy Petersen
- Publishers: Chaosium
- Publication: 1981; 45 years ago
- Genres: Cosmic horror Mystery fiction
- Systems: Basic Role-Playing (adaptations into other systems also available)
- Website: www.chaosium.com/call-of-cthulhu-rpg
- ISBN: 978-1568824307

7th edition cover by Sam Lamont, 2014

Call of Cthulhu is a horror fiction role-playing game based on H. P. Lovecraft's story of the same name and the associated Cthulhu Mythos. The game, often abbreviated as CoC, is published by Chaosium and was originally created by Sandy Petersen; it was first released in 1981 and is in its seventh edition, with licensed foreign language editions available as well. Its game system is based on Chaosium's Basic Role-Playing (BRP) with additions for the horror genre. These include special rules for sanity and luck. It is one of the longest-running tabletop role-playing games still in publication.

In Call of Cthulhu, players control ordinary people: investigators, typically in the game's default historical 1920s setting, seeking to solve and uncover paranormal mysteries, usually linked to the Cthulhu Mythos, and survive its deadly creatures and forces that are harmful to their lives and the human psyche. At its release in 1981, the game was notable for its emphasis on psychological horror, investigation, and character vulnerability rather than combat and heroic adventures, departing from the conventions of many contemporary role-playing games. Widely regarded as a pioneering horror role-playing game, it influenced numerous later games and helped establish horror as a major tabletop RPG genre.

Call of Cthulhu has also been adapted for video, card and board games using the setting and the Call of Cthulhu brand. Some include Call of Cthulhu: The Card Game, the board game Arkham Horror, and video games Call of Cthulhu: Dark Corners of the Earth, Call of Cthulhu: The Wasted Land and Call of Cthulhu (2018).

== Gameplay ==
=== Setting ===
Call of Cthulhu is set in a darker version of our world based on H. P. Lovecraft's observation (from his essay, "Supernatural Horror in Literature") that "The oldest and strongest emotion of mankind is fear, and the oldest and strongest kind of fear is fear of the unknown." The original edition, first published in 1981, uses Basic Role-Playing as its basis and is set in the 1920s, the setting of many of Lovecraft's stories. Many supplements expanded the game's setting beyond the original 1920s to different historical periods and otherworldly locales. The Cthulhu by Gaslight supplement blends the occult and Holmesian mystery and is mostly set in England during the 1890s. Cthulhu Now and Delta Green are set in a modern/1980s era and deal with conspiracies. Recent settings include 1000 AD (Cthulhu: Dark Ages), the 23rd century (Cthulhu Rising) and Ancient Rome (Cthulhu Invictus). The protagonists may also travel to places that are not of this earth, such as the Dreamlands (which can be accessed through dreams as well as being physically connected to the earth), Carcosa, other planets, or the voids of space. In keeping with the Lovecraftian theme, the gamemaster is called the Keeper of Arcane Lore ("the keeper"), while player characters are called Investigators of the Unknown ("investigators").

While predominantly focused on Lovecraftian fiction and horror, playing in the Cthulhu Mythos is not required. The system also includes ideas for non-Lovecraft games, such as using folk horror or the settings of other authors and horror movies, or with entirely custom settings and creatures by the gamemaster and/or players.

=== Mechanics ===
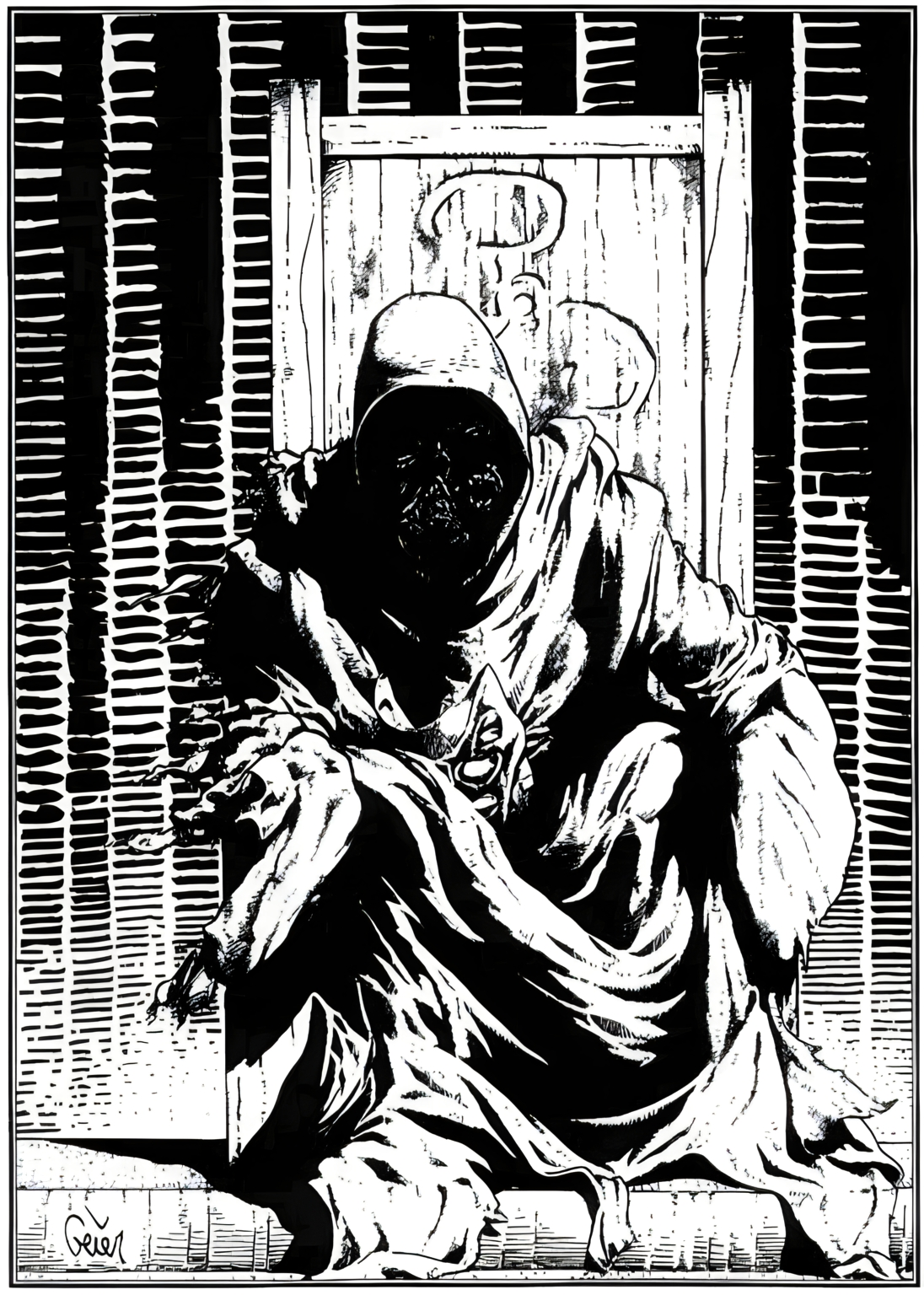
"The King in Yellow", illustration by Earl Geier for the Fatal Experiments adventure book. The Yellow Sign adorning the back of the throne was designed by Kevin A. Ross for the Call of Cthulhu scenario Tell Me, Have You Seen the Yellow Sign?

CoC uses the Basic Role-Playing system first developed for RuneQuest and used in other Chaosium games. It is skill-based, with player characters getting better with their skills by succeeding at using them for as long as they stay functionally healthy and sane. They do not, however, gain hit points and do not become significantly harder to kill. The game does not use levels.

CoC uses percentile dice (with results ranging from 1 to 100) to determine success or failure. Every player statistic is intended to be compatible with the notion that there is a probability of success for a particular action given what the player is capable of doing. For example, an artist may have a 75% chance of being able to draw something (represented by having 75 in Art skill), and thus rolling a number under 75 would yield a success. Rolling 1/5 or less of the skill level (1–15 in the example) would be a "special success" (or an "impale" for combat skills) and would yield some extra bonus to be determined by the keeper. For example, the artist character might draw especially well or especially fast, or catch some unapparent detail in the drawing.

The players take the roles of ordinary people drawn into the realm of the mysterious: detectives, criminals, scholars, artists, war veterans, etc. Often, happenings begin innocently enough, until more and more of the workings behind the scenes are revealed. As the characters learn more of the true horrors of the world and the irrelevance of humanity, their sanity (represented by "Sanity Points", abbreviated SAN) inevitably withers away. The game includes a mechanism for determining how damaged a character's sanity is at any given point; encountering the horrific beings usually triggers a loss of SAN points. To gain the tools they need to defeat the horrors – mystic knowledge and magic – the characters may end up losing some of their sanity, though other means such as pure firepower or simply outsmarting one's opponents also exist. CoC has a reputation as a game in which it is quite common for a player character to die in gruesome circumstances or end up in a mental institution. Eventual triumph of the players is not guaranteed.

== History ==
The original conception of Call of Cthulhu was Dark Worlds, a game commissioned by the publisher Chaosium but never published. Sandy Petersen contacted them regarding writing a supplement for their popular fantasy game RuneQuest set in Lovecraft's Dreamlands. He took over the writing of Call of Cthulhu, and the game was released in 1981. Petersen oversaw the first four editions with only minor changes to the system. Once he left, development was continued by Lynn Willis, who was credited as co-author in the fifth and sixth editions. After the death of Willis, Mike Mason became Call of Cthulhu line editor in 2013, continuing its development with Paul Fricker. Together they made the most significant rules alterations, more so than in any previous edition, culminating in the release of the 7th edition in 2014.

=== Editions ===
Edition	Published	Format	Notes
1st edition	1981	Boxed set	Includes the 16-page Basic Role-Playing booklet in addition to the main rulebook.
2nd edition	1983	Boxed set	Includes a single rulebook; minor rules changes (summarized in 619 words in the Cthulhu Companion).
3rd edition	1986	Boxed set	Divided the rules into a separate Investigator's Book and a Keeper's Book booklets.
4th edition	1989	Softcover	Includes content from the Cthulhu Companion and Fragments of Fear: The Second Cthulhu Companion supplements.
5th edition	1992	Softcover	The first version to credit Lynn Willis as co-author.
Edition 5.5	1998	Softcover	Reorganized and updated version of the 5th edition, with new cover art; the "Edition 5.5" designator appears on the title page.
Edition 5.6	1999	Hardcover	Corrected revised printing; the "Edition 5.6" designator appears on the title page.
Edition 5.6.1	2001	Hardcover	Corrected revised printing; the "Edition 5.6.1" designator appears on the title page.
20th Anniversary Edition	2001	Leather-bound hardcover book	Limited edition bound in green leather, with new "ancient tome" layout.
6th edition	2004	Hardcover, softcover, or PDF	Same layout and content as the 20th Anniversary Edition.
7th edition	2014	Hardcover, softcover, or PDF	The rules were significantly revised by Paul Fricker and Mike Mason. New cover art and a full-color layout. The print version was released in spring 2016.

=== Early releases ===
For those grounded in the RPG tradition, the very first release of Call of Cthulhu created a brand new framework for table-top gaming. Rather than the traditional format established by Dungeons & Dragons, which often involved the characters wandering through caves or tunnels and fighting different types of monsters, Sandy Petersen introduced the concept of the Onion Skin: Interlocking layers of information and nested clues that lead the player characters from seemingly minor investigations into a missing person to discovering mind-numbingly awful, global conspiracies to destroy the world. Unlike its predecessor games, CoC assumed that most investigators would not survive, alive or sane, and that the only safe way to deal with the vast majority of nasty things described in the rule books was to run away. A well-run CoC campaign should engender a sense of foreboding and inevitable doom in its players. The style and setting of the game, in a relatively modern time period, created an emphasis on real-life settings, character research, and thinking one's way around trouble.

The first book of Call of Cthulhu adventures was Shadows of Yog-Sothoth. In this work, the characters come upon a secret society's foul plot to destroy mankind, and pursue it first near to home and then in a series of exotic locations. This template was to be followed in many subsequent campaigns, including Fungi from Yuggoth (later known as Curse of Cthulhu and Day of the Beast), Spawn of Azathoth, and possibly the most highly acclaimed, Masks of Nyarlathotep.

Shadows of Yog-Sothoth is important not only because it represents the first published addition to the boxed first edition of Call of Cthulhu, but because its format defined a new way of approaching a campaign of linked RPG scenarios involving actual clues for the would-be detectives amongst the players to follow and link in order to uncover the dastardly plots afoot. Its format has been used by every other campaign-length Call of Cthulhu publication. The standard of CoC scenarios was well received by independent reviewers. The Asylum and Other Tales, a series of stand alone articles released in 1983, rated an overall 9/10 in Issue 47 of White Dwarf magazine.

The standard of the included 'clue' material varies from scenario to scenario, but reached its zenith in the original boxed versions of the Masks of Nyarlathotep and Horror on the Orient Express campaigns. Inside these one could find matchbooks and business cards apparently defaced by non-player characters, newspaper cuttings and (in the case of Orient Express) period passports to which players could attach their photographs, increasing the sense of immersion. Indeed, during the period that these supplements were produced, third party campaign publishers strove to emulate the quality of the additional materials, often offering separately-priced 'deluxe' clue packages for their campaigns.

Additional milieux were provided by Chaosium with the release of Dreamlands, a boxed supplement containing additional rules needed for playing within the Lovecraft Dreamlands, a large map and a scenario booklet, and Cthulhu By Gaslight, another boxed set which moved the action from the 1920s to the 1890s.

=== Cthulhu Now ===
In 1987, Chaosium issued the supplement titled Cthulhu Now, a collection of rules, supplemental source materials and scenarios for playing Call of Cthulhu in the present day. This proved to be a very popular alternative milieu, so much so that much of the supplemental material is now included in the core rule book.

=== Lovecraft Country ===
Lovecraft Country was a line of supplements for Call of Cthulhu released in 1990. These supplements were overseen by Keith Herber and provided backgrounds and adventures set in Lovecraft's fictional towns of Arkham, Kingsport, Innsmouth, Dunwich, and their environs. The intent was to give investigators a common base, as well as to center the action on well-drawn characters with clear motivations.

=== Terror Australis ===
In 1987, Terror Australis: Call of Cthulhu in the Land Down Under was published. In 2018, a revised and updated version of the 1987 game was reissued, with about triple the content and two new games. It requires the Call of Cthulhu Keeper's Rulebook (7th Edition) and is usable with Pulp Cthulhu.

=== Pulp Cthulhu ===
In 2016, Chaosium published Pulp Cthulhu, a supplement for the 7th edition of Call of Cthulhu. Inspired by the pulp adventure fiction of the 1930s, it introduces rules for more resilient and capable investigators, emphasizing cinematic action, heroic exploits, and globe-spanning adventures while retaining the cosmic horror of the Cthulhu Mythos.

=== Harlem Unbound ===
In 2020, Chaosium released the 2nd edition of Harlem Unbound, a Call of Cthulhu supplement set in the Harlem Renaissance. Harlem Unbound received three Gold ENNIE Awards and an Indie Game Developer Network award.

=== Recent history ===
In the years after the collapse of the Mythos collectible card game (production ceased in 1997), the release of CoC books was very sporadic, with up to a year between releases. Chaosium struggled with near bankruptcy for many years before finally starting their upward climb again.

2005 was Chaosium's busiest year for many years, with 10 releases for the game. Chaosium took to marketing "monographs"—short books by individual writers with editing and layout provided out-of-house—directly to the consumer, allowing the company to gauge market response to possible new works. The range of times and places in which the horrors of the Mythos can be encountered was also expanded in late 2005 onward with the addition of Cthulhu Dark Ages by Stéphane Gesbert, which gives a framework for playing games set in 11th century Europe, Secrets of Japan by Michael Dziesinski for gaming in modern-day Japan, and Secrets of Kenya by David Conyers for gaming in interwar period Africa.

In July 2011, Chaosium announced it would re-release a 30th anniversary edition of the CoC 6th edition role-playing game. This 320-page book features thick (3 mm) leatherette hardcovers with the front cover and spine stamped with gold foil. The interior pages are printed in black ink, on 90 gsm matte art paper. The binding is thread sewn, square backed. Chaosium offered a one-time printing of this Collector's Edition.

On May 28, 2013, a crowdfunding campaign on Kickstarter for the 7th edition of Call of Cthulhu was launched with a goal of $40,000; it ended on June 29 of the same year having collected $561,836. It included many more major revisions than any previous edition, and also split the core rules into two books, a Player's Guide and Keeper's Guide. Problems and delays fulfilling the Kickstarters for the 7th edition of Call of Cthulhu led Greg Stafford and Sandy Petersen (who had both left in 1998) to return to an active role at Chaosium in June 2015. The print version of 7th edition became available in September 2016.

The available milieux were also expanded with the release of Cthulhu Through the Ages, a supplement containing additional rules needed for playing within the Roman Empire, Mythic Iceland, a futuristic micro-setting, and the End Times, where the monsters of the mythos attempt to subjugate or destroy the world.

== Licenses ==
Chaosium has licensed other publishers to create supplements, video, card and board games using the setting and the Call of Cthulhu brand. Many, such as Delta Green by Pagan Publishing and Arkham Horror by Fantasy Flight, have moved away completely from Call of Cthulhu. Other licensees have included Infogrames, Miskatonic River Press, Theater of the Mind Enterprises, Triad Entertainment, Games Workshop, RAFM, Goodman Games, Grenadier Models Inc. and Yog-Sothoth.com. These supplements may be set in different time frames or even different game universes from the original game.

=== Trail of Cthulhu ===
In February 2008, Pelgrane Press published Trail of Cthulhu, a stand-alone game created by Kenneth Hite using the GUMSHOE System developed by Robin Laws. GUMSHOE is specifically designed to be used in investigative games.

=== Shadows of Cthulhu ===
In September 2008, Reality Deviant Publications published Shadows of Cthulhu, a supplement that brings Lovecraftian gaming to Green Ronin's True20 system.

=== Realms of Cthulhu ===
In October 2009, Reality Blurs published Realms of Cthulhu, a supplement for Pinnacle Entertainment's Savage Worlds system.

=== Delta Green ===
Pagan Publishing published Delta Green, a series of supplements originally set in the 1990s, although later supplements add support for playing closer to the present day. In these, player characters are agents of a secret agency known as Delta Green, which fights against creatures from the Mythos and conspiracies related to them. Arc Dream Publishing released a new version of Delta Green in 2016 as a standalone game, partially using the mechanics from Call of Cthulhu.

=== d20 Call of Cthulhu ===
In 2001, a stand-alone version of Call of Cthulhu was released by Wizards of the Coast, for the d20 system. Intended to preserve the feeling of the original game, the d20 conversion of the game rules were supposed to make the game more accessible to the large D&D player base. The d20 system also made it possible to use Dungeons & Dragons characters in Call of Cthulhu, as well as to introduce the Cthulhu Mythos into Dungeons & Dragons games. The d20 version of the game is no longer supported by Wizards as per their contract with Chaosium. Chaosium included d20 stats as an appendix in three releases (see Lovecraft Country), but have since dropped the "dual stat" idea.

=== Achtung! Cthulhu ===
In 2013, Modiphius Entertainment published Achtung! Cthulhu, a World War II-themed setting for Call of Cthulhu. The setting features a secret war in which Allied forces battle Nazi occult organizations attempting to harness Cthulhu Mythos entities and supernatural powers. The setting has also been ported to other systems, such as Savage Worlds and the Fate system. In 2020 Modiphius released Achtung! Cthulhu 2d20, a standalone role-playing game using the company's own proprietary 2d20 System.

=== Cthulhu Britannica and World War Cthulhu ===
In 2009, Cubicle 7 Entertainment published Cthulhu Britannica, a series of supplements for Call of Cthulhu set in the United Kingdom. The line explored the folklore, history, and legends of the British Isles through sourcebooks, adventures, and campaigns. In 2013, Cubicle 7 expanded its licensed Call of Cthulhu offerings with World War Cthulhu, a series of supplements set during the Second World War and the Cold War that focused on espionage and covert operations against Cthulhu Mythos threats. Both product lines remained in publication until 2017, when Cubicle 7's Call of Cthulhu license ended. In 2021, Chaosium acquired the Cthulhu Britannica and World War Cthulhu lines for future republication.

=== Card games ===
Mythos was a collectible card game (CCG) based on the Cthulhu Mythos that Chaosium produced and marketed during the mid-1990s. While generally praised for its fast gameplay and unique mechanics, it ultimately failed to gain a very large market presence. It bears mention because its eventual failure brought the company to hard times that affected its ability to produce material for Call of Cthulhu. Call of Cthulhu: The Card Game is a second collectible card game, produced by Fantasy Flight Games.

=== Miniatures ===
The first licensed Call of Cthulhu 25-millimetre (1.0-inch) gaming miniatures were sculpted by Andrew Chernack and released by Grenadier Models in boxed sets and blister packs in 1983. The license was later transferred to RAFM. As of 2011, RAFM still produce licensed Call of Cthulhu models sculpted by Bob Murch. Both lines include investigator player character models and the iconic monsters of the Cthulhu mythos.

As of July 2015, Reaper Miniatures started its third "Bones Kickstarter", a Kickstarter intended to help the company migrate some miniatures from metal to plastic, and introducing some new ones. Among the stretch goals was the second $50 expansion, devoted to the Mythos, with miniatures such as Cultists, Deep Ones, Mi'Go, and an extra $15 Shub-Niggurath "miniature" (it is, at least, 6x4 squares). It is expected for those miniatures to remain in the Reaper Miniatures catalogue after the Kickstarter project finishes. In 2020 Chaosium announced a license agreement with Ardacious for Call of Cthulhu virtual miniatures to be released on their augmented reality app Ardent Roleplay.

=== Video games ===
==== Shadow of the Comet ====
Shadow of the Comet (later repackaged as Call of Cthulhu: Shadow of the Comet) is an adventure game developed and released by Infogrames in 1993. The game is based on H. P. Lovecraft's Cthulhu Mythos and uses many elements from Lovecraft's The Dunwich Horror and The Shadow Over Innsmouth. A follow-up game, Prisoner of Ice, is not a direct sequel.

==== Prisoner of Ice ====
Prisoner of Ice (also Call of Cthulhu: Prisoner of Ice) is an adventure game developed and released by Infogrames for the PC and Macintosh computers in 1995 in America and Europe. It is based on H. P. Lovecraft's Cthulhu Mythos, particularly At the Mountains of Madness, and is a follow-up to Infogrames' earlier Shadow of the Comet. In 1997, the game was ported to the Sega Saturn and PlayStation exclusively in Japan.

==== Dark Corners of the Earth ====
A licensed first-person shooter adventure game by Headfirst Productions, based on Call of Cthulhu campaign Escape from Innsmouth and released by Bethesda Softworks in 2005/2006 for the PC and Xbox.

==== The Wasted Land ====
In April 2011, Chaosium and new developer Red Wasp Design announced a joint project to produce a mobile video game based on the Call of Cthulhu RPG, entitled Call of Cthulhu: The Wasted Land. The game was released on January 30, 2012.

==== Cthulhu Chronicles ====
In 2018, Metarcade produced Cthulhu Chronicles, a game for iOS with a campaign of nine mobile interactive fiction stories set in 1920s England based on Call of Cthulhu. The first five stories were released on July 10, 2018.

==== Call of Cthulhu ====
Call of Cthulhu is a survival horror role-playing video game developed by Cyanide and published by Focus Home Interactive for PlayStation 4, Xbox One and Windows. The game features a semi-open world environment and incorporates themes of Lovecraftian and psychological horror into a story which includes elements of investigation and stealth. It is inspired by H. P. Lovecraft's short story "The Call of Cthulhu".

== Reception ==
Steve Peterson reviewed Call of Cthulhu for Different Worlds magazine and stated that "Call of Cthulhu is an excellent game, well worth your money if you are at all interested in horror of the 1920's . This game can add much to any role-playing campaign."

In Issue 19 of Abyss (June 1982), Dave Nalle warned that this game demanded a lot from both gamemasters and players, saying, "This is a low-mechanics game. Most of the systems given are purely functional, with ornamentation left to the GM. Unnecessary mechanics are avoided, and there is significant reliance on the skill and inventiveness of the GM. It is not a game suited to beginning players, because, while they could easily play it, they wouldn't get anywhere near what they should out of it." Nalle especially liked the "Sourcebook for the 1920s", calling it "A particularly bright star in the game ... everything you need to know to set a historically and socially believable campaign in the 1920s. It is the kind aid I'd really like to see more of." Nalle concluded by calling it "an excellent game ... I suspect that if Call of Cthulhu is half as successful as many games which are less good, it will give birth to a rash of similar games, both set in other periods and literary sources. It may be the start of a renaissance for the modern-era role-playing games which have been in the shadow of medieval and heroic fantasy games for a long time. Pool your money, buy the game. It is a worthwhile investment."

Multiple reviews of various editions appeared in Space Gamer/Fantasy Gamer.

- In the March 1982 edition (No. 49), William A. Barton noted that there were some shortcomings resulting from an assumption by the designers that players would have access to rules from RuneQuest that were not in Call of Cthulhu, but otherwise Barton called the game "an excellent piece of work.... The worlds of H. P. Lovecraft are truly open for the fantasy gamer."
- In the October–November 1987 edition (No. 80), Lisa Cohen reviewed the 3rd edition, saying, ""This book can be for collectors of art, players, or anyone interested in knowledge about old time occult. It is the one reprint that is worth the money."

Multiple reviews of various editions appeared in White Dwarf.

- In the August 1982 edition (Issue 32), Ian Bailey admired much about the first edition of the game; his only criticism was that the game was too "U.S. orientated and consequently any Keeper... who wants to set his game in the UK will have a lot of research to do." Bailey gave the game an above average rating of 9 out of 10, saying, "Call of Cthulhu is an excellent game and a welcome addition to the world of role-playing."
- In the August 1986 edition (Issue 80), Ashley Shepherd thought the inclusion of much material in the 3rd edition that had been previously published as supplementary books "makes the game incredibly good value." He concluded, "This package is going to keep Call of Cthulhu at the front of the fantasy game genre."

Several reviews of various editions and supplements also appeared in Dragon.

- In the May 1982 edition (Issue 61), David Cook thought the rules were too complex for new gamers, but said, "It is a good game for experienced role-playing gamers and ambitious judges, especially if they like Lovecraft's type of story."
- In the August 1987 edition (Issue 124), Ken Rolston reviewed the Terror Australis supplement for 3rd edition that introduced an Australian setting in the 1920s. Bambra thought that "Literate, macabre doom shambles from each page. Good reading, and a good campaign setting for COC adventures."
- In the October 1988 edition (Issue 138), Ken Rolston gave an overview of the 3rd edition, and placed it ahead of its competitors due to superior campaign setting, tone and atmosphere, the player characters as investigators, and the use of realistic player handouts such as authentic-looking newspaper clippings. Rolston concluded, "CoC is one of role-playing's acknowledged classics. Its various supplements over the years have maintained an exceptional level of quality; several, including Shadows of Yog-Sothoth and Masks of Nyarlathotep, deserve consideration among the greatest pinnacles of the fantasy role-playing game design."
- In the June 1990 edition (Issue 158), Jim Bambra liked the updated setting of the 4th edition, placing the game firmly in Lovecraft's 1920s. He also liked the number of adventures included in the 192-page rulebook: "The fourth edition contains enough adventures to keep any group happily entertained and sanity blasted." However, while Cook questioned whether owners of the 2nd or 3rd edition would get good value for their money — "You lack only the car-chase rules and the improved layout of the three books in one. The rest of the material has received minor editing but no substantial changes" — Cook strongly recommended the new edition to newcomers, saying, "If you don't already play CoC, all I can do is urge you to give it a try.... discover for yourself why it has made so many converts since its release."
- In the October 1992 edition (Issue 186), Rick Swan admitted that he was skeptical that the 5th edition would offer anything new, but instead found that the new edition benefited from "fresh material, judicious editing, and thorough polishes." He concluded, "Few RPGs exceed the CoC game's scope or match its skillful integration of background and game systems. And there's no game more fun."

In his 1990 book The Complete Guide to Role-Playing Games, game critic Rick Swan gave the game a top rating of 4 out of 4, calling it "a masterpiece, easily the best horror RPG ever published and possibly the best RPG, period ... breathtaking in scope and as richly textured as a fine novel. All role-players owe it to themselves to experience this truly remarkable game."

In Issue 68 of Challenge, Craig Sheeley reviewed the fifth edition and liked the revisions. "The entire character generation process is highly streamlined and easily illustrated on a two-page flowchart." DeJong also liked the inclusion of material from all three of CoC's settings (1890s, 1920s, 1990s), calling it "One of the best features of this edition." And he was very impressed with the layout of the book, commenting, "The organization and format of this book deserve special mention. I hold that every game company should study this book to learn what to do right." DeJong concluded, "I am seriously impressed with this product. From cover to cover, it's well done."

In a reader poll conducted by the British magazine Arcane in 1996 to determine the 50 most popular roleplaying games of all time, Call of Cthulhu was ranked 1st. Editor Paul Pettengale commented: "Call of Cthulhu is fully deserved of the title as the most popular roleplaying system ever - it's a game that doesn't age, is eminently playable, and which hangs together perfectly. The system, even though it's over ten years old, it still one of the very best you'll find in any roleplaying game. Also, there's not a referee in the land who could say they've read every Lovecraft inspired book or story going, so there's a pretty-well endless supply of scenario ideas. It's simply marvellous."

Scott Taylor for Black Gate in 2013 rated Call of Cthulhu as #4 in the top ten role-playing games of all time, saying "With various revisions, but never a full rewrite of its percentile-based system, Call of Cthulhu might be antiquated by today's standards, but remember it is supposed to be set in the 1920s, so to me that seems more than appropriate."

Call of Cthulhu has been reported to be the second-most popular game played on the virtual table top platform Roll20 in 2021 (the most popular being Dungeons & Dragons). It has also been reported to have found success especially in Korea and Japan, and to have overtaken D&D in Japan.

In his 2023 book Monsters, Aliens, and Holes in the Ground, RPG historian Stu Horvath noted up to this point in time, "roleplaying games are united in one way: In some fashion, they are all power fantasies. Characters go someplace, kill some things, find some loot, and maybe gain enough experience points to unlock their hidden personal potential in the form of new spells or a new power." Horvath then pointed out that this game, as the first horror RPG, had an essential difference: "Horror, as a genre, is generally concerned with powerlessness ... In a complete inversion of other RPGs, characters in Call of Cthulhu are doomed." About the game itself, Horvath commented, "I find Call of Cthulhu unabashedly fun, despite the scares and the despair ... The slumbering god is certainly one of the strangest of pop culture canonizations, but there seems to be an endless appetite — and deep wallets — for all things Cthulhu. So long as that remains true, the Great Old One will continue to loom large over RPGs."

== Awards ==
The game has won multiple awards:

- 1982, Origins Awards, Best Role Playing Game
- 1981, Game Designer's Guild, Select Award
- 1985, Games Day Award, Best Role Playing Game
- 1986, Games Day Award, Best Contemporary Role Playing Game
- 1987, Games Day Award, Best Other Role Playing Game
- 1993, Leeds Wargame Club, Best Role Playing Game
- 1994, Gamer's Choice Award, Hall of Fame
- 1995, Origins Award, Hall of Fame
- 2001, Origins Award, Best Graphic Presentation of a Book Product (for Call of Cthulhu 20th anniversary edition)
- 2002 Gold Ennie Award for "Best Graphic Design and Layout".
- 2003, GamingReport.com readers voted it as the number-one Gothic/Horror RPG
- 2014, ENNIE Awards - Call of Cthulhu 7th Edition Quickstart - 'Best Free Product (Silver)'
- 2016, UK Games Expo Awards - 'Best Roleplaying Game'
- 2017, Beasts of War Awards - 'Best RPG'
- 2017, Dragon Con Awards - 'Best Science Fiction or Fantasy Miniatures/Collectible Card/Role Playing Game' (for Pulp Cthulhu rules)
- 2017, ENNIE Awards - 'Best Supplement (Gold)' (for Pulp Cthulhu rules)
- 2017, ENNIE Awards - 'Best Cover Art (Gold)' (for Call of Cthulhu Investigator Handbook)
- 2017, ENNIE Awards - 'Best Cartography (Gold)' (for Call of Cthulhu Keeper Screen Pack)
- 2017, ENNIE Awards - 'Best Aid/Accessory (Gold)' (for Call of Cthulhu Keeper Screen Pack)
- 2017, ENNIE Awards - 'Best Production Values (Gold)' (for Call of Cthulhu Slipcase Set)
- 2018, Tabletop Gaming Magazine 'Top 150 Greatest Games of All Time' - Call of Cthulhu - Ranked #3 (Reader Poll)
- 2019, ENNIE Awards - 'Best Rules (Gold)' (for Call of Cthulhu Starter Set)
- 2024, ENNIE Awards - 'Best Writing (Gold)' and 'Best Adventure – Long Form (Silver)' for Call of Cthulhu: Alone Against the Static

== See also ==
- Arkham Horror - a cooperative board game based on the Mythos.
- Cthulhu Live - a live action role-playing game version of Call of Cthulhu.
- CthulhuTech - another role-playing game, conceived for a "Cthulhu science-fiction setting".
- List of Call of Cthulhu books

== Sources ==
- Lhomme, Tristan (July–August 1992). "Call of Cthulhu, la 5e édition américaine". Casus Belli (70): 26. Review (in French)
