= Demiplane (company) =

American game company

- Industry: Tabletop role-playing games
- Founded: 2019; 7 years ago
- Founders: Peter Romenesko; Travis Frederick
- Headquarters: Green Bay, Wisconsin
- Key people: Peter Romenesko (CEO); Travis Frederick (COO)
- Products: Nexus
- Services: Role-playing game matchmaking; Role-playing game virtual hosting
- Parent: Roll20
- Website: www.demiplane.com

Demiplane is a company that creates digital toolsets for playing tabletop role-playing games which can be used as an aid to playing in person or remotely online. The Demiplane platform's main services are game matchmaking, game hosting and licensed content via the Nexus digital toolset. Nexus provides access to digital rulebooks, adventures, and other supplements; it also provides digital tools like a character builder and character sheets. The platform was launched in 2020; early access to Nexus launched in 2021. In June 2024, the company was acquired by the virtual tabletop (VTT) company Roll20.

The company has also produced and broadcast several web series on their official Twitch and YouTube channels. This includes the ongoing actual play web series Children of Éarte created and run by Deborah Ann Woll which launched in March 2022.

== History ==
=== Origins ===
In 2019, Demiplane was founded by Peter Romenesko and Travis Frederick with the platform launching officially in 2020. Romenesko and Frederick grew up in the Lake Geneva area playing tabletop games together "and eventually re-united to build Demiplane". Demiplane acts as a platform for various tabletop role-playing game tools such as game hosting and matchmaking, shared game journals, and digital compendiums for licensed games. The company has received funding from TitletownTech and uses TitletownTech's startup incubator office space.

In March 2021, Adam Bradford – founder of D&D Beyond – joined the company as the Chief Development Officer. From October to December 2021, Demiplane announced three partnerships for their new Nexus digital toolset: Pathfinder Nexus with Paizo, World of Darkness Nexus (for games such as Vampire: The Masquerade and Werewolf: the Apocalypse) with Paradox Interactive, and Free League Nexus with Free League Publishing. An early access version of Pathfinder Nexus, titled Pathfinder Primer, was launched at the time of the announcement. Nexus has been called the "equivalent to digital toolset D&D Beyond" for other role-playing games.

In April 2022, Demiplane announced that they will host the new Marvel tabletop role-playing game titled Marvel Multiverse Role-Playing Game NEXUS with the digital playtest rulebook and early access given to users who pre-order the game. In June 2022, early access for Vampire: The Masquerade Nexus was launched. This is the first Demiplane toolset to include digital/physical bundles for a roleplaying game. Demiplane also announced that they are developing Nexus support for the World of Darkness game Hunter: The Reckoning. In October 2022, Magpie Games announced that early access for Avatar Legends Nexus, Demiplane's digital toolset Avatar Legends: The Roleplaying Game, was launching that month.

In February 2023, Demiplane announced the upcoming 5E Nexus which will support third-party Dungeons & Dragons 5th Edition (D&D) publishers who use the D&D 5.1 System Reference Document; this announcement included "pre-launch" tools such as 5E group matchmaking and group creation. A rule compendium, a digital reader, and a character builder are scheduled to be released in waves over 2023. Bradford said the intent at the moment was not to partner with Wizards of the Coast on official D&D products. In September 2023, early access for 5E Nexus launched with third party sourcebooks such as Tal'Dorei Reborn by Darrington Press, Tome of Beasts 1 & 2 by Kobold Press and Grim Hollow: The Monster Grimoire by Ghostfire Games. In October 2023, digital character tools officially launched for Vampire: The Masquerade. In February 2024, full access to Alien RPG Nexus for Free League's ALIEN: The Roleplaying Game is scheduled to launch.

=== Acquisition by Roll20 ===
In June 2024, it was announced that the virtual tabletop (VTT) company Roll20 had acquired Demiplane. Roll20 CEO Ankit Lal stated: "We want to make it as easy as possible for you to build your first character, to get into your first game, to try out playing TTRPGs. And we think the combination of the Roll20 VTT and the Demiplane character sheet ecosystem is going to do that". Christian Hoffer of ComicBook.com reported that this acquisition "won't have any immediate impact on users of either platform, but Demiplane CEO Peter Romenesko noted that the merged companies will look to close the difference between their two platforms very quickly". Roll20 stated that they "don’t plan on making any changes to the 5e Nexus on Demiplane".

J. R. Zambrano, for Bell of Lost Souls, commented that "it seems that an era of consolidation is on the way as players like WotC and Roll20 move to consolidate their powerbases". It was also announced that due to the merger between Roll20 and Demiplane, Adam Bradford would be leaving the company. Bradford then announced that he would join SmiteWorks, which operates the virtual tabletop Fantasy Grounds, as their new Chief Development Officer.

== Toolsets ==
Demiplane's content and game management system is primarily browser-based, and is fully functional on both mobile and desktop browsers.

=== Game matchmaking ===
Demiplane provides a free matchmaking service for over 180 roleplaying games; it is modeled on the matchmaking services offered in online multiplayer video games. Users can select various attributes such as group size and game style/themes. These user selections go into an algorithm to match groups together which includes the option of chat discussion to review expectations with the Game Master. After games, players and Game Masters can rate each other; other users can see these ratings during future matchmaking.

=== Game hosting ===
Demiplane's free game hosting service provides text and video chats for users in a game; this feature also provides breakout rooms for Game Masters to use to "reveal secrets to specific players". The platform provides tools for hosted games such as dice rolling, "shared and searchable journals", and task/inventory tracking. Demiplane has built in roleplaying game safety tools such as a raise hand button which anonymously flags to the Game Master that a player feels the game is going outside of pre-determined boundaries. In 2021, Frederick stated that Demiplane isn't intended as a virtual tabletop (VTT) platform or to compete with VTT companies such as Fantasy Grounds and Roll20. Instead, Frederick sees Demiplane as "sideways compatible" with VTT platforms as users can launch VTTs "from within Demiplane".

Game Masters also have the option to host paid game sessions on Demiplane by setting the cost per player and players have the option to provide tips. Demiplane facilitates payment – Game Masters receive 95% of the cost per player & tips; players are charged a 5.5% fee (based on the cost per player and on tips) by Demiplane.

=== Nexus ===
Customers can use a specific game's Nexus by purchasing access to licensed content in Demiplane's marketplace. Nexus provides access to a digital reader for role-playing game rulebooks, compendium content, and character sheets for licensed games. The compendium content is a digital version of the book (as HTML, not a PDF); it includes cross-links and tooltips for game rules mentioned in the text. Access to the book's options in the rest of Nexus allows purchased content to be used with the character builder and other tools. It can also provide additional features to hosted games.

Users can purchase access to games such as: Pathfinder Second Edition, the Marvel Multiverse Role-Playing Game, Vampire: The Masquerade 5th Edition, the ALIEN: The Roleplaying Game, Mutant: Year Zero, Avatar Legends: The Roleplaying Game, Hunter: The Reckoning, and Candela Obscura.

Following the purchase of Demiplane, Roll20 began to support cross-platform access so that content unlocked on one platform would be automatically unlocked on the other platform. As of May 2024, Paizo, Darrington Press, Kobold Press, and Renegade Game Studio have granted permission for cross-platform access to their products.

== Streaming shows ==
The company has also produced and broadcast the following shows on their official Twitch and YouTube channels:

- Heroes of the Planes (2021) – an actual play web series using the Fifth Edition of Dungeons & Dragons, led by Todd Kenreck as the Dungeon Master with the cast of players featuring Hope LaVelle, B. Dave Walters, Jennifer Kretchmer, Adam Bradford, Lauren Urban and Meagan Kenreck. It follows adventurers as they travel the multiverse. It ran for 37 episodes.
- Demiplanar (2021) – B. Dave Walters hosts a web talk show where he interviews various people in the tabletop role-playing game industry. It ran for 11 episodes.
- Strixhaven CHAOS (2022) – an actual play eight-part limited series using the Fifth Edition of Dungeons & Dragons, led by B. Dave Walters as the Dungeon Master with the cast of players featuring Hope LaVelle, Jennifer Kretchmer, Lauren Urban and Adam Bradford. The game is set in the Strixhaven campaign setting.
- Children of Éarte (2022) – an ongoing actual play web series using the Fifth Edition of Dungeons & Dragons, led by Deborah Ann Woll as the Dungeon Master with the cast of players featuring Hope LaVelle, Alicia Marie, Adam Bradford, Lauren Urban, and Jennifer Kretchmer. The show has been described as a "fairy tale for grown ups". The show was nominated for the "Best Overlay Design (Actual Play Video)" and the "Outstanding Actual Play (Video)" awards at the 2023 New Jersey Web Festival; Woll was nominated for the "Best Game Master (Actual Play Video)" award and Urban was nominated for the "Best Player Character Performance" award for their work on the show.
- Extinction Race (2022) – an actual play four-part limited series using the Mutant: Year Zero ruleset, led by Josh Simons as the Game Master with the cast of players featuring Aliza Pearl, Catie Osborn, Mellie Doucette, Michelle Nguyen Bradley and Omega Jones. The show corresponded with launch of the Mutant: Year Zero Nexus.
