= Travis Frederick =

American football player (born 1991)

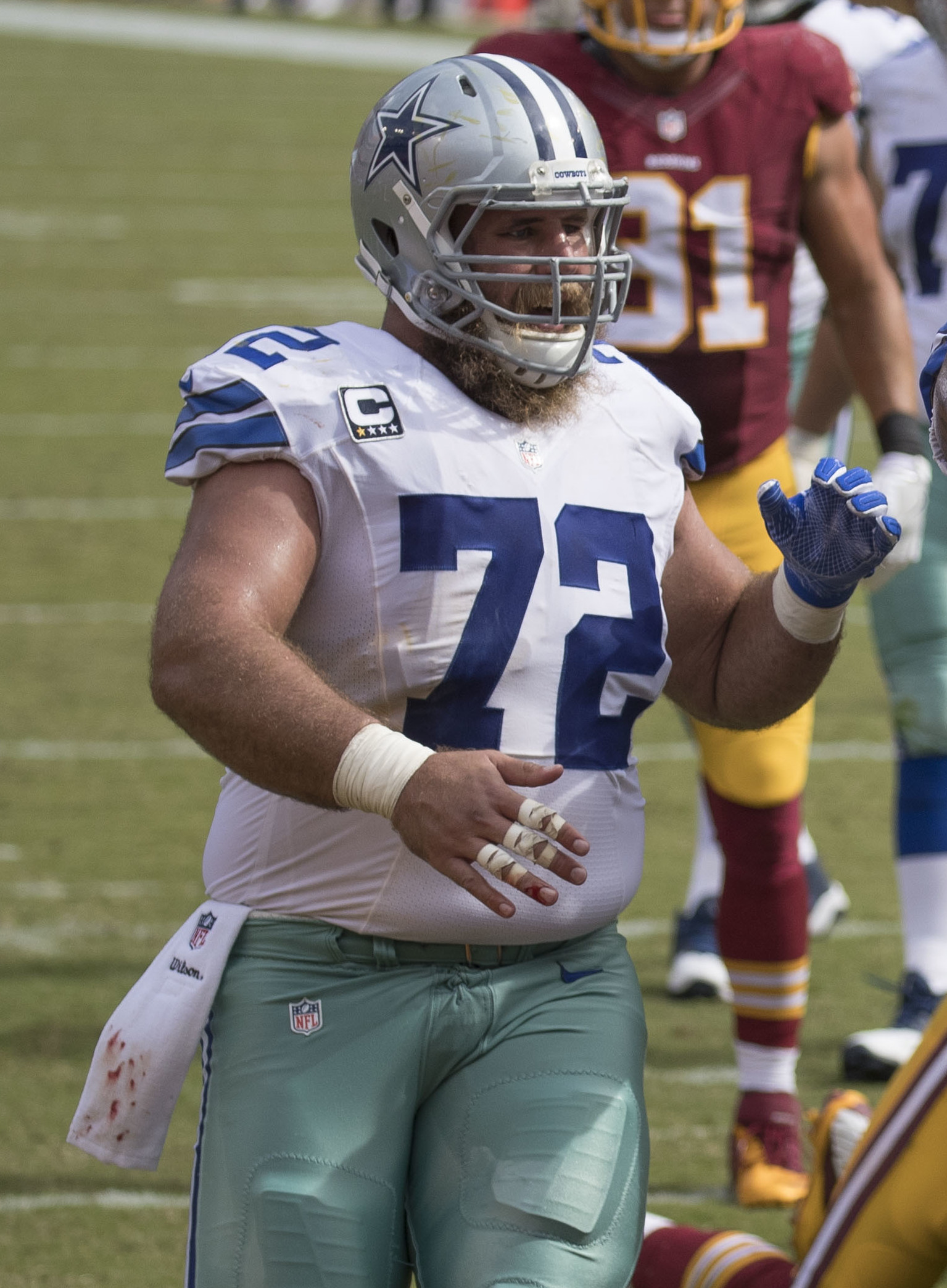
- Frederick with the Dallas Cowboys in 2016

No. 72
- Position: Center

Personal information
- Born: March 18, 1991 (age 35); Sharon, Wisconsin, U.S.
- Listed height: 6 ft 4 in (1.93 m)
- Listed weight: 320 lb (145 kg)

Career information
- High school: Big Foot (Walworth, Wisconsin)
- College: Wisconsin (2009–2012)
- NFL draft: 2013: 1st round, 31st overall pick

Career history
- Dallas Cowboys (2013–2019)

Awards and highlights
- First-team All-Pro (2016); 2× Second-team All-Pro (2014, 2015); 5× Pro Bowl (2014–2017, 2019); PFWA All-Rookie Team (2013); Built Ford Tough Offensive Line of the Year (2016); George Halas Award (2020); First-team All-American (2012); First-team All-Big Ten (2012); Second-team All-Big Ten (2011)

Career NFL statistics
- Games played: 96
- Games started: 96
- Stats at Pro Football Reference

Travis Frederick (born March 18, 1991) is an American former professional football player who spent his entire seven-year career as a center for the Dallas Cowboys of the National Football League (NFL). He played college football for the Wisconsin Badgers and was selected 31st overall by the Cowboys in the first round of the 2013 NFL draft. In his time as a Cowboy he was elected to five Pro Bowls and he was an All-Pro in 2014, 2015 and 2016. Frederick is now the co-founder & chief operating officer of the tabletop role-playing game company Demiplane.

== Early life ==
A native of Sharon, Wisconsin, Frederick attended Big Foot High School in Walworth, where he was an all-state two-way lineman. He helped his high school team to second place in the 2008 WIAA Division 4 state playoffs.

Frederick was also on Big Foot's track team. He finished second in the shot put at the 2008 'BDN' Invite, with a throw of 15.23 meters (50 ft 0 in). Frederick took silver in the discus throw at the 2008 WIAA Sectional Championships, with a throw of 49.30 meters (161 ft 9 in).

Regarded as a three-star recruit by Rivals.com, Frederick was ranked as the No. 83 offensive tackle prospect in his class.

== College career ==
Frederick attended the University of Wisconsin–Madison, and played for the Wisconsin Badgers football team from 2009 to 2012. After graduating high school early to participate in spring practice, Frederick became the first true freshman in Badgers history to start a season-opening game on the offensive line, when he lined up at center against Northern Illinois. An ankle injury in week 2 knocked him out of the starting lineup, but he returned for the final two games, at left guard, after center Peter Konz was sidelined (blood clots) and John Moffitt was moved to center. For the season, he played in five games, starting four (two at center and two at left guard).

In order to preserve a year of Frederick's NCAA eligibility, Wisconsin coaching staff decided to redshirt him in 2010. In his redshirt sophomore season, Frederick replaced John Moffitt, starting 11 of 13 games at left guard. For two games, he had to substitute for Peter Konz at center.

Following Konz's departure for the 2012 NFL draft, Frederick was moved to center his junior season. He started all 13 games at center and was named a first-team All-American by Pro Football Weekly.

== Professional career ==
Considered the best center in his class by Mel Kiper Jr. of ESPN, Frederick decided to enter the 2013 NFL draft as an underclassman. He was projected to be a second- to third-round selection.

At the NFL Combine, Frederick ran a 5.58 in the 40-yard dash, second-slowest among offensive lineman. He also posted a below-average 21 repetitions in the 225 lb bench press.

Pre-draft measurables
Height	Weight	Arm length	Hand span	40-yard dash	10-yard split	20-yard split	20-yard shuttle	Three-cone drill	Vertical jump	Broad jump	Bench press
6 ft 3 5/8 in (1.92 m)	312 lb (142 kg)	33 in (0.84 m)	10 in (0.25 m)	5.58 s	1.91 s	3.20 s	4.76 s	7.81 s	28 1/2 in (0.72 m)	8 ft 1 in (2.46 m)	21 reps
All values from NFL Combine

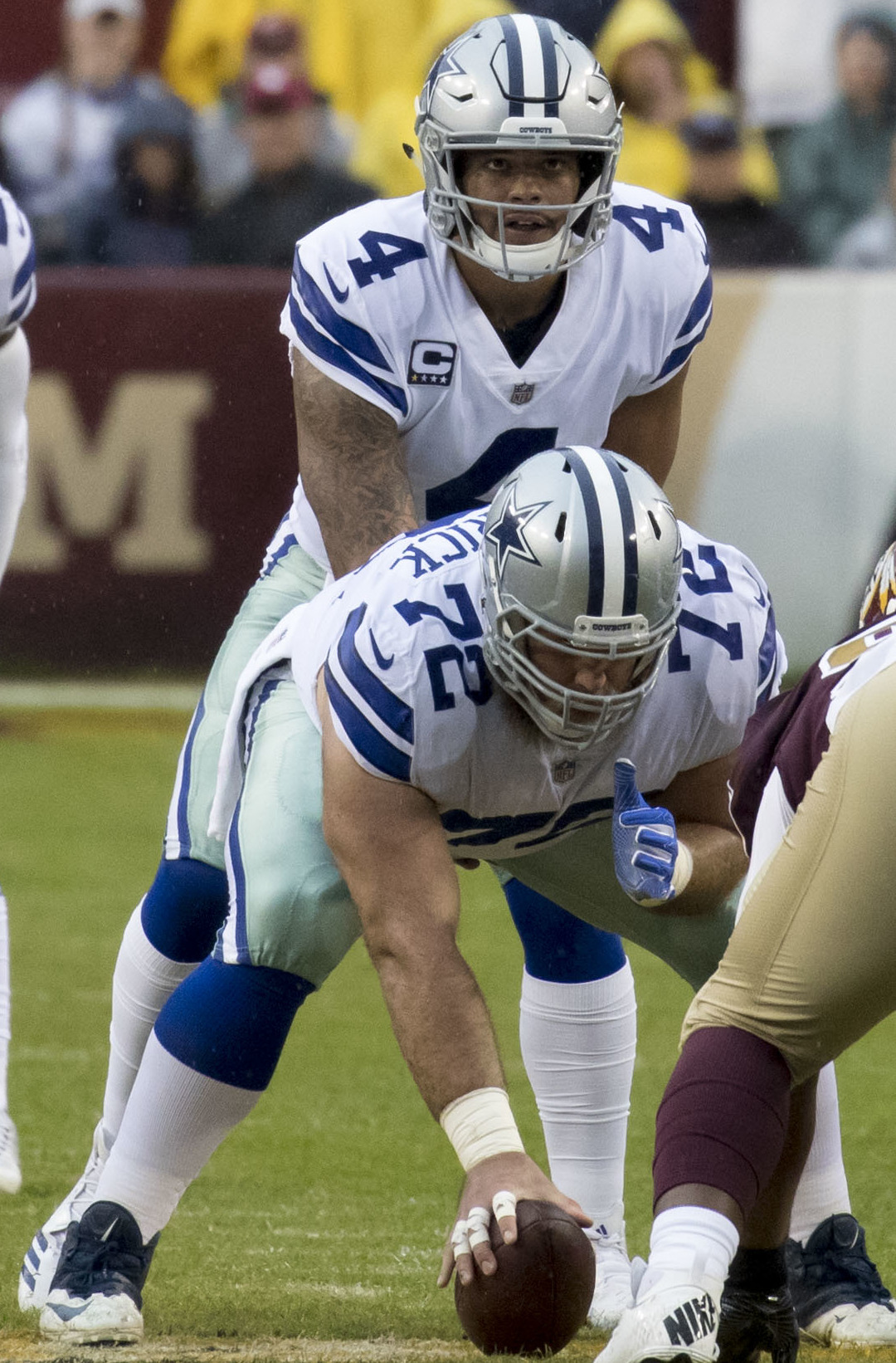
Frederick snapping the football to Dak Prescott in 2017

In the 2013 NFL draft, the Dallas Cowboys traded down in the first round with the San Francisco 49ers in exchange for a third-round pick (used to draft Terrance Williams). In the first round, the team selected Frederick after eight offensive linemen were drafted before him. This decision caused a stir in the media because it was not only seen as a reach, but the trade was also criticized for bringing poor compensation after moving down 13 positions.

Frederick was named a starter from the first day of Organized Team Activities in the preseason, replacing Phil Costa, who had been the starter in the previous two years. He became the first rookie in franchise history to start every game at center and was selected to the NFL All-Rookie team.

The next year, he continued his development, by anchoring what was arguably considered as the best offensive line in the league and was also named to his first Pro Bowl.

In 2015, he had to work with four different starting quarterbacks with varying degrees of knowledge of the team's offense, which required him to make more protection calls. He was named to his second Pro Bowl.

On August 13, 2016, Frederick signed a six-year, $56.4 million contract extension with the Cowboys, making him the highest-paid center in the league.

Before the start of the 2016 season, Frederick was named one of the five team captains. That year, Frederick helped pave the way for rookie running back Ezekiel Elliott to the NFL rushing yards leader and his first Pro Bowl while protecting rookie quarterback Dak Prescott to his first Pro Bowl as well. He was named to his third straight Pro Bowl and was named First-team All-Pro, both honors being shared with fellow Cowboy offensive linemen Tyron Smith and Zack Martin. He was also ranked 87th on the NFL Top 100 Players of 2017 as the only center in the list.

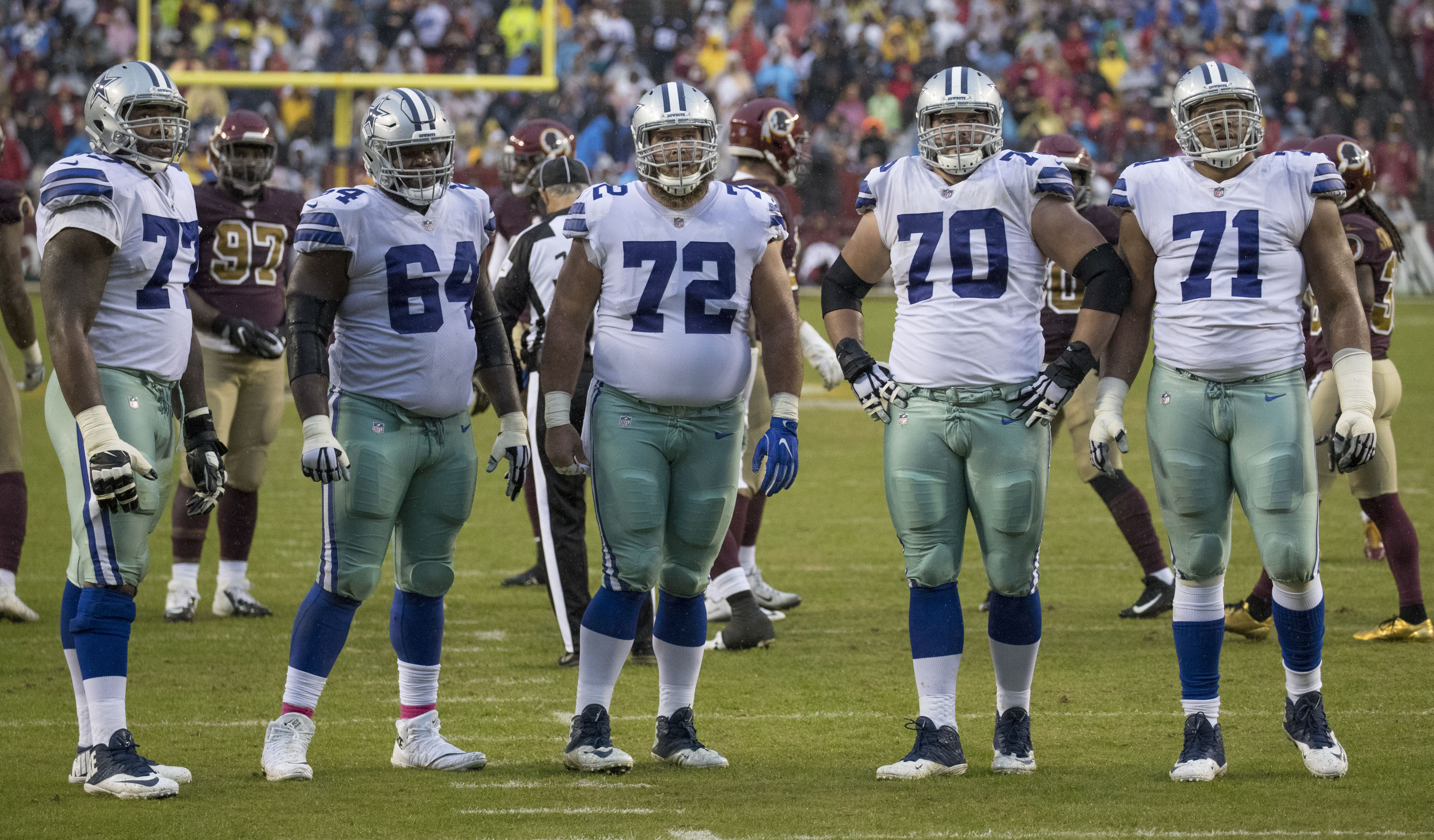
The Cowboys' offensive line in 2017

On December 19, 2017, Frederick was named to his fourth straight Pro Bowl alongside tackle Tyron Smith and guard Zack Martin for the second straight year.

On September 3, 2018, Frederick was placed on injured reserve to start the 2018 season after being diagnosed with Guillain–Barré syndrome on August 22. He was inactive for the first four games before being placed on the reserve/non-football illness list on October 6, 2018.

Frederick was named to his fifth Pro Bowl in 2019.

On March 23, 2020, Frederick announced his retirement from professional football.

== Other endeavors ==
Frederick, with Peter Romenesko, co-founded Demiplane in 2019. Demiplane acts as a digital platform for various tabletop role-playing game tools such as game hosting and matchmaking along with digital compendiums for licensed games; the platform launched in 2020. Frederick is the company's chief operating officer. On the change of direction in his career, Frederick said, "I really enjoy the challenge of something new". In June 2024, Demiplane was acquired by the virtual tabletop company Roll20.

== Personal life ==
Frederick double majored in computer engineering and computer science at the University of Wisconsin.

On August 22, 2018, Frederick was diagnosed with Guillain–Barré syndrome.

Frederick has two brothers, Tyler and Collin.
