= Acquisitions Incorporated =

Dungeons & Dragons fantasy role-playing game source book

- Cover art by Mike Krahulik
- Rules required: Dungeons & Dragons, 5th edition
- Character levels: 1–6
- Campaign setting: Forgotten Realms
- Lead designers: Jerry Holkins, Elyssa Grant, Scott Fitzgerald Gray
- Authors: Shawn Merwin, Teos Abadía, Chris S. Sims, Ben Petrisor, Jeremy Crawford
- First published: June 18, 2019
- ISBN: 9780786966905

Acquisitions Incorporated is a sourcebook for the 5th edition of the Dungeons & Dragons fantasy role-playing game. The book includes content of the actual play series of the same name by the creators of Penny Arcade, which is among the longest-running actual play series. Acquisitions Incorporated uses satire and the series' signature office humor as an introduction to Dungeons & Dragons. The book includes an adventure for beginner players.

== Publication history ==
=== Background ===
In 2008, the creators of Penny Arcade partnered with Wizards of the Coast to create an actual play podcast of a few 4th Edition Dungeons & Dragons adventures which led to the creation of the Acquisitions Incorporated. After the podcast was well-received, the players began livestreaming games starting in 2010 at the PAX festival. In 2012, Acquisitions Incorporated switched to 5th Edition Dungeons & Dragons as their game system with the Forgotten Realms as their new campaign setting. In 2019, this work led to the official Acquisitions Incorporated sourcebook featuring the series' concept and characters.

=== Release ===
Acquisitions Incorporated was published by Wizards of the Coast on June 18, 2019. The sourcebook was the first "partnership with an outside design team since 2015" and marked the first time in 5th Edition Dungeons & Dragons that third-party intellectual property became part of Wizards of the Coast canon. Originally, Penny Arcade approached Wizards of the Coast on crowdfunding in order to create the sourcebook. Following discussions, Wizards of the Coast suggested publishing it as an official sourcebook.

Jeremy Crawford, Dungeons & Dragons lead rules designer and an Acquisitions Incorporated Dungeon Master, "said Wizards gave Penny Arcade plenty of creative liberty, stepping back and offering advice here and there especially for game design but leaving storytelling to their new partners". Syfy Wire commented on the different art styles of Wizards of the Coast and Penny Arcade; rather than merging these styles, the art team "used both, with high fantasy art styles rendered by Wizards artists for larger pieces and then smaller illustrations more reflective of the Penny Arcade comics style. Browsing the pages, it feels like a standard D&D book in many ways, infused with that unique AI spirit throughout".

Acquisitions Incorporated was also released as a digital product through the following Wizards of the Coast licensees: D&D Beyond, Fantasy Grounds, and Roll20. To mark their subsequent acquisition of D&D Beyond, Wizards of the Coast gave registered D&D Beyond users the digital edition of Acquisitions Incorporated in May 2022.

== Reception ==
In Publishers Weekly's "Best-selling Books Week Ending July 1, 2019", Acquisitions Incorporated was #13 in "Hardcover Nonfiction" with 5,870 units sold.

Gavin Sheehan of Bleeding Cool noted that the book is filled with humor, summarizes the series well and its content allows for an enjoyable alternative to serious playing. Richard Jansen-Parkes, for the UK print magazine Tabletop Gaming, called the sourcebook a "wonderful supplement" for pre-existing Acquisitions Incorporated fans and "still worth checking out" for non-fans who wish to incorporate "absurd comedy". He opined that the player options are not "revolutionary", however, they are "damned fun and have the chance to be genuinely funny too. This strong sense of humour and absurdity extends through the lengthy campaign that takes up much of the book's page count". Christian Hoffer of ComicBook.com wrote that the sourcebook "has a decidedly different tone and feel than other D&D publication, with a careful balance of humorous commentary that captures the spirit of the Acquisitions Incorporated podcast and providing a robust set of practical faction rules for founding and growing a new Acquisitions Incorporated franchise within any home game". Hoffer praised the codification and expansion of common player roles, such as item hoarder or strategist, with the sourcebook's Company Positions system, noting that it rewards common player "behavior by giving them extra abilities that makes their jobs easier to do".

Sheehan's review praised the adventure The Orrery of the Wanderer but criticized that certain characters from the series and a location map were missing. Jansen-Parkes noted that behind the adventure's "silly façade" there "is a genuinely well-written, well-structured story. It's heavily scripted in the very beginning and the nature of playing a franchise means the party is rarely in total control of their goals, but there are plenty of opportunities for players to forge creative paths through the melee". Hoffer called the adventure "fun", commenting that the "lore and corporate humor of Acquisitions Incorporated" is a requirement but the adventure is "short enough to give players a taste of that world without requiring a full multi-year commitment to building a franchise".
