= Call of Cthulhu Investigator Sheets =

Fantasy tabletop role-playing game supplement

Investigator Sheets
Diabolical Dossiers of Doom
- Publishers: Chaosium
- Publication: 1993; 33 years ago
- Genres: Horror
- Systems: Basic Role-Playing

Investigator Sheets, subtitled "Diabolical Dossiers of Doom", is a supplemental product published by Chaosium in 1993 for the horror role-playing game Call of Cthulhu.

== Contents ==
Chaosium first published the Lovecraftian horror role-playing game Call of Cthulhu in 1981, and subsequently produced a number of editions, including the 5th edition in 1992. The following year, Chaosium produced two supplemental products for use with the 5th edition under the subtitle "Diabolical Dossiers of Doom": a package of various blank certificates called Dire Documents; and Investigator Sheets, a set of character sheets for the three standard eras used in the game: the 1890s, 1920s, and 1990s.

== Reception ==
In the October 1993 edition of Dragon (#198), Rick Swan questioned why any player with access to a photocopier would need these.

== Other recognition ==
A copy of Investigator Sheets is held in the "Edwin and Terry Murray Collection of Role-Playing Games, 1972-2017" at Duke University.
