= Dire Documents =

Fiction horror role-playing game supplement

Incriminating Evidence, Lawyerly Letters, and Lunatic Forms.
- Publishers: Chaosium
- Publication: 1993; 33 years ago
- Genres: Horror
- Systems: Basic Role-Playing
- ISBN: 978-1568820033

Dire Documents, subtitled "Diabolical Dossiers of Doom", is a supplement published by Chaosium in 1993 for the horror role-playing game Call of Cthulhu.

== Contents ==
Chaosium first published the Lovecraftian horror role-playing game Call of Cthulhu in 1981, and subsequently produced a number of editions, including the 5th edition in 1992. The following year, Chaosium produced two supplemental products for use with the 5th edition under the subtitle "Diabolical Dossiers of Doom": Investigator Sheets, a set of blank character sheets; and Dire Documents, a pack of nine blank two-color forms, including:

- a certificate from the mayor for Meritorious Service
- an in-patient admission form for Arkham Sanitorium
- several letterheads of various firms, including an import-export company, an exotic-sounding society, Miskatonic University, the chief of staff of Arkham Sanitorium, and a legal firm
- a blank invitation to a formal reception
- a tongue-in-cheek award certificate for the Superlative Death of a player character

Each of these can be used by the gamemaster as player handouts in a role-playing game.

== Reception ==
In the October 1993 edition of Dragon (#198), Rick Swan called these "indispensable for Keepers who like to make their own clues or bewilder their friends." However, Swan questioned why Chaosium did not include a folder or envelope for storage.

== Reviews ==
- Australian Realms #11

== Other recognition ==
A copy of Dire Documents is held in the "Edwin and Terry Murray Collection of Role-Playing Games, 1972-2017" at Duke University.
