= D&D Beyond =

Official digital toolset and game companion for Dungeons & Dragons fifth edition

- Screenshot Main page of D&D Beyond, December 21, 2018
- Website type: Tabletop RPG Digital Toolset/Companion
- Available in: Multilingual
- Predecessor: D&D Insider
- Headquarters: Huntsville, Alabama, U.S.
- Owner: Hasbro
- Founders: Curse LLC, Adam Bradford
- Parent: Fandom, Inc. (2018–2022); Wizards of the Coast (2022–present)
- Website: www.dndbeyond.com
- Registration: Optional
- Launched: August 15, 2017; 9 years ago
- Current status: Active
- Content license: Media licensing varies
- Written in: .NET

D&D Beyond (DDB) is the official digital toolset and game companion for Dungeons & Dragons fifth edition. DDB hosts online versions of the official Dungeons & Dragons fifth edition books, including rulebooks, adventures, and other supplements. In addition to the official D&D content available to purchase, it also provides the ability to create and add custom homebrew content. Along with digital compendiums, D&D Beyond provides digital tools like a character builder and digital character sheet, monster and spell listings that can be sorted and filtered, and an encounter builder. It has two virtual tabletop (VTT) options for users – the 2D Maps VTT and the 3D Sigil VTT. D&D Beyond also publishes original video, stream, and article content, including interviews with Dungeons & Dragons staff, content previews and tie-ins, and development updates.

D&D Beyond was formerly operated by Curse LLC, a subsidiary of Twitch. However, on December 12, 2018, Fandom, Inc. announced that it had acquired all of Curse's media assets, including D&D Beyond. On April 13, 2022, Hasbro announced that it would be acquiring D&D Beyond. The official transfer to Wizards of the Coast, a division of Hasbro, occurred on May 18, 2022.

== History ==
D&D Beyond was launched on August 15, 2017, after an initial beta test that started on March 21, 2017. Adam Bradford was the project lead for D&D Beyond. D&D Beyond was developed for the 5th Edition of Dungeons & Dragons through a partnership between Curse and Wizards of the Coast. A similar online toolset, D&D Insider, had been developed for the 4th Edition of Dungeons & Dragons by Wizards of the Coast; however, it was not updated to support the new edition.

=== Acquisition by Fandom ===
On December 12, 2018, Fandom, Inc. announced that it had acquired all of Curse LLC's media assets, including D&D Beyond, for an undisclosed amount. In June 2019, D&D Beyond added an Encounter Builder tool set which was open to subscribers for alpha testing. Encounter Builder entered public beta testing in October 2019. In February 2020, D&D Beyond added a Combat Tracker which was open to subscribers for alpha testing.

On March 25, 2020, Bradford, now Vice President of Tabletop Gaming at Fandom, told Syfy Wire that D&D Beyond's normal number of new users had doubled in the past two weeks during the COVID-19 pandemic and that there was also a "similar increase in the number of active users". In April 2020, The Wall Street Journal reported that "Bradford said the number of registered users has tripled in the past month, and the number of online players at any one time has doubled on average. The uptake has forced the company to accelerate the expansion of its infrastructure, which otherwise would have taken place months from now".

In January 2021, James Haeck, lead writer for D&D Beyond, announced his departure from the company. In February 2021, Bradford, Todd Kenreck (creative manager at D&D Beyond & Fandom), and Lauren Urban (community manager for D&D Beyond) all announced their departure from Fandom for other projects.

=== Acquisition by Hasbro ===
On April 13, 2022, Hasbro announced its acquisition of D&D Beyond for $146.3 million, with plans to officially support previous purchases made on the service and have it be absorbed into Hasbro's Wizards of the Coast. The sale was subject to closing conditions and certain regulatory approvals, and was set to be completed in either Q2 or Q3 of 2022. Polygon highlighted that Wizards of the Coast is a large portion of "Hasbro's overall earnings since the launch of 5th edition D&D in 2014. With an operating profit of $547 million in 2021, Wizards' business unit accounted for 72% of Hasbro's operating profit for the year. Taking that into perspective, the purchase of D&D Beyond from Fandom for $146.3 million in cash seems like a small price to pay in order to lock down a platform with reportedly close to 10 million users". Gizmodo commented that once D&D Beyond is an official part of Wizards of the Coast, "they might offer some kind of cross capability with digital products across multiple sites, toolkits, and VTTs, making the capital barriers to gameplay less excruciating. [...] But also the uniform consolidation of digital tools under a single company's banner is not good for competition and therefore, causes the player to have fewer options for gameplay. [...] If fans still have to pay two or three times for a module, class, or item description across both WotC products and DnDBeyond, it's unlikely to create a sustainable market".

D&D Beyond accounts transferred to Wizards of the Coast on May 18, 2022. At that time, Wizards of the Coast's updated terms of service and privacy policy went into effect. To mark the acquisition, Wizards of the Coast gave registered D&D Beyond users the Acquisitions Incorporated (2019) supplement between May 16 and 26, 2022. Additionally, they made a starter adventure module, Lost Mine of Phandelver (2014), available to all registered users moving forward. Then in April and June, Wizards of the Coast released two new D&D Beyond exclusive supplements – the Monstrous Compendium Vol 1: Spelljammer Creatures (2022) and the Vecna Dossier (2022) respectively.

Linda Codega, for Io9 on January 5, 2023, reported on the details from a leaked full copy of the Open Game License (OGL) 1.1 including updated terms such as no longer authorizing use of the OGL1.0. Following this leak, numerous news outlets reported on negative reactions from both fans and professional content creators. (Note: Such as: Vice, The Guardian, CNBC, NME IGN, ICv2 and Inverse.) One response from the community was an online movement to cancel subscriptions to D&D Beyond with the Financial Times highlighting that it was the "go-to way of showing discontent". TheStreet commented that Wizards united its "entire player base" behind the movement to retain the original OGL with players responding "with their wallets" and that there were "allegedly" enough D&D Beyond cancellations to "cause the website to crash". Io9 reported that the impact of this boycott was "not negligible" and led to scrambling by upper management "to adjust their messaging around the situation"; per sources, there were "'five digits' worth of complaining tickets in the system" for customer service to handle account deletion requests. Within weeks, Wizards walked back changes to the OGL. The Motley Fool opined that Hasbro used D&D Beyond to "publish a mea culpa". Io9 also highlighted that the movement to boycott D&D Beyond was an effective message sent "to WotC and Hasbro higher-ups. According to multiple sources, these immediate financial consequences were the main thing that forced them to respond". Following the OGL retraction by Wizards, there was reported speculation on a major overhaul to D&D Beyond. In response, D&D Beyond stated this was "misinformation" – they refuted rumors of a price increase and that an artificial intelligence Dungeon Master would be introduced to the platform.

In an interview with The Verge in March 2023, Hasbro CEO Chris Cocks highlighted that digital tools such as D&D Beyond and Roll20 help enhance visuals during play without being as expensive as physical terrain and miniatures from high-end creators such as Dwarven Forge. Per Cocks, the pandemic accelerated the trend of digital play for Dungeons & Dragons. Cocks stated:

Today, probably about close to 50 percent of D&D games are played using some kind of digital tabletop, most frequently it's D&D Beyond, as an intermediary for play. We see that trend only continuing so that the vast, vast majority of play is going to involve a screen of some form, either to manage your character or to manage the visuals associated with the game. [...] [D&D Beyond] has deep integration with the content, and there are a lot of fantastic opportunities for adding visuals to it. We've had a friends-and-family playtest of an Unreal-based digital tabletop that's kind of a compendium to D&D Beyond. It adds an isometric, high-end 3D tabletop RPG experience to it that we think could be really cool, and it's something that we think people would enjoy playing.

The March 2023 D&D Direct presentation showed that the upcoming D&D Virtual Tabletop will be integrated with D&D Beyond, such as importing character sheets created on D&D Beyond. Wizards of the Coast highlighted that "a D&D Beyond playtest for the D&D Virtual Tabletop is planned for late 2023". At the July 2024 Hasbro investor meeting, Hasbro CEO Chris Cocks stated "that digital revenue on D&D Beyond 'accounts for over half' of" Dungeons & Dragons profits. Chase Carter of Rascal, commented that "we know physical books sell poorly, and even if pre-orders for the 2024 core books are, uh, 'solid', according to the CEO, it's evident that Hasbro holds little faith in analog games clotting the money bleed elsewhere in the company's structure".

In July 2024, Faith Elisabeth Lilley, a former senior producer for Wizards of the Coast, raised concerns that contributor credits for the digital team have been removed from the D&D Beyond editions of various sourcebooks and "shared screenshots" of the previous version of the credits which list include this team. TheGamer reported Lilley explained that the digital team worked with "the creators of several D&D books, and were assured that they would be credited for this work", however, no explanation on the removal has been given.

In August 2024, D&D Beyond announced that with the release of revised 5th Edition (2024) that toolsets will automatically be updated to the new ruleset; some backwards compatible aspects of 2014 5E will be marked as "legacy" content that can be used with the character sheets while other aspects will be removed entirely and will be only accessible by going into the compendium. J.R. Zambrano of Bell of Lost Souls highlighted that Wizards of the Coast stated the legacy tag "indicates material that does not follow the current rules of the game" and "that 'the current rules of the game' line reflects the 'living edition' or 'One D&D' language that was bandied about before someone at WotC decided they wanted to hang on to the '5E' branding". Christian Hoffer, for ComicBook.com, highlighted that the mechanical gameplay changes to spells are considered "upgrades to the existing rules" with "over 100 spells in the 2024 Player's Handbook have been either reworded or mechanically changed". Following public feedback, D&D Beyond announced that users will be able to "maintain their character options, spells, and magical items in their character sheets" using the 2014 ruleset and that the changes to character sheets will be limited to "relabeling and renaming" some aspects.

== Content ==
Books on D&D Beyond consist of the compendium content and access to that content's options in the rest of the toolset. The compendium content is a digital version of the book (as HTML, not a PDF), with all art and maps from the book as well; it includes cross-links and tooltips for monsters, mundane or magical items, spells, and relevant rules mentioned in the text. Access to the book's options in the rest of DDB's toolset allows those purchased subclasses, spells, magic items, monsters, and the like to be used with the character builder and other tools, and allows the user to see the full descriptions of purchased content in those listings (i.e., outside the compendium).

Official Dungeons & Dragons fifth edition sourcebooks released by Wizards of the Coast are available for purchase on D&D Beyond. Official content that is released for free by Wizards of the Coast is also accessible for free on D&D Beyond. This includes content from the basic rules and the System Reference Document (the "basic rules" on D&D Beyond are an inclusive combination of the two), and the races and spells from the Elemental Evil Player's Companion. From January 2018 to August 2021, active playtest content presented in the 5E Unearthed Arcana series on the official Dungeons & Dragons website was also available. Once the playtest period was concluded for Unearthed Arcana content (whether it is published in a book or retired, as determined by Wizards of the Coast), it was archived on D&D Beyond; existing characters already using the content are able to continue doing so, but the archived playtest content can not be newly added to a character. All remaining Unearthed Arcana content was archived on August 12, 2021.

On May 10, 2022, it was announced that the digital release of Mordenkainen Presents: Monsters of the Multiverse (2022) will correspond with the delisting of Volo's Guide to Monsters (2016) and Mordenkainen's Tome of Foes (2018) on D&D Beyond as Monsters of the Multiverse revises the player races and monsters previously published in those sourcebooks. D&D Beyond then confirmed that users will retain access to previously purchased copies of Volo's Guide to Monsters and Mordenkainen's Tome of Foes. D&D Beyond also stated that they "may update naming conventions of content to easily differentiate our listings" for users who have purchased access to both old and new content.

Starting in December 2022 with Dragonlance: Shadow of the Dragon, Wizards of the Coast began to offer physical/digital bundles where sourcebooks purchased directly from Wizards would also include the digital D&D Beyond edition. Christian Hoffer of ComicBook.com highlighted that this type of bundle had been requested by players "for years" and these bundles only became available after Wizards purchased D&D Beyond – "meaning that it would receive all the financial benefits from such a bundle". Hoffer commented that there were concerns on if these bundles "will hurt small game stores and local businesses," however, Wizards stated it "will continue to make alternate covers available exclusively to game stores to help incentivize players to support their local game store".

=== Toolsets ===
Unlocked compendium content can be accessed in various toolsets such as interactive character sheets and catalogs of spells, monsters and items. Additionally, D&D Beyond includes a homebrew creation tool which allows users to create and share homebrew versions of "spells, magical items, monsters, backgrounds, feats, races or subclasses". It also had an interactive overlay Twitch Extension for streamers to display "on-demand character statistics and status details from D&D Beyond". In 2020, D&D Beyond added a digital dice roller to character sheets with both free and premium digital dice. Dungeon Masters can create campaigns on D&D Beyond where players can add their character sheets. In 2020, D&D Beyond launched the "Encounter Builder" tool for Dungeon Masters to design and run combat encounters for their players.

Following the release of the updated Player's Handbook (2024) in September 2024, D&D Beyond replaced the following aspects of the 2014 5E ruleset with the 2024 revised 5E ruleset within the various toolsets: core gameplay definitions, armor class, saving throws, skills/abilities, alignment, senses (Blindsight, Darkvision, Tremorsense, Truesight), and area of effect definitions. Other aspects of the 2014 5E ruleset are marked as legacy content and are still usable within toolsets such as the character sheet and encounter builder. In character sheets, users are able to maintain all "character options, spells, and magical items" from the 2014 ruleset; additionally, users "with access to the 2024 and 2014 digital Player's Handbooks can select from both sources when creating new characters". The 2014 5E ruleset will continue to be accessible within the compendium.

=== Digital releases ===
Wizards of the Coast has also released some fifth edition content exclusively on D&D Beyond. Additionally, Wizards of the Coast began releasing the Unearthed Arcana playtest material for One D&D exclusively on D&D Beyond in August 2022; these releases are formatted as a PDF unlike other content on D&D Beyond and are not displayed in the normal compendium or toolsets.

Title	Author(s)	Date	Levels	Notes
Rrakkma	Chris Lindsay	May 18, 2018	9	An introductory Adventurers League adventure for Mordenkainen's Tome of Foes released for free on D&D Beyond with the purchase of the sourcebook.
Legends of Runeterra: Dark Tides of Bilgewater	James J. Haeck, Makenzie de Armas, Celeste Conowitch, Todd Kenreck, Faith Elisabeth Lilley	June 10, 2020 – August 10, 2020	3-4	A digital only setting sourcebook with short adventure released for free on D&D Beyond as part of a promotion with Riot Games and Google Play. This was not official D&D content.
Monstrous Compendium Vol 1: Spelljammer Creatures	Christopher Perkins, Jeremy Crawford	April 21, 2022	—N/a	Digital exclusive released for free on D&D Beyond.
Vecna Dossier	Wizards RPG Team	June 9, 2022	20	Digital exclusive released for free on D&D Beyond.
Spelljammer Academy	Chris Lindsay, Chris Tulach, Travis Woodall, Will Doyle, Rich Lescouflair, Gabrielle Harbowy, Christopher Perkins	July 11, 2022 – August 2022	1-5	Prequel adventure module for the boxed set Spelljammer: Adventures in Space released for free on D&D Beyond exclusively. The adventure module was released in four parts from July to August 2022: Orientation, Trial by Fire, Realmspace Sortie!, and Behold... H'Catha.
Monstrous Compendium Vol 2: Dragonlance Creatures	F. Wesley Schneider, Makenzie De Armas, Ron Lundeen, Jeremy Crawford	December 5, 2022	—N/a	Digital exclusive released for free on D&D Beyond.
Thieves' Gallery	Jeremy Jarvis, Christopher Perkins	March 6, 2023	—N/a	Stat blocks for the main characters of the film Dungeons & Dragons: Honor Among Thieves released exclusively on D&D Beyond for free.
Monstrous Compendium Vol 3: Minecraft Creatures	Christopher Perkins	March 28, 2023	—N/a	Digital exclusive released for free on D&D Beyond to promote the Dungeons & Dragons DLC for Minecraft.
Legendary Magic Items	Jeremy Jarvis, Christopher Perkins	March 31, 2023	—N/a	Digital exclusive released for free on D&D Beyond featuring magic items from Honor Among Thieves.
Misplaced Monsters: Volume One		May 2, 2023	—N/a	Proceeds are donated to Extra Life fundraiser.
Baldur's Gate Gazetteer		August 22, 2023	—N/a	Originally appeared as a chapter in Baldur's Gate: Descent into Avernus. The gazetteer was released for free as a standalone product on D&D Beyond following the release of the video game Baldur's Gate 3.
Monstrous Compendium Vol 4: Eldraine Creatures	James Wyatt, Jeremy Crawford, Ron Lundeen, Ben Petrisor	September 21, 2023	—N/a	Digital exclusive on D&D Beyond which features "creatures from Eldraine, the Magic: The Gathering plane recently featured in the Wilds of Eldraine set".
Lightning Keep	Christopher Perkins	September 26, 2023	3	Digital exclusive adventure module released for free on D&D Beyond which features monsters from Monstrous Compendium Volume 3: Minecraft Creatures.
Adventure Atlas: The Mortuary	Justice Ramin Arman, Makenzie De Armas, Carl Sibley	October 17, 2023	3-11	Digital exclusive on D&D Beyond which features encounters and monsters for characters in the Mortuary location of Planescape.
Heroes' Feast: Saving the Children's Menu	Deborah Ann Woll, Jason Tondro, Kate Welch	November 21, 2023	10	Digital exclusive adventure module on D&D Beyond to promote Heroes' Feast Flavors of the Multiverse: An Official D&D Cookbook. It also includes a recipe from the cookbook.
Dungeons & Dragons: Red Dragon's Tale	Kyle Brink, Christopher Perkins	April 2, 2024	5	A 20-page adventure module released for free as a PDF on D&D Beyond which corresponds with the Red Dragon's Tale Lego set. The Lego set is designed to be built as the players progress through the module. The module includes rules for running it with the 5th Edition ruleset or without the ruleset.
Vecna: Nest of the Eldritch Eye	Christopher Perkins, Makenzie De Armas, Ron Lundeen, Fury Galuzzi	April 16, 2024	3-4	Prequel one-shot adventure released as a digital exclusive incentive for pre-ordering the adventure module Vecna: Eve of Ruin (May 2024) on D&D Beyond.
Astarion's Book of Hungers	Amanda Hamon, Ron Lundeen, Stephen Rooney, Sarra Scherb	November 11, 2025	3, 12	Digital exclusive which is part one of the "Forgotten Realms Ultimate Bundle"; features vampire themed player options and adventures.
Netheril's Fall	Amanda Hamon, Ron Lundeen, David Somerville	November 18, 2025	3, 8	Digital exclusive which is part two of the "Forgotten Realms Ultimate Bundle"; features a time-traveling adventure.
Lorwyn: First Light	Amanda Hamon, Patrick Renie, Michael Zhang, Hans Ziegler	November 25, 2025	—N/a	Digital exclusive which is part three of the "Forgotten Realms Ultimate Bundle". Features the Magic: The Gathering planes of Lorwyn and Shadowmoor along with themed player options.
Project_Lamordia	Patrick Renie, Joey Haeck, F. Wesley Schneider	October 13, 2026	1-5	Digital exclusive on D&D Beyond which showcases a reimagined Lamordia; this iteration of the Ravenloft domain is modern techno-horror and features the Darklord Viktra Mordenheim as the CEO of Mordenheim Kinetics. It includes three adventures as well as reflavored player options from Ravenloft: The Horrors Within (2026).

=== Third-party releases ===
In August 2023, D&D Beyond released the Tal'Dorei Campaign Setting Reborn sourcebook by publisher Darrington Press; this was the first third-party product released for sale on the platform. Linda Codega of Gizmodo commented that "it'd make sense that if Beyond is being opened up in a limited capacity, someone as massively intrinsically successful to D&D as a brand like Critical Role comes first. Although there has been no information given about this release, the license used, or how the money will be distributed, it's hard to exactly say whether or not Wizards of the Coast receives a good chunk of change out of its arrival on Beyond".

In November 2023, Grim Hollow: Lairs of Etharis by Australian publisher Ghostfire Gaming was released on D&D Beyond. A second sourcebook, the adventure module Dungeons of Drakkenheim, by Ghostfire Gaming was released in December 2023; this module was designed by Monty Martin and Kelly McLaughlin of the Dungeon Dudes channel and features the world of their actual play campaign. Wizards has since announced additional partnerships for their D&D Beyond marketplace with third-party publishers such as Free League Publishing, Kobold Press, Hit Point Press, MCDM and The Griffon's Saddlebags.

== Platforms ==
D&D Beyond content and character management system is primarily browser-based, and is fully functional on both mobile and desktop browsers. DDB's website is continually updated, based largely on input from users throughout the community. On March 4, 2018, D&D Beyond's mobile app was first released into beta testing, focused on providing an e-reader for official Dungeons & Dragons content. The app allows compendium content for Dungeons & Dragons to be downloaded for offline use. Some users had criticized the app's lack of a character sheet or builder, which was one of the main offerings of D&D Beyond; however, DDB disclosed that character management functionality was planned.

In a D&D Beyond development update stream on October 31, 2019, Adam Bradford discussed DDB's plans to develop two additional mobile apps focused on the player experience and the Dungeon Master experience respectively; he explained that character management functionality would be included in this new player app, leaving the existing mobile app as a reader for compendium content. In March 2020, D&D Beyond opened up limited alpha testing for this player app to those current subscribers who signed up, and the alpha test began the following month.

=== Maps ===
In September 2023, D&D Beyond launched an alpha test of their 2D virtual tabletop (VTT) called Maps. Access was limited to subscribers at the Master tier, however, these users can invite any D&D Beyond user to their Maps hosted campaigns. The alpha iteration of Maps includes generic maps, maps from sourcebooks purchased by the user and maps uploaded by the user along with tokens and an optional "fog of war" effect. The game log for Maps also tracks rolls made on character sheets, with the encounter tool and with the Discord Avrae bot when they are linked to the campaign.

D&D Beyond then released Maps for all registered users in September 2025; this gives registered users access to "owned maps, modules, and adventures" within Maps along with hosting and other basic features. However, "many customization features for DMs will still be paywalled behind a Master Tier subscription". In 2026, D&D Beyond added integrated character sheets and a campaign journal which can be accessed within Maps.

=== Sigil ===
Wizards of the Coast's standalone 3D VTT, code name Project Sigil, was designed to have D&D Beyond integration where users can use their D&D Beyond characters within the VTT. In 2024, it was announced that the VTT would be a free-to-play PC application that does not require a D&D Beyond account, however, "D&D Beyond subscribers" would "have more access" within the VTT application. A closed beta for D&D Beyond users occurred in 2024. When asked about the VTT's monetization model in August 2024, co-creator Chris Cao stated:

I understand it's very confusing that we're using Unreal 5 to make a toy game. But it's just D&D, and we know for sure it's got to be free. We know for sure there's a subscription part to this that offers you more, and we know we want to sell things. But the term microtransactions can get really iffy because it has to be based on what players actually want to use. I have a feeling that this is going to be a way to play D&D that has its own value center.

Sigil launched in March 2025 as a feature for D&D Beyond users. The free tier allowed users to play single-player, join games, and experience the introduction adventure, but limited multiplayer hosting, map editing, and mini options. Upgrading to the D&D Beyond Master Tier granted hosting privileges, unlimited map saves, more mini options, custom outfits, and additional map builder kits. However, reviewers noted it launched missing key features.

Later that month, senior game rules specialist Andy Collin announced on social media that roughly thirty "developers (90% of the team)", including himself, "were laid off from the Sigil team at Wizards of the Coast". An internal communication on the layoffs, attributed to Dungeons & Dragons and Hasbro Direct senior vice president Dan Rawson, stated "our aspirations for Sigil as a large, standalone game with a distinct monetization path will not be realized" and that they "will transition Sigil to a DDB feature". Rascal reported that "the atmosphere surrounding work on Sigil had felt off and increasingly strained since late last year, following a disastrous Gen Con 2024 tech demo". Rascal noted sources described "a company-wide lack of coordination" and "a lack of corporate leadership" that hindered the project's development, as the Sigil team "never interacted with the book publishing team" and "stumbled into" D&D Beyond's Maps VTT playtest; additionally, an employee claimed Wizards of the Coast engineers "constantly clashed with D&D Beyond staff over access" to internal data. There was also "a lack of interest from Hasbro management" and Hasbro "at no point cared to understand the difference" between a VTT and a video game, especially in terms of revenue potential. In October 2025, D&D Beyond announced that it would sunset Sigil with its servers shutting down at the end of October 2026. Content created by users "within Sigil will no longer be accessible".

== Pricing ==
D&D Beyond derives its income from digital content purchases, subscriptions, and advertising. Its tools are generally free to use, though some require an account (which can be made for free); however, viewing the full details of content from the official Dungeons & Dragons fifth edition books requires owning that content on D&D Beyond or having it shared with you. This content can be bought as a one-time purchase; buying a subscription does not grant access to any content. The Verge highlighted that the acquisition by Hasbro "shifts D&D Beyond from a royalty-based revenue source for Wizards of the Coast to in-house development".

=== Content purchases ===
At launch, the price of source books was $29.99 and the price of adventure modules was $24.99. Initially in D&D Beyond's Marketplace, customers could either purchase a book as a whole – including both compendium content and access to that content in the rest of the toolset – or purchase individual portions of that book separately (getting just the compendium content, or just the individual spells or subclasses that they want to use in the character builder, for instance). If portions of a book were purchased à la carte, then if the customer decided to purchase the full book later, the price of that book was discounted by the cost they have already paid for content from the book. In April 2024, the à la carte option was removed from the marketplace.

D&D Beyond offered 3 bundles of books: the Sourcebook Bundle, the Adventure Bundle, and the Legendary Bundle. The Sourcebook Bundle included all released official source books for Dungeons & Dragons fifth edition, and granted a permanent 10% discount on all future sourcebook purchases on DDB; the Adventure Bundle did the same for official adventure books. The Legendary Bundle included all released official Dungeons & Dragons fifth edition books of both kinds, and granted a 15% discount on all future source book and adventure purchases. At launch, the Legendary Bundle (which included five source books and eight adventure modules) was $279.99. By March 2020, the Legendary Bundle cost had increased to $637.19 and included access to "more than 30 titles in all". This was later changed to US$955.86 and included 44 books in January 2023. The price of each bundle is determined by simply adding the current price of all books in the bundle, then subtracting the cost the customer has previously paid for books in that bundle that they already own. These bundles are updated with each new official release.

=== Subscriptions ===
Most of D&D Beyond's functionality is free to use, other than the content purchases needed to view non-free content from the official Dungeons & Dragons fifth edition books. However, D&D Beyond offers two subscription levels, Hero Tier and Master Tier, that expand the site's functionality.

The Hero Tier subscription grants a number of benefits. The site normally features ads, and the character builder limits free users to 6 active characters at any given time. However, the Hero Tier subscription removes ads, and allows users to create an unlimited number of characters. In addition, while homebrew content that users choose to publish on the site is free to view for anyone (even without an account), the Hero Tier subscription allows users to add published homebrew content to their collection; this content can then be used in the rest of the toolset, including the character builder. Finally, this tier grants early access to some new tools as they are developed. For instance, before it was made available to everyone, the encounter builder went through an alpha testing phase, during which Hero and Master Tier subscribers could make use of it and provide feedback to help identify bugs and guide future development.

The Master Tier subscription primarily allows the user to share their purchased content with others in a campaign group with them on D&D Beyond, in addition to all the benefits of the Hero Tier subscription. Though private homebrew content is automatically shared without a subscription, published homebrew content and official content requires a Master Tier subscription to be shared. With a Master Tier subscription, the user can enable content sharing for up to 3 campaigns they are in of up to 12 players each (as well as the Dungeon Master of each campaign). If content sharing is enabled, any official content owned by any of the players or the Dungeon Master (DM), as well as any published homebrew content in any of their collections, is shared with the other members of the group. As of August 2019, the DM of a campaign group can enable or disable the sharing of compendium content from each specific book with players that do not own that content; more specific shared content management options are planned for the future.

== Reception ==
Cecilia D'Anastasio, for Kotaku in 2017, wrote "when viewed as a toolset and not a replacement for D&D's traditions, D&D Beyond is exactly the sort of digital facelift the game needs to stay accessible, streamlined and relevant". D'Anastasio highlighted one downside, which was that content from the DMs Guild is not automatically integrated with D&D Beyond. Gavin Sheehan, for Bleeding Cool in 2017, commented that he "loved D&D Beyond" and that "It was interesting to scan through these digital versions and compare them to the physical ones as I thumbed through the pages. There's nothing missing here, and if anything, the people behind the program went to great lengths to make sure this was easy to read and apply to the physical world". He also praised the ability to make homebrew content in D&D Beyond.

Alex Walker, for Kotaku Australia in 2019, reported that two years after launch the D&D Beyond mobile app would be updated to include the ability to load character sheets. Walker highlighted that this was a highly requested feature from the launch of D&D Beyond; Walker criticized the delay in adding the feature especially as other versions of mobile character sheets had been done before effectively. Adam Benjamin, for CNET in February 2023, stated that "of the tools we tested, D&D Beyond was far and away the simplest to get started with". He commented that "the primary drawback of D&D Beyond is that it focuses on character sheets, not other elements of a D&D table" – for groups dependent on maps to "visualize combat and exploration", they'll need to use a virtual tabletop (such as Roll20 or Fantasy Grounds) or other map tools in addition to D&D Beyond. In a 2024 review update, Benjamin highlighted that the in-development map tool "addresses a major gap in D&D Beyond's service" but other VTTs still "offer more robust map features".

Gus Wezerek, for FiveThirtyEight, reported that of the 5th edition class and race combinations per 100,000 characters that players created on D&D Beyond from August 15 to September 15, 2017, fighters were the most popular with 13,906 characters created, followed by rogues (11,307) and wizards (9,855). Druids were the least popular, with 6,328 characters created. Wezerek wrote: "when I started playing 'Dungeons & Dragons' five years ago, I never would have chosen the game's most popular match: the human fighter. There are already enough human fighters in movies, TV and books — my first character was an albino dragonborn sorcerer. But these days I can get behind the combo's simplicity".

On the May 2022 announcement of sourcebook delisting, Christian Hoffer, for ComicBook.com, commented that "one major concern about the delisting is access to the chapters of lores contained in Volo's Guide to Monsters and Mordenkainen's Tome of Foes. Both books contained dozens of pages of lore about the D&D multiverse that don't appear in Monsters of the Multiverse. [...] D&D Beyond has not said whether the various expanded lore chapters will be available to D&D Beyond players moving forward, or if they'll be delisted and essentially removed from access by new players moving forward. Of course, D&D players can still read the lore in Volo's Guide to Monsters and Mordenkainen's Tome of Foes by purchasing physical copies of the books, which will still be available even after Monsters of the Multiverse is released next week".

=== Pricing ===
While Gavin Sheehan of Bleeding Cool believed the digital resources were worth the cost in 2017, he wrote that "the pricing will be the real dividing point for some people. [...] I can see people screaming that they don't get to own the material like you would a book". Charlie Hall, for Polygon, reported that in March 2020 the cost of D&D Beyond's Legendary Bundle was $637.19. He highlighted that the cost of the digital Dungeons & Dragons source books and adventure modules are about the same as the physical books, and that "many players are still defaulting to physical books". Hall viewed D&D Beyond as a luxury app and that he is "not eager to effectively buy the same content twice".

Adam Benjamin, for CNET in February 2023, opined that "a Hero tier subscription isn't great value unless you play in a lot of D&D groups (more than six). The real value of a subscription is sharing content with the Master Tier. ... A DM with a Master-tier subscription can spend $6 per month and share purchased content with the rest of the group even if they have free accounts". Lee D'Amato of Screen Rant and Christian Hoffer of ComicBook.com both criticized the decision to remove à la carte pricing from D&D Beyond in 2024. Hoffer called removing the ability to purchase character options individually an "awful move" as many sourcebooks are geared towards dungeon masters with only a "handful of items for players". D'Amato opined that it was "incredibly unfair to players" as "players now have to choose between limiting their options and spending tons of money" instead of "inexpensively" creating characters "a few dollars a pop". D'Amato also viewed the change as a potential barrier to entry for new players as "prospective players who aren't even sure if they like DnD yet will be even more reluctant to explore the wide variety of character options available if they need to spend so much money to see them".

=== Revised 5E (2024) implementation ===
Matt Bassil, for Wargamer, highlighted the "fairly mixed reception" to the August 2024 update announcement on social media. Christian Hoffer, for ComicBook.com, commented that "many D&D Beyond users are expressing their displeasure about having a portion of the 2024 rules 'forced' on them with no way to opt out" with "long threads complaining about the changes" and that the proposed homebrew solution with manual input has "generally not been received well by players". Charlie Hall of Polygon criticized the "borderline Byzantine set of steps required to keep characters based on the 10-year-old version of the game rules running perfectly inside the modern, web-based app". Hall viewed the need for the user "to re-build some 2014-era spells and magic items" to work within the updated character sheet as the "most egregious" aspect of the change. He foresaw "the biggest problem" being that "there will suddenly be the assumption that players who cut their teeth on the 2014 rules will need to understand the 2024 rules revision in order to get the most use out of the D&D Beyond platform at the table". Bassil thought it was "a bummer for anyone currently playing a 5e DnD campaign through Beyond that didn't intend to switch". He commented that users will still be able to access their copies of older sourcebooks "so it's not that this content will be completely inaccessible through the platform – it'll just be harder to use". J.R. Zambrano of Bell of Lost Souls also highlighted that "the old rules will still be there" in the compendium. Zambrano explained that a significant part of the "rules references will reflect the new stuff" and when "clicking on a condition", "the 2024 version of the condition" will appear instead of the 2014 version. He commented that while much of it is "minor changes", these are still changes "to the functional part of the website that you'll use when playing".

Ash Parrish of The Verge commented that the original announced changes to functionality meant some D&D Beyond users "spent the last 72 hours in a state of panic" but a "weekend of backlash on social media" led Wizards of the Coast to adjust their rollout by "simply adding the new content and giving players the choice to opt in". James Whitbrook of Gizmodo opined "it's good that Wizards learned the lesson relatively quickly this time" following fan pushback as opposed to how "it initially handled the backlash against its planned changes to the Open Game License last year". Whitbrook thought it was "kind of wild" that they didn't foresee any issues with shifting the "onus" onto players "to make the intended compatibility smooth" especially as the updated edition of Dungeons & Dragons "wants to treat itself more like a living game than ever before–where its ruleset can be regularly tweaked and updated as necessary–while also maintaining a level of continuity with players still using the Fifth Edition rules they've had over the course of D&D's massive popularity boom in the last 10 years".

Lin Codega, now for Rascal, explained that the backlash was an indication of an edition war that "Wizards of the Coast has been trying to avoid at all costs" – in an attempt maintain the game as 5th Edition, Wizards has been advertising how the changes will be a backwards compatible update and not a new edition of Dungeons & Dragons. Codega opined that this "game design ethos" led D&D Beyond to ask "users to re-engineer backwards compatible game functionality" when the "transition should have been seamless for the user" and by fumbling this, Wizards has engendered "the edition wars discourse they so desperately wanted to avoid". They commented that updates either "functionally matter (which would support the production and need for a new edition) or they functionally don't (which means that there is no need for them to change at all)" and there's a question on if "this is a new edition or it is errata. The books say it's the former; the digital tools say the latter". Codega highlighted that the "backlash to D&D Beyond's update" is a potential indication that the marketing strategy to maintain 5th Edition in such a way "to entice both old and new players" might not be working.

=== Virtual tabletops ===
In a 2025 review of the Sigil VTT, Sam Machkovech of Polygon highlighted that it launched with incomplete features, noting that the platform's "inconsistencies can make combat a bit of a circus". Machkovech felt "its general management of stats, abilities, and math is too variable and untrustworthy". He commented that Sigil is "competing against a second internally produced virtual tabletop called Maps" which is available to D&D Beyond subscribers and was "spooked by Sigil's unceremonious dumping into the D&D Beyond subscription service in its current state, along with release notes that suggest missing features may never be addressed". Benjamin Abbott of GamesRadar+ opined "the functionality in what may as well be an alpha version of the software is impressive (if we're at that level already, imagine what it'll be like a couple of years from now). It's downright beautiful as well, and has a suite of content no other virtual tabletop has tried to combine". Abbott noted that he was "gutted" to highlight the missing features as Sigil's launch made him "feel like I've arrived too early – like I've peeked at my Christmas presents before the big day".

Ben Brosofsky of Screen Rant commented that Sigil at launch felt like an "alpha release" and similarly highlighted the missing features, noting that the VTT is not "great at communicating which features are available or unavailable". Brosofsky opined that "as a primary solution for playing Dungeons & Dragons online, Sigil has a long way to go if it wants to compete with the comprehensive use cases of alternative VTTs". Harvey Randall of PC Gamer argued that the handling of Sigil by Hasbro is part of a larger pattern where it appears the company "barely understands its own product, doesn't really care to, and is growing increasingly impatient with its inability to turn [Dungeons & Dragons] into a Magic: The Gathering", noting that Hasbro bought D&D Beyond "years after it became popular, and is now struggling to become a more fully-featured VTT". Randall commented that "Sigil, its first real, big-name attempt to do something new, is dead in the water before it even started swimming", adding that the VTT is "not going to be the next big thing, and it might not even be a 'thing' at all". He noted that Sigil entered playtesting "with a whimper, didn't quite work, and then Hasbro" laid off 90% of the team behind it.

Following the announced shutdown of Sigil, Lin Codega of Rascal commented that similar to how D&D Beyond "has attempted to create a purely digital library and play area, Sigil's entire purpose was in service of the removal of the theater of the mind" playstyle. Abbott stated that he "always felt as though the pitch was obvious" as it "should have been a 3D version of the current 'Maps' toolset with some basic effects, miniatures, a Baldur's Gate 3-style HUD for easy access to your actions, and integration with D&D Beyond". Abbott commented that he was "disappointed" even though "the writing's been on the wall since" the layoffs in March 2025. Similarly, Amanda Kay Oaks of ComicBook.com stated that it is "safe to say no one is surprised to see Sigil shutting down" and "most D&D fans haven’t really expressed much surprise or disappointment". Codega opined that while it "was an ambitious project, carried by a talented team", the project's leadership was made up of "video game executives that never quite seemed to grasp exactly what people love about playing tabletop games. So ends an embarrassing experiment in microtransactions, over-design, and consistently poor planning. The only reminders of the program will be gilded character sheets and digital dice in D&D Beyond – fitting that kitschy advertisements and add-ons meant to entice Sigil to the D&D masses will be its grave marker". Kay Oaks commented that "in a market with plenty of excellent 3rd party virtual tabletops, Sigil didn't feel like it offered anything players hadn't already found elsewhere". Abbott wrote it was "hand-wringingly frustrating", noting that "Sigil had the potential to be a game-changing experience, yet it struggled with its identity, and I don't know why. Messaging was confused in the run-up to launch, and nobody seemed to have a firm grasp of what it was meant to do".

In May 2026, Denny Connolly of Vice praised the Maps tool, highlighting that it "has made some incredible improvements to communication, transparency, and overall functionality over the last year". Connolly noted that while it does not have the same deep functionality of "VTTs like Roll20 or Foundry", the Maps tool is "definitely moving in the right direction". He noted that it has "become a great low-cost and no-fuss option for players who prefer a lightweight tool with a very low barrier to entry". In light of the short-lived Sigil, Connolly wrote that it is "exciting to see Maps take a different approach and really make meaningful small, but frequent steps to respond to player feedback and incorporate new features".

== See also ==
- Fantasy Grounds
- Foundry VTT
- Roll20
