= D&D Insider =

Subscription service

- A screenshot of selecting a class in the Character Builder from November 2010.
- Original author: Wizards of the Coast
- Release: 2008
- Written in: .Net 3.5 SP 1
- Platform: DirectX; Microsoft Silverlight
- Successor: D&D Beyond
- Type: Role-playing game accessory and content distribution
- Website: Archived February 1, 2012, at the Wayback Machine

D&D Insider (DDI) was Wizards of the Coast's subscription method of digitally delivering periodic content, information, and online tools for the 4th Edition of Dungeons & Dragons to the game's players from 2008 to 2014. The service officially shut down in 2020.

== History ==
=== Origins and launch ===
Shannon Appelcline, in the book Designers & Dragons (2014), stated that in 2005 Hasbro decided all of its core brands "needed to earn at least $50 million dollars a year" which would be a struggle for the Dungeons & Dragons brand, as it "was probably grossing just $25 or $30 million at the time — in large part because" subsidiary Wizards of the Coast didn't have the computer game rights for the brand. Brands that didn't meet the minimum to be a core brand would not receive good support for expansion and development. This led Wizards of the Coast to launch a digital initiative, initially presented to Hasbro in 2006, where the next edition of the game would "be created with the specific intent of integrating it with an online service that would include a virtual tabletop for play". If Wizards could "convert a fraction of D&D's players to paying online subscribers", then Dungeons & Dragons "would hit its $50 million dollar goal" and become a core brand. Wizards of the Coast developed D&D Insider and Gleemax, a community hub and launcher for all of Wizards of the Coast's games, as the two digital aspects of this initiative.

D&D Insider was announced at the August 2007 Gen Con as a subscription-based electronic supplement to the upcoming 4th Edition of Dungeons & Dragons. The demo included a short video of a virtual "dungeon" (called the Game Table) in which some D&D adventures take place, containing virtual miniatures based on player characters created in the Character Visualizer (a 3D full-body portrait program). Randy Buehler, vice-president of digital gaming at Wizards of the Coast in 2008, told BBC News that "if we want to recruit the next generation of gamers we have to be online, that's clearly the platform where people have chosen to play. [...] The idea is that you can play it as 100% table-top experience, or 100% electronic or somewhere in between".

DDI officially launched in 2008 with the start of the new edition. However, it was launched without the advertised virtual tabletop (VTT) component and other digital toolsets. While it was also announced in 2007, many features for Gleemax were delayed before it was cancelled in July 2008.

=== Expansion of toolsets ===
D&D Insider screenshots

Monster Builder at launch in 2011.

Virtual Table beta in 2012.

DDI launched their subscription service in October 2008 which initially included articles, archived Dragon and Dungeon web content, and a compendium of rules elements for the 4th edition of Dungeons & Dragons. Appelcline commented that Wizards of the Coast's roleplaying group had issues with the D&D Insider Compendium as the sentiment was "it took all of their core book material and gave it away online". The money from user subscriptions initially went to "the digital group, not the roleplaying group, causing problems within Hasbro's bureaucracy. As a result, the RPG division had to take over Insider, but still found themselves supporting a product that they weren't sure was in their best interests". Additionally, a consolidation of digital initiatives by Wizards of the Coast led to layoffs of members in the digital group in December 2008. This included Buehler along with Andrew Finch (Director of Digital Games), William Meyers (Creative Manager of Digital Design) and Jennifer Paige (Online Community Manager).

In February 2009, the Character Builder was launched and required downloading an application limited to Windows machines. After November 2010, the Character Builder become browser based and required Microsoft Silverlight. The Character Builder only supported official Wizards of the Coast content. In January 2011, DDI removed the option of downloading the Dragon and Dungeon magazines as formatted PDFs. A Monster Builder (as part of the Adventure Tools suite) was also released in 2011. While the VTT went into beta-testing for DDI subscribers in 2010, the VTT was officially canceled in 2012.

Mike Mearls, in a January 2012 interview on the next edition of Dungeons & Dragons, stated that they planned "to continue offering people access to tools like the D&D: Character Builder and the D&D: Monster Builder to support 4th edition". In 2014, the service was discontinued. A subscription renewal email from Wizards of the Coast indicated that the DDI subscription would no longer include new issues of Dragon and Dungeon magazines (only archives), and the online resources would no longer be actively supported. While existing subscribers could renew the service, DDI stopped accepting new subscribers. The service was officially shutdown on January 1, 2020 due to Microsoft Silverlight no longer being supported.

== Reception ==
Michael Zenke, for Wired in June 2008, described DDI as a "storehouse of knowledge for players and dungeon masters". Zenke highlighted that the subscription cost at launch was roughly the same cost as previous subscription costs to print magazines Dungeon and Dragon so DDI was "great value for the money" since it included both the electronic editions of the magazines along with other online tools. However, Zenke also felt that "for a hobby that has (despite the high prices of the actual D&D books) mostly been a fairly cheap pastime, D&DI's pricing is tantamount to highway robbery" as every player in a group would need to pay to access the online services. The other major problem for Zenke was that DDI launched without the "D&D Game Table" component. Zenke thought DDI "should be a tremendous service" as no VTT product had "this level of sophistication" before and no other product had ever "been tied into the core game the way D&DI is, nor coupled with the Dungeon and Dragon magazines – respected publications with a long history of serving the D&D community".

Matt Forbeck, for Escapist Magazine in December 2009, highlighted DDI's Character Builder – "it made character creation a snap by leading me through it by the nose and not making it easy for me to proceed until I'd completed any necessary steps first. It automatically added up all of the various modifiers for every skill, and it helped the kids pick their skills, feats, and equipment much faster than we could possibly have managed by hand". He commented that "best of all" these character sheets could be printed "along with a set of cards representing every one of the character's powers". Forbeck stated that he "can't recommend DDI highly enough" and the first three levels of character creation are "free to use [...] so give it a try". Greg Tito, for Escapist Magazine in December 2011, commented that "moving its periodic content to a digital portal called D&D Insider on a monthly subscription model, while providing access to online tools like the handy Character Builder seems to be successful (Again, without any sales numbers it is hard to gauge, but anecdotally most people who play 4th Edition use D&D Insider in some capacity.)".

In January 2012, following the announcement that the next edition was in development, MJ Harnish of Wired commented that "Wizards of the Coast has had a great deal of difficulty delivering on what they have promised. The online software tools have regularly gone months without updates, the online 'magazines' have been up and down in quality. It's unclear what will become of the much anticipated VTT, which is still in beta testing after years of delay, now that a new edition is underway. It's not hard to imagine that the 4E fans who have been waiting more than three years to play their favorite version of D&D online are out of time and thus out of luck".

Shannon Appelcline, in his book Designers & Dragons (2014), commented that the rough launch of D&D Insider hurt it with its fanbase and many promised aspects never materialized. Appelcline also highlighted that many fans felt the switch from downloadable content to browser-only content was designed to force continuous DDI subscriptions. He characterized DDI as a success, however, "probably not what Wizards had hoped" especially as "it only reflected about a quarter of the increase that Hasbro needed to turn D&D into a core brand".

Academic Nicholas J. Mizer in his book Tabletop Role-Playing Games and the Experience of Imagined Worlds (2019) characterized D&D Insider as a way for Wizards of the Coast to maintain control over Dungeons & Dragons and shift the game towards producing a predictable McDonaldized product. Mizer wrote:

If Wizards can succeed at convincing players that D&DI is convenient [...], they need not necessarily convince them that the content provided is better. [...] If Wizards wants to change a rule, they do not need to convince players to change the way they play, they simply update the entry in the database. Everyone subscribing to the service will see the new rule as written the next time they access the database. [...] Players can theoretically develop customized, homebrewed characters and rules, but once they have bought into the McDonaldized system, they often find it too inconvenient. Wizards even provides the extra-convenient "Choose for me" button every step of the way for the player who is overwhelmed by the pre-cooked options presented to them.

== Legacy ==
In 2014, the 5th Edition of Dungeons & Dragons was released. DDI did not support this edition. In 2017, Wizards of the Coast announced a similar online toolset for 5th Edition dubbed D&D Beyond. After the announcement of D&D Beyond, Charlie Hall of Polygon stated that 4th Edition's DDI "included a very useful character builder, which drew from every available D&D sourcebook and would output a usable character sheet" along with a "rules compendium", an "encounter generator" and a "Monster Builder" which "allowed DMs to add templates to existing monsters on the fly, flavoring them to meet their needs at the table". Hall commented that "D&D Insider was unfortunately built on Microsoft's Silverlight platform, and failed to make the transition to mobile platforms like Apple's iOS and Google's Android". Hall highlighted that other online "toolsets grew up alongside D&D Insider" – Fantasy Grounds and Roll20, "two of the most popular," were now "fully licensed by Wizards of the Coast".

Matthew Goldenberg, for TheGamer in July 2020, commented that 4th Edition was released at time when "massively multiplayer online games like World of Warcraft" were competing for the same playerbase. Goldenberg highlighted that in its campaign to stay competitive, Wizards of the Coast went forward with an "innovative suite of digital tools" to support the new edition – he called DDI's online character builder and virtual tabletop years ahead of its time. Goldenberg claimed that the "coup de grâce" to DDI was when its lead programmer committed a murder-suicide which led to 4th Edition fumbling.

In 2022, Wizards announced that a new virtual tabletop (VTT) for Dungeons & Dragons was in development. PCMag highlighted that DDI was Wizards' last "ill-fated" attempt at a VTT which was "ultimately scrapped". Kitty Leggett, for CBR in July 2023, highlighted that when 4th Edition launched people were dependent on physical sourcebooks to look material up as "commonplace smartphones were still a few years away". Leggett wrote, "while many 3.5 books were available in PDF format, 4e intended to offer much more [...] Unfortunately, D&D Insider would never quite live up to its initial claims. Between the system limitations of the time and the edition's rapidly fading popularity, many features in 4e's electronic supplements were canned altogether". On the new VTT, Leggett commented that it "seems to be what 4e originally was trying for and even comes with the ability to sync up with D&D Beyond for easy reference to character sheets and rules, all from the comfort of a phone, tablet, or PC".

== See also ==
- List of role-playing game software
