= Panic at the Dojo =

- Art by Vel Mini
- Designers: Vel Mini
- Illustrators: Maddi Gonzalez, H.P. Heisler, Crossy, Ziggy Cohen, Vel Mini
- Publishers: Itch.io, DriveThruRPG
- Publication: September 8, 2018; 8 years ago

Panic at the Dojo is a tabletop role-playing game system created by Vel Mini (Also known as Liberi Gothica Games), featuring the artists Maddi Gonzalez, H.P. Heisler, Crossy, Ziggy Cohen. It was a system released on September 8th, 2018 on the platforms itch.io for digital release with paperback and hardcover copies being available on DriveThruRPG. The goal when creating Panic! At the Dojo was to make a system based on action films and shows by the likes of people such as Jackie Chan. With it being compared to traditional fighting games such as Street Fighter or Fatal Fury.

== Gameplay ==
Panic at the Dojo lacks a lot of the traditional role-play elements not found find in an average tabletop role-playing game; because of this it focuses on its combat elements. Due to its unique combat, users can't fail a roll. Rolling low only means users can do less in a turn, making them always feel useful despite luck not being in their favor.

== Development ==
Panic at the Dojo started as a crowdfunded tabletop role-playing game on Kickstarter, being first listed on October 21st, 2016. With it getting fully funded less than a month later on November 16th, 2016. The campaign lasted until November 21st, 2016. The campaign raised $6,620 from 213 backers, earning ten percent more than the goal of $6,000. Some of the tiers included hardcover copies of the book when it released, and at the highest tier, getting featured in the book as a boss with custom art for $250.
