= Tabletopia =

Gaming website

- Developer: Tabletopia Inc.
- Publisher: Tabletopia Inc.
- Designer: Tim Bokarev
- Artist: Andrey Shestakov
- Engine: Unity
- Platforms: Microsoft Windows, OS X, iOS, Android
- Release: December 1, 2016
- Genre: Tabletop game simulation
- Modes: Single-player, multiplayer

Tabletopia is an online portal for users to play and create virtual tabletop games. The platform is developed by Tabletopia Inc and initially was released as a web browser based service after a successful crowdfunding campaign in August 2015. In December 2016 Tabletopia was released on Steam, and later in 2018 became available in AppStore and Google Play.

== Gameplay ==
Tabletopia is a sandbox system for running any game. That means no AI or rules enforcement. Participating players will have to know how to play the game.

Nevertheless, the platform has some automated actions available, like card-shuffling and dealing, dice-rolling, magnetic placement of components in special zones, hand management, and some others. Tabletopia also features ready game setups for various player numbers to facilitate gameplay.

It also has customisable camera controls which let players save camera positions and switch between them using hot keys.

People can use the Game Designer mode to design and create their own board games using the component library. They can then monetise the games with a 70/30 split to the game designer.

== Development ==
Tabletopia was created in early 2014, by Tim Bokarev and his partners Artem Zinoviev and Dmitry Sergeev. These co-founders already had experience in the video and board games industry. Their other projects include Promo Interactive, an internet advertising agency, Playtox, a mobile MMORPG, Igrology, a game studio, and Tesera.ru, the main Russian-speaking board gaming portal.

By Spring 2014, Artem, Dmitry and Tim created Tabletopia Inc. USA and started development. Tabletopia is a multinational crew that includes professionals from USA, Ukraine, Australia, Ireland, and Germany.

The Kickstarter campaign in August 2015 earned $133,721 by 2,545 backers. Tabletopia received Green Light on Steam in September 2015 and was released on Steam in March 2016. The platform remained in Early Access until December 2016, when it was officially released on Steam and on the web. In February 2018 it was released as a stand-alone app for iOS tablets, and in September 2018 for Android tablets.
