= Foundry VTT =

Virtual tabletop RPG software

- Other names: Foundry VTT, FVTT
- Original author: Andrew Clayton ("Atropos")
- Developer: Foundry Gaming LLC
- Initial release: May 2020
- Stable release: v14.364 / June 10, 2026; 3 days ago
- Written in: JavaScript
- Operating system: Linux, Windows, macOS
- License: Proprietary
- Website: foundryvtt.com

Foundry Virtual Tabletop, commonly shortened to Foundry VTT or FVTT, is a commercial, self-hosted virtual tabletop application for role-playing games. It provides a stage for visualizing the game environment and tools allowing the game master and players to organize and track statistics and notes. The software is highly modular and depends on the community-maintained ecosystem of add-on modules that modify the software's behavior and implement different game systems. Perpetual licenses, which include updates, are offered for a one-time fee.

== Features ==
Foundry Virtual Tabletop is a highly modular Node.js web application that is run locally by the Gamemaster or hosted on a remote server. Players connect to their gamemaster's Foundry VTT instance over the network using their web browser.

It is system-agnostic in that its core feature-set is not restricted to a specific game system. Systems, specific features and game content are implemented as add-on modules, which can be individually downloaded from a public repository. The module repository contains paid, official content, as well as freely available community-made modules that enhance functionality of the software. As of May 2025, 350 individual game systems are implemented as modules.

Individual settings created by the Game Master are termed Worlds in the interface and contain the list of modules that should be loaded as well as world-specific content, which can be added by the gamemaster. This content is grouped into Scenes, Actors, Items and Journals.

Battle and world maps are created as Scenes, which contain the backdrop and data on placement of walls, light sources and other entities. Tokens representing Actors, which are player characters, vehicles or NPCs, can be placed on these Scenes to be moved by the user that owns them. Other entities that interact or integrate with actors are termed Items; these can be objects, but also game system-specific concepts such as character classes. Journals are text documents that can link to other entities present in the World or modules. Viewing and editing permissions can be set individually for each entity.

The software features a custom lighting engine that determines visibility of certain areas on each battle map depending on the position of players' characters, also revealing areas covered by fog of war. It also contains tools for map creation and comes with a small asset library.

== History ==
Foundry Gaming LLC founder Andrew Clayton, commonly known under his online nickname Atropos, began development of Foundry VTT in 2018 for personal use after becoming dissatisfied with the feature set and business models of other virtual tabletops.

Foundry VTT was initially developed for Linux, which remains its primary platform, with support for other platforms having been developed later.

Foundry Gaming LLC was incorporated in Spokane, Washington on October 9, 2018, with the software remaining in private beta-testing until May 2020, when it was publicly released.

In November 2020, Cubicle 7 partnered with Foundry to bring official content modules for its game system Warhammer Fantasy Roleplay to Foundry VTT. Later, in 2025, Clayton would state that this first major publisher deal was of significant importance to Foundry VTT's growth and credits the community developers of the WFRP system module for making it possible in the first place.

In November 2023, Paizo partnered with Foundry to bring official content modules for Pathfinder Roleplaying Game to Foundry VTT.

In January 2024, Foundry publicly announced its partnership with Wizards of the Coast in bringing official Dungeons & Dragons content to Foundry VTT, with the first official module, Phandelver and Below: The Shattered Obelisk, having been released in February 2024.

== Development ==
As of 2023, the Foundry VTT software itself is being developed and managed by a team of 9 people, while a content team of 12 people is working with partnered publishers to compile content into downloadable modules. The content team also develops in-house content published by Foundry Gaming LLC.

Stated goals are to create a virtual tabletop software that offers a one-time purchase and content ownership, make use of modern web technologies, and provide a platform for developers to build upon.

Clayton has stated that integration of Generative AI into Foundry VTT is not planned, citing ethical and legal concerns and calling its usage within the industry a "betrayal of the creative people who made the TTRPG industry what it is in the first place".

== Reception ==
Foundry VTT is one of the most popular virtual tabletops for TTRPGs; in particular, as a self-hosted web-based VTT, it is known as a modern alternative to the software as a service Roll20.

Wargamer named it one of the three "best virtual tabletops for D&D in 2023", noting its active community and high degree of technical complexity, which allows for customization not seen in other products at the cost of a much steeper learning curve. Comic Book Resources called it an "underrated gem" and "incredibly versatile" for similar reasons, while also praising its lighting engine and visual fidelity.

As the previously mentioned outlets do, Foundry's modular ecosystem and technical implementation are often mentioned as good features, but also as a source of frustration for new users.

In a video interview, Clayton acknowledges this issue and affirms that the development team intends to make usage of more technical features "friction-less" and will reduce module breakage between updates in the future.

== See also ==
- D&D Beyond
- Fantasy Grounds
