= Fantasy Grounds =

Virtual tabletop software for roleplaying games

Fantasy Grounds VTT
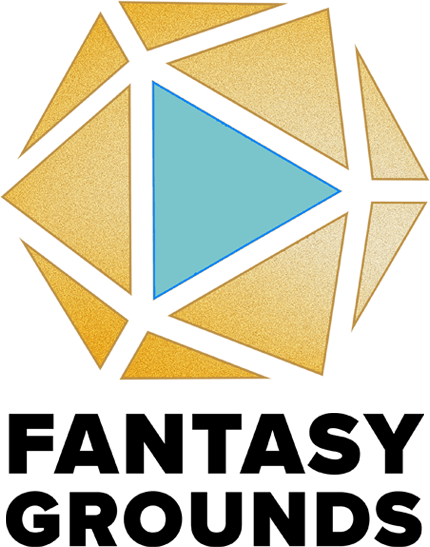

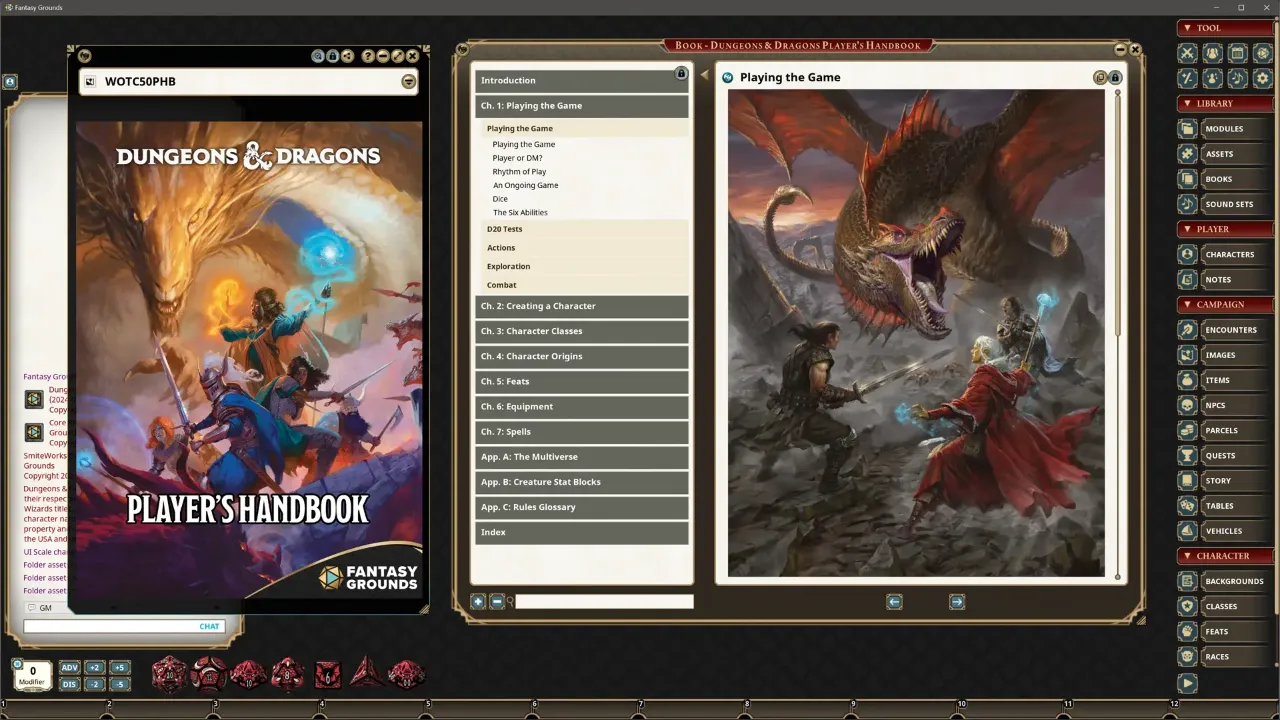
- Developers: SmiteWorks USA, LLC
- Initial release: 2004; 22 years ago
- Stable release: 4.1.17
- Operating system: Microsoft Windows, Mac OS X, Linux
- Available in: English
- Type: Virtual tabletop
- Website: www.fantasygrounds.com

Fantasy Grounds is a virtual tabletop application, which contains a set of tools to assist players of tabletop role-playing games playing either in person or remotely.

== History ==
Fantasy Grounds was first released in 2004 by SmiteWorks, originally based in Espoo, Finland. In 2009, the company was purchased by Doug Davison, after which it purchased licenses for content for several tabletop role-playing game systems. In April 2015, SmiteWorks acquired a license with Wizards of the Coast for official Dungeons & Dragons game content and began releasing products for the game's 5th edition on Fantasy Grounds; the same month, Fantasy Grounds became available to purchase through the Steam digital distribution platform. In December 2016, SmiteWorks obtained a license from Paizo Publishing for content from their Pathfinder Roleplaying Game, which was released on Fantasy Grounds starting in May 2017. In May 2019, Fantasy Grounds ran a successful Kickstarter campaign to fund Fantasy Grounds Unity, a new version of their software built in Unity.

In June 2024, it was announced that due to the acquisition of the digital tabletop role-playing toolset company Demiplane by the virtual tabletop company Roll20, D&D Beyond founder Adam Bradford would be leaving Demiplane. Bradford then announced that he would join SmiteWorks as their new Chief Development Officer.

In November 2025, it was announced that Smiteworks would make the Fantasy Grounds software free for all users without a need for a license. "“By removing the license barrier, we’re making Fantasy Grounds more accessible to the global tabletop gaming community,” said Doug Davison, President of SmiteWorks. “Whether you’re a veteran GM or a first-time player, we want everyone to experience how powerful and immersive virtual tabletop gaming can be – with zero upfront cost.”

== Features ==
Fantasy Grounds contains features typical of many tabletop role-playing games, such as virtual dice rolling, character sheets, and maps featuring line of sight with a grid system. Games are organized into sessions, which are started by a gamemaster and which other players may join remotely. Unlike many other virtual tabletop systems, the user interface of Fantasy Grounds is different depending on which game system is selected for the session through themes. Fantasy Grounds also contains various reference materials and rulebooks, as well as an integrated chat system. The program automates much of the dice rolling and other game systems, and allows the gamemaster to save a session to continue later.

Fantasy Grounds officially supports over 50 game systems with over 3,000 products, making it the largest digital catalog of officially-licensed content. In addition to various editions of Dungeons & Dragons and Pathfinder, support is offered for Savage Worlds, Call of Cthulhu, Traveller, Rolemaster, Castles & Crusades and many others. The Fantasy Grounds community has also created unofficial versions for many other systems, and players can also create fully custom rulesets, as well as extensions that customize the play experience.

== Reception ==
Fantasy Grounds is often praised by reviewers for its features and toolsets which allow players to fully customize their games. It is also considered one of the most reliable virtual tabletop programs. It was historically criticized for its complexity and cost, but SmiteWorks updated the pricing of the Core License to $20 and the Ultimate License to $50 in 2023 and introduced several user interface updates in 2024 to address those concerns. Then in November 2025, it was announced that Smiteworks would make the Fantasy Grounds software free for all users without a need for a license.

== See also ==
- D&D Beyond
- Roll20
- Foundry VTT
