= Catieosaurus =

American social media personality

- Osborn at Dragon Con in 2026
- Born: Catie Osborn
- Occupations: Author, tiktoker, speaker, podcast host, certified sex educator, and neurodivergent advocate
- Years active: 2020–present

TikTok information
- Page: catieosaurus
- Followers: 1.6 million

YouTube information
- Channel: Catieosaurus
- Subscribers: 78,000
- Views: 4.79 million
- Last updated: 17 August 2025
- Website: catieosaurus.com

Catie Osborn, known by the username Catieosaurus, is an American author, speaker, TikToker, actress, podcast host, sex educator, and mental health and disability advocate, based in Atlanta, Georgia. Much of her (Note: Osborn uses both she/her and they/them pronouns. This article uses the former for consistency and clarity.) work is on the topic of living with ADHD, particularly its impact on sexuality and relationships. Since joining TikTok in November 2020, she has acquired over one million followers Her social media presence also includes Twitter, YouTube, Twitch, and OnlyFans. Additionally she hosts the podcast Sorry, I Missed This: The Everything Guide to ADHD and Relationships with Cate Osborn produced by Understood.org, and co-hosts the podcast Catie and Erik's Infinite Quest with Erik Gude. Her commentary is known for focusing on the intersections of ADHD, neurodiversity, and kink.

== Career ==
=== Theatre and acting ===
Osborn attended Mary Baldwin University, where she received a Master of Fine Arts and a Master of Letters in Shakespeare and Performance. Her stage credits include Cressida/Hector in Troilus and Cressida and Puck in A Midsummer Night's Dream, both with the Compass Shakespeare Ensemble, and a 2015 Mary Baldwin production of Mary Zimmerman's Metamorphoses. Additionally, she worked for the Great River Shakespeare Festival as an education artist and graphic designer. Prior to her online career, Osborn was a professional stage manager and worked for a Shakespearean theatre company.

=== Social media ===
Osborn was laid off during the COVID-19 pandemic and joined TikTok in November 2020, encouraged by her younger sister and wanting something to pass the time. She began discussing her ADHD on the app out of frustration, feeling that existing content on the disorder did not reflect her own experiences and that its impact on sex, kink, and relationships was not being discussed.

In early 2021, Osborn participated in Ships of the Northern Fleet, a collaborative improv project with several other TikTokers surrounding a nonexistent steampunk sky pirate fantasy book and television series from the 2000s; within this metafiction, Osborn claimed to have played Annie Wreyburn, the show's bisexual lead character who was controversially killed off. TikTok users played along by creating a genuine fandom for the imaginary show. Additionally, Osborn and the other "cast members" held in-character Q&A livestreams on Twitch and YouTube.

== Personal life ==
Osborn is non-binary and uses she/her and they/them pronouns and the gender-neutral honorific Mx. She identifies as polyamorous, bisexual, pansexual and demi/greysexual. She is married and owns a pet dog named Bailey.

Osborn was diagnosed with ADHD the day before her 30th birthday. After having her left ovary removed due to an ovarian torsion, she experienced a hormonal imbalance that exacerbated her latent ADHD, severely impacting her memory and focus. Osborn initially believed she was experiencing early onset dementia until a friend with ADHD suggested she might have the disorder, prompting her to seek an evaluation. She has said that she "grew up my whole life believing I was broken and weird and wrong and everybody else had the memo and I didn’t".

In addition to ADHD, Osborn has myoclonic dystonia and experiences muscle spasms and chronic pain; she sees her BDSM work in part as taking charge of her chronic pain and ADHD. She also suffered from bulimia from the age of 15 until beginning therapy in her 30s, and has suggested that her ADHD symptoms of executive dysfunction and emotional dysregulation contributed to her disordered eating.
