= Digital tabletop game =

Video game genre

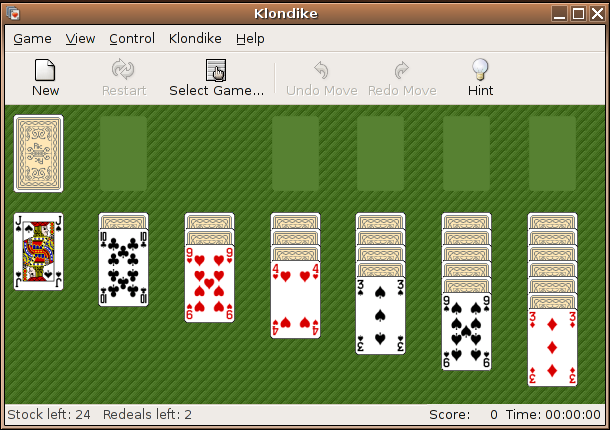
A digital version of Klondike (solitaire)

A digital tabletop game is a video game genre characterized by gameplay similar to physical tabletop games such as board games, card games, and role-playing games. Many digital tabletop games are adaptations of existing physical games, although some digital tabletop games were created only as video games. Players can also use tabletop game simulators to recreate tabletop games using various game pieces.

== Digital versions of physical games ==
Many digital tabletop games are virtual recreations of physical games, which can range from simple card games such as Microsoft Solitaire to complex tabletop role-playing games such as Gloomhaven. The digital versions typically support online multiplayer, as well as computer opponents for single players.

== Digital collectible card game ==
In digital variants of collectible card games (CCGs), players create decks of cards from their library to challenge opponents. In the 1990s, digital collectible card games (DCCGs) followed the popularity of games like Magic: The Gathering as a way to play online with other players. Although early DCCGs were reproductions of the physical version of a game, the release of Hearthstone in 2014 resulted in one of the first examples of a wholly digital CCG. Hearthstone led to a surge of new DCCGs, which includes both the recreation of existing CCGs and the development of new digital-only titles.

Most DCCGs are server-based games that retain the player's card library on the server. Players can create multiple decks to challenge computer opponents or online players. To expand their library, players can win games to earn booster packs or purchase additional cards through microtransactions.

== Video games emulating board games ==
Some video games incorporate board game principles into gameplay mechanics to emulate a board game experience. One notable example is the Mario Party series, in which players move around a game board based on roll results of one or more die, gaining or losing coins depending on where they land. Periodically, players participate in more action-based mini-games to earn bonus items towards winning the game.

== Virtual tabletops ==
Virtual tabletops (VTTs) or tabletop simulators are video game programs that allow users to recreate existing games or create their own games for online play, such as Tabletop Simulator and Tabletopia. The VTT or simulator typically provides a game engine with pre-made game assets like dice, tokens, and cards, often allowing players to create or import their own assets. The game may support limited scripting so that some tabletop game functions can be automated, but otherwise, players are expected to know and follow the rules, using the VTT primarily as a game board. This can create copyright concerns because art assets from published games can be distributed freely through user mods. Some tabletop game developers have embraced these programs by offering their games as official downloadable content for simulator programs.

There are a number of specialized virtual tabletop applications designed around role-playing games that provide character sheets, tokens, maps, and combat-related gameplay rulesets. These VTTs include standalone programs such as Fantasy Grounds and Foundry VTT, as well as web applications such as Roll20. D&D Beyond, the official digital toolset and game companion for the 5th Edition of Dungeons & Dragons, was developed through a partnership between Curse and Wizards of the Coast. In 2022, Wizards of the Coast's parent company Hasbro acquired D&D Beyond; the company is now developing a standalone VTT with D&D Beyond integration options, with the closed beta scheduled to launch in 2024. Wizards of the Coast previously attempted to develop a VTT for the 4th Edition of Dungeons & Dragons as part of their D&D Insider online tools. Although this VTT was in beta from 2010 to 2012, it was never fully launched.

== See also ==
- Toys-to-life
- Augmented reality
