= Wolves of Freeport =

Distributor of electronic books

Wolves of Freeport, Inc
- Formerly: OneBookShelf
- Type: E-commerce platform
- Industry: Collectible card games, role-playing games, comics, wargames
- Founded: 2006; 20 years ago in Georgia, U.S.
- Founders: James Mathe, Mike Todd, Chris McDonough and Steve Wieck
- Key people: Steve Wieck (President)
- Brands: DriveThruRPG; DriveThruComics; DriveThruFiction; DriveThruCards; Dungeon Masters Guild; Storytellers Vault; Wargame Vault; Pathfinder Infinite
- Subsidiaries: Roll20
- Website: https://www.onebookshelf.com/

Wolves of Freeport, Inc, formerly named OneBookShelf, Inc, is a digital marketplace company for both major and indie games, fiction and comics. In 2023, OneBookShelf combined with Roll20 which took over operations of OneBookShelf's digital marketplaces, while OneBookShelf was renamed to Wolves of Freeport and became a partial owner of Roll20. OneBookShelf itself was formed by the merger of RPGNow and DriveThruRPG in 2006. The company's e-commerce platforms host content from individual sellers, indie creators and major publishing companies such as Chaosium, Fantasy Flight Games, White Wolf, and Wizards of the Coast.

== History ==
=== RPGNow (2001 – 2006) ===
RPGNow was established in 2001 by James Mathe. Academics Sebastian Deterding and José Zagal wrote that "in the beginning, the bestselling products on RPGNow were nearly always d20 products. Mathe made attempts to reach out to established publishers of other types of games, but many were hesitant about selling digital versions, worried that would increase piracy or cannibalize existing print sales. Nevertheless, RPGNow recorded better than 10% growth in every year of its operation".

=== DriveThruRPG (2004 – 2006) ===
DriveThruRPG was established in 2004 by Mike Todd, Chris McDonough and Steve Wieck.

In 2005, DriveThruRPG abandoned selling DRM protected products. The Washington Post reported that "customers hated the hassle of dealing with it, and it didn't offer very good protection against piracy, Wieck said. Now, the site sells unprotected PDFs with a faint 'watermark' with the customer's name on every page. Sales rose 30 percent after the change". Two more DriveThru digital storefronts, DriveThruComics and DriveThruFiction, were also launched in 2005.

In 2007, it was reported that DriveThruRPG did $2 million in business annually.

Wieck said "the business idea of 'first-mover advantage' is more commonly discussed than that of second-mover advantage or being a fast-follower. Despite the many advantages that accrue to first-movers into a new market segment [...], I personally prefer to be a second-mover into many business opportunities. For example, when starting DriveThruRPG, we were a second-mover behind James Mathe, who had already started RPGNow".

=== Merger to become OneBookShelf ===
In 2006, RPGNow and DriveThruRPG merged into a new company called OneBookShelf. Originally, OneBookShelf maintained the separate digital storefronts of RPGNow and DriveThruRPG while merging the digital inventory. James Mathe said "the focus of the merger is providing the best experience for rpg fans. Combined with DriveThruRPG, we will now offer consumers over 9,000 titles from over 500 different publishers. Many of the titles have never been available in print or are no longer available in print".

In 2008, the company took over Mongoose Publishing's Wargaming Online digital store and relaunched it as Wargame Vault.

On April 6, 2009, Wizards of the Coast suspended all sales of its products for the Dungeons & Dragons games in PDF format from places such as OneBookShelf and its subsidiaries RPGNow and DriveThruRPG due to concerns of piracy and copyright infringement. ICv2 reported that OneBookShelf "took a hit to its volume when Wizards of the Coast abruptly halted sales of PDFs of its products" and that although Sean Patrick Fannon, RPG Marketing, Communications, and Publisher Services Manager for OneBookShelf, "acknowledged that the move was a negative for PDF sales, he said that Wizards of the Coast was 'not even close' to half the company's sales".

=== OneBookShelf (2010 – 2022) ===
In 2010, OneBookShelf launched a print on demand program and then in 2012, the company launched a new digital storefront called DriveThruCards for custom card products.

In 2013, OneBookShelf was once again allowed to sell Dungeons & Dragons products through a new partnership with Wizards of the Coast.

OneBookShelf did not originally have an offensive content policy. In 2015, "DriveThruRPG was involved in a controversy due its decision to sell a title called Tournament of Rapists. DriveThruRPG was initially criticized for its slow reaction to complaints about the offensiveness of the product [...], and the product was eventually removed from the store". This led to the creation of an offensive content policy for all of OneBookShelf's platforms. Wieck said:

So, going forward, our offensive content policy is simply going to be this: Offensive Content: We'll know it when we see it. I will be the final arbiter of what OneBookShelf deems offensive. [...] Any title in which racial violence, rape, torture, or a similar subject is treated as a central feature will naturally be subjected to increased scrutiny. [...] We will continue to be reactive, not proactive, on judging new title releases. Historically, 99.99% of publishers' content has been inoffensive. Being able to activate their own titles for sale with our marketplace tools gives publishers additional control over their release marketing timing and generally gets RPG products to market more quickly. [...] Once the reporting feature is live, we will review titles already on the marketplace that are reported by customers. There will be no "grandfathering in" of past content.

Also, in 2015, OnceBookShelf had a credit card breach and hackers "used the OneBookShelf's servers to launch DDOS attack on other sites". ICv2 reported that "one of two load-balanced servers was compromised, the company said, and it had no way of knowing which of the customers that had transactions during that period were processed on which server. [...] It said it had no information to indicate that encrypted credit card numbers of customers that did not make purchases during the period were taken, but could not rule it out".

From February 2016 to March 2016, DriveThruRPG held a bounty program for high quality scans of old hard-to-find Dungeons and Dragons campaigns, modules and boxed sets.

In November 2018, it was announced that in February 2019 the RPGNow digital storefront would be shut down and redirected to the DriveThruRPG digital storefront.

On February 12, 2019, OneBookShelf announced that it would no longer work with Zak Smith "after multiple women publicly accused Smith of abuse. [...] The company went on to say that its own portion of any revenue generated by Smith's existing titles already up for sale on its storefront will be donated to RAINN (Rape, Abuse & Incest National Network), the nation's largest anti-sexual violence organization".

In June 2019, co-founder Mathe passed away. Wieck wrote "well before the iPhone, iPad, or the Kindle, James recognized the opportunity for RPG publishers to reach more fans through digital versions of their titles. By 2004, when I and a few others started DriveThruRPG, we were the Johnny-come-lately to the pioneering work James had already done with RPGNow. Nevertheless, it was through the resulting friendly business rivalry between DriveThruRPG and RPGNow that I got to know and soon came to respect James. [...] James was a very smart entrepreneur in a hobby business full of smart people. He embodied the best of the US Midwestern virtues of work ethic, honesty, and fairness. He's gone too soon".

In June 2020, OneBookShelf came "under scrutiny" after a queer themed adventure by ENNie Award nominated designer Oliver Clegg was removed from the DMsGuild platform for "distinctively sexualized" artwork. "After the adventure was pulled and the DMs Guild released its statement, many DMs Guild creators and D&D fans spoke out about the adventure's removal and a wider discussion of artwork used in Dungeons & Dragons material. Laura Hirsbrunner, another prominent DMs Guild creator, compiled a number of art pieces used in official D&D materials and available for use on the DMs Guild showing women and monsters in sexualized outfits or in various states of nudity". The company responded that "the OneBookShelf team stands by our decision to request adjustments to the art in question in this recent scenario [...]. However, we agree we want to be fair in how such standards are applied, which includes examining any internal biases that might have affected past decisions too. We're still very much in the process of listening, both personally and professionally, so we hope the community will afford us some patience and time in adjusting and improving our own processes and guidelines".

In July 2020, Wizards of the Coast added a sensitivity disclaimer to some of their legacy products for sale on DriveThruRPG and DMsGuild. Many of these products feature cultures inspired by Asia, Mesoamerica and the Middle East.

=== Wolves of Freeport (2022 – present) ===
In June 2022, OneBookShelf announced a new partnership with Roll20 that would allow content creators on DMsGuild to sell modules and add-ons which are directly integrated with Roll20's virtual tabletop system. In July 2022, Roll20 and OneBookShelf announced a merger between the two companies. This merger will combine the content libraries of both companies and make "OneBookShelf's PDF libraries accessible within Roll20". Ankit Lal, CEO of Roll20, will become the new company's CEO and Steve Wieck, CEO of OneBookShelf, will become president of the new company and join Roll20's board of directors. The combined company's name was not initially announced. In 2023, it was revealed that the company's name was simply Roll20, LLC while the OneBookShelf legal entity was now named Wolves of Freeport (named after Wieck's EverQuest guild) which was now a partial owner of Roll20, LLC.

In July 2023, DriveThruRPG updated its marketplace guidelines to restrict the use of generative AI which will go into effect on July 31. Written work "primarily" created by "AI-generated writing will not be allowed" and "standalone artwork products that utilize AI-generated art" will not be allowed. All products that use AI-generated content are now required to report that in the "Creation Method".

== Partnerships ==
=== DNDClassics ===
In 2013, OneBookShelf launched a new digital storefront in partnership with Wizards of the Coast to sell classic Dungeons & Dragons products. This site sold Dungeons & Dragons products from Advanced Dungeons & Dragons through the 4th Edition of the game.

=== Community Card Creator ===
In 2015, OneBookShelf launched a new card creator web application as part of DriveThruCards in partnership with Paizo Publishing for the Pathfinder Adventure Card Game. The "card creator allows fans of PACG to create their own card, which can be purchased and printed for $0.50 each. You can either keep your build private so that it is unique to your deck, or make it publicly available so that other PACG fans can try it out".

=== Dungeon Masters Guild ===
In 2016, OneBookShelf launched a new digital storefront in partnership with Wizards of the Coast called the Dungeon Masters Guild (DMsGuild). The DNDClassics site was replaced by the new DMsGuild storefront. With the 5th Edition Dungeons & Dragons open game license, third party publishers are allowed to print and publish content based on the 5th Edition System Reference Document (SRD). The DMsGuild took that a step further by allowing individuals and third party publishers to create and sell content based on the Forgotten Realms.

The Escapist reported "the Dungeon Masters Guild alone is a big deal since it allows anyone to be paid for Forgotten Realms content - something that once required a specific contract with Wizards of the Coast" and that "options for content range from new monsters, to NPCs, to locations, to entire Forgotten Realms adventures and campaigns. The creator can set any price on their content - or give it away for free - with the only caveat being that Wizards of the Coast and OneBookShelf take a 50% cut of the proceeds".

VentureBeat reported that content on DMsGuild is "available for D&D video game developers to buy. [...] According to D&D spokesperson Greg Tito, Wizards of the Coast would negotiate with the author to license or purchase their creations".

As of 2019, content can now be based on other Wizards of the Coast intellectual property such as Ravenloft, Eberron, and Ravnica.

=== Community Content Programs ===
After the success of the DMsGuild, OneBookShelf continued to partner with other publishers to allow individuals to create and sell content based on intellectual property on the DriveThruRPG website. The number of programs grew rapidly. As of August 2020, there are nearly 30 programs, including ones with well-known publishers like Chaosium, Mongoose Publishing, Pinnacle Entertainment Group and White Wolf.

=== Astral Virtual TableTop ===
In April 2019, it was announced that DriveThruRPG had partnered with Astral Virtual TableTop (Astral) and the virtual tabletop platform received a major update. OneBookShelf said that content "purchased through any DriveThru site, including DriveThruRPG and Dungeon Master's Guild" can be imported and shared in Astral.

In October 2021, Astral's founder Tom Lackemann left the project with OneBookShelf "continuing to oversee and maintain Astral's current services". At the same time, it was announced that Astral would no longer be in active development and its marketplace would shutdown. Following the announced merger between OneBookShelf and Roll20 in July 2022, it was announced that Astral was scheduled to shut down in August 2022.

=== Paizo ===
Paizo, the publishers of the Pathfinder and Starfinder tabletop RPG systems, announced in August 2026 its partnership with DriveThruRPG to sell its catalog of digital books and materials as well as offer physical sales. This came after the bankruptcy of Diamond Comic Distributors, the first distributor of Paizo's physical goods, and while Paizo has their own storefront, the new partnership is aimed to provide wider and more convinent access to their products.

== Reception ==
In 2015, Paste reported that "RPGs can be expensive, so while PDFs can be harder to pass around or to look up rules on, they are a much more financially astute option. DriveThruRPG.com is a great place to find PDFs".

In 2018, Deterding and Zagal wrote that "by its own account, DriveThruRPG, run by OneBookShelf, is currently the largest online marketplace for TRPGs. [...] It allows TRPG publishers to offer their current and historic catalogs as PDFs and print-on-demand books. As online digital and print-on-demand distribution maximizes reach and minimizes up-front investment hurdles and risk, it has contributed to the flourishing of 'long tail,' 'indie' RPGs".

Jason Wilson, for VentureBeat, said that "the DM's Guild is my favorite project from the Dungeons & Dragons team in recent years. [...] The Dungeon Masters Adept program, [...], has resulted in other community writers producing official material on the Guild. We've seen how the Guild just expands on the official books. Now, with Eberron, we're seeing how Wizards can use it to resurrect its past. [...] The DM's Guild gives Wizards a cost-friendly method of opening up the gates to the past. It can conduct some polling on what the community wants on the Guild, when it comes to books for older settings, and then, commission someone to do so".

In 2019, The Verge included DriveThruRPG on a roundup of websites to purchase from that are not Amazon.

In 2020, Polygon reported that "Wizards runs an organized play series known as the D&D Adventurer's League. You can find all of its past 5th edition content online, available for a nominal price. It's among the most polished content on the DMs Guild, with playtesting provided by customers at game stores around the world".
