= Roll20 =

Website for playing tabletop roleplaying games

- Screenshot
- Website type: Online virtual tabletop
- Available in: English^{a}
- Owner: Roll20, LLC
- Creators: Riley Dutton, Nolan T., Richard Zayas
- CEO: Ankit Lal
- Website: www.roll20.net
- Registration: Yes
- Users: 8,000,000+ (as of March 2021)
- Launched: September 17, 2012; 14 years ago
- Written in: HTML5
- ^{a} Supports 18 additional languages through community translations.

Roll20 is a website consisting of a set of tools for playing tabletop role-playing games, also referred to as a virtual tabletop, which can be used as an aid to playing in-person or remotely online. The site was launched in 2012 after a successful Kickstarter campaign. The platform's goal is to provide an authentic tabletop experience that does not try to turn the game into a video game, but instead aids the game master in providing immersive tools online. The blank-slate nature of the platform makes integrating a multitude of tabletop role-playing games possible.

During quarantine as a result of the COVID-19 pandemic, it has allowed a variety of real-life games to transition online, facilitating RPGs in an online space. In July 2022, it was announced that Roll20 would merge with OneBookShelf to become a new company. In June 2024, Roll20 purchased the digital tabletop role-playing toolset company Demiplane.

== History ==
=== 2012 – 2019 ===
Roll20 was originally conceived as a personal project by three college roommates, Riley Dutton, Nolan Jones, and Richard Zayas, to help them continue to play Dungeons & Dragons after graduating and moving to different cities. After realizing that their personal app could help others as well, they started a Kickstarter campaign in the spring of 2012 with an initial goal of $5000; the campaign managed to raise almost $40,000. After a short beta testing period following the end of the Kickstarter campaign, Roll20 was released to the public in September 2012.

Roll20 reported reaching 1 million users in July 2015 and 2 million users in January 2017. Academic Evan Torner, in the book Watch Us Roll: Essays on Actual Play and Performance in Tabletop Role-Playing Games (2021), highlighted the impact of Roll20 on the actual play movement. Torner wrote, "Roll20 allows players to seamlessly control information in a shared 'tabletop' era and broadcast content of interest to both the group itself and the wider audience watching it play. Joined with Twitch and YouTube, it constitutes a powerful tool in the kit of industry up-and-comers" and that the "system would impact the play of millions at mass scale [...]. Roll20 would enable these players to document and broadcast their actual play experiences for others to consume".

In July 2016, Roll20 announced that they had acquired a license from Wizards of the Coast for official Dungeons & Dragons material. Along with the announcement, they released the first official module for Dungeons & Dragons 5th edition, Lost Mine of Phandelver, on the Roll20 Marketplace; which was followed by other releases. In February 2018, Paizo's Pathfinder and Starfinder games became officially supported on the platform.

In September 2018, one of the co-founders of Roll20, Nolan T. Jones, acting as head moderator of the Reddit Roll20 subreddit, banned Reddit user ApostleO; mistaking the account for another previously banned user, whom Nolan believed to be circumventing the prior ban. After a failed attempt to get clarification and correction of the ban, ApostleO deleted his Roll20 account and posted a summary to Reddit of the hostile customer-service. Many users criticized the ban, Jones' response, and the inclusion of Roll20 staff as moderators of the subreddit; leading Roll20 to apologize and turn over moderation of the subreddit to the community.

In February 2019, TechCrunch reported that Roll20's databases had been hacked along with those of 8 other companies, with the information of over 4 million users of the site posted for sale on a dark web marketplace.

=== 2020 – present ===
When the COVID-19 pandemic began to prevent in-person gatherings in 2020, many groups who played in-person role-playing games turned to Roll20 to continue their games virtually. Liz Schuh, head of publishing and licensing for Dungeons & Dragons, stated that "virtual play rose 86%" in 2020 "aided by online platforms such as Roll20 and Fantasy Grounds". Erik Mona, for Paizo, commented that "tools like Roll20 and Discord played a huge role in keeping the Pathfinder and Starfinder communities together. They helped the annual PaizoCon, originally scheduled as an in-person event in Seattle, go fully digital in 2020".

In July 2021, Roll20 increased their subscription costs for the first time with the annual Plus tier increasing from $49.99 to $59.99 and the annual Pro tier increasing from $99.99 to $109.99; the monthly cost of these tiers also increased.

In February 2022, Ankit Lal, a Google veteran, become the company's CEO. Polygon reported that since March 2020 "the company has since tripled in size, growing from just 20 or 25 employees to nearly 60. Lal says that he now has two different groups of employees, one dedicated to users and another to publishers". Dicebreaker reported that per Roll20's PR team "the number of users on Roll20 has doubled in almost two years, going from five million users to more than 10 million". In June 2022, Roll20 announced a new partnership with OneBookShelf that would allow content creators on the Dungeon Masters Guild to sell modules and add-ons which are directly integrated with Roll20's virtual tabletop system.

In July 2022, Roll20 and OneBookShelf announced a merger between the two companies. This merger will combine the content libraries of both companies and make "OneBookShelf's PDF libraries accessible within Roll20". Lal will become the new company's CEO and Steve Wieck, CEO of OneBookShelf, will become president of the new company and join Roll20's board of directors. The combined company retained the name Roll20 with a company legal name of Roll20, LLC.

In June 2024, it was announced that Roll20 had acquired the digital tabletop role-playing toolset company Demiplane. Lal stated: "We want to make it as easy as possible for you to build your first character, to get into your first game, to try out playing TTRPGs. And we think the combination of the Roll20 VTT and the Demiplane character sheet ecosystem is going to do that". Christian Hoffer of ComicBook.com reported that this acquisition "won't have any immediate impact on users of either platform, but Demiplane CEO Peter Romenesko noted that the merged companies will look to close the difference between their two platforms very quickly". J. R. Zambrano, for Bell of Lost Souls, commented that "it seems that an era of consolidation is on the way as players like WotC and Roll20 move to consolidate their powerbases".

== Features ==
Roll20 is a browser-based suite of tools that allows users to create and play tabletop role playing games. It is organized into individual game-sessions, which users can create or join. These game sessions include various features of typical tabletop RPGs, including dynamic character sheets, automated dice rolling, shared maps with basic character and enemy tokens, and triggered sound effects, as well as a character creation tool for certain licensed game systems. The interface also includes integrated text chat, voice chat, and video chat; as well as Google Hangouts integration.

Roll20 also contains a separate marketplace - where art assets and complete game modules are sold - and a reference compendium for several game systems. Compendiums and game modules published through the marketplace are only available to use on the Roll20 platform, while some art assets and art packs can be transferred to other sites or downloaded and used for physical tabletop sessions. In addition to the free content, Roll20 also has extra features available for paying subscriber accounts, including dynamic lighting and fog of war for maps.

Besides the main browser version of Roll20, there are also iPad and Android versions. These mobile versions are more focused on the player experience, containing fewer features than the full browser site. Roll20 is available in English, with moderate support for 17 other languages through community-contributed translations using Crowdin.

Roll20 supports many tabletop systems, including the various editions of Dungeons & Dragons, Pathfinder, Shadowrun, Dungeon World, Gamma World, Traveller, Numenera, 13th Age, and others. For many less known tabletop systems, Roll20 has an open source repository where the community can contribute character sheet templates.

Following the purchase of Demiplane, Roll20 began to support cross-platform access so that content unlocked on one platform would be automatically unlocked on the other platform. As of May 2024, Paizo, Darrington Press, Kobold Press, and Renegade Game Studio have granted permission for cross-platform access to their products.

== Other content ==
=== Roll20CON ===
Roll20 has held an online gaming convention named Roll20CON every year since 2016, consisting of an organized series of online games hosted on Roll20 and streamed on Twitch, along with other events. Roll20 has partnered with charitable organizations to run Roll20CON: The Cybersmile Foundation, an organization providing support for victims of cyberbullying, in 2016; and Take This, an organization focused on mental health in the gaming community, in 2019.

=== Burn Bryte ===
In July 2020, Roll20 released their own science fantasy role-playing game named Burn Bryte, with James Introcaso as lead designer. The game was first announced during Gen Con 2018, and was mentioned to be designed from the bottom up to be played on Roll20's virtual tabletop platform. Starting in August 2018, a playtest was launched for Roll20's Pro-subscribers, which was later expanded to their Plus-subscribers in November of the same year. With the games launch, multiple Actual Play campaigns were started on Twitch.

== Reception ==
Jacob Brogan, in a review of Lost Mine of Phandelver on Roll20 for Slate in 2016, commented that "our experience wasn't always seamless at first" and that "all of this data also taxed my computer's resources, crashing my browser outright on at least one occasion. [...] In time, I overcame most of those hurdles, however, partly because Lost Mines has been so well implemented here. [...] Though working through it still requires care and preparation—much as its predigital version would—there's more than enough in the virtual package to while away hours with your fellow gamers, however far away they may be. More than any other virtual gaming system I've played with, Roll20's Lost Mines captured what it's like to delve into dungeons".

Ryan Hiller, for GeekDad in 2017, stated that "Roll20 is an industry leading web and tablet based virtual-tabletop application" and that "Roll20 is one of my must have digital tools for roleplaying". Hiller highlighted the fog-of-war and dynamic lighting features – "in a virtual game, each player would see only what they could see from where their specific character is standing and with the light they have available. This adds a whole new depth to the game as some players see encounters from entirely different perspectives, and areas of shadow become evident for use in concealment. Suddenly the rogue becomes much more interesting".

Tyler Wilde, for PC Gamer in 2017, compared using Roll20 and Tabletop Simulator to play Dungeons & Dragons. He wrote that Roll20 "is the cheaper, more practical solution for remote D&D: a clean mapping interface, easy access to official reference material, built-in video chat, and quick dice rolls. More serious players will probably prefer it". Leif Johnson, in a 2020 update on virtual tabletops for PC Gamer, wrote that Roll20 "allows a dizzying range of customization for maps, tokens, and more. Its menus are a bit drab, but they're intuitive almost to the point of genius, and the package is especially celebrated for its fantastic line-of-sight dynamic lighting system". However, the platform has some drawbacks such as "it's browser-based, which means your gameplay's subject to the vagaries of the server. It may cost nothing up front, but the free version restricts you to 100 MB for uploadable assets; to get 1GB, you'll need to fork over $4.99 a month or $49 per year. You also can't use the dynamic lighting functions unless you pay the sub, although you'll still have a fog of war option if you choose not to pay. But these are hardly deal killers. If you're relatively new to D&D and want a friendly place to hop in, Roll20's probably the best place to do it outside of a dining room table with friends".

Ari Szporn, for CBR in 2020, highlighted that Roll20 "provides integrated audio and video chat functions in an attempt to provide as comprehensive an experience as possible" and that the marketplace has third-party content creators who "can upload their own tokens, map tiles, pre-written adventures and more for members to purchase. Roll20 also has a 'Looking For Group' service to help players and DMs find new people to play with". Szporn also commented on Roll20's subscription service and stated that the free tier is "the best option for new players but is not recommended for DMs due to its limited access to Roll20's more advanced features". Luc Tran, in a separate review of various virtual tabletops for CBR, wrote that Roll20 has "a straightforward design tool for maps, dungeons and towns, as well as the ability to create and name multiple simple commands for actions like dice rolling [...]. While Roll20 is great, the fact that it is not licensed by Wizards of the Coast means it lacks a lot of official D&D material. Unless players choose to purchase specific game compendiums, D&D-specific characters, races, monsters and items will either have to be recreated in Roll20 or you'll have to find suitable replacements".

Academics Daniel Lawson and Justin Wigard, in the book Roleplaying Games in the Digital Age: Essays on Transmedia Storytelling, Tabletop RPGs and Fandom (2021), examined Roll20 as a digital space and the potential barriers to entry in play, such as the digital divide and various disabilities. They reviewed the levels of subscription and wrote that "Roll20 indelibly connects functionality to money. Thus, higher levels of subscription offer increased modes of accessibility in terms of available functionality within Roll20. In brief, money purchases remediative features—and thus rhetorical agency— in these game spaces. [...] Roll20 provides easy-to-use tools for integrating external assets, but incentivizes purchases assets which dramatically reduce accessibility barriers through ease of access".

=== Awards ===
Roll20 was named the Gold Winner in the "Best Software" category of the ENnie Awards in 2013, 2014, 2015, and 2016.

== See also ==
- D&D Beyond
- Fantasy Grounds
- Foundry VTT
