= Character sheet =

Record of a player character in a role-playing game

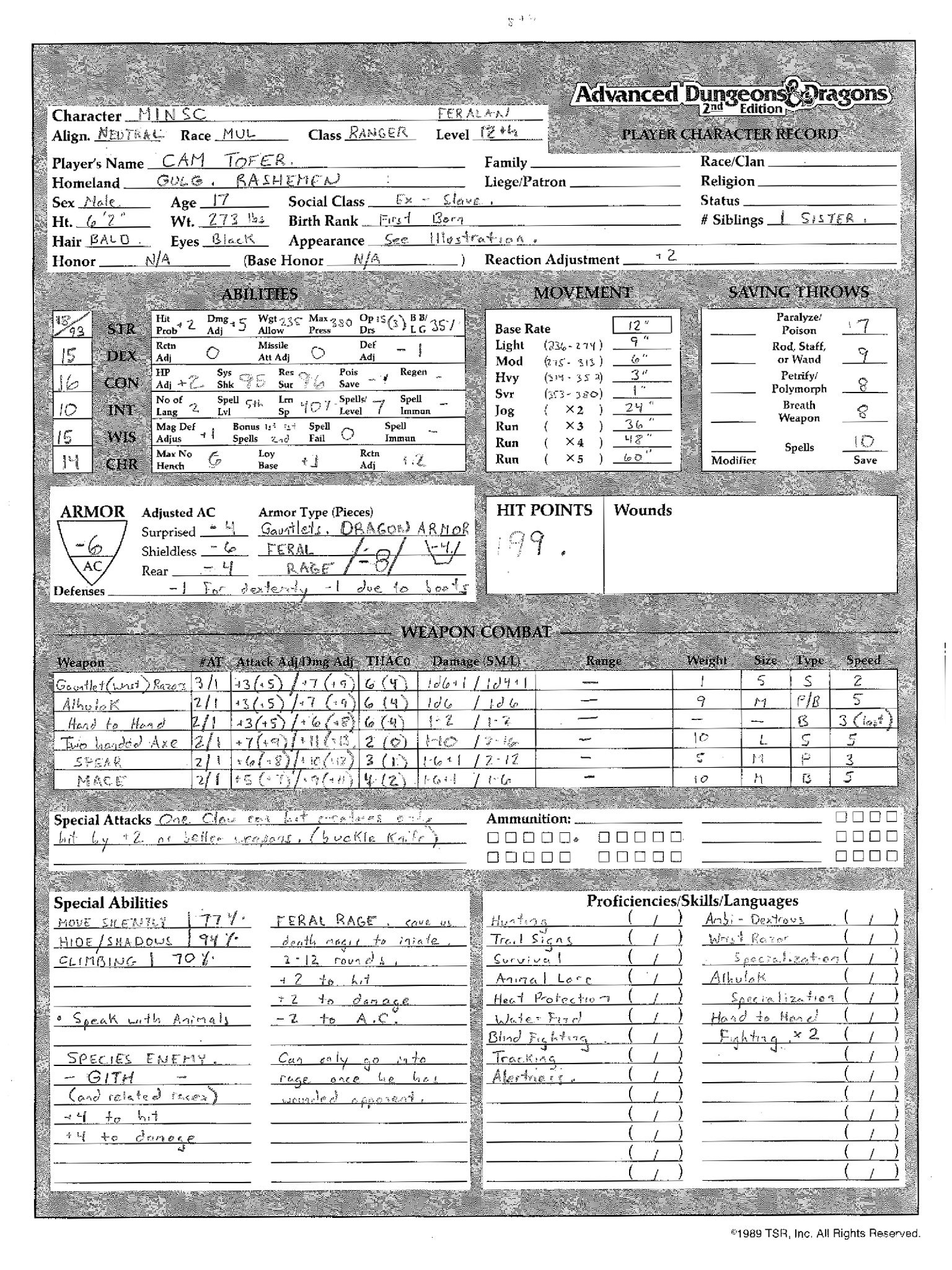
A character sheet from Advanced Dungeons & Dragons

A character sheet is a record of a player character in a role-playing game, including whatever details, notes, game statistics, and background information a player would need during a play session. Character sheets can be found in use in both traditional and live-action role-playing games. Almost all role-playing games make use of character sheets in some fashion; even "rules-light" systems and freeform role-playing games record character details in some manner.

The role-playing video game equivalent is known as a status screen. Some non-role-playing games, such as some board games and party games, also use records that could be compared to character sheets.

== History ==
The first role-playing game published, Dungeons & Dragons (1974), did not include a character sheet. The first one ever published was in the Haven Herald fanzine of Stephen Tihor published on May 3, 1975. One month after, another character sheet was released in the APA magazine Alarums and Excursions.

Since then, most tabletop role-playing games use a character sheet for information about the player characters. Most of them fit onto one page, but some games like Castle Falkenstein or Sailor Moon RPG use a full booklet. Other games such as Ars Magica (covenant sheet) or Warhammer Fantasy Roleplay III (party sheet) and Reign use a sheet for a group of player characters.

== Overview ==
What is considered relevant can vary by game and personal preference—one player may consider his character's eye color or personal background relevant while another might not, but both may be required by the game rules to note down on their sheet if their character suffers an injury.

The layout of a character sheet, when creating a sheet or choosing which one to use, is important. First, the sheet must allow the player to record what the system finds relevant to their character. Second, it must allow the player to easily find and read off information at a glance when they need it. In addition, if the character sheet is more than one page long, careful consideration must be given to put the most often used data areas at the front page. In all cases, care must be given to ensuring that the layout is generally well organized, grouping similar areas together logically while being easily readable and not overcrowded.

=== Contents of a Character Sheet ===
A character sheet is likely to include stable attributes, such as the character's name and physical characteristics. It may also include values that change often such as experience, abilities, health/vitality (e.g. hit points) and an inventory of items possessed. It is common for a character sheet to essentially be a record of a character's history as changes are made and important things noted. It is referenced during gameplay. Despite the name, a single character "sheet" may actually be two or more pages in length.

The content and design of such a sheet varies greatly among games, and is a reflection of what the system considers important. For instance, Dungeons & Dragons, being a high fantasy dungeon crawler, requires a description of a character (same as every game), combat capabilities, and magic abilities if applicable. As such, the character sheet focuses on the character and the basic combat abilities, with an optional secondary page on magic. Another example is how in comparison, Call of Cthulhu has a larger section on skills and what is possible, without the unspoken abilities of a Dungeons and Dragons character.

Going to extremes, character sheets can even hold nothing on the characters being played. An example of that is Alice is Missing, where the character sheet is a record of what has happened to the character in the game at that point, and not on the abilities of each character.

A player may have an additional character sheet if he also controls a second character, a cohort or a hireling, but this is less common. The dungeon master, who runs the game, may optionally keep proper character sheets for non-player characters (NPCs) if he wishes to keep full information on the character. Some rulebooks offer special “NPC sheets” for this purpose that are considerably smaller than the usual (main) character sheets.

== Formats ==
=== Paper ===
Character sheets for a game are usually found within the game's main rulebook, and permission is almost always given for players to photocopy this sheet. Some publishers sell preprinted sheets separately. Many offer PDF files with character sheets for the players to print out themselves. These sheets are generally forms split into sections that hold the information related to play the game.

It is not uncommon for players to create custom character sheets, to their own design, rather than use the publisher's “official” offerings. Some design their own sheets or record their character information on an empty sheet of paper, although inexperienced players are recommended to use formatted sheets to avoid leaving out important information.

=== Electronic ===
With the advent of personal computing, players began designing character sheets with computers. The earliest computer-generated character sheets were designed in a word processing program, so that players could fill in their information and have a typewritten sheet to use. Next, players began to experiment with spreadsheet solutions, so that some of the calculations required were automated. Some important advantages of spreadsheet character sheets are ease of access, automatic calculations, complex formulas can be more easily coded and they remove reliance on pen and paper. Wizards of the Coast included a character generator CD with their Player's Handbook, 3rd Edition, and offered the Character Builder for download to D&D Insider subscribers, alongside a Monster Builder as part of Dungeons and Dragons Adventure Tools.

=== Dynamic ===
A Dynamic Character Sheet is an electronic sheet that is used in conjunction with a computer/mobile device during gaming sessions. Such a character sheet is used not only to track the character, but to also add/apply effects to the character on the fly. For example, if the character receives the effects of a spell which increases its strength score, then a dynamic character sheet will be able to automatically update all the effects of a higher strength character. Another example is if a character activates one of his abilities, the dynamic character sheet will be able to apply the effects of that ability in real time. Furthermore, such character sheets enable the player to track the duration of the applied effect, thus turning off effects that have expired.
