= Cthulhu Mythos anthology =

Short story collections set in the milieu created by H. P. Lovecraft

A Cthulhu Mythos anthology is a type of short story collection that contains stories written in, or related to, the Cthulhu Mythos genre of horror fiction launched by H. P. Lovecraft. Such anthologies have helped to define and popularize the genre.

== Tales of the Cthulhu Mythos ==
Tales of the Cthulhu Mythos
- First edition
- Author: H. P. Lovecraft and others
- Cover artist: Lee Brown Coye
- Language: English
- Genre: Fantasy, Horror
- Publisher: Arkham House
- Publication date: 1969
- Publication place: United States
- Media type: Print (hardback)
- Pages: vii, 407

Tales of the Cthulhu Mythos, edited by writer August Derleth and published by Arkham House in 1969, is considered the first Cthulhu Mythos anthology. It contained two stories by Lovecraft, a number of reprints of pieces written by members of Lovecraft's circle of correspondents, and several new tales written for the collection by a new generation of Cthulhu Mythos writers. It was published in an edition of 4,024 copies.

Derleth prefaced the collection with "The Cthulhu Mythos", an outline of his (sometimes controversial) views on the development and content of the Mythos. In this introduction, Derleth prematurely declared the genre to be dead--"for certainly the Mythos as an inspiration for new fiction is hardly likely to afford readers with enough that is new and sufficiently different in execution to create a continuing and growing demand".

Lin Carter later wrote that Tales of the Cthulhu Mythos "marked the beginning of a new era in the history of the Mythos for many reasons, and one of the most important was that it introduced a number of new writers in the Mythos."

=== Contents ===
The contents of the original 1969 edition are:

- "The Cthulhu Mythos" by August Derleth
- "The Call of Cthulhu" by H. P. Lovecraft
- "The Return of the Sorcerer" by Clark Ashton Smith
- "Ubbo-Sathla" by Clark Ashton Smith
- "The Black Stone" by Robert E. Howard
- "The Hounds of Tindalos" by Frank Belknap Long
- "The Space-Eaters" by Frank Belknap Long
- "The Dweller in Darkness" by August Derleth
- "Beyond the Threshold" by August Derleth
- "The Shambler from the Stars" by Robert Bloch
- "The Haunter of the Dark" by H. P. Lovecraft
- "The Shadow from the Steeple" by Robert Bloch
- "Notebook Found in a Deserted House" by Robert Bloch
- "The Salem Horror" by Henry Kuttner
- "The Haunter of the Graveyard" by J. Vernon Shea*
- "Cold Print" by J. Ramsey Campbell*
- "The Sister City" by Brian Lumley*
- "Cement Surroundings" by Brian Lumley*
- "The Deep Ones" by James Wade*
- "The Return of the Lloigor" by Colin Wilson*

*First appeared in this collection

=== Reprints ===
- New York: Ballantine, 1971 (two volumes).
- London: Grafton, 1988.
- Sauk City, WI: Arkham House, November 1990 (variant contents). This later revised edition, edited and introduced by Jim Turner, drops the stories by Shea and Wade and the two by Lumley and adds the following seven tales:
  - "The Terror from the Depths" by Fritz Leiber
  - "Rising with Surtsey" by Brian Lumley
  - "My Boat" by Joanna Russ
  - "Sticks" by Karl Edward Wagner
  - "The Freshman" by Philip José Farmer
  - "Jerusalem's Lot" by Stephen King
  - "Discovery of the Ghooric Zone" by Richard A. Lupoff

For the full details of the 1990 revised edition, see Tales of the Cthulhu Mythos: Golden Anniversary Anthology below.

== The Spawn of Cthulhu ==
The Spawn of Cthulhu
- First edition (1971)
- Editor: Lin Carter
- Author: H. P. Lovecraft and others
- Cover artist: Gervasio Gallardo
- Language: English
- Genre: Fantasy, Horror
- Publisher: Ballantine Books
- Publication place: United States
- Media type: Print (paperback)
- ISBN: 0-345-02394-3

The Spawn of Cthulhu is an anthology of fantasy short stories, edited by Lin Carter. It was first published in paperback by Ballantine Books in October 1971 as the 36th volume of its Ballantine Adult Fantasy series. It was the fifth such anthology assembled by Carter for the series.

The book collects 12 fantasy tales and poems by various authors that either influenced or were influenced by the Cthulhu Mythos stories of H. P. Lovecraft, including one story by H. P. Lovecraft himself, with an overall introduction and notes by Carter.

=== Contents ===
The contents are:

- "Introduction: About The Spawn of Cthulhu and H. P. Lovecraft" (Lin Carter)
- "The Whisperer in Darkness" (H. P. Lovecraft)
- "An Inhabitant of Carcosa" (Ambrose Bierce)
- "The Yellow Sign" (from The King in Yellow) (Robert W. Chambers)
- "Cordelia's Song from The King in Yellow" (Vincent Starrett)
- "The Return of Hastur" (August Derleth)
- "Litany to Hastur" (from Dreams from R'lyeh) (Lin Carter)
- "The Children of the Night" (Robert E. Howard)
- "K'n-yan" (Walter C. DeBill Jr.)
- "The Tale of Satampra Zeiros" (Clark Ashton Smith)
- "The Hounds of Tindalos" (Frank Belknap Long)
- "The Curse of Yig" (Zealia Brown Reed Bishop)
- "The Mine on Yuggoth" (Ramsey Campbell)

== The Disciples of Cthulhu ==
The Disciples of Cthulhu
- Editor: Edward P. Berglund
- Cover artist: Karel Thole
- Language: English
- Genre: Fantasy, Horror
- Publisher: DAW Books
- Publication date: 1976
- Publication place: United States
- Media type: Print (paperback)
- Pages: 288

The Disciples of Cthulhu was edited by Edward P. Berglund and published by DAW Books in 1976. Berglund later described it as "the first professional, all-original, Cthulhu Mythos anthology".

Perhaps responding to the introduction to Derleth's collection, Berglund wrote in his preface: "Whether or not there is a market for the Cthulhu Mythos stories, established and amateur writers will continue to write them for their own and their friends' amusement and enjoyment. It is inevitable that one or more readers of this volume will be influenced into trying his hand at writing within the Cthulhu Mythos genre."

=== Contents ===
The contents are:

- "Editor's Foreword" by Edward P. Berglund
- "Introduction" by Robert Bloch
- "The Fairground Horror" by Brian Lumley
- "The Silence of Erika Zann" by James Wade
- "All-Eye" by Bob Van Laerhoven
- "The Tugging" by Ramsey Campbell
- "Where Yidhra Walks" by Walter C. DeBill Jr.
- "The Feaster from Afar" by Joseph Payne Brennan
- "Zoth-Ommog" by Lin Carter
- "Darkness, My Name Is" by Eddy C. Bertin
- "The Terror from the Depths" by Fritz Leiber

When the collection was reprinted by Chaosium in 1996, the Carter and Brennan stories were replaced by "Dope War of the Black Tong", a new Robert M. Price pastiche of Carter and Robert E. Howard, and "Glimpses" by A. A. Attanasio, which was supposed to be published in the original Disciples but ended up in the Arkham House anthology Nameless Places instead.

== New Tales of the Cthulhu Mythos ==
New Tales of the Cthulhu Mythos
- Editor: Ramsey Campbell
- Cover artist: Jason Van Hollander
- Language: English
- Genre: Fantasy, horror
- Publisher: Arkham House
- Publication date: 1980
- Publication place: United States
- Media type: Print (hardback)
- Pages: xi, 257
- ISBN: 0-87054-085-8

New Tales of the Cthulhu Mythos was edited by Ramsey Campbell and published by Arkham House in 1980 in an edition of 3,647 copies. In his introduction, Campbell noted that "[i]n recent years the Mythos at times has seemed in danger of becoming conventionalized," despite the fact that "Lovecraft's intention and achievement was precisely to avoid the predictability and resultant lack of terror which beset the conventional macabre fiction of his day." Therefore, Campbell wrote, "in this anthology I have tended to favor less familiar treatments or uses of the Mythos.... They contain few erudite occultists, decaying towns, or stylistic pastiches.... Indeed, one of our tales hints at the ultimate event of the Mythos without ever referring to the traditional names."

One story in the book is an expansion, by Martin S. Warnes, of Lovecraft's fragment "The Book".

=== Contents ===
The contents are:

- "Introduction"
- "Crouch End" by Stephen King
- "The Star Pools" by A. A. Attanasio
- "The Second Wish" by Brian Lumley
- "Dark Awakening" by Frank Belknap Long
- "Shaft Number 247" by Basil Copper
- "Black Man with a Horn" by T. E. D. Klein
- "The Black Tome of Alsophocus" by H. P. Lovecraft & Martin S. Warnes
- "Than Curse the Darkness" by David Drake
- "The Faces at Pine Dunes" by Ramsey Campbell
- "Notes on Contributors"

== Tales of the Cthulhu Mythos: Golden Anniversary Anthology ==
Tales of the Cthulhu Mythos
- Author: H. P. Lovecraft and others
- Illustrator: Jeffrey K. Potter
- Cover artist: Jeffrey K. Potter
- Language: English
- Genre: Fantasy, Horror
- Publisher: Arkham House
- Publication date: November 1990
- Publication place: United States
- Media type: Print (hardback)
- Pages: xiv, 529
- ISBN: 0-87054-159-5

Arkham House released a revised edition of Tales of the Cthulhu Mythos in November 1990, edited by Jim Turner with a substantially different selection of stories, reflecting the editor's disdain for "Mythos pastiches in which eccentric New England recluses utter the right incantations in the wrong books and are promptly eaten by a giant frog named Cthulhu." It was released in an edition of 7,015 copies.

Turner eliminates some authors from the earlier edition (totalling four stories, those by Wade, Shea and two by Lumley) --while still suggesting that "a few of the earliest pieces in this volume...now seem like pop-cultural kitsch." The added seven stories, he writes, are from "the relative handful of successful works that have been influenced by the Cthulhu Mythos...exemplifying the darkly enduring power of H. P. Lovecraft over a disparate group of writers who have made their own inimitable contributions to the Mythos."

=== Contents ===
The contents of the 1990 revised edition are:

- "Iä! Iä! Cthulhu Fhtagn!", by Jim Turner
- "The Call of Cthulhu" by H. P. Lovecraft
- "The Return of the Sorcerer" by Clark Ashton Smith
- "Ubbo-Sathla" by Clark Ashton Smith
- "The Black Stone" by Robert E. Howard
- "The Hounds of Tindalos" by Frank Belknap Long
- "The Space-Eaters" by Frank Belknap Long
- "The Dweller in Darkness" by August Derleth
- "Beyond the Threshold" by August Derleth
- "The Shambler from the Stars" by Robert Bloch
- "The Haunter of the Dark" by H. P. Lovecraft
- "The Shadow from the Steeple" by Robert Bloch
- "Notebook Found in a Deserted House" by Robert Bloch
- "The Salem Horror" by Henry Kuttner
- "The Terror from the Depths" by Fritz Leiber
- "Rising with Surtsey" by Brian Lumley
- "Cold Print" by Ramsey Campbell
- "The Return of the Lloigor" by Colin Wilson
- "My Boat" by Joanna Russ
- "Sticks" by Karl Edward Wagner
- "The Freshman" by Philip José Farmer
- "Jerusalem's Lot" by Stephen King
- "Discovery of the Ghooric Zone" by Richard A. Lupoff

=== Reprints ===
==== Arkham House ====
- second printing, 2000 (no print numbers given).

==== Others ====
- New York: Ballantine/Del Rey, 1998.

== Tales of the Lovecraft Mythos ==
Tales of the Lovecraft Mythos
- Editor: Robert M. Price
- Cover artist: Gahan Wilson
- Language: English
- Genre: Fantasy, Horror short stories
- Publisher: Fedogan & Bremer
- Publication date: 1992
- Publication place: United States
- Media type: Print (hardback)
- Pages: 327 pp
- ISBN: 1-878252-02-X

Tales of the Lovecraft Mythos was edited by Robert M. Price and published by Fedogan & Bremer in 1992. In an introduction, Price provides a "sketch of the Lovecraft Mythos and its evolution into the Cthulhu Mythos"—raising a defense of August Derleth's interpretation of the Mythos along the way. Price writes that his intent in making selections was to assemble "an alternate version" of Derleth's Tales of the Cthulhu Mythos, though limited in scope to the writers of the pulp era. He included several pieces long out of print or reprinted only in obscure fanzines, and tried to focus on "stories in which certain important Mythos names or items are either first mentioned or most fully explained by the author who created them".

=== Contents ===
The contents are:

- "Preface", by Robert Bloch
- "Introduction", by Robert M. Price
- "The Thing on the Roof" by Robert E. Howard
- "The Fire of Asshurbanipal" by Robert E. Howard
- "The Seven Geases" by Clark Ashton Smith
- "Fane of the Black Pharaoh" by Robert Bloch
- "The Invaders" by Henry Kuttner
- "Bells of Horror" by Henry Kuttner
- "The Thing That Walked on the Wind" by August Derleth
- "Ithaqua" by August Derleth
- "The Lair of the Star-Spawn" by August Derleth & Mark Shorer
- "The Lord of Illusion" by E. Hoffmann Price (Price's original draft of the collaboration with HP Lovecraft, "Through the Gates of the Silver Key")
- "The Warder of Knowledge" by Richard F. Searight
- "The Scourge of B'Moth" by Bertram Russell
- "The House of the Worm" by Mearle Prout
- "Spawn of the Green Abyss" by C. Hall Thompson
- "The Guardian of the Book" by Henry Hasse
- "The Abyss" by Robert A. W. Lowndes
- "Music of the Stars" by Duane W. Rimel
- "The Aquarium" by Carl Jacobi
- "The Horror Out of Lovecraft" by Donald A. Wolheim
- "To Arkham and the Stars" by Fritz Leiber

== Cthulhu's Heirs ==
Cthulhu's Heirs
- Editor: Thomas M. K. Stratman
- Language: English
- Genre: Fantasy, Horror
- Publisher: Chaosium
- Publication date: 1994
- Publication place: United States
- Media type: Print (paperback)
- ISBN: 1-56882-013-5

Cthulhu's Heirs was edited by Thomas M. K. Stratman and published by Chaosium in 1994. With the exception of contributions by Ramsey Campbell and Hugh B. Cave, the stories included are original to the collection. Stratman describes the tales as "more than 20 writers' visions into the landscape of Lovecraft Country."

=== Contents ===
The contents are:

- "Watch the Whiskers Sprout" by D. F. Lewis
- "The Death Watch" by Hugh B. Cave
- "The Return of the White Ship: The Quest for Cathuria" by Arthur William and Lloyd Breach
- "Kadath/The Vision and the Journey" by T. Winter-Damon
- "The Franklyn Paragraphs" by Ramsey Campbell
- "Behold, I Stand at the Door and Knock" by Robert M. Price
- "1968 RPI" by Joe Murphy
- "Those of the Air" by Darrell Schweitzer and Jason van Hollander
- "Mr. Skin" by Victor Milán
- "Just Say No" by Gregory Nicoll
- "The Scourge" by Charles M. Saplak
- "Pickman's Legacy" by Gordon Linzner
- "Of Dark Things & Midnight Places" by David Niall Wilson
- "The Likeness" by Dan Perez
- "An Early Frost" by Scott David Aniolowski
- "Scene: A Room" by Craig Anthony
- "The Seven Cities of Gold" by Crispin Burnham
- "Shadows of Her Dreams" by Cary G. Osborne
- "The Herald" by Daniel M. Burrello
- "Typo" by Michael D. Winkle
- "Star Bright, Star Byte" by Marella Sands

Cthulhu's Heirs won the Origins Award for Best Game-Related Fiction of 1994.

== The Starry Wisdom ==
The Starry Wisdom: A Tribute to H. P. Lovecraft
- Editor: D. M. Mitchell
- Language: English
- Genre: Fantasy, Horror
- Publisher: Creation Books
- Publication date: 1994
- Publication place: United Kingdom
- Media type: Print (paperback)
- Pages: 191
- ISBN: 1-871592-32-1

The Starry Wisdom: A Tribute to H. P. Lovecraft was edited by D. M. Mitchell and published by Creation Books in 1994. Declaring that "Lovecraft has suffered much at the hands of unmindful critics and even more from uninspired and talentless imitators," Mitchell declares that the collection's goal is "to dig deeper, to bypass the superficial and access the subterranean channels of archetype and inspiration with which Lovecraft was connected.... [Lovecraft] crafted morbid and disturbing allegories of social and biological upheaval--cryptically prophetic and spiritually exploratory--this latent content of his work now needs excavating."

Some of the stories in the collection — such as those by Burroughs and Ballard — were not inspired by Lovecraft, but were seen by Mitchell as sharing his "visions of cosmic alienation". In those stories that make direct references to the Cthulhu Mythos, they are "used only in passing--in the same informal way in which Lovecraft himself intended."

=== Contents ===
The contents are:

- "Lovecraft in Heaven" by Grant Morrison
- "Third Eye Butterfly" by James Havoc and Mike Philbin
- "A Thousand Young" by Robert M. Price
- "The Night Sea-Maid Went Down" by Brian Lumley
- "From this Swamp" by Henry Wessels
- "Prisoner of the Coral Deep" by J. G. Ballard
- "Black Static" by David Conway
- "Red Mass" by Dan Kellett
- "Wind Die. You Die. We Die" by William S. Burroughs
- "The Call of Cthulhu" by John Coulthart & H. P. Lovecraft
- "Potential" by Ramsey Campbell
- "Walpurgisnachtmusik" by Simon Whitechapel
- "Meltdown" by D. F. Lewis
- "Beyond Reflection" by John Beal
- "This Exquisite Corpse" by C. G. Brandrick & D. M. Mitchell
- "Extracted from the Mouth of the Consumer, Rotting Pig" by Michael Gira
- "Hypothetical Materfamilias" by Adele O. Gladwell
- "The Sound of a Door Opening" by Don Webb
- "The Courtyard" by Alan Moore
- "The Dreamers in Darkness" by Peter Smith
- "Pills for Miss Betsy" by Rick Grimes
- "23 Nails" by Stephen Sennitt
- "Ward 23" by D. M. Mitchell

== Cthulhu 2000 ==
Cthulhu 2000: A Lovecraftian Anthology was edited by Jim Turner and published by Arkham House in 1995 in an edition of 4,927 copies. As in his earlier collection, Turner criticizes the "latter-day Mythos pastiche" as simply "a banal modern horror story, preceded by the inevitable Necronomicon epigraph and indiscriminately interspersed with sesquipedalian deities, ichor-oozing tentacles, sundry eldritch abominations, and then the whole sorry mess rounded off with a cachinnating chorus of "Iä! Iä!"-chanting frogs." He declares that "the works collected in the present volume are not great Lovecraft stories; they rather are great stories in some way inspired by Lovecraft."

== The New Lovecraft Circle ==
The New Lovecraft Circle
- Editor: Robert M. Price
- Cover artist: Gahan Wilson
- Language: English
- Genre: Fantasy, Horror
- Publisher: Fedogan & Bremer
- Publication date: 1996
- Publication place: United States
- Media type: Print (hardback)
- Pages: 371
- ISBN: 1-878252-16-X

The New Lovecraft Circle was edited by Robert M. Price and published by Fedogan & Bremer in 1996 in an edition of 2,000 copies. Presenting the book as a sequel to Tales of the Lovecraft Mythos, which focused on the circle of writers around Lovecraft that were collected in the first half of Derleth's Tales of the Cthulhu Mythos, Price declares that "the present collection means to ape the second half, to commemorate that dawn of a new era of Mythos fiction." He describes the contents as "little known and seldom seen stories by most of the seven members of the New Lovecraft Circle numbered by Lin Carter and by other, more recent adepts as well, for the tradition grows. The cult will not be stamped out."

=== Contents ===
The contents are:

- "Preface", by Ramsey Campbell
- "Introduction", by Robert M. Price
- "The Plain of Sound" by Ramsey Campbell
- "The Stone on the Island" by Ramsey Campbell
- "The Statement of One John Gibson" by Brian Lumley
- "Demoniacal" by David Sutton
- "The Kiss of Bugg-Shash" by Brian Lumley
- "The Slitherer from the Slime" by H. P. Lowcraft
- "The Doom of Yakthoob" by Lin Carter
- "The Fishers from Outside" by Lin Carter
- "The Keeper of the Flame" by Gary Myers
- "Dead Giveaway" by J. Vernon Shea
- "Those Who Wait" by James Wade
- "The Keeper of Dark Point" by John Glasby
- "The Black Mirror" by John Glasby
- "I've Come to Talk with You Again" by Karl Edward Wagner
- "The Howler in the Dark" by Richard L. Tierney
- "The Horror on the Beach" by Alan Dean Foster
- "The Whisperers" by Richard Lupoff
- "Lights! Camera! Shub-Niggurath!" by Richard Lupoff
- "Saucers from Yaddith" by Robert M. Price
- "Vastarien" by Thomas Ligotti
- "The Madness out of Space" by Peter H. Cannon
- "Aliah Warden" by Roger Johnson
- "The Last Supper" by Donald R. Burleson
- "The Church at Garlock's Bend" by David Kaufman
- "The Spheres Beyond Sound (Threnody)" by Stephen Mark Rainey

== Song of Cthulhu ==
Song of Cthulhu
- Editor: Stephen Mark Rainey
- Language: English
- Genre: Fantasy, Horror
- Publisher: Chaosium
- Publication date: July 2001
- Publication place: United States
- Media type: Print (paperback)
- Pages: 200
- ISBN: 978-1-56882-117-7

Song of Cthulhu was published by Chaosium in July 2001, edited by Stephen Mark Rainey. This themed anthology featured stories about using music to interact with the various entities from H. P. Lovecraft's Cthulhu Mythos, as typified in Lovecraft's story, "The Music of Erich Zann", which is included in the anthology. Cover art by Harry Fassl.

=== Contents ===
The contents are:

- "The Music of Erich Zann" by H. P. Lovecraft
- "The Dark Beauty of Unheard Horrors" by Thomas Ligotti
- "In the Rue d'Auseil" by Fred Chappell
- "The Plain of Sound" by Ramsey Campbell
- "The Last Show at Verdi's Supper Club" by Stephen Mark Rainey
- "Water Music for the Tillers of Soil" by Tom Piccirilli
- "Shallow Fathoms" by M. Christian
- "How Nyarlathotep Rocked Our World" by Gregory Nicoll
- "Listen" by James Robert Smith
- "Mud" by Brian McNaughton
- "Paedomorphosis" by Caitlin R. Kiernan
- "Intruders" by Hugh B. Cave
- "Chant" by Robert Weinberg
- "Ghoul's Tale" by Robert M. Price
- "The Next Big Thing" by Rob Suggs
- "The Flautists" by Edward P. Berglund
- "Fall From Grace" by D. F. Lewis
- "Drums" by William R. Trotter
- "The Enchanting of Lila Woods" by E. A. Lustig
- "Yog-Sothoth, Superstar" by Thomas F. Monteleone

== The Children of Cthulhu ==
The Children of Cthulhu
- Editor: John Pelan and Benjamin Adams
- Language: English
- Genre: Fantasy, horror
- Publisher: Ballantine Books
- Publication date: 2002
- Publication place: United States
- Media type: Print (paperback)
- ISBN: 0-345-44926-6

The Children of Cthulhu, published by Ballantine Books in 2002, was edited by John Pelan and Benjamin Adams. In the introduction, the editors wrote:

For this collection, we asked authors to break past the '[if it ain't broke,] don't fix it' mentality and bring Lovecraft's original concepts kicking and screaming into the twenty-first century.... The stories in this collection range from the historical to the futuristic. What they share is each writer's reaction to the vision of H. P. Lovecraft and an affinity for his core concepts.:

All the stories are original to the volume with the exception of Poppy Z. Brite's "Are You Loathsome Tonight?", which originally appeared in her 1998 collection of the same name.

=== Contents ===
The contents are:

- "Details" by China Miéville
- "Visitation" by James Robert Smith
- "The Invisible Empire" by James Van Pelt
- "A Victorian Pot Dresser" by L. H. Maynard & M. P. N. Sims
- "The Cabin in the Woods" by Richard Laymon
- "The Stuff of the Stars, Leaking" by Tim Lebbon
- "Sour Places" by Mark Chadbourn
- "Meet Me on the Other Side" by Yvonne Navarro
- "That's the Story of My Life" by John Pelan & Benjamin Adams
- "Long Meg and Her Daughters" by Paul Finch
- "A Fatal Exception Has Occurred At..." by Alan Dean Foster
- "Dark of the Moon" by James S. Dorr
- "Red Clay" by J. Michael Reaves
- "Principles and Parameters" by Meredith L. Patterson
- "Are You Loathsome Tonight?" by Poppy Z. Brite
- "The Serenade of Starlight" by W. H. Pugmire, Esq.
- "Outside" by Steve Rasnic Tem
- "Nor the Demons Down Under the Sea" by Caitlín R. Kiernan
- "The Spectacle of a Man" by Weston Ochse
- "The Firebrand Symphony" by Brian Hodge
- "Teeth" by Matt Cardin

== Cthulhu Unbound ==
Cthulhu Unbound
- Editors: John Sunseri and Thom Brannan
- Cover artist: Cyril Van Der Haegen
- Language: English
- Genre: Fantasy, horror
- Publisher: Permuted Press
- Publication date: 2009
- Publication place: United States
- Media type: Print (paperback)
- ISBN: 978-1-934861-13-4
- Followed by: Cthulhu Unbound 2

Cthulhu Unbound was published by Permuted Press on March 30, 2009. It was edited by John Sunseri and Thom Brannan. The volume is a "cross-genre" anthology, telling Lovecraft-inspired comedies, space opera, hardboiled noir, etc.

=== Contents ===
- "Noir-lathotep" by Linda Donahue
- "The Invasion Out of Time" by Trent Roman
- "James and the Dark Grimoire" by Kevin Lauderdale
- "Hellstone and Brimfire" by Doug Goodman
- "Star Crossed" by Bennet Reilly
- "The Covenant" by Kim Paffenroth
- "The Hindenburg Manifesto" by Lee Clark Zumpe
- "In Our Darkest Hour" by Steven Graham
- "Blood Bags and Tentacles" by DL Snell
- "Bubba Cthulhu's Last Stand" by Lisa Hilton
- "Turf" by Richard D. Moore
- "The Menagerie" by Ben Thomas
- "The Patriot" by John Goodrich
- "The Shadow over Las Vegas" by John Claude Smith
- "Locked Room" by CJ Henderson

== Cthulhu Unbound 2 ==
Cthulhu Unbound 2
- Editors: John Sunseri and Thom Brannan
- Language: English
- Genre: Fantasy, horror
- Publisher: Permuted Press
- Publication date: July 31, 2009
- Publication place: United States
- Media type: Print (paperback)
- Pages: 276
- ISBN: 978-1-934861-14-1
- Preceded by: Cthulhu Unbound
- Followed by: Cthulhu Unbound 3

Cthulhu Unbound 2 was published by Permuted Press on July 31, 2009. It was edited by John Sunseri and Thom Brannan. The volume is a "cross-genre" anthology, telling Lovecraft-inspired stories that are comedies, space operas, hardboiled noir, etc. Cover art by Michael Dashow.

=== Contents ===
The contents are:

- "Passing Down" by Inez Schaechterle
- "The Tenants of Ladywell Manor" by Willie Meikle
- "The Hunters Within the Corners" by Douglas P. Wojtowicz
- "Surely You Joust" by Patrick Thomas
- "References in Cthonic, Eldritch, Roiling Creations are Recondite" by Warren Tusk
- "New Fish" by Kiwi Courters
- "Tomb on a Dead Moon" by Tim Curran
- "The Long, Deep Dream" by Peter Clines
- "Santiago Contra el Culto de Cthulhu" by Mark Zirbel
- "Stomach Acid" by David Conyers and Brian M. Sammons
- "Sleeping Monster Futures" by Brandon Alspaugh
- "Nemo at R'lyeh" by Joshua Reynolds
- "What's a Few Tentacles Among Friends?" by Sheila Crosby
- "An Incident Occurring in the Huachuca Mountains, West of Tombstone" by Gary Vehar
- "Abomination With Rice" by Rhys Hughes

== Cthulhu's Reign ==
Cthulhu's Reign
- Editor: Darrell Schweitzer
- Language: English
- Genre: Fantasy, Horror short stories
- Publisher: DAW
- Publication date: April 2010
- Publication place: United States
- Media type: Print (paperback)
- Pages: 309
- ISBN: 978-0-7564-0616-5

Cthulhu's Reign was published by DAW in April 2010. It was edited by Darrell Schweitzer. The volume's twist is that the dreaded revival of the fearsome "Great Old Ones" who once ruled the Earth is not a future possibility, but an event that has actually come to pass.

=== Contents ===
The contents are:

- "Introduction" by Darrell Schweitzer
- "The Walker in the Cemetery" by Ian Watson
- "Sanctuary" by Don Webb
- "Her Acres of Pastoral Playground" by Mike Allen
- "Spherical Trigonometry" by Ken Asamatsu
- "What Brings the Void" by Will Murray
- "The New Pauline Corpus" by Matt Cardin
- "Ghost Dancing" by Darrell Schweitzer
- "This Is How the World Ends" by John R. Fultz
- "The Shallows" by John Langan
- "Such Bright and Risen Madness in Our Names" by Jay Lake
- "The Seals of New R'lyeh" by Gregory Frost
- "The Holocaust of Ecstasy" by Brian Stableford
- "Vastation" by Laird Barron
- "Nothing Personal" by Richard A. Lupoff
- "Remnants" by Fred Chappell

== Historical Lovecraft ==
Historical Lovecraft
- Editors: Silvia Moreno-Garcia and Paula R. Stiles
- Cover artist: Paco Rico Torres
- Language: English
- Genre: Fantasy, horror
- Publisher: Innsmouth Free Press
- Publication date: April 20, 2011
- Publication place: United States
- Media type: E-book and Print (paperback)
- Pages: 280
- ISBN: 978-0-98668-643-6

Historical Lovecraft was published by Innsmouth Free Press on April 20, 2011. It was edited by Silvia Moreno-Garcia and Paula R. Stiles. Subtitled Tales of Horror Through Time, this is a history-themed anthology with stories taking place in various time periods, chronologically ordered into three sections: "Ancient History", "Middle Ages" and "Modern Era". The theme was partly inspired by the editors' historical interests and partly from Lovecraft's extrapolations of frightening pasts for humanity that extended back to the Paleolithic and even further. This was a popular theme in Weird Tales at the time and used by many other authors, including Robert E. Howard and Clark Ashton Smith.

“Found in a Trunk from Extremadura” was first published as "Manuscrit trouvé dans une malle d'Estrémadure" in the French anthology HPL 2007. This is its first appearance in an English translation. All other stories are original to this anthology.

=== Contents ===
The contents are:

- "Introduction" by Silvia Moreno-Garcia and Paula R. Stiles
- "Ancient History"
  - "The God Lurking in Stone" by Andrew Dombalagian
  - "The Seeder From the Stars" by Julio Toro San Martin
  - "Deus ex Machina" by Nathaniel Katz
  - "If Only to Taste Her Again" by E. Catherine Tobler
  - "Shadows of the Darkest Jade" by Sarah Hans
  - "The Chronicle of Aliyat Son of Aliyat" by Alter S. Reiss
- "Middle Ages"
  - "Silently, Without Cease" by |Daniel Mills
  - "The Good Bishop Pays the Price" by Martha Hubbard
  - "The Saga of Hilde Ansgardóttir" by Jesse Bullington
  - "An Interrupted Sacrifice" by Mae Empson
  - "Pralaya: The Disaster" by Y.W. Purnomosidhi
  - "The City of Ropes" by Albert Tucher
- "Modern Era"
  - "Inquisitor" by William Meikle
  - "The Far Deep" by Joshua Reynolds
  - "City of Witches" by Regina Allen
  - "Ahuizotl" by Nelly Geraldine García-Rosas
  - "An Idol for Emiko" by Travis Heermann
  - "The Infernal History of the Ivybridge Twins" by Molly Tanzer
  - "Black Leaves" by Mason Ian Bundschuh
  - "The Second Theft of Alhazred's Manuscript" by Bradley H. Sinor
  - "Ngiri's Catch" by Aaron Polson
  - "What Hides and What Returns" by Bryan Thao Worra
  - "Black Hill" by Orrin Gray
  - "Amundsen's Last Run" by Nathalie Boisard-Beudin
  - "Red Star, Yellow Sign" by Leigh Kimmel
  - "Found in a Trunk from Extremadura" by Meddy Ligner

== The Book of Cthulhu ==
The Book of Cthulhu
- Editor: Ross E. Lockhart
- Language: English
- Genre: Fantasy, horror
- Publisher: Night Shade Books
- Publication date: September 2011
- Publication place: United States
- Media type: Print (paperback)
- Pages: 540
- ISBN: 978-1-59780-232-1

The Book of Cthulhu was published by Night Shade Books in September 2011. It was edited by Ross E. Lockhart.

Two stories, Laird Barron's "The Men from Porlock" and John Hornor Jacobs's "The Dream of the Fisherman's Wife", are original to the volume.

=== Contents ===
The contents are:

- "Introduction" by Ross E. Lockhart
- "Andromeda among the Stones" by Caitlín R. Kiernan
- "The Tugging" by Ramsey Campbell
- "A Colder War" by Charles Stross
- "The Unthinkable" by Bruce Sterling
- "Flash Frame" by Silvia Moreno-Garcia
- "Some Buried Memory" by W. H. Pugmire
- "The Infernal History of the Ivybridge Twins" by Molly Tanzer
- "Fat Face" by Michael Shea
- "Shoggoths in Bloom" by Elizabeth Bear
- "Black Man with a Horn" by T. E. D. Klein
- "Than Curse the Darkness" by David Drake
- "Jerobam Henley's Debt" by Charles R. Saunders
- "Nethescurial" by Thomas Ligotti
- "Calimari Curls" by Kage Baker
- "Jihad over Innsmouth" by Edward Morris
- "Bad Sushi" by Cherie Priest
- "The Dream of the Fisherman's Wife" by John Hornor Jacobs
- "The Doom that Came to Innsmouth" by Brian McNaughton
- "Lost Stars" by Ann K. Schwader
- "The Oram County Whoosit" by Steve Duffy
- "The Crawling Sky" by Joe R. Lansdale
- "The Fairground Horror" by Brian Lumley
- "Cinderlands" by Tim Pratt
- "Lord of the Land" by Gene Wolfe
- "To Live and Die in Arkham" by Joseph S. Pulver
- "The Shallows" by John Langan
- "The Men from Porlock" by Laird Barron

== New Cthulhu: The Recent Weird ==
New Cthulhu: The Recent Weird
- Editor: Paula Guran
- Language: English
- Genre: Fantasy, horror
- Publisher: Prime Books
- Publication date: November 2011
- Publication place: United States
- Media type: Print (paperback)
- Pages: 526
- ISBN: 978-1-60701-289-4

New Cthulhu: The Recent Weird was published by Prime Books in November 2011. It was edited by Paula Guran. The volume collects stories by those Guran identifies as "New Lovecraftians" who, Guran says, "re-imagine, re-energize, renew, re-set, and make Lovecraftian concepts relevant for today."

=== Contents ===
- "Introduction" by Paula Guran
- "Pickman's Other Model (1929)" by Caitlín R. Kiernan
- "Fair Exchange" by Michael Marshall Smith
- "Mr. Gaunt" by John Langan
- "The Vicar of R'lyeh" by Marc Laidlaw
- "The Crevasse" by Dale Bailey and Nathan Ballingrud
- "Bad Sushi" by Cherie Priest
- "Old Virginia" by Laird Barron
- "The Dude Who Collected Lovecraft" by Nick Mamatas and Tim Pratt
- "The Oram County Whoosit" by Steve Duffy
- "The Fungal Stain" by W. H. Pugmire
- "A Study in Emerald" by Neil Gaiman
- "Buried in the Sky" by John Shirley
- "Bringing Helena Back" by Sarah Monette
- "Take Me to the River" by Paul J. McAuley
- "The Essayist in the Wilderness" by William Browning Spencer
- "The Disciple" by David Barr Kirtley
- "Shoggoths in Bloom" by Elizabeth Bear
- "Cold Water Survival" by Holly Phillips
- "The Great White Bed" by Don Webb
- "Lesser Demons" by Norman Partridge
- "Grinding Rock" by Cody Goodfellow
- "Details" by China Miéville
- "Another Fish Story" by Kim Newman
- "Head Music" by Lon Prater
- "Tsathoggua" by Michael Shea
- "Mongoose" by Elizabeth Bear and Sarah Monette
- "A Colder War" by Charles Stross

== Black Wings ==
Black Wings
- Editor: S. T. Joshi
- Cover artist: Jason Van Hollander
- Language: English
- Genre: Fantasy, horror
- Publisher: PS Publishing
- Publication date: May 1, 2010
- Publication place: United States
- Media type: Hardcover; reprint in paperback and e-book
- Pages: 505

Black Wings was published by PS Publishing on May 1, 2010. It was edited by S. T. Joshi. In this anthology as editor, Joshi's goal was to assemble a collection of stories influenced by the works and core tenets of H. P. Lovecraft, while avoiding the rigid structure of the Cthulhu Mythos as defined by August Derleth and others. In his introduction, Joshi states that "It is to be noted how many stories in this anthology do not mention a single such name from the Lovecraft corpus; and yet they remain intimately Lovecraftian on a far deeper level. Indeed, the very notion of writing a "pastiche" that does little but rework Lovecraft's own themes and ideas have now become passé in serious weird writing". Three of the stories are direct or indirect sequels to Lovecraft's story "Pickman's Model" and Lovecraft himself appears as a character in several tales. Only one story, Stanley C. Sargent's "The Black Brat of Dunwich" is a reprint, all other stories are original to this anthology.

The book was republished by Titan Books on March 20, 2012. Their reprint changed the title to Black Wings of Cthulhu, a practice Titan continued for all their reprints of the Black Wings series.

=== Contents ===
The contents are:

- "Introduction" by S. T. Joshi
- "Pickman's Other Model (1929)" by Caitlin R. Kiernan
- "Desert Dreams" by Donald R. Burleson
- "Engravings" by Joseph S. Pulver Jr.
- "Copping Squid" by Michael Shea
- "Passing Spirits" by Sam Gafford
- "The Broadsword" by Laird Barron
- "Usurped" by William Browning Spencer
- "Denker's Book" by David J. Schow
- "Inhabitants of Wraithwood" by W.H. Pugmire
- "The Dome" by Millie L. Burleson
- "Rotterdam" by Nicholas Royle
- "Tempting Providence" by Jonathan Thomas
- "Howling in the Dark" by Darrell Schweitzer
- "The Truth about Pickman" by Brian Stableford
- "Tunnels" by Philip Haldeman
- "The Correspondence of Cameron Thaddeus Nash" annotated by Ramsey Campbell
- "Violence, Child of Trust" by Michael Cisco
- "Lesser Demons" by Norman Partridge
- "An Eldritch Matter" by Adam Niswander
- "Substitution" by Michael Marshall Smith
- "Susie" by Jason Van Hollander

== The Book of Cthulhu II ==
The Book of Cthulhu II
- Editor: Ross E. Lockhart
- Language: English
- Genre: Fantasy, horror
- Publisher: Night Shade Books
- Publication date: October 2012
- Publication place: United States
- Media type: Print (paperback)
- Pages: 426
- ISBN: 978-1-59780-435-6

The Book of Cthulhu II was published by Night Shade Books in October 2012. It was edited by Ross E. Lockhart.

Three stories, Paul Tobin's "The Drowning at Lake Henpin", Christopher Reynaga's "I Only Am Escaped Alone to Tell Thee" and Laird Barron's "Hand of Glory" are original to the volume.

=== Contents ===
The contents are:

- "Introduction" by Ross E. Lockhart
- "Shoggoth's Old Peculiar" by Neil Gaiman
- "Nor the Demons Down Under the Sea" by Caitlín R. Kiernan
- "This Is How the World Ends" by John R. Fultz
- "The Drowning at Lake Henpin" by Paul Tobin
- "The Ocean and All Its Devices" by William Browning Spencer
- "Take Your Daughters to Work" by Livia Llewellyn
- "The Big Fish" by Kim Newman
- "Rapture of the Deep" by Cody Goodfellow
- "Once More, from the Top" by Adam Scott Glancy
- "The Hour of the Tortoise" by Molly Tanzer
- "I Only Am Escaped Alone to Tell Thee" by Christopher Reynaga
- "Objects from the Gilman-Waite Collection" by Ann K. Schwader
- "Of Melei, of Ulthar" by Gord Sellar
- "A Gentleman from Mexico" by Mark Samuels
- "The Hands That Reek and Smoke" by W. H. Pugmire
- "Akropolis" by Matt Wallace
- "Boojum" by Elizabeth Bear and Sarah Monette
- "The Nyarlathotep Event" by Jonathan Wood
- "The Black Brat of Dunwich" by Stanley C. Sargent
- "The Terror from the Depths" by Fritz Leiber
- "Black Hill" by Orrin Grey
- "The God of Dark Laughter" by Michael Chabon
- "Sticks" by Karl Edward Wagner
- "Hand of Glory" by Laird Barron

== Cthulhu Unbound 3 ==
Cthulhu Unbound 3
- Editors: Brian M. Sammons and David Conyers
- Language: English
- Genre: Science fiction, horror
- Publisher: Permuted Press
- Publication date: October 9, 2012
- Publication place: United States
- Media type: E-book and Print (paperback)
- Pages: 277
- Preceded by: Cthulhu Unbound 2

Cthulhu Unbound 3 was published by Permuted Press on October 9, 2012. It was edited by Brian M. Sammons and David Conyers. The volume is a "cross-genre" anthology of four Cthulhu Mythos novellas.

=== Contents ===
The contents are:

- "Unseen Empire" by Cody Goodfellow
- "MirrorrorriM" by D.L. Snell
- "Nemesis Theory" by Tim Curran
- "The R'lyeh Singularity" by David Conyers and Brian M. Sammons

== Lovecraft's Monsters ==
Lovecraft's Monsters
- Editor: Ellen Datlow
- Language: English
- Genre: Fantasy, Horror
- Publisher: Tachyon Publications
- Publication date: April 15, 2014
- Publication place: United States
- Media type: Print (paperback)
- Pages: 432
- ISBN: 978-1-61696-121-3

Lovecraft's Monsters was published by Tachyon Publications on April 15, 2014. It was edited by Ellen Datlow.

The volume is a "cross-genre" anthology of Lovecraft-inspired stories and poems, with original art by World Fantasy Award–winning artist John Coulthart. Datlow's stated goal with the anthology was "to avoid the pastiches...to use stories that have not been overly reprinted...[and] showcase Lovecraftian-influenced stories by at least some authors not known for that kind of story." Only one story, John Langan's "Children of the Fang" is original to the volume.

=== Contents ===
The contents are:

- "Foreword" by Stefan Dziemianowicz
- "Introduction" by Ellen Datlow
- "Only the End of the World Again" by Neil Gaiman
- "Bulldozer" by Laird Barron
- "Red Goat Black Goat" by Nadia Bulkin
- "The Same Deep Waters as You" by Brian Hodge
- "A Quarter to Three" by Kim Newman
- "The Dappled Thing" by William Browning Spencer
- "Inelastic Collisions" by Elizabeth Bear
- "Remnants" by Fred Chappell
- "Love is Forbidden, We Croak and Howl" by Caitlín R. Kiernan
- "The Sect of the Idiot" by Thomas Ligotti
- "Jar of Salts" (poem) by Gemma Files
- "Black as the Pit From Pole to Pole" by Howard Waldrop and Steven Utley
- "Waiting at the Cross Roads Motel" by Steve Rasnic Tem
- "I’ve Come to Talk With You Again" by Karl Edward Wagner
- "The Bleeding Shadow" by Joe R. Lansdale
- "That of Which We Speak When We Speak of the Unspeakable" by Nick Mamatas
- "Haruspicy" (poem) by Gemma Files
- "Children of the Fang" by John Langan
- "Monster Index" by Rachel Fagundes

== New Cthulhu 2: More Recent Weird ==
New Cthulhu 2: More Recent Weird
- Editor: Paula Guran
- Language: English
- Genre: Fantasy, horror
- Publisher: Prime Books
- Publication date: April 2015
- Publication place: United States
- Media type: Print (paperback)
- Pages: 480
- ISBN: 978-1-60701-450-8

New Cthulhu 2: More Recent Weird was published by Prime Books in April 2015. It was edited by Paula Guran. The volume is a sequel to Guran's 2011 anthology New Cthulhu: The Recent Weird.

=== Contents ===
- "Introduction" by Paula Guran
- "The Same Deep Waters as You" by Brian Hodge
- "Mysterium Tremendum" by Laird Barron
- "The Transition of Elizabeth Haskings" by Caitlín R. Kiernan
- "Bloom" by John Langan
- "At Home with Azathoth" by John Shirley
- "The Litany of Earth" by Ruthanna Emrys
- "Necrotic Cove" by Lois H. Gresh
- "On Ice" by Simon Strantzas
- "The Wreck of the Charles Dexter Ward" by Elizabeth Bear and Sarah Monette
- "All My Love, A Fishhook" by Helen Marshall
- "The Doom That Came to Devil Reef" by Don Webb
- "Momma Durtt" by Michael Shea
- "They Smell of Thunder" by W. H. Pugmire
- "The Song of Sighs" by Angela Slatter
- "Fishwife" by Carrie Vaughn
- "In the House of the Hummingbirds" by Silvia Moreno-Garcia
- "Who Looks Back?" by Kyla Ward
- "Equoid" by Charles Stross
- "The Boy Who Followed Lovecraft" by Marc Laidlaw

== Cthulhu Fhtagn! ==
Cthulhu Fhtagn!
- Editor: Ross E. Lockhart
- Cover artist: Adolfo Navarro
- Language: English
- Genre: Fantasy, Horror
- Publisher: Word Horde
- Publication date: August 15, 2015
- Publication place: United States
- Media type: E-book and Print (paperback)
- Pages: 324
- ISBN: 978-1-93990-513-0

Cthulhu Fhtagn! was published by[Word Horde on August 15, 2015. It was edited by Ross E. Lockhart. This anthology is a follow-up to Lockhart's previous books The Book of Cthulhu and The Book of Cthulhu 2 but, unlike them, contains only previously unpublished stories. The stories are a mix of the serious and humorous and cross many genres. Some of the stories are based on specific works by H. P. Lovecraft. The title is taken from a chant spoken in Lovecraft's 1926 story "The Call of Cthulhu" and, in Lockhart's interpretation, is taken to mean "House of Cthulhu".

There are no reprints in this anthology; all the stories appear here for the first time.

=== Contents ===
The contents are:

- "Introduction: In His House at R'lyeh..." by Ross E. Lockhart
- "The Lightning Splitter" by Walter Greatshell
- "Dead Canyons" by Ann K. Schwader
- "Delirium Sings at the Maelstrom Window" by Michael Griffin
- "Into Ye Smoke-Wreath'd World of Dream" by W. H. Pugmire
- "The Lurker in the Shadows" by Nathan Carson
- "The Insectivore" by Orrin Grey
- "The Body Shop" by Richard Lee Byers
- "On a Kansas Plain" by Michael J. Martinez
- "The Prince of Lyghes" by Anya Martin
- "The Curious Death of Sir Arthur Turnbridge" by G. D. Falksen
- "Aerkheim's Horror" by Christine Morgan
- "Return of the Prodigy" by T.E. Grau
- "The Curse of the Old Ones" by Molly Tanzer and Jesse Bullington
- "Love Will Save You" by Cameron Pierce
- "Assemblage Point" by Scott R. Jones
- "The Return of Sarnath" by Gord Sellar
- "The Long Dark" by Wendy N. Wagner
- "Green Revolution" by Cody Goodfellow
- "Don't Make Me Assume My Ultimate Form" by Laird Barron

== She Walks in Shadows ==
She Walks in Shadows
- Editors: Silvia Moreno-Garcia and Paula R. Stiles
- Cover artist: Sarah K. Diesel
- Language: English
- Genre: Fantasy, horror
- Publisher: Innsmouth Free Press
- Publication date: October 2015
- Publication place: United States
- Media type: E-book and Print (paperback)
- Pages: 303
- ISBN: 1927990165

She Walks in Shadows was published by Innsmouth Free Press on October 13, 2015. It was edited by Silvia Moreno-Garcia and Paula R. Stiles. Its publication was funded by a successful Indiegogo campaign and contains entirely original stories, all of them written by women. Writing for The Mary Sue, Jessica Lachenal stated that it "could be one of the neatest Lovecraftian anthologies to date."

=== Contents ===
The contents are:

- "Bitter Perfume" by Laura Blackwell
- "Violet Is the Color of Your Energy" by Nadia Bulkin
- "Body to Body to Body" by Selena Chambers
- "Magna Mater" by Arinn Dembo
- "De Deabus Minoribus Exterioris Theomagicae" by Jilly Dreadful
- "Hairwork" by Gemma Files
- "The Head of T'la-yub" by Nelly Geraldine García-Rosas (translated by Silvia Moreno-Garcia)
- "Bring the Moon to Me" by Amelia Gorman
- "Chosen" by Lyndsey Holder
- "Eight Seconds" by Pandora Hope
- "Cthulhu of the Dead Sea" by Inkeri Kontro
- "Turn Out the Lights" by Penelope Love
- "The Adventurer's Wife" by Premee Mohamed
- "Notes Found in a Decommissioned Asylum, December 1961" by Sharon Mock
- "The Eye of Juno" by Eugenie Mora
- "Ammutseba Rising" by Ann K. Schwader
- "Cypress God" by Rodopi Sisamis
- "Lavinia's Wood" by Angela Slatter
- "The Opera Singer" by Priya Sridhar
- "Provenance" by Benjanun Sriduangkaew
- "The Thing in the Cheerleading Squad" by Molly Tanzer
- "Lockbox" by E. Catherine Tobler
- "When She Quickens" by Mary Turzillo
- "Shub-Niggurath's Witnesses" by Valerie Valdes
- "Queen of a New America" by Wendy N. Wagner

== Cthulhu Deep Down Under ==
An anthology set in Australia, Cthulhu Deep Down Under Volume 1, edited by Steve Proposch, Christopher Sequeira, and Bryce J. Stevens, was published in Melbourne in 2017. This volume was preceded by a boutique crowdfunded edition titled Cthulhu Deep Down Under which had multiple colour illustrations by a variety of artists, and slightly varying contents from Cthulhu Deep Down Under 1.

Cthulhu Deep Down Under Volume 2 followed in 2018.

Subsequently, Cthulhu Deep Down Under Volume 3 has been published. Additionally, the anthology Cthulhu: Land of the Long White Cloud contains Lovecraftian stories set in New Zealand, or by New Zealand-based writers. A follow-up anthology also published by IFWG Publishing is Into the Cthulhuverse.
