= Cthulhu's Dark Cults =

Cthulhu’s Dark Cults
- Editor: David Conyers
- Cover artist: Steven Gilberts
- Language: English
- Series: Call of Cthulhu Fiction
- Genre: Horror
- Publisher: Chaosium
- Publication date: May 6, 2010
- Publication place: United States
- Media type: Print (paperback)
- Pages: 256 pp
- ISBN: 1-56882-235-9
- OCLC: 223818171

Cthulhu's Dark Cults is an anthology edited by David Conyers, containing ten Cthulhu Mythos short stories set in Chaosium's Call of Cthulhu role-playing game setting. All the stories take place during the 1920s and 1930s, the era in which the game is set.

== Introduction ==
All ten stories in Cthulhu’s Dark Cults are linked by Cthulhu Mythos cults and characters that first appeared in Call of Cthulhu gaming supplements such as Masks of Nyarlathotep, Horror on the Orient Express, Shadows of Yog-Sothoth, The Fungi from Yuggoth, Secrets of Kenya, Secrets of New York and others. The ten stories are:

- "The Eternal Chinaman" by John Sunseri
- "Captains of Industry" by John Goodrich
- "Perfect Skin" by David Witteveen
- "Covenant of Darkness" by William Jones
- "The Whisper of Ancient Secrets" by Penelope Love
- "Old Ghost" by Peter A. Worthy
- "The Nature of Faith" by Oscar Rios
- "'The Devil’s Diamonds" by Cody Goodfellow
- "Requiem for the Burning God" by Shane Jiraiya Cummings
- "Sister of the Sands" by David Conyers

== Story summaries ==
The book is introduced by David Conyers and dedicated to the memory of Keith Herber. The plot summaries of the ten stories with references to the gaming supplements that influenced each tale are:

The Eternal Chinaman: In San Francisco 1920, a stage magician hires his brother to protect him from a Tong-style cult. The story features Lang Fu who first appeared in the gaming supplement The Fungi from Yuggoth. The name of the story is derived from a description in H.P. Lovecraft's tale The Call of Cthulhu in reference to a cult of sorcerers who live in the mountains of China planning the downfall of humanity.

Captains of Industry: In Boston 1921, union members of a washing machine manufacturing company break into the lodge of a secretive order called the Hermetic Order of the Silver Twilight, hoping to gather incriminating evidence on their boss who is a member with the Lodge so they have a bargaining point to improve their working conditions. The story features Carl Stanford and John Scott, who first appeared in the gaming supplement Shadows of Yog-sothoth, and Ambrose Mogens, who first appeared in Secrets of New York.

Perfect Skin: In Istanbul 1922, a British couple are enjoying their honeymoon until the husband goes missing, presumably kidnapped by the Brotherhood of the Skin, a cult that first appeared in the gaming supplement Horror on the Orient Express.

Covenant of Darkness: In New York City 1923, Columbia University professor Rudolph Pearson crosses paths with a cult of ghouls that have been in existence in caverns beneath the city for as long as there have been human settlements on the surface. The story features a cult that appeared in Secrets of New York. The protagonist of this tale also appears in the collection The Strange Cases of Rudolph Pearson (Chaosium, 2007).

The Whisper of Ancient Secrets: In Victoria, Australia 1925, an insane inventor hopes to travel to the centre of the universe and the Outer God Azathoth before the machinations of the Cult of the Sand Bat ruin his plans. The story features Robert Huston, who first appeared in the gaming supplement Masks of Nyarlathotep.

Old Ghost: In Shanghai 1926, a priest befriends a group of expatriates who are secretly warring against the Order of the Bloated Woman. The story features Ho Fong, who first appeared in the gaming supplement Masks of Nyarlathotep.

The Nature of Faith: In Dunwich 1927, a professor of ancient history befriends a young local girl who leads him on an expedition into the wild hills of Massachusetts searching for ancient Celtic coins that are not supposed to exist in the region. The story features the Believers cult appearing in the gaming supplement H.P. Lovecraft’s Dunwich.

The Devil's Diamonds: In Kenya 1930, a British-run diamond mine is held hostage by the Cult of the Bloody Tongue who plan to use the site to summon an aspect of their god Nyarlathotep. The story features M’Weru, who first appeared in the gaming supplement Masks of Nyarlathotep.

Requiem for the Burning God: In Peru 1932, a group of mercenaries is hired to protect an Andean mine from rebel forces, only to discover that their employers are unearthing an alien god trapped in the mountains. The story features the cult-like organisation New World Industries (NWI), which first appeared in the gaming supplement The Fungi from Yuggoth and later in At Your Door and Unseen Masters.

Sister of the Sands: In Egypt 1933, a spy discovers thousands of dead cultists in the sand dunes of the Sahara and a strange woman who has walked unscathed from the carnage. The story features Omar Shakti and the Brotherhood of the Black Pharaoh, which first appeared in the gaming supplement Masks of Nyarlathotep, and Jamal Alhazred, who first appeared in Secrets of Kenya.
