= Curse of Cthulhu =

Collection of horror role-playing adventures

- Cover art by Nick Smith
- Designers: Keith Herber
- Publishers: Chaosium
- Publication: 1990; 35 years ago
- Genres: Horror
- Systems: Basic Role-Playing

Curse of Cthulhu is a collection of adventures published by Chaosium in 1990 for the horror role-playing game Call of Cthulhu, itself based on the works of H.P. Lovecraft.

== Contents ==
Curse of Cthulhu is a collection of four adventures for Call of Cthulhu. Three of the adventures are taken from previous Chaosium books:

- "Fungi from Yuggoth", a reprint of the entire 1984 book of the same title
- "The Haunted House", an adventure reprinted from Trail of Tsathogghua (1984), meant to act as an introductory adventure for inexperienced players before playing "Fungi from Yuggoth"
- "The Wail of the Witch", a short introductory adventure originally published in Different Worlds

The book also includes an original adventure, "The Case", which is based upon Lovecraft's story The Case of Charles Dexter Ward.

All of the adventures have been revised to conform with the rules of the fourth edition of Call of Cthulhu.

The book includes 18 pages of perforated pull-out player handouts, a gatefold color plate, and a variant character sheet.

== Publication history ==
Chaosium first released the horror role-playing game Call of Cthulhu in 1981, and regularly refreshed it with new editions containing revamped rules. The fourth edition's release in 1989 sparked a line of products that game historian Stu Horvath called "the golden age for the line". One of these products was Curse of Cthulhu, written by Keith Herber, with cover art by Nick Smith, interior art by Earl Geier, Chris Marrinan, Steve Purcell, and Nick Smith, and cartography by Michael Blum, Tadashi Ehara, and Carol Triplett-Smith.

== Reception ==
Wayne Ligon reviewed Curse of Cthulhu in White Wolf #26 (April/May, 1991), rating it a 3 out of 5 and stating that "Curse of Cthulhu is very good on the whole, with 'Fungi' being the star attraction. The other adventures are good, but others could have been introduced to expand the main feature into a book-length adventure."

== Reviews ==
- The Annotated Unspeakable Oath (Issue 1 - 1993)
