= David Conyers =

Australian author

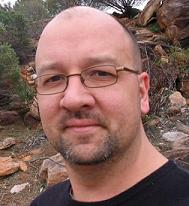
- Born: 30 May 1971 (age 55); Sydney, Australia
- Education: University of Melbourne
- Occupation: Writer
- Writing career
- Period: mid 2000s-present
- Genres: Science fiction, horror

David Conyers (born 30 May 1971) is an Australian author. Conyers writes predominantly science fiction and Lovecraftian horror.

== Early life and education ==
Conyers was born in Sydney. Most of his childhood was spent in the Adelaide Hills, before moving to Melbourne. There he achieved a bachelor's degree in civil engineering at the University of Melbourne in 1993.

After several years working on remote outback construction sites in Western Australia, and extensive travel in Africa and Europe in 1995, he settled back in Melbourne, taking up a career in marketing and corporate communications. He moved to Adelaide in 2005.

== Writing career ==
Conyers published his first story Vanishing Curves in the Book of Dark Wisdom in 2004 and his first novel, The Spiraling Worm co-authored with United States horror writer John Sunseri, was published by Chaosium in 2007. The novel went on to receive an Honourable Mention for Best Australian Horror Novel in the 12th Annual Aurealis Award and the 2007 Australian Shadows Award.

His science fiction short stories have been nominated for the Aurealis Award, the Australian Shadows Award, the Ditmar Award and the Aeon Award, the last presented by the Irish speculative fiction magazine Albedo One. In 2007 he won the Australian Horror Writers Association's Flash Fiction Award for his story Homo Canis and in 2011 won the Short Story category for the same award for Winds of Nzambi co-authored with David Kernot.

Between 2004 and 2007, David was the Associate Editor of the Book of Dark Wisdom. At the same time he was writing and editing role-playing games, predominately for the Call of Cthulhu setting, based on the works of H. P. Lovecraft and published by Chaosium Inc. He is currently a reviews editor and interviewer with Albedo One.

== Bibliography ==
=== The Harrison Peel series ===
Modern-day Lovecraftian horror novel series set in the world of spies, government conspiracies and cosmic monsters.

- The Spiraling Worm (2007), with John Sunseri, ISBN 1-56882-212-X. Honourable Mention Best Horror Novel for the Aurealis Award (2007) and the Australian Shadows Award (2007).
- The Eye of Infinity (2011).

=== Edited anthologies ===
- Cthulhu's Dark Cults (2010), ISBN 1-56882-235-9
- Cthulhu Unbound 3 (2012) with Brian M. Sammons

=== Anthology appearances ===
- False Containment (2005), Horrors Beyond, ed. William Jones, Elder Signs Press. Reprinted in The Spiraling Worm, Chaosium Inc.
- Aftermath (2006), Agog! Ripping Reads, ed. Cat Sparks, Agog! Press. Short-listed for the Aurealis Award (2006) and Ditmar Award (2007). Reprinted in Apex Online ed. Jason Sizemore.
- Regrowth (2006), Arkham Tales, ed. William Jones, Chaosium Inc.
- Outside, Looking In (2006), Hardboiled Cthulhu, ed. James Ambuehl, Elder Signs Press.
- As Above, So Below (2007), Secrets of Kenya, Chaosium Inc.
- Made of Meat (2007), The Spiraling Worm, Chaosium Inc.
- Impossible Object (2007), The Spiraling Worm, Chaosium Inc.
- Weapon Grade (2007), The Spiraling Worm, Chaosium Inc.
- The Spiraling Worm (2007) with John Sunseri, The Spiraling Worm, Chaosium Inc.
- Subtle Invasion (2007), The Black Book of Horror, ed. Charles Black, Mortbury Press. Short-listed for the Australian Shadows Award (2007). Reprinted in Australian Dark Fantasy & Horror Volume 3, ed. Angela Challis, Brimstone Press (2009) and in Best New Tales of the Apocalypse, Permuted Press (Forthcoming).
- Soft Viscosity (2008), 2012, ed. Alisa Krasnostein and Ben Payne, Twelfth Planet Press. Short-listed for the Ditmar Award (2009).
- Hell's Ambassador (2008), Black Box, ed. Shane Jiraiya Cummings, Brimstone Press.
- Homo Canis (2008), 2008 Award Winning Australian Writing, ed. David Tenenbuam, Melbourne Books. Reprinted in Midnight Echo #2 (Australian Horror Writers Association, 2009).
- Six-Legged Shadows (2009) with Brian M Sammons, Monstrous, Permuted Press.
- The Lord of the Law (2009), The Fourth Black Book of Horror, Mortbury Press.
- Stomach Acid (2009) with Brian M Sammons, Cthulhu Unbound^{2}, ed. John Sunseri, Permuted Press.
- Sweet as Decay (2010) with David Witteveen, Macabre, ed. Angela Challis and Marty Young, Brimstone Press
- Dream Machine (2010), Scenes from the Second Storey, Morrigan Books. Short-listed for the Australian Shadows Award (2010).
- Sister of the Sands (2010), Cthulhu's Dark Cults, ed. David Conyers, Chaosium Inc.
- The Nightmare Dimension (2011), Rage Against the Night, ed. Shane Jiraiya Cummings, Brimstone Press
- The R'lyeh Singularity (2012) Cthulhu Unbound 3, Permuted Press.

=== Selected magazine appearances ===
- Vanishing Curves (2004), Book of Dark Wisdom #3, ed. William Jones, Elder Signs Press.
- Solvent Hunger (2005), Book of Dark Wisdom #5, ed. William Jones, Elder Signs Press.
- The Faceless Watchers (2005), Lovecraft's Weird Mysteries #10.
- Cactus (2008), Midnight Echo #1.
- Terraformer (2008), Andromeda Spaceways Inflight Magazine #37.
- Black Water (2009), Jupiter Magazine #24. Reprinted online at Albedo One.
- The Octagon (2009), Jupiter Magazine #26.
- Emergency Rebuild (2010), Andromeda Spaceways Inflight Magazine #43.
- The Uncertainty Bridge (2010), Jupiter Magazine #30.
- The Masked Messenger (2011) with John Goodrich, Andromeda Spaceways Inflight Magazine #52.
- Winds of Nzambi (2011) with David Kernot, Midnight Echo #6.
- The Advertising Imperative (2011), Ticon4.com.
- Expectant Green (2012) with John Kenny, Jupiter Magazine #35.

== Interviews ==
- Interview conducted with Innsmouth Free Press (2009)
- Interview conducted by Shane Jiraiya Cummings at OzHorrorScope (2007)
- Interview Snapshot 2007 conducted by Alisa Krasnostein for ASif (2007)
- Kemble, Gary (2007). "Interview". ABC News. Archived from the original on 13 July 2007.
- Interview conducted by Paul Maclean at Yog-Sothoth.com (2007)
- Half a Page with... David Conyers (2007), Southern Write, April 2007 Newsletter of the SA Writers' Centre, p. 7.
