= Arkham Tales =

Arkham Tales: Legends of the Haunted City
- Editor: William Jones
- Cover artist: Steven Gilberts
- Language: English
- Genre: Horror
- Publisher: Chaosium
- Pages: 288
- ISBN: 9781568821856
- OCLC: 144617957

Arkham Tales: Legends of the Haunted City is a 2006 Cthulhu Mythos anthology published by Chaosium. It is a shared universe anthology, meaning all the stories occur in the same fictional universe. The stories all take place in the fictional city of Arkham, Massachusetts, spanning a time period from 1873 to the present day. The stories all feature elements of the Cthulhu Mythos. The anthology is edited by William Jones.

== Contents ==
- "Mysterious Dan's Legacy" by Matthew Baugh
- "Vaughn's Diary" by Robert Vaughn
- "The Orb" by Tony Campbell
- "The Nether Collection" by Cody Goodfellow
- "Worms" by Pat Harrigan
- "They Thrive in Darkness" by Ron Shiflet
- "What Sorrows May Come" by Lee Clark Zumpe
- "Arkham Pets" by James Ambuehl
- "Small Ghost" by Michael Minnis
- "Burnt Tea" by Michael Dziesinski
- "Arkham Rain" by John Goodrich (YBF&H Honorable Mention)
- "Regrowth" by David Conyers
- "The Idea of Fear" by C.J. Henderson (YBF&H Honorable Mention)
- "Disconnected" by Brian M. Sammons (YBF&H Honorable Mention)
- "The Lady in the Grove" by Scott Lette
- "On Leave to Arkham" by Bill Bilstad
- "Geometry of the Soul" by Jason Andrew
