= Arie Bodek =

American particle physicist

- Education: MIT
- Title: George E. Pake Professor of Physics at the University of Rochester
- Awards: Panofsky Prize in Experimental Particle Physics (2004)

Arie Bodek is an American experimental particle physicist and the George E. Pake Professor of Physics at the University of Rochester.

Bodek was awarded the 2004 American Physical Society W.K.H. Panofsky Prize in Experimental Particle Physics for his "broad, sustained, and insightful contributions to elucidating the structure of the nucleon, using a wide variety of probes, tools, and methods at many laboratories."

== Biography ==
Bodek received his B.S. in physics in 1968 from the Massachusetts Institute of Technology, and his Ph.D. in physics in 1972 also from MIT. For his Ph.D., he worked under Henry Kendall and Jerome Friedman on the MIT-SLAC deep inelastic electron scattering experiments that provided evidence for the quark structure of matter. His doctoral thesis provided some of the evidence of the quark's existence that was the basis for the 1990 Nobel Prize in Physics. The 1990 Nobel Prize in Physics was awarded to Friedman, Kendall, and Taylor for these experiments.

Bodek was a postdoctoral associate at MIT from 1972 to 1974 and a Robert E. Millikan Fellow at Caltech from 1974 to 1977. Bodek joined the University of Rochester as an assistant professor of physics in 1977. He was promoted to associate professor in 1980 and to professor in 1987. Bodek was appointed as an Alfred P. Sloan Fellow (1979–81); NSF-JSPS Fellow, KEK, Japan (1986); and Fellow of the American Physical Society in 1985. He served as a project director at the Department of Energy from 1990 to 1991. Bodek served as the associate chair from 1995 to 1998 and then as the chair of the department of physics and astronomy at the University of Rochester from 1998 to 2007. He served on the editorial board of the European Physical Journal C. In 2005, he was named George E. Pake Professor of physics at the University of Rochester.

Bodek's current research is in the physics of W's, Z's, Dileptons and on the Higgs Boson project at the CDF at Fermilab and the CMS at the Large Hadron Collider. He also researches neutrino physics and neutrino oscillations at CCFR/NuTeV/ MINERVA at Fermilab, deep inelastic scattering and nucleon structure at JUPITER at Jefferson Lab, and quark distributions in nuclei. In the area of instrumentation, Bodek's research is in the area of scintillating tile and optical-fiber hadron calorimeters. He served as the co-spokesperson of the Jefferson Lab JUPITER program on experiment E04-001. In CDF, his group has the CDF plug upgrade hadron calorimeter. For CMS, his group has constructed the HCAL hadron calorimeter. Both calorimeters were constructed using tile-fiber technology.

Arie Bodek is married to author Lois H. Gresh.

== Publications ==
Bodek is an author of more than 700 publications. He is listed by the Institute for Scientific Information as an ISI highly cited researcher whose publications are most often cited in academic journals over the past decade.

The following are a few selected publications:

- Vector and Axial Nucleon Form Factors: A Duality Based Parametrization A. Bodek, S. Avvakumov, R. Bradford and H. Budd Eur. Phys. J. C 53, 349-354 (2008)
- Modeling deep inelastic cross sections in the few GeV region. A. Bodek and U.K. Yang, Nuclear Physics B Proc. Suppl. 112, 20 (2002)
- IMPLICATIONS OF A 300-GEV/C TO 500-GEV/C Z-PRIME BOSON ON P ANTIP COLLIDER DATA AT S**(1/2) = 1.8-TEV. Arie Bodek and Ulrich Baur Eur. Phys. J. C 21, 607 (2001)
- STUDIES OF THE RESPONSE OF THE PROTOTYPE CMS HADRON CALORIMETER, INCLUDING MAGNETIC FIELD EFFECTS, TOPION, ELECTRON, AND MUON BEAMS. CMS-HCAL Collaboration (V.V. Abramov et al.).Nucl. Instrum. Methods A 457, 75 (2001)
- Measurement of d sigma / dM forward backward charge asymmetry for high mass Drell-Yan e+ e- pairs from p anti-p collisions at s**(1/2) =1.8-TeV. CDF Collaboration (T. Affolder et al.) Phys. Rev. Lett. 87, 131802 (2001)
