= The Compact Arkham Unveiled =

Tabletop horror role-playing game supplement

- Designers: Keith Herber; Mark Morrison; Richard Watts
- Publishers: Chaosium
- Publication: 1995; 30 years ago
- Genres: Horror
- Systems: Basic Role-Playing
- ISBN: 978-1568820491

The Compact Arkham Unveiled is a 1995 role-playing game supplement for Call of Cthulhu published by Chaosium.

== Contents ==
The Compact Arkham Unveiled is an update of the prior Arkham Unveiled without the adventure scenarios, and includes a gazetteer showing the town of Arkham as it appeared in the 1920s.

== Reception ==
Steve Faragher reviewed The Compact Arkham Unveiled for Arcane magazine, rating it a 9 out of 10 overall. Faragher comments that "If you're just starting up a campaign and you want to centre it around Arkham or have Arkham feature very prominently then this book will reward you hugely for any effort you put into it."
