= Cthulhu Companion =

Tabletop horror role-playing game supplement

Ghastly Adventures & Erudite Lore
- Cover art by Chris Marrinan
- Designers: Sandy Petersen; Glenn Rahman; Lynn Willis; Morgan Conrad; Alan K. Crandall; Gene Day; William Hamblin; Keith Herber; Chris Marrinan; John Sullivan; Tom Sullivan; Richard L. Tierney
- Publishers: Chaosium
- Publication: 1983; 42 years ago
- Genres: Horror
- Systems: Basic Role-Playing
- ISBN: 978-0933635067

Cthulhu Companion is a supplement published by Chaosium in 1983 for Call of Cthulhu .

== Contents ==
Cthulhu Companion is a supplement with information on prisons, insanity, Mythos creatures, and the Necronomicon, and also contains poetry from H.P. Lovecraft, and three short adventure scenarios.

== Publication history ==
Cthulhu Companion is a collection of essays written by Sandy Petersen, Glenn Rahman, Lynn Willis, Morgan Conrad, Alan K. Crandall, Gene Day, William Hamblin, Keith Herber, Chris Marrinan, John Sullivan, Tom Sullivan, and Richard L. Tierney, and edited by Sandy Petersen and Yurek Chodak. It was published by Chaosium in 1983 as a 64-page book, with cover art by Chris Marrinan, and interior art by Gene Day, Tom Sullivan, and Lisa A. Free. It was republished in 2022 as part of the Call of Cthulhu classic boxed set Kickstarter.

== Reception ==
Jon Sutherland reviewed Cthulhu Companion for White Dwarf #51, giving it an overall rating of 7 out of 10, and stated that "In conclusion, this tome is really of use only to the Keepers of Arcane Knowledge and given that this does not set out to fundamentally change any of the basic rules themselves, again this will limit appeal. The scenarios are quite good and altogether, this represents a predictable package and is reasonable value for money."

Graeme Davis reviewed Cthulhu Companion for Imagine magazine, and stated that "there is nothing which is not immediately useful to any campaign, and it is to be hoped that future supplements will maintain the very impressive standard of the Cthulhu Companion. The value for money is excellent, and no Call of Cthulhu referee can afford to be without it."

In the September–October 1984 edition of Different Worlds (Issue #36), Steve Marsh was slightly disappointed about this product, commenting that some of the material was very good, but some essays were of more questionable utility. He concluded, "Its only failure is that it is merely a good solid work instead of the brilliance I was expecting."

James Maliszewski for Black Gate in 2014 said "Whereas the original 1981 rulebook depicted Call of Cthulhu investigators as reporters and academics, the Companion gave the impression of their being more like Indiana Jones: bold explorers venturing into forgotten tombs in search of treasure and knowledge. Combined with the lengthy article by Richard L. Tierney (yes, that Richard L. Tierney) on 'The Cthulhu Mythos in Mesoamerican Religion' and you have the recipe for a very different take on Lovecraftian horror."
