= Rogue Mistress =

Role-playing game adventures

- Cover art by Alain Gassner
- Designers: Fred Behrendt, Lane Grate, Keith Herber, Michael Szymanski, Lawrence Whitaker
- Illustrators: Alain Gassner
- Publishers: Chaosium
- Publication: 1991

Rogue Mistress, subtitled "An Epic Campaign Across the Multiverse", is a collection of adventures published by Chaosium in 1991 for use with either of the fantasy role-playing games Stormbringer or Hawkmoon, both based on the Elric of Melniboné stories of Michael Moorcock.

== Description ==
Rogue Mistress is a campaign of nine chronologically-linked adventures in which the player characters travel to various planes that make up Michael Moorcock's "Million-Sphere Multiverse." Travel from sphere to sphere is accomplished on the pirate ship Rogue Mistress captained by Maria de tres Pistolas.

=== Adventures ===
The campaign consists of eight adventures that are played in sequence:

- "Dark Eyes, Cold Hearts": On the plane of Styyxx, the characters must find and deliver a prisoner to a demented witch, or die from the living demon hearts that have been implanted in them.
- "The Prisoner": On the plane of Ildaron, the characters must sneak into the palace of Queen Media in disguise.
- "The Rogue Mistress": The character board the sphere-travelling ship Rogue Mistress and are sent on a quest to find a piece of the Pirate of the Worlds.
- "Ghosts in the Machine": The missing piece is found in the wreck of another ship, but the characters must fight off "Energy Vampires".
- "The Web of Chaos": On the plane of Albyon, the characters search for an artifact, but are hurled through the spheres to The Sea of Whispers.
- "The Whispering Sea": Aided by the Eternal Champion, the characters must find and destroy the Scourge of Strashaa,
- "Dark of the Sun": On the high-tech plane of Uerth, the characters must choose between mutants and humans.
- "The Two Who Are One": The characters return to the plane of Styxxx in order to kill the demons whose hearts still beat within them.

== Publication history ==
In 1977, Chaosium acquired the game license for Michael Moorcock's Eternal Champion stories, and released the boardgame Elric: Battle at the End of Time. Under the same license in 1981, Chaosium published the fantasy role-playing game Stormbringer, and by 1990, had published the fourth edition. The following year, Chaosium published the campaign Rogue Mistress, a 144-page softcover book created by Fred Behrendt, Lane Grate, Keith Herber, Michael Szymanski, and Lawrence Whitaker, with cover art and interior art by Alain Gassner, and cartography by Carol Triplett-Smith.

In his 2014 book Designers & Dragons, game historian Shannon Appelcline noted that after the fourth edition of Stormbringer was published, "the best books to date for the line were produced first by Keith Herber, then by Mark Morrison. They consisted of thick, well-written books of background, such as Sorcerers of Pan Tang (1991) and colourful adventures, such as Rogue Mistress (1991)."

== Reception ==
In Issue 27 of White Wolf (June/July 1991), Matthew Gabbert noted that this campaign "dramatically captures the flavor and diversity of the Million Spheres." Gabbert was "extremely impressed" by this campaign, and thought it would be "sure to keep the adventurers on their toes. The plotting is suspenseful and imaginative." Gabbert did point out that "the pace tends to rush the characters along, with little chance to explore these brave new worlds." Gabbert concluded by giving this book a rating of 4 out of 5, saying, "While the price may seem a bit on the high side for an adventure, be assured that Rogue Mistress is 144 pages of long-lasting, high-quality roleplaying. The maps, NPC descriptions, and player handouts are first-rate; the layout is clear and concise; and the illustrations are excellent. So if you've got a party of tough guys who think they've seen all there is to see in the Young Kingdoms, book them a cruise on the coolest ship ever to sail the Seas of Fate."
