= 1920s Investigators' Companion =

Horror tabletop role-playing game supplement

A Core Gamebook for Players
- Cover of the updated 1997 edition
- Designers: Keith Herber
- Publishers: Chaosium
- Publication: 1993; 33 years ago
- Genres: Horror
- Systems: Basic Role-Playing
- ISBN: 1568821069

1920s Investigators' Companion is a role-playing game supplement for Call of Cthulhu by Keith Herber, published by Chaosium. Volume 1 was published in 1993, volume 2 in 1994. An updated single volume of The 1920s Investigator's Companion was published in 1997.

== Contents ==
Because modern game players may not know much about the early part of the twentieth century, 1920s Investigators' Companion contains information covering the 1920s. The book covers economic and social background, popular culture, research facilities, transportation, and equipment that would be available to 1920 investigators.

== Reception ==
In the October 1994 edition of Dragon (Issue 210), Rick Swan was impressed by the large volume of facts and figures, but questioned the book's usefulness, saying "Is the Companion interesting? Yep. Impressive? You bet. Useful? Well, you tell me — when was the last time you needed to know the horsepower of a Pierce-Arrow?" Swan concluded by giving the book an average rating of 3 out of 6, commenting, "This is mostly window dressing, helpful for spicing up a referee's descriptions, but unnecessary for players."

Wayne Ligon reviewed Investigators' Companion in White Wolf #49 (Nov., 1994), rating it a 4 out of 5 and stated that "This book is indespensible for the CoC investigator and Keeper. It offers a glimpse into the Roaring Twenties and provides very important rules on conducting research in a game that puts heavy emphasis on information gathering."

Reviewing the Polish edition of 1920s Investigators' Companion in Świat Gier Komputerowych in January 1999, Michał Nowakowski awarded the supplement 9.5/10. He praised its extensive and accessible coverage of everyday life in the 1920s, including social customs, popular culture, technology and equipment. He particularly appreciated the detailed descriptions of approximately 140 occupations, which he considered useful for developing believable investigator characters. His only significant criticism concerned the treatment of parapsychology, which he found too brief. He concluded that the book was an exceptionally valuable supplement for both players and game masters.

== Reviews ==
- The Unspeakable Oath #10 (Fall, 1993)
- Dragon #248 (June 1998)
- Backstab #7
- Backstab #11
- Magia i Miecz #51 (March 1998) (Polish)
- Envoyer #56
- Australian Realms #14
