= Jupiter (magazine) =

Science fiction magazine

First issue cover

Jupiter was a science fiction magazine edited by Ian Redman. The magazine was first published in July 2003. Based in the United Kingdom, Jupiter garnered a solid reputation as a dependable small press in its respective field, as noted by SF Crowsnest, and was a publication which SFRevue called "an amusing journey". Jupiter, published four times a year, was produced in a minimalist style (i.e. monochrome cover, no interior illustrations, brief editorial, no non-fiction and stapled in the middle). Each issue was named after one of the Jovian satellites, with the traditional number of the moon matching the issue number of the magazine. The final issue was issue L: "Herse", dated October 2015 but published March 2016

While the strength of each issue wavered—and although there was no pay—Jupiter attracted rising stars in the field of speculative fiction, such as the Clarke-Bradbury award winner Lavie Tidhar, Davin Ireland, Eric S. Brown, David Conyers, Peter Tennant, Andrew Hook and Anubis nominee Carmelo Rafala.
