= Keith Herber =

American author, editor, and musician

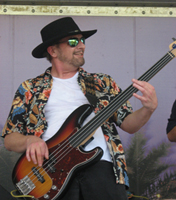
- Born: January 3, 1949; Detroit, Michigan, United States
- Died: March 13, 2009 (aged 60); Lakeland, Florida, United States
- Occupations: Writer, editor, musician
- Writing career
- Period: mid 1980s-2009
- Genre: Horror
- Website: Miskatonic River Press

Keith Donald "Doc" Herber (January 3, 1949 – March 13, 2009) was an American author, editor, and musician.

== Career ==
Keith Herber was born in Detroit, Michigan, United States. He began working on the fourth edition of Chaosium's Call of Cthulhu role-playing game in 1989; he was the line editor for the game for the next five years, including the change to the fifth edition of Call of Cthulhu in 1992, until he left Chaosium in 1994. While there he wrote and edited such award-winning books as The Fungi from Yuggoth, Trail of Tsathogghua, Spawn of Azathoth, Arkham Unveiled, Return to Dunwich, Investigator’s Companion Volumes 1 & 2, and the Keeper’s Compendium. The anthology Cthulhu's Dark Cults was dedicated to his memory.

Herber wrote for Pagan Publishing's The Unspeakable Oath magazine. Following his time at Chaosium, Herber wrote two novels for White Wolf's Vampire game as well as the Tremere Clanbook. He also served as an editor for Cinescape Magazine.

Herber's venture at the time of his death was Miskatonic River Press, a publishing company started in 2009 to produce a number of supplements for Call of Cthulhu, as well as several fiction anthologies.

Throughout his time as an author and editor, Herber played bass guitar for blues and rock bands across the United States, including Detroit's Progressive Blues Band, Dr. John, Bonnie Raitt, Mitch Ryder, The Fabulous Thunderbirds and opening for The Temptations, John Mayall, The Violent Femmes, and others.

Herber died in Lakeland, Florida in March 2009, aged 60.

== Roleplaying game credits ==
Book	Publisher	Year
New Tales of the Miskatonic Valley (Call of Cthulhu)	Miskatonic River Press	2008
H. P. Lovecraft's Arkham (Call of Cthulhu)	Chaosium	2003
H. P. Lovecraft's Dunwich (Call of Cthulhu)	Chaosium	2002
Keeper's Companion, Volume 1 (Call of Cthulhu)	Chaosium	2000
Call of Cthulhu, ver. 5.5	Chaosium	1998
Creature Companion (Call of Cthulhu)	Chaosium	1998
Escape From Innsmouth, 2nd Ed. (Call of Cthulhu)	Chaosium	1997
The Compact Arkham Unveiled, The (Call of Cthulhu)	Chaosium	1995
Immortal Eyes: The Toybox (Changeling: The Dreaming)	White Wolf	1995
1920s Investigator's Companion, Vol. 2 (Call of Cthulhu)	Chaosium	1994
Clanbook: Tremere (Vampire: The Masquerade)	White Wolf	1994
Call of Cthulhu, 5th Ed.	Chaosium	1992
Cthulhu Now, 2nd Ed.	Chaosium	1992
Rogue Mistress (Stormbringer)	Chaosium	1991
Blood Brothers (Call of Cthulhu)	Chaosium	1990
Mansions of Madness (Call of Cthulhu)	Chaosium	1990
H.P. Lovecraft's Dreamlands (Call of Cthulhu)	Chaosium	1988
Spawn of Azathoth (Call of Cthulhu)	Chaosium	1986
Trail of Tsathogghua (Call of Cthulhu)	Chaosium	1984
The Fungi from Yuggoth (Call of Cthulhu)	Chaosium	1984
Cthulhu Companion (Call of Cthulhu)	Chaosium	1983

== Fiction credits ==
Book	Publisher	Year
Prince of the City (Vampire: The Masquerade)	White Wolf	1995
Dark Prince (Vampire: The Masquerade)	HarperPrism	1994
