= The Spiraling Worm =

2007 novel by David Conyers and John Sunseri

- Author: David Conyers and John Sunseri
- Cover artist: David Lee Ingersoll
- Language: English
- Series: Jack Dixon/Harrison Peel
- Genre: Science fiction, Horror
- Publisher: Chaosium
- Publication date: July 12, 2007
- Publication place: United States
- Media type: Print (Hardcover & Paperback)
- Pages: 320
- ISBN: 1-56882-212-X
- OCLC: 154699054

The Spiraling Worm is a science fiction and Lovecraftian horror novel written in the style of a spy thriller, by authors David Conyers and John Sunseri. Published in 2007, the novel went received an Honourable Mention for Best Australian Horror Novel in the 12th Annual Aurealis Award (2007) and the Australian Shadows Award (2007). The last three stories received honorable mentions in the Year's Best Fantasy and Horror Volume 21.

== Plot introduction ==
The Spiraling Worm consists of seven interconnected tales. Each story features spies and government agents battling terrorists and government conspiracies who wish to release cosmic horrors of the Cthulhu Mythos from their hidden dimensions to destroy the Earth. The seven stories are:

- "Made of Meat" by David Conyers
- "To What Green Altar" by John Sunseri
- "Impossible Object" by David Conyers
- "False Containment" by David Conyers
- "Resurgence" by John Sunseri
- "Weapon Grade" by David Conyers
- "The Spiraling Worm" by David Conyers and John Sunseri

== Plot summary ==
The book is introduced by C. J. Henderson with an After Word by the authors. The plot summaries of the seven stories are:

- "Made of Meat": In the Cambodian jungles, Major Harrison Peel of the Australian Army Intelligence Corps and MI6 spy James Figgs, are involved in covert operations fighting a losing war against Tcho-Tcho terrorists. The Tcho-Tcho are able to predict Peel's and Figgs’ every move, efficiently eliminating the foreigner's agents under their very noses. Peel seeks the aid of a Vietnam War veteran who provides him with the intelligence he requires to bring the Tcho-Tchos’ reign to an end.
- "To What Green Altar": In Siberia, Middle Eastern cultists slaughter every single employee at a remote Russian mine. In London, James Figgs calls NSA agent Jack Dixon to aid in the investigation of this attack, and together they uncover its connection to the 1908 Tunguska event. A trail leads to the Vatican City, where the summoning of a Cthulhu Mythos deity almost forces a global religious war between Muslims and Christians.
- "Impossible Object": The ancient city of Pnakotus in Australia's Great Sandy Desert, a city that was once home to the Great Race of Yith, has been unearthed by the Australian government. Their secret investigation of its ruins found nothing of value except for a strange artifact, the Impossible Object, which no one can describe or classify. Harrison Peel, now head of security at the city, tries to understand its purpose before more scientific researchers die, or are erased from existence altogether by the Object's unpredictable properties.
- "False Containment": Harrison Peel travels from Australia to Thailand, to Los Angeles and then into the deserts of Nevada, spurred on by a strange encounter with himself from the future with disturbing news of a wormhole leading to a monstrous god called the Many-Thing that devours worlds. Toxic and nuclear waste is materializing all over the world, and Peel becomes convinced its source is a new waste treatment plant in Nevada, utilizing technology of great interest to the Pentagon, and derived from knowledge offered by the Impossible Object.
- "Resurgence": Shoggoths from Antarctica are waking. Discovering that there is nothing to feed their hunger in the icy wastelands, and freed from their incarceration as slaves to the ancient alien race of the Elder Things, they advance northwards. In Argentina, Jack Dixon's expertise is called upon to defeat a bold shoggoth, which he destroys with a nuclear weapon. Facing a similar foe in Australia, Harrison Peel is not able to deploy weapons of mass destruction because no one in the Australian or United States government will provide him with one, fearful of the political ramifications if a nuclear bomb is detonated on Australian soil.
- "Weapon Grade": After suffering severe radiation poisoning from his encounter with a shoggoth in Sydney, Peel is dying. He hopes to go quietly, but Dixon calls upon Peel's expertise, taking him to Utah, Antarctica and finally another universe, to secret US bases where Dixon's government has long been studying the properties of shoggoths. Meanwhile, a rogue Israeli Mossad spy plans to steal a tissue sample of a shoggoth, only to be defeated by Peel as they pass between dimensions. The effects of higher-dimensional time flow, cures Peel of his radiation poisoning.
- "The Spiraling Worm": In the jungle of the Eastern Congo Basin the cult of the Spiraling Worm is building an army, whose primary goal is to restore the powers of the Outer Gods. A team of British and American Special Forces, led by Peel, Dixon and Figgs, are sent into Africa to stop the army.

== See also ==
The following novels and short stories follow similar themes of espionage agents working against supernatural or alien entities.

- The Atrocity Archives, The Jennifer Morgue and A Colder War by Charles Stross
- Declare by Tim Powers
- Delta Green role-playing game
