= The Terror from the Depths =

1976 short story by Fritz Leiber

- Author: Fritz Leiber
- Language: English
- Genre: Horror, Cthulhu Mythos
- Published: 1976
- Publication place: United States
- The story was begun in 1937 but not finished until 1975.

"The Terror from the Depths" is a short story by American writer Fritz Leiber. It is part of the Cthulhu Mythos genre of horror fiction. It was begun in 1937 but not finished until 1975. It was first published in the anthology The Disciples of Cthulhu in 1976.

== Summary ==
The story begins with a note that this manuscript was found inside a container, which was sold at an auction. The story's narrator is George Reuter Fischer, who was born on April 30, 1912, in Louisville, Kentucky. Fischer's father is a mason and stonecutter, who moves his family to Vulture's Roost, California near Hollywood. There, his father builds a mansion with strange stonecarvings. George, however, is troubled by strange dreams where he's in a tunnel as a blind worm-like being. In one of his nightmares, George realizes he's one of the monsters and, in another dream, he sees himself being eaten by those monsters. George eventually finds a way to prevent these dreams. During a hike with his son one afternoon, Fischer's father is killed after he suddenly falls off a cliff. Years later, when Fischer is attending Miskatonic University, he's forced to leave the college soon after due to a combination of factors including nervousness, homesickness, actual ailment, increased hours of sleep, and sleepwalking.
