= Spawn of Azathoth =

Call of Cthulhu adventure

Herald of the End of Time
- 1st edition, art by Susan Seddon Boulet, 1986
- Designers: Keith Herber
- Publishers: Chaosium
- Publication: 1986 1st edition; 2005 2nd edition
- Genres: Horror
- Systems: Basic Role-Playing
- ISBN: 9780933635296

Spawn of Azathoth, subtitled Herald of the End of Time, is a supplement published by Chaosium in 1986 for the horror role-playing game Call of Cthulhu. A second edition was published in 2005.

== Description ==
Spawn of Azathoth is a Call of Cthulhu campaign set in the 1920s that is divided into an introductory scene and seven adventures:

- Introduction: "A Ghostly Presence"
1. Providence, Rhode Island
2. Garrison, Montana
3. St. Augustine, Florida
4. The Andaman Islands
5. Ulthar and Beyond
6. The Eternal Quest
7. The Tibetan Interior

With the exception of the first and last chapters, the interior chapters can be played in any order, depending on the clues the Investigators choose to follow.

== Plot summary ==
The day after a ghostly apparition awakens one of the Investigators, the same Investigator learns of the untimely death of a mentor, Philip Baxter of Providence, Rhode Island. After the Investigators attend Baxter's funeral and read some of his papers, they start to suspect that Baxter did not die from natural causes. As they trace Baxter's life in Providence, the Investigators uncover a number of leads; the order in which they follow these leads will determine the order in which they encounter the subsequent adventures in the campaign. As the adventures unfold, the Investigators will learn of a plot to destroy a guardian who has protected the Earth from incursions by "seeds" from the Elder God Azathoth. The investigators then must race against time to undo the plot and save humanity.

== Publication history ==
2nd edition, art by Tom Sullivan, 2005

The first edition of Spawn of Azathoth, written for the third edition of Call of Cthulhu by Keith Herber, with contributions by Sandy Petersen and Lynn Willis, a cover by Susan Seddon Boulet and illustrations by Kevin Ramos, was published in 1986 as a boxed set consisting of three books:

- Part 1: From Beyond The Grave (32-page book that includes the introduction and first chapter of the campaign)
- Part 2, The Spawn Approaches (64-page book that includes the rest of the campaign)
- The Azathoth Papers (32-page book of player handouts)

The second edition, published in 2005 for the 6th edition rules of Call of Cthulhu, is a 200-page softcover book with the original text and handouts supplemented by contributions from David Conyers, Don Coatar, Jeff Carey, and Steve Hatherley, additional illustrations by Mislet Michel, Andy Hopp, and Paul Carrick, and new cover art by Tom Sullivan.

== Reception ==
In the November 1986 edition of White Dwarf (Issue #83), Peter Green thought the campaign "gets off to a nicely horrific start" and followed up with "enough horror here to send even the most hardened Investigator insane, and lots of good detective work is called for to piece the story together." However Green thought that compared to the well-received adventure Masks of Nyarlathotep, this boxed set contained much less material, and that "some useful pieces of information seem to have been overlooked." He concluded, "I came away feeling that although it had some nice ideas in there, it had not been developed as much as could have been. While the overall plot is good and most of its component adventures are interesting, it lacks the vital 'Oommph' which would have made it a classic adventure..."
