= Robert Weinberg (author) =

American writer (1946–2016)

- Born: Robert Edward Weinberg; August 29, 1946; Newark, New Jersey, U.S.
- Died: September 25, 2016 (aged 70); Oak Forest, Illinois, U.S.
- Occupations: Writer; editor; publisher; book and art dealer
- Writing career
- Genres: Science fiction Horror; Superhero fiction Western
- Website: robertweinberg.net

Robert Edward Weinberg (August 29, 1946 – September 25, 2016) was an American author, editor, publisher, and collector of science fiction. His work spans several genres including non-fiction, science fiction, horror, and comic books.

== Biography ==
Born in New Jersey in 1946, Weinberg sold his first story in 1967. Most of his writing career was conducted part-time while also owning a bookstore; he became a full-time writer after 1997.

Weinberg was also an editor, and edited books in the fields of horror, science fiction and western.

Weinberg graduated from Stevens Institute of Technology.

From 1970 to 1981, Weinberg edited and published Pulp, a fanzine devoted to pulp magazines; Pulp became noted for its interviews with pulp writers such as Walter B. Gibson and Frederick C. Davis. Pulp ran for 14 issues. He also published the Pulp Classics, Lost Fantasy, Weird Menace, and Incredible Adventures series of pulp reprints at the same time.

In comics, Weinberg wrote for Marvel Comics; his first job was on the series Cable, and he later created the series Nightside starring Sydney Taine a character who had previously appeared in a short story Weinberg wrote.

Weinberg sat on the 'Council of Six', a board of editorial advisers for Canadian publisher Battered Silicon Dispatch Box. Along with another board member, George Vanderburgh, Weinberg took the editorial reins at Arkham House.

In 2007 he was presented a Bram Stoker Award for Lifetime Achievement. At Chicon 7, Weinberg received a Special Committee Award for his service to science fiction, fantasy, and horror. Due to health issues, Weinberg was unable to attend and the award was accepted on his behalf by Jane Frank. He died in Oak Forest, Illinois, on September 25, 2016, at the age of 70.

== Bibliography ==
=== Anthologies edited ===
- Far Below and Other Horrors (1974)
- Revelry in Hell: Pulp Classics #3 (1974)
- Doctor Satan: Pulp Classics #6 (1974)
- Devils in the Dark (1979)
- 100 Tiny Terror Tales (1984) (with Stefan R. Dziemianowicz, Martin H. Greenberg)
- The Eighth Green Man and Other Strange Folk (1987)
- Weird Tales: 32 Unearthed Horrors (1988) (with Stefan R Dziemianowicz, Martin H. Greenberg)
- Mists From Beyond: 22 Ghost Stories and Tales from the Other Side (1989) (with Stefan R. Dziemianowicz, Martin H. Greenberg)
- 100 Fiendish Little Frightmares (1990) (with Stefan R. Dziemianowicz, Martin H. Greenberg)
- Lovecraft's Legacy (1990) (with Martin H. Greenberg) Introduction by Robert Bloch
- Between Time and Terror (1990) (with Stefan R. Dziemianowicz, Martin H. Greenberg)
- Rivals of Weird Tales (1990) (with Stefan R. Dziemianowicz, Martin H. Greenberg)
- A Taste for Blood (1991) (with Stefan R. Dziemianowicz, Martin H. Greenberg)
- Famous Fantastic Mysteries (1991) (with Stefan R. Dziemianowicz, Martin H. Greenberg)
- Hard-Boiled Detectives: 23 Great Stories from Dime Detective Magazine (1992) (with Stefan R. Dziemianowicz)
- 100 Ghastly Little Ghost Stories (1992) (with Stefan R. Dziemianowicz, Martin H. Greenberg)
- Weird Vampire Tales (1992) (with Stefan R. Dziemianowicz, Martin H. Greenberg)
- To Sleep, Perchance to Dream...Nightmare (1993) (with Stefan R. Dziemianowicz, Martin H. Greenberg)
- 100 Dastardly Little Detective Stories (1993) (with Stefan R. Dziemianowicz, Martin H. Greenberg)
- Nursery Crimes (1993) (with Stefan R. Dziemianowicz, Martin H. Greenberg)
- Tough Guys and Dangerous Dames (1993)
- 100 Wild Little Weird Tales (1994) (with Stefan R. Dziemianowicz, Martin H. Greenberg)
- 100 Crooked Little Crime Stories (1994) (with Stefan R. Dziemianowicz, Martin H. Greenberg)
- 100 Creepy Little Creature Stories (1994) (with Stefan R. Dziemianowicz, Martin H. Greenberg)
- 100 Vicious Little Vampire Stories (1995) (with Stefan R. Dziemianowicz, Martin H. Greenberg)
- 100 Wicked Little Witch Stories (1995) (with Stefan R. Dziemianowicz, Martin H. Greenberg)
- Great Writers and Kids Write Spooky Stories (1995) (with Martin H. Greenberg, Jill M. Morgan)
- 100 Astounding Little Alien Stories (1996) (with Stefan R. Dziemianowicz, Martin H. Greenberg)
- Miskatonic University (1996) (with Martin H. Greenberg)
- 100 Tiny Tales of Terror (1996) (with Stefan R. Dziemianowicz, Martin H. Greenberg)
- Rivals of Dracula (1996) (with Stefan R. Dziemianowicz, Martin H. Greenberg)
- Virtuous Vampires (1996) (with Stefan R. Dziemianowicz, Martin H. Greenberg)
- Girls' Night Out: 29 Female Vampire Stories (1997) (with Stefan R. Dziemianowicz, Martin H. Greenberg)
- Mistresses of the Dark: 25 Macabre Tales by Master Storytellers (1998) (with Stefan R. Dziemianowicz, Denise Little)
- 100 Twisted Little Tales of Torment (1998) (with Stefan R. Dziemianowicz, Martin H. Greenberg)
- 100 Hilarious Little Howlers (1999) (with Stefan R. Dziemianowicz, Martin H. Greenberg)
- Dial Your Dreams: And Other Nightmares (2001)
- The Termination Node, Random House/Del Rey, science fiction novel, adult, 1999 hc/pb, co-author Lois H. Gresh
- The Computers of Star Trek, Basic Books, science, adult, 2000 hc/trade, co-author Lois H. Gresh
- The Science of Superheroes, John Wiley & Sons, science, adult, 2002 hc/trade, co-author Lois H. Gresh
- The Science of Supervillains, John Wiley & Sons, science, adult, 2004 hc/trade, co-author Lois H. Gresh
- The Science of James Bond, John Wiley & Sons, science, adult, 2006 trade, co-author Lois H. Gresh
- The Science of Anime, science, adult, 2005 trade, co-author Lois H. Gresh
- The Science of Stephen King, John Wiley & Sons, science, adult, 2007 hc, co-author Lois H. Gresh
- The Many Mysteries of Indiana Jones, John Wiley & Sons, science, adult (2008), trade, co-author Lois H. Gresh

=== Books written ===
- The Weinberg-McKinstry Hero Pulp Index (1971) (with Lohr McKinstry) Caz Publications
- The Weird Tales Story (1977) FAX Collector's Editions
- The Devil's Auction (1988) Owlswick Press
- The Armageddon Box (1991) Wildside Press
- The Black Lodge (1991) Wildside Press
- The Dead Man's Kiss (1992) - Pocket Books
- A Logical Magician (1994) Ace Books
- Masquerade of the Red Death Trilogy (1995) White Wolf Publishing
- The Horizon War Trilogy (1996) White Wolf Publishing
- A Calculated Magic (1996) Ace Books
- CONTRIBUTIONS TO:
- The Alluring Art of Margaret Brundage - Queen of Pulp Pin-Up Art (2013) Stephen D. Korshak and J. David Spurlock, Vanguard Production in association with Shasta-Phoenix Publishers; Memories of Margaret by Robert Weinberg; ISBN 1-934331-50-3

=== Comics ===
Comics work includes:

- Cable #79-96 (with art by Michael Ryan, Marvel Comics, 2000–2001)
- Nightside #1-4 (with art by Tom Derenick, Marvel Comics, 2002)
- Vampire the Masquerade: Giovanni #1 (with art by Richard Clark, Moonstone Books, 2003)
- Extinction Event #1-5 (with art by Brett Booth, WildStorm, 2003–2004)
- The Phantom: Generations #13 (with art by Andy Bennett, Moonstone Books, 2010)
- HP Lovecraft: The Dunwitch Horror #1-4 ('The Hound' feature only with art by Menton3, IDW Publishing, 2011–2012)
