= H. P. Lovecraft's Arkham =

Role-playing game supplement

H. P. Lovecraft's Arkham is a 2003 role-playing game supplement published by Chaosium for Call of Cthulhu.

== Contents ==
H. P. Lovecraft's Arkham is a supplement in which a detailed guide to Lovecraft's town of Arkham equips investigators with lore, locations, maps, and adventures for exploring the mysteries of the Cthulhu Mythos.

== Reviews ==
- Envoyer
- Rebel Times #12
