= Martha Stone Hubbell =

American author

Martha Stone Hubbell (1814 – August 1856) was an American writer.

== Biography ==
She was born in Oxford, Connecticut, in 1814; died in North Stonington, Connecticut, in 1856. She was the daughter of Dr. Noah Stone, and married Reverend Stephen Hubbell (1802–1884) in 1832. She wrote children's stories for the American and Massachusetts Sunday school Union, and The Shady Side, or Life in a Country Parsonage, by a Pastor's Wife (Boston, 1853). This was intended as a counterpart to The Sunny Side by Elizabeth Stuart Phelps (1815–1852) and 40.000 copies were sold in a year.
