= The Fungi from Yuggoth =

Call of Cthulhu adventure

Desperate Adventures Against the Brotherhood
- Cover art by Chris Marrinan, 1984
- Designers: Keith Herber
- Publishers: Chaosium
- Publication: 1984 1st edition; 1987 2nd edition
- Genres: Horror
- Systems: Basic Role-Playing
- ISBN: 0-933635-08-7

The Fungi from Yuggoth is a set of eight adventures published by Chaosium in 1984 for the horror role-playing game Call of Cthulhu, itself based on the works of H.P. Lovecraft.

== Description ==
The Fungi from Yuggoth is a campaign of eight sequentially linked adventures set in the 1920s that uses what reviewer Richard Lee typified as the "onion-skin" plot device: The campaign starts with what seems to be a trivial event, but each adventure peels layer after layer, gradually revealing deeper and darker mysteries involving an apocalyptic cult called The Brotherhood of the Beast, until the overall plot is finally exposed in the last chapter. The book is divided into eight chapters, each one a separate scenario:

1. The Dreamer: The investigators are hired to find a missing medium in New York City.
2. The Thing in the Well: The investigators look into a series of child murders in Boston.
3. Castle Dark: The investigators travel to Transylvania.
4. Sands of Time: In Egypt, the investigators find a Miskatonic University team has been looking for the tomb of Nophru-Ka, a long-dead Egyptian priest.
5. Mountains of the Moon: The investigators travel to a mining operation in Peru that is providing material for the Brotherhood.
6. By the Bay: Part I: The investigators encounter a Chinese cult in San Francisco.
7. By the Bay: Part II: Also set in San Francisco, at a research station.
8. Day of the Beast: The finale in Egypt and the Gaza Plateau.

== Publication history ==
Chaosium first published the horror role-playing game Call of Cthulhu in 1981, and supported it with a large number of adventures and campaigns. The Fungi from Yuggoth, published in 1984 as an 80-page saddle-stapled softcover book, was written by Keith Herber, with art by Chris Marrinan. Chaosium released a second printing in 1987.

The adventure was later included as one of the adventures in Curse of Cthulhu.

== Reception ==
In Issue 6 of Fantasy Gamer, William A. Barton called The Fungi from Yuggoth "probably the best CoC adventure yet released of several excellent offerings."

In Issue 30 of Abyss (Summer 1984), Dave Nalle thought "the organization and presentation is excellent, and the art is rather nice as well." Of the adventures, Nalle noted, "While most of the material is not exactly inspirational, it is all solid and playable, though sometimes a bit derivative of old movies and familiar stories." Nalle concluded, "It isn't exciting or all that new, but The Fungi from Yuggoth will provide a good bit of varied play in a style which is familiar but well done enough not to be boring."

In Issue 21 of the British RPG magazine Imagine, Richard Lee reviewed several Call of Cthulhu adventures including Curse of the Chthonians and The Fungi from Yuggoth. Lee found writer Keither Herber had used "impeccable technique" and "conviction" in creating The Fungi from Yuggoth, commenting that the eight chapters "contrive to make Lovecraft's horrific worlds rather too close for comfort." He concluded "Curse and Fungi are worthy supplements indeed: well-detailed and original. With Call of Cthulhu so capably documented and now so reasonably priced, the world of Twenties style and pulp-fiction atmosphere must loom as a considerable threat to the more conventional RPGs."

In Issue 39 of Different Worlds, Ed Wimble commented "Overall, I'd say that The Fungi is a better buy than either of its predecessors. In spite of its flaws (and they are really not too serious or prevalent) the real bread and butter issue is how the adventure plays. This is where The Fungi from Yuggoth excels. The three to five nights you spend in company with this book will be some of the best (albeit, at times with tongue in cheek) you've had in gaming."
