= Brian McNaughton =

American novelist

- Born: 23 September 1935; Red Bank, New Jersey
- Died: 13 May 2004 (aged 68)
- Occupation: Writer
- Writing career
- Language: English

Brian McNaughton (23 September 1935 – 13 May 2004) was an American writer of horror and fantasy fiction who mixed sex, satire and black humour. He also wrote thrillers.

== Biography ==
Born at Red Bank, New Jersey, McNaughton attended Harvard and worked for ten years as a reporter for the Newark Evening News. He later held a variety of other jobs, meanwhile publishing about two hundred short stories in magazines and several books.

Several of his novels were first published by Carlyle Books under editorially imposed titles implying that they were part of a series. Although Worse Things Waiting follows on from Downward to Darkness, the other books featured completely unrelated characters and situations. Restored texts of these books have been published by Wildside Press under their original titles.

His work includes literary nods to writers such as H. P. Lovecraft, Robert E. Howard, Clark Ashton Smith and Bram Stoker. His story "The Return of the Colossus" is a sequel to Smith's "The Colossus of Ylourgne" set during World War I; while the title of "To My Dear Friend Hommy-Beg" echoes Stoker's dedication for Dracula.

The Throne of Bones, a collection of horror-fantasy stories about ghouls set in an opulent, decadent world reminiscent of Clark Ashton Smith, won the World Fantasy Award for best collection and was nominated for the Bram Stoker Award for Best Fiction Collection.

== Bibliography ==
=== Novels ===
- In Flagrant Delight (1972)
- Gemini Rising (1977; editorially altered version published as Satan's Love Child; restored text 2000)
- Buster Callan (1978)
- Downward to Darkness (1978; editorially altered version published as Satan's Mistress; restored text 2000)
- Guilty Until Proven Guilty (1979)
- Worse Things Waiting (1979; editorially altered version published as Satan's Seductress; restored text 2000)
- The House Across the Way (1982; editorially altered version published as Satan's Surrogate; restored text 2001)

=== Short story collections ===
- The Throne of Bones (1997)
- Nasty Stories (2000)
- Even More Nasty Stories (2000)
