= Elder Signs Press =

American book publisher

- Founded: 2003
- Country of origin: United States
- Headquarters location: Lake Orion, Michigan
- Distribution: Independent Publishers Group
- Publication types: Books
- Fiction genres: Horror, science fiction, and fantasy
- Imprints: Dimension Books
- Official website: www.eldersignspress.com

Elder Signs Press, Inc (a.k.a. ESP) is a Michigan-based book publisher distributed through the Independent Publishers Group. It specializes in horror, science fiction, and fantasy titles.

== History ==
ESP was founded in 2003 by William Jones, a gamer and Lovecraftian horror enthusiast. Its initial publications were issues of the Call of Cthulhu fanzine Book of Dark Wisdom. The magazine's format was changed with the third issue to focus on horror fiction and poetry. Eleven issues were published before the magazine was converted to an annual book anthology in 2009.

As a book publisher, ESP is primarily a self-publishing venture for Jones, who has written several novels and edited numerous anthologies released under the imprint. However, the company does publish books and anthologies from other authors and editors. Its first book was Stanley C. Sargent’s Ancient Exhumations +2, a collection of Lovecraftian short fiction published in 2004. The company is best known as a publisher of Cthulhu Mythos material, but it has also published work in genres such as cyberpunk and apocalyptic survival horror. Editors involved with the company included Deborah Robbins and Charles P. Zaglanis.

The publishing company went on indefinite hiatus in 2018.

== Books ==
Books published by Elder Signs Press were trade paperbacks available via Ingram Books, Baker & Taylor, Alliance Game Distributors, Diamond Comics. They were distributed by the Independent Publishers Group (IPG) and, at the height of the company's activity, had titles carried by major booksellers such as Borders Books and Barnes & Noble.

Between 2004 and 2018, ESP published the following books.

- Ancient Exhumations +2 by Stanley C. Sargent, August 2004
- Terrors by Richard A. Lupoff, November 2005
- Chronicles of the Apocalypse: Species by Michael McBride, January 2006
- White Tribe by Gene O'Neill, May 2006
- Twice Dead Things by A.A. Attanasio, Trade Paperback, November 2006
- Rehearsals for Oblivion: Tales of the King in Yellow edited by Peter A. Worthy, September 2006
- The Things That Are Not There by C.J. Henderson, October 2006
- Saint-Germain: Memoirs by Chelsea Quinn Yarbro, October 2007 (also appeared in limited ed. hardcover)
- The Stench of Fresh Air by C.J. Henderson, June 2008
- The Cthulhu Mythos Encyclopedia by Daniel Harms, August 2008
- Looking for Darla: Stories of Mythos Noir by Ron Shiflet, September 2008
- Black Glass by John Shirley, November 2008
- The Sleep That Rescues by C.J. Henderson, October 2009
- The Anthology of Dark Wisdom edited by William Jones, October 2009
- The Best of All Flesh edited by James Lowder, January 2010
- What to Do When You Meet Cthulhu: A Guide to Surviving the Cthulhu Mythos by Rachel Gray and William Jones, November 2010
- Blood and Ice by Lois H. Gresh, January 2011
- The Ravening by Stewart Sternberg, January 2011
- Scavengers by Christopher Fulbright & Angeline Hawkes, October 2011
- Street Magick: Tales of Urban Fantasy edited by Charles P. Zaglanis, November 2016
- Dark Horizons: An Anthology of Dark Science Fiction edited by Charles P. Zaglanis, November 2016
- A Summer with the Dead by Sherry Decker, May 2017
- Tombs by James Dorr, June 2017
- Inferno: Tales of Hell and Horror by Angeline Hawkes, October 2017
- The Vampire Years by Eric Del Carlo, December 2017

== Magazines ==
ESP published the following issues of The Book of Dark Wisdom, a magazine that started as a Call of Cthulhu fanzine, but later evolved into a more mature publication with original articles, poetry, fiction, and features by notable and upcoming authors in the horror and RPG genre.

- The Book of Dark Wisdom #1, 2003
- The Book of Dark Wisdom #2, 2003
- The Book of Dark Wisdom #3, 2004
- The Book of Dark Wisdom #4, 2004
- The Book of Dark Wisdom #5, 2005
- The Book of Dark Wisdom #6, 2005
- The Book of Dark Wisdom #7, 2005
- The Book of Dark Wisdom #8, 2006
- The Book of Dark Wisdom #9, 2006
- The Book of Dark Wisdom #10, 2007
- The Book of Dark Wisdom #11, 2007

== Authors ==
Authors that were published by Elder Signs Press include:

- James Ambuehl
- Eric Del Carlo
- Tim Curran
- Sherry Decker
- James Dorr
- Christopher Fulbright
- Rachel Gray
- Lois H. Gresh
- Daniel Harms
- Angeline Hawkes
- CJ Henderson
- William Jones
- James Lowder
- Michael McBride
- Richard A. Lupoff
- Gene O'Neil
- Stanley C. Sargent
- John Shirley
- Stewart Sternberg
- Chelsea Quinn Yarbro
