= Molly Tanzer =

American writer (born 1981)

- Born: October 29, 1981 (age 44); Marietta, Georgia, U.S.
- Education: Rollins College (BA); Florida State University (MA)
- Occupations: Novelist; social worker; barista
- Writing career
- Genres: Horror; fantasy; science fiction; erotica; Lovecraftian horror
- Literary movement: Bizarro fiction; New weird
- Website: mollytanzer.com

Molly Tanzer (born October 29, 1981) is an American fantasy, horror, and science fiction writer. She won the Colorado Book Award for historical fiction, and has been nominated for the Locus Award, British Fantasy Award, and the Wonderland Book Award. She is known for genre-bending fiction that combines horror and fantasy with strong female protagonists, depth of characterization, and realistic interpersonal relationships.

== Early life and education ==
Tanzer was born in Marietta, Georgia. She moved to West Palm Beach, Florida, when she was 12. She studied Art History at Rollins College, and received a Master's in Humanities from Florida State University, with a focus on 18th-century novels written by women about the transatlantic slave trade.

== Style and themes ==
Tanzer's books often combine elements of multiple genres including horror, fantasy, science fiction, realism, and comedy. She frequently sets her books in alternate historical settings, in which she incorporates people of color, LGBTQIA characters, and strong female protagonists. Tanzer has stated that she strives for inclusivity in her works and that she is especially interested in the "queering of history." Tanzer has been noted for the strong characterizations in her novels, complex relationships, as well as sharp and witty dialogue. Women's relationships are a prominent part of Tanzer's novels, which frequently include more than one female protagonist. Her novels often have "slow-burn" pacing with a longer build up that eventually gives way to action.

== Awards ==
=== Won ===
- Colorado Book Award, Historical Fiction 2020 (Creatures of Charm and Hunger)

=== Nominated ===
- Locus Award, Best Fantasy Novel 2018 (Creatures of Want and Ruin)
- British Fantasy Award, Sydney J. Bounds Best Newcomer 2013 (A Pretty Mouth)
- Wonderland Book Award, Best Collection 2013 (A Pretty Mouth)

=== Best Book Lists ===
- NPR Best Books of 2015 (Vermilion)
- io9 Best Science Fiction and Fantasy Books of 2015 (Vermilion)

== Published works ==
=== Novels ===
- Vermilion (2015)
- The Pleasure Merchant (2015)

==== Diabolist's Library Trilogy ====
- Creatures of Charm and Hunger (2020)
- Creatures of Want and Ruin (2018)
- Creatures of Will and Temper (2017)

=== Novellas ===
- And Side by Side They Wander (Tordotcom, 2026)

=== Collections ===
- Rumbullion and Other Liminal Libations (2013)
- A Pretty Mouth (2012)

=== Edited anthologies ===
- Mixed Up: Cocktail Recipes (and Flash Fiction) for the Discerning Drinker (and Reader) (2017)
- Swords v. Cthulhu (2016)

=== Manga adaptation ===
- The Drifting Classroom, perfect edition, vol. 1–3, by Kazuo Umezu (2019)

=== Short stories ===
- "Les Chimeres: an Ode", Magazine of Fantasy & Science Fiction (Sep/Oct 2022)
- "In the Garden of Ibn Ghazi", Magazine of Fantasy & Science Fiction (Mar/Apr 2021),
- "The Deductive Method: A Miskatonic University Story", Chaosium.com
- "A Judgment Made Can Never Bend", Forbidden Futures #4
- "The Real You™", Lightspeed Magazine #101
- "Le Cygne Baiseur", Mechanical Animals
- "The Language of Flowers", Dark Discoveries #37
- "Nine Tenths of the Law", Lightspeed
- "Cognac, Communism, and Cocaine", with Nick Mamatas, Through A Mythos Darkly
- "That Nature Which Peers Out In Sleep", The Madness of Dr. Caligari
- "But Only Because I Love You", Dreams from the Witch House
- "The Stricken", Tomorrow’s Cthulhu
- "Civilization and its Discontented", Aleriel, A Voyage to Other Worlds: The lost classic of Victorian science fiction, with a new sequel
- "The Curse of the Old Ones" (with Jesse Bullington), Cthulhu Fthagn!
- "The Thing on the Cheerleading Squad", She Walks in Shadows
- "One Hot Chapatha", Strange Aeons
- "Do Not Loiter in the Glen", Burning Maiden 2
- "La Fée Verte", Gods, Memes, and Monsters
- "Grave-Worms", Cassilda's Song
- "Four Seasons in the Floating World" (with Jesse Bullington), Pornokitsch.com
- "Hieron Aigypton", The Starry Wisdom Library
- "Food From the Clouds", Letters to Lovecraft
- "Good Lord, Show Me The Way", Children of Old Leech
- "Qi Sport", Schemers
- "Mysterium Tremendum", The Book of the Dead
- "Tantivy", Zombies: Shambling Through the Ages
- "Ho Pais Kalos", Geek Love: An Anthology of Full Frontal Nerdery
- "All This For the Greater Glory of the 7th and 329th Children of the Black Goat of the Woods", The Magazine of Bizarro Fiction #7
- "Herbert West in Love", The Lovecraft eZine, December 2012
- "Tubby McMungus, Fat from Fungus" (co-authored with Jesse Bullington), Fungi
- "The Poison-Well", The Lion and the Aardvark
- "Hour of the Tortoise", The Book of Cthulhu II
- "Holiday at Two Hoots", Coming Together: Arm in Arm in Arm
- "Go, Go, Go, Said the Byakhee", Future Lovecraft
- "How John Wilmot Contracted Syphilis", Lacuna, October 2011
- "The Devil's Bride", Palimpsest: A Creative Journal of the Humanities
- "The Infernal History of the Ivybridge Twins", Historical Lovecraft, reprinted in The Book of Cthulhu
- "In Sheep's Clothing", Running with the Pack

=== Anthology appearances ===
- "The Real You™". The Big Book of Cyberpunk. Vintage Books. 2023. ISBN 978-0593467237.
