= John Sunseri =

American novelist

- Born: March 11, 1969 (age 57); Portland, Oregon, United States
- Occupation: Writer
- Writing career
- Period: mid 2000s-present
- Genres: horror, science fiction
- Website: freewebs.com/john_sunseri

John Sunseri (born March 11, 1969) is a horror writer from Portland, Oregon in the United States. As well as writing traditional horror fiction he also writes Lovecraftian horror. John spent two years at Yale University studying a major in English. Today he manages a restaurant.

Writing since 2001, John has published over 50 short stories. In 2007 he released his first novel, The Spiraling Worm co-written with Australian author David Conyers.

== Books ==
=== The Jack Dixon/Harrison Peel series ===
Modern-day Lovecraftian horror series set in the world of spies and government conspiracies.

- The Spiraling Worm (2007), with David Conyers, ISBN 1-56882-212-X

=== Anthology appearances ===
- When the Ship Came (2007), Horrors Beyond II, ed. William Jones, Elder Signs Press.
- Not What One Does (2007) with C. J. Henderson, Lai Wan: Tales of the Dreamwalker, ed. William Jones, Marietta Publishing.
- A Little Job in Arkham (2006), Hardboiled Cthulhu, ed. James Ambuehl, Elder Signs Press.
- The Hades Project (2005), Horrors Beyond, ed. William Jones, Elder Signs Press.

=== Select magazine appearances ===
- A Business Proposal (2005) Black Petals Autumn Issue
- Household Gods (2005), Bare Bone #7
- A Prayer for the Silent, Bare Bone #8
- Spirits of Earth and Sky (2005), Cthulhu Sex v2 #22
- A Voice Was Heard in Ramah (2005), Black Petals Summer Issue
- Enter the Dragon (2004), Black Petals Summer Issue
- Rag Doll (2004), Bare Bone #5
- To Catch a Ghost (2004), Black Petals Spring Issue
