= Notebook Found in a Deserted House =

- Short story by Robert Bloch
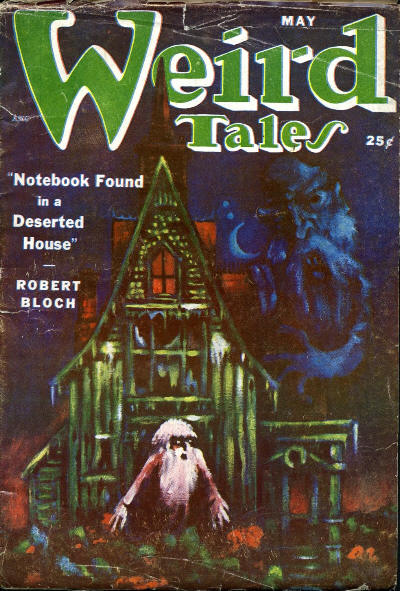
- Country: United States
- Language: English
- Genre: Short story

Publication
- Published in: Weird Tales
- Publication type: Magazine
- Media type: Print (Periodical)
- Publication date: May 1951

"Notebook Found in a Deserted House" is a Cthulhu Mythos short story by American writer Robert Bloch. It was first published in the May 1951 issue of Weird Tales.

== Synopsis ==
As the title implies, the entire text is that of a notebook found in an empty house. The notebook is written by Willie Osborne, a farm boy who had lived with his grandmother until she died.

During the time he lived with his grandmother, she told him about entities she called "them ones", which apparently live in the mysterious forest around the farm that his Aunt Lucy and Uncle Fred own. "Them ones" seem to be most active during Halloween, as Willie's grandmother claims people have heard the sound of drums coming from the forest at that time.

After his grandmother's death, Willie goes to live with his aunt and uncle. His ideas about strange beings inhabiting the forest are supported by the fact that his aunt and uncle always lock the doors at night and never enter the woods after dark. Even more strangely, the forest seems to be devoid of animal life. Willie thinks the answer is that a cult of Druids, possibly having come over from before the time of Columbus, lives in the woods.

In October, Willie has a disquieting experience in the forest. Late in the day, he hears something coming towards him. Hiding behind a rock, Willie smells an awful stench and hears an unearthly voice say something in an equally unearthly language, in which is the word "shoggoth" and the sounds "shub nigger ath". Willie investigates the spot where the entity went by and discovers what appear to be hundreds of hoof marks and a foul-smelling slime, not unlike that which comes out of a mysterious old well on the farm. For many nights after, he dreams of the creature that made the hoof-prints.

Things take a turn for the worse as Halloween nears. Willie's cousin, Frank, was supposed to come visit for Halloween. When the buggy that Fred went out in to bring him to the farm comes back empty, Lucy faints. A few days later, on Halloween, Lucy disappears herself.

When Willie tries to escape, the situation is compounded when a man claiming to be Cousin Osborne shows up, saying that he did not arrive earlier due to business. Willie explains to him the situation, wisely leaving out his experience in the woods and his idea of what might be out there. When Osborne shows knowledge of Willie's experience anyway, and claims to be from Arkham when Willie knows him to be from Kingsport, it becomes obvious that he is an impostor. Cousin Osborne, claiming to have custody of Willie, orders him to stay indoors. Later, when the mailman, Cap Pritchett, arrives, the fake Osborne insists that Willie is not home. Willie immediately shows himself and asks to be ridden into town. Pritchett, seeing that Cousin Osborne was lying about Willie's presence, agrees to Willie's request. Cousin Osborne warns Willie as he leaves that he is making a mistake.

As Pritchett and Willie go some way, Willie tells him about the recent going-ons and asks Pritchett if he knows what a shoggoth is. When Pritchett tries to answer, a black, log-like creature appears in the road and attacks the horse, pulling Pritchett out as he identifies it as a shoggoth. Willie escapes and comes to a clearing where he sees a cult of people he presumes to be the Druids sacrificing cattle, as well as some people, on an enormous rock with two enormous black marks on its sides. The shoggoth reappears, the same from Willie's nightmares. More terrified than ever, Willie runs away, screaming, and ends up back at the house. He barricades himself inside and writes most of the titular notebook.

The next day, Willie sees Cousin Osborne talking to someone, speaking of getting into the house through an unused well in the backyard, which Willie realizes is an entrance to the underground world where the "Druids" live. The last thing he writes is "The door is banging o–"

== Chaosium ==
The log-like creatures in Bloch's story were identified as shoggoths. Gaming company Chaosium, the creators and publishers of the Call of Cthulhu horror role-playing game, which is based on the works of Lovecraft and other Mythos authors, used the creatures in the Call of Cthulhu bestiary as depicted by Bloch, but identified them as the progeny of Shub-Niggurath (so-called Dark Young) in order to add more monsters to its gaming lines.
