= Trail of Tsathogghua =

Tabletop horror role-playing game adventure

- Cover by Steve Purcell, 1984.
- Designers: Keith Herber
- Publishers: Chaosium
- Publication: 1984, 2004
- Genres: Horror
- Systems: Basic Role-Playing
- ISBN: 0-933635-05-2

Trail of Tsathogghua is a trilogy of adventures published by Chaosium in 1984 for the horror role-playing game Call of Cthulhu, itself based on the works of H.P. Lovecraft.

== Contents ==
Trail of Tsathogghua is a collection of three adventures set in Greenland, British Columbia, and Grand Rapids, Michigan, that can either be linked together or played separately. The adventures feature Clark Ashton Smith's god-like literary creation Tsathoggua. The first adventure starts with the Investigators examining the unusual markings on a stone slab that was discovered by Greenland Inuit inside a glacier.

== Publication history ==
Call of Cthulhu was published by Chaosium in 1981, and immediately proved popular. Many adventures were subsequently published, including Trail of Tsathogghua, which was written by Keith Herber, with art by Steve Purcell and cartography by Michael Blum, and published in 1984. That same year, Henri Balczesak translated it into French, and publisher Descartes Editeur released La trace de Tsathogghua in France using the same illustrations by Purcell.

== Reception ==
In Issue 33 of the French games magazine Jeux et Stratégie, Fabrice Cayla reviewed the French translation La trace de Tsathogghua, and noted that the primary enemy in the Greenland and British Columbia scenarios seemed to be the cold weather. He noted "You will uncover the history of this frozen land, dating back to a time before humanity when certain 'entities' dwelt there." But Cayla found the 1985 price (in France) of 99 francs was too expensive.

In Issue 34 of Abyss, J.R. Davies called this "well written. It mangles and misapplies Celtic and Chthulhian mythos with cheerful abandon. It has a nice balance of light and grim moments." Davies believed this adventure was "an enjoyable, involved scenario and will be fun for most Call of Cthulhu devotees." However, Davies pointed out that this adventure was very similar in theme and scope to many of the adventures published in the past three years. "It has all the scary elements, all the nameless, shuddering horrors, but it is no longer new and it makes this scenario look an awful lot like formulaic hack work." Davies concluded, "It might be a worthwhile investment, but don't expect anything new and exciting."

In The Space Gamer No. 75., Rick Swan commented "If you've been happily devouring Chaosium's Cthulhu releases, rest assured that Trail of Tsathogghua is another top-notch effort. This is roleplaying at its finest, and I'm ready for the next one. And who knows . . . maybe it'll even have a title I can pronounce."
