= Lois H. Gresh =

American novelist

Lois Harriet Gresh is a New York Times Best-Selling author of thirteen science fiction novels and story collections and seventeen popular science and pop culture books, some in collaboration with Robert Weinberg. Gresh has also written approximately seventy short stories. Her work spans genres such as mysteries, thriller, suspense, dark fantasy, horror, and science fiction. She is probably best known for weird science fiction stories, which blend computer technology with biology, botany, and post-cyberpunk. She was a staff book reviewer for Science Fiction Weekly from November 2004 through December 2008.

Her books have been translated into twenty-two languages and are in print worldwide: Italy, Japan, Spain, Russia, Germany, Portugal, France, Brazil, Thailand, Korea, China, Estonia, England, Canada/French, Finland, Poland, Czech, etc. They have been reviewed in the New York Times Book Review, USA Today, Entertainment Weekly, Science News, National Geographic, Physics Today, New Scientist, and U.S. News & World Report, as well as by National Public Radio, the BBC, Fox News, the History Channel, and other television and radio programs. Gresh is a frequent guest on science and pop culture television programs. Gresh' teen novels have been endorsed by the American Library Association and the Voice of Youth Advocates .

Lois Gresh is married to Experimental Particle Physicist Arie Bodek.

== Works ==
- The Termination Node, Random House/Del Rey, science fiction novel, adult, 1999 hc/pb, co-author Robert Weinberg
- The Computers of Star Trek, Basic Books, science, adult, 2000 hc/trade, co-author Robert Weinberg
- DragonBall Z, St. Martin's Press, young adult, 2000 trade
- TechnoLife 2020, science+novella, ECW Press, adult, 2001 trade
- Chuck Farris and the Tower of Darkness, science fiction novel, young adult, ECW Press, 2001 trade
- Chuck Farris and the Labyrinth of Doom, science fiction novel, young adult, ECW Press, 2001 trade
- Chuck Farris and the Cosmic Storm, science fiction novel, young adult, ECW Press, 2002 trade
- The Science of Superheroes, John Wiley & Sons, science, adult, 2002 hc/trade, co-author Robert Weinberg
- The Science of Supervillains, John Wiley & Sons, science, adult, 2004 hc/trade, co-author Robert Weinberg
- The Science of James Bond, John Wiley & Sons, science, adult, 2006 trade, co-author Robert Weinberg
- The Science of Anime, science, adult, 2005 trade, co-author Robert Weinberg
- Exploring Lemony Snicket, St. Martin's Press, science, young adult, 2004 hc
- The Unauthorized Eragon Guide, St. Martin's Press, science, young adult, 2006 trade
- The Unauthorized Guide to His Dark Materials, St. Martin's Press, science, young adult/adult, 2007 trade
- The Science of Stephen King, John Wiley & Sons, science, adult, 2007 hc, co-author Robert Weinberg
- The Fan's Unauthorized Guide to the Spiderwick Chronicles, St. Martin's Press, science, young adult, 2007 trade
- The Unauthorized Guide to Artemis Fowl, St. Martin's Press, science, young adult, 2008 trade
- The Many Mysteries of Indiana Jones, John Wiley & Sons, science, adult, 2008 trade, co-author Robert Weinberg
- The Twilight Companion - The Unauthorized Guide to the Series, St. Martin's Press, young adult, 2008 trade
- The Hunger Games Companion, St. Martin's Press, 2011 trade
- Eldritch Evolutions, Chaosium, 2011 trade
- Blood and Ice, Elder Signs Press, 2011, trade
- The Mortal Instruments Companion, St. Martin's Press, 2013
- Dark Fusions, PS Publishing, 2013
- The Divergent Companion, St. Martin's Press, 2014
- Sherlock Holmes vs. Cthulhu: The Adventure of the Deadly Dimensions, Titan Books, 2017
- Sherlock Holmes vs. Cthulhu: The Adventure of the Neural Psychoses, Titan Books, 2018
- Sherlock Holmes vs. Cthulhu: The Adventure of the Innsmouth Mutations, Titan Books, 2019

== Sources ==
- Review of TechnoLife 2020 by A.L. Sirois on SF Site.com
