= Blair Reynolds =

American artist

Blair Earl Reynolds
- Born: January 11, 1962
- Died: August 12, 2021 (aged 59)

Blair Earl Reynolds (January 11, 1962 – August 12, 2021) was a fantasy artist and writer whose work appeared in various tabletop role-playing games and periodicals.

== Early life ==
Blair Reynolds was born in Ames, Iowa to James and Carrie Reynolds. He studied photography at college, but moved to University of Missouri, where he graduated with a degree in pharmaceuticals and became a certified pharmaceutical technician. While attending university, Blair and some acquaintances started up a publishing company, with Blair providing the illustrations.

== The Unspeakable Oath ==
When Reynolds was 26, John Tynes founded Pagan Publishing in 1990 as a vehicle for material related generally to the works of H.P. Lovecraft, and specifically to the horror role-playing game Call of Cthulhu. The company's first publication was the photocopied digest-sized fanzine The Unspeakable Oath, and Reynolds provided the black & white cover art as well as some of the interior art. As the magazine developed into a professionally printed magazine, Reynolds continued to produce the cover art, which reviewer Allen Varney called "unsettling".

In Issues #2 and #4 of The Unspeakable Oath, Reynolds also contributed the first two installments of a serial graphic novel, "Remnant".

Reynolds also contributed a written piece to Issue #4 (December 1991), "From the Investigative Journals of Mikhail Aksakov", but it was his cover art that was notable, featuring a topless multi-armed female god. In 1994, editor John Tynes commented that frontal nudity at the time was "a real taboo in gaming". Despite this, Pagan Publishing did not suffer any serious repercussions.

However, there were repercussions the following year when Pagan Publishing released Courting Madness, an anthology of pieces from The Unspeakable Oath. The cover art by Reynolds featured a nude Rubenesque woman who seemed to be engaging sexual acts with a Cthulhu Mythos creature. TSR, Inc., which at the time owned the popular Gencon annual gaming convention, banned Pagan Publishing from selling copies of the anthology at Gencon 25.

== Games 208 ==
Reynolds also did art for Digest Group Publications, but when the company began to fail, they paid some contributors, including Reynolds, either late or not at all. This exacerbated the discontent that Reynolds was beginning to feel about the games industry, which he felt was limiting his ability to explore the erotic and perverse boundaries of the Cthulhu mythos. In 1994, he stopped providing artwork and prose to industry publications in order to focus on his own personal projects via his own company, Games 208.

Reynolds wanted to publish edgy Cthulhu mythos materials, and the first work was the sexually explicit horror graphic novel Black Sands (1996). However, that was the last publication of Games 308 until The Mysteries of Mesoamerica appeared in 2008.

== Return to games industry ==
Following the publication of Black Sands, Reynolds returned to the games industry to illustrate The Unspeakable Oath, now a professionally printed full-sized and full-colour publication. Reynolds also found work illustrating various pieces for MegaTraveller by Games Designers Workshop, and Blue Planet (1997) by Biohazard Games.

He also provided artwork for Pagan Publishing's Call of Cthulhu campaign The Realm of Shadows (1997), which elicited special comment from reviewer Ray Winninger, who called his reaction to the illustrations "a uniquely Lovecraftian and unsettling experience the first time I flipped through this booklet [...] I stumbled over Reynolds' drawings of horrifying ghouls and monstrosities, all executed in the same photorealistic style."

When Pagan Publishing released a new present-day military setting for Call of Cthulhu called Delta Green, Reynolds provided the sexually explicit story "Operation Looking Glass" for the companion fiction anthology Delta Green: Alien Intelligence (1998), and created the cover art for the sourcebook Delta Green: Countdown (1999).

== Personal life ==
Reynolds had met Toni Warner in Missouri when they were both teens. Thirty years later, after Reynolds had settled in Mesa, Arizona, he reconnected with Toni, and they were married in 2013.

Reynolds had lived with a heart defect since childhood, but it became more serious later in life, and he died on August 12, 2021 aged 59.
