= John H. Crowe III =

Role-playing game designer

- Occupation: Game designer

John H. Crowe III is a game designer who has worked primarily on role-playing games.

== Career ==
John H. Crowe III was one of the staff members in the early days at Pagan Publishing. Crowe contributed Call of Cthulhu weapons statistics to the magazine The Unspeakable Oath which were later included in The Weapons Compendium (1993) along with new weapons. John Scott Tynes moved Pagan Publishing to Seattle in 1994, so Dennis Detwiller, Brian Appleton and Crowe agreed to move to Seattle as well. Crowe authored the supplements Walker in the Wastes (1994) and Coming Full Circle (1995) which were the only two supplements that Pagan published over the next year after moving. Crowe contributed to Mortal Coils in 1998 and thereafter stayed involved as part of the editorial staff. Crowe and Appleton wrote the Call of Cthulhu books Final Flight (2008) and The Mysteries of Mesoamerica (2009) which were published by Pagan. Crowe also wrote The Realm of Shadows (1997) and Bumps in the Night (2011).
