= Jeff Barber =

American role-playing game designer

- Occupation: Game designer

Jeffrey Barber is a game designer from Columbia, Missouri. He has worked primarily on role-playing games, notably Blue Planet and the Midnight setting for D&D.

== Career ==
Barber began his game-writing career as a volunteer staff member at Pagan Publishing. There he collaborated with John Scott Tynes, co-writing the 1993 scenario "Grace under pressure" for Call of Cthulhu. In 1994 when Pagan Publishing moved to Seattle, Barber and others left the company and founded Biohazard Games.

Biohazard's first product was Barber's 1995 booklet Killer Crosshairs. In 1997 they published the first of several editions of the Blue Planet role-playing game, with Barber as a main writer. He was also heavily involved with the Midnight campaign setting for D&D of 2003-2007 from Fantasy Flight Games. He collaborated on these projects with Greg Benage.
