= Creatures & Cultists =

Card game

Creatures & Cultists is a card game for 3–5 players that was published by Pagan Publishing in 1993.

== Publication history ==
Creatures & Cultists, designed by Jeff Barber and John Tynes, with contributions by Dennis Detwiller and Jonathan Tweet, and with card art by J. Todd Kingrea and cover art by Chris Prynoski, originally appeared in the Fall 1991 edition of The Unspeakable Oath (Issue #4). Pagan Press, publishers of The Unspeakable Oath, then released Creatures & Cultists in 1993 as a stand-alone card game.

== Gameplay ==
Creatures & Cultists is a light-hearted game in which 3–5 players create cults that then attempt to summon Cthulhu Mythos gods and bring about total destruction of the world. The game comes as an 8.5" x 11" book with 8 player sheets, 4 pages of rules, and cardstock sheets with 128 playing cards that need to be removed from the game and cut apart. Play also requires several 6-sided dice, which are not supplied.

=== Cult generation and set-up ===
Each player decides on a name, a motto, and a symbol for their cult, and then generates initial scores for three skills: Conjuring, Sorcery and Thuggery. Each player has a player sheet that displays the 24 members of their cult, arranged in three rows of 8. Each player turns their player sheet towards the other players so that the front row of cultists is facing the centre of the table. Each player is then dealt six cards.

=== The round ===
A round consists of one turn by each player.

- The first action during each round is to determine which cult is "favored by the stars." (That player takes the last turn of the round, but adds +2 to all dice rolls during the player's turn.)
- Players then replenish their hands back up to six cards, if necessary.
- The player to the right of the "favored" person plays a turn, and play continues to the right, until the "favored" person plays last.

=== The turn ===
On each turn, the active player must first play any Mondo cards that are held, drawing from the deck to replace these as they are played. The active player can then do any of the following in any order:

- Play Event cards or Sorcery cards (which may affect the player positively or another cult negatively)
- Using one of the player's cultists in the front row of their player sheet, play a Thuggery or Conjuring card against any other player's cult member that is currently in the enemy cult's front row.
  - The active player may play any number of Thuggery of Conjuring cards each turn, but is limited to only one attack from each surviving cultist in their front row.
  - In addition, only one attack can be targeted against any one enemy cult member each turn.
  - Each enemy cultist killed earns the active player's cult the number of "Fuggly Points" listed on the dead cultist's card.
    - A certain number of Fuggly Points are required to win the game, but can also be spent to gain bonuses to die rolls, or to achieve desired effects on a few special cards.
- The active player can discard any number of cards if desired
- If the active player's cult is currently "favored by the stars" and the cult has earned enough Fuggly Points, the cult can attempt to summon its deity and destroy the world.

=== Combat ===
To make an attack, the active player chooses one of their front-line cultists to make the attack, rolls three 6-sided dice, adds the attacking cultist's bonus, and subtracts the target's defensive modifier. If the total is equal to or higher than the active cult's relevant skill, the attack is successful. An outstanding success (a "spooge") will result in an extra positive effect, usually to the detriment of the defending player. A critical failure (a "boof") will result in a bad thing happening against the attacking player. Successfully removing an enemy cultist from play nets the attacking player the dead cultist's Fuggly Points.

=== Winning the game ===
A cult with the requisite number of Fuggly Points and that is currently "favored by the stars" can attempt to summon its deity to destroy the world. If successful, that player is the winner.

== Reception ==
In the January 1994 edition of Pyramid (Issue #5), Chris W. McCubbin found the game components to be "as excellent as you can reasonably expect for a company their size", but found that "although the basic rules are very clear and readable, they too often break down when it comes to specifics and special cases." Nonetheless, McCubbin found the good outweighed the bad, saying "Creatures & Cultists is about as good as any game with a list price under $10 can possibly be (or at least it will be once those pesky rules ambiguities are cleared up). It's an entertaining and unpretentious little game, and while it will never be a Hacker, much less a Magic: The Gathering, for groups with the right sense of humor this game could become a long-lasting favorite."

In the April 1994 edition of Dragon (Issue #204), Lester W. Smith admitted to being "surprised at just how lightheartedly silly it turned out to be, well, lightheartedly silly for a horror product... For players of the Call of Cthulhu game, it is a refreshing change of pace from watching favorite characters slowly go mad while pursuing mind-blastingly horrible creatures from beyond time and space." Overall, Smith found the game to be "well designed and a lot of fun to play." He only found fault with one card, which forces one cult to automatically "boof" its next roll. If played on a cult that is about to try to win the game by summoning its deity, this card results in the deity destroying the cult instead, knocking that player out of the game. Smith advised players to make a house rule that playing the card in such a way results in an ordinary failure, not a "boof". Other than that, Smith gave the game a rating of 4 out of 6, saying, "I'm quite fond of this game. In my opinion, it is a great value for a modest price."
