= Killer Crosshairs =

Tabletop role-playing game supplement

- Designers: Jeff Barber
- Publishers: Biohazard Games
- Publication: 1995; 31 years ago
- Systems: Universal

Killer Crosshairs, subtitled "What Gun Control Was Meant To Be!", is the first product published by Biohazard Games, a role-playing game supplement released in 1995.

== Description ==
Killer Crosshairs is a hit-location system intended to be used for any role-playing game system. The supplement contains two transparent plastic overlay grids, and a 24-page rulebook. Included in the rule book are ten silhouettes of various targets from men and women to horses and cats.

Before making a missile attack against an opponent using any weapon from a thrown axe to a modern firearm, the attacker places one of the plastic overlay sheets over the silhouette that most closely matches the target. After making a die roll for an attack, the player consults the Systems Conversion section of the rules for the particular role-playing system being used to determine a location value. The player then uses the location value on the plastic overlay sheet to determine exactly what part of the body the missile, weapon or bullet hit.

== Publication history ==
Biohazard Games of Columbia, Missouri was started after Pagan Publishing made the decision to move from Columbia to Seattle. Some of those who chose to stay in Columbia, including Jeff Barber, founded Biohazard Games. Biohazard's first product was Killer Crosshairs, a 24-page saddle-stapled softcover book designed by Jeff Barber, with artwork by Barber, Domenic di Ciacca, and Chip Martin.

== Reception ==
In Issue 231 of Dragon (July 1996), Rick Swan called Killer Crosshairs "the Oddball of the Month", but then admitted that it was "quick, accurate, and disturbingly realistic." Although Swan nitpicked that the system did not make any adjustments for moving targets, he concluded by recommending it, saying, "If you’re a marksman who absolutely, positively has to know if you skewered that pussy cat's paw or just nicked its whiskers, this is a must."

== Other reviews ==
- Shadis #26 (April, 1996)
