= Robert Greenberger =

American writer and editor (born 1958)

- Greenberger at Dragon Con in 2026
- Born: July 24, 1958 (age 68) Brooklyn, New York
- Areas: Writer, Editor

Robert Greenberger (born July 24, 1958) is an American writer and editor known for his work on Comics Scene, Starlog, Weekly World News, the novelization of the film Hellboy II, and for the executive positions he held at both Marvel Comics and DC Comics. He also served as an elected office holder in his hometown of Fairfield, Connecticut.

== Early life ==
Greenberger was born to a Jewish family in Brooklyn, New York, the son of Edwin L. and Joan Greenberger. He attended Binghamton University, where he wrote and edited for the college newspaper, Pipe Dream, and also interned at the Binghamton Sun-Bulletin.

== Career ==
Following his graduation, he worked as an editor for Comics Scene and Starlog Press until 1984, when he joined DC Comics as an assistant editor. Greenberger was hired to assist Len Wein and Marv Wolfman by the then-DC Vice President/Executive Editor Dick Giordano. The company was organizing its output with the major comic book crossover Crisis on Infinite Earths and the guidebook Who's Who: The Definitive Directory of the DC Universe. Based on his work during this period, Greenberger was promoted to editor the following year, being assigned the titles Doom Patrol, Star Trek, and Suicide Squad. Under his editorship, the DC Comics adaptations of several Star Trek films were released, and his editorial work on the Star Trek comics led to numerous contributions to the franchise's novel series. In 2001, he and novel editor John J. Ordover developed the seven-book crossover miniseries Gateways. Greenberger wrote the third novel of the series, as well as the concluding novella. He worked at DC until 2000, having risen to the position of Manager-Editorial Operations. During this time, he worked on such titles as The Warlord, Lois Lane, Action Comics Weekly, Time Masters, Secret Origins, The Hacker Files and others.

Greenberger became involved in local politics in his home of Fairfield, Connecticut, beginning in 1999, initially as member of the Parking Authority from 1999 to June 2006, when he resigned to join the Cable Advisory Council for Area 2 in Connecticut. In November 2005, he was elected a Representative to Fairfield's Representative Town Meeting, and following his reelection in November 2007 was made its Moderator. After losing the 2009 election, he was appointed to represent Fairfield on the Greater Bridgeport Regional Planning Agency through June 2011. He also served as vice-chair of Fairfield's Democratic Town Committee and retired from the post in 2013 when he relocated from Fairfield, Connecticut to Maryland.

Greenberger left DC in 2000 and joined the online company Gist Communications. This break with the comics industry lasted until 2001, when he joined Marvel Comics as Director-Publishing Operations. Greenberger was hired to work under Joe Quesada, but was let go during a tumultuous reorganization overseen by Bill Jemas. He soon rejoined DC Comics as a Senior Editor for Collected Editions, but was terminated from his position in 2006 after a reorganization at DC and a publishing error which saw copies of the Golden Age Hawkman Archives printed with pages in an incorrect order. His firing was criticized by comic book writers Peter David and Christopher Priest. Greenberger found work as a freelance writer and editor, working for such companies as Weekly World News, Platinum Studios, Syfy, Famous Monsters of Filmland, and ComicMix.com, as well as both DC and Marvel. From June 2006 to August 2007, he served as Managing Editor at Weekly World News.

== Personal life ==
Greenberger married Deborah Upton in 1980. They are the parents to Kathleen Michelle (born 1986) and Robert Edward Jr. (born 1988, died 2008).

== Selected bibliography ==
=== Novels ===
- Doomsday World (Star Trek: The Next Generation (TNG), with Peter David, Carmen Carter, and Michael Jan Friedman, 1991)
- The Disinherited (Star Trek, with Peter David and Michael Jan Friedman, 1992)
- The Romulan Stratagem (TNG, 1995)
- Wrath of the Prophets (Star Trek: Deep Space Nine, with Peter David and Michael Jan Friedman, 1997)
- Time Station Berlin (as David Evans, 1997)
- Doors Into Chaos (TNG, 2001)
- A Time to Love (TNG, 2004)
- A Time to Hate (TNG, 2004)
- Flesh & Blood (Predator, with Michael Jan Friedman, 2007)
- Hellboy II: The Golden Army (film novelization, 2008, winner Scribe Award for Best Adapted Novel - Speculative, 2009)
- Batman: Arctic Attack (2009)
- Femme Fatales (Iron Man, 2009)
- Batman: Hunt the Dark Knight (2010)
- Murder At Sorrow's Crown (Sherlock Holmes, with Steven Savile, 2016)

=== Short stories and novellas ===
- "Memories of Erin" (1997)
- "Solo" (1998)
- "Hour of Fire" (Star Trek, 2000)
- "The Other Side" (TNG, 2001)
- Past Life (Star Trek: Starfleet Corps of Engineers (SCE), 2002)
- "A Matter of Faith" (2002)
- Buying Time (SCE, 2003)
- "Lefler's Logs" (Star Trek: New Frontier, 2003)
- "A Song Well Sung" (Star Trek, 2004)
- "Command Code" (Star Trek: Voyager, 2005)
- "The Landing Party" (Star Trek, 2006)
- "Things That Aren't" (with Michael A. Burstein, 2007)
- "Rain of Tears" (Zorro, 2007)
- Troubleshooting (SCE, 2007)
- A Weary Life (TNG, 2007)
- "Ghost Stories: Peace" (After Earth, 2013)
- "Ghost Stories: Redemption (After Earth, 2013) - Nominated for a 2014 Scribe Award

=== Comic books ===
- Action Comics #574 (1985)
- Batman Annual #12 (1988)
- Batman: The Brave and the Bold #20 (2010)
- Crisis on Infinite Earths #1 (1985)
- DC Comics Presents #94 (1986)
- Firestorm, the Nuclear Man vol. 2 #80 (1988)
- Scooby-Doo, Where Are You? #6 (2011)
- Secret Origins vol. 2 #28 (Nightshade) (1988)
- Star Trek #27 (1986)
- Suicide Squad #38 (1990)

=== Other ===
- Q's Guide to the Continuum Star Trek reference book with Michael Jan Friedman, Pocket Books 1998 ISBN 978-0671019488
- The DC Comics Encyclopedia: The Definitive Guide to the Characters of the DC Universe with Phil Jimenez, Scott Beatty and Dan Wallace, Dorling Kindersley 2004 ISBN 978-0756605926
- The Essential Batman Encyclopedia, Del Rey Books 2008 ISBN 978-0345501066
- The Batman Vault: A Museum-in-a-Book with Rare Collectibles from the Batcave with Matthew K. Manning, Running Press 2009 ISBN 0-7624-3663-8
- The Essential Superman Encyclopedia with Martin Pasko, Del Rey Books 2010 ISBN 0-345-50108-X
- The Spider-Man Vault: A Museum-in-a-Book with Rare Collectibles Spun from Marvel's Web with Peter David, Running Press 2010 ISBN 0-7624-3772-3

Preceded by Julius Schwartz	Secret Origins vol. 2 editor 1986–1987	Succeeded by Roy Thomas
Preceded by n/a	Suicide Squad editor 1987–1989	Succeeded by Dan Raspler
Preceded by Mike Gold	Doom Patrol vol. 2 editor 1988–1989	Succeeded by Mark Waid
