= The Golden Dawn (Call of Cthulhu) =

Tabletop horror role-playing game supplement

A Sourcebook of Victorian Ocult Intrigue
- Cover by John T. Snyder
- Designers: Scott Aniolowski; Carrie Hall; Steve Hatherley; Alan Smithee; John T. Snyder; John Tynes
- Publishers: Pagan Publishing
- Publication: 1996; 30 years ago
- Genres: Horror
- Systems: Basic Roleplaying
- ISBN: 1-887797-02-5

The Golden Dawn is a Horror Fiction supplement published under license by Pagan Publishing in 1996 for Chaosium's horror role-playing game Call of Cthulhu.

== Contents ==
The Golden Dawn is a sourcebook that describes the Victorian-era secret occult society called the Golden Dawn that included among its members William Butler Yeats and Aleister Crowley. Gamemasters can use the book to bolster their campaign, and to help interested players create player character Investigators currently serving as active members of the society. The book details notable members of the Golden Dawn, expected meeting places and other locales, and the society's secret rites and magical rituals. The book also includes four adventure scenarios.

== Publication history ==
Chaosium originally set their 1981 horror role-playing game Call of Cthulhu in 1920s New England, the same setting as many of the fictional works of H.P. Lovecraft. 1986's Cthulhu by Gaslight moved the setting to Victorian England. The Golden Dawn, published under license by Pagan Publishing in 1996, is also set in the Victorian era, a 192-page softcover book designed by Scott Aniolowski, Carrie Hall, Steve Hatherley, Alan Smithee, John T. Snyder, and John Tynes, with artwork by Dennis Detwiller and Daniel Gelon, and cover art by John T. Snyder.

== Reception ==
In the July 1996 edition of Arcane (Issue #8), Steve Faragher gave this book an average rating of 7 out of 10 and cautioned that "There's certainly some excellent information about the Golden Dawn contained in this book, but if you're at all like me, you'll be keeping your players at the outskirts of the Golden Dawn's power structure. Beyond that I can heartily recommend this sourcebook for its superb scenarios, even though you might think it's a bit expensive for that alone."

Pyramid magazine reviewed The Golden Dawn and stated that "The Golden Dawn, Pagan Publishing's third large-scale addition to the world of Lovecraft-inspired gaming, is perhaps their strongest effort yet. The Golden Dawn, at 192 pages, offers well-researched and accurate historical information on the development and membership of England's most famous occult society, broadens the scope of Call of Cthulhu gaming through the addition of the Astral Plane as a setting, and provides four scenarios that further explore a potential left largely untapped in Cthulhu by Gaslight."

In the November 1996 edition of Dragon (Issue #235), Rick Swan called this "the most ambitious supplement [for Call of Cthulhu] in recent memory." He suggested the book could serve as a "springboard for magic-intensive adventures," although he admitted that would be a "major departure for Cthulhu, which in the past has tended to discourage the indiscriminate use of magic." In addition to the abundance of information about the society, Swan called the included scenarios "terrific [...] not particular easy to run [...] but they're loaded with memorable scenes." He concluded by giving the book an excellent rating of 5 out of 6.

== Other reviews ==
- The Familiar, Issue 9 (p. 47)
- Windgeflüster, October 1996 (Issue 34, p. 43, in German)
- Realms of Fantasy
