= Devil's Children =

1993 Call of Cthulhu adventure

Devil's Children is a 1993 role-playing adventure for Call of Cthulhu published by Pagan Publishing.

== Plot summary ==
Devil's Children is an adventure in which the ancestry and fate of the player characters is explored.

== Publication history ==
Shannon Appelcline explained that by 1992 Pagan Publishing started publishing compilations of material from The Unspeakable Oath, and that "Pagan started publishing original supplements around the same time, beginning with Alone on Halloween (1992), a solo adventure. However, it was another year before Pagan put out the first supplement that really foreshadowed their later success: Devil's Children (1993), an adventure with chapters set in 1692 Salem and 1992 Arkham. By this time Chaosium had already extended the core Call of Cthulhu game in the 1890s and the 1990s but for Pagan's first book-length scenario to make a one-off stop in a totally different time period was original and innovative."

== Reception ==
Wayne Ligon reviewed Devil's Children in White Wolf #43 (May, 1994), rating it a 4.5 out of 5 and stated that "I have to whole-heartedly recommend this adventure, especially at [the price]. I only hope we see more from this team."

== Reviews ==
- Shadis #13 (May, 1994)
- Interactive Fantasy (Issue 2 - 1994)
