= SSZ =

SSZ may refer to:

- The IATA airport code for Santos Air Base in Santos, São Paulo, Brazil
- Spaceship Zero
- Sulfasalazine
- Hyundai Separated Sound Zone
- Serbian Party Oathkeepers (Srpska stranka Zavetnici)
