= Grace Under Pressure =

Grace Under Pressure may refer to:

- Grace Under Pressure (Rush album), a 1984 music album by Rush
- Grace Under Pressure (John Scofield album), a 1992 music album by John Scofield
- "Grace Under Pressure" (Stargate Atlantis), a Stargate Atlantis episode
- "Grace Under Pressure", song by Elbow, from the album Cast of Thousands
- "Grace Under Pressure", song by Eternal, from the album Before the Rain
- "Grace Under Pressure", an episode of the TV series Hill Street Blues celebrating a founding cast member who had died

== See also ==
- The Resurrected Volume One: Grace Under Pressure, a 1993 role-playing adventure for Call of Cthulhu
