= Biohazard Games =

Role-playing game publisher

- Industry: Role-playing games
- Founded: 1994; 31 years ago in Columbia, Missouri, U.S.
- Founder: Jeff Barber
- Headquarters: Columbia, Missouri, U.S.

Biohazard Games is a company located in Columbia, Missouri that publishes role-playing games, most of them designed by Jeff Barber and Jim Heivilin. The company tends to work closely with Fantasy Flight Games.

== History ==
Many Biohazard employees originally produced work for The Unspeakable Oath published by Pagan Press when it was located in Columbia, Missouri. But when Pagan founder John Scott Tynes moved the company to Seattle in 1994, a core of people including Jeff Barber chose to stay in Columbia. Barber subsequently founded Biohazard Games. As game historian Shannon Appelcline explained in the 2014 book Designers & Dragons, "Many of the Pagan volunteers lived together there — and not all of them wanted to move. Jeff Barber and others would leave Pagan as a result. Sadly, their departure was not entirely amicable."

Biohazard's first product was a 1995 supplement for modern-era role-playing games titled Killer Crosshairs. Their next product, and the one they would become known for, was the 1997 role-playing game Blue Planet. As Appelcline noted, "Blue Planet shared at least a little inspiration with Pagan's planned End Time game. The credits from Blue Planet were filled with early The Unspeakable Oath contributors, representing those who had been left behind." Biohazard had only sold 2,700 copies of Blue Planet by 1999, so they made a deal for better distribution with Fantasy Flight Games (FFG), which was looking for a flagship RPG line. FFG took on Barber's partner Greg Benage as an employee to work on the game and rewrite the game's mechanics entirely. FFG supported the game with several supplements over the next few years, and the rights reverted to Biohazard in 2004.

A few years later, RedBrick Limited acquired the license to Blue Planet. RedBrick soon licensed all of its gaming rights to FASA Games, but in late 2013 Biohazard declined to renew the Blue Planet license with FASA Games.

In 2021, Andrew Girdwood interviewed Barber about the third edition of Blue Planet titled Blue Planet: Recontact, and Barber agreed that Biohazard's games tend to reflect contemporary environmental concerns.

== Company products ==
- Killer Crosshairs, Jeff Barber, 1995
- Blue Planet, 1997
- Upwind, Jeff Barber 2017
