= First Colony (Blue Planet) =

First Colony is a 2000 role-playing game supplement published by Biohazard Games for Blue Planet.

== Contents ==
First Colony is a supplement in which the city of Haven on the world of Poseidon is detailed.

== Reviews ==
- Pyramid
- Backstab
- Anduin (Issue 70 - Mar 2002)
