= John Lauritsen =

American gay rights activist

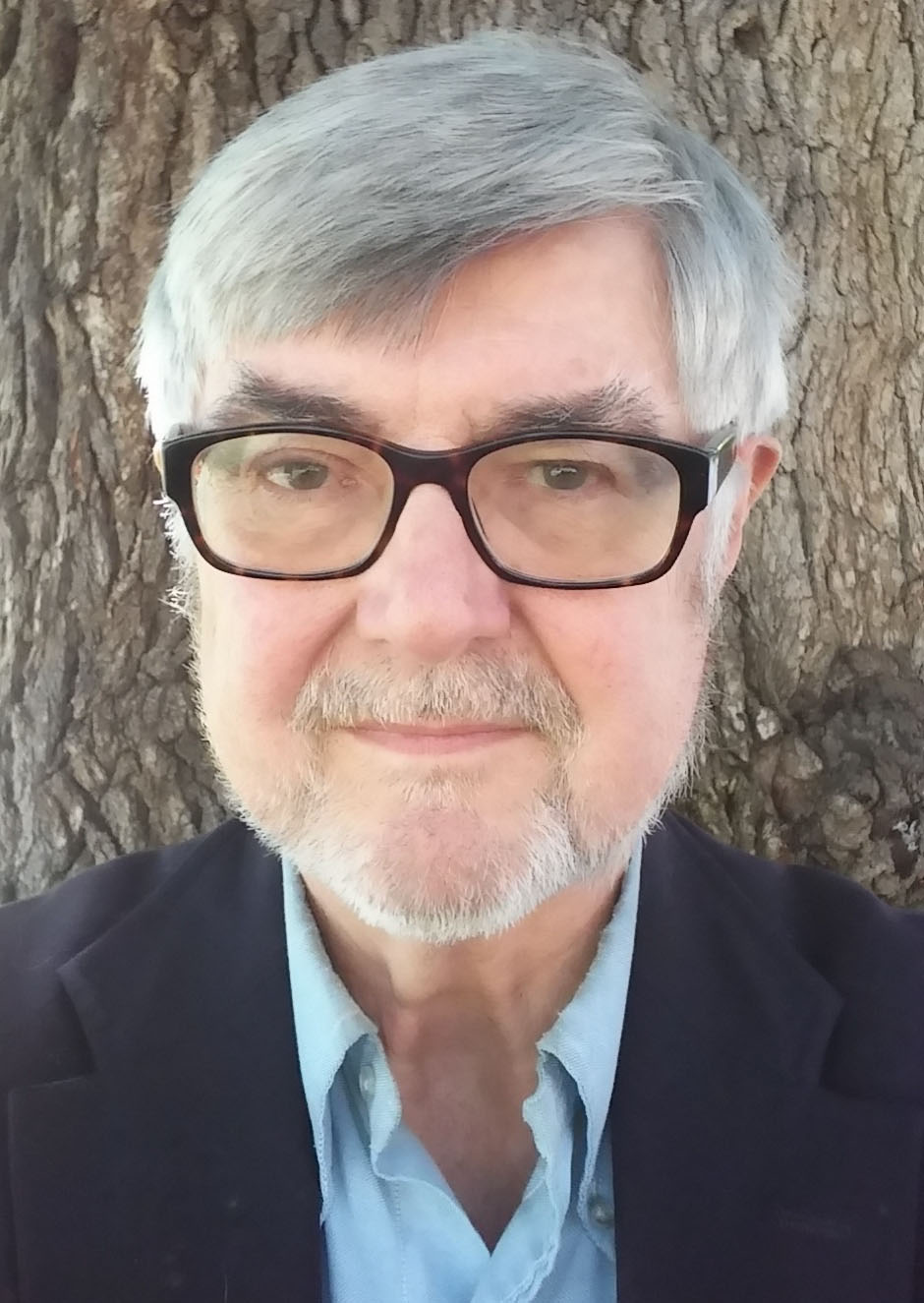
John Lauritsen in 2019

John Lauritsen (5 March 1939 – 5 March 2022) was a gay rights activist, journalist and author.

Lauritsen was born and raised in Nebraska. He received a baccalaureate degree from Harvard College in 1963, and spent most of his life as a market research analyst. Following his retirement, he became a full-time writer and publisher. In 1982, he founded his own imprint, Pagan Press.

With the emergence of the global AIDS pandemic in the early 1980s, Lauritsen became a prominent AIDS denialist. He was an ardent critic of early anti-viral treatments for HIV, including azidothymidine (AZT). His column in the newspaper New York Native urged those with HIV or AIDS not to use AZT. He penned the book Poison By Prescription: The AZT Story which falsely claims AZT causes cancer in humans.

His articles appeared in the New York Native, Gay Books Bulletin, Gay News (London), Civil Liberties Review, The Freethinker (London), Journal of Homosexuality, Christopher Street, Gay & Lesbian Humanist, and Gay & Lesbian Review.

Lauritsen gained scholarly prominence by his claim, in the book The Man Who Wrote Frankenstein, and academic articles, that the novel Frankenstein had been underrated and misinterpreted; that its central theme was male love; and that the real author was Percy Bysshe Shelley. The claim was supported by Camille Paglia.

He also believed biographers had falsified the lives of Percy Bysshe Shelley, Lord Byron, and those of their circle (Thomas Medwin, Edward John Trelawny and Edward Ellerker Williams); that the group had been drawn together by their sexual affinities, and their homosexuality had been historically suppressed. This theory he outlined in his book The Shelley-Byron Men: Lost Angels of a Ruined Paradise.

Lauritsen died suddenly on his 83rd birthday at his home in Dorchester, Massachusetts.

== Bibliography ==
- The Homosexual Rights Movement (1864-1935). (1974)
- The AIDS War: Propaganda, profiteering, and genocide from the medical industrial complex. (1993)
- Poison By Prescription: The AZT Story. Foreword by Peter Duesberg. (1990)
- The AIDS Cult: Essays on the gay health crisis. Edited with Ian Young. (1997)
- Death Rush:Poppers & AIDS. (1998)
- A Freethinker's Primer of Male Love. (1998)
- A Freethinker in Alcoholics Anonymous. (2014)
- The Man Who Wrote Frankenstein. (2007)
- Don Leon & Leon to Annabella. (2017)
- The Shelley-Byron Men: Lost Angels of a Ruined Paradise. (2017)
