= Fireborn =

Role-playing game

- Fireborn cover
- Designers: Greg Benage
- Publishers: Fantasy Flight Games
- Publication: 2004
- Genres: Urban fantasy / High fantasy
- Systems: Custom

Fireborn is a cross-genre role-playing game incorporating elements of urban fantasy and high fantasy.

The game provides a dual-era setting, alternating between London a few years in the future from the present day where the use of magic has been brought back to the world and a mythic age where dragons, giants, and other races fought against each other and against a mysterious enemy.

== History ==
Fireborn (2004) was designed by Rob Vaughn with assistance from Greg Benage, and was released by Fantasy Flight Games as a non-d20 game at a time when d20 publication had greatly reduced.

== Setting ==
The modern part of the game is set in London. In 2001 magic suddenly returned to the world, strange beasts straight out of myths appeared, and society still struggles to come to terms with the fact that from one day to the next the rules of life seemed to have changed. The players take the role of scions, ancient dragons reborn as humans who slowly but surely regain their memories of their former life by so-called flashbacks.

These flashbacks take place in the mythic age, the second part of the game setting. This ancient setting is located in the area of the mediterranean sea and includes powerful civilisations like Atlantis, Kheheb (the predecessor of ancient Egypt), and the courts of the fae. The players (in the shape of dragons) interact with humans, fae, giants, and other creatures and fight against a mysterious enemy called Those who dwell below and the corruption of the world's magical energy (karma).

== Game mechanics ==
Players characters have four aspects (Air, Earth, Fire, Water). For all skill tests a player rolls a number of six sided dice equal to the corresponding aspect score. Skills determine a character's ability to move dice from one aspect to another before making a test, allowing greater chance for success at the cost of temporarily lowering another of the character's aspect dice pools - representing focus and concentration being directed towards particular tasks, such as attacking with no regard for your own defence, or concentrating on a task while not paying attention to your surroundings

== Unique Features ==
Fireborn has a number of (fairly) unique features:

The dynamic attributes system, with its ability to "shift dice" allows players a much greater control over dice mechanics than usual for roleplaying games, adding tactical choices to dice rolling.

The dual time-period play, where the game is played in both the modern age and a fantasy world, is not only unique, but allows the incorporation of many dramatic elements known from movies (flashbacks, foreshadowing, non-linear timeflow) into gaming.

In addition, Fireborn solves two of the more serious player/character problems that plague most roleplaying groups, by incorporating them into the game. Fireborn characters are all telepathic - players will usually discuss game events around the table even if their characters are not within hearing distance of each other. Fireborn characters are also members of one "brood", a karmically linked group of dragons, which helps to reduce stress and conflict between player characters.

== Current Fate ==
Fireborn was discontinued by Fantasy Flight Games in 2006 (unconfirmed) due to financial issues with the company and a "focus on core games" (unconfirmed).

The Fireborn community (see links) is still (2009) actively supporting and expanding the game with new legacies, powers, breeds, etc.

The game books are still available in small quantities from the usual booksellers, as well as in electronic form (PDF files) for download from online sources such as DriveThruRPG.

== Novelization ==
Fantasy Flight Games started publishing novels in the Fireborn universe in 2011.

- Embers of Atlantis (Tracy Hickman, 2011)
- Each Ember's Ghost (Steven Savile, 2012)
- Ritual of Fire (Jordan Ellinger, 2012)
