= Puppetland =

New Style role-playing game by John Scott Tynes

A Storytelling Game with Strings in a Grim World of Make-Believe
- Puppetland. First edition book cover, 1999
- Designers: John Scott Tynes
- Publishers: Arcane Magazine, Hogshead Publishing
- Publication: 1995
- Genres: Horror

Puppetland: A Storytelling Game with Strings in a Grim World of Make-Believe is a role-playing game written by John Scott Tynes.

The game was first published on the author's website in 1995. Its first print publication was in Arcane magazine issue 16 in early 1997, then later by Hogshead Publishing together with Power Kill, a satirical role-playing metagame by the same author, under the title Puppetland/Power Kill. A much expanded edition was published in 2016 by Arc Dream Publishing.

A free edition, including most of the game text is available on the author's web site.

== New Style ==
Puppetland/Powerkill was part of a series experimental/alternative role-playing games published by Hogshead Publishing. Other games in the series included the award-nominated The Extraordinary Adventures of Baron Münchhausen, Pantheon, and Violence.

== Kickstarter and New Edition ==
In November 2014, an expanded version of Puppetland was successfully funded on Kickstarter, to be published by Arc Dream Publishing.
