= Greg Benage =

Role-playing game designer

- Occupation: Game designer

Gregory Benage is an American game designer who has worked primarily on role-playing games.

== Career ==
Greg Benage worked for Biohazard Games, publishers of Blue Planet (1997), which he designed with Jeff Barber. Fantasy Flight Games arranged to publish a new edition of Blue Planet, and as part of the arrangement Fantasy Flight Game wanted someone from Biohazard to join FFG; Benage agreed, and Fantasy Flight spent the year 2000 pushing out an entirely new line of Blue Planet products. Benage decided to rewrite the original game mechanics entirely and polish them up, and as a result the brand new "Synergy" system was created. Benage assisted lead designer Rob Vaughn on the Fireborn RPG from Fantasy Flight.

Benage has written novels in the Eldernost fantasy series.
