= Authorship of Frankenstein =

Debate over the identity of an author

Since the initial publication of Mary Wollstonecraft Shelley's novel Frankenstein; or, The Modern Prometheus in 1818, there has existed uncertainty about the extent to which Mary Shelley's husband, Percy Bysshe Shelley, contributed to the text. Percy is known to have provided input in editing and publishing the manuscript; while most mainstream scholars believe this input to mostly be that of an editor, some scholars have looked at the possibility that Percy had a major creative contribution as well. Based on a transcription of the original manuscript, it is currently believed that Percy contributed about 3,000 words to the 72,000-word novel.

== Background ==
The first edition of Frankenstein; or, The Modern Prometheus was published anonymously on January 1, 1818 in London, with only a dedication to Mary Shelley's father, William Godwin. Several reviewers at the time—including Sir Walter Scott, writing for Blackwood's Edinburgh Magazine—incorrectly assumed Percy (Godwin's son-in-law) to be the author. In his communication with the book's publisher, Percy denied any role whatsoever in the writing of the book, and said that the manuscript had been "consigned to my care by a friend".

Mary Shelley was first credited by name in the 1821 French translation of the novel, entitled Frankenstein, ou le Prométhée moderne, which is attributed to "M.me Shelly [sic]". The second English edition was published two years later in 1823 under the supervision of William Godwin. This edition credited "Mary Wollstonecraft Shelley" as the author, but did not credit Percy for contributing the Preface or his poem "Mutability", giving the impression that Mary had written these as well. In the introduction to the 1831 edition, Mary Shelley states that she does not "owe the suggestion of one incident, nor scarcely of one train of feeling" to Percy. All subsequent editions credit Mary Shelley as the author, and the novel's revised 1831 edition credits Percy as the author of the Preface and "Mutability".

== Debate ==
Questions about the extent of Percy Shelley's contributions were once again raised in 1974 by editor James Rieger, who alleges that Percy "worked on Frankenstein at every stage, from the earliest drafts through the printer's proofs", and suggests that he should be regarded at least as a "minor collaborator". In a 1990 essay, English professor Anne K. Mellor characterized Rieger's claims as biased and exaggerated, and deemed them "explicitly sexist" for implying that Mary Shelley could not have created the work on her own; according to her, Percy most likely acted as an editor of the book.

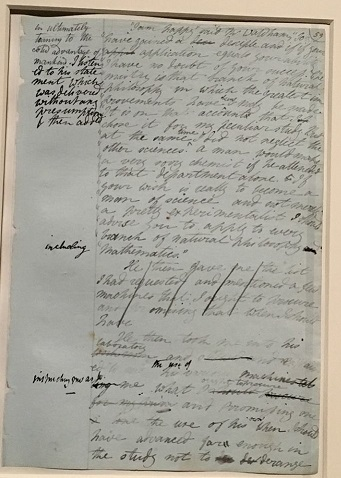
Percy Bysshe Shelley's edits, additions, and emendations in a draft of Frankenstein in darker ink in his handwriting. Bodleian. Oxford.

In her 1993 book, Monstrous Imagination, literary scholar Marie-Hélène Huet draws attention to Percy Shelley's overlooked role as a general creative influence, noting especially the influence of Rousseau's La Nouvelle Héloïse on the novel, which Percy had read at the time of writing, but Mary had not. Huet also highlights several instances where Percy had replaced Mary's more plain diction with his own vocabulary, calling this "unimpeachable evidence" that Percy was—as Rieger claimed—at least a minor collaborator. She argues that Percy is responsible for the novel's themes of human procreation and sterility, and credits Percy for developing the contrast between the characters of Victor and Elizabeth, and the idea that Frankenstein should travel to England to create a female partner for his monster. Editor Duncan Wu disputes this, claiming that Mary had already established both ideas, and that Percy only suggested that the trip to England should be Victor's own idea, not his father's.

English professor Charles E. Robinson published a 2008 edition of the novel entitled The Original Frankenstein, which thoroughly documents Percy Shelley's additions and changes to Mary's original manuscript. This edition listed the author as "Mary Shelley (with Percy Shelley)", causing widespread media comment and discussion. In The Neglected Shelley, Robinson examined Percy's allegedly significant contributions to the novel in greater detail.

A 2022 stylometric analysis compared Frankenstein to the undisputed novels of Mary and Percy Shelley, and found significant evidence against the claim that Percy Shelley played a large role in the authorship of the novel, and in favour of Mary's overall authorship.
