= Spaceship Zero =

- Spaceship Zero artwork by Chris Woods. The artwork appears on both The Darkest of the Hillside Thickets album of the same name and the cover of the roleplaying game.
- Designers: Toren Atkinson, Warren Banks
- Publishers: Green Ronin Publishing
- Publication: 2002
- Genres: Science fiction, Parody
- Systems: Custom (though derived from the Basic Role-Playing system)

Spaceship Zero is the title of a media franchise that includes a role-playing game and an indie rock CD.

== Role-playing Game ==
The role-playing game was written by Warren Banks and Toren Atkinson, with contributions from John Scott Tynes, Monte Cook, and Andrew J Lucas. It was published by Green Ronin Publishing in 2002.

The game is a spoof and homage to 1950s and 1960s science fiction adventure television, such as Lost in Space. The game won the 2003 ENnie silver award for Best Non-Open-Gaming Product.

=== Game mechanics ===
The game mechanics are heavily rooted in the Basic Role-Playing system, including a rules system that is percentile-based. But creator Toren Atkinson noted the mechanic is based "on an old homemade game system of mine from the 80’s". The dice mechanic when performing skills is to roll as high as possible without going over your skill value. The system also brings in the concept of zero dice, which act similar to hero/fate/drama points from other role-playing game systems.

=== Setting ===
The following quote is an accurate summation of the setting.

"The year is 2025. Earth spacecraft routinely crisscross the solar system, but leaving its confines has remained impossible until now. A scientist in the employ of SpaceCorp, a firm recently in dire financial straits, has invented the Better-Than-Light (BTL) Drive. If successful, it will usher mankind into an age of interstellar travel and SpaceCorp back into the black. The drive will be tested on a spacecraft designated Spaceship Zero, a Space Hopper Mark V stripped of weapons to accommodate the BTL Drive and the generator for the Bendall Field that protects the craft from the extreme gravity the BTL Drive creates. Presumably, most or all of the PCs are members of the Zero's crew.

"Regrettably, when the BTL drive is activated, it doesn't move the Zero at better-than-light speeds as advertised. Instead, it gives the ship infinite mass, creating a gravity well that destroys the entire universe and making the ship ground zero (pardon the pun) for a new Big Bang.

"Once the crew is through freaking out, they decide to use the Deconstitutor – the setting's equivalent of hypersleep, which works by reducing people into their essential salts (sound familiar, Lovecraft fans?) for storage – and wait for the new universe to re-evolve into what should, theoretically, be a carbon copy of the original.

"Well, like the BTL Drive, it was a nice theory."

Thirteen billion years later the crew is reconstituted, they hope that Universe 2 has evolved in exactly the same way that the Universe 1 they destroyed had. It mostly did, except for a few small differences, most notably a race of alien conquerors ravaging the solar system.

There are also a large number of Lovecraft and Cthulhu references throughout the setting and game manual.

=== Supplements ===
There are currently three published adventures for the Spaceship Zero roleplaying game. All are written by at least Toren Atkinson with others credited as noted. All follow an ongoing linear story arc. The titles of the three adventures are:

- Asteroid X (Toren Atkinson, Evan Sass, Rick Achberger, Matt Wiseman) Adventure Maps
- Slave Ship of Despair. (Toren Atkinson, Warren Banks, Andrew J. Lucas, and Brian "Chainsaw" Campbell)
- The Strange Secret of Dr. Quisling. Inspired by a concept by Bob Wilkins

== CD ==
An album by The Darkest of the Hillside Thickets was released a year before the role-playing game hit retail shelves. The original intention was to have both RPG and CD release within a similar timeframe, but the logistics of writing both an album and a role-playing game, trying to coincide their releases, proved to be problematic. The band was touring Canada, promoting the Spaceship Zero album while they were finishing up the final drafts of the role-playing game manuscript. The CD liner notes include a short story about Spaceship Zero and the crew.

== Radio Play ==
In 2016, several "restored" episodes of the 1954 American radio dramas were released to the internet. Episodes include "Chapter One: The Crew Assembles," "Chapter Two: Into the Beyond," "Chapter Three: The Cataclysmic Miscalculation," "Chapter Four: Directive Beta Five," "Chapter Six: Escape From the Hydronauts," and "Chapter Nine: Twenty Minutes of Oxygen." The missing episodes were allegedly lost in a studio fire in 1962.

== Comic Book ==
A short Spaceship Zero comic book story appeared in the graphic novel anthology Exploded View by Vancouver's Cloudscape Comics in 2010. It is based on the ongoing series of adventures already released (Asteroid X, Slave Ship of Despair, and The Strange Secret of Dr. Quisling) and is intended to be a prequel to that story arc. .

== Video ==
In summer 2010 the band filmed footage using a space suit and various props on location in the sand dunes of Richmond BC and a space ship set left over from the TV show Defying Gravity. The footage was cut into a video for their song "20 Minutes of Oxygen" and as a trailer for the film, and premiered at the event Cthulhupalooza II: Son of Cthulhupalooza in February 2011 in Vancouver.

== Marketing ==
To enhance the ideas of the setting, the developers have based the game on a number of false documents, namely by referencing the game to television shows, radio plays, and films which did not and do not exist.

As the book explains, the game is based on a 1950s German radio play (Raumschiff Null being a direct translation of "Spaceship Zero"). The German radio play was based on a 1930s American moviehouse serial called Spaceship to the Stars (which eventually became an American television show in the 1950s). The German radio play eventually spawned a German television show (of the same name) that aired from 1978 to 1980. And all this has spawned an American film production. The game plays off the ruse in a variety of ways. For instance, a section of the book is devoted to episode summaries from the "old television series". And fake websites, hosted by the games' authors, detail the film's production. The marketing of the CD is similar - being referred to and played-up as a soundtrack.

The hoax has been readily accepted in a number of reviews for the title.

However, there neither is nor was any related film or plan to make one. This was, again, part of the elaborate ruse that played further into the premise of the roleplaying game. Atkinson confirmed in an interview that "There was never a Spaceship Zero movie, nor was there a TV show or radio serial upon which that movie was based.".
