= Steven Savile =

British writer (born 1969)

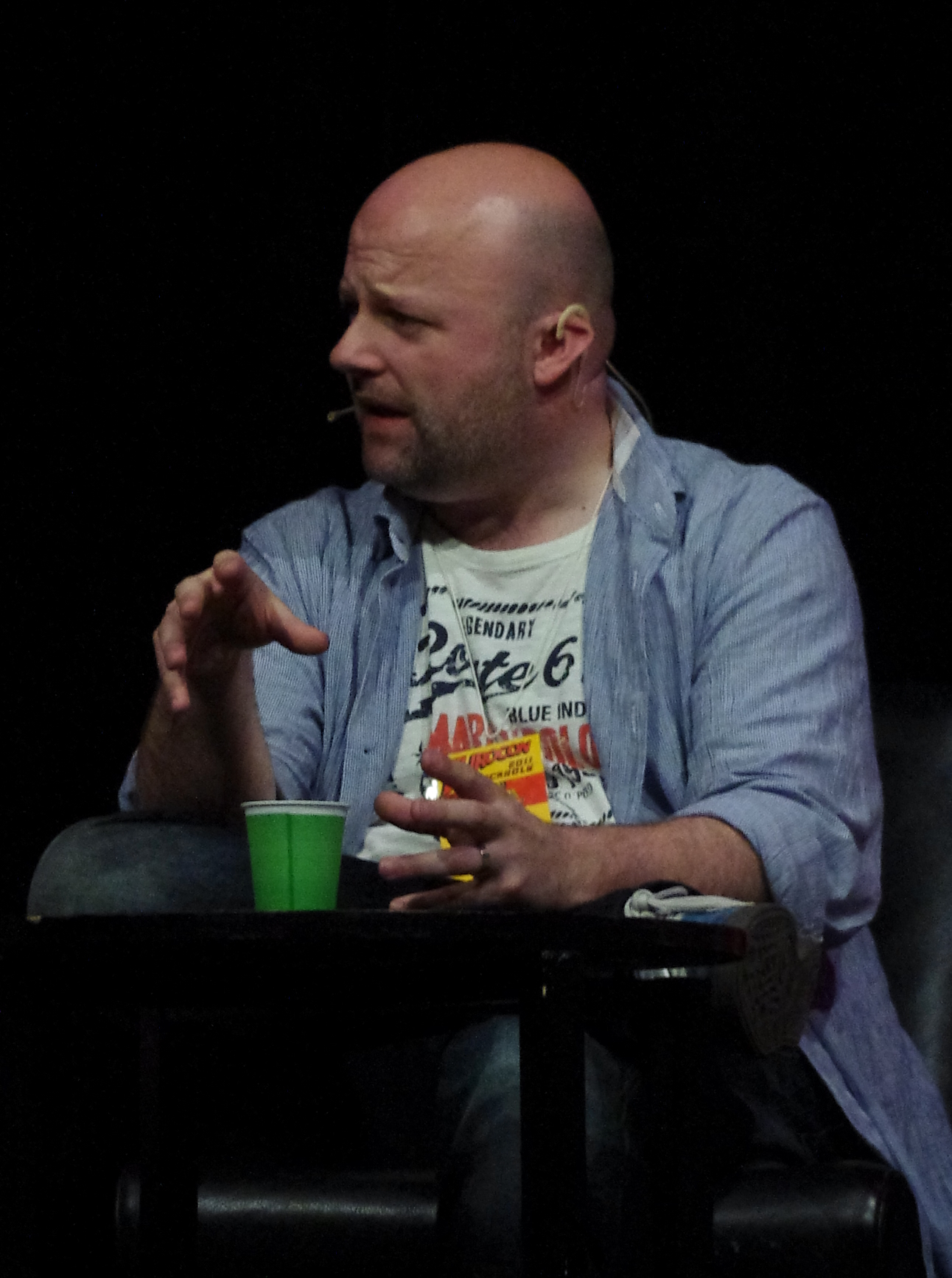
- Savile at Eurocon 2011
- Born: 12 October 1969 (age 56) Newcastle, England
- Occupation: Writer, editor
- Period: 1999–present
- Genre: Fantasy, Horror

Website
- stevensavile.com

Steven Savile (born 12 October 1969) is a British fantasy, horror and thriller writer and editor living in Sweden. His published work includes novels and numerous short stories in magazines and anthologies.

== Career ==
Steven Savile started out writing and reviewing play-by-mail games in the UK in the late 1980s, then launched his own company, Pheonix Games (intentionally misspelled), before working for Games Workshop. He has written several novels, including Inheritance, Dominion, and Retribution, all set in the Warhammer world, as well as fiction connected to Slaine, Dr. Who, and Torchwood.

Savile has primarily made his name working in established franchises such as Star Wars, Stargate, Jurassic Park: The Lost World, Fireborn, Risen, Warhammer and Pathfinder. He's also written a number of Top Trumps facts books for kids including Dinosaurs, Creatures of the Deep, and Predators among others. He has also written a number of original novels, including the Ogmios team series which began with Silver. Savile's most successful novel to date, Silver, reached #2 on the Amazon best-seller charts and was listed by The Bookseller as one of the Top 30 best-selling digital titles of 2011.

Savile has also written and edited Doctor Who stories for Big Finish with his work featuring in The Centenarian, Snapshots, Defining Patterns, The Ghosts of Christmas and The Quality of Leadership anthologies in the Short Trips series. He also edited the anthology Destination Prague, the 20th volume in that series. To date Savile has written two Sláine novels for Black Flame, Slaine the Exile and Slaine the Defiler, and wrote the first novel tied into the universe of the British television show Primeval, for Titan Books.

Savile was a runner-up for the British Fantasy Award in 2000 and again in 2010. With his novel Primeval: Shadow of the Jaguar, Savile won the Best Young Adult Original Novel for the 2009 Scribe Awards presented by the International Association of Media Tie-In Writers. Tau Ceti, co-written with Kevin J Anderson, is a nominee for the inaugural Lifeboat Award for novels featuring inter-stellar travel.

He has edited and co-edited numerous anthologies, including Redbrick Eden, which raised money for the homeless charity Shelter and the 2006 science fiction and fantasy anthology Elemental, a benefit anthology for children who survived the 2004 Indian Ocean tsunami that includes work by Arthur C. Clarke, Brian Aldiss, David Drake, Jacqueline Carey, Martha Wells, Larry Niven, Joe Haldeman, Eric Nylund, Sherrilyn Kenyon (writing as Kinley MacGregor), Stel Pavlou, Michael Marshall Smith, Sean Williams, Nina Kiriki Hoffman, Brian Herbert & Kevin J. Anderson, and others.

In May 2013 it was announced that Savile had written a novel with hip hop legend Prodigy of Mobb Deep, H.N.I.C., to be released by Akashic in the US.

He has been published in a dozen languages and sold more than half a million copies of his novels and stories worldwide.

== Published works ==
=== Standalone novels ===
- The Secret Life of Colors (2000)
- Laughing Boy's Shadow (2003 and 2007)
- London Macabre (2012)
- Black Chalice (2011)
- Hallowed Ground (co-written with David Niall Wilson) (2011)
- Fireborn: Each Ember's Ghost (2012)
- Risen: Dark Waters (2012) (Companion novel to the videogame Risen 2: Dark Waters)
- Sign of Glaaki: An Arkham Horror Novel (co-written with Steve Lockley) (2013)
- Immortal (2014)
- Murder At Sorrow's Crown (a Sherlock Holmes novel, co-written with Robert Greenberger) (2016)
- Glass Town (2017)

=== The Ogmios Team novels ===
- Silver (2010)
- Solomon's Seal (co-written with Steve Lockley) (2012)
- WarGod (co-written with Sean Ellis) (2012)
- Lucifer's Machine (co-written with Rick Chesler) (forthcoming 2013)
- Gold (AKA 'Gold: an Ogmios Adventure')' (forthcoming 2013)
- Argo (co-written with Ashley Knight) (2017)

=== The Lay of Sláine Mac Roth ===
Novels featuring the Celtic warrior known as Sláine Mac Roth:

1. Sláine the Exile (2006)
2. Sláine the Defiler (2007)

=== Primeval related ===
Primeval TV series related novels:

- Primeval: Shadow of the Jaguar (2008)

=== Stargate SG-1 related ===
Stargate literature for the show Stargate SG-1 TV series related novels:

- Stargate SG-1: The Power Behind the Throne (forthcoming, May 2010)

=== Warhammer related ===
Books based in the Warhammer Fantasy mythos:

- Curse of the Necrarch (2008)

==== Warhammer Von Carstein Trilogy ====
1. Inheritance (2006)
2. Dominion (2006)
3. Retribution (2007)
- Vampire Wars (2008), omnibus anthology of the trilogy

=== Stellaris (video game) related ===
1. Stellaris: Infinite Frontiers (2016)

=== Torchwood related ===
Stories related to the Torchwood TV series:

- Torchwood: Hidden (2008) (audiobook original)
- Black Water appeared in the Torchwood Yearbook (2008)
- 'Gordian' parts I & II appeared in the Torchwood Magazine (2009)

=== Novellas ===
- Icarus Descending (2000)
- Houdini's Last Illusion (2004)
- Temple: Incarnations (2007)
- The Hollow Earth (2007) (A Greyfriar's Gentleman's Club Story)
- Monster Town/The Butcher of Box Hill – an Ace Double-style front-to-back novella co-written with Brian M. Logan under the pseudonym "Logan Savile" (Bad Moon Books, 2010)
- For This Is Hell (co-written with Aaron Rosenberg (2012)

=== Short stories ===
==== Collections ====
- Similar Monsters (2001)
- Angel Road (2004)
- "The Horned Man" (2013)
- "Idiot Hearts" (2013)
- "The Sally Reardon Supernatural Mysteries" (co-written with Steve Lockley) (2011)
- "King Wolf" (The Hoke Berglund stories) (2014) Fox Spirit Books

==== Doctor Who related ====
Doctor Who short stories written by Steven Savile:

- "Falling From Xi'an" – appeared in the anthology Short Trips: The Centenarian
- "The Sorrows of Vienna" – appeared in the anthology Short Trips: Snapshots
- "Loose Change" – appeared in the anthology Short Trips: Defining Patterns
- "The Stars Our Contamination" – appeared in the anthology Short Trips: The Ghosts of Christmas
- "Peaceable Kingdom" – appeared in the anthology Short Trips: The Quality of Leadership

==== Uncollected Short stories ====
- "The Horned Man" – appeared in the anthology Boondocks Fantasy
- "London on the Brink of Never" – appeared in the anthology Spells of the City
- "Dear Prudence" – appeared in the anthology Blood Lite
- "Mens Rea" – appeared in the anthology Aegri Somnia
- "Ghosts of Love" – first appeared in the anthology Touched By Wonder (A Thera Story) – reprinted in Worlds of Their Own, edited by James Lowder
- "Night of Falling Stars" – appeared in Orson Scott Card's InterGalactic Medicine Show (A Thera Story)
- "The Song Her Heart Sang" – appeared in the anthology The Solaris Book of New Fantasy (A Thera Story)
- "Idiot Hearts" – appeared in the anthology Poe's Progeny
- "A Madness of Ravens" – appeared in the anthology Daikaiju!3 (A Greyfriar's Gentleman's Club Story)
- "Lies of the Flesh" – appeared in the anthology Invasion!, a Warhammer Fantasy anthology
- "Death's Cold Kiss" – appeared in the anthology The Cold Hand of Betrayal
- "The Angel with the Sad Eyes" – appeared in the anthology Eulogies
- "Absence of Divinity" – appeared in the anthology Vivisections
- "Memories in Glass" – appeared in the anthology The Asylum

=== Graphic novels ===
- The Fragrance of You (2005)

=== Non-fiction ===
- Fantastic TV: 50 Years of Cult Fantasy and Science Fiction (2010) (non-fiction: essays on contemporary genre television)

=== As editor ===
- Redbrick Eden: Scaremongers 2 (1999)
- Elemental: The Tsunami Relief Anthology: Stories of Science Fiction and Fantasy (2006) (co-edited with Alethea Kontis)
- Black Gondolier and Other Stories (2003) The Collected Horror Stories of Fritz Leiber part one (co-edited with John Pelan)
- Smoke Ghost and Other Apparitions (2004) The Collected Horror Stories of Fritz Leiber part two (co-edited with John Pelan)
- Short Trips: Destination Prague (2007) Doctor Who Short Trips Volume 20

Notably Savile also wrote the storyline for the first-person single-player campaign mode on the popular computer game Battlefield 3, though the video cut scenes and in game material was written by other writers.
