= Murder At Sorrow's Crown =

2016 novel by Steven Savile and Robert Greenberger

- Author: Steven Savile and Robert Greenberger
- Language: English
- Genre: Mystery
- Published: September 13, 2016 (Titan Books)
- Publication place: United Kingdom
- Media type: Novel
- Pages: 320
- ISBN: 978-1-78329-512-8 (first edition)

Murder At Sorrow's Crown is a mystery pastiche novel written by Steven Savile and Robert Greenberger, featuring Sherlock Holmes and Dr. John Watson, set shortly after the First Boer War.

Titan Books published the book in 2016, as part of its Further Adventures series, which collects a number of noted Holmesian pastiches, as well as original material.

== Plot ==
July 1881: a mother comes to Sherlock Holmes to find her son. A naval officer posted to HMS Dido to fight the Boers. However, he did not return with his men, and is now being denounced as a deserter and traitor. Can Holmes uncover the truth, a truth that threatens the Empire with assassination, diamond mines and military cover-ups?

== See also ==
- Sherlock Holmes pastiches
