= Coming Full Circle =

Tabletop horror role-playing game supplement

- Cover by Heather Hudson
- Designers: John H. Crowe III
- Publishers: Pagan Publishing
- Publication: 1995; 30 years ago
- Genres: Fantasy
- Systems: Basic Role-Playing
- ISBN: 1887797009

Coming Full Circle is a 1995 role-playing game adventure for Call of Cthulhu published by Pagan Publishing.

== Contents ==
Coming Full Circle is a set of four adventures that are loosely connected and take place over a span of ten years, and are not connected to the Cthulhu Mythos scenarios.

== Reception ==
Paul Pettengale reviewed Coming Full Circle for Arcane magazine, rating it a 6 out of 10 overall. Pettengale comments that "While the author's ability to weave an involving tale without recourse to Mythos is clever, the campaign ultimately suffers: regular players will be looking for a Mythos source to the mysteries in which they are embroiled, and frustration is a danger."
