= List of Primeval books and novelisations =

This is a list of books and novelisations for the ITV science fiction drama series Primeval.

== Novels for 12+ ==
These books are novelisations of episodes, published by Puffin Books in paperback.

#	Title	Author	Publisher	Released	ISBN	Episodes based on
1	A Rip in Time	Kay Woodward	Puffin Books	27 March 2008	13: 978-0141323916	1.1 and 1.2
2	Dangerous Dimension	Pippa Le Quesne	Puffin Books	27 March 2008	13: 978-0141323923	1.3 and 1.4
3	The Lost Predator	Alicia Brodersen	Puffin Books	27 March 2008	13: 978-0141323930	1.5 and 1.6
4	Fight for Survival	Alicia Brodersen	Puffin Books	27 March 2008	13: 978-0141323947	2.1, 2.2 and 2.3

== Novels for 14+ ==
Four original novels, not novelisations of broadcast episodes, have been published by Titan Books. The first is Shadow of the Jaguar by Steven Savile, which revealed that anomalies do appear overseas. The second novel, written by acclaimed fantasy writer Paul Kearney, is entitled The Lost Island. The third, Extinction Event is by Dan Abnett who has also written "Torchwood" and "Doctor Who" books. The fourth and thus far final novel, entitled Fire and Water, is by Simon Guerrier and features Danny Quinn as lead character.

#	Title	Author	Publisher	Released	ISBN	Set between	Plot Summary
1	Shadow of the Jaguar	Steven Savile	Titan Books	21 March 2008	ISBN 978-1-84576-692-4	Episodes 2.3 & 2.4	A delirious backpacker crawls out of the dense Peruvian jungle, muttering about the impossible things that he has seen... A local ranger reports seeing animal tracks and bones - fresh bones - that he cannot explain... Cutter and the team are plunged into the hostile environment of the Peruvian rainforest, where they then must endure a perilous journey leading them to a confrontation with something more terrifying than they could ever have possible imagined...
2	The Lost Island	Paul Kearney	Titan Books	24 October 2008	ISBN 978-1-84576-694-8	Episodes 2.3 & 2.4	A trawler is torn to pieces by an enormous sea monster, off the Irish coast. Meanwhile, Connor's anomaly detector goes off the charts: Half a dozen rifts in time have appeared, all on one deserted - yet politically contentious - island... While Lester struggles to hold on to his career, as the story edges ever closer, to the front page, Cutter and his team must battle through a deadly storm, to reach the island, only to find themselves fighting to survive, amidst the terrifying creatures, roaming the harsh landscape...
3	Extinction Event	Dan Abnett	Titan Books	23 January 2009	ISBN 978-1-84576-693-1	Episodes 2.7 & 3.1	When an Entelodon goes on the rampage down Oxford Street, causing untold damage and loss of life, Cutter decides that a new approach to tackling the anomalies is needed. However, his investigations then expose him and the team to a violent encounter with a mysterious Russian scientist, and a situation more catastrophic and frightening than they have ever faced, before... When Cutter, Abby, and Connor disappear without a trace, Lester and Jenny must use every trick in the book to try to track them down...
4	Fire and Water	Simon Guerrier	Titan Books	27 April 2009	ISBN 978-1-84576-695-5	Episodes 3.5 & 3.6	At a safari park in South Africa, rangers are inexplicably disappearing, and strange creatures have been seen battling with lions and hippopotamuses. As the team investigates, they are drawn into a dark conspiracy, which could have dire consequences. Meanwhile, back in London, Connor, Abby, and Sarah are left to cope on their own. As torrential rain pours down over the city, and enormous anomaly opens up in East London...

== Primeval: New World Novels ==
These books are based on the show Primeval: New World

#	Title	Author	Publisher	Released	ISBN	Episodes based on
1	The Ascent	Julian Michael Carver	Primal Publishing	TBA	13:TBA	Between 1.1 and 1.2

== Activity books ==
Ladybird Books has published two sticker books (one of which is a glow in the dark sticker book) a poster book, a tattoo activity title, a wipe-clean activity book, and a summer annual for children from five to eight years old.

#	Title	Publisher	Released	ISBN
1	Primeval: Sticker Collection	E-Max	November 2007	TBA
2	Primeval: Stats & Facts Poster Book	Ladybird Books	November 2007	ISBN 1-84646-806-X
3	Primeval: Anomaly Activity Book	Ladybird Books	November 2007	ISBN 1-84646-807-8
4	Primeval: Activity Annual	Ladybird Books	March 2008	ISBN 1-84646-894-9
5	Primeval: Funfax	Dorling Kindersley	March 2008	ISBN 1-4053-2919-X
6	Primeval: Glow in the Dark Sticker Book	Ladybird Books	March 2008	ISBN 1-84646-871-X
7	Primeval: Tattoo Activity Book	Ladybird Books	October 2008	ISBN 1-84646-872-8
8	Primeval: Monster Wipe-out Games Book	Ladybird Books	October 2008	ISBN 1-84646-972-4
9	Primeval: Midnight Terror Trail Activity Book	Ladybird Books	March 2009	ISBN 1-4093-0237-7
10	Primeval: Brain Twisters Sticker Book	Ladybird Books	March 2009	ISBN 1-4093-0236-9

== See also ==
- List of television series made into books
