= The Hills Rise Wild! =

Board game

The Hills Rise Wild! is a 2000 board game published by Pagan Publishing.

== Gameplay ==
The Hills Rise Wild! is a game with misfit families of Lovecraftian fast-paced miniatures. They battle with dice and special powers to claim the Necronomicon.

== Reception ==
The Hills Rise Wild! won the Origins Award for "Best Graphic Presentation of a Board Game 2000".

== Reviews ==
- Pyramid
- Polyhedron #146
- Syfy
