= Three Days to Kill (Atlas Games) =

Role-playing game adventure

Three Days to Kill is a 2000 role-playing game adventure published by Atlas Games.

== Plot summary ==
Three Days to Kill is an adventure in which the player characters launch a three‑day commando strike to disrupt a bandit lord's dark alliance.

== Publication history ==
Three companies started d20 System publishing off on August 10, 2000, by releasing their adventures the same day: The Wizard's Amulet (2000) from Necromancer Games, often described as the first d20 product as the PDF was published in the few minutes of August 10 and was the first d20 supplement in wide release); Three Days to Kill (2000) from Atlas Games was available for sale locally a week before the convention but only officially went on sale that year at Gen Con which made it the first d20 supplement in print; and Death in Freeport (2000) was available a few hours later at Gen Con.

== Reviews ==
- Pyramid
- Polyhedron #144
- Campaign Magazine #1 (Aug./Sept., 2001)
- Legions Realm Monthly (Issue 13 - Oct 2003)
- Realms of Fantasy
