= Comics Scene =

Defunct magazine

- Categories: Comic Books
- Frequency: Bi-monthly/monthly
- First issue: January 1982
- Final issue: 2000
- Company: Starlog Group
- Country: United States

Comics Scene was a magazine published in three volumes by Starlog Group Inc. Its original 11-issue run lasted from January 1982 through September 1983 and the second volume was published between 1987 and early 1996, lasting 56 issues (this second series was published from bi-monthly at its initial start, to monthly frequency for its final years). The third volume, also known as Comics Scene 2000, was published in 2000 for three bi-monthly issues.

The primary focus of the magazine was coverage of the adaptation of various comic book properties into movies and television shows, but it also occasionally carried articles about the comic book industry itself.

Comics Scene was, like its sister magazines Starlog and Fangoria, distributed via the newsstand system and was widely available in drug stores and grocery outlets.
