= Midnight (Dungeons & Dragons) =

Tabletop role-playing game campaign setting

Midnight is a campaign setting for the Dungeons & Dragons role-playing game, released under the Open Gaming License. It was published by Fantasy Flight Games from 2003 to 2009.

== History ==
Midnight was published in 2003 and received over a dozen supplements from 2003 to 2007. The Midnight Campaign setting book (MN01) was first released in 2003. It proved popular enough to drive the release of several expansion sourcebooks and adventure modules. The Second Edition Midnight Campaign setting book (MN11) was released in 2005; it expanded upon the material in the first book and incorporated material from the sourcebooks.

Fantasy Flight Games no longer publishes material for Midnight. The rights were passed to Edge Studios. In 2022, Edge published a new version titled Midnight: Legacy of Darkness, using the 5th Edition Dungeons & Dragons ruleset.

== Setting ==
The setting of Midnight is that of the fantasy world of Eredane, a large continent with varied geography and inhabitants, one hundred years after the dark god Izrador has won a war of domination. Eredane is generally an evil-dominant world, with the Church of the Shadow and its orc minions controlling the lives of the downtrodden humans. Elves and dwarves are hunted mercilessly, while the gnomes toil for the Shadow and halflings are often enslaved.

=== In-game history ===
An unknown time ago, there was a war in the heavens. Izrador, the god of corruption, fought the gods, turning many angels into devils and demons. He lost the war, so the gods punished him by banishing him to Eredane for all eternity. Izrador's fall created the Veil of Izrador, a barrier that prevented the other gods from influencing the land.

When Izrador fell to earth, his first thought was of reaching godhood again. His plan to do that was to make all humans, elves and dwarves give him their magic. Izrador has since taken over the land, so now there is no magic in Eredane but his own, and Izrador has become "The Shadow".

Long before Izrador's fall, in the First Age of Eredane, a sorceress named Aradil came to the elven throne. She brought peace to her people and this peace spread across the land, creating a new age of peace and trade in magic and science, until it seemed that magic would have no bounds. There were no disputes between cultures, and customs were passed along. But after four thousand years, a new race came from an unknown land. The gnomes and halflings opened their arms to this new people, a human race called the Dorns, who had lost their land across the sea due to the betrayal of King Jahir III. Hoping to claim land for themselves, they slaughtered all they found and wiped out most of those who had wished to help them. War had arrived.

The Dorns quickly attacked the elves and dwarves. As these races were used only to fighting undisciplined orcs, they were quickly outmatched by the war-hardened Dorns. But the elves and dwarves developed their tactics until the sides were even. The ensuing war tore Eredane apart for 300 years.

After this time, the dead began to rise. The souls of the dead had no place to go, so they lingered and animated their corpses, becoming the "Fell", hungry for flesh. Many times, after a battle, the dead would rise, and both sides would drop their weapons and flee these abominations. After a few years of fighting these creatures, their resources spent, the races of Eredane adopted a new method of burying their dead and the rising of corpses was slowed to a trickle. The land looked to a new age of peace, science, and magic as the war ended.

For 700 years, trade routes reopened and the Dorns came to be trusted again. But the Shadow massed an army of orcs, goblins, and countless other things. The Shadow knew that the elves were its greatest foe, so it attempted to destroy them quickly, but to no avail. For five days, the races of Eredane fought, until the rivers ran red with blood and the forest groves turned to swamps with the blood of the orcs. And so the Shadow was finally driven back to the North.

This was the dawn of the Second Age of Eredane, which began with 230 years of peace, growing economies and widening frontiers. A wall was built to face the North so that the Shadow would not come again. But a new threat appeared instead: the dominating Sarcosans, with their steel and horses, which had not been seen until then. The Sarcosans had driven the Dorns out of the far-distant land of Pelluria and wished to take this new land for their own. The Sarcosans liked the elven forest of Aryth, and tried to conquer it. They came with catapults and attempted to destroy groves and draw out the elves to fight, but the elves placed wards around the trees and protected them. It took the Sarcosans one hundred years to realize that the elves would not be drawn from the trees, and they finally sued for peace. And then again came a period of 800 years of peace, the longest such period since the Dornish invasions more than 3,000 years before. The Shadow then came again to Eredane.

The Second Invasion of the Shadow consisted of a series of raids on the wall, which was breached in a number of places. The Shadow's army poured out again, attacking in many places at once, to split the races' energies. Worse still, the dragons of Eredane aided the Shadow. For many weeks, the battles raged, with the Fell rising every night. All seemed lost for the people of Eredane, when a new army of dragons came from the south and fought the forces of the Shadow. When the battle was over, both sides had suffered greatly. The orcs were scattered, and the people of Eredane had lost all of their faith. They quietly returned to their homes again, thus ending the Second Age, and beginning the Third Age.

A thousand years passed, and it was still no better. The Dorns fought over the new kings, for the rest had been slain. The dwarves were forced into the mountains by some still-resilient orcs, and were confined there. The elves knew the Shadow would come again, but the shorter-lived races had lost their memory of the great battles. In the end, all the races but the elves and dwarves were reduced to tribes.

When the Shadow came again, he did not send a huge army, but he corrupted the minds of men. He promised men wealth and power in exchange for black promises of vengeance and death. There was a battle that lasted a day and only briefly delayed the Shadow. Now, there is no freedom, and any relations with dwarves or elves is punishable by death. In the land of Eredane, there are no trials or appeals. Punishment includes the whip, enslavement, or death, and is carried out brutally and with no mercy.

=== Orcs ===
The Odrendor, commonly called Orcs, are a fey race that serve Izrador loyally as fighters. They are large, muscled humanoid creatures with black eyes, thick dark skin, and large jaws sporting tusked canines. They have been known to sire halfbreed children, called "Dworgs", with dwarven women. These unfortunate outcasts suffer a life of scorn and violence.

=== Shadow Church ===
The Church of the Shadow worships the god Izrador. Thrown down from the celestial kingdom, he has cast his veil of evil and corruption across Aryth, sundering the world from all other gods. The various Orders of Legates hunt those who resist his power, aided by intelligent beasts who can sense magic and disloyalty to Izrador. A legate enjoys a greater quality of life than the average human, but must serve under strict rules for life: those who go "Pale" and flee their vows are hunted and captured by "Redeemer" legates. The Church prohibits literacy, use of magic, and the ownership of weapons by anyone not authorized by the Church. Legates and their minions punish infractions of these rules with maiming, enslavement, or death.

=== Black Mirrors ===
Black Mirrors are slabs of obsidian that leach magic from the land. They require sacrifice, more blood for the higher-ranking Mirrors. The Mirrors are rated as Pale Mirrors (which require five sacrifices a month), Blood Mirrors (five a week), and Grand Mirrors (five a day). In the Shadow's language, they are called zordrafin corith, or Black Mirrors of the Shadow. They have stone basins next to them that are at least ten feet in diameter and three feet deep, and filled with a vile recipe of blood and unholy water.

=== Night Kings ===
The four Night Kings were once two humans, an elf, and a dragon. Ardherin, the elf, was once a powerful spellcaster. Extraordinarily arrogant, he seized what he believed was a minor demon. He hoped to force this demon to teach him arcane knowledge that would allow him to defeat the Shadow. In fact, this demon was Izrador in disguise. It slowly corrupted Ardherin's mind until he was too weak to resist. At that point, Izrador took him for his own, forever trapping the once beautiful elf prince in an eternal world of torment and shame.

One of the humans was a priest that always wanted a god's blessing; his name was Sunulael. Over weeks and months, the Shadow took his mind by slowly convincing him through dreams that the Shadow was truly a god and wished Sunulael to serve him. At last, Sunulael agreed and was corrupted. The dragon and the other human were captured and brainwashed.

=== Spirits ===
As the world became covered with the magical "Veil of Izrador", the planes of the afterlife were blocked from Aryth. The spirits of the dead can no longer depart in peace. At times, they become attached to the recent dead, and walk the land as "Fell", corpses that have returned from the grave. Having no place for their souls to go, their souls stayed inside of their bodies, hungry for flesh.

== Rules ==
Based on the Dungeons & Dragons rules, and using the Player's Handbook as a basis, Midnight alters the standard rules in some fundamental ways. Magic is more difficult to cast and harder to learn, the magic system has been replaced with a feat-and-spell-point-based system. As a result, many of the standard classes have been removed, with alternates in their place.

=== Heroic paths ===
One major factor that separates the Midnight d20 game system from other fantasy games is the choice of a heroic path during character creation. Since magic is proscribed, these paths instead give spell-like abilities to characters. As the characters advance in levels, they get new spell-like abilities, skills, or feats.

=== Magic ===
Three types of magic are found in the Midnight d20 world: "divine", which generally is connected with Izrador; innate magic sourced from within, generally found in elves and other fey creatures; and channelled. The latter uses the energy of Aryth to powerful effect. This is a feat-based system, and thus all character classes can cast some spells at appropriate levels. Only the Channeler character class truly specializes in it, however. Due to the magic changes in the game, Midnight does not have the monk, ranger, or paladin character classes.

=== Magic items ===
Midnight is different from other D&D settings in that magic items (+1 weapons, for example) are markedly less common, with all magic in the world tracked and watched. Magic items function as they do in other settings but the meaning and rarity are different. There are two magic item types: Covenant Items and Charms.

Covenant Items equate to standard D&D magic items. However, they differ in that they "grow" with the user. Only those with the touch of Heroic Path can activate their power, and this power grows as the user increases in level. Items come in all the standard D&D forms (e.g. weapons, armor, cloaks). Items may be detected by Legates and the Shadow when they are activated. There are Covenant Items spanning from the First Age through to current game time, with older items being of greater power. PCs will tend to get only two or three covenant items at any one time, with these "destined" for the PC's use.

Charms are magic items of lesser power. All but True Charms are single use, with True Charms lasting longer but usually fading over time. Charms usually have small bonuses and are not detectable by the enemy; they are only empowered items and trinkets. Characters may have several charms at any given time.

== Appearance in other media ==
Fantasy Flight Games released a Runebound: Midnight board game in 2006.

In April 2006, Fantasy Flight Games started a division for media production and released The Midnight Chronicles film on DVD in 2008 along with a role-playing game adventure for Dungeons & Dragons 4th Edition. This live-action movie was based on the Midnight setting, and was produced with the intention of being used as the pilot for a TV series. However, it was not picked up and remains as a stand-alone movie.

== Reception ==
Shannon Appelcline noted that Midnight "was a bigger hit" than Fantasy Flight's other release of 2003, Dawnforge, and commented that it "detailed a fantasy realm that felt broadly like Middle-earth but with a single and notable change: the bad guys had won. The result was a dark and gloomy gameworld that was the best received of all of FFG's campaign releases."

Midnight won the 2003 Gold Ennie Award for "Best Campaign Setting" and the Silver Ennie Award for "Best Art, Cover".

In a review of Midnight Second Edition in Black Gate, Tom Doolan said "The history of the world is rich and well-developed. The layout is intuitive and clearly divided into sections, allowing DMs to parcel out information to players on a need to know basis. The artwork is top notch, and the overall design supports the feel of the world nicely."

== Reviews ==
- Dragon Slayer
- Backstab #45
