= The Resurrected Volume One: Grace Under Pressure =

The Resurrected Volume One: Grace Under Pressure is a 1993 role-playing adventure for Call of Cthulhu published by Pagan Publishing.

== Plot summary ==
The Resurrected Volume One: Grace Under Pressure is an adventure in which scientists uncover the island of R'lyeh.

== Publication history ==
Grace Under Pressure was first published in The Unspeakable Oath. Shannon Appelcline discussed adventures from the magazine: "The adventures - such as The Unspekable Oath #2's 'Grace Under Pressure', by Tynes and Barber - got some good attention", and that "Pagan adventures often made good use of sound effects and other props - which Pagan was able to show off when running their games at cons. For 'Grace Under Pressure', for example, they suggested using three tape decks during the adventure, one containing whale songs, another containing SONAR pings and a third containing specific radio communication."

== Reception ==
Grace Under Pressure was reviewed in White Wolf #42 (April, 1994), rating it a 4 out of 5 and stated that "Bonuses are notes on the Wallaby's crew, news skills and how they are to be applied and handouts. Sections on Duel Keeper play and live action roleplaying are included, making this a value indeed."

== Reviews ==
- Shadis #10
