= Blue Planet (role-playing game) =

Tabletop science fiction role-playing game

- The cover of Blue Planet 1st version
- Designers: Jeff Barber, Greg Benage, Jim Heivilin, and Jason Werner
- Publishers: Biohazard Games (BPv1); Fantasy Flight Games (BPv2); RedBrick (BPv2); FASA Games (BPR)
- Publication: 1997 (BPv1); 2000 (BPv2); 2012 (BPR); 2025 (BPv3)
- Genres: Science fiction
- Systems: Custom (BPv1); Custom "Synergy Game System" (BPv2); Custom "Synergy Game System Revised" (BPR)

Blue Planet is an environmentalist science fiction role-playing game first published by Biohazard Games in 1997, set on the planet Poseidon.

== Setting ==
Blue Planet is set on the alien water world Poseidon, where human colonists fleeing an irreparably damaged Earth, Terran megacorporations looking for a rare ore and the indigenous aliens who live in the extensive oceans clash over how to use and steward the planet's resources.

The game includes genetically "uplifted" dolphins and orcas as playable characters on either side of the native/Terran dichotomy.

== First edition (BPv1): Biohazard Games ==
The first edition (BPv1), a 348-page book dedicated to Jacques Cousteau, was demonstrated and released at Origins in 1997 to critical acclaim, receiving a nomination for the Game of the Year Origins award. Approximately 250 of the 348 pages of the rulebook are dedicated to background about the planet Poseidon.

The first edition uses a complex percentile (d100) system to resolve combat that involves the use of hit locations.

=== Reception ===
The reviewer from Pyramid #30 (March/April, 1998) stated that "When I first picked up a copy of Blue Planet, I was mesmerized by the cover. It has the same strange and soothing attraction of looking into a fishbowl. To my delight, the cover art accurately represents the beauty and depth of the world inside."

In the August 1998 edition of Dragon (Issue 250), Ray Winninger was impressed by the body of research behind this game. However, despite all of the detail, Winninger noted that "Conspicuously absent among all the background material is solid advice on how to create and run adventures... it would have been nice to get some of the designers' thoughts on how to use all that comprehensive background information as a backdrop for satisfying stories." He concluded with a guarded recommendation: "Blue Planet's setting is one of the most creative and unusual in recent memory. The rulebook houses enough detailed material to keep an enterprising GM going for months. The rules, however, are a bit too complex and scant for the tastes of many players."

== Second edition (BPv2): Fantasy Flight Games ==
A second edition of the game (BPv2) was published in 2000 by Fantasy Flight Games as a series of several books. In addition to the Player's Guide and Moderator's Guide, there were five supplements: Fluid Mechanics, First Colony, Frontier Justice, Natural Selection, and Ancient Echoes. This edition uses a new role-playing game system called the Synergy Game System that streamlined and simplified the complex combat system of the first edition. Instead of percentile dice, the second edition uses one to three 10-sided dice, a new initiative system, and abstract armor and damage modeling.

In 2002, Steve Jackson Games produced a GURPS version of Blue Planet under license from Fantasy Flight Games.

FASA Games published a revised second edition known as Blue Planet Revised (BPR) in 2012. The revised edition consisted of two core books, the Player's Guide and the Game Master's Guide, which streamlined the second edition rules and added material originally published in the Fluid Mechanics and Natural Selection supplements. These were followed by a revised Ancient Echoes supplement in 2013.

== Recontact - Third Edition (BPv3): Biohazard Games ==
In April 2021, Biohazard Games and Gallant Knight Games launched a kickstarter for Blue Planet: Recontact, the third edition of the game. The crowdfunding campaign was successful, with an estimated delivery of October 2022. The first printed books reached backers in November 2025.

== Reviews ==
- Backstab #5
- Casus Belli #109
