= The Man Who Wrote Frankenstein =

2007 book by John Lauritsen

- Cover
- Author: John Lauritsen
- Language: English
- Subjects: Percy Bysshe Shelley; Frankenstein
- Publisher: Pagan Press
- Publication date: 2007
- Publication place: United States
- Media type: Print (Paperback)
- Pages: 229
- ISBN: 978-0-943742-14-4 (paperback); 978-0-943742-15-1 (library)

The Man Who Wrote Frankenstein is a 2007 book written and published by John Lauritsen on the Frankenstein authorship question, which promotes the fringe theory that the poet Percy Bysshe Shelley, not his wife Mary Shelley, is the real author of Frankenstein; or, The Modern Prometheus (1818). The book also argues that the novel "has consistently been underrated and misinterpreted", and that its dominant theme is "male love."

== Summary ==
Lauritsen argues that Percy Bysshe Shelley, not his wife Mary Shelley, is the real author of Frankenstein (1818), that the book "has consistently been underrated and misinterpreted", and that its dominant theme is "male love" or homoeroticism. Lauritsen criticizes feminists for constructing "a Mary Shelley myth, according to which she was a major literary figure, one whose genius had been overshadowed - not only by her husband, but also by the other male Romantics: Blake, Wordsworth, Coleridge, Byron, Keats." According to Lauritsen, Percy Bysshe Shelley did not want his authorship of Frankenstein; or, The Modern Prometheus to be known to the public, and for unknown reasons decided to attribute authorship to Mary Shelley, thus helping to begin a "hoax" that has persisted up to the present. Lauritsen maintains that revisions to Frankenstein made in 1823 and 1831 weakened the work, and that while it was ostensibly Mary Shelley who revised Frankenstein into its 1831 form, it may primarily have been revised by the political philosopher William Godwin.

Lauritsen argues that handwriting alone cannot be used to determine the actual author of Frankenstein. The drafts and manuscripts are incomplete and in the final stages. Moreover, portions of the novel were dictated by Shelley as shown by several letters.

The Man Who Wrote Frankenstein includes a favorable review of Shelley's Fiction (1998) by Phyllis Zimmerman, a book in which Zimmerman argues for Percy Bysshe Shelley's authorship of Frankenstein, and a short bibliography of books and articles about Percy Bysshe Shelley and Frankenstein. Lauritsen praises poet Edmund Blunden's Shelley: A Life Story (1946), calling it the best short biography about Percy Bysshe Shelley.

== Publication history ==
The Man Who Wrote Frankenstein was first published in 2007 by Lauritsen's publishing company, Pagan Press.

== Reception ==
The Man Who Wrote Frankenstein received positive reviews from Jim Herrick in Gay Humanist Quarterly, Hubert Kennedy in The Guide, and the novelist Douglas Sadownick in The Gay & Lesbian Review Worldwide. The book was also reviewed by Richard Labonte in the San Francisco Bay Times.

Herrick commended Lauritsen for presenting a large amount of evidence, and found much of that evidence persuasive, including the difference in quality between Frankenstein and works such as Valperga and The Last Man, as well as that between the original and revised editions of Frankenstein itself, and Mary Shelley's lack of interest in the themes of Percy Bysshe Shelley's work. Herrick credited Lauritsen with carefully examining the "extra-textual evidence", and agreed with him that the fact that the original manuscript of Frankstein is in Mary Shelley's handwriting does not show that she composed the work. However, while he agreed with Lauritsen that Percy Bysshe Shelley had homoerotic feelings and deep friendships for men and that Frankenstein "contains potential homosexual relationships", he disagreed with Lauristen's view that Frankenstein was primarily written for gay men.

Kennedy wrote that Lauritsen was "unafraid to go against accepted opinion and the entrenched literary establishment" and that his work was "intriguing and very readable", based on a careful review of the relevant evidence, and a welcome contribution to literature on the subject. He endorsed Lauritsen's argument that the quality of Frankenstein is inconsistent with that of works known to have been written by Mary Shelley, suggesting that the work was not by her, and also credited Lauritsen with refuting the argument that the fact that the surviving parts of the original manuscript of Frankenstein are in Mary Shelley's handwriting shows that the work must have been composed by her. He found Lauritsen's view that the novel's theme is "male love" persuasive, and predicted that it would appeal to gay men. However, he also predicted that while Lauritsen's thesis that Percy Bysshe Shelley is the real author of Frankenstein might be accepted by readers with no vested interest in the issue, it would be "vehemently rejected out of hand" by the "literary establishment".

Sadownick wrote that Lauritsen confirmed his view that Frankenstein is a gay work in the same sense as Walt Whitman's Leaves of Grass (1855) and Oscar Wilde's "The Ballad of Reading Gaol" (1897), and offered a commendable psychological analysis, and a sensitive line-by-line reading, of the work.

The Man Who Wrote Frankenstein was praised by the critic Camille Paglia, who wrote in Salon that "Lauritsen assembles an overwhelming case that Mary Shelley, as a badly educated teenager, could not possibly have written the soaring prose of 'Frankenstein' ... and that the so-called manuscript in her hand is simply one example of the clerical work she did for many writers as a copyist." Paglia compared Lauritsen's work to that of the critic Leslie Fiedler, concluding that The Man Who Wrote Frankenstein was, "a funny, wonderful, revelatory book that I hope will inspire ambitious graduate students and young faculty to strike blows for truth in our mired profession, paralyzed by convention and fear."

The feminist Germaine Greer dismissed Lauritsen's thesis, writing in The Guardian that while he argues that Mary Shelley was not well educated enough to have written Frankenstein, his argument fails because "it is not a good, let alone a great novel and hardly merits the attention it has been given." Lauritsen replied that Frankenstein "is a radical and disturbing work, containing some of the most beautiful prose in the English language ... a profound and moving masterpiece, fully worthy of its author, Percy Bysshe Shelley." The English professor Charles E. Robinson also rejected Lauritsen's thesis, arguing that the testimony of authors such as Lord Byron, William Godwin, Claire Clairmont, Charles Clairmont, and Leigh Hunt, as well as the "nature of the manuscript evidence", showed that the work was "conceived and mainly written by Mary Shelley".

== See also ==
- Shakespeare authorship question

== Bibliography ==
=== Books ===
- Lauritsen, John (2007). The Man Who Wrote Frankenstein. New York: Pagan Press. ISBN 978-0-943742-14-4.
- Robinson, Charles E. (2008). "Introduction". In Robinson, Charles E. (ed.). The Original Frankenstein. New York: Vintage Books. ISBN 978-0-307-47442-1.

=== Journals ===
- Sadownick, Douglas (2007). "The Man Who Loved Frankenstein". The Gay & Lesbian Review Worldwide. 14 (6).

=== Newspapers ===
- Kennedy, Hubert (August 2007). "Frankenstein: Gay Hero?". The Guide. – via EBSCO's Academic Search Complete (subscription required)
- Labonte, Richard (April 2007). "The Man Who Wrote Frankenstein". San Francisco Bay Times. – via EBSCO's Academic Search Complete (subscription required)

=== Online articles ===
- Greer, Germaine (9 April 2007). "Yes, Frankenstein really was written by Mary Shelley. It's obvious - because the book is so bad". The Guardian.
- Herrick, John (Spring 2007). "Review of The Man Who Wrote Frankenstein". Gay Humanist Quarterly.
- Lauritsen, John (12 April 2007a). "Reply to Germaine Greer". The Guardian.
- Paglia, Camille (14 March 2007). "Hillary vs. Obama". Salon. Archived from the original on 20 July 2012.
