= Marie-Hélène Huet =

French literary scholar (born 1944)

- Born: France
- Occupation: Literary scholar
- Awards: Guggenheim Fellowship (1987)

Academic background
- Education: University of Bordeaux

Academic work
- Discipline: French literature
- Institutions: University of California, Berkeley; Amherst College; Princeton University

Marie-Hélène Jacqueline Huet is a French literary scholar. A 1987 Guggenheim Fellow, she has written several books - including Rehearsing the Revolution: The Staging of Marat’s Death, 1793-1797 (1982), Monstrous Imagination (1993), Mourning Glory: The Will of the French Revolution (1997), and The Culture of Disaster (2012) - as well as a few critical editions of Jules Verne novels. She was a professor at the University of California, Berkeley, Amherst College, and Princeton University, the last of where she was M. Taylor Pyne Professor of French and Italian.

== Biography ==
Born in France, Marie-Hélène Jacqueline Huet studied at the University of Bordeaux, where she obtained her licence ès lettres in 1964 and her doctorat de troisième cycle in 1968.

In 1968, Huet joined the University of California, Berkeley, starting as an assistant professor. She was promoted to associate professor in 1974 and full professor in 1979. In 1985, she moved to Amherst College and, in addition to retaining her full professor position, became their chair of the Department of Romance Languages. She then moved to Princeton University, where she was eventually promoted to M. Taylor Pyne Professor of French and Italian. She also worked at the Folger Shakespeare Library as a seminar director.

Huet specializes in such fields as the Age of Enlightenment, particularly how it intersects with culture and science, as well as science fiction. She is author of the books Les Héros et Son Double, Essai sur le Roman d'Ascension Sociale au XVIIIe Siècle (1975), Rehearsing the Revolution, The Staging of Marat’s Death (1982), Monstrous Imagination (1993), Mourning Glory, The Will of the French Revolution (1997), and The Culture of Disaster (2012). She has also written about the work of Jules Verne, including the book L'Histoire des Voyages Extraordinaires: Essai sur l'Oeuvre de Jules Verne (1973) and five of the Bibliothèque de la Pléiade's editions of his novels. In 1987, she was awarded a Guggenheim Fellowship "for a study of monstrosity and imagination in the creative process". Monstrous Imagination won the American Comparative Literature Association's 1995 Harry Levin Prize.

In May 2010, Huet was awarded Officier of the Ordre des Palmes Académiques at the Consulate General of France, New York City.

== Works ==
- L'Histoire des Voyages Extraordinaires: Essai sur l'Oeuvre de Jules Verne (1973)
- Les Héros et Son Double: Essai sur le Roman d'Ascension Sociale au XVIIIe Siècle (1975)
- Rehearsing the Revolution: The Staging of Marat’s Death, 1793-1797 (1982) (Note: Reviews of this book:)
- Monstrous Imagination (1993) (Note: Reviews of this book:)
- Mourning Glory: The Will of the French Revolution (1997) (Note: Reviews of this book:)
- The Culture of Disaster (2012) (Note: Reviews of this book:)
- (ed. by Jean-Luc Steinmetz) Les Enfants du capitaine Grant – vingt mille lieues sous les mers (2012)
- (ed. by Steinmetz) L'Île mystérieuse/Le Sphinx des glaces (2012)
- (ed. by Steinmetz) Voyage au centre de la terre et autres romans (2016)
- (ed. by Steinmetz) Michel Strogoff et autres romans (2017)
- (ed. by Steinmetz) L'École des Robinsons et autres romans (2024)
