= The Realm of Shadows =

Role-playing game supplement

The Realm of Shadows is a 1997 role-playing game adventure published by Pagan Publishing for Call of Cthulhu.

== Plot summary ==
The Realm of Shadows is an adventure in which a 1940s campaign has investigators confront ghouls, sinister cults, and other horrors across Massachusetts, the Dreamlands, and the jungles of French Guiana through four adventures.

== Reviews ==
- Pyramid
- Backstab #6
- Backstab #26 (as "Les Royaume des Ombres")
- Dragon #249
