= Pagan Publishing =

Role-playing game publisher

- Industry: role-playing game
- Founded: 1990; 36 years ago
- Founder: John Scott Tynes
- Headquarters: Columbia, United States

Pagan Publishing was a role-playing game publishing company founded by John Scott Tynes in 1990. It began by publishing a Call of Cthulhu role-playing game fanzine, The Unspeakable Oath. In 1994, the company moved from Columbia, Missouri to Seattle, Washington where it incorporated. The staff at this time included John Tynes as editor-in-chief, John H. Crowe III as business manager, Dennis Detwiller as art director, and Brian Appleton and Chris Klepac as editors. Tynes, Detwiller, and Adam Scott Glancy released the Delta Green modern Call of Cthulhu campaign setting in 1996. Pagan has released multiple other Call of Cthulhu products, including a foray into card games with Creatures & Cultists and miniature games with The Hills Rise Wild!.

Pagan was based in Seattle, Washington and comprised Adam Scott Glancy as business manager and John H. Crowe III and Brian Appleton as editors. It produced Call of Cthulhu books as well as non-gaming fiction and non-fiction under the Armitage House imprint.

The company went inactive in the late 2010s with Arc Dream Publishing, a company founded by Pagan veterans Dennis Detwiller and editor Shane Ivey, later taking over the publication of most of Pagan's material.

== History ==
Pagan Publishing was founded in 1990 in Columbia, Missouri by the 19-year-old John Tynes, who loved the work of H.P. Lovecraft and Robert Chambers. The company started with the magazine The Unspeakable Oath, with issue #1 (December 1990) as a digest-sized quarterly publication focusing on Call of Cthulhu material. Dennis Detwiller joined the company due to his interest in the magazine, contacting Tynes after he saw The Unspeakable Oath #3 (Summer 1991) and spending time volunteering for the company. Pagan Publishing released compilations of The Unspeakable Oath material, including: the anthology Courting Madness (1992); the card game Creatures & Cultists (1992) from The Unspeakable Oath #4 (Fall 1991); and The Weapons Compendium (1993) of weapon statistics both from the magazine and new weapons as well.

== Products ==
=== Call of Cthulhu Supplements ===
- Alone on Halloween by Scott David Aniolowski and John Tynes
- Devil's Children by David Conyers, David Godley and David Witteveen
- Mortal Coils
- Walker In The Wastes by John H. Crowe III
- Coming Full Circle by John H. Crowe III
- The Realm of Shadows by John H. Crowe III
- The Golden Dawn
- The Resurrected 1: Grace Under Pressure
- The Resurrected 2: Of Keys & Gates
- The Resurrected 3: Out of the Vault
- Final Flight by John H. Crowe III
- The Mysteries of Mesoamerica by Brian Appleton, John H. Crowe III, and Clint Staples
- Bumps in the Night by John H. Crowe III

==== Delta Green ====
- Delta Green (February 1, 1997), the basic sourcebook; ISBN 1-887797-08-4.
- Delta Green: Countdown (1999), the 2000s sourcebook, by John Tynes, Dennis Detwiller and Adam Scott Glancy, ISBN 1-887797-12-2.
- Delta Green Eyes Only Volume 1: Machinations of the Mi-go ISBN 1-887797-13-0.
- Delta Green Eyes Only Volume 2: The Fate.
- Delta Green Eyes Only Volume 3: Project Rainbow ISBN 1-887797-21-1.
- See No Evil (Unspeakable Oath 16/17)
- Delta Green (May 2007), the basic sourcebook with dual BRP/D20 stats; ISBN 1-887797-23-8.
- Delta Green: Eyes Only (November 2007), a compilation of the Eyes Only chapbooks with additional material; ISBN 1-887797-27-0.

=== Fiction ===
- Delta Green: Alien Intelligence (Tynes Cowan Corp, March 1998), short stories collection, ISBN 1-887797-09-2.
- Delta Green: Dark Theatres (Armitage House, 1999), short stories collection, ISBN 1-887797-17-3.
- Delta Green: The Rules of Engagement (Tynes Cowan Corp, 2000), novel by John Tynes, ISBN 1-887797-16-5.
- Delta Green: Denied to the Enemy (Impressions, 2003), novel by Dennis Detwiller, ISBN 1-887797-24-6.
- The King in Yellow (Armitage House, 2006), play by Thom Ryng, ISBN 1-4116-8576-8.

=== Other Games ===
- The Hills Rise Wild miniature game
- Creatures & Cultists card game

=== Non-Fiction ===
- A Cthulhu Mythos Bibliography & Concordance
- The Lurker in the Lobby
