= The Unspeakable Oath =

The Unspeakable Oath is a game magazine that was published by Pagan Publishing from 1990 to 2001, and later by Arc Dream Publishing starting in 2010.

== History ==
Issue #1, cover art by Blair Reynolds

John Tynes founded Pagan Publishing in 1990 in Columbia, Missouri with a volunteer staff of gamers from Columbia including Jeff Barber, Brian Bevel, John H. Crowe III, Les Dean, and Chris Klepac. Together they put together The Unspeakable Oath #1 (December 1990), the first publication from the company, a digest-sized quarterly magazine focusing on Call of Cthulhu. Keith Herber of Chaosium noticed this first issue and helped Tynes recruit Cthulhu writers including Scott David Aniolowski and Kevin Ross. Pagan was then able to publish The Unspeakable Oath #2 (Spring 1991) and The Unspeakable Oath #3 (Summer 1991). The third issue led Dennis Detwiller to move to Columbia to work at Pagan.

At first, The Unspeakable Oath was solely devoted to Call of Cthulhu. The first six issues (1990–1992) had semi-professional production values, including covers of black & white cardstock. Writers for the magazine included several past and future Cthulhu authors, such as Steve Hatherly, Keith Herber, and Scott David Aniolowski. The Unspeakable Oath #7 (Fall 1992) was the first issue to make use of sturdier covers, and with The Unspeakable Oath #10 (Fall 1993), the magazine was increased to the size of a role-playing game book and given the first full-color cover. As these upgrades were implemented, Pagan began publishing other supplements so they dropped the magazine in frequency. Issues #11–#15 were published once per year on average from 1994 to 1997. After a 4-year hiatus, only one more issue, The Unspeakable Oath #16/17, was published by Pagan themselves in 2001.

After another long hiatus, Dennis Detwiller's RPG company Arc Dream Publishing acquired a license for The Unspeakable Oath from Pagan, which they were able to publish starting with Issue #18, which appeared in December 2010. Arc Dream has since published a couple of issues annually on average. In 2017, Arc Dream Publishing released "Old Ones Rising", a softcover compilation of issues 18-21 of The Unspeakable Oath.

== Reception ==
Wayne Ligon reviewed issue #2 of The Unspeakable Oath in White Wolf #29 (Oct./Nov., 1991), rating it a 4 out of 5 and stated that "The Unspeakable Oath is a top-notch magazine and I wish it a long life. Pick up this gem at once."

In the November–December 1993 edition of Pyramid (Issue #4), Chris W. McCubbin reviewed issues 7, 8, and 9 of The Unspeakable Oath and gave the magazine a strong recommendation, saying, "The final assessment on The Unspeakable Oath is simple — every gamer with an interest in Call of Cthulhu (which means virtually every mature and intelligent gamer) should read this magazine religiously, and that's all there is to it."

In the January 1994 edition of Dragon (Issue #201), Allen Varney was similarly impressed, saying, "Chaosium’s Call of Cthulhu game (CoC) has spawned the best one-game support magazine I’ve ever seen: The Unspeakable Oath. This 80-page wonder crawls forth quarterly from Pagan Publishing, a small Columbia, Missouri company — more accurately, one talented and energetic guy named John Tynes." Varney praised the magazine's articles as "Fascinating features, columns, letters, and huge amounts of period source material (which is sorely lacking in Chaosium's own support for CoC)." He also admired the artwork, "unsettlingly illustrated by Blair Reynolds and others." Varney concluded that the magazine was "an Elder Godsend for both Keepers and players."

The version of The Unspeakable Oath by Arc Dream Publishing won the 2013 Silver Ennie Award for "Best Aid/Accessory".

In his 2023 book Monsters, Aliens, and Holes in the Ground, RPG historian Stu Horvath noted, "The Unspeakable Oath, launched in 1990, was indispensable for serious Call of Cthulhu players and would eventually spawn Delta Green."

== Reviews ==
- Pyramid 16/17
- Casus Belli #77
