= John Scott Tynes =

American game designer

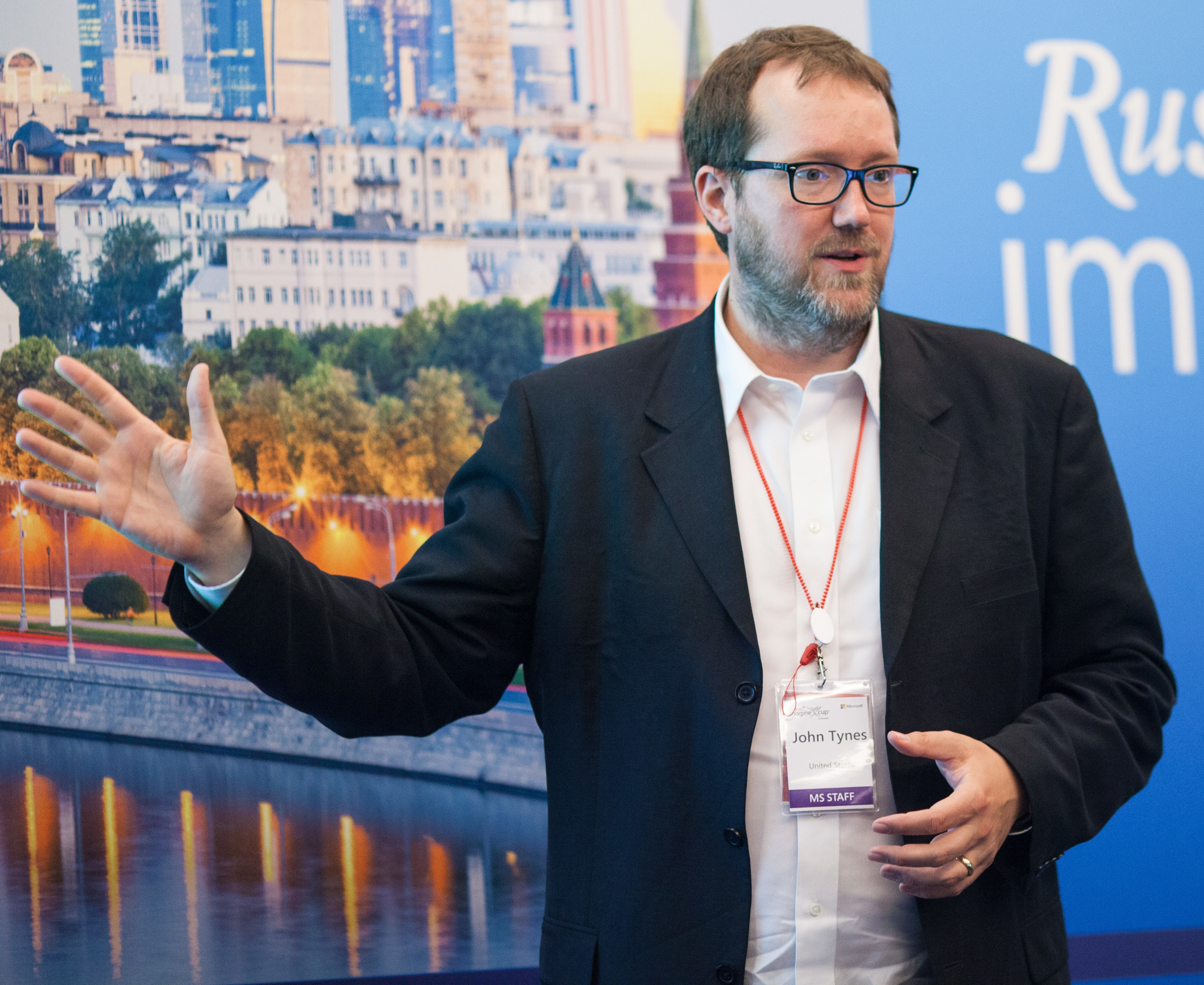
Tynes at the 2013 Imagine Cup in St. Petersburg, Russia

John Scott Tynes (born 1971) is an American writer best known for his work on role-playing games such as Unknown Armies, Delta Green, Puppetland, and for his company, Tynes Cowan Corporation. Under its imprint, Pagan Publishing, Tynes Cowan Corp. produces third-party books for the Call of Cthulhu role-playing game under license from Chaosium as well as fiction and non-fiction books under its imprint, Armitage House.

== Career ==
John Tynes founded Pagan Publishing in 1990 at the age of 19 in Columbia, Missouri, with a volunteer staff. Tynes founded Pagan's The Unspeakable Oath magazine. Dennis Detwiller reached out to Tynes after seeing an issue of The Unspeakable Oath, and then began volunteering with Pagan. Tynes designed the board game Creatures & Cultists. Tynes began working at Wizards of the Coast in May 1994, when Jonathan Tweet was the new role-playing game department lead. Tynes was the first content lead on the Magic: The Gathering trading card game. Tynes decided to move Pagan Publishing to Seattle that year, and the company became incorporated, and after the move many of the projects Tynes envisioned for the company materialized. Tynes resigned from his position at Wizards of the Coast in June 1995, disliking their new corporate branding ideals, and he moved on to work at Daedalus Games. Daedalus hired Tynes to work as their role-playing game line editor. Tynes, Detwiller and Adam Scott Glancy developed the Delta Green (1996) supplement to Call of Cthulhu, and they expanded their setting in 1999 with Delta Green: Countdown. Tynes continued to work for Daedalus Games until they ceased production in 1997.

Tynes met Greg Stolze when they worked on the supplement "Wildest Dreams" (1993) for Over the Edge. Tynes had been developing the background for the role-playing game that would become Unknown Armies since 1994, and Stolze helped write the mechanics for the game. Tynes took Unknown Armies to Archon Games even though Atlas Games had expressed interest, until Tynes and Stolze learned that founder Lisa Manns was shutting Archon down and she returned the game rights to them; they sought a new publisher, and so Atlas Games published the game in January 1999. Atlas hired Tynes in 1999 as the line editor to work on Unknown Armies.

Tynes designed Puppetland (1999) for Hogshead Publishing. Tynes and Robin Laws wrote a new version of the Feng Shui role-playing game for Atlas Games, published in 1999. Tynes was the original line editor for Feng Shui. Tynes wrote the adventure Three Days to Kill (2000) which Atlas published using their Penumbra d20 brand, and the adventure was the first printed d20 product to ever go on sale. Tynes designed the board game The Hills Rise Wild!

Tynes told his partners on January 1, 2001, that he was leaving the role-playing game industry, expecting to be fully out of the field by 2002, and Adam Scott Glancy became the new Pagan president. Wizards of the Coast contacted Tynes with an offer to write background material for their Call of Cthulhu version using the d20 System, so he accepted and with the help of writers from Pagan he was able to produce the material by his 2002 deadline.

Following the end of Unknown Armies in 2003, Tynes withdrew from the tabletop gaming industry in order to pursue other interests, particularly film and video games. He was the producer of Pirates of the Burning Sea, a massively multiplayer online role-playing game developed by Flying Lab Software, and published in 2008 by Sony Online Entertainment. After its launch, he joined Microsoft Game Studios to work on various Xbox Live Arcade titles including South Park Let's Go Tower Defense Play!, Toy Soldiers, and Full House Poker as a producer and game designer.

Tynes has written about games for Salon, The Escapist, Pyramid, X360 UK, and The Stranger.
