= Star Rovers (role-playing game) =

Role-playing game published in 1981

Star Rovers is a role-playing game published by Archive Miniatures and Game Systems in 1981.

== Description ==
Star Rovers is a science-fiction space-adventure system. The rules cover combat with guns, melee weapons, and martial arts, in gravity or zero-gravity. The game also includes rules for starships and equipment. Other rules define fatigue, disease, explosives, prospecting and other jobs, interstellar law, starships, and star systems. The game includes a timeline chart, plus deck plans for five starships and a spaceport cantina.

== Publication history ==
Star Rovers was designed by Nevile Stocken, Charles Hoffman, Carole Rode Hoffman, David A. Hargrave, Dennis Huey, and Steve Lortz, and published by Archive Miniatures and Game Systems in 1981 as a boxed set containing a 140-page book, a chart, six maps, two reference sheets, and dice.

== Reception ==
William A. Barton reviewed Star Rovers, Module 1 in The Space Gamer No. 44. Barton commented that "If your taste tends toward the fantastic in SF and you don't mind waiting for a space travel module, you may find Star Rovers to your liking. If you prefer science fiction or want a complete system to start with, your money will best be spent elsewhere."
