= The Lost Grimoire =

Fantasy role-playing game supplement

- Designers: David A. Hargrave
- Publishers: Dragon Tree Press
- Publication: 1984
- Genres: Fantasy

The Lost Grimoire is a 1984 role-playing game supplement published by Dragon Tree Press for Arduin.

== Contents ==
The Lost Grimoire is a supplement in which expanded rules are presented for adaptability, magic, weapons, spells, alchemy, new monsters, additional character races, and more.

== Publication history ==
In 1977, David A. Hargrave failed to find a publisher to publish books describing his home fantasy role-playing campaign setting Arduin, and founded Grimoire Games in order to self-publish the first three volumes. When Grimoire Games failed to make enough money to publish new books, Shannon Appelcline noted that Dragon Tree Press became the de facto publisher for the Arduin game, and "The result was five more Grimoires, from Arduin Grimoire Vol. IV: The Lost Grimoire (1984) to Arduin Grimoire Vol. VIII: The Winds of Chance (1988). These new books had some rules, but focused more on the setting of Arduin itself. They were also more generic than some of the earlier Arduin works, and thus could more easily be used in a variety of settings." The first of these books, Lost Grimoire: The Arduin Grimoire Vol. IV, was written by Hargrave and published by Dragon Tree Press in 1984 as a digest-sized 100-page book.

== Reception ==
In Issue 34 of Abyss, Dave Nalle commented, "It is not quite as thrilling as its three predecessors, but it is more smoothly produced and more universally useful. Even if you don't want to use the outrageous and original ideas it offers it is a worthwhile read just to get a glimpse of one of the first and greatest role-playing campaign worlds.

In his 1990 book The Complete Guide to Role-Playing Games, game critic Rick Swan called this book "an interesting compilation of essays about magical devices, monsters and a variety of other topics that can be used as adventure springboards."
