= Arduin Treasure Pak =

Fantasy role-playhing game supplement

- Cover page
- Designers: David A. Hargrave
- Publishers: Grimoire Games
- Publication: 1977
- Genres: Fantasy

Arduin Treasure Pak is a supplement published by Grimoire Games in 1977 for the fantasy role-playing game Arduin.

== Contents ==
Half of a cardsheet showing artwork on the front of four cards

Arduin Treasure Pak contains a collection of twelve cardstock sheets; each sheet contains 8 illustrated cards that can be cut apart. Each card contains a monster or item with a full description on the reverse. Three of the sheets contain monsters from the previously published Arduin Grimoire. Other sheets contain artifacts, and weapons, and some are blank, for the gamemaster to fill in. A second version contains a collection of Magic Artifacts from Arduin, Magik Weapons from Arduin, and Monsters from Arduin.

== Publication history ==
Arduin Treasure Pak was written by David A. Hargrave and published by Grimoire Games in 1977 as 12 cardstock sheets. A second version was also published in 1977 by International Gamers Association.

== Reception ==
In Issue 17 of Abyss (February 1982), Dave Nalle commented, "The art in this set is excellent, but there is hardly any new material (most of the monsters are in the Arduin Grimoire books)." Nalle concluded, "it can be a good visual aid, although the price [$7.95] seems a bit stiff."
