= House of the Rising Sun (Arduin) =

House of the Rising Sun is a 1986 role-playing game supplement published by Dragon Tree Press for Arduin.

== Contents ==
House of the Rising Sun is a supplement in which additional rules are introduced for new character classes including spells, alchemy, artifacts, and monsters.

== Publication history ==
House of the Rising Sun: The Arduin Grimoire Vol. VI was written by David A. Hargrave with art by Roland Brown and published by Dragon Tree Press in 1986 as a 120-page digest-sized book.

== Reviews ==
- Abyss #41 (Winter, 1987)
