= Sword Lords =

Sword Lords is a 1981 board game published by Archive Miniatures & Game Systems.

== Gameplay ==
Sword Lords is a game in which players can run any of the several fantasy battles provided, or design their own battles.

== Reception ==
W. G. Armintrout reviewed Sword Lords in The Space Gamer No. 46. Armintrout commented that "This is incredible - why did Archive do an elegant production job on Sword Lords without editing the rules? The idea is entertaining, the components are wonderful, but I can't recommend the present edition."
