= Caliban (disambiguation) =

Caliban is a character in William Shakespeare's play The Tempest.

Caliban may also refer to:

== Music ==
- Caliban (band), a metalcore band from Germany
- Caliban's Dream, a track written by Underworld for the Isles of Wonder opening ceremony of the 2012 summer Olympics in London

== Fiction ==
- Caliban (Marvel Comics), a mutant character in the Marvel Comics Universe
- Isaac Asimov's Caliban, the first of a trilogy of science-fiction novels by Roger MacBride Allen
- Caliban (Arduin dungeon), a dungeon module from the Arduin series
- Calibans are native lifeforms in Forty Thousand in Gehenna, a science fiction novel by CJ Cherryh
- Caliban's War, the second book in The Expanse novel series
- Caliban, a warframe from the 2013 free-to-play rpg shooter Warframe

== Other ==
- Caliban (moon), a moon of Uranus
- Hubert Phillips used this pseudonym
