= Dark Dreams =

Dark Dreams is a 1985 role-playing game supplement published by Dragon Tree Press for Arduin.

== Contents ==
Dark Dreams is a supplement in which expanded rules for death, street gangs, alchemy, magic, gladiators, new monsters, minidracs, and the fog of war are offered.

== Publication history ==
Dark Dreams: The Arduin Grimoire Vol. V was written by Dave A. Hargrave and published by Dragon Tree Press in 1985 as a digest-sized 80-page book.

== Reviews ==
- Abyss #38 (Summer, 1986)
