= Arduin Character Sheets Combined Pak =

Arduin Character Sheets Combined Pak is a 1980 role-playing game supplement published by International Gamers Association.

== Contents ==
Arduin Character Sheets Combined Pak is a set of character sheets for Arduin.

Arduin Character Sheets Combined Pak consisted of twenty-four character record sheets, each of which had an illustration of a different character type on the reverse.

== Publication history ==
Arduin Character Sheets Combined Pak was written by David A. Hargrave, with art by Jeffrey W. Brain, and was published by Grimoire Games in 1980 as 24 cardstock sheets.

== Reception ==
Steve Jackson reviewed Arduin Character Sheets Combined Pak in The Space Gamer No. 31. Jackson commented that "Character sheets are useful, and this one isn't bad. My only quibble is the price [...] most people would rather design their own and make photocopies. Not as pretty, but easier on the budget."
