= The Arduin Adventure =

Tabletop role-playing game

Cover art by Greg Espinoza

The Arduin Adventure is a 1981 role-playing game published by Grimoire Games. Although previous publications by Grimoire used the rules from the fantasy role-playing game Dungeons & Dragons, The Arduin Adventure attempted to create a new rules system.

== Contents ==
The Arduin Adventure is a role-playing game that serves as an introduction to both fantasy role-playing and adventure gaming, that presents a simpler version of the previously published Arduin Grimoire trilogy using the 2nd-edition game rules.

== Publication history ==
Starting in 1977, David A. Hargrave published several volumes of the Arduin Grimoires, a fantasy RPG setting based on the rules for Dungeons & Dragons. In 1980, Hargrave created The Arduin Adventure, a game system designed as "an alternative to Dungeons and Dragons for veteran players" that used the setting Hargrave had created in the Arduin Grimoires. It was originally scheduled to be released for Christmas of 1980, but a setback was caused when the typesetters refused to do all the lay out the many tables in the game, so it was not until early 1981 that the game was published as a boxed set with cover art by Greg Espinoza containing a 64-page book, three cardstock artifact sheets, three character sheets, and dice; the 64-page book was also sold separately.

While the Arduin Grimoires had used the original Dungeons & Dragons game to build the foundation for its own game mechanics, The Arduin Adventure allowed Arduin to be a fully standalone role-playing game system, written to help explain role-playing to inexperienced gamers.

== Reception ==
Clayton Miner reviewed The Arduin Adventure for Pegasus magazine #3 (1981), and stated that "The Arduin Adventure is a project that shows a lot of thought and effort before production, and is definitely a useful item for any gamer who is brand new to role player. This item may even be useful for more experienced gamers who are interested in using the Arduin Trilogy, but are having problems understanding new rules."

John T. Sapienza Jr. reviewed The Arduin Adventure for Different Worlds magazine and stated that "it supplies good ideas on how to role-play and how to GM, and that plus the elaborate scenario of the wizard's tower make this a good buy for those who have already been exposed to adventure gaming, and are looking for more gaming aids to help them get started at it themselves."

Mike Kardos reviewed The Arduin Adventure in The Space Gamer No. 52. Kardos commented that "I would recommend Arduin to those who would like to add some of the rules to their campaign. For a few more dollars, you could buy a better and more complete fantasy role-playing game."

In Issue 13 of Abyss, Dave Nalle thought that Character Creation, Magic and Combat were strengths of the game and liked the sample adventure, but found the section on Experience "weak." Nalle also noted "At points the rules are a bit sloppy, especially towards the end." Nalle concluded, "If I were running a D&D campaign and wanted to introduce new players to D&D, I would use this system. The system is more believable and more sensible, but close enough to D&D for hard-core types."

In his 1990 book The Complete Guide to Role-Playing Games, game critic Rick Swan noted that this game was clearly a derivation of D&D, but pointed out that it "boasts a fair number of appealing innovations" and "introduces a number of unusual twists." Swan didn't recommend the game for beginning players due to "Ambiguous rules, an unnecessarily complicated combat system, and insufficient instructions for staging adventures." Swan concluded by giving the game a rating of 2.5 out of 4, saying, "There are a lot of good ideas here, however, and an enterprising referee might be able to adapt some of them to a different game."

Shannon Appelcline commented that The Arduin Adventure was one of the last two professionally produced boxed products from Grimoire Games, which contributed to the company "looking like a gaming company really finding its feet. However, The Arduin Adventure was something more: it marked a new direction for Arduin itself." He noted that "This product also fulfilled some of Hargrave's desire for a 'new game' that he'd written about when he finished The Runes of Doom. He hadn't wanted to get away from Arduin so much as from D&D. Though the Arduin Adventure game system was still clearly D&D-derived, it was a first step away that introduced some new rules, most notably a totally new initiative system called 'CF' (coordination factor). This movement away from D&D was a path that Hargrave would continue walking for the rest of his life." He felt that "The general organization of The Arduin Adventure — with one and two-page chapters each covering a basic concept — was quite innovative and definitely ahead of its time." Appelcline concluded that "The Arduin Adventure wasn't well-received by the industry at the time. By 1980 or 1981, a bare-bones not-quite-retroclone of OD&D wasn't that exciting — except to Arduin players, of course, who had long needed this skeleton to hang their games upon. If anything, the reception has cooled since then. Whereas The Arduin Trilogy is still appreciated and respected for its gonzo imagination and the Arduin Dungeons for their unforgiving nature, The Arduin Adventure is very much an artifact of its time."
