= The Howling Tower =

1979 gaming module

- Cover of The Howling Tower
- Designers: David A. Hargrave
- Publishers: Grimoire Games
- Publication: 1979
- Genres: Fantasy
- Systems: Arduin

The Howling Tower (also known as Arduin Dungeon Number Two) was a standalone short story and gaming module written in 1979 by David A. Hargrave and published by Grimoire Games. It was based upon Hargrave's gaming system known as Arduin. It is the second of only four standalone "dungeon" books created by Hargrave as an extension of his Arduin Multiverse, which at the time of The Howling Tower's publication was known as The Arduin Trilogy.

== Setting ==
Arduin Dungeon No. 2: The Howling Tower is an adventure scenario for player characters of 1st to 4th level, set in a dungeon with nine levels.

At 32 pages, The Howling Tower contains maps, descriptions, a short story, and overviews, with detailed room descriptions and trap matrices, two ground level dungeons and six tower levels with eight pocket sized magic artifact cards and eight illustrated monster cards with statistics.

Cover illustrations are by Greg Espinoza, back cover and interior illustrations are by Erol Otus.

== System ==
While designed for use with the Arduin gaming system, The Howling Tower is usable with any d20 or other RPG system. The module was recommended for characters level 1 thru 4 (in the Arduin universe).

== History ==
Arduin Dungeon No. 2: The Howling Tower was written by David A. Hargrave, with illustrations by Erol Otus, and was published by Grimoire Games in 1979 as a 32-page book with two cardstock sheets.

Shannon Appelcline commented that "Following the publication of Caliban, the rest of 1979 was a great year for Grimoire Games. They published two more Dave Hargrave dungeons, Arduin Dungeon #2: The Howling Tower (1979) and Arduin Dungeon #3: The Citadel of Thunder (1979). None of these were ground-breaking — like the Arduin Grimoires were — but they were tough, competitive adventures of the sort more common at the dawn of the industry."

The Howling Tower was originally published by Grimoire Games and went out of print in 1984. In 2002 reprints of The Howling Tower were made available from Emperor's Choice Games and Miniatures, but were discontinued in August 2006. Since then, the company folded The Howling Tower and all other Arduin dungeon modules into a single publication called "Vaults of the Weaver".

== See also ==
- Caliban: Arduin Dungeon Number One
- The Citadel of Thunder: Arduin Dungeon Number Three
- Death Heart: Arduin Dungeon Number Four
