= The Citadel of Thunder =

Role-playing game supplement

- Thousand Thunder Falls from The Citadel of Thunder
- Designers: David A. Hargrave
- Illustrators: Greg Espinoza
- Publishers: Grimoire Games
- Publication: 1979
- Genres: Fantasy
- Systems: Arduin

The Citadel of Thunder (also known as Arduin Dungeon Number Three) was a standalone short story and gaming module written in 1979 by David A. Hargrave and published by Grimoire Games. It was based upon Hargrave's gaming system known as Arduin. It is the third of only four standalone "dungeon" books created by Hargrave as an extension of his Arduin Multiverse, which at the time of The Howling Tower's publication was known as The Arduin Trilogy.

== Setting ==
Arduin Dungeon No. 3: The Citadel of Thunder is an adventure scenario for player characters of 5th to 8th level, set in a dungeon with four levels.

At 24 pages, The Citadel of Thunder contains overland maps with area descriptions and encounter charts, four dungeon levels with maps and room descriptions, eight pocket sized magic artifact cards and eight illustrated monster cards with statistics. There were also unique new traps in a matrix at the rear of the module.

Illustrations were contributed by Greg Espinoza.

== System ==
While designed for use with the Arduin gaming system, The Citadel of Thunder is usable with any d20 or other RPG system. It was designed for mid-level characters (levels 5 thru 8).

== History ==
Arduin Dungeon No. 3: The Citadel of Thunder was written by David A. Hargrave, with illustrations by Greg Espinoza, and was published by Grimoire Games in 1979 as a 32-page book with two cardstock sheets.

Shannon Appelcline commented that "Following the publication of Caliban, the rest of 1979 was a great year for Grimoire Games. They published two more Dave Hargrave dungeons, Arduin Dungeon #2: The Howling Tower (1979) and Arduin Dungeon #3: The Citadel of Thunder (1979). None of these were ground-breaking — like the Arduin Grimoires were — but they were tough, competitive adventures of the sort more common at the dawn of the industry."

The Citadel of Thunder was originally published by Grimoire Games and went out of print in 1984. In 2002 reprints of The Citadel of Thunder were made available from Emperor's Choice Games and Miniatures, but were discontinued in August 2006. Since then, the company folded The Citadel of Thunder and all other Arduin dungeon modules into a single publication called "Vaults of the Weaver".

== See also ==
- Caliban: Arduin Dungeon Number One
- The Howling Tower: Arduin Dungeon Number Two
- Death Heart: Arduin Dungeon Number Four
