= Death Heart =

Story and gaming module

- "It Sure Looks Peaceful Down There..."
- Designers: David A. Hargrave
- Publishers: Grimoire Games
- Publication: 1980
- Genres: Fantasy
- Systems: Arduin

Death Heart (also known as Arduin Dungeon Number Four) was a standalone short story and gaming module written in 1980 by David A. Hargrave and published by Grimoire Games. It was the last of Hargrave's officially released dungeon modules before his death in 1988 and was an extension of his Arduin Multiverse, which at the time of Death Heart's publication was known as The Arduin Trilogy.

== Setting ==
Arduin Dungeon No. 4: Death Heart is an adventure scenario that details the wilderness areas near the first three dungeon scenarios published in the series (Caliban, The Howling Tower, and The Citadel of Thunder), and also describes one more savage dungeon.

At 24 pages, Death Heart contained overland maps, regional descriptions, a short story, and historical overviews. The package also contained a set of 16 unique creature and treasure cards, which could be detached and used in-game. There were also unique new traps in a matrix at the rear of the module.

Also included was reference material regarding The Howling Tower and its relevance to the Arduin multiverse, plus an overview of the last known locations of Caliban.

== System ==
While designed for use with the Arduin gaming system, Death Heart was usable with any d20 or other RPG system.

== History ==
Arduin Dungeon No. 4: Death Heart was written by David A. Hargrave, with illustrations by Carolyn Schultz, and was published by Grimoire Games in 1980 as a 32-page book with two cardstock sheets.

Shannon Appelcline commented that "Somewhat surprisingly [after its first three dungeons in 1979] only three more Grimoire Games publications followed before the company disappeared (for the first time): Arduin Dungeon #4 & Overland Adventure: Death Hart (1980), the boxed Arduin Adventure (1981), and a boxed set of The Arduin Trilogy (1981)."

Death Heart was originally published by Grimoire Games and went out of print in 1984. In 2002 reprints of Death Heart were made available from Emperor's Choice Games and Miniatures, but were discontinued in August 2006. Since then, the company folded Death Heart and all other Arduin dungeon modules into a single publication called "Vaults of the Weaver".

== See also ==
- Caliban: Arduin Dungeon Number One
- The Howling Tower: Arduin Dungeon Number Two
- The Citadel of Thunder: Arduin Dungeon Number Three
