= The Compleat Arduin Book One: The Rules =

The Compleat Arduin Book One: The Rules is a 1993 role-playing supplement for Arduin published by Grimoire Games.

== Contents ==
The Compleat Arduin Book One: The Rules is a supplement in which rules are presented for the world of Arduin.

== Publication history ==
Shannon Appelcline discussed how The Compleat Arduin two-book set at 450 total pages "was the largest Arduin release. It was clearly based upon the original rules - as they'd developed through The Arduin Adventure and Revised Arduin: A Primer - but polished and reorganized."

== Reception ==
Richard Thomas reviewed Arduin Book One and Arduin Book Two in White Wolf #38 (1993), rating them a 4 out of 5 and stated that "I recommend these books to any fantasy gamer or GM, both as a playable system and, more importantly, as a storehouse of ideas to enhance any campaign. Dave would have been proud."

== Reviews ==
- Vortext #8 (Spring, 1993)
