= Arduin =

Tabletop fantasy role-playing game setting

- The Arduin Trilogy covers
- Designers: David A. Hargrave
- Publishers: David A. Hargrave (1977–1978); Grimoire Games (1978–1983, 1990s); Dragon Tree Press (1984–1988); Emperors Choice Games and Miniatures (2002–)
- Publication: 1977–present
- Genres: Fantasy, Science fiction, Horror
- Systems: Custom

Arduin is a fictional universe and fantasy role-playing system created in the mid-1970s by David A. Hargrave. It was the first published "cross-genre" fantasy RPG, with everything from interstellar wars to horror and historical drama, although it was based primarily in the medieval fantasy genre.

== Development history ==
Arduin was one of the earliest challengers to TSR's Dungeons & Dragons. It began in the mid-1970s as a personal project Hargrave created to share with friends, but became so popular that he was inspired to publish the material.

Hargrave was one of several early RPG players from the San Francisco Bay area to also become a game designer, having started by creating variant rules for his weekly Dungeons & Dragons campaign. The setting of Arduin was heavily house-ruled and included hundreds of players and was situated in a neutral ground between nations that were once at war with each other. Greg Stafford of Chaosium played in the Arduin game run by Hargrave for a while around 1976, and he approached Hargrave to get the game system published as "The Arduin Grimoire". Chaosium listed the resulting book on its publication schedule for February 1977 to be its first role-playing game product, but the company instead rejected the incomplete manuscript that Hargrave submitted. Hargrave self-published The Arduin Grimoire in 1977 and two follow-up Grimoire books in 1978, and the three books became what was known as The Arduin Trilogy. They are, in order, The Arduin Grimoire (1977), Welcome to Skull Tower (1978), and The Runes Of Doom (1978).

The Arduin books attempted to add many interesting and notable features to the fantasy role playing milieu. In addition to new rules, the Arduin Trilogy contained unique new spells and character classes, new monsters, new treasures, maps, storylines, extensive demonography, and all sorts of charts and lists which detailed the Arduin "multiverse", many of which were new to role-playing gamers of the time.

Dave Hargrave appreciated the "brilliant idea" behind the original "Dungeons & Dragons", but was dissatisfied with the rules and playability of the game and decided to come up with his own design for fantasy role playing rules. Although the Arduin books did not explicitly claim to be a Dungeons & Dragons supplement, they were treated as such by most users. As follows, there was contention in the RPG world that the Arduin system lacked cohesion. It was only with the publication of the later book The Arduin Adventure (1981) that a true standalone system began to evolve, where other systems were not needed to adequately run a game. The Arduin Adventure was eventually written to replace use of the D&D core book. Material from all of these were subsequently used as the basis for The Compleat Arduin (1992), a standalone system.

== Publication history ==
The original Arduin suite of supplements, dungeon modules, and gaming aids were initially self-published (1977–78), but were then later produced by Grimoire Games. Dragon Tree Press produced four further Arduin supplements in the mid-1980s before the Arduin rights and properties were purchased by David Bukata and George De Rosa of Emperors Choice Games and Miniatures in 1998.

=== Grimoire Games ===
Grimoire Games was a publishing company run by Jim Mathis. Active from 1978 to mid 1981, Grimoire Games's primary focus was the early Arduin series of RPG supplements, written by Hargrave. The Arduin Trilogy is the most famous of the Hargrave supplements.

Hargrave sold Arduin in 1978 to one of his players, Jim Mathis, who started Grimoire Games out of a UC campus apartment in Berkely to publish Arduin material by Hargrave beginning with a series of four adventure modules and two boxed sets. By the time The Arduin Adventure was published in 1981, the company was experiencing increasing financial challenges, and in 1984 its last publication for many years was 100 copies of the Arduin: A Primer booklet of revised rules; Mathis moved to San Diego and continued to sell products from the company for a few years. Hargrave continued to publish Arduin material through Dragon Tree Press until he died in 1988, at which point the rights to Arduin returned to Mathis and Grimoire Games.

Mathis worked with Mark Schynert to complete the last unfinished Arduin manuscript by Hargrave, and Grimoire Games eventually published it as The Compleat Arduin in 1993 with financial assistance from a games distributor; however the large work was expensive and outdated and only sold less than half of its print run, and the distributor took a loss, and it became the last publication by Grimoire Games.

== Partial bibliography ==
Arduin releases timeline Original releases in blue Grimoire Games releases in green Dragon Tree releases in pink Emperors Choice releases in yellow
1977	Vol. I
1978	Vol. II, III
1979	Dungeon No. 1-3
1980	Dungeon No. 4
1981	Trilogy boxed set, Adventure
1982
1983
1984	Revised Primer, Vol. IV
1985	Vol. V
1986	Vol. VI
1987	Vol. VII
1988	Vol. VIII
1989
1990
1991
1992	Compleat Book One, Two
1993
1994
1995
1996
1997
1998
1999
2000
2001
2002	Vol. IX
2003
2004	World Book of Khaas
2005
2006
2007
2008
2009	Eternal
2010
2011
2012
2013
2014
2015
2016
2017
2018
2019
2020
2021
2022
2023	Arduin Artifact & Monster Card Set
2024	Arduin Map Index guidebook, 2024 Arduin Map 30.5” x 39.5” discovery map, 2024 Isle Country of Chorynth Map redone'map, Khaora the 3rd continent map, large version, Khaora the 3rd continent map, smaller poster sized version

=== Books ===
- The Arduin Grimoire (Arduin Grimoire Vol. I), 1977.
  - There are four different editions(printings) of this volume. These editions(printings) differ via internal verbiage, cover and back cover artwork and some internal artwork (p. 79, among others).
  - The first edition (printing) of volume one features cover art by Erol Otus and references to Dungeons & Dragons.
  - The second edition (printing) of volume one features cover art by Erol Otus and the references to Dungeons & Dragons have been whited out and typed over.
  - The third edition(printing) has the cover picture of multiple characters fighting and on the back cover the female character is topless and is the David Hargrave character known as Shardra the Castrator that appears topless in the drawing on page 1 of Vol III The Runes of Doom, the page following the Table of Contents.
  - The fourth edition (printing) and later printings, which comprise the vast majority of copies of Vol 1, are identical to the third edition (printing) except that the topless woman on the back cover has a halter top (editorial swimwear) added to cover her up.
- Welcome to Skull Tower (Arduin Grimoire Vol. II), 1978.
- The Runes of Doom (Arduin Grimoire Vol. III), 1978. The first printings of the first three books were self-published by Dave Hargrave.
- The Arduin Trilogy is a box set containing the first three Arduin Grimoires and published by Grimoire Games in 1981.
- The Arduin Adventure, 1981. Arduin introductory boxed set. Contained the Arduin Adventure book (which was also available separately), a few sheets of magic items, three character sheets, and two 20-sided die. The 'Arduin Adventure' book also contains a basic adventure, 'The Forgotten Tower'.
- Revised Arduin: A Primer, 1984. A short (11 page) booklet outlining the "battle factor" system featured in Compleat Arduin.
- The Lost Grimoire (Arduin Grimoire Vol. IV), 1984
- Dark Dreams (Arduin Grimoire Vol. V), 1985
- The House of the Rising Sun (Arduin Grimoire Vol. VI), 1986
- Shadow Lands (Arduin Grimoire Vol. VII), 1987
- Winds of Chance (Arduin Grimoire Vol. VIII), 1988 (published posthumously)
- Compleat Arduin, Book One: The Rules, 1992
- Compleat Arduin, Book Two: Resources, 1992
- End War (Arduin Grimoire Vol. IX), 2002 (published posthumously)
- Arduin Artifacts & Monster card set (64 Artifact cards) (As specifically found in the first four Arduin dungeons: [3](Caliban, The Howling Tower, The Citadel of Thunder and Death Heart)), 2023
- Arduin Map Index An index of locations in the Country of Arduin an its border areas. 1337 entries; works with the original Arduin country map that was released in 2000, the 2024 Arduin country map, or as a stand alone list, 2024

=== Cardstock items ===
- Monsters from Arduin (24 monster cards) (First and second printings with different images exist.)
- Magic Weapons from Arduin (24 weapon cards) (First and second printings with different images exist.)
- Magic Artifacts from Arduin (24 Artifact cards) (First and second printings with different images exist.)
- Arduin Treasure Pak (a combination of the three items above).
- Arduin Character Pack (illustrated character sheets; listed elsewhere as Arduin Character Sheets Combined Pack) This is a set of 24 character sheets for different Arduin races/character classes. Each sheet has a unique illustration.
- Arduin Artifacts & Monster card set (64 Artifact cards) (As specifically found in the first four Arduin dungeons:(Caliban, The Howling Tower, The Citadel of Thunder and Death Heart))

=== Dungeon modules ===
- Arduin Dungeon No. 1: Caliban (1979, high level adventure)
- Arduin Dungeon No. 2: The Howling Tower (1979, low-level adventure)
- Arduin Dungeon No. 3: The Citadel of Thunder (1979, mid-level adventure)
- Arduin Dungeon No. 4: Death Heart (1980, high-level wilderness and dungeon adventures)

=== Later releases ===
- The Map of Arduin: A 2' × 3' four color poster-sized map of the Country of Arduin printed on parchment complete with legend and scale.
- World Book of Khaas: The Legendary Lands of Arduin; A world guide to the country of Arduin and the world and continent upon which it rests. 865 pages of world/campaign material. Unique for size and the absence of any game mechanics.
- Swords and Dragons: Fantasy Card Game; Fantasy themed card game from the world of Arduin.
- Vaults of the Weaver: A compilation of the 4 Arduin Dungeons along with Hive Home (the only example of a Phraint Hive ever completed by their creator David A. Hargrave) and the 13 part Heart of Darkness campaign, both never before published. Vaults was compiled and co-authored by his friend Paul Mosher.
- The Black Grimoire: All of Dave Hargrave's published spells.
- Arduin Artifacts & Monster card set: (64 Artifact cards) (As specifically found in the first four Arduin dungeons:(Caliban, The Howling Tower, The Citadel of Thunder and Death Heart))
- 2024 Map of Arduin: A 30.5” × 39.5” full color large poster-sized map of the Country of Arduin and its borders, printed on white parchment paper to give it an old age feel and look. It is a true map of discovery with approximately 1300 named locations on it.
- 2024 Map of KHAORA, the 3rd Continent: A 30.5” × 39.5” full color large poster-sized map of the Continent hand painted by William Watt with over 70 Countries being depicted and much more to even include the flags of each nation. It is printed on white parchment paper to give it an old age feel and look.
- 2024 Map of KHAORA, the 3rd Continent: A smaller version of the 30.5” × 39.5” full color regular poster-sized map of the Continent hand painted by William Watt with over 70 Countries being depicted and much more to even include the flags of each nation. It is printed on white parchment paper to give it an old age feel and look.
- 2024 Map of Chorynth: An approximately 18” x 22” full color large poster-sized map of the Island Country of Chorynth. It is printed on white parchment paper to give it an old age feel and look. This map has been updated with information discovered on the continent map from where it is located.

=== One-of-a-kind Arduin items ===
Hargrave's death in 1988 left many Arduin items press-ready but unpublished and/or incomplete. A few items he created on a whim for those he especially liked or was close to. Among these are the following:

The Book of the Shining Land
Created December/January, 1980-81. Dedication and signature inside front cover. This is a complete campaign area, designed as a generic adventure campaign suitable for insertion into any RPG, written by David for his longtime friend, writer Paul Mosher. The Book of the Shining Land comprises 118 handwritten pages of 10 1/4 × 7 7/8 quad ruled paper in a composition style notebook. It includes a Master Map of the area (approximately 100 miles square) and 59 "keyed" adventure area maps all cross-referenced off of the Master Map.

The Book of Dreams of Lost Sardath
Created October 1981. Similar in size and concept to The Book of the Shining Land, this work comprises 158 handwritten pages of 10 × 7 7/8 quad ruled paper in a composition style notebook. Includes a Master Map of an area approximately 100 miles square. This work was written by David for his longtime friend, writer Paul Mosher. It comprises a "lost" island kingdom containing 136 villages/towns/cities cross referenced on the Master Map as well as 79 adventure area maps, of which 31 are "keyed".

Lancer's Rest
Created October 1987. One of the last game-related items created by David A. Hargrave before his death in August 1988, Lancer's Rest was Lance Mazmanian's personal burial chamber, a very large single-level dungeon adventure which included an Arduin "Hell Spiral" and a 3,000 ft (910 m) pool where Mazmanian's corpse was entombed. Created by Hargrave as a tongue-in-cheek tribute, the adventure itself was essentially a quest to gain life-prolonging treasure while avoiding Mazmanian's wandering Avatar, an extremely powerful Lich-like entity who would either attack or help a party on random percentage roll.

Per Emperors Choice Games & Miniatures Corp.: Lancers Rest has been fully developed and written and art completed in 2023 and is to be released with the new Arduin Bloody Arduin rules system in 2025.

== Reception ==
In the April–May 1979 edition of White Dwarf magazine (Issue 12), Don Turnbull gave the just-published Trilogy a rating of only 4 out of 10, finding it disorganized, hard to read, and "a mass of information, no doubt useless to some and useful to others." Turnbull concluded "I could not advise anyone to buy The Grimoire from which to learn the fantasy game hobby from scratch, but if you want what is in effect a D&D supplement, don't mind the price and are prepared to be selective in what you extract from it, there will no doubt be useful snippets you could find."

In the Oct-Nov 1979 edition of Different Worlds (Issue 5), Mike Gunderloy admired the huge amount of supplementary information in the Arduin Trilogy that could be added to a D&D campaign. But he admitted the trilogy was not perfect, especially "the lack of organization. Rules relating to a single subject are often in different parts, even different volumes, of the trilogy. Worse, not only are there no cross-references to related sections, there is no index either." But Gunderloy concluded that any D&D gamemaster looking to improve their campaign world needed the trilogy: "No referee who has decided to expand his world should be without a copy of The Arduin Trilogy. Buy it, you'll be amply rewarded in the form of ideas and enjoyment."

Lawrence Schick, in his 1991 book Heroic Worlds, described Arduin as a "Fantasy system, derivative of Original D&D. In fact, the first Arduin rulebooks were thinly-disguised supplement for D&D – only later did Arduin grow into a stand-alone system. Arduin rules and scenarios are frequently unencumbered by the restraints of conventional good taste."

In his 2023 book Monsters, Aliens, and Holes in the Ground, RPG historian Stu Horvath noted, "with the Arduin zines, Hargrave plants the first seeds of transgression in RPGs. The zines seem calculated to shock, in the same way that some lurid heavy metal album covers sought to fluster squares with cartoon skulls, demons, and blood. That whiff of the forbidden would stick to RPGs for years, and it might be Arduin's greatest legacy."

== Reviews ==
- The Playboy Winner's Guide to Board Games

== Controversy and criticism ==
=== The TSR legal issue ===
In 1977, TSR objected to certain contents of the first Arduin book. David Hargrave negotiated with TSR about two points. First, Hargrave's foreword made it appear as though he advocated people copying game books (such as D&D) without buying them. Hargrave removed that foreword from later editions. Second, a Prismatic Wall spell in Arduin appeared to be plagiarized directly from D&D; Hargrave changed some of the description, including some colors. Hargrave further distanced himself from controversy by using white-out and typing correction tape to mask all direct references to Dungeons and Dragons, and then the volumes were reprinted exactly that way. In some versions of the Arduin printings, these so-called "corrections" are clearly visible.

=== Arduin mechanics ===
Much criticism was made of Hargrave's combat mechanics, to the point where many Game Masters simply used either their own versions, or those of TSR.

=== Greg Stafford and Chaosium ===
While David Hargrave was considered one of the "best of the best" of game masters, he was also known for having a somewhat volatile personality. The original role-playing community at large was split between love and mere tolerance of Hargrave's passions, and his infamous falling-out with Greg Stafford, which resulted in Hargrave naming an Arduin spell after him as revenge, is one such example. The spell was called Stafford's Star Bridge (The Arduin Grimoire, Volume 1, Page 41):

Stafford's Star Bridge is a 9th Level Mage (Magic-User) spell. It produces a rainbow-hued bridge of coruscating light that is 5 ft (1.5 m) wide and 20 ft (6.1 m) long per level of the caster over the level needed for use. The bridge will carry any weight, and it cannot be hit by non-magical things. The bridge can also be "keyed" to support any single type (or more), letting all others fall through selectively.

Hargrave felt that Stafford had betrayed him over a Chaosium publishing deal, thus "falling through selectively". According to Stafford, Hargrave was later very upset with himself for having created this spell and for his behavior in the situation.

== Notable illustrators ==
Phraint vs. Vroat (1979) by Erol Otus (from The Howling Tower)

Several notable illustrators worked on Arduin materials at various times over the years, including the following:

Erol Otus
The first printings of The Arduin Grimoire (specifically, The Arduin Trilogy, Vol. 1) contained artwork by Erol Otus, an artist who would later become known for his illustrations appearing on and in TSR's Dungeons & Dragons publications.
Otus' artwork was later removed from subsequent printings of The Arduin Grimoire.

Greg Espinoza
Greg Espinoza contributed many of the Arduin covers and interior illustrations (close to 80 pieces) from approximately 1978 to 1981. He drew many of the monster and artifact cards for several of the standalone dungeon modules, and also painted the box art (with airbrushing by Anthony Delgado) for Grimoire Games' The Arduin Adventure. Espinoza has created high-level work for decades via Blackthorne, TSR, Malibu, Eclipse, Antarctic Press, Tundra/Kitchen Sink Press, and Image Comics, among others. His Image Comics graphic novel "Pug" (with Derek McCulloch) was nominated for the 2011 Spinetingler Award, in the category of Best Crime Comic/Graphic Novel. In 2009, he was hired by Emperor's Choice Games to create new cover art for a hardcover reprinting of the original Arduin Grimoire Trilogy.

Brad Schenck
Brad Schenck (also known as Morno) contributed the cover of Welcome to Skull Tower (AG II). His is also the original design for the Arduin "Shield" now featured by Emperor's Choice Games and Miniatures as their trademark. He also did the cover for The Arduin Adventure rule book.

Michio Okamura
Michio Okamura was a regular contributor from the earliest volumes of the Arduin books, his distinct woodcut art style was featured on the cover of Dark Dreams (AG VI). Michio would later find employment at Blizzard North where he worked on Diablo and Diablo II.
