= Archive Miniatures & Game Systems =

Role-playing game

Archive Miniatures & Game Systems was one of the first companies to produce fantasy miniature figures following the birth of role-playing games in the 1970s.

== History ==
Typical octagonal base of an Archives miniature, 1977

Orc from Archive's 25 mm Middle Earth line, showing typical stretched octagonal base with clipped corners

One of the first fantasy role-playing games (RPGs) to be published after the appearance of Dungeons & Dragons in 1974 was White Bear and Red Moon, a fantasy RPG set in the world of Glorantha, created by Chaosium of Oakland, California in 1975. Chaosium searched for a company that could produce metal miniatures specific to Glorantha, and found Archive Miniatures in nearby Burlingame, run by head sculptor Neville Stocken and his wife Barbara. Chaosium granted their first license to Archive to create 25 mm Gloranthan miniatures.

In his 2014 book Designers & Dragons: The '70s, Shannon Appelcline noted that "Soon some of the counters from White Bear and Red Moon such as the darkness witch Cragspider and the centaur Ironhoof were represented in lead. Some of Archive's existing miniatures also got incorporated into the Gloranthan series, so that Stocken would have more licensed miniatures to sell immediately. Most notably, Archive's existing 'Pumpkinhead' figure became the infamous Gloranthan Jack O'Bear."

Archive soon released other licensed lines, including miniatures for J.R.R. Tolkien's Middle Earth, Chaosium's Runequest, TSR's Dungeons & Dragons, Lucasfilm's Star Wars, and Michael Moorcock's Elric of Melnibone.

Although the market quickly became flooded with metal miniatures from other American and British companies, those from Archive remained distinctive for their unique "stretched octagonal" bases, formed when the corners of the rectangular bases were clipped off.

In 1978, Archive also tried to move into the RPG market with a science fiction RPG called Star Rovers. Game designer David A. Hargrave, best known for creating the quirky fantasy RPG world known as Arduin, and who owned a games store in nearby Concord, announced he was working on a new game, likely Star Rovers. Hargrave was the lead developer for only a few months, until Archive's Neville Stocken took over, but Shannon Appelcline believes that "Hargrave's contributions still can be found in the final product, Star Rovers Module 1 (1981). Because of its wacky and gonzo nature, some have called it 'Arduin in Space.' Unfortunately, it also proved to be Archive's one and only roleplaying release."

By 1981, Archive had moved to San Mateo, and were advertising a "Monster-of-the-Month Club" in the pages of Dragon. In 1982, the company went out of business. Their miniatures lines were taken over by R*kiiv of Berkeley, California, which continued to produce Archive miniatures until it also went out of business in 1987. Center Stage Miniatures occasionally re-released some Archive miniatures until its demise in 2015.

== Reception ==
In the April–May 1978 edition of White Dwarf (Issue #6), John Norris was impressed by Archive's Middle Earth line, saying, "The monsters are ideal for a DM using figures, and the Middle Earth range is a source of fine, if rather large, personality figures. The hobbits and the dwarf will fit in fairly well with the Heritage/Asgard size of figure, and I recommend the former in particular to anyone using Heritage hobbits as rank and file."

Archive Miniatures were often featured in the pages of Dragon in its first few years.

- In the April 1977 edition (Issue #6), four Archive miniatures from the D&D line — two blink dogs, a rust monster and an owl bear — were included in the photographic essay "From the Fantasy Forge". The accompanying text was complimentary: "All three castings are well done and detailed, and would make good additions to anyone's monster table."
- In the August 1979 edition (Issue 28), Phil Neuscheler had a problem with many of Archive's miniatures, saying, "Fantasy Figures are generally good, but are often afflicted by stubbed hands that appear leprous." He did compliment certain lines, saying, "Archive is especially excellent for the following: Griffons, Centaurs, and Pegasus."
- Archive's miniatures made regular appearances in Dragon's "Fantasy Forge" column, including September 1977/Issue #9 (11 miniatures from their Star Wars line), October 1977/Issue 10, February 1978/Issue 12, and June 1978/Issue 15.
