= Caliban (Arduin dungeon) =

1979 short story and gaming module by David A. Hargrave

- Caliban cover (by Greg Espinoza)
- Designers: David A. Hargrave
- Publishers: Grimoire Games
- Publication: 1979
- Genres: Fantasy
- Systems: Arduin

Caliban (also known as Arduin Dungeon Number One) was a standalone short story and gaming module written in 1979 by David A. Hargrave and published by Grimoire Games. It was based upon Hargrave's gaming system known as Arduin. It is the first of only four standalone "dungeon" books created by Hargrave as an extension of his Arduin Multiverse, which at the time of Caliban's publication was known as The Arduin Trilogy.

== Setting ==
Arduin Dungeon No. 1: Caliban is an adventure scenario for player characters of levels 8 and higher, a four-level dungeon containing both new monsters and magic items, and the package includes four maps.

At 25 pages long, Caliban contained maps with room descriptions and trap matrices, four full dungeon/tower levels with maps and room descriptions (one level is an intricate cavern system), eight pocket sized magic artifact cards and eight illustrated monster cards with statistics. The package also contained a set of 16 unique creature and treasure cards, which could be detached and used in-game and 26 unique new traps in a matrix at the rear of the module.

Cover art was contributed by Greg Espinoza.

== System ==
While specifically designed for use with the Arduin gaming system, Caliban was usable with any D&D-derived RPG system. The module was recommended for characters level 12 or higher (in the Arduin universe).

== History ==
Arduin Dungeon No. 1: Caliban was written by David A. Hargrave, with art by Greg Espinoza, and was published by Grimoire Games in 1979 as a 25-page book with two cardstock sheets.

Shannon Appelcline identified Arduin Dungeon #1: Caliban (1979) as Grimoire's first original publication, appearing very early in 1979, and "authored by none other than Dave Hargrave himself. Though he wasn't planning to write any more rules for Arduin, Hargrave was happy to design some adventures that showed how his game worked—and Caliban was the first."

Caliban was originally published by Grimoire Games and went out of print in 1986. In 2002 reprints of Caliban were made available from Emperor's Choice Games and Miniatures, but were discontinued in August 2006. Since then, the company folded Caliban and all other Arduin dungeon modules into a single publication called "Vaults of the Weaver".

== Reception ==
Mike Gunderloy reviewed Caliban for Different Worlds magazine and stated that "All in all, I find Caliban to be an exciting place to adventure and would recommend it to anyone who wants to see a piece of the Arduin universe. I think that its main fault is that it is a dungeon, with the usual problem of dungeons—there seems to be no clearcut reason why all the monsters haven't already trashed one another. Still, if you suspend your disbelief of this point, as is usually done in D&D, it is a fun place to visit—but I surely wouldn't want to live there!"

== See also ==
- The Howling Tower: Arduin Dungeon Number Two
- The Citadel of Thunder: Arduin Dungeon Number Three
- Death Heart: Arduin Dungeon Number Four
