= David A. Hargrave =

American role-playing game designer (1946–1988)

- Hargrave, c. 1987
- Born: May 25, 1946
- Died: August 29, 1988 (aged 42)
- Resting place: Golden Gate National Cemetery
- Occupation: Writer
- Writing career
- Genres: Fantasy, science fiction, RPG
- Notable work: The Arduin Trilogy

David Allen Hargrave (May 25, 1946 – August 29, 1988), known as The Dream Weaver, was a prolific and sometimes controversial American game designer and writer of fantasy and science fiction role-playing games (RPGs). Hargrave's most notable written works were based upon his own mythical world of Arduin.

== Military service ==
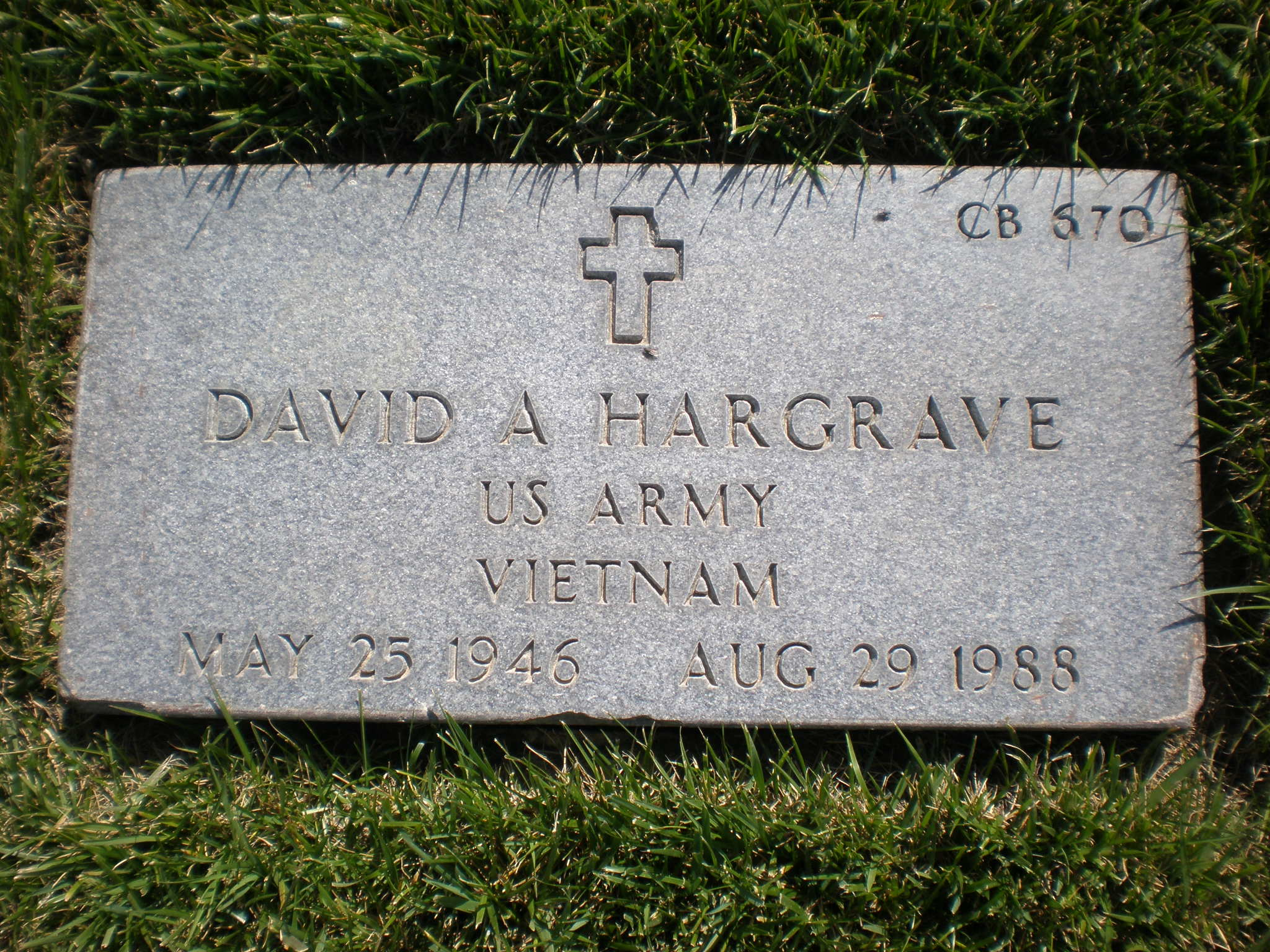
David A. Hargrave's Golden Gate National Cemetery grave marker

Hargrave served in the United States Army during the Vietnam War for six years, serving from August 28, 1964, through August 20, 1970. While in Vietnam, Hargrave regularly served as a combat photographer, often in the line of fire.

== Role playing games ==
=== Arduin ===
From the mid-1970s through 1988 Hargrave was very active in the role-playing community. He authored ten books based upon his Arduin game world. Hargrave also produced four Arduin Dungeon Modules and several fantasy item collections, which were published by Grimoire Games. Hargrave originally submitted his Arduin Grimoire to Greg Stafford's publishing house Chaosium, in 1977, but Stafford rejected it as too derivative of Dungeons & Dragons. Hargrave wound up self-publishing Arduin before having it published over the years at small press companies: The aforementioned Grimoire Games, then later Dragon Tree Press, and finally Emperors Choice Games.

=== Historical context ===
Hargrave's work was perhaps the first "cross-genre" venture into fantasy RPG, and it included everything from interstellar wars to horror and historical drama. His work was, however, based principally upon the medieval fantasy genre. Arduin was in fact one of the earliest challengers to TSR's Dungeons & Dragons, and a leading representative of the high-entropy, multiversal campaigns then prevalent in RPG circles of the era.

=== Controversy ===
While Hargrave was considered one of the best Gamemasters, he was also known for having a somewhat volatile personality. The original role-playing community at large was split between love and mere tolerance of Hargrave's passions (his falling-out with Greg Stafford, which resulted in Hargrave naming a spell after him as revenge, is one such example.)

=== Other works ===
Hargrave also frequently contributed to various magazines such as Different Worlds, Alarums and Excursions, and Abyss. As a game designer, he authored various Call of Cthulhu adventures for Chaosium, Inc., and was an integral part of the design team for the sci-fi game Star Rovers, among others.

=== Multiversal Trading Company ===
Around 1979, Hargrave operated a game store in Concord, California, called Multiversal Trading Company.

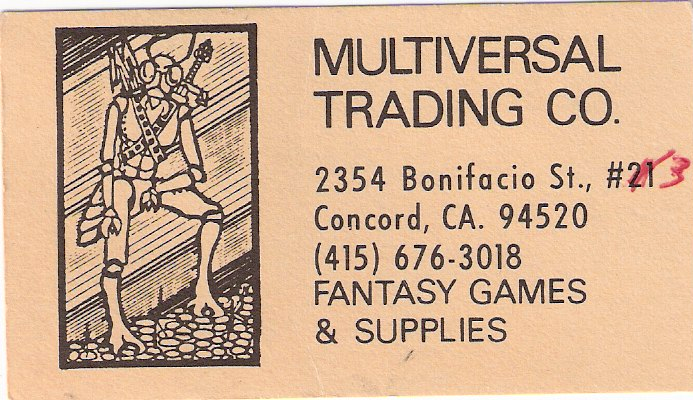
Business card for Hargrave's store.

== Personal life ==
He was married to Brigitte Hargrave. For years, Hargrave had suffered a heart disability with diabetic complications. He died in his sleep August 29, 1988.

== Bibliography ==
- The Arduin Grimoire (Arduin Grimoire Volume 1)
- Welcome to Skull Tower (Arduin Grimoire Volume 2)
- The Runes of Doom (Arduin Grimoire Volume 3)
- The Lost Grimoire (Arduin Grimoire Volume 4)
- Dark Dreams (Arduin Grimoire Volume 5)
- The House of the Rising Sun (Arduin Grimoire Volume 6)
- Shadow Lands (Arduin Grimoire Volume 7)
- The Winds of Chance (Arduin Grimoire Volume 8)
- The Arduin Adventure
- Arduin Dungeon No. 1: Caliban
- Arduin Dungeon No. 2: The Howling Tower
- Arduin Dungeon No. 3: The Citadel of Thunder
- Arduin Dungeon No. 4: Death Heart
- The Arduin Primer
- The Compleat Arduin Book 1 The Rules
- The Compleat Arduin Book 2 Resources
- The Arduin Map
- Vaults of the 'Weaver
- The Black Grimoire
- End War (Arduin Grimoire Volume 9)
- World of Khaas the Legendary Lands of Arduin
- The Book of the Shining Land
- The Book of Dreams of Lost Sardath
- Lancer's Rest
- Black Devil Mountain (found in The Asylum and Other Tales from Chaosium)
- Dark Carnival (found in Curse of the Chthonians from Chaosium)
- Arduin Bloody Arduin (found in Different Worlds magazine issue #2)
- All the Worlds' Monsters Volumes 1, 2 and 3 (from Chaosium).
- Star Rovers Module 1 (Sci-Fi RPG from Archive Miniatures and Game Systems, 1981)
