= Cat Tobin =

Irish publisher and game designer

- Education: BA in English and Philosophy
- Occupations: Game designer; Co-owner of Pelgrane Press
- Writing career
- Notable awards: National Game Writers Award from Itzacon Eire in 2008

Cathriona "Cat" Tobin is a game designer and publisher based in West Cork, Ireland. She co-owns the London-based Pelgrane Press with Simon J Rogers and is a significant contributor to the roleplaying game industry in the UK.

== Career ==
Tobin has a Bachelor of Arts degree in English and Philosophy.

She has contributed to the game community in Ireland and the UK for many years and worked with Warpcon from 1997 to 2006 in roles including event organiser, committee member and president. She is also a co-founder of K2 (originally in Killarney, now Dungarvan), and was one of the Dragonmeet organizers in 2013. She also wrote for indie game publications such as The Circular and The Gazebo, where she contributed "Five Tips for Writing a Mystery Game" in 2012.

Tobin held a position with Contested Ground Studios as an accountant, also working as booth staff at conventions. She began working for Pelgrane Press as an assistant publisher and program manager, working her way up to become co-owner and managing director in 2015. This position includes running the day-to-day operations of Stone Skin Press, Pelgrane's book imprint. Tobin has diverse credits, including publisher, editor, project manager, and "wrangler" on a number of projects. Tobin has over 100 production credits, such as Cold City (2007), Hillfolk (2013), and several games in each of the GUMSHOE, 13th Age, and Trail of Cthulhu series.

Pelgrane, under Tobin's leadership, has run several successful Kickstarter campaigns, including raising $120,000 for The Dracula Dossier, an improvisational supplement to their game Night's Black Agents, and a £167,341 Kickstarter for the Yellow King RPG.

Tobin wrote and designed the game First Joyful Mystery, a roleplaying game that explores the politics of abortion and women's rights in Ireland. The game was included in the #Feminism game anthology, a collection of 34 "nano-games" that was selected for the 2016 IndieCade Showcase at E3, and nominated to IndieCade 2016.

Tobin has been called a "rising star of RPG publishing":

Since joining Pelgrane, the company has seen the number of events it runs at Gen Con skyrocket from fewer than 10 to over 150. The company had a $120,000 Kickstarter, and won 15 ENnies, all while Tobin “worked hard to build a Pelgrane community that engages fans, and acknowledges the vital part they play…in our team,” she says.

As an industry professional, Tobin is often consulted for advice on how to get into the industry, and editorial advice on how to write successful games. Tobin has said that one of her professional goals is to improve the network of women making games in the UK, has spoken up about gender-based harassment and discrimination in the industry, and contributes to discussions about diversity and inclusion. She is involved in Christina Stiles of Misfit Studios' book project Medusa's Guide for Gamer Girls as a contributing writer.

== Accomplishments ==
Tobin won the Contribution to Irish Gaming Award from Warpcon in 2005, and a National Game Writers Award from Itzacon Eire in 2008.

She organised the 2006 Warpcon fundraising efforts including its charity auction, which raised €12,000. This contributed to Warpcon and the Irish Games Association jointly winning the 2006 Diana Jones Award, for "Irish Game Convention Charity Auctions."

In 2013, she was an invited guest at the UK Games Expo. Also in 2013, Pelgrane-published Hillfolk won Indie Game of the Year and Best Support from the Indie RPG Awards, and in 2014 it won the Diana Jones Award, where it was described as "created by some of the finest designers working today."

Since Tobin's involvement with Pelgrane Press, the games manufacturer has won a large number of awards, including the Gen Con En World ENnies silver Fan's Choice for Best Publisher. It has been nominated for several Golden Geek Awards and won an Indie Groundbreaker Award.

She edited and art-directed the Seven Wonders game anthology, a "must-have," "cutting-edge," and "amazing" set of games noted for its "strong art" and "incredibly smart editing." It won the 2017 Game of the Year Indie Groundbreaker Award from the Indie Game Developer Network.
