= Trail of Cthulhu =

Lovecraftian horror tabletop role-playing game

- Cover art by Jérôme Huguenin
- Designers: Kenneth Hite, Robin Laws, Jérôme Huguenin, Simon J Rogers
- Publishers: Pelgrane Press
- Publication: March 2008
- Genres: Investigative horror
- Systems: Gumshoe System

Trail of Cthulhu is an investigative horror role-playing game published by Pelgrane Press in 2008 in which the players' characters investigate mysterious events related to the Cthulhu Mythos. The game is a licensed product based on the horror role playing game Call of Cthulhu published by Chaosium, which is itself based on the writings of H. P. Lovecraft.

== Setting ==
Trail of Cthulhu is set during the 1930s, featuring fictional characters and locations (such as Professor Armitage and Arkham), and with the ever-present and menacing Cthulhu Mythos in the background. Horrid monsters lurk in dark and forgotten places, while fiendish cults worship Great Old Ones and Outer Gods through blasphemous rituals. Ordinary people that are drawn into and forced to confront this world of mystery and horror risk not only their physical well-being, but their mental health as well.

The game supports two styles of play, though their elements are fully interchangeable. The Purist mode sets ordinary people against the power of the Mythos and forces far more powerful than mere mortals. In the Pulp mode, characters are heroes in the mold of Indiana Jones, and for them, nothing is impossible.

== Character generation ==
Each player creates a character and chooses an occupation from the list provided. Each occupation provides a special ability that is not available to other occupations.

From a pool of Build Points, the player buys abilities. The character's occupation allows the player to buy certain related abilities at a lower cost. For example, Medicine would cost less to a doctor than to a professor.

In Purist mode, Health and Stability cannot exceed 12, and player characters do not receive new build points after a scenario is completed.

The rules suggest that in Pulp mode, that the pool of Build Points be increased to allow for more heroic characters. Also in Pulp mode, at the end of each scenario, characters receive two new Build Points to be assigned to any ability.

=== Drive, Stability and Sanity ===
In the face of incomprehensible horror, a character's sanity is always an issue. Each player character has Drive, a motivation that keeps him or her going where normal people would have given up in the face of horror. Player characters that act against their Drives will lose Stability, while player characters that follow their Drives will refresh lost Stability.

Sanity is a long-term measurement of a character's mental health. For each 3 full rating points in Sanity, a character must have one Pillar of Sanity; a human concern that he or she believes and trusts in.

In Purist style play, lost Sanity is never refreshed, while Pulp style may allow player characters to refresh some Sanity if they successfully complete scenarios.

=== Magic ===
Trail of Cthulhu introduces a magic system to the GUMSHOE System, but using magic will quickly drain away a player character's Stability.

== Gameplay ==
The game uses the Gumshoe System, developed by Robin Laws of Pelgrane Press and previously used in The Esoterrorists (2006) and Fear Itself (2007).

In this system, investigation skills do not require a die roll; the Investigator simply announces that they will use a skill they possess for a certain purpose, and the Keeper tells the player what clue they have learned. For example, an Investigator can announce they will use their Medicine skill to perform an autopsy, and the Keeper tells the doctor that the victim died of poison. If a player feels there is still more to be learned, they can spend Skill points to see if there are additional secondary clues at the scene. For example, the doctor who performed the autopsy spends Skill points and learns that the poison is a rare neurotoxin only recently discovered by an expedition to the Amazon jungle led by Professor Roscoe T. Abernathy of Arkham University.

The game is largely based on a narrative approach, with dialogue between Investigators and the Keeper determining how the story unfolds.

Situations requiring physical actions, which includes combat, are resolved by rolling dice against target numbers or opposed rolls.

Trail of Cthulhu provides guidelines for adapting Chaosium's large catalogue of Call of Cthulhu adventures to the Gumshoe System.

== Publication history ==
Call of Cthulhu, the popular horror roleplaying game based on the writings of H.P. Lovecraft, was published by Chaosium in 1981. In the first decade of the 21st century, Kenneth Hite designed a Cthulhu Mythos game using the Gumshoe System. The result was Trail of Cthulhu, which was published by Pelgrane Press in 2008 "by arrangement with Chaosium."

Pelgrane Press followed up with a large number of scenarios, adventures and supplements.

In September 2023, Pelgrane Press announced Hite and Gareth Ryder-Hanrahan would collaborate on a second edition.

== Awards ==
- Trail of Cthulhu received two Silver ENnie Awards for "Best Rules of 2008" and "Best Writing of 2008", as well as an honorary mention for "Best Product of 2008."
- Trail of Cthulhu won the 2010 "Lucca Games Best of Show" (Italy)
- The Armitage Files received a Silver ENnie for "Best Adventure of 2010."
- Bookhounds of London received a Silver ENnie for "Best Cartography of 2011."
- The Book of the Smoke – The Investigator's Guide to Occult London received a Gold ENnie for "Best Writing of 2012"
- Cthulhu Apocalypse: The Apocalypse Machine received a Gold ENnie for "Best Electronic Book of 2012."

== Reception ==
In the 2011 book Designers & Dragons, game historian Shannon Appelcline noted, "Trail of Cthulhu was released as a handsome hardcover volume, over twice as long as either of the previous Gumshoe games. Two-toned printing and beautiful gray-scale artwork helped to make Trail of Cthulhu one of the most attractive and notable books that Pelgrane had ever produced."

In Wired, M.J. Harnish wrote, "I think it manages to capture the feel Lovecraft's stories, particularly when played in Purist mode, with rules built to complement the stories. GUMSHOE is a perfect fit for investigating the supernatural mysteries and horrors associated with the Cthulhu Mythos. It also is simple enough to be run in a more 'off-the-cuff' improvisational style and doesn't require a great deal of prep on the part of the GM, an important consideration for those of us with busy lives." Hanish concluded, "In the end, Trail of Cthulhu is a roleplaying game I would highly recommend to anyone who is interested in Lovecraft's stories, or horror investigation in general. The game's system, setting, and supplemental material all work together to create an interesting and thoroughly compelling world to explore."

In The Unspeakable Oath, reviewer Matthew Pook concluded, "The publication of Trail of Cthulhu raises the question, “Why effectively rewrite Call of Cthulhu?” Well, the latter is almost 30 years old and for all its core elegance, its age shows. The presentation of stats for its Mythos menagerie is almost Dungeons & Dragons-like. And by modern gaming standards it fails to address fully the tasks of both players and Keeper. [...] Trail of Cthulhu is a harsher, grainier approach to Lovecraftian investigative horror. Fully supported by elegant mechanics, it opens up a whole new decade and restores the unknown of Lovecraft's Mythos. Ten phobias."

In his 2023 book Monsters, Aliens, and Holes in the Ground, RPG historian Stu Horvath commented on the new and improved sanity system in this game compared to older Cthulhu mechanisms, saying, "All of this [new] mechanical nuance demonstrates an awareness of sanity mechanics that were developed in the years following Call of Cthulhu, particularly Unknown Armies. They all lead to the same place — mental trauma and irrevocable insanity — but they arrive using systems that attempt to connect these consequences to the intrinsic qualities of the characters they affect, rather than just rolling for a new mental illness on a random chart."

== Other reviews and commentary ==
- Pyramid

== Products ==
- Trail of Cthulhu – The core rules, including material on the 1930s setting and the Cthulhu Mythos, by Kenneth Hite.
- Stunning Eldritch Tales – 4 scenarios, most in Pulp style, by Robin D. Laws.
- Trail of Cthulhu Player’s Guide – The core rules, without setting material.
- Keeper’s Screen with Keepers Resource Book – Rules summary and additional material for abilities and occupations, by Simon Carryer.
- Four Shadows – Music for Trail of Cthulhu, by James Semple.
- Shadows Over Filmland – The Backlot Gothic setting and 12 scenarios, by Kenneth Hite and Robin D. Laws.
- Arkham Detective Tales – 4 scenarios and a campaign frame, by Gareth Ryder-Hanrahan.
- Rough Magicks – Expanded setting and rules for magic in Trail of Cthulhu, by Kenneth Hite.
- The Armitage Files – A campaign with tips focused on improvisation, by Robin D. Laws.
- Cthulhu Apocalypse – A series of publications with rules and scenarios for a post-apocalyptic setting, by Graham Walmsley.
- Eternal Lies – An epic campaign by Will Hindmarch and Jeff Tidball with Jeremy Kelle.
- Eternal Lies Suite – Music for a Trail of Cthulhu campaign, by James Semple.
- Bookhounds of London – Setting material and campaign frame games set in 1930s London and a scenario, by Kenneth Hite.
- Out of Time – 4 scenarios previously released as pdf, set outside the 1930s setting, by Adam Gauntlett, Jason Morningstar, and Bill White.
- The Book of the Smoke – The Investigator's Guide to Occult London – Setting material for London, by Paula Dempsey.
- The Book of the New Jerusalem – follow-up to The Book of the Smoke. An occult gazetteer for the rest of England, by Paula Dempsey.
- Out of Space – 5 scenarios previously released as pdf, by Adam Gauntlett, Jason Morningstar, and Robin D. Laws.
- The Final Revelation – 4 Purist style scenarios, by Graham Walmsley. Also contains a framing scenario by Scott Dorward.
- Cthulhu City – An alternative urban setting, by Gareth Ryder-Hanrahan
- Hideous Creatures: A Bestiary of the Cthulhu Mythos – write-ups of 31 Mythos creatures by Kenneth Hite, Gareth Ryder-Hanrahan, Becky Annison, Helen Gould, and Ruth Tillman
- Fearful Symmetries – A campaign setting written by Steve Dempsey and inspired by folklore and the work of William Blake.

== Sources ==
- Hite, K. (2008). Trail of Cthulhu. Pelgrane Press. ISBN 978-1-934859-07-0.
