= 2013 ENnie Award winners =

- Awarded for: Best role-playing games of previous year
- Country: United Kingdom & United States
- Presented by: Gen Con
- First award: 2001
- Website: Archive of 2013 ENNIE Awards

The following are the winners of the 13th annual ENnie Awards, held in 2013:

== Judges' Spotlight Winners ==
- Hooper – Leviathans (Catalyst Game Labs)
- Matthew Muth – School Daze (Sand & Steam Productions)
- Jakud Nowosad – Deniable Asset (Random Encounters)
- Megan Robertson – Killshot: Director's Cut (Broken Ruler Games)
- Kurt Wiegel – Eldritch Skies (Battlefield Press, Inc.)

== List of gold and silver winners ==
Category	Gold Winner	Silver Winner
Best Adventure	Pathfinder: Rise of the Runelords Anniversary Edition (Paizo Publishing)	Achtung! Cthulhu – Three Kings (Chronicle City/Modiphius Entertainment)
Best Aid/Accessory	Night's Watch (Green Ronin)	The Unspeakable Oath (Arc Dream Publishing)
Best Art, Cover	Iron Kingdoms (Privateer Press)	NPC Codex (Paizo Publishing)
Best Art, Interior	Shadows of Esteren Book 1 (Agate Editions)	Ed Greenwood Presents Elminster's Forgotten Realms (Wizards of the Coast)
Best Blog	Gnome Stew	The Illuminerdy
Best Cartography	The Lands of Ice and Fire (Random House)	Sprawl Sites: High Society and Low Life (Catalyst Game Labs)
Best Electronic Book	Deadlands Reloaded: The Last Sons (Pinnacle Entertainment)	Hobomancer (Hex Games)
Best Family Game	Doctor Who: Adventures in Time & Space—11th Doctor Edition (Cubicle 7)	Hero Kids—Fantasy RPG (Hero Forge Games)
Best Free Game	Mazes and Perils RPG (WG Productions)	Silent Memories (Morning Skye Studio)
Best Free Product	Wayfinder #8 (Paizo Fans United)	Shadowrun Quick-Start Rules (Catalyst Game Labs)
Best Game	Iron Kingdoms (Privateer Press)	Night's Black Agents (Pelgrane Press)
Best Miniature	Pathfinder Bestiary Box (Paizo Publishing)	Pathfinder Battles: Shattered Star Gargantuan Blue Dragon (WizKid Games/NECA)
Best Monster/Adversary	NPC Codex (Paizo Publishing)	Inner Sea Bestiary (Paizo Publishing)
Best Podcast	TableTop: Dragon Age	Haste: The Official Obsidian Portal Podcast
Best Production Values	Shadows of Esteren Book 1 (Agate Editions)	Iron Kingdoms (Privateer Press)
Best RPG Related Product	Kobold Guide to Worldbuilding (Kobold Press)	The Lands of Ice and Fire (Random House)
Best Rules	Dungeon World (Sage Kobold Productions)	Iron Kingdoms (Privateer Press)
Best Setting	Magnimar: City of Monuments (Paizo Publishing)	Mythic Iceland (BRP/Chaosium)
Best Software	Roll20 (The Orr Group, LLC)	The Crawler's Companion (Purple Sorcerer Games)
Best Supplement	Shadowrun 2050 (Catalyst Game Labs)	Doctor Who: The Time Traveler's Companion (Cubicle 7)
Best Website	Gnome Stew	The Escapist
Best Writing	Kobold Guide to Worldbuilding (Kobold Press)	Night's Black Agents (Pelgrane Press)
Product of the Year	NPC Codex (Paizo Publishing)	Shadows of Esteren Book 1 (Agate Editions)
Fans’ Choice for Favorite Publisher	Paizo Publishing	Goodman Games
