= 2012 ENnie Award winners =

- Awarded for: Best role-playing games of previous year
- Country: United Kingdom & United States
- Presented by: Gen Con
- First award: 2001
- Website: Archive of 2012 ENNIE Awards

The following are the winners of the 12th annual ENnie Awards, held in 2012:

== Judges' Spotlight Winners ==
- Designers & Dragons (Mongoose Publishing)
- Edge RPG (Outrider Studios)
- Honor + Intrigue (Basic Action Games)
- Shelter In Place (Galileo Games)
- Technoir (Cellar Games LLC)

== List of gold and silver winners ==
Category	Gold Winner	Silver Winner
Best Adventure	Streets of Zobeck (Open Design)	Madness at Gardmore Abbey (Wizards of the Coast)
Best Aid/Accessory	Masks: 1,000 Memorable NPCs for Any RPG (Engine Publishing)	GameMastery Chase Cards (Paizo Publishing)
Best Art, Cover	Pathfinder Roleplaying Game Beginner Box (Paizo)	Cthulhu by Gaslight (Chaosium Inc.)
Best Art, Interior	The One Ring: Adventures Over the Edge of the Wild (Cubicle 7)	Dragon Age: Set 2 (Green Ronin)
Best Blog	Gnome Stew	Gaming as Women
Best Cartography	Pathfinder Campaign Setting: Jade Regent Map Folio (Paizo)	Madness at Gardmore Abbey (Wizards of the Coast)
Best Electronic Book	Cthulhu Apocalypse: The Apocalypse Machine (Graham Walmsley & Pelgrane Press)	GURPS Social Engineering (Steve Jackson Games)
Best Free Product	Pathfinder Module: We Be Goblins! (Paizo)	The One Ring: Words of the Wise (Cubicle 7)
Best Game	Savage Worlds Deluxe (Pinnacle Entertainment Group)	Marvel Heroic Roleplaying Basic Game (Margaret Weis Productions)
Best Miniatures Product	Pathfinder Battles: Heroes and Monsters (Paizo)	Dungeons and Dragons Dragon Collector’s Set (Wizards of the Coast)
Best Monster/Adversary	DC Adventures: Heroes & Villains, Vol. 1 (Green Ronin)	Monster Vault: Threats to the Nentir Vale (Wizards of the Coast)
Best Podcast	Role Playing Public Radio	Haste – The Official Obsidian Portal Podcast
Best Production Values	Pathfinder Roleplaying Game Beginner Box (Paizo)	The One Ring: Adventures Over the Edge of the Wild (Cubicle 7)
Best RPG Related Product	Complete Kobold Guide to Game Design (Open Design)	Lords of Waterdeep (Wizards of the Coast)
Best Rules	Marvel Heroic Roleplaying Basic Game (Margaret Weis Productions)	Lorefinder—The Pathfinder / GUMSHOE Mashup (Pelgrane Press)
Best Setting	Cthulhu Britannica: Shadows Over Scotland (Cubicle 7)	Ashen Stars (Pelgrane Press)
Best Supplement	Cthulhu by Gaslight (Chaosium Inc.)	GURPS Horror, Fourth Edition (Steve Jackson Games)
Best Website	Pathfinder Wiki	Obsidian Portal
Best Writing	The Investigator’s Guide to Occult London (Pelgrane Press) by Paula Dempsey	GURPS Horror, Fourth Edition (Steve Jackson Games)
Product of the Year	Pathfinder Roleplaying Game Beginner Box (Paizo)	Marvel Heroic Roleplaying Basic Game (Margaret Weis Productions)
Fan’s Favorite Publisher	Paizo Publishing	Evil Hat Productions
