= Eternal Lies =

Role-playing game

- Cover by Jérôme Huguenin
- Designers: Will Hindmarch, Jeremy Kelle, Jeff Tidball
- Publishers: Pelgrane Press
- Publication: 2013; 12 years ago
- Genres: Horror
- Systems: Gumshoe

Eternal Lies is a 2013 role-playing game adventure campaign by Will Hindmarch and Jeff Tidball with Jeremy Kelle, published by Pelgrane Press for Trail of Cthulhu.

== Contents ==
Eternal Lies is a massive campaign in the tradition of Masks of Nyarlathotep. The print edition was also published in a special pre-release bundle with the soundtrack album by James Semple and a PDF.

== Reception ==
John O'Neill reviewed Eternal Lies for Black Gate, and stated that "Eternal Lies maintains the extremely high standards of the previous adventures. There are a number of excellent twists and turns in the story, as the players confront a worldwide cult and the alien forces behind it and take on an escalating quest to save humanity. There's a lot of material here, but the writing is top notch and the book is a real pleasure to read."

Justin Alexander reviewed it on his blog, The Alexandrian, calling it "an amazing campaign[….] Despite the incredibly high esteem in which I hold the Masks of Nyarlathotep, however, I’m of the opinion that Eternal Lies is even better."

Eternal Lies won the 2014 Gold ENnie Awards for Best Adventure and the Silver ENnie for Best Production Values.
