= 2015 ENnie Award winners =

- Awarded for: Best role-playing games of previous year
- Country: United Kingdom & United States
- Presented by: Gen Con
- First award: 2001
- Website: Archive of 2015 ENNIE Awards

The following are the winners of the 15th annual ENnie Awards, held in 2015:

== Judges' Spotlight Winners ==
- Dragons in the Stacks: A Teen Librarian’s Guide to Tabletop Role-Playing (Libraries Unlimited) – Annah Madrinan
- Wicked Lies and Alibis (Imaginary Empire) – Stacy Muth
- Posthuman Pathways (Genesis of Legend Publishing) – Jakub Nowosad
- Firefly Echoes of War: Thrillin' Heroics (Margaret Weis Productions) – Kayra Keri Küpçü
- East Texas University (Pinnacle Entertainment Group) – Kurt Wiegel

== List of gold and silver winners ==
| Category | Gold Winner | Silver Winner |
|---|---|---|
| Best Adventure | Horror on the Orient Express (Chaosium) | A Red & Pleasant Land (Lamentations of the Flame Princess) |
| Best Aid/Accessory | Dungeons & Dragons Dungeon Masters Screen (Wizards of the Coast) | Black Green Call of Cthulhu 7th Edition RPG Dice Set (Q-Workshop) |
| Best Cover Art | The Rise of Tiamat (Wizards of the Coast) | Achtung! Cthulhu: Terrors of the Secret War (Modiphius Entertainment Ltd) |
| Best Interior Art | Dungeons & Dragons Monster Manual (Wizards of the Coast) | The Strange (Monte Cook Games, LLC) |
| Best Blog | ConTessa Tabletop Gaming by Women for Everyone | Gnome Stew |
| Best Cartography | Ninth World Guidebook (Monte Cook Games, LLC) | The Guide to Glorantha (Moon Design Publications) |
| Best Electronic Book | Basic Rules for Dungeons & Dragons (Wizards of the Coast) | Ken Writes About Stuff Volume 2 (Pelgrane Press) |
| Best Family Game | Dungeons & Dragons Starter Set (Wizards of the Coast) | Atomic Robo The Roleplaying Game (Evil Hat Productions) |
| Best Free Product | Basic Rules for Dungeons & Dragons (Wizards of the Coast) | 13th Age The Archmages Orrery (Pelgrane Press) |
| Best Game | Dungeons & Dragons Players Handbook (Wizards of the Coast) | The Strange (Monte Cook Games, LLC) |
| Best Miniatures Product | Dungeons & Dragons Icons of the Realms Elemental Evil Boosters (WizKids) | Pathfinder Pawns Inner Sea Pawn Box (Paizo Inc.) |
| Best Monster/Adversary | Dungeons & Dragons Monster Manual (Wizards of the Coast) | Achtung! Cthulhu: Terrors of the Secret War (Modiphius Entertainment Ltd) |
| Best Podcast | Ken and Robin Talk About Stuff | Miskatonic University Podcast |
| Best Production Values | Dungeons & Dragons Starter Set (Wizards of the Coast) | Horror on the Orient Express (Chaosium) |
| Best RPG Related Product | Designers & Dragons: A History of the Roleplaying Game Industry (Evil Hat Productions) | Temple of Elemental Evil (WizKids) |
| Best Rules | Dungeons & Dragons Players Handbook (Wizards of the Coast) | MUTANT Year Zero The Roleplaying Game (Modiphius Entertainment Ltd) |
| Best Setting | A Red & Pleasant Land (Lamentations of the Flame Princess) | The Strange (Monte Cook Games, LLC) |
| Best Software | Roll20 (Roll 20) | HeroLab (Lone Wolf Development) |
| Best Supplement | Dungeons & Dragons Dungeon Masters Guide (Wizards of the Coast) | Pathfinder RPG: Pathfinder Unchained (Paizo Inc.) |
| Best Website | The Escapist | Tabletop Audio |
| Best Writing | A Red & Pleasant Land by Zak S (Lamentations of the Flame Princess) | D&D Player's Handbook by Jeremy Crawford, James Wyatt, Robert J. Schwalb, Bruce R. Cordell (Wizards of the Coast) |
| Fan's Choice for Best Publisher | Wizards of the Coast | Paizo Inc |
| Product Of The Year | Dungeons & Dragons Players Handbook (Wizards of the Coast) | A Red & Pleasant Land (Lamentations of the Flame Princess) |
