= The Excellent Prismatic Spray =

Role-playing game periodical

Cover of Issue 1 (December 2000), artwork by Ralph Horsley

The Excellent Prismatic Spray is a magazine devoted to the fantasy role-playing game Dying Earth and the author Jack Vance on whose works the game is based. The magazine is published intermittently by Pelgrane Press and is named for one of the spells used by various wizards in the Dying Earth stories.

== Publication history ==
From 1950 to 1984, the science fiction and fantasy author Jack Vance wrote four Dying Earth books, all set in the distant future when the sun is almost exhausted and magic has asserted itself as a dominant force. In 2001, Pelgrane Press published a licensed role-playing game based on Vance's setting. To provide supplementary material for the game, Pelgrane published the first issue of The Excellent Prismatic Spray in December 2000. Two issues followed in 2001, a double issue in 2003, Number 6 in 2004, and after a four-year hiatus, another double issue in 2008.

In the 2014 book Designers & Dragons, game historian Shannon Appelcline noted that Pelgrane provided good support for The Dying Earth Roleplaying Game through 2008: "That support began with eight issues of Pelgrane's Dying Earth magazine, The Excellent Prismatic Spray (2000–2008), which featured articles by RPG luminaries like Keith Baker, Monte Cook, Ed Greenwood, Gary Gygax, and Phil Masters. One or two Dying Earth supplements also appeared every year, except 2004 and 2005. This included plenty of setting books and some books intended to support the higher levels of play: Turjan's Tome of Beauty and Horror (2003) and Rhialto's Book of Marvels (2006). Starting in 2005, Pelgrane also began publishing PDFs for the game, which allowed them to produce more adventures – which previously appeared mostly within The Excellent Prismatic Spray."

== Reception ==
In a review of The Dying Earth Roleplaying Game in Black Gate, John ONeill said "Much of the content of the magazine and the additional support material were written in studied imitation of Vance's witty and erudite style, and made terrific reading."

Writing for The Guild Companion, Nicholas Caldwell reviewed the third issue of the magazine, published in 2001, and was impressed by it, calling it "a masterful addition to the series and well worth the terces." He liked the tongue-in-cheek "in-character advertisements for goods and services for sale or sought on the Dying Earth" and also found both the artwork and the writing style struck the right note, saying that it was "handsomely illustrated by fine cover and interior artwork, and with respectful emulation of the Vancian prose style and humor." He concluded, "Instruct your factor to purchase a copy before the sun goes out!"
