= Night's Black Agents (role-playing game) =

Tabletop horror role-playing game

Night's Black Agents is a role-playing game created by Kenneth Hite and published by Pelgrane Press in 2012.

== Description ==
Night's Black Agents is one of the games to use the GUMSHOE System. The story is a vampire spy thriller, and concerns characters who are secret agents that discover and confront a vampiric conspiracy.

The rules vary slightly to straight GUMSHOE to better fit the genres involved. There are special combat and chase rules to reflect the action-adventure espionage techno-thriller genre that provides its backdrop. There are also trust and betrayal rules to reflect the "black mindset" of covert operations.

=== Background ===
The Night's Black Agents world book has no fixed game world. The Director generates the origin of the vampires, which vampire tropes work, which do not, the extent of their conspiracy, and how much pull they have over the mortal world. The players have to discover these details within each unique campaign without any preconceived knowledge or perceptions carried over from previous campaigns.

The types of vampires are divided into four major categories. The first two, supernatural (magical creatures from myth and legend), and damned (humans cursed by God or "blessed" by the Devil), resemble conventional vampires. The last two, alien (a parasitic or predatory extraterrestrial lifeform) or mutant (an evolutionary offshoot or genetically modified lifeform), are wildcards that throw the players off-balance or mislead them. There are also stats for different "species" of vampires from other cultures, like the Greek Strigoi (winged female vampires that can turn into owls) and the Ghanaian Adze (a blood-sucking fly demon).

Espionage techniques that feature in the game world are also customizable. They are divided into Dust (gritty techno-thriller), Mirrors (paranoid bluffing, double-crosses, and manipulation), Burn (pushing the characters to their mental and emotional limits until they crack), and Stakes (monster-hunting action-adventure). The Director can use one or more of them to flavor their campaign.

There is also a mechanism called the "Conspyramid". The vampire conspiracy's hierarchy and organization (the "Vampyramid") is initially unknown to the characters. They uncover nodes of the conspiracy through investigating it, gradually giving them an outside-in view of its workings. However, just like a mortal government or organization, the vampire conspiracy can use propaganda, deception, and manipulation to mislead or misdirect the characters.

=== Character creation ===
==== Abilities and backgrounds ====
Character creation is point-based. There are no character attributes like intelligence or strength; characters are based on abilities and backgrounds.

Abilities are narrow skills that cost a point a level and are split into investigative and general ability points. Having at least one point in an ability gives the character proficiency. Having eight or more points in an ability grants access to advantages called "cherries" that grant bonuses to the character's actions when using that ability.

Backgrounds are ability packages that are made up of six points of investigative abilities and 18 points of general abilities each. For instance, the bang and burn background makes the character an expert in demolitions while the wet-work background makes the character an expert assassin. They provide character guidelines for new players or quick templates for a pickup game. This speeds character creation and allows the campaign to get up and start running.

==== Investigative vs General abilities ====
Investigative points are calculated based on the number of characters in the party and can only be used to buy investigative abilities. Investigative abilities (like diagnosis, streetwise, and forensic pathology) automatically uncover clues related to that skill. The levels in the skill form a point pool that can be spent to expand upon the basic information revealed. Beginning characters can only have a maximum pool of three in each investigative skill to prevent over-specialization. Characters begin play with base scores of one in their streetwise and tradecraft investigative abilities, indicating their training and experience.

The character starts with 70 general points, which can only be used to buy general-purpose abilities. General abilities are pass-fail (like athletics, driving, or shooting). The levels in the skill form a point pool that can be spent to meet or exceed a success threshold. The success threshold is known by the Director, but is unknown to the player. This encourages a player to sometimes put extra exertion or effort into their character's actions without knowing if it will pay off.

The character's point pools regenerate differently. General combat ability pools regenerate after 24 hours if the character sleeps or rests. Investigative ability pools regenerate at the end of a break in the campaign (like at the end of an adventure or during a character's recovery-time spent in a hospital).

==== The Cover and Network general abilities ====
The Cover ability is the alternate identity or identities used by the character. Characters start with a base pool of 10, but additional levels can be bought with general character points. The character can choose to have a few really solid identities (with large point pools) or many flimsy ones (with small point pools). The pool does not refresh and restored or additional levels have to be bought with experience points. If the Cover's pool is reduced to zero, the cover is compromised and cannot be used again.

The Network ability is the character's organization of contacts, which can be used to provide information and support. Characters usually start with a base pool of 15 points. Characters in a burn-genre campaign have a lower starting base pool (4 to 12 points) that is based on the number of characters in the party. Additional levels can be bought with general character points. Each contact has a pool rating. The pool does not refresh and restored or additional levels have to be bought with experience points. If the contact's pool is reduced to zero, the contact is compromised and cannot be used again.

==== "Cherries" ====
Cherries are special bonuses that can be granted or purchased if a character has a level or pool of eight or more in an ability.

Characters with a pool of 8 or more in the Weapons or Shooting general abilities can spend 6 points per level to take Special Weapons training. This grants the character a +1 damage bonus per level when using one of two specified weapons in combat. For instance, a character with Weapons can take K-Bar knife and tonfa baton and a character with Shooting can take Walther PPK pistol and Hecker & Koch MP5 submachine gun. The bonus applies to only that specific make and model of weapon (e.g., a .38-caliber Smith & Wesson M10 revolver rather than all .38-caliber revolvers in general). However, it is also not limited to just a weapon in particular – like an uncle's old service pistol or your grandmother's heirloom nunchucks. If the specified weapon is lost, it can be replaced with an identical one (unless it is the character's symbol).

Characters with a pool of 8 or more in the Hand-to-Hand general ability can spend 6 points per level to take Martial Arts training. This grants a +1 damage bonus per level when using unarmed combat. Later supplements added unarmed-combat Cherries that granted bonuses to other abilities.

Characters can also put points into tag team bonuses. This allows two characters to work together to achieve the same goal by each contributing a specific ability to perform the action. The simplest example would be for one character to use their Notice investigative ability to act as a spotter while another character used their Shooting general ability to act as a sniper. The first character (dubbed the "winger" in the rules) is granting his Notice point as a bonus to aid the second character (dubbed the "striker" in the rules) to use his Shooting ability to hit the target. The tag team bonus can only be between those two characters and the players must both spend character points to pay for the tag team.

==== Secondary attributes ====
These are the character's gameplay-dependent qualities.

A military occupational specialty, the character's main general ability, grants the character one automatic success per session.

Health is the character's physical well-being. It has a base score of 4, but players can spend a general character point per level to raise it. (In burn-genre campaigns, the character is restricted to a maximum score of 10.) If the character suffers wounds and their current health score is above zero, he can heal back a few Health points per day of rest. A negative health level requires surgery and intensive medical care (requiring use of the diagnosis, medic, and pharmacy abilities). A health score of -12 or lower means the character has died.

Stability, the character's mental well-being, has a base score of 4 but players can spend a general character point per level to raise it. A character whose stability drops to zero or lower is shaken (too stunned to be effective) or mentally ill (gaining a permanent mental flaw). A stability score of -12 or lower means the character is incurably insane and must leave play.

Sources of Stability are three things that calm and center the character – symbol is an item, solace is a person, and safety is a place. They raise or restore the character's stability score. If they are destroyed or the character is cut off from them, the character can never replenish their stability score by that means.

Drive is the motivation that keeps the character going. Examples would be "must clear my name", "always push myself to the limit", "can't let my teammates down", or "must get revenge on my enemies".

Heat is the amount of attention the character or group is getting from the mundane authorities. Lying low and use of Tradecraft and Evasion skills lowers heat. Drawing attention to themselves through committing crimes or acts of violence that can be linked to them (or being framed for committing them) increases heat. This also affects the character's cover identities and network contacts, which lose points until they are compromised.

Trust is the confidence you have in the reliability of certain members of your group. The player gets five trust points at the beginning of play. Awarding a trust point to a group member makes it easier for the player's character to aid and assist them. However, the trusted character can "burn" a trust point to betray the trusting character. This allows the traitor to gain a short-term advantage over the trusting character (like blocking use of an investigative ability or subtracting a penalty from the result of a general ability die roll).

== Publication history ==
Night's Black Agents was written by Ken Hite, and published by Pelgrane Press in 2012. The "-D" suffix indicates that the product is the watermarked digital download version available from download sites; some books are only available as digital downloads.

Name	Author(s)	Description
PELGN01 Night's Black Agents	Kenneth Hite	The core rulebook
PELGN01DEMO Excess Baggage	Kevin Kulp & Kenneth Hite	An introductory adventure in which the characters get involved in a car chase through the streets of Krakow, Poland to retrieve a suitcase bomb from a terrorist. Then things take a strange turn and get complicated...
PELGN02 The Zalozhniy Quartet	Gareth Ryder-Hanrahan	A campaign arc of four adventures that begins in Eastern Europe, where the player characters must fight against the Russian Mafia, Soviet spies, and supernatural horrors ● The Zalozhniy Sanction: The agents are sent to uncover a gun-smuggling operation in Odesa, Ukraine. However, something sinister is packed away amongst the contraband... ● Out of the House of Ashes: Old World elegance, covert operations... and vampires. This mission is the subtle, baroque portion of the quartet. ● The Boxmen: In this operation, the agents' target is a safe-deposit box inside a Swiss bank. However, a rival team of crooks also have their sights on the box. ● Treason in the Blood: This mission pits the agents against the most supernatural horrors. They have to deal with the legacy of St John Philby, the Conspiracy's machinations, and the interference of other mysterious factions who have an interest in the Rubedo.
PELGN03 Double Tap	Kenneth Hite, John Adamus, Will Hindmarch, Kevin Kulp, Christian Lindke, James Palmer, Will Plant & Rob Wieland	Rules expansion for the core rulebook. Adds the "Suspyramid" conspiracy dynamic – in which the NPC members of the vampire conspiracy act according to their own understanding of the hierarchy and their role in it.
PELGN05 The Dracula Dossier: Director`s Handbook	Kenneth Hite, Gareth Ryder-Hanrahan, Heather Albano, Paul Baldowski, Kennon Bauman, Walt Ciechenowski, Justin Farquhar, Elsa S. Henry, Carol Johnson, Marissa Kelly, Shoshana Kessock, Shawn Merwin, James Palmer, Nathan Paoletta, Will Plant, Wes Schneider, Christopher Sniezak, Phil Vecchione, Cat Tobin, Simon Rogers, Wade Rockett, & Sidney Bishopgate.	The premise of this sourcebook is that the novel Dracula by Bram Stoker is actually based on true events. In the 1880s and 1890s Her Majesty's Government ran Operation EDOM – an attempt to contact, recruit and control Count Dracula as the ultimate asset. Stoker leaked documents about it, but did so in the form of a fanciful penny dreadful to avoid being hunted by one or both sides. The characters are present-day British secret agents who must discover what has happened since then.
PELGN06 The Dracula Dossier: Dracula Unredacted	Bram Stoker, Gareth Ryder-Hanrahan, & Kenneth Hite	The declassified, unedited, unredacted, fully uncensored text of the collected agents' field reports that formed the basis for Bram Stoker's "novel" Dracula. Includes notations and any associated files. N.B. A combination of novel / gamer fiction and sourcebook that contains the full text of Bram Stoker's Dracula with added content by Ryder-Hanrahan and Hite.
PELGN07 The Dracula Dossier: Card deck	?	A 52-card Dracula Dossier deck that The Director can use in their games.
PELGN08 the Dracula Dossier: The EDOM Field Manual	Gareth Ryder-Hanrahan	The basic field manual for new members of Britain's Operation EDOM. Adds the "OpPyramid" conspiracy dynamic – describing how Operation EDOM (and similar organizations) will respond to the characters' actions.
PELGN09 The Dracula Dossier: The EDOM Files	John Adamus, Stephanie Bryant, Dennis Detwiller, Kenneth Hite, Emma Marlow, Gareth Ryder-Hanrahan, Ruth Tillman, & Bill White	Eight Operation EDOM adventures set in a variety of periods from the 1870s to the modern day.
PELGN10D The Dracula Dossier: The Hawkins Papers	Gareth Ryder-Hanrahan & Kenneth Hite	A collection of 30 handouts to help point the players in the right direction.
PELGN11 The Thrill of Dracula: Two lifetimes of playing with the Dracula origin story	Kenneth Hite	A sourcebook about the telling of Dracula's story in their many mediums, from medieval propaganda to Bram Stoker's novel to modern day movies and television. It also contains hooks for Night's Black Agents campaigns and backgrounds for vampire-based campaigns.
PELGN12D The Dubai Reckoning	John Adamus & Gareth Ryder-Hanrahan	An adventure that can be played with or without vampire conspiracy elements.
PELGN13D Looking Glass: Hong Kong	Thomas McGrenery	A city setting for many possible GUMSHOE games including NBA.
PELGN14 The Persephone Extraction	Gareth Ryder-Hanrahan, Heather Albano, Emma Marlow, Will Plant, Bill White	A campaign for Night's Black Agents, combining ancient horrors from classical mythology with the modern terrors of conspiracy and bioterrorism.
PELGN15 Night's Black Agents Director's Screen & Resource Guide	Gareth Ryder-Hanrahan	A four-panel Director's screen for Night’s Black Agents, plus a 56-page resource guide with campaign hints and stats for new NPCs and monsters.
PEL13AN01 The Harker Intrusion	Gareth Ryder-Hanrahan	A Free RPG Day 2015 giveaway adventure for NBA that can be played as a one-shot or as the prelude to the Dracula Dossier campaign. The team is a group of freshly disavowed spies on the run who meet in Morocco. A journalist hiding out in Marrakesh knows too much and won't see another sunrise if the team doesn't help her. The hardcopy booklet also comes with the 13th Age D20 system role-playing game adventure At Land's End.
PEL13AN02 The Van Helsing Letter	Gareth Ryder-Hanrahan	A Free RPG Day 2016 scenario for up to six players is an introduction to both NBA and the Dracula Dossier campaign. The characters come upon a letter from Van Helsing himself, describing a rare species of German vampire called the nachzehrer. The hardcopy booklet also comes with the 13th Age D20 system role-playing game adventure Swords Against the Dead.
PELGN04D Dust and Mirrors	James Semple, Marie-Anne Fischer, Thery Ehrlich, & Chris J	The Night's Black Agents original soundtrack. Incidental and mood music pieces for use during NBA sessions.
PELGN16D The Dracula Vector	Gareth Ryder-Hanrahan	A short (1-2 session) introductory adventure for NBA. Agents hunt a vampire—who may or may not be Dracula—across London.
PELGN17D Find FOREVER	Gareth Ryder-Hanrahan	An adventure for NBA that can be played as a one-shot or the third or fourth mission in a new campaign. Agents investigate the vampire-connected FOREVER, an American intelligence "ultrablack" project.

Currently in development, the Threat Profiles supplement is a planned combined vampiric bestiary and conspiracy guide from Kenneth Hite and Gareth Ryder-Hanrahan, "including minions, lairs and Conspiracy nodes."

== Reception ==
The core rulebook won Best Game (Silver Award) and Best Writing (Silver Award) at the 2013 ENnie Awards. The Zalozhniy Quartet (2013) was nominated for Best Adventure, but did not win.

The Dracula Dossier expansion, comprising Handbook and Unredacted, was the result of a very successful Kickstarter project that brought in £87,935 (or just over US$138,000 in 2014).

== Translations ==
The core rulebook Night's Black Agents and The Zalozhniy Quartet (French title: Le Quatuor Zalozhniy) have been translated into French by the publisher 7ème Cercle.

The publisher also created and released 7EC-NBACDA/FRA Carnets de l'Agent (English title: Agent Notebooks), a French-language character sheet pack. It is a 16-page black & white booklet with a full-color cover that basically contains three sections. The first is a cheat sheet for the Gumshoe system and some of Night's Black Agents' special genre-based rules. The second is an extended character sheet that allows the player to keep all the detailed character information (statistics, background, equipment, etc.) together in one place. The third and last part is a campaign notebook to record the character's notes on the conspiracy (clues, events, NPCs, guesses about the conspyramid, etc.).

== See also ==
Other role-playing games with similar premise:

- Delta Green
- Hunter: The Vigil
- Bureau 13
- Conspiracy X
