= GURPS Arabian Nights =

1993 supplement for the GURPS role-playing game

- Cover art by Rowena Morrill
- Designers: Phil Masters
- Publishers: Steve Jackson Games
- Publication: 1993; 33 years ago
- Genres: Alternate histories, Arabian Nights
- Systems: GURPS third edition

GURPS Arabian Nights is an Arabian Nights sourcebook for the third edition of GURPS (Generic Universal Role-Playing System), written by Phil Masters, and published by Steve Jackson Games in 1993.

== Description ==
GURPS Arabian Nights contains rules and suggestions for creating a fantasy Arabian Nights campaign setting. The book describes:

- an extensive outline of history in the Arabian region from 600 to 1400.
- social conventions of the time such as Claim to Hospitality and Code of Honor, as well as descriptions of money, jobs and typical daily expenses.
- new magic spells and monsters
- suggestions for setting up a campaign

The book also includes a sample adventure, "The Tale of the Poet, the Slave, and What Was Not Theirs".

== Publication history ==
GURPS Arabian Nights is a 128-page softcover book designed by Phil Masters for the third edition of GURPS, with interior art by Sam Inabinet and Laura Eisenhour, and cover art by Rowena Morrill. It was published by Steve Jackson Games in 1993, and a second printing was published in 1998.

In the 2014 book Designers & Dragons: The '80s, game historian Shannon Appelcline noted that Steve Jackson Games decided in the early 1990s to stop publishing adventures, and as a result "SJG was now putting out standalone GURPS books rather than the more complex tiered book lines. This included more historical subgenre books. Some, such as GURPS Camelot (1991) and GURPS China (1991), were clearly sub-subgenres, while others like GURPS Old West (1991) and GURPS Middle Ages I (1992) covered genres notably missing before this point".

== Reception ==
In the July 1995 edition of Dragon (Issue #219), Allen Varney was not initially impressed with the thought of another sub-genre book from SJG, commenting: "To my mind, the GURPS 'universal' RPG believes in encoding all of existence as rules, as opposed to creating fun campaigns. Some of its worldbooks show that with sufficient effort, a realistic viewpoint can make any adventure genre dull". Varney used the example of flying carpets in this book that "won't bank sharply or fast", sarcastically pointing out "players might have accidentally tried something fun", but did admit that this was a "fascinating sourcebook of real-world Islamic history with digressions into legendary fantasy". He also enjoyed the section on Arabian attitudes to magic, and the suggestions for setting up a campaign. Overall he thought: "If you like genuine Islamic culture or want to know more about it, GURPS Arabian Nights is worth searching for".

== Other reviews ==
- The Last Province August–September 1993 (issue #5, p. 8, "Pandora's Box")

== See also ==
- List of GURPS publications
