= Tim Gerritsen =

Timothy S. Gerritsen is a producer and designer who has been involved primarily in video games.

== Career ==
Tim Gerritsen was the Business Development Manager for Human Head Studios. Gerritsen wanted to license a tabletop role-playing game for the Rune computer game (2000), which could be used to create new IP that could in turn be used in future releases in the computer game franchise. Gerritsen looked for potential licensees in 1999 at Gen Con 32 and decided the best choice was small company Atlas Games, who would focus more attention on the game design, and Atlas had connections with designers such as Robin Laws, Jonathan Tweet, Greg Stolze, and John Scott Tynes. Gerritsen co-founded Big Rooster Games in 2007 which was developing The 2008 version of Talisman.

Gerritsen was later director of product development for Irrational Games.

== Education ==
Gerritsen graduated Magna Cum Laude from University of Wisconsin–Milwaukee with a bachelor's degree in History with minor in film.
