= Skulduggery (role-playing game) =

Tabletop role-playing game by Robin Laws

Skulduggery is a role-playing game by Robin D. Laws, published by Pelgrane Press in 2010.

== Description ==
Skulduggery uses a variant of the system from The Dying Earth Roleplaying Game.

== Publication history ==
Shannon Appelcline noted that after Pelgrane Press published its GUMSHOE System, "In 2010, Pelgrane pushed back toward their original Dying Earth systems in two ways. First they released Skulduggery (2010), a more generic version of the system that Laws created for The Dying Earth Roleplaying Game. Second - due in large part to the success of their going-out-of-Dying Earth sale the previous year - Pelgrane decided to relicense the setting. After the release of an adventure and a new issue of the Excellent Prismatic Spray - to get things rolling again - Robin Laws' Dying Earth Revivification Folio will simultaneously offer streamlined Dying Earth rules and provide magic rules for Skulduggery."
