= 2013 Origins Award winners =

The following are the winners of the 40th annual (2013) Origins Award, presented at Origins 2014:

Category	Winner	Company	Designer(s)
Best Roleplaying Game	Numenera	Monte Cook Games	Monte Cook
Best Roleplaying Supplement	Night's Watch	Green Ronin Publishing	Joe Carriker, John Hay, Lee Hammock, Ian Ireland, Michelle Lyons, and Brett Rebischke
Best Board Game	Trains	Alderac Entertainment Group	Hisashi Hayashi
Best Collectible Card Games	Pokémon Black & White - Legendary Treasures	The Pokémon Company	
Best Traditional Card Game	Love Letter	Alderac Entertainment Group	Seiji Kanai
Best Family, Party or Children's Game	Three Little Pigs	IELLO	Laurent Pouchain
Best Gaming Accessory	Space Gaming Mat	HC+D Supplies	
Best Miniatures Rules	Marvel HeroClix: Avengers Vs. X-Men Starters	WizKids	
Best Historical Miniature Figure/Line	Fate of a Nation: Arab Israeli Wars	Battlefront Miniatures Ltd.	Evan Allen and Chris Townley
Best Historical Board Game	1775 Rebellion	Academy Games	Beau Beckett, Jeph Stahl
Best Historical Miniature Rules	Fields of Fire 2nd Edition	Proving Ground Games	Mark E. Brown, Chris Brutsche and Larry Yeager
Best Miniature Figure Line	Malifaux: The Guild's Judgement	Wyrd Miniatures	Matt Anderson, Nathan Caroland, Justin Gibbs, Eric Johns and Mack Martin
Best Game-Related Publication	TableTop (web series)	Wil Wheaton and Felicia Day	
