= 2016 ENnie Award winners =

- Awarded for: Best role-playing games of previous year
- Country: United Kingdom & United States
- Presented by: Gen Con
- First award: 2001
- Website: Archive of 2016 ENNIE Awards

The following are the winners of the 16th annual ENnie Awards, held in 2016:

== Judges' Spotlight Winners ==
- Worlds in Peril (Samjoko Publishing) – Stacy Muth
- Eclipse Phase: Firewall (Posthuman Studios) – Jakub Nowosad
- Out of the Abyss (Wizards of the Coast) – Kayra Keri Küpçü
- Sword Coast Adventure's Guide (Wizards of the Coast) – Kurt Wiegel

== List of gold and silver winners ==
| Category | Gold Winner | Silver Winner |
|---|---|---|
| Best Adventure | Curse of Strahd (Wizards of the Coast) | Dracula Dossier – Director's Handbook (Pelgrane Press) |
| Best Aid/Accessory | All Rolled Up – Dracula Dossier: The Black Archive (All Rolled Up) | 13th Age Game Master's Screen and Resource Book (Pelgrane Press) |
| Best Art, Cover | Curse of Strahd (Wizards of the Coast) | Achtung! Cthulhu: Shadows of Atlantis (Modiphius Entertainment Ltd) |
| Best Art, Interior | Dragon Age Core Rulebook (Green Ronin Publishing) | Baby Bestiary Handbook Vol 1 (Metal Weave Games) |
| Best Blog | World Builder | Campaign Mastery |
| Best Cartography | Shadows of Esteren Cartography of Tri Kazel (Agate Editions) | Maze of the Blue Medusa (Satyr Press) |
| Best Electronic Book | Maze of the Blue Medusa (Satyr Press) | Trail of Cthulhu: The Long Con (Pelgrane Press) |
| Best Family Game | No Thank You, Evil! (Monte Cook Games) | Ryuutama (Kotodama Heavy Industries) |
| Best Free Game | Delta Green: Need to Know (Arc Dream Publishing) | FAITH: the Sci-Fi RPG (Burning Games LTD) |
| Best Free Product | Pathfinder Module: We Be Goblins Free (Paizo, Inc) | Race to Starport (Pelgrane Press) |
| Best Game | Dragon Age Core Rulebook (Green Ronin Publishing) | Feng Shui 2 Core Rulebook (Atlas Games) |
| Best Miniature Product | Pathfinder Battles – The Rusty Dragon Inn: Bar (Paizo Inc.) | Frostgrave (Osprey Publishing) |
| Best Monster/Adversary | Pathfinder RPG: Bestiary 5 (Paizo, Inc) | Baby Bestiary Handbook Vol 1 (Metal Weave Games) |
| Best Podcast | Ken and Robin Talk About Stuff | Role Playing Public Radio |
| Best Production Values | Numenera Boxed Set Edition: Reliquary (Monte Cook Games) | Cthulhu Britannica London (Cubicle 7) |
| Best RPG Related Product | Ken Writes About Stuff Volume 3 (Pelgrane Press) | Pathfinder Adventure Card Game: Wrath of the Righteous (Paizo, Inc) |
| Best Rules | Feng Shui 2 Core Rulebook (Atlas Games) | Urban Shadows (Magpie Games) |
| Best Setting | Feng Shui 2 Core Rulebook (Atlas Games) | Southlands Campaign Setting (Kobold Press) |
| Best Software | Roll20 (The Orr Group, LLC) | Hero Lab for D&D 5th Edition on Windows, Mac and iPad (Lone Wolf Development) |
| Best Supplement | The Dracula Dossier: Hawkins Papers (Pelgrane Press) | Delta Green: Agent's Handbook (Arc Dream Publishing) |
| Best Website | Gnome Stew – The Gaming Blog | See Page XX: The Pelgrane Press Webzine |
| Best Writing | The Dracula Dossier: Director's Handbook (Pelgrane Press) | Maze of the Blue Medusa (Satyr Press) |
| Product of the Year | Dracula Dossier Director's Handbook (Pelgrane Press) | Curse of Strahd (Wizards of the Coast) |
| Fan's Choice for Best Publisher | Paizo Publishing | Pelgrane Press |
