= Irish Games Association =

Non-profit body that promotes gaming in Ireland

The Irish Games Association (IGA) is a non-profit body which promotes gaming in Ireland. It runs, supports, and publicises gaming events, while "seeking to communicate and cooperate with others that do likewise".

The IGA engages in a number of activities designed to "further its stated aim of promoting gaming in Ireland", and has evolved over its lifespan.

== Gaelcon ==
Originally, the IGA was a group composed of different gaming interests from around Ireland that came together to organise Gaelcon, an independent games convention (i.e., one not run by a college games society or a trader). The first Gaelcon was run in 1989 in the Royal Dublin Society. It has been run annually since then, growing to become Ireland's largest independent games convention. Subsequent venues included Croke Park's convention centre, the Royal Hospital Kilmainham, Clontarf Castle and Jury's/Ballsbridge Hotel. While the main focus of the convention is on role-playing games (RPGs), war games and collectible card games (such as Dungeons & Dragons, Warhammer 40,000 and Magic: The Gathering, respectively) and board games, other aspects include events such as the annual charity auction, which has raised in excess of €300,000 since its inception at Gaelcon 1996.

Writers of RPG game scenarios run at the convention have included Gareth Hanrahan, and Cat Tobin, and guests of honour have included Chaosium's Lynne Hardy.

In 2006, the international Diana Jones Award was awarded to "Irish Game Convention Charity Auctions", including Gaelcon and Warpcon.

== Other activities ==
The IGA seeks to help the Irish gaming community by organising events, publicising others' events and providing what assistance and information it can to others who are "working on behalf of the gaming community in Ireland". This has included the provision of financial assistance to new conventions and gaming societies.

The IGA's activities and services have included organising and running:

- the Gaelcon games convention, held annually on the October bank holiday weekend;
- the Academy of Eblana, a live action role-playing game (or "rubber-sword LARP") with a fantasy setting, which ran from 2013 to 2018;
- weekly games nights, held in Dublin.

The IGA first incorporated as a company limited by guarantee in 2021.
