= Skullduggery =

Skullduggery or Skulduggery may refer to:

== Film and television ==
- Skullduggery (1970 film), an American adventure film starring Burt Reynolds
- Skullduggery (1983 film), a Canadian horror film
- Skullduggery (Kinnikuman), or Kinkotsuman, a character from the anime Kinnikuman
- Skullduggery, a business featured in season 2, episode 5 of The Profit, 2014
- Skull Duggery, a character from the first two episodes of Speed Racer, 1967

== Other uses ==
- Skullduggery (album), a 1976 album by Steppenwolf
- Skull Duggery (rapper) (1971–2022), American rapper
- Skullduggery (board game), a children's logic and strategy game
- Skulduggery (role-playing game), a 2010 game by Robin D. Laws
- Skulduggery, the skeleton detective from the children's book series Skulduggery Pleasant by Derek Landy
