= Phil Masters =

British role-playing game designer and author

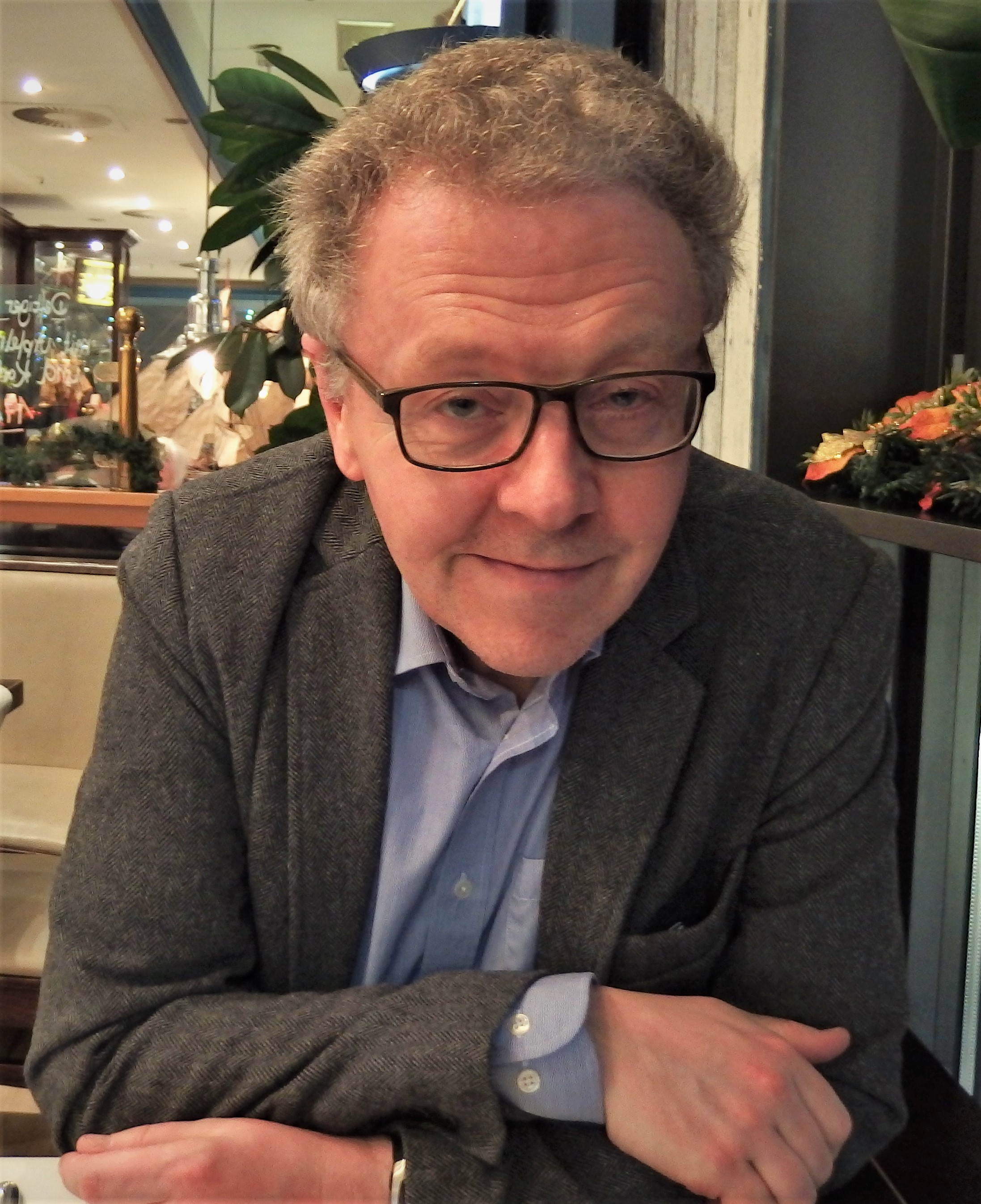
Masters in 2018

Phil Masters is a British role-playing game designer and author.

== Career ==
Phil Masters' writing credits in role-playing games go back to White Dwarf Magazine #20 and the Fiend Folio of Advanced Dungeons & Dragons. Masters wrote about his British campaign for the Champions superhero game in Kingdom of Champions (1990) from Hero Games. He contributed adventures to Hogshead Publishing's licensed version of Warhammer Fantasy Roleplay in the mid-1990s. Masters also contributed articles to the magazine The Excellent Prismatic Spray, and for Cugel's Compendium of Indispensable Advantages for The Dying Earth Roleplaying Game, by Pelgrane Press. He also co-wrote or contributed to two supplements for Ars Magica later in the decade.

Masters has written or co-written numerous GURPS supplements, including GURPS Arabian Nights, GURPS Castle Falkenstein and GURPS Discworld, and various Mage: The Sorcerer's Crusade supplements for White Wolf, Inc. He also created The Skool Rules, a game based on the Nigel Molesworth books, and has self-published The Small Folk, a wainscot fantasy RPG based on his contribution to Dreaming Cities for Guardians of Order.
