= GURPS Fantasy II: Adventures in the Mad Lands =

1992 supplement for the GURPS role-playing game

GURPS Fantasy II
Adventures in the Mad Lands
- Cover art by Rob Prior
- Designers: Robin D. Laws
- Publishers: Steve Jackson Games
- Publication: 1992; 34 years ago
- Genres: Fantasy
- Systems: GURPS third edition

GURPS Fantasy II: Adventures in the Mad Lands is a fantasy adventure sourcebook for the third edition of the GURPS (Generic Universal Role-Playing System), written by Robin D. Laws, and published by Steve Jackson Games in 1992.

== Description ==
This book describes the setting of the Mad Lands, where insane gods reshape reality at a whim, and the players' characters can only hope to survive. Topics covered include

- The Land: weather, terrain and fauna
- Local culture and society, and details of daily life
- Designing a character for this setting
- The pantheon of ten gods
- Monsters and beasts
- Shamanism and sorcery
- How to design to campaign
- A sample village called Kawa Tok, describing notable people
- Six short adventure ideas

== Publication history ==
GURPS Fantasy II: Adventures in the Mad Lands is a supplement for GURPS third edition rules. It was designed by Robin D. Laws with editing by Steve Jackson, and published by Steve Jackson Games as a 128-page softcover book with one 15" × 20" map sheet. It featured illustrations by John Hartwell, a map by Laura Eisenhour, and a cover by Rob Prior.

In the 2014 book Designers & Dragons: The '90s, game historian Shannon Appelcline noted that game designer Robin Laws was contributing to the games fanzine Alarums & Excursions in the late 1980s, which led him to make contributions to the surreal role-playing game Over the Edge while the designers were preparing it to be published. His involvement with Alarums & Excursions "also led Laws to write GURPS Fantasy II for Steve Jackson Games that same year."

== Reception ==
In the October 1993 edition of Dragon (Issue 198), Rick Swan thought the tone was all wrong for a setting that "hints at dark fantasy, with the requisite gloomy atmosphere and life-threatening locales." But instead, Swan found things like a god named Zewa Zab the Gopher God "elicits as many chuckles as goose bumps. Mad Lands? They're mad all right, but that's 'mad' as in 'goofy'." He did compliment the "better-than-usual graphics" and "meticulously edited text," and called writer Robin Laws "a promising talent", complimenting his writing as "solid throughout." Swan was disappointed in the full colour map bound into the back of the book, calling it "the package's most disappointing feature [...] it has little value as a play aid" due to its few details. He also wanted more from the included adventures, finding them too short and lacking in detail. Swan concluded by giving the book an average rating of 3 out of 6, saying, "I was never intrigued as much as amused, perhaps because it's hard to get worked up over a deity resembling a giant moose [...] Adventures in the Mad Lands boasts an exquisite premise, but it could use a bolder vision." "

== Other reviews ==
- The Last Province Issue 4 (June/July 1993)

== See also ==
- List of GURPS publications
