= Robin Laws =

Canadian writer and game designer (born 1964)

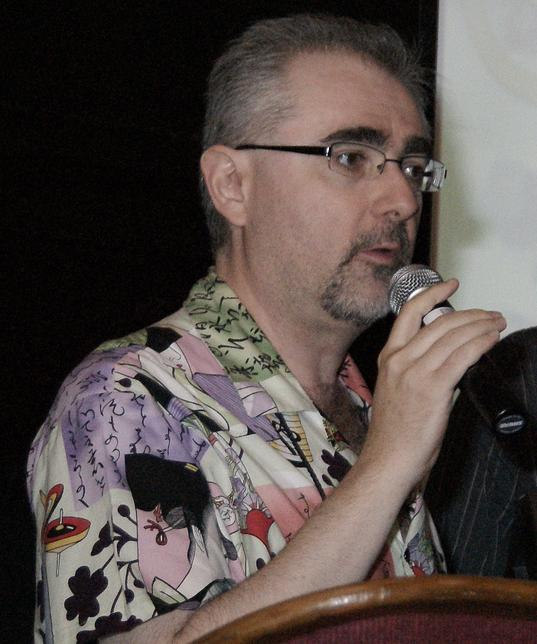
- Laws in 2012
- Born: October 14, 1964 (age 62); Orillia, Ontario, Canada
- Occupations: Writer, game designer, author
- Writing career
- Genre: Role-playing games

Robin D. Laws (born October 14, 1964 in Orillia, Ontario, Canada) is a Canadian writer and game designer who lives in Toronto, Canada. He is the author of several novels and role-playing games as well as an anthologist.

== Game designer ==
=== 1990s ===
Laws has been playing role-playing games since he was a teenager around 1980 and has worked as a game designer since the early 1990s.

Around 1990, Jonathan Tweet wrote about a game of his in Alarums & Excursions, and Laws corresponded with Tweet about it there. John Nephew of Atlas Games then offered Tweet to publish the game, and Laws contributed to it. The result was Over the Edge (1992).

Daedalus Games got its start in 1993 when Laws came to Jose Garcia with an idea for a role-playing game based on Hong Kong action cinema; while Garcia liked the idea, his priority was Nexus: The Infinite City which was published in 1994 with Garcia as the primary designer and developer, and Laws, Bruce Baugh, and Rob Heinsoo as additional authors. Daedalus Games was then incorporated as Daedalus Entertainment in advance of publishing the Hong Kong action setting Laws had envisioned, but beginning with a collectible-card game to take advantage of that then-booming market. Laws therefore designed the collectible card game Shadowfist (1995). With the income from the card game, Daedalus published the role-playing game by Laws as Feng Shui (1996), which utilized a variation of game rules from Nexus, and began to publish supplements. However, Daedalus had to file for chapter 11 bankruptcy protection in 1997 when the CCG market crashed; when the company sold some of its properties a few years later, Laws re-acquired Feng Shui. Nephew told Laws that he would like to reprint Feng Shui, so when Laws got the rights back he brought the game to Atlas Games, in a deal announced on March 22, 1999.

Meanwhile, Laws was active throughout the 1990s as a freelance writer for other games including GURPS, Underground, Talislanta, Earthdawn, and Vampire: The Dark Ages, and later for supplements to the third edition of Dungeons & Dragons.

=== Noughties ===
In 1998, Greg Stafford asked Laws to create a new role-playing game based on his world of Glorantha, which became known at first as Hero Wars, published in 2000 as the first fully professional product for Issaries, and later expanded and re-published in 2003 as HeroQuest. A second edition was published in 2009; Laws was then able to provide additional scaffolding for players to construct setting-appropriate narratives with the rules provided. At the same time, Laws was engaged in some more experimental RPG design. Hogshead Publishing published his Pantheon and Other Roleplaying Games (2000) as one of the company's "New Style" RPGs, while Atlas Games contracted with Laws to design the Rune (2001) role-playing game, based on the Rune computer game. Laws determined that for Rune, "the game would need to have a big point of difference to distinguish it from the many other fantasy games available"; in this case, the game would allow players to swap roles with the Game Master (GM): "You can win! And when you're not the GM, it's not boring because the GM can win!"

Pelgrane Press revealed on January 20, 2000, that Laws was going to be the primary author for their licensed role-playing game based on the Jack Vance stories in the Dying Earth setting. Laws was the senior designer for The Dying Earth Roleplaying Game. As Pelgrane Press expanded, they launched the GUMSHOE system, designed by Laws based on the claim that investigative gaming had been introduced to RPGs under the mistaken assumption that acquiring clues should be treated as a contingent reward; the new system ensured that players would learn the clues needed to proceed with their investigations. The Esoterrorists (2006) by Laws was the first release with this system, supported by his sourcebook The Esoterror Factbook (2006); the next year, Pelgrane released Fear Itself (2007) by Laws. Laws has also contributed supplements to Ken Hite's Trail of Cthulhu line, notably the randomized Armitage Files resource and the Dreamhounds of Paris campaign frame, in which players take on the roles of actual surrealist artists as they confront horror in the Dreamlands.

=== 2010s onward ===
Laws also designed Mutant City Blues (2009) and Ashen Stars (2011) as investigative games in the superhero and space opera genres. His RPG Skulduggery (2010) extrapolated the treatment of conflict, especially interpersonal conflict, from the Dying Earth setting to a variety of other contexts, and the Gaean Reach RPG (2012) cross-fertilized Dying Earth and GUMSHOE rules in Vance's sci-fi setting.

In 2012, Laws also ran a Kickstarter for his game Hillfolk, featuring his new Dramasystem. The goal was $3,000, but raised over $93,000, and it went on to win the 2014 Diana Jones Award. After another successful Kickstarter by Atlas Games, Laws released a second edition of Feng Shui twenty years after its original release, removing obstructive rules and marking a "critical shift" in the game's background. Laws has since published the specialized Cthulhu Confidential (2017), offering a modified GUMSHOE system for roleplaying with one player and the GM, and the Yellow King RPG inspired by Robert W. Chambers (2020), also for Pelgrane Press.

In March 2025, Laws was appointed Creative Director of Pelgrane Press.

== Author ==
Robin D. Laws published his first novel Pierced Heart in 1996, set in the world of Over the Edge; it was released as an e-book in 2014. His subsequent novels included the original The Rough and the Smooth as well as novels set in the game settings of Warhammer Fantasy Roleplay, City of Heroes and Pathfinder. Laws also had stories published in Synister Creative's pulp magazine, and in the fiction anthology The Book of All Flesh for the All Flesh Must Be Eaten RPG: "The first is a light-hearted adventure, and the other is really, really dark". Laws wrote Robin's Laws of Good Game Mastering (2002) for Steve Jackson Games and edited 40 Years of Gen Con (2007), a book of interviews and photographs, published by Atlas. Laws also wrote Hamlet's Hit Points (2010), published by small press company Gameplaywright, and is currently working on a second volume, applying the same approach to narrative structure with a focus on fiction and screenplay writing. Laws is also the editor of the Stone Skin Press fiction imprint from Pelgrane Press.

In other media, he contributed to the King of Dragon Pass and Six Ages computer games and wrote for Marvel's Iron Man with Mike Grell in 2003. He writes an irregular advice column for role-players called See Page XX, and releases a weekly podcast with Ken Hite for Pelgrane Press, Ken and Robin talk about stuff.

== Conventions ==
Robin Laws is often invited speak at conventions around the world, having made appearances at Gen Con Australia and Ropecon in Finland.

Laws attends Gen Con Indy and the Toronto International Film Festival every year. He has stated that he often cannot attend Fan Expo Canada because that convention often takes place too soon after Gen Con and too soon before TIFF, but he likes to attend it whenever he can. He was Fan Expo's gaming guest of honor in 2005 and 2010.

Since 2010, Laws has participated in Dragonmeet in London as a guest of Pelgrane Press.

== Works ==
A partial list of works by Robin D Laws:

=== Role-playing games and related supplements ===
For 13th Age:

- 13 True Ways

Ashen Stars

Cthulhu Confidential

For Deadlands: Hell on Earth

- Monsters, Muties and Misfits (et al.)

For Dungeons & Dragons:

- Dungeon Master's Guide II (et al.)
- Seven Strongholds (Atlas Games Penumbra)

For the Earthdawn RPG:

- Throal: The Dwarf Kingdom
- Infected
- Horrors
- Denizens of Earthdawn (Volume 2)
- The Theran Empire
- Parlainth Adventures (et al.)

The Esoterrorists

- The Esoterror Factbook

Fear Itself

Feng Shui: Action Movie Roleplaying

- Four Bastards
- Burning Shaolin

For the Firefly Role-Playing Game:

- Ghosts In the Black

Gaean Reach RPG

For Greg Stafford's Glorantha setting

- Glorantha: the Second Age and associated supplements
- HeroQuest first and second editions
- Hero Wars and associated supplements

For GURPS:

- Fantasy 2: Adventures in the Mad Lands

Hillfolk

Jack Vance's The Dying Earth Roleplaying Game

- Kaiin Player's Guide
- Turjan's Tome of Beauty and Horror (with Ian Thompson)
- Cugel's Compendium of Indispensable Advantages (et al.)
- The Excellent Prismatic Spray 2-5 (et al.)

Mutant City Blues

- Hard Helix

Nexus: The Infinite City (et al.)

OG: Unearthed Edition

For Over the Edge:

- Unauthorized Broadcast
- Weather the Cuckoo Likes
- Wildest Dreams
- Over the Edge, 2nd Edition (with Jonathan Tweet)

Pandemonium!: Adventures in Tabloid World (Contributor)

- Stranger Than Truth: Further Adventures in Tabloid World (Contributor)

Pantheon

Robin's Laws of Good Game Mastering (ISBN 1-55634-629-8)

Rune

Shadowfist Players' Guide Volume 1 (with Rob Heinsoo)

Star Trek: The Role Playing Game

Star Trek: The Next Generation RPG

- Raiders, Renegades, & Rogues (et al.)

For Talislanta:

- Sub-men Rising

For Trail of Cthulhu

- The Armitage Files
- Out of Space Scenario: Repairer of Reputations
- Stunning Eldritch Tales
- Dreamhounds of Paris

For the Underground RPG:

- Ways and Means

For Vampire: The Dark Ages:

- House of Tremere

For Vampire: the Masquerade:

- Blood Magic: Secrets of Thaumaturgy

For Warhammer Fantasy Roleplay

- Heart of Chaos (Doomstones Campaign Volume 3)

=== Novels ===
- Pierced Heart
- The Rough and the Smooth
- Honour of the Grave
- Sacred Flesh
- Liar's Peak
- Freedom Phalanx
- Pathfinder Tales: The Worldwound Gambit
- Pathfinder Tales: Blood of the City
- The Missing and the Lost
- Dreamblade fiction: Cathedral of Thorns

Preceded by Mike Grell	Iron Man writer 2003 (with Mike Grell in early 2003)	Succeeded by John Jackson Miller
