= Swords of the Serpentine =

Sword and sorcery role-playing game

- Publishers: Pelgrane Press
- Publication: 2022

Swords of the Serpentine is a 2022 urban sword-and-sorcery role-playing game by Kevin Kulp and Emily Dresner. Its rules are based on the Gumshoe System and it is published by Pelgrane Press.

== Publication history ==
Full publication of the game was delayed because of illustrators dropping out of the project during the first year of the COVID-19 pandemic. In June of 2020 the "Adventurers’ Edition" was released to pre-order customers: a PDF file with raw text and no illustrations. In July of 2021 a partly laid-out PDF file with many illustrations was distributed. Four months later a complete PDF version was released. The printed hardback book reached pre-order customers in July of 2022, over two years after the raw-text version.

== Reception ==
Swords of the Serpentine won the 2023 Silver ENnie Award for Best Cover Art and Best Setting, and the Gold ENnie Award for Best Supplement and Best Writing.

== Reviews ==
- Gnome Stew

== Publications ==
- Kulp, K. & Dresner, E. 2021 (antedated by one year). Swords of the Serpentine. A GUMSHOE-powered fantasy roleplaying game of swords, sorcery, cities and secrets. ISBN 978-1-912324-29-3. 380 pp.
- Kulp, K. 2024. Brought to Light. Four One-Shot Adventures for Swords of the Serpentine. ISBN 978-1-912324-46-0. 107 pp.
