= Warpcon =

Annual game convention in Cork, Ireland

- Status: Active
- Genre: Tabletop gaming, role-playing games
- Frequency: Annual
- Venue: UCC Student Centre
- Location: Cork
- Country: Ireland
- Inaugurated: 1990
- Organiser: WARPS

Warpcon is an annual wargaming and roleplaying convention held at University College Cork (UCC) in Cork, Ireland. As of 2010, the organisers reportedly described it as "Europe's largest student-run gaming convention". Beginning in 1990, it is run annually over a single weekend in January. Run by UCC's Wargaming And RolePlaying Society (WARPS), games played at Warpcon include role-playing games (RPGs) from several systems, collectible card games (CCGs), live action role-playing games (LARPs) and tabletop wargames. The 20th anniversary event, in 2010, reportedly hosted approximately 700 attendees.

== History ==
First held in 1990/1991, the inaugural event was attended by 40 people in a single-room venue, growing to approximately 650 people by the time of the 2009 convention.

In 2006, the Diana Jones Award for Excellence in Gaming was awarded to "Irish Game Convention Charity Auctions", including Gaelcon and Warpcon.

In past years, Warpcon has invited writers, artists and other special guests to sign merchandise and occasionally run events such as games-making workshops. Previous attendees and guests have included John Kovalic, Steve Jackson, Gareth Hanrahan, Games Workshop's Jervis Johnson, and actor David Nykl.

== Events and features ==
At previous Warpcon conventions, a charity auction of collectibles and other items has been held on the Saturday night. Past auctions have included signed first-edition and pre-publication books, slots to appear as a character drawn by John Kovalic in card game, Jayne Cobb's hat (as worn in the TV show Firefly), and the first ever "My Little Cthulhu" plush toy.

In previous years various CCGs, from Magic: The Gathering to Yu-Gi-Oh!, have been hosted at Warpcon. RPGs and LARPs from different systems are also run, with some based on the theme of that year's convention.
