= Fear Itself (role-playing game) =

Tabletop horror role-playing game by Robin Laws

Fear Itself is a role-playing game published by Pelgrane Press in 2007.

== Description ==
Fear Itself is one of the games to use the Gumshoe System. Set in a similar world to that of The Esoterrorists, Fear Itself instead focuses on ordinary people who are drawn into confrontation with the creatures of the Outer Black. The game introduces psychic powers to the Gumshoe System.

== Publication history ==
Robin Laws designed Fear Itself (2007) for Pelgrane Press's GUMSHOE system.

== Reviews ==
- Pyramid
