= Ryuutama =

Japanese tabletop role-playing game

- Designers: Atsuhiro Okada
- Publishers: Jive (Original); Kotodama Heavy Industries (English translation)
- Publication: 2007 (Original); 2016 (English translation)
- Genres: Fantasy
- Skills: role-playing, storytelling
- ISBN: 9784861764691 (Original Japanese edition)

Ryuutama is a Japanese tabletop role-playing game about traveling and friendship by Atsuhiro Okada. It is influenced by the animation of Hayao Miyazaki. The English translation is by Matt Sanchez and Andy Kitkowski. The game prioritizes exploration and everyday life in a fantasy world, rather than combat. Dragons represent landscapes and climates.

== Reception ==
Ryuutama won the 2016 Silver ENNIE Award for Best Family Game. Kristina Manente for Syfy recommended Ryuutama as one of twelve tabletop role-playing games beyond Dungeons & Dragons, praising the game's resources for GMs and focus on storytelling.
