= Q-workshop =

Polish dice manufacturer

- Company type: Private
- Industry: Role-playing, board games,
- Founded: 2001
- Headquarters: Poznan, Poland
- Key people: Patryk Strzelewicz, John Peake
- Products: dice
- Website: http://www.q-workshop.com

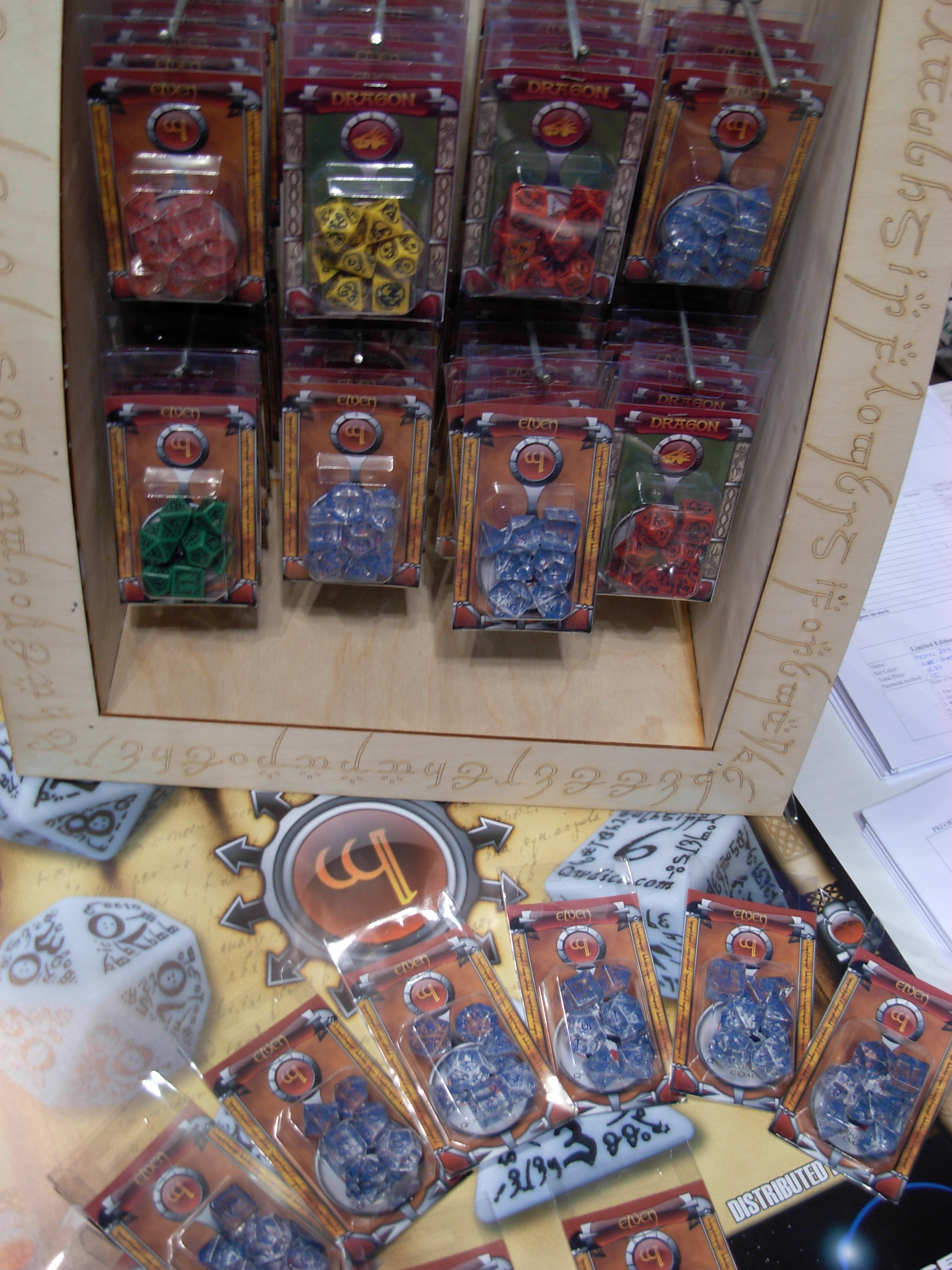
Sample dice products

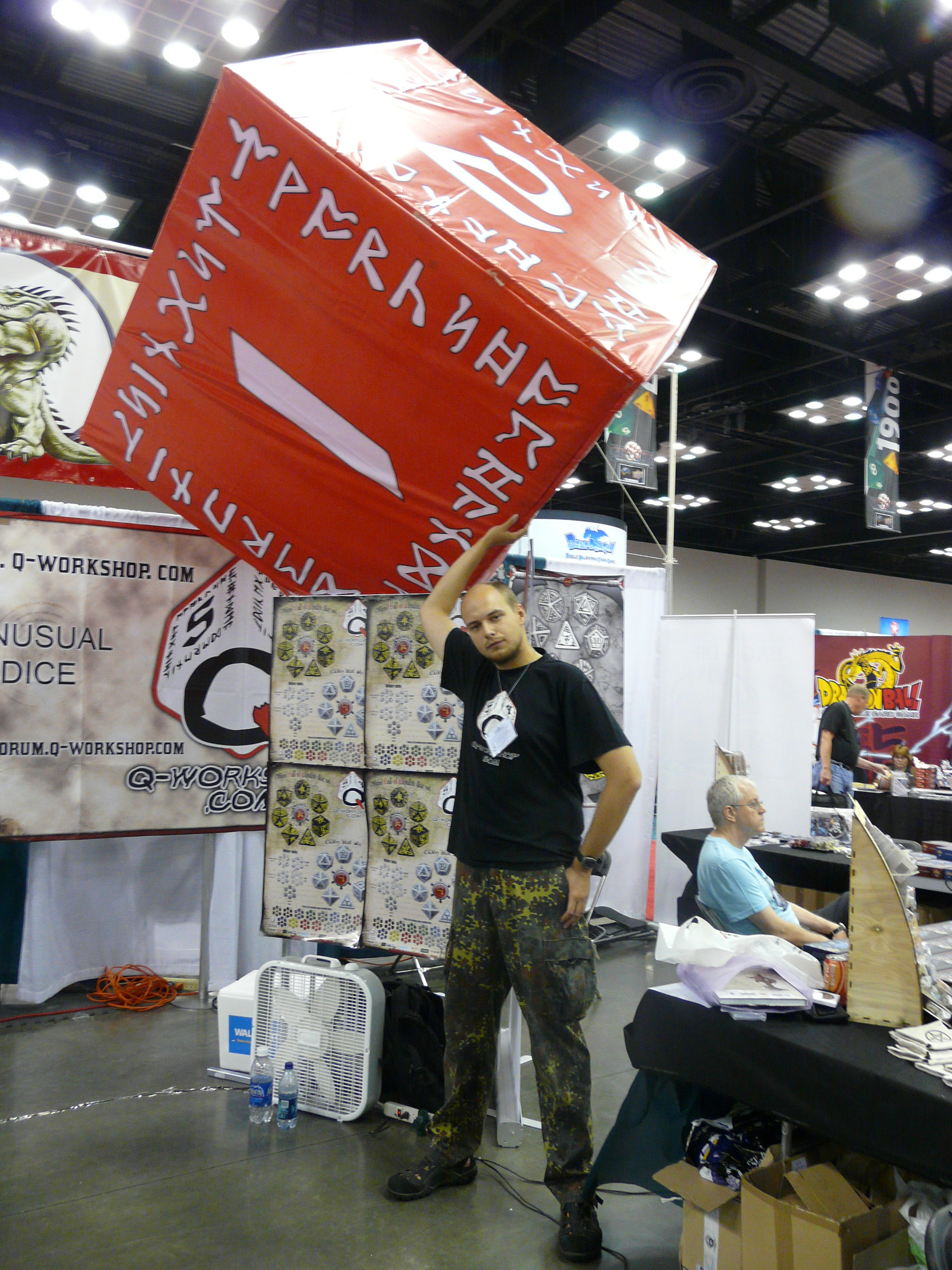
Q-Workshop booth at Gen Con Indy 2008

Q WORKSHOP is a Polish company located in Poznań that specializes in design and production of polyhedral dice and dice accessories for use in various games (role-playing games, board games and tabletop wargames). They also run an online retail store and maintain an active social media community.

Q WORKSHOP was established in 2001 by Patryk Strzelewicz. Initially, the company sold its products via online auction services, but in 2005 a website and online store were also established. Currently there are over 120 designs of dice in stock.

The Q WORKSHOP dice are known for their distinct style and engravings, featuring various motifs such as : Elven, Dragon, Runic. In 2007 Q WORKSHOP begun production of licensed dice sets, starting with Call of Cthulhu dice set on license from Chaosium Inc., and following up in 2008 with Munchkin dice on license from Steve Jackson Games and Pathfinder dice set on license from Paizo Publishing. In 2010, Q WORKSHOP produced a new licensed product based on Pinnacle Entertainment Group's Deadlands role-playing game.

Since then, the company has cooperated with companies like Knight Models, Monte Cook Games or Catalyst Game Labs, to create even more unusual dice designs.

The company offers a custom dice service allowing its clients to design and produce their own unique dice designs, which may then be added to the Q WORKSHOP public catalog.

In 2007 Patryk Strzelewicz was nominated to Entrepreneur of the Year Award hosted by Ernst & Young in the "New Business Category" for his involvement with Q WORKSHOP, and received a Keep Walking award for young business from Newsweek Polska.

It is the only company from Eastern Europe with membership in GAMA. In 2008 the Official Call of Cthulhu Dice won an Origins Award for "Game Accessory of the Year 2007". A couple of years later, the Metal Steampunk Dice Set has won an Origins Award for Best Gaming Accessory of the Year 2012.

In 2015, the company has released its first Kickstarter campaign, for the Metal Pathfinder Dice Set, together with Paizo. During 30 day campaign, the company has gathered almost $300,000, surpassing its initial goal of $50,000.

== Products ==
=== Dice Sets ===
- Classic
- Elven
- Runic
- Dragons
- Nuke and Nuke 3D
- Celtic 3D
- Dwarven
- Steampunk
- Steampunk Clockwork
- Forest
- Tribal
- Antique Fudge and Cyber Fudge
- Kanji

=== Battle Dice ===
- Orcish
- Sniper
- German
- United Kingdom
- Soviet
- USA

=== Licensed Dice ===
- Call of Cthulhu Dice
- Deadlands Dice
- Pathfinder Dice
- Legend of the Five Rings
- Warmachine
- Hordes
- Arkham Horror
- Kingsburg
- Numenera
- The Strange
- Cypher System
- The Adventures of the East Mark
- Dragon Age Dice set
- Battletech Dice Set
- Batman & Joker Dice Sets
- Infinity Faction Dice Sets

=== Dice Accessories ===
- Dice Cups
- Dice Bags
- Dice Towers
