= Mutant City Blues =

Tabletop role-playing game

Mutant City Blues is a role-playing game published by Pelgrane Press in 2009.

== Description ==
Mutant City Blues is one of the games to use the GUMSHOE System. In a world where 1% of the population has gained mutant powers, police procedure has changed forever. The characters are members of the Heightened Crime Investigation Unit that specializes in crimes involving the mutant community.

== Publication history ==
Robin Laws designed Mutant City Blues (2009) for Pelgrane Press's GUMSHOE system.
