= 2005 ENnie Award winners =

- Awarded for: Best role-playing games of previous year
- Country: United Kingdom & United States
- Presented by: Gen Con
- First award: 2001

The following are the winners of the 5th annual ENnie Awards, held in 2005:

== List of winners ==
| Category | Gold Winner | Silver Winner |
|---|---|---|
| Best Fan Site | www.d20srd.org | www.planewalker.com |
| Best Cartography | World Map of Greyhawk (Paizo Publishing) | City State of the Invincible Overlord (Necromancer Games) |
| Best Art, Cover | Beyond Countless Doorways (Malhavoc Press) | Blue Rose (Green Ronin Publishing) |
| Best Art, Interior | Monte Cook's Arcana Evolved (Malhavoc Press) | Vampire: the Requiem (White Wolf Publishing) |
| Best Production Values | Warhammer Fantasy RPG (Black Industries) | Ars Magica 5th Edition (Atlas Games) |
| Best Writing | Iron Kingdoms World Guide: Full Metal Fantasy Vol 2 (Privateer Press) | World of Darkness Core Book (White Wolf Publishing) |
| Best Rules | Ars Magica 5th Edition (Atlas Games) | Blue Rose (Green Ronin Publishing) |
| Best Adventure | Maure Castle: Dungeon Magazine #112 (Paizo Publishing) | Villiany Amok (Hero Games) |
| Best Monster or Adversary Product | Old World Bestiary WFRP (Black Industries) | Advanced Bestiary (Green Ronin Publishing) |
| Best Campaign Setting or Setting Supplement | Iron Kingdoms World Guide: Full Metal Fantasy Vol 2 (Privateer Press) | Black Company (Green Ronin Publishing) |
| Best Supplement | Vampire: the Requiem (White Wolf Publishing) | Beyond Countless Doorways (Malhavoc Press) |
| Best Aid or Accessory | Dungeon Magazine (Paizo Publishing) | Battlebox: Core Fantasy Set (Fiery Dragon Productions) |
| Best Free Product or Web Enhancement | Dungeon Magazine map and handouts (114-122) (Paizo Publishing) | Danse de La Mort parts 1-8 (White Wolf Publishing) |
| Best Electronic Product (Sponsored by Drive-Thru RPG) | PCGen 5.8.0 (PCGen) | Counter Collection Digital (Fiery Dragon Productions) |
| Best Game | Warhammer Fantasy Roleplaying (Black Industries) | World of Darkness Rulebook (White Wolf Publishing) |
| Best d20 Game | Monte Cook's Arcana Evolved (Malhavoc Press) | Blue Rose (Green Ronin Publishing) |
| Best Publisher | Green Ronin Publishing | Paizo Publishing |
| Fan's Choice for Best Publisher | Paradigm Concepts | Green Ronin Publishing |
