= Pantheon (role-playing game) =

New Style role-playing game by Robin Laws

Pantheon and other Roleplaying Games
- Cover of Pantheon, cover art by Frazer Irving
- Designers: Robin Laws
- Publishers: Hogshead Publishing
- Publication: 2000
- Systems: Narrative Cage Match

Pantheon and other Roleplaying Games is a 24-page book that includes five self-contained role-playing games for 3-6 players and designed to be completed in 1–2 hours.

== History ==
Pantheon and Other Roleplaying Games (2000), by Robin Laws, was published by Hogshead Publishing as one of their New Style role-playing games.

== System ==
Pantheon and Other Roleplaying Games consisted of five separate competitive storytelling role-playing games or scenarios, all with the same "Narrative Cage Match TM" system, in which players engage in storytelling rather than playing their characters. Each player tells one sentence of a story on their turn, and needs to mention their character every turn, while the other players have the opportunity to challenge this sentence with die-rolling and bidding using tokens. When all of the players run out of tokens, they finish the story and tally points on a score sheet.

Pantheon introduced a system called Narrative Cage Match (NCM) that differs from traditional role-playing game systems in that there is no referee or gamemaster. Players control a character that co-operates and competes with other characters to try to steer the course of the story so that their character finishes in a better position than all the others. Players influence the narrative outcomes of the games they are playing using a bidding mechanism that uses beads and traditional six-sided dice.

== Games ==
Pantheon includes 5 games called:

- Grave and Watery - Action and horror in an undersea base.
- Boardroom Blitz - Players battle for control of a family megacorporation.
- The Big Hole - Modern-day gangsters in a tale of crime, revenge and blackmail.
- Destroy all Buildings - Giant monsters ravage Tokyo.
- Pantheon - Create the universe.

== New Style ==
Pantheon was one in a series of experimental/alternative role-playing games published by Hogshead Publishing. Other games in the series included the award-nominated The Extraordinary Adventures of Baron Münchhausen, Violence, and Puppetland/Powerkill.

== Reviews ==
- Pyramid

== Sources ==
- "Review of Pantheon and Other Roleplaying Games". RPGnet. Archived from the original on September 14, 2001.
- "Review of Pantheon and Other Roleplaying Games". RPGnet. Archived from the original on January 21, 2003.
- New Style Games
