= Rune (role-playing game) =

Tabletop fantasy role-playing game by Robin Laws

Rune is a role-playing game published by Atlas Games in 2001.

== Description ==
Atlas Games contracted Robin Laws to write the Rune role-playing game, based on the computer game Rune. Laws determined that for Rune, "the game would need to have a big point of difference to distinguish it from the many other fantasy games available"; in this case, the game would allow players to swap roles with the Game Master (GM): "You can win! And when you're not the GM, it's not boring because the GM can win!"

== Publication history ==
Rune was published by Atlas Games in 2001.

== Reviews ==
- Pyramid review
- Backstab #32
- Realms of Fantasy
