= Hillfolk =

2013 Tabletop role-playing game by Robin Laws

- Designers: Robin Laws
- Publishers: Pelgrane Press
- Publication: 2013; 13 years ago
- Genres: Social roleplaying
- Systems: Dramasystem

Hillfolk is a tabletop role-playing game designed by Robin Laws and published by Pelgrane Press. It was initially launched via Kickstarter in 2012, with the funding being sufficiently successful that a second book called "Blood on the Snow", containing 33 new settings, was produced as a part of the kickstarter. Reception was positive, with RPGamer saying "mechanics don't so much get out of the way of roleplay as provide a supportive foundation for it to happen." Hillfolk is influenced by the Indie RPGs of the 2000s, and emphasises relationships and interpersonal conflicts among the player characters, rather than what the system calls "procedural" scenes putting the characters against external obstacles.

As a result of the successful Kickstarter, Hillfolk incorporated additional settings by Jason Morningstar, Ken Hite, Matt Forbeck, and Emily Care Boss, among others. The game won the Indie RPG awards for Game of the Year and Best Support for 2013 and the 2014 Diana Jones award for excellence in gaming.
