= Rune (video game) =

2000 action-adventure video game

- Developer: Human Head Studios (Note: Ported to Mac OS by Westlake Interactive. Ported to Linux by Loki Software.)
- Publisher: NA: Gathering of Developers (PC); Take-Two Interactive (Note: Linux version published by Loki Software)
- Producer: Timothy Gerritsen
- Programmer: Paul MacArthur
- Artist: Ted Halsted
- Engine: Unreal Engine
- Platforms: Microsoft Windows; Mac OS; Linux; PlayStation 2
- Release: Windows: NA: October 27, 2000; EU: November 3, 2000; Mac OS; December 4, 2000; Linux; June 21, 2001; PlayStation 2: NA: July 30, 2001; EU: October 5, 2001
- Genre: Action-adventure
- Modes: Single-player, multiplayer

Rune is an action-adventure video game developed by Human Head Studios which was released in 2000. The game is based on Ragnarok, showing the conflict between the Gods Odin and Loki and the buildup to Ragnarok. Built on the Unreal Engine, the game casts the player as Ragnar, a young Viking warrior whose mettle is tested when Loki and his evil allies plot to destroy the world and bring about Ragnarok.

Upon release, Rune received generally positive reviews. A standalone expansion pack for the game, Rune: Halls of Valhalla, was released in 2001. Both the base game and expansion were ported to Linux by Loki Software. Ryan C. Gordon, a former Loki employee, would also later port Human Head's 2006 title Prey. A port to the PlayStation 2 was also released under the title Rune: Viking Warlord in 2001. The game was re-released digitally under the name Rune Classic in 2012, with the expansion included. A sequel, Rune II, was released in 2019.

A pen-and-paper adaptation of Rune was published by Atlas Games.

== Gameplay ==
The game casts the player as Ragnar, a young Viking warrior. It follows a fantasy plot based on Norse mythology. The various enemies Ragnar faces include man-eating fish, goblins, zombies, Norse dwarves and other Vikings. As the game goes on, as in most games of its type, better weapons are accumulated. Late in the game the player wields weapons of enormous size, even though most weapons maintain their usefulness to the end. Runes are strewn around the game world. When collected, they add to the player's rune power.

Weapons in Rune are divided into three categories: swords, axes, and maces/hammers. Each of the three classes have five weapons, increasing in size as the game progresses. Each weapon has a unique "Rune Power" that can be activated for a short period of time when the player has enough rune power. Shields may be equipped along with the first three weapons of each class. Weapons of tier 4 and 5 are two-handed, and may not be used along with shields. Besides these standard weapons, other items such as torches and severed limbs may also be equipped to be used as weapons. While high-tier weapons tend to be preferable in singleplayer games, all tiers are considered somewhat equal for multiplayer situations due to balancing factors such as speed.

Depending on the direction of Ragnar's movement, weapons can be thrust, swung overhead, or slashed. Repeated strikes unleash a powerful spinning attack. All weapons may be thrown, and deal as much damage when thrown as a melee attack. When Ragnar has killed enough enemies in a short span of time, he enters a brief "Berserk Mode", which allows him to resist damage and hit harder. There is also a special rune which instantly activates Berserk Mode.

Although rather linear, Ragnar does not need to kill everything in sight (common in games of the time) to travel from one level to the next. In some levels, players have found alternative ways of getting through to the next level. However, particular scripted pawns must be activated (killed, moved or tripped) in key zones to initiate certain actions to continue and move the story along.

=== Multiplayer ===
Rune features several multiplayer modes, typical for the time, such as Deathmatch, Team Deathmatch, and so on. The expansion, Halls of Valhalla, added one unique mode, which is inspired by football; the players are split into team, and score points by dismembering players in the opposing team, picking up their body-parts, and throwing them into the goal. It is a game of spatial orientation in which opponents manoeuvre around each other, swinging in and out of range and attempting to score hits on each other. There are a variety of attacks available to the player at any one time, dictated by the weapon they hold at that moment. The geometries of each swing are immutable – thus players are able to fine tune their movement to the precision of a few pixels, and accurately behead their opponents. Over the years, Rune developed a thriving and competitive clan community, with players from all over the world joining servers, playing together, and forming clans.

== Story ==
The story begins when the player, as Ragnar, is initiated into the Odinsblade, an order of warriors sworn to protect the runestones, magical creations of Odin which bind the evil god, Loki and prevent him from unleashing Ragnarok – the end of the world. Ragnar has completed his initiation by beating the great warrior Ulf in combat, when a warrior bursts into the scene and informs the two that a Viking known as Conrack is leading a raid on an allied village. Ragnar and the rest of his village's warriors are assembled into a longship to do battle.

They encounter Conrack's longship, and Ragnar's father is about to order his men to attack, when Conrack calls upon Loki and destroys the ship with a thunderbolt. The ship sinks, killing all on board but Ragnar, who receives a message from Odin that it is not his time to die. Recovered, he swims to safety in an underwater cave. Ragnar fights his way through the monster-riddled caverns. He eventually enters the land of the dead, domain of Loki's daughter Hel.

Passing through the Underworld and facing the ghastly undead, Ragnar learns the enemy's plan: Conrack's carnage sends many dishonored souls to Hel's domain, who in turn gives them to Loki to transform into an army which will conquer the world. After fighting his way through Hel, Ragnar is captured by goblins and fights their beast in the trial pit. He defeats the beast and escapes goblin lands riding on a giant flying beetle. When he emerges from the caverns, he stands before Thorstadt, the mountain fortress of Conrack, and fights his way through it to a Temple of Loki. Inside, Sigurd – Conrack's right arm – confronts his master about all the destruction and asks him to drop the charade of worshipping Loki. Conrack states that Sigurd has outlived his usefulness, and sends two of the transformed dishonored to kill him, then escapes. Ragnar enters the scene and stands before the dying warrior. Sigurd informs Ragnar that he is the last of the Odinsblade, and saving the world is up to him, then dies.

Ragnar follows Conrack, and ends up in the land of the Dwarves. In Rune, Dwarves are depicted as short, stocky, purple beings. He travels through the industrial powerhouse of the dwarven land and learns that the dwarves are supplying weaponry and armor for Loki's new sinister armies. Odin then tasks Ragnar to murder the dwarf king, whose will holds the dwarves' allegiance to Loki together. The king has apparently proclaimed himself a semi-god, and resides in a great temple dedicated to himself. Ragnar enters battle with the king, and he uses the great machine that gives the king his powers to destroy him.

Ragnar travels deep below the earth and to the castle of Loki himself. Odin tells Ragnar that even he will not be able to contact him whilst he transverses through Loki's realm. Ragnar discovers that it is Loki's blood that transforms Hel's undead warriors to the monsters of Loki's armies. He passes through the castle and Loki's maze, arriving at the holding chamber of Loki himself. It is here Ragnar faces Conrack at last. Ragnar knocks the rogue Viking into a river of Loki's blood, which seems poised to kill him. However, the great stone snake which binds Loki drips acid onto his gaping chest wound and the green blood turns purple. Conrack rises out of the river, reborn in Loki's image as a hideous monster. Conrack reveals to Ragnar that Loki's armies are invading Midgard and destroying Odin's runestones left and right. He escapes with a great leap. After a tussle with some undead, Ragnar dives into the river, emerging as a mighty giant.

Loki tries to persuade Ragnar to join his side. He refuses and goes after Conrack. He escapes from Loki's castle and makes his way through caverns out into the world above. He then stands witness to the devastation wrought by Loki's armies. Loki mocks him, but he presses on. His fellow warriors no longer recognize him, and attack him on sight. Ragnar finally arrives home, only to see it totally destroyed. Loki offers one last time to join him, and Conrack sends his men forward to destroy the runestone and Ragnar. There are two possible outcomes of the game, depending on what the player does here.

In the canonical good ending, Ragnar bests Conrack and his men. Odin speaks to Ragnar, telling him that the people of his village are safe in the hands of his servant Bragi. He informs Ragnar that he has succeeded and Ragnarok has been averted. Loki, full of bitterness and rage, has his cave filled in by Odin, thwarted for the time being. Odin then opens up a portal in his last runestone, telling Ragnar to step through and join him at his side as the first living warrior to enter Asgard. Complying, Ragnar enters Odin's realm and finds himself restored to his human form. Beckoned by Odin, Ragnar runs over Bifröst and enters the Halls of Valhalla.

In the evil ending, Ragnar strides up the hill toward the last runestone and shatters it. As soon as this happens, Loki is freed from his underground prison. The last we see of Ragnar is that he is crucified in Loki's lair. Loki then takes over all of Midgard.

== Development ==
The game was developed with 15 people. The genesis of Rune occurred while Ted Halsted and Shane Gurno were working at Raven Software. Halsted, who had always been fascinated by Vikings, took inspiration from the Icelandic Völsunga saga. Halsted, Gurno and four others left Raven to found Human Head Studios, and soon found work developing a sequel to Daikatana using the Unreal Engine. When that project fell through, the Viking idea was revived and work began on Rune with the publisher Gathering of Developers.

Epic Games allowed Human Head to keep using the Unreal Engine originally licensed for the Daikatana project. The two developers collaboratively made several enhancements to it, including a skeletal animation system, a new particle effects system, and an enhanced shadowing system. Although made using the Unreal Engine, Rune is a third-person perspective game without any shooting. The weapons used in the game include swords, axes, maces, and other medieval fantasy melee weapons. Despite using an engine made for shooting, the interface lends itself well to a playing style consisting of running, jumping, and hacking at opponents. Although the game includes no ranged weapons, any weapon can be thrown.

An innovative feature of the game is that anything dropped by a dead opponent (body parts included) can be picked up and used. Limbs can be swung as clubs, and heads can be carried and used as weapons. Enemies whose sword arms have been chopped off will run away from battle.

Both Rune and Rune: Halls of Valhalla were released with their own RuneEd toolkits which the community quickly used making several popular multiplayer mods (coop, CTT—capture the torch, 'bots, etc.). Although a few single player addons have been made, it is Rune's multiplayer aspect has been the focus of several mutators, skins, and hundreds of maps that are available through many clan and resource websites. In 2004, the source header files were released freely by Human Head.

== Release ==
Rune shipped for Windows on October 27, 2000. A playable demo was released at the same time. Developed by Westlake Interactive, the Mac OS version followed on December 4, 2000. Loki Software released a Linux port on June 21, 2001. In October 2001, Rune was re-released with the HOV expansion included, as Rune Gold. A Dreamcast port of the game had been planned, but was eventually cancelled.

Human Head Studios would also feature new multiplayer levels for Rune online.

A pen-and-paper adaptation was released by Atlas Games, whom Tim Gerritsen had approached at GenCon.

Rune's original master server was shut down in 2014 but online play is still possible with community's support.

== Reception ==
Reception

Aggregate score
Aggregator	Score	
Aggregator	PC	PS2
Metacritic	76/100	53/100

Review scores
Publication	Score	
Publication	PC	PS2
CNET Gamecenter	9/10	N/A
Computer Gaming World	2.5/5	N/A
Electronic Gaming Monthly	N/A	4/10
EP Daily	6.5/10	N/A
Eurogamer	7/10	N/A
Game Informer	7.75/10	7.25/10
GameRevolution	A−	D
GameSpot	6.7/10	4.9/10
GameSpy	90%	68%
IGN	8/10	5.5/10
Next Generation	3/5	2/5
Official U.S. PlayStation Magazine	N/A	2.5/5
PC Gamer (US)	67%	N/A
X-Play	3/5	2/5

The original PC version of Rune received "generally favorable reviews" according to the review aggregation website Metacritic.

Critics generally thought the game was good, but not great, and required the player to adjust their expectations. A common point of criticism was the enemy artificial intelligence. Opponents would simply gang up on the player without bothering to use tactics. Enemy variety was also found wanting.

Praise was however given to the graphics, especially the crisp textures, and the detailed limb-hacking violence was appreciated.

The multiplayer was thought middling. Although many appreciated the cathartic fun of running around lopping the heads off other players, the lack of game modes and problems with lag interfered with the enjoyment.

Jim Preston of NextGen said of the game in its February 2001 issue, "Rune fails to impress. The shaky gameplay undermines the first-rate visuals and ripping good story." Brian Wright of GamePro said, "What Rune does offer is a fun, albeit not too original, action/platform-style game with hours and hours of gameplay." (Note: GamePro gave the PC version 5/5 for graphics, 4/5 for sound, 4.5/5 for control, and 3.5/5 for fun factor.)

John Brandon of GameZone gave the game a score of eight out of ten, calling it "a brawny game without a huge emphasis on brains – although Viking warriors toward the end of the game are challenging enough. There's a lot of visceral, visual enjoyment here – a near-perfect antidote to a long workday." Michael Tresca of AllGame gave it three-and-a-half stars out of five, saying, "Despite good graphics and excellent sound, Rune falls short of its potential due to various flaws, glitches, and a lack of variation over the long haul." However, Benjamin E. Sones of Computer Games Strategy Plus gave it two-and-a-half stars out of five, saying that it was "too long and uninspiring to hold your attention. The game would have been far more entertaining with half as many levels. More can be better... but only if it's good."

The game sold 49,000 units in the U.S. by October 2001.

The game was nominated for the Action Game of the Year award at the CNET Gamecenter Computer Game Awards for 2000, which went to MechWarrior 4: Vengeance.

== Expansion and PS2 version ==
The Rune multiplayer component was expanded with the 2001 release of the stand-alone expansion pack Rune: Halls of Valhalla. It adds two new modes: "Head Ball" is a variant of capture the flag with body parts standing in for flags; "Arena" is a duel-centric deathmatch mode. The developers drew inspiration from the violent sport of the Aztecs, in which the losing team of a ball game was decapitated. 37 new maps in total are included: 20 for deathmatch, 8 for Head Ball, and 9 for Arena. Some of these maps were the winners of a four-week competition for fans of the game to create their own maps using the level editor. Sixteen new character models are available, some of them female. The Wren Valkyrie model is based on a fan of Rune who ended up getting hired as site director of the official Rune website. The soundtrack is also expanded.

Rune: Viking Warlord is the PlayStation 2 port of Rune, released in 2001 by Take-Two Interactive. It contains a few extra maps and enemies, but is otherwise a straight port. It was released in North America on July 30, 2001 and in the United Kingdom on October 5.

The PlayStation 2 port received "mixed" reviews according to Metacritic. It was criticized for inferior graphics to the original and long loading times. Whatever their opinion of the multiplayer on PC, critics disliked the multiplayer on PS2. In NextGen's October 2001 issue, Preston called it "Another disc on the already enormous heap of mediocre PS2 games." Dylan Parrotta of GameZone gave it 4.5 out of 10, saying, "Though I could not find a stopwatch I would say that I spent around a quarter of my time in the confines of the load screen."

== Sequel ==
Human Head was considering a sequel as early as 2000. Rune II had been negotiated with an unnamed publisher during the early-to-mid-2000s. In 2012, Human Head Studios indicated that it was considering making a sequel to Rune. A sequel titled Rune: Ragnarok was announced to be in production by Human Head in August 2017. In March 2018, the Ragnarok subtitle was dropped and the title was renamed Rune. By May 2019, Human Head renamed the title again as Rune II, with a target release for Windows in mid-2019 through the Epic Games Store. The partnership with Epic Games enabled Human Head to acquire additional funding to finish out their more expansive version of the game, according to studio head Chris Rhinehart.

The game was pushed back and was released on November 12, 2019, under publisher Ragnarok Game LLC. Immediately after the game's release, Human Head Studios was shuttered and a new studio, Roundhouse Studios, was formed with the staff of Human Head Studios under management with Bethesda Softworks. Ragnarok stated they were unaware of Human Head's closure until that day but remained committed to providing ongoing support and releases outside Epic Games Store through 2020. By December 2019, Ragnarok had filed a lawsuit against the former Human Head staff for failing to provide the final source code and assets for Rune II following the studio's surprise closure upon their request, as well as US$100 million in damages relating to the poor state in which Rune II was released at launch and to cover the game's post-launch support period which Human Head was to have done. Ragnarok had received the source code back from the former Human Head staff by January 2020, but still intend to follow through with the lawsuit. By October 2020, Ragnarok had expanded the lawsuit to include both ZeniMax and Bethesda as parties to the suit, alleging they had defrauded Ragnarok and sabotaged the development of two games.
