= Ashen Stars =

Tabletop science fiction role-playing game by Robin Laws

Ashen Stars is a gritty space opera role-playing game published by Pelgrane Press in 2011.

== Description ==
Ashen Stars uses the GUMSHOE rules system. The characters are freelance interplanetary law enforcement and general troubleshooters, working in the remote region known as the Bleed.

== Publication history ==
Robin Laws designed Ashen Stars (2011) for Pelgrane Press's GUMSHOE system.

The Accretion Disk supplement was published in 2015.

== Reception ==
Ashen Stars was a 2011 nominee for the Origins Award for best role-playing game.

Ashen Stars won the 2012 Silver Ennie Award for "Best Setting".

John ONeill of Black Gate comments: "Drawing heavily upon his successful GUMSHOE mystery system, author Robin D. Laws has created an extremely appealing game of space opera procedural mysteries. In the tradition of the best hard boiled detective fiction, players are constantly scrambling for money, equipment, and respect... all of which they'll need to succeed in a war-ravaged perimeter where trust is a precious commodity, and very little is truly what it seems."
