= Madness at Gardmore Abbey =

Dungeons & Dragons companion book

- Author: James Wyatt, Creighton Broadhurst, Steve Townshend
- Genre: Role-playing game
- Publisher: Wizards of the Coast
- Publication date: September 2011
- Media type: Box set
- Pages: 128
- ISBN: 9780786958726

Madness at Gardmore Abbey is an adventure for the 4th edition of the Dungeons & Dragons role-playing game. It was the third super-adventure for the edition and it was part of the Essentials line.

== Contents ==
Madness at Gardmore Abbey is a heroic-tier adventure for characters of levels 6–8. The box set includes:

- "Four 32-page books describing Gardmore Abbey and its inhabitants, along with quests and encounters",
- two "double-sided battle maps depicting key adventure locations",
- two "die-cut sheets of cardstock tokens and dungeon tiles",
- and "the Deck of Many Things (22 cards) plus 2 exclusive Treasure Cards".

The Deck of Many Things cards "are drawn to determine specific elements of the adventure, such as who the villain is. This was an old trick first used by Tracy Hickman in classic adventures such as I6: "Ravenloft" (1983) and Dragonlance (1984–1986), but it hadn't been seen in quite a while when it made a return in Madness".

== Publication history ==
Madness at Gardmore Abbey was published by Wizards of the Coast in September 2011. It was written by James Wyatt with Creighton Broadhurst and Steve Townshend.

Shannon Appelcline, author of Designers & Dragons, wrote "lead designer James Wyatt used a description of the Gardbury Downs from the Dungeon Master's Kit (2010) as the basis of this adventure. It detailed the ruins of a monastery that had been brought down by a 'dark artifact'. Wyatt decided that the artifact was the infamous Deck of Many Things … and went from there. [...] [Wyatt] wrote the overall design of Madness at Gardmore Abbey while he handed off the encounters to his designers. [...] Creighton took on the Abbey's Inner Encounters (Book 3), and Townshend wrote the Abbey's Outer Encounters (Book 4)".

It was re-released as a PDF on August 4, 2015. On July 4, 2018, Mike Mearls, co-lead designer for the 5th edition of Dungeons & Dragons, said "Madness at Gardmore Abbey from 4e is a good adventure, well worth finding on the DMs Guild. You know this is an honest opinion because I woke up at 7:30 AM on a holiday to keep reading it".

== Related products ==
=== The Siege of Gardmore Abbey ===
The August 2011 Pax Prime convention featured a prequel adventure written and designed by Townshend called The Siege of Gardmore Abbey. While it was an adventure detailing the fall of the Gardmore Abbey, the prequel was actually written after Madness at Gardmore Abbey was developed. In January 2012, the adventure was released in Dungeon #210.

=== Deck of Many Things ===
Appelcline highlighted that, of the components the box set included, the Deck of Many Things was "the most interesting component". The Deck of Many Things "premiered in Supplement I: Greyhawk (1975) and has returned in various Dungeon Master's Guides (1979, 1989, 2000, 2003) over the years, clearly revealing it as one of D&D's most popular magic items. A physical deck had been published once before, as an insert in Dragon #148 (August 1989). The deck had also previously appeared in D&D 4e as a paragon-level artifact, in Dungeon #177 (April 2010). Now it was reappearing in a new form as a heroic-level artifact".

== Reception ==
Madness at Gardmore Abbey won the 2012 Silver ENnie Award for "Best Adventure" and "Best Cartography".

Appelcline wrote that "Madness at Gardmore Abbey may have been the best-loved adventure of the 4e era". He pointed to specific design elements of the adventure that innovated on the traditional 4th edition linear encounter-based and tactical format: "Madness at Gardmore Abbey kept to that format but rather impressively used it to create a sandbox adventure. [...] Madness pulls off this trick with the use of patrons who give out quests. In fact, two of the four adventure books focus on patrons, rivals, and the physical details of the Abbey, creating a sandbox full of options. The Encounters then fit into that sandbox, as the players choose the particular directions that they want to explore. However, the sandboxing of Madness goes deeper than a set of patron-quests. When Wyatt wrote out his order for the Encounters, he told his designers that he didn't want a 'combat slog', but instead a 'mix of combat, roleplaying, and skill challenges'. Thus, Madness is one of the most varied of all the 4e adventures, even within the constraints of individual encounters".
