= Night's Watch (Green Ronin Publishing) =

Role-playing game supplement

Night's Watch is a 2012 role-playing game supplement published by Green Ronin Publishing for A Song of Ice and Fire Roleplaying.

== Contents ==
Night's Watch details the members of the Night's Watch guard.

== Reception ==
Night's Watch won the 2013 Origins Award for Best Roleplaying Supplement.

Night's Watch won the 2013 Gold ENnie Award for Best Aid/Accessory.
