= The Esoterrorists =

Tabletop horror role-playing game by Robin Laws

- Second edition cover
- Designers: Robin D. Laws
- Publishers: Pelgrane Press
- Publication: 2006; 20 years ago
- Genres: Contemporary Occult
- Systems: GUMSHOE System
- Website: The Esoterrorists
- ISBN: 978-1908983527

The Esoterrorists is a contemporary occult tabletop role-playing game, written by Robin D. Laws, and published by Pelgrane Press in 2006.

== Description ==
The Esoterrorists is one of the games to use the GUMSHOE System. As elite investigators of the Ordo Veritatis, the characters combat occult terrorists who are intent on tearing the fabric of the world by exposing it to the creatures of the Outer Dark.

Investigative build points are used for the setting, with two players receiving 32 points each, while five or more players receive 20 points each. Any number of investigative build points can be spent on an investigative ability, though more than 3 or 4 points is rarely useful. Players receive 60 general build points each. Any number of general build points can be spent on a general ability, as long as the second highest rated ability is at least half that of the highest rated. After a scenario is completed, player characters receive new build points that can be used as either investigative or general build points. The amount acquired depends on the length of the scenario. There are no levels through which player characters progress.

== Publication history ==
Pelgrane Press began their GUMSHOE system line with The Esoterrorists (2006), which was supported by the sourcebook The Esoterror Factbook (2006) by Robin Laws. A second edition was released in August 2013.

== Reception ==
The Esoterrorists was nominated for both Best Game and Best Rules in the 2007 Ennie Awards.

== Reviews ==
- Pyramid
- Rebel Times #1
  - Rebel Times #46 (The Esoterror Factbook expansion)
- RPGnet
