= Simon Rogers (publisher) =

British software developer and publisher

Simon J. Rogers
- Occupation: Publisher

Simon J Rogers is a software developer and publisher who has worked primarily on cartography software and role-playing games.

== Career ==
Simon Rogers and Mark Fulford founded the company ProFantasy Software in 1993 to publish Campaign Cartographer (1993) as a professional map-making program marketed to role-playing game players. Pelgrane Press was formed in 1999, and was initially owned by Rogers, ProFantasy Software, and Sasha Bilton. Rogers acquired the license to the Dying Earth world by Jack Vance for use by Pelgrane Press, which published The Dying Earth Roleplaying Game in 2001.
