= The Dying Earth Roleplaying Game =

Tabletop fantasy role-playing game by Robin Laws

- Cover by Greg Staples
- Designers: Robin Laws
- Publishers: Pelgrane Press
- Publication: 2001; 25 years ago
- Genres: Fantasy

The Dying Earth Roleplaying Game is a tabletop role-playing game published by Pelgrane Press in 2001.

== Description ==
The Dying Earth Roleplaying Game is an adaptation of Jack Vance's Dying Earth novel series. The game situates players in Vance's world populated by desperately extravagant people.

== Publication history ==
Pelgrane Press signed a contract with Robin Laws on 1 November 1999, and revealed on 20 January 2000 that Laws would be the core author of their upcoming roleplaying game based on the Jack Vance stories in the Dying Earth setting. Laws was the senior designer for The Dying Earth Roleplaying Game, and a sourcebook for the setting titled White-Walled Kaiin. Phil Masters also contributed articles to The Excellent Prismatic Spray, a magazine supporting The Dying Earth Roleplaying Game by Pelgrane Press.

After a number of releases in the Dying Earth line, by these authors and others, the license for the RPG was allowed to expire in 2009. However, sales in response to the "closing out" sale held by Pelgrane Press were so strong, that the license was renewed in 2010 and expanded to cover the Gaean Reach books, and a new Gaean Reach RPG by Robin Laws was released at the end of 2011 which incorporated certain elements of the GUMSHOE system alongside the Dying Earth mechanics.

== Reception ==
Shannon Appelcline comments: "The Dying Earth Roleplaying game is an RPG that does a superb job of capturing the feel of Jack Vance's foundational fantasy books. If you've always wanted to engage in amoral behavior under a wavering sun, this is your opportunity."

In a review of The Dying Earth Roleplaying Game in Black Gate, John ONeill said "there's plenty to enjoy about The Dying Earth RPG, even if you never use the rules to guide your dice arm" and noted that "The support materials were superb".

== Other reviews ==
- Pyramid review
- Alarums & Excursions, #402 (Mar 2009, p.38) and #403 (April 2009, p.39)
- Imazine, #37 (January 2002, p.4)
- Warpstone, Issue 20 (Summer 2003, p. 2)
- Games Unplugged, Issue 8 (June 2001, P.21)
- Backstab #30
- Backstab #47
- Syfy
- Realms of Fantasy
