= The Last Province =

The Last Province is a British role-playing game magazine that was published from 1992 to 1993.

== Contents ==
The Last Province was a short‑lived independent magazine that published five bi‑monthly issues featuring news, reviews, articles, scenarios, and a cartoon strip.

== Reviews ==
- Abyss Quarterly #50 (Winter, 1992)
- Shadis #12
