= Gareth Hanrahan =

Irish game designer and novelist

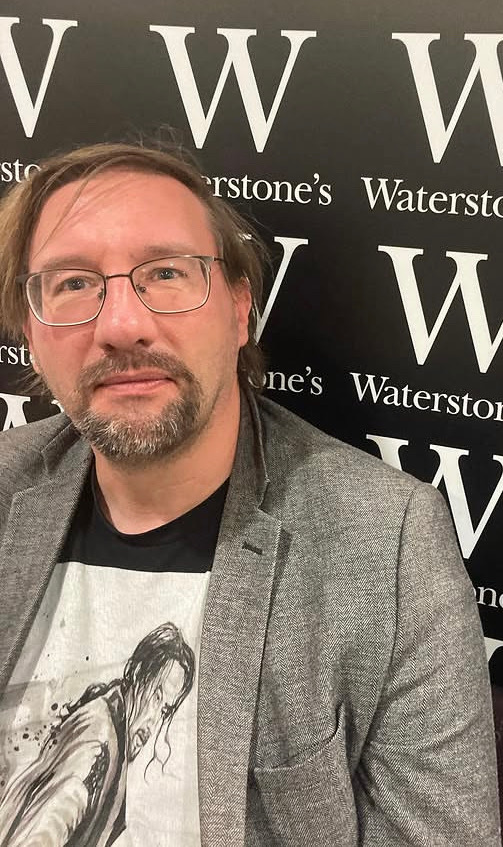
- Hanrahan signing his book in the Cork Waterstones in 2025
- Occupations: Game designer, author

Gareth Ryder-Hanrahan is an Irish game designer and novelist who has worked primarily on role-playing games.

== Career ==
=== Games ===
Hanrahan was one of the game designers included in the experimental community connected to the Gaming Outpost. Hanrahan oversaw the writing for Paranoia when Mongoose Publishing brought it in-house. Hanrahan wrote the fifth RuneQuest setting from Mongoose, Hawkmoon: The Roleplaying Game (2007). Hanrahan wrote the Traveller Core Rulebook (2008), which was able to outsell RuneQuest and become the new #1 game from Mongoose. Hanrahan wrote the 12th-century setting Deus Vult (2010) which became one of the settings that received new support in RuneQuest II. Hanrahan was one of the employees let go in the layoffs which resulted when Mongoose separated from Rebellion in March 2010.

Hanrahan helped Pelgrane Press support their GUMSHOE System by producing monthly supplements, beginning in late 2010. Cubicle 7 expanded its staff in 2011 by hiring industry insiders such as Hanrahan, Walt Ciechanowski, Charles Ryan, and Neil Ford. He is currently employed as a full-time writer for Pelgrane Press. He also holds the position of line developer for The Laundry Files roleplaying game published by Cubicle 7.

=== Fiction ===
Hanrahan is the author of the Paranoia novel Reality Optional. He has also contributed short stories to the Stone Skin Press anthologies The Lion and the Aardvark and Schemers.

He released his debut novel in 2019, and its sequels in the Black Iron Legacy series in 2020 and 2021:

- The Gutter Prayer, Orbit, January 22, 2019
- The Shadow Saint, Orbit, January 7, 2020
- The Broken God, Orbit, May 18, 2021

The series is a gothic/steampunk adventure, set in the city of Guerdon, which has been described as being inspired by Hanrahan's native city of Cork.

His second trilogy, Lands of the Firstborn, is set years after a band a heroes defeated the Dark Lord, having to come together once more to overcome a new threat.

- The Sword Defiant, Orbit, May 2023 ISBN 9780356516530
- The Sword Unbound, Orbit, May 2024 ISBN 9780356516547
- The Sword Triumphant, Orbit, May 2025 ISBN 9780356516561

== Awards and nominations ==
Hanrahan has received the following ENnie awards:

- 2011: Best New Game (Silver), The Laundry RPG by Cubicle 7
- 2012: Best Rules (Silver), Lorefinder: GUMSHOE Pathfinder Mashup by Pelgrane Press

Hanrahan has received the following ENnie nominations:

- 2012: Best Adventure, Dead Rock Seven by Pelgrane Press
- 2012: Best Adventure, Invasive Procedures by Pelgrane Press
- 2013: Best Adventure, The Zalozhniy Quartet by Pelgrane Press

Hanrahan has received the following Origins nominations:

- 2014: Best RPG Supplement, The Heart of the Wild by Cubicle 7

== Games ==
Games designed / written by Hanrahan include:

- The Slayer's Guide to Titans (2003)
- The Quintessential Halfling (2003)
- The Quintessential Paladin II: Advanced Tactics (2004)
- The Quintessential Druid II (2004)
- OGL Horror (2004)
- The Traitor's Manual (2004), Paranoia RPG
- EarthForce Campaign Book (2005), Babylon 5 Roleplaying Game
- Conan: The Roleplaying Game (2007, 2nd edition)
- The Laundry (2010)
- Primeval: The Role-Playing Game (2011)
- Eyes of the Stone Thief (2015), 13th Age RPG
