= Paizo =

American game publisher

Paizo Inc.
- Founded: 2002
- Founders: Lisa Stevens; Vic Wertz; Johnny Wilson
- Country of origin: United States
- Headquarters location: Redmond, Washington
- Distribution: Diamond Book Distributors (until 2026); Independent Publishers Group (2026-)
- Key people: Lisa Stevens (Advisory CEO); Jim Butler (President)
- Publication types: Role-playing games, board games, books
- Fiction genres: science fiction, fantasy
- Official website: paizo.com

Paizo Inc. (/ˈpaɪzoʊ/; originally Paizo Publishing) is an American role-playing game publishing company based in Redmond, Washington, best known for the tabletop role-playing games Pathfinder and Starfinder. The company's name is derived from the Greek word παίζω (paízō) which means 'I play' or 'to play'. Paizo also runs an online retail store selling role-playing games, board games, comic books, toys, clothing, accessories and other products, as well as an internet forum community.

== History ==
Paizo was formed by Lisa Stevens, Vic Wertz, and Johnny Wilson in 2002 to take over the publication of the Dungeons & Dragons magazines Dragon and Dungeon, formerly published in-house by Wizards of the Coast. Paizo publisher Erik Mona is the former editor-in-chief of Dragon, while former editor-in-chief of Dungeon James Jacobs oversees the Pathfinder periodicals.

The company started producing a bimonthly magazine called Undefeated in 2003, and in 2004, resurrected the venerable science fiction title Amazing Stories. The two publications were placed on hiatus in 2005, and finally canceled in 2006.

In early 2007, Wizards of the Coast announced it would not renew Paizo's license to publish Dragon and Dungeon, leaving a five-year run from September 2002 to September 2007.

Paizo has subsequently began the periodical Pathfinder Adventure Path, which continues the concept featured in Dungeon of monthly installments of adventures that tell a self-contained story. These Adventure Paths are set in the world of Golarion, the official Pathfinder campaign setting. Paizo announced on March 18, 2008 that they would be launching the Pathfinder Roleplaying Game. Through the new product line, Paizo would modify and update the System Reference Document version 3.5 under the terms of Wizards of the Coast's Open Game License. The Pathfinder Roleplaying Game would also support Paizo's Pathfinder campaign setting. In March 2008, Paizo also announced that it was introducing an organized play program called "Pathfinder Society Organized Play". The program was loosely modeled on the RPGAs "Living" campaigns. Additional products in the Pathfinder line include Pathfinder modules and Pathfinder Tales novels.

In May 2016, Paizo announced a new space fantasy role-playing game, Starfinder Roleplaying Game, released in August 2017. It is set in a possible future of the Pathfinder setting where Golarion has disappeared.

In May 2018, Paizo announced it was working on a second edition of Pathfinder to refine elements of the rule set to reflect feedback and clarification on the original system over the prior years. The preliminary ruleset was published in August 2018 as Pathfinder Playtest so that players could test out and provide feedback. The final rule set was released on August 1, 2019.

On June 15, 2020, Paizo announced CEO Lisa Stevens was going to step down from daily operations in preparation for her retirement.

Other Paizo products include the Titanic Games line of board games such as Kill Doctor Lucky, and the Planet Stories line of classic fantasy, science fiction and science fantasy novels.

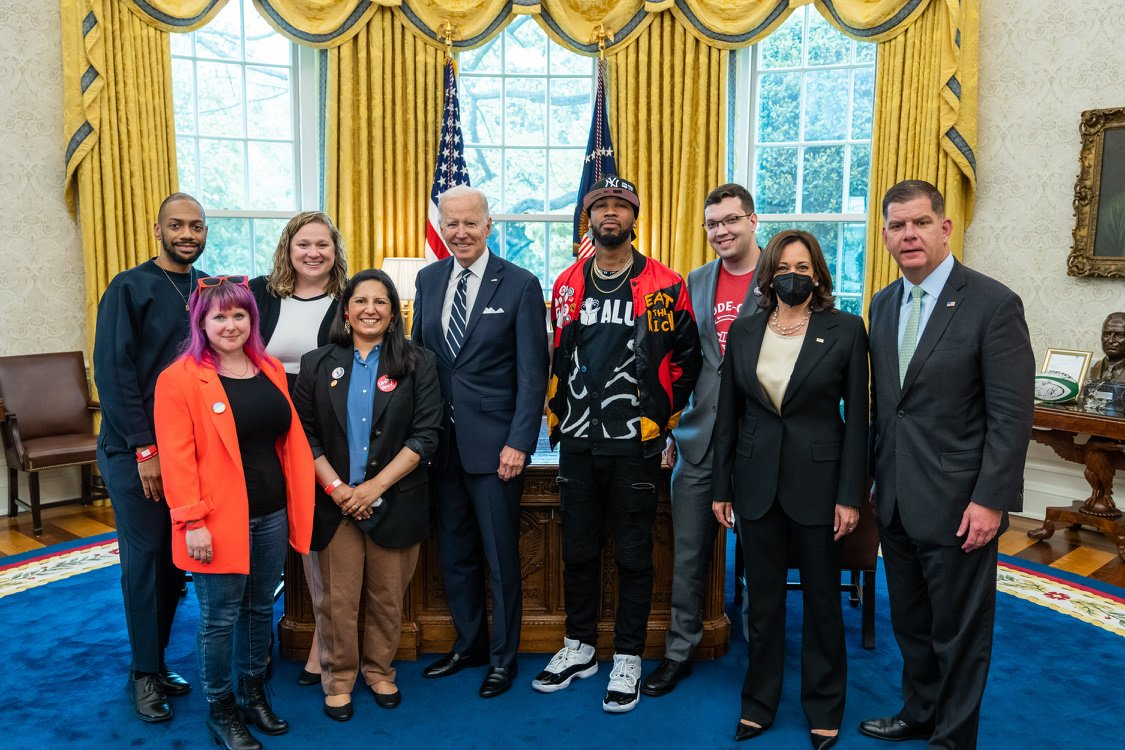
Alex Speidel (3rd from right) of the United Paizo Workers and other grassroot union organizers meet with President Joe Biden and Vice President Kamala Harris in May 2022

On October 14, 2021, an organization representing over 30 Paizo employees announced the formation of the United Paizo Workers, a labor union allied with the Communications Workers of America, becoming the first such tabletop game company to have such a union. The employees stated that recent issues related to "managerial impropriety" was a driver for the unionization effort. Paizo voluntarily agreed to recognize the union, allowing collective bargaining negotiations between the company and union to commence.

Leaked documents from Wizard of the Coast in January 2023 suggested that Wizards planned to change the Open Game License (OGL), developed for its Dungeons & Dragons products and which Paizo's products are predicated on, to be more restrictive and potentially harm third-party content creators, including Paizo. In response, Paizo announced plans for a new license called the Open RPG Creative License (ORC). Additional publishers, such as Kobold Press, Chaosium, Green Ronin, Legendary Games, and Rogue Genius Games, were to be part of the ORC development process. The ORC is be an open, perpetual, and irrevocable system-agnostic license with legal development paid for by Paizo "under the legal guidance of Azora Law"; however, the license "will not be owned by Paizo, nor will it be owned by any company who makes money publishing RPGs". Paizo planned to find a "nonprofit with a history of open source values to own this license" and stated that "Azora Law's ownership of the process and stewardship should provide a safe harbor against any company being bought, sold, or changing management in the future and attempting to rescind rights or nullify sections of the license". Polygon reported that "in the weeks that Hasbro spent publicly flailing, customers spent an extraordinary amount of money investing in its competition". Paizo stated that it had "sold through 'an 8-month supply' of the Pathfinder Core Rulebook" within two weeks; the company also reported high demand for other products such as the Pathfinder Beginner Box.

In April 2023, Paizo announced that it will remaster its core Pathfinder second edition rulebooks, to complete its move away from the Wizards of the Coast OGL and to the new ORC license. For the remaster, Paizo changed, reworked or renamed many of the game's rules, mechanics, and its lore and setting details, "to remove the chance of future licensing conflicts with Wizards". At Gen Con 2023, Paizo also announced that it will be releasing a second edition of Starfinder under the ORC license. The Pathfinder second edition remastered rules were released on November 15, 2023.

In 2025, Diamond Comic Distributors, Paizo's exclusive distributor for its physical products, filed for bankruptcy, leading to around $10 million of Paizo's stock held up during bankruptcy proceedings. While Paizo has been able to legally nullify their Diamond contract and obtained a new distributor, Independent Publishers Group, this is still being challenged by Diamond in courts. As a result, Paizo announced in June 2026 that they had to write off the undistributed products as a loss, and with physical sales still low, they had to lay off 12 employees. Paizo also planned to reduce their product output to two modules a month (one for Pathfinder and another for Starfinder). They were also bolstering community-created content to help offset their slowdown in releases. Paizo also terminated its contract with "Archives of Nethys", a third-party website that hosted Pathfinder and Starfinder rulebooks and other material under a free access model. According to the site's owners, the contract was terminated because the site never made enough money to pay royalties back to Paizo. While the site will still be able to host rules, they will be limited by when these are published by Paizo rather than with early access materials, and will remove copyrighted art from the site. Paizo subsequently released an official statement, stating that: "The use of Paizo artwork on the web also created ongoing confusion about what assets are allowed under the Community Use Policy ... other sites routinely copied those assets and used them for themselves. That created additional work for our legal and licensing teams to draft DMCA and cease‑and‑desist notices."

Paizo announced a partnership in August 2026 with the online tabletop games store DriveThruRPG, that will offer all of Paizo's digital catalog as well as physical sales of its books.

== Reception ==
Paizo Publishing won the 2005 Silver ENnie Award for "Best Publisher", and the 2012 Gold ENnie Award for "Fan’s Favorite Publisher", and again in 2013, and the Silver in 2015, and Gold again in 2016.
