= Gumshoe System =

Tabletop role-playing game

The GUMSHOE System
- The GUMSHOE system Logo
- Designers: Robin Laws
- Publishers: Pelgrane Press
- Publication: 2007; 19 years ago
- Genres: Investigation
- Systems: Gumshoe System

The Gumshoe System (stylised as The GUMSHOE System) is a role-playing game system created in 2007 by Robin Laws, designed for running investigative scenarios. The premise is that investigative games are not about finding clues, they are about interpreting the clues that are found. The Gumshoe System is used in various games published by Pelgrane Press. As a result of the Hillfolk kickstarter, the SRD for the Gumshoe System has been made available for use under two open licenses: the Open Game License (OGL) and Creative Commons Attribution.

Of the games in the line, Trail of Cthulhu won the 2010 Lucca Games award for best role-playing game and Ashen Stars was a 2011 nominee for the Origins Award for best RPG.

== Concept ==
The Gumshoe System is designed around the idea that investigative scenarios are difficult to run with most role-playing systems. The problem is identified as important clues being missed due to failed dice-rolls, resulting in play grinding to a halt.

The Gumshoe System is designed to solve this by making the game not about finding clues, but about interpreting them. Attention is given to designing investigative scenarios, while at the same time the focus is put on encouraging the players to take control of the investigation (and, thereby, the story being told).

The Gumshoe System is player-centric, putting die rolling in the hands of the players whenever possible. Non-player character abilities either modify the roll made by the player, or succeeds or fails depending on what the game master finds dramatically appropriate. Direct conflict between characters, such as combat, is an exception.

== Character creation ==
Player characters in the Gumshoe System are created by using build points to buy rating points in character abilities. Points are spent on a one-for-one basis.

Each player character receives a number of investigative build points depending on the number of players and the setting. In The Esoterrorists setting, two players receive 32 investigative build points each, while five or more players receive 20 build points each. Any number of investigative build points can be spent on an investigative ability, though more than 3 or 4 points is rarely useful.

Each player character receives a number of general build points depending on the setting, but regardless of number of players. In The Esoterrorists setting players receive 60 general build points each. Any number of general build points can be spent on a general ability, as long as the second highest rated ability is at least half that of the highest rated. After a scenario is completed, player characters receive new build points which can be used as either investigative or general build points. The amount acquired depends on the length of the scenario. There are no levels through which player characters progress.

== Game mechanics ==
All mechanics in the Gumshoe System revolve around character abilities. Attributes, common to most role-playing games, are not used in Gumshoe. Rating points go into a pool of points that can be used in spends related to that ability. Spent or lost points from ability pools are refreshed at various points of play.

=== Investigative abilities ===
The purpose of investigative abilities is to find clues that advance the story. These clues are called core clues. Investigative abilities always work; there are no dice rolls involved. If a scene contains a core clue and a player character uses an investigative ability that relates to the clue, the character will find the clue.

A spend for an investigative ability costs 1 or 2 points. A spend gives additional clues. These clues are not necessary to solve the scenario, though they should give additional information or other benefits. Spent pool points from investigative abilities are refreshed between scenarios.

Example of investigative abilities: Architecture, Cop Talk, Forensic Accounting.

=== General abilities ===
General abilities are used when an unknown outcome is dramatically appropriate. For these situations, the Gumshoe System utilizes a single six-sided die, which is rolled against a difficulty (or target number). This is called a test. The standard difficulty is 4, though it can be modified to anything from 2 to 8 to represent special circumstances.

As long as the die roll is equal to or higher than the difficulty, the player character has succeeded in its action.

A spend for a general ability can be as high as that ability's pool. Each point spent adds 1 to the die roll. Spent pool points from general abilities are refreshed between scenarios, though special circumstances can refresh some points during play.

Example of general abilities: Athletics, Health, Shooting.

==== Health and stability ====
Though Health and Stability are general abilities, they function differently. While other abilities are exhausted once they reach 0, Health and Stability can reach negative numbers. This represents serious injury or mental illness. If either ability reaches −12, the player character has died or gone permanently insane.

Use of appropriate abilities can refresh some spent or lost points in Health and Stability during play. Apart from that, Stability refreshes between scenarios, while the player character is required to rest to refresh Health.

== Products ==
Pelgrane Press has produced a number of games that use the Gumshoe System.

- Ashen Stars (2011) – A gritty space opera where the characters are freelance troubleshooters working in the remote region known as the Bleed. By Robin D. Laws.
- Book of Unremitting Horror (2007) – Details creatures and artifacts of the Outer Black. Also contains scenario outlines for The Esoterrorists and two scenarios for Fear Itself. Previously released as d20 book, it was expanded for the Gumshoe System. By Dave Allsop and Adrian Bott.
- Bubblegumshoe (2016) – Teenage detectives solving mysteries in a modern American small town. By Emily Care Boss, Kenneth Hite, and Lisa J. Steele. Winner of the 2017 Gold ENnie for Best Family Game. Published by Evil Hat Productions.
- Cthulhu Confidential (2015) – Horror noir for a GM and one player, by Robin D. Laws, Chris Spivey, and Ruth Tillman.
- Fall of DELTA GREEN (2018) – A prequel game to Delta Green that follows the eponymous organization fighting the Cthulhu Mythos during the 1960s. By Ken Hite.
- The Esoterrorists (2006) – As elite investigators of the Ordo Veritatis, the characters combat occult terrorists who are intent on tearing the fabric of the world by exposing it to the creatures of the Outer Black. By Robin D. Laws.
- Fear Itself (2007) – Set in a similar world to that of The Esoterrorists, Fear Itself focuses on ordinary people who are drawn into confrontation with the creatures of the Outer Black. By Robin D. Laws.
- The Gaean Reach (2014) – A science fiction game set in the Gaean Reach universe of Jack Vance. By Robin D. Laws.
- Lorefinder (2011) – Fantasy adventures. By Gareth Hanrahan.
- Mutant City Blues (2009) – In a world where 1% of the population has gained mutant powers, police procedure has changed forever. The characters are members of the Heightened Crime Investigation Unit that specializes in crimes involving the mutant community. By Robin Laws.
- Night's Black Agents (2012) – Vampire spy thriller game where the characters are secret agents who discover and confront vampiric conspiracies. By Ken Hite.
- Swords of the Serpentine (2022) – Urban sword-and-sorcery in a fantasy Venice. By Kevin Kulp and Emily Dresner.
- Timewatch (2017) – Time Police work to undo changes in the history of the universe.
- Trail of Cthulhu (2008) – Offers a new take on cults, creatures and gods of H. P. Lovecraft's literature, and addresses their uses in investigative role-playing. By Ken Hite.
- The Yellow King Roleplaying Game (2020) – Reality-bending horror inspired by the namesake story collection by Robert W. Chambers. By Robin D. Laws.
