= Pelgrane Press =

British roleplaying games publisher

- Company Logo
- Founded: 1999
- Founder: Simon J Rogers; ProFantasy Software; Sasha Bilton
- Country of origin: United Kingdom
- Headquarters location: London
- Key people: Simon J Rogers; Cat Tobin; Robin D. Laws
- Publication types: Games, Books
- Imprints: Stone Skin Press
- Official website: pelgranepress.com

Pelgrane Press Ltd is a British role-playing game publishing company based in London and founded in 1999. It is co-owned by Simon J Rogers and Cat Tobin. It currently produces GUMSHOE System RPGs, 13th Age, the Diana Jones award-winning Hillfolk RPG, The Dying Earth Roleplaying Game, and other related products. It publishes fiction under the Stone Skin Press imprint.

== History ==
Pelgrane Press was founded in 1999, and was initially owned by Simon Rogers, ProFantasy Software, and Sasha Bilton. It is co-owned by Simon J Rogers and Cat Tobin.

In March 2025, Robin D. Laws was appointed Creative Director

== GUMSHOE System ==
The GUMSHOE System was designed by Robin D. Laws for running investigative, clue-finding games:

- The Esoterrorists and Fear Itself by Robin D. Laws, based on the Book of Unremitting Horror by Adrian Bott and Dave Allsop
- Trail of Cthulhu by Kenneth Hite
- Mutant City Blues, a near-future gritty police procedural Superhero setting by Robin Laws
- Ashen Stars, a darkly rebooted investigative Space opera setting by Robin Laws
- Night's Black Agents, a game of action and espionage in a vampiric setting by Ken Hite
- TimeWatch, an investigative time travel game by Kevin Kulp
- Fall of Delta Green, a conspiracy horror game by Ken Hite set in the 1960s period of the Delta Green RPG setting
- The Yellow King, a surrealist horror game bridging four different eras by Robin D. Laws, inspired by The King in Yellow by Robert W. Chambers
- Swords of the Serpentine, a sword & sorcery RPG by Kevin Kulp and Emily Dresner.

GUMSHOE One-2-One is a re-imagining of the GUMSHOE system for one player, one GM gaming.

- Cthulhu Confidential

The Gaean Reach RPG and the Yellow King RPG each combine elements with other system elements, including Skulduggery systems in the Gaean Reach and GUMSHOE One-2-One elements in The Yellow King. Similarly, Lorefinder grafts GUMSHOE investigative elements onto Paizo's Pathfinder RPG.

== Other Products ==
- 13th Age RPG
- Hillfolk
- The Dying Earth Roleplaying Game
- Skulduggery
- Honey & Hot Wax

== Awards ==
Pelgrane Press has won several Gen Con EN World RPG Awards (the “ENnies”), including the Silver Ennie for Fan's Choice for Best Publisher (2016). The company's Gold Ennies include:

- 2012: Best Electronic Book for Cthulhu Apocalypse: The Apocalypse Machine (for Trail of Cthulhu); Best Writing for The Investigator’s Guide to Occult London
- 2014: Best Adventure for Eternal Lies (for Trail of Cthulhu)
- 2016: Best RPG Related Product for Ken Writes About Stuff, Volume 3; Best Supplement for The Dracula Dossier: Hawkins Papers; Best Writing and Product of the Year for The Dracula Dossier: Director's Handbook (for Night's Black Agents RPG
- 2019: Best Setting for The Fall of Delta Green RPG
- 2020: Best RPG Related Product for Absinthe in Carcosa (for the Yellow King RPG)
- 2023: Best Art, Cover for Swords of the Serpentine RPG

Pelgrane Press won the 2017 Indie Game Developer Network award for "Best Game" for the story game anthology Seven Wonders.

Press coverage has noted Pelgrane's outsized ability to accomplish significant output despite its stature, with one website saying:

Pelgrane are a relatively small company in comparison to some of the other contenders and seeing them sweep the awards shelf is great. They are proof that at least in the table top world, quality products can still conquer the world.
