= 2018 ENnie Award winners =

- Awarded for: Best role-playing games of previous year
- Country: United Kingdom & United States
- Presented by: Gen Con
- First award: 2001
- Website: Archive of 2018 ENNIE Awards

The following are the winners of the 18th annual ENnie Awards, held in 2018:

== Judges' Spotlight Winners ==
- Reece Carter: Fever Swamp, Melsonian Arts Council
- Sean McCoy: Operation Unfathomable, Hydra Cooperative
- Brian Nowak: FAITH – The Sci-Fi RPG 2.0, Burning Games
- Denise Robinson: Winterhorn, Bully Pulpit Games
- Kurt Wiegel: Pip System Corebook, Third Eye Games Author: Carol Darnell, Eloy Lasanta, Crystal Mazur, Derek Kamal, John D. Kennedy, Martin Manco, Amanda Milner, Jacob Wood

== List of gold and silver winners ==
Category	Gold Winner	Silver Winner
Best Adventure	The Dark of Hot Springs Island, Swordfish Islands Authors: Jacob Hurst, Evan Peterson, Donnie Garcia	Delta Green: A Night at the Opera, Arc Dream Publishing Authors: Dennis Detwiller, Shane Ivey, Greg Stolze
Best Aid/Accessory	Hex Kit, Cone of Negative Energy	Conan GM Screen, Modiphius Entertainment
Best Art, Cover	Harlem Unbound, Darker Hue Studios Artist: Brennen Reece	Critical Role: Tal'Dorei Campaign Setting, Green Ronin Publishing Artist: Aaron Riley
Best Art, Interior	City of Mist, Son of Oak Game Studio Artist: Marcin Soboń, Mariusz Sculz, Ario Murti, Carlos Gomes Cabral, Monsters Pit	Frostbitten and Mutilated, Lamentations of the Flame Princess Artist: Zak Smith
Best Blog	Gnome Stew -The Gaming Blog	Sly Flourish
Best Cartography	The Midderlands – An OSR Setting & Bestiary, MonkeyBlood Design & Publishing Cartographer: Glynn Seal	Starfinder Pact Worlds, Paizo Inc. Cartographer: Damien Mammoliti
Best Electronic Book	Delta Green: A Night at the Opera, Arc Dream Publishing	Scenario from Ontario, Dungeons and Donuts
Best Family Product	Khan of Khans, Chaosium Inc.	Heavy Metal Thunder Mouse, Shoreless Skies Publishing
Best Free Game	High Plains Samurai: Legends, Broken Ruler Games	Saga of the Goblin Horde, Zadmar Games
Best Free Product	RuneQuest: Quickstart Rules and Adventure, Chaosium Inc.	Tabletop Audio – Original Ambiences and Interactive Sounds, Tabletop Audio
Best Game	Zweihänder Grim & Perilous RPG, Grim & Perilous Studios Author: Daniel D. Fox	Delta Green: The RPG, Arc Dream Publishing Authors: Dennis Detwiller, Adam Scott Glancy, Christopher Gunning, Kenneth Hite, Shane Ivey, Greg Stolze
Best Miniature Product	Star Trek Adventures Miniatures: The Next Generation, Modiphius Entertainment	Double-Sided Dry-Erase Tiles, Gaming Paper
Best Monster/Adversary	Frostbitten and Mutilated, Lamentations of the Flame Princess Author: Zak Smith	Down Darker Trails, Chaosium Inc. Authors: Kevin Ross, Mike Mason, Scott David Aniolowski, David Cole, Todd Woods
Best Organized Play	Lost Tales of Myth Drannor, D&D Adventurers League, Greg Marks, Robert Adducci, Bill Benham, Travis Woodall, Claire Hoffman, Alan Patrick	End of the Line, Michael Maenza
Best Podcast	Miskatonic University Podcast, Miskatonic University Podcast	Fear of a Black Dragon, Fear of a Black Dragon
Best Production Values	Delta Green: The RPG, Arc Dream Publishing	Star Trek Adventures: Collectors Edition Core Rulebook, Modiphius Entertainment
Best RPG Related Product	Khan of Khans, Chaosium Inc.	Dresden Files Cooperative Card Game, Evil Hat Productions
Best Rules	Delta Green: The RPG, Arc Dream Publishing Authors: Dennis Detwiller, Adam Scott Glancy, Christopher Gunning, Kenneth Hite, Shane Ivey, Greg Stolze	Star Trek Adventures: Core Rulebook, Modiphius Entertainment Authors: Dave Chapman, Jim Johnson, Patrick Goodman, Ross Isaacs, Bill Maxwell, Jonathan Breese, Nathan Dowdell, John Snead, Oz Mills, Aaron Pollyea, Rob Wieland, Ade Smith, Anthony Jennings, Dan Taylor, Dayton Ward, Michael Brophy, Giles Pritchard, Maggie Carroll, Steven Creech, Shawn Merwin, Sam Webb, Jacob Ross
Best Setting	Harlem Unbound, Darker Hue Studios Authors: Chris Spivey, Ruth Tillman, Bob Geis, Sarah Hood, Neall Raemonn Price	Frostbitten and Mutilated, Lamentations of the Flame Princess Author: Zak Smith
Best Supplement	Reign of Terror, Chaosium Inc. Authors: Mark Morrison, Penelope Love, James Coquillat, Darren Watson	Shadowrun Dark Terrors, Catalyst Game Labs Authors: Brooke Chang, Kevin Czarnecki, Jason M. Hardy, Alexander Kadar, Adam Large, O.C. Presley, Scott Schletz, Dylan Stengel, R.J. Thomas, Amy Veeres
Best Website	Blades in the Dark SRD, Amazing Rando Design	Elven Tower Website, Elven Tower Website
Best Writing	Harlem Unbound, Darker Hue Studios Author: Chris Spivey, Ruth Tillman, Bob Geis, Sarah Hood, Neall Raemonn Price	Frostbitten and Mutilated, Lamentations of the Flame Princess Author: Zak Smith
Product of the Year	Zweihänder Grim & Perilous RPG, Grim & Perilous Studios	Delta Green: The RPG, Arc Dream Publishing
