= 1999 Origins Award winners =

Gaming award winners

The following are the winners of the 26th annual (1999) Origins Award, presented at Origins 2000:

Category	Winner	Company	Designer(s)
Best Abstract Board Game of 1999	Button Men	Cheapass Games	Designer: James Ernest
Best Action Computer Game of 1999	MechWarrior 3	Microprose, Inc.	Designers: Graham Kays, Michael Mancuso, Erol Oms, Rob Sears, George Sinfield, Brian Soderberg
Best Amateur Game Magazine of 1999	Alarums & Excursions	Lee Gold	Publisher: Lee Gold
Best Card Game Expansion or Supplement of 1999	7th Sea: Strange Vistas	Alderac Entertainment Group	Designers: Dan Verssen, Rob Vaux, Kevin Wilson
Best Game-Related Novel of 1999	Delta Green: The Rules of Engagement	Pagan Publishing	Author: John Tynes
Best Game-Related Short Work of 1999	Just a Tad Beyond Innsmouth	Chaosium, Inc.	Author: Stanley C. Sargent
Best Graphic Presentation of a Board Game of 1999	Button Men	Cheapass Games	Designer: James Ernest
Best Graphic Presentation of a Card Game or Supplement of 1999	7th Sea: No Quarter!	Alderac Entertainment Group	Designers: Dan Verssen, David Williams, John Zinser
Best Graphic Presentation of a Roleplaying Game, Adventure, or Supplement of 1999	Dark*Matter	Wizards of the Coast	Designers: Wolfgang Bauer, Monte Cook
Best Historical Board Game of 1999	Great War at Sea: 1904–1905, The Russo-Japanese Naval War	Avalanche Press	
Best Historical Figure Miniature Series of 1999	German Assault Squad	Easy Eight Enterprises	
Best Historical Miniatures Rules of 1999	Armies of Antiquity	Warhammer Historical Wargames	
Best Ongoing Play-by-Mail Game of 1999	Middle-earth PBM Fourth Age, circa 1000	Game Systems, Inc.	Designers: William B. Feild, Jr., Peter G. Stassun
Best Professional Game Magazine of 1999	Knights of the Dinner Table Magazine	Kenzer & Company	Developers: Jolly Blackburn, Brian Jelke, Steve Johansson, David Kenzer
Best Roleplaying Adventure of 1999	Beyond the Mountains of Madness	Chaosium, Inc.	Designers: Charles Engan and Janyce Engan
Best Roleplaying Computer Game of 1999	Baldur's Gate: Tales of the Sword Coast	Interplay Productions	
Best Roleplaying Game of 1999	7th Sea Role-Playing Game	Alderac Entertainment Group	Designers: John Wick, Jennifer Wick, Kevin Wilson
Best Roleplaying Supplement of 1999	Delta Green: Countdown	Pagan Publishing	Designers: Dennis Detwiller, Adam Scott Glancy, John Tynes
Best Science Fiction or Fantasy Board Game of 1999	Orcs at the Gates	Jolly Roger Games	Designer: Jim Dietz
Best Science Fiction or Fantasy Figure Miniature of 1999	Togashi Yokuni	Alderac Entertainment Group	Designer: Chaz Elliot
Best Science Fiction or Fantasy Miniatures Rules of 1999	Diskwars	Fantasy Flight Games	Designers: Tom Jolly, Christian T. Petersen
Best Strategy Computer Game of 1999	Sid Meier's Alpha Centauri	Firaxis	Designers: Sid Meier, Brian Reynolds
Best Trading Card Game of 1999	7th Sea: No Quarter!	Alderac Entertainment Group	Designers: Dan Verssen, David Williams, John Zinser
Best Traditional Card Game of 1999	Chez Geek	Steve Jackson Games	Designer: Jon Darbro
Best Vehicle Miniature of 1999	Babylon 5 Station	Agents of Gaming	Sculptor: John Winters
Adventure Gaming Hall of Fame	Champions	Hero Games	
Adventure Gaming Hall of Fame	GURPS	Steve Jackson Games	
Adventure Gaming Hall of Fame	Greg Costikyan		
Adventure Gaming Hall of Fame	Larry Elmore		
