= Ropecon =

Annual role-playing convention in Finland

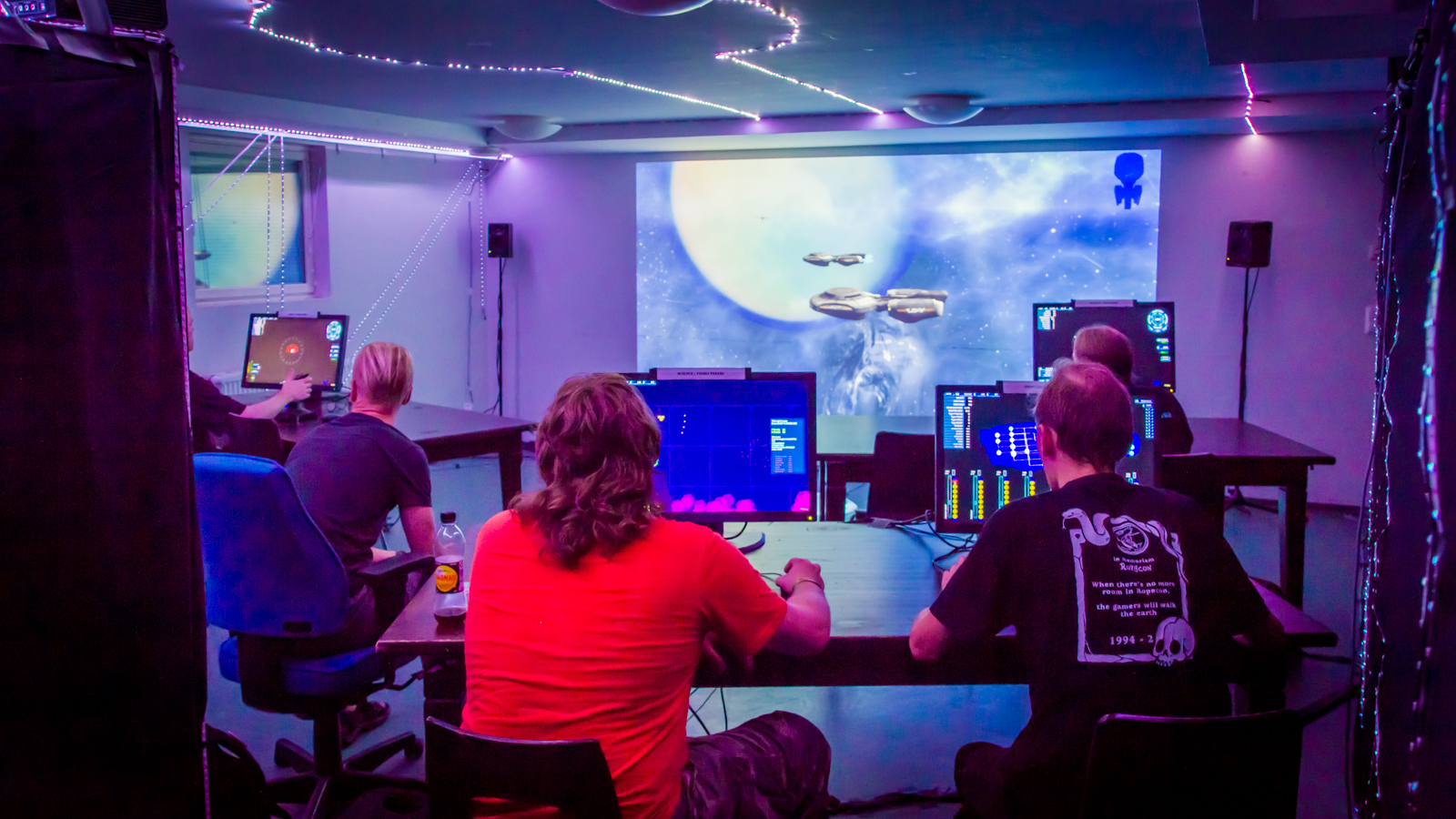
- Gamers playing Artemis at Ropecon 2014
- Status: Active
- Genre: Gaming
- Venue: Messukeskus Helsinki
- Location: Helsinki
- Country: Finland
- Inaugurated: 1994
- Attendance: 3,900
- Organizer: Ropecon Society
- Website: http://www.ropecon.fi/

Ropecon (Finnish pronunciation: [ˈropekon]) is a role-playing convention held annually in Finland. The convention is one of the largest non-commercial annual events of its kind, having reached a record of "over 5900" attendees in 2022. The current venue is the Messukeskus Helsinki convention centre in Helsinki, the capital city of Finland.

Ropecon hosts a wide variety of different types of games, including role-playing games, live action role-playing games, collectible card games, miniature wargames and strategy games. The event also has lectures, panel discussions and other presentations covering different aspects of gaming.

Ropecon is organised by the Ropecon Society, a joint venture of several Finnish role-playing associations. The practical arrangements are made by the unpaid members of an organising committee and hundreds of voluntary workers at the convention. Any profits are used to support various other role-playing activities.

The name "Ropecon" comes from the Finnish language word "roolipeli", meaning role-playing game, but is also a nod to the English language word "rope", a vital piece of equipment in classic dungeon crawl role-playing games.

The Finnish culture ministry supported Ropecon in 2013 with funding.

The 2020 and 2021 conventions were turned into online events because of the worldwide COVID-19 pandemic. Helsingin Sanomat has described Ropecon as Europe's largest volunteer-run role-playing event.

== List of Ropecons ==
| Year | Venue | Guests of honour |
|---|---|---|
| 2023 | Messukeskus Helsinki | Roman Lappat, Shut up & Sit Down Podcast |
| 2022 | Messukeskus Helsinki | Avery Alder, Vlaada Chvátil |
| 2021 | Online | |
| 2020 | Online | |
| 2019 | Messukeskus Helsinki | Lynne Hardy, Jon Hodgson |
| 2018 | Messukeskus Helsinki | Alex Roberts |
| 2017 | Messukeskus Helsinki | Monica Valentinelli, Anna Westerling |
| 2016 | Messukeskus Helsinki | Claus Raasted, Ross Watson |
| 2015 | Dipoli, Espoo | Michelle Nephew, Jason Morningstar |
| 2014 | Dipoli, Espoo | Luke Crane, Jason Soles |
| 2013 | Dipoli | Kevin Wilson, D. Vincent Baker |
| 2012 | Dipoli | Peter Adkison, Larson Kasper |
| 2011 | Dipoli | Frank Mentzer, Erik Mona |
| 2010 | Dipoli | Keith Baker, Friedemann Friese |
| 2009 | Dipoli | L. Scott Johnson, Suzi Yee, Malik Hyltoft and Antti Malin |
| 2008 | Dipoli | Greg Stolze, Chris Pramas and Peter S. Andreasen |
| 2007 | Dipoli | Robin D. Laws, Emily Care Boss and Jakob Rune Nielsen |
| 2006 | Dipoli | Kenneth Hite, Bruno Faidutti, Olle Jonsson and Tobias Wrigstad |
| 2005 | Dipoli | Greg Stafford, Bill Bridges and Claus Raasted |
| 2004 | Dipoli | John Kovalic, Erick Wujcik and Emma Wieslander |
| 2003 | Dipoli | Jonathan Tweet, Ramon Laan and Martin Ericsson |
| 2002 | Dipoli | Justin Achilli and Eirik Fatland |
| 2001 | Dipoli | N. Robin Crossby and Tuomas Pirinen |
| 2000 | Dipoli | Steve Jackson and Richard Dansky |
| 1999 | Dipoli | Mike Pondsmith and Rick Priestley |
| 1998 | Dipoli | Ray Greer and Mark Rosewater |
| 1997 | Paasitorni, Helsinki | Greg Costikyan |
| 1996 | Paasitorni | Tom Dowd and Andy Chambers |
| 1995 | Messukeskus Helsinki | Sandy Petersen |
| 1994 | Paasitorni | Steve Jackson |
