= Shane Ivey =

American role-playing game designer

- Occupation: Game designer

Shane Ivey is an American game designer who has worked primarily on role-playing games.

== Career ==
Shane Ivey worked for Pagan Publishing. After the release of Godlike in 2002 Dennis Detwiller and Ivey founded Arc Dream Publishing. Ivey and Detwiller formed Arc Dream Publishing in late 2002 when Pagan Publishing was ending its main operations; their plan at the time was to publish supplements for Godlike. Detwiller and Ivey wrote the supplement Delta Green: Targets of Opportunity (2010) and brought back the magazine The Unspeakable Oath starting with issue #18 (December 2010).

Through Arc Dream Publishing, Ivey edited and published other games including Monsters and Other Childish Things, Wild Talents, Puppetland, and Better Angels. Ivey contributed to the books Rivendell, Horse-lords of Rohan, and Oaths of the Riddermark for Cubicle 7 Entertainment's J.R.R. Tolkien-based roleplaying game The One Ring Roleplaying Game. Ivey cowrote Delta Green: The Role-Playing Game with Dennis Detwiller, Adam Scott Glancy, and Greg Stolze, and cowrote or published 34 books in the award-winning Delta Green line between 2015 and 2020.
