= Weapons of the Gods =

Weapons of the Gods may refer to:

- Weapons of the Gods (comics), a comic series published by ComicsOne, translated from Chinese from the original series by Wong Yuk Long
- Weapons of the Gods (role-playing game), a wuxia role-playing game set based on the comics, published by Eos Press
