= Greg Stolze =

American writer and game designer

Greg Stolze (born 1970) is an American game designer, writer and novelist, whose work has mainly focused on writing for role-playing games and related intellectual properties.

== Career ==
Stolze began his career writing role playing games professionally when he was chosen by Jonathan Tweet to write for the Everway storytelling game; the Spherewalker Sourcebook was Stolze's first full-length RPG book. Subsequently, he was commissioned to write the original Usagi Yojimbo Roleplaying Game.

Stolze had met John Scott Tynes when they collaborated with Robin Laws to write Wildest Dreams (1993), a supplement for Tweet's Over the Edge. Stolze and Tynes later co-designed the roleplaying game Unknown Armies; Stolze helped write the mechanics for the game, based on a setting Tynes had been developing for a few years. Although Atlas Games expressed interest in Unknown Armies, Tynes chose to go with Archon Games. Then, Tynes and Stolze learned that founder Lisa Manns was going to close Archon Games; when she returned the rights to them, they looked for a new publisher, and Atlas Games ultimately published the game in January 1999. Stolze then became the line editor for Feng Shui, the role-playing game by Laws based on the Hong Kong action genre.

Meanwhile, Stolze and Dennis Detwiller worked to get their game Godlike ready for publication by Pagan Publishing; however Pagan was going to close, so Detwiller took the game to his friends Hsin Chen and Aron Anderson, who created the company Hawthorn Hobgoblynn Press (later known as Eos Press) in 2001 to publish the game. Godlike uses the One-Roll Engine (ORE) dice system created by Stolze; in 2003 he withdrew the license from EOS to use ORE. Detwiller formed Arc Dream Publishing in 2002 to produce supplements for Godlike, and in 2003 Arc Dream licensed the ORE from Stolze, which it subsequently used in other genres, such as in Benjamin Baugh's RPG Monsters and Other Childish Things. Meanwhile, Stolze contributed to role-playing game books for White Wolf Game Studio including Demon: the Fallen and Vampire: The Requiem and wrote novels set in the world of these games. Stolze also created the traditional strategy board game Elemental for Kenzer & Company.

For Arc Dream, Stolze co-authored Wild Talents (2006), the "sequel" to Godlike, with Detwiller, Kenneth Hite and Shane Ivey, and also wrote alternate settings for the game such as eCollapse. Arc Dream also published a print edition of Reign Enchiridion, a simplified version of his Reign fantasy RPG, which featured an innovative group resolution mechanic built on the ORE rules. He later incorporated similar rules in the Progenitor setting for Wild Talents.

Some of Stolze's later work has been self-published using the "ransom method", whereby the game is only released when enough potential buyers have contributed enough money to reach a threshold set by the author. For example, Stolze released the wargame Meatbot Massacre after its ransom goal was met. Stolze has also co-written the free game NEMESIS, which juxtaposes the One-Roll Engine with the Madness Meter derived from Unknown Armies. Stolze has also produced small, independent role-playing games such as Executive Decision and ... in Spaaace!, and subsequently published Dinosaurs ... in SPAAACE (using the same Token Effort system), after a successful Kickstarter campaign. Subsequently, Arc Dream released the ORE RPG Better Angels, where each player plays one character, while also taking the role of the demon who grants another player character superpowers.

Stolze has participated in two projects resulting from highly successful Kickstarters: the Delta Green role-playing game from Arc Dream publishing, and the Third Edition of Unknown Armies, for Atlas Games. In addition, his own successful kickstarter resulted in the publication of the experimental novel "You", written in the second person and set, like his previous novels Godwalker and Switchflipped, in the universe of the Unknown Armies RPG.

== Author credits ==
=== Novels ===
- Ashes and Angel Wings (2003)
- The Seven Deadlies (2003)
- The Wreckage of Paradise (2003)
- A Hunger Like Fire (2004)
- The Marriage of Virtue and Viciousness (2005)
- Godwalker (2005)
- Switchflipped (2011)
- Mask of the Other (2011)
- Sinner (2013)
- The Forgotten Monk (2015)
- You (2017)

=== Role-playing games ===
- Usagi Yojimbo Roleplaying Game (1998) ISBN 0-9704583-8-X
- Unknown Armies (1998) ISBN 1-58978-013-2 with John Scott Tynes
- (3004) City of Lies box set (L-1 City of Lies) (1999)
- Godlike (2002) ISBN 0-9710642-0-2 with Dennis Detwiller
- Wild Talents (2006) with Dennis Detwiller, Kenneth Hite and Shane Ivey, along with supplements including:
  - eCollapse
  - Grim War, with Kenneth Hite
  - Progenitor
- Nemesis (2006) with Dennis Detwiller and Shane Ivey
- Reign (2007)
- A Dirty World (2008)
- Dinosaurs ... in SPAAACE! (2011)
- Better Angels (2013)
- Delta Green (2016) with Dennis Detwiller, Adam Scott Glancy, Kenneth Hite and Shane Ivey
