= Kenneth Hite =

American game designer (born 1965)

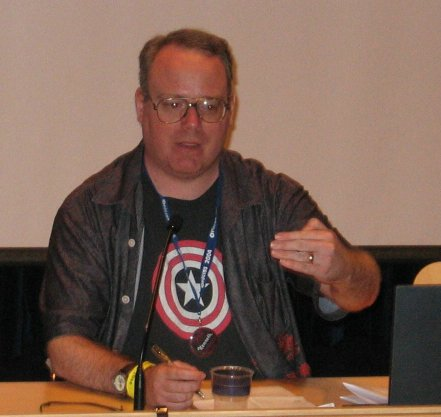
- Kenneth Hite in Ropecon, Espoo, Finland on August 12, 2006
- Occupation: Game designer

Kenneth Hite (born September 15, 1965) is a writer and role-playing game designer. Hite is the author of Trail of Cthulhu and Night's Black Agents role-playing games, and lead designer of the 5th edition of Vampire: the Masquerade.

== Education ==
Hite holds an M.A. in International Relations from the University of Chicago and a bachelor's degree in Cartography from East Central University.

== Career ==
Kenneth Hite has been designing games part-time since 1981 and full-time since 1995. Some of his early design work was featured in the Nephilim role-playing game for Chaosium before the game line was ended in 1997. After establishing a freelance career, Hite came to Last Unicorn Games and joined the developers working on the "Icon system" for their line of licensed Star Trek role-playing games; to quickly get Star Trek: The Next Generation Role-playing Game ready for GenCon 31, Hite was one of the freelancers flown to Los Angeles for two weeks. After Icon was completed, Hite was made the line developer for the Star Trek: The Original Series role-playing game, and by 1999 he was a full-time employee of Last Unicorn Games. In February 2001 Decipher, Inc. offered to hire the remaining staff of Last Unicorn after the company was purchased by Wizards of the Coast. Hite joined Decipher but eventually left and became part of the staff of Steve Jackson Games, where he wrote GURPS WWII: Weird War II for the Generic Universal RolePlaying System. He later worked on the fourth edition of RuneQuest. He also did work on some Unknown Armies sourcebooks, and on its second edition.

He wrote the "Suppressed Transmission" column for Pyramid magazine. The column has been collected into the volumes Suppressed Transmission: The First Broadcast and Suppressed Transmission 2: The Second Broadcast. He also wrote the "Out of the Box" column, initially for the GamingReport, and later for IndiePressRevolution. He also contributed a guest comic strip for Dork Tower in 2004.

Hite is also one of many contributors to the book Gamemastering Secrets, which won the 2002 Origins Award for Best Game Aid or Accessory. In 2008, Atomic Overmind Press published some Cthulhu books Hite worked on, and he wrote Where the Deep Ones Are (2008), The Antarctic Express (2009), "Cliffourd the Big Red God" (2011), and "Goodnight Azathoth" (2015) in the Mini Mythos series for Atlas Games as parodies of children's books with entities from the Cthulhu mythos. His essay, “Cthulhu’s Polymorphous Perversity”, appears in Cthulhurotica, published by Dagan Books in December 2010. Hite produced a series of Lovecraftian gaming PDFs released by Ronin Arts.

In February 2008, Pelgrane Press published Hite's Trail of Cthulhu, a role-playing game using the GUMSHOE System developed by Robin Laws. Hite won two silver ENnies in 2008 for his work on Trail of Cthulhu: Best Writing and Best Rules (shared with Robin Laws). Hite has since added to the Trail of Cthulhu line with Shadows Over Filmland, Rough Magicks, Bookhounds of London, and Mythos Expeditions.

Hite's second GUMSHOE System game, Night's Black Agents, was released in 2012; players take the role of burned spies in the underworld of contemporary Europe who are suddenly confronted by the existence of vampires. Later that year, he joined the staff of Pelgrane Press full-time, and began a series of monthly books of gaming material under the title Ken Writes About Stuff, which concluded in 2016 after three "volumes". The series alternated between examinations of creatures in H. P. Lovecraft's fiction and mythos, the Hideous Creatures series, and books exploring other role-playing gaming topics including optional GUMSHOE rules expansions, historical magic systems, and campaign settings. In 2015, he and Gareth Ryder-Hanrahan released a collaborative, improvisational campaign The Dracula Dossier for Night's Black Agents. This campaign proposes that Bram Stoker's 1897 novel Dracula was in fact the after-action report of a British Intelligence attempt to recruit a vampire. The published work includes the "unredacted" first draft of that novel, as annotated by three generations of MI6 agents. Hite subsequently authored the Fall of Delta Green RPG for Pelgrane as part of the Delta Green Kickstarter.

In addition to his work for Pelgrane, Hite has collaborated with Dennis Detwiller, Greg Stolze and Shane Ivey on the second edition of the Wild Talents RPG and the supplement Grim War. He wrote Day after Ragnarok, a genre-bending post-apocalyptic setting published by Atomic Overmind Press, and collaborated in Bubblegumshoe with Emily Care Boss and Lisa J. Steele, for Evil Hat Productions. In addition, he developed and designed the latest edition of the Vampire RPG.

Hite and fellow author and game designer Robin Laws have released a podcast titled Ken and Robin Talk About Stuff each week since August 2012. Development of Vampire: The Masquerade's 5th edition was led by Hite; the edition was released in early 2018.

== Personal life ==
Hite lives in Chicago with his wife Sheila. He considers himself a person of faith and analyzed horror from a Christian perspective, but has not publicly expressed details. In 2023, he was shot in the leg during a robbery.

== Works ==
In his current employment with Pelgrane Press, Hite has contributed extensively to the GUMSHOE System, as author of Trail of Cthulhu, and the supplements Shadows Over Filmland, Rough Magicks, Bookhounds of London, and Mythos Expeditions; also the RPG Night's Black Agents and its major campaign The Dracula Dossier.

Previously, Hite wrote or contributed to several GURPS supplements, including:

- GURPS Alternate Earths,
- GURPS Alternate Earths II,
- GURPS Cabal,
- GURPS Horror (Third Edition incorporating Nightmares of Mine material in 2002, also Fourth Edition in 2011),
- GURPS Infinite Worlds (Winner of the 2005 Origins Award for Role-Playing Game Supplement of the Year),
- GURPS WWII: Weird War II,
- and GURPS Y2K.

In addition, he worked on the Decipher/Last Unicorn Star Trek RPGs

- Star Trek RPG Player's Guide (with Matt Colville, Steven S. Long and Don Mappin) (2002),
- Starfleet Operations Manual (2003),
- All Our yesterdays (with Steve Kenson, James Kiley, S. John Ross and Steven S. Long) (2000),
- and Planetary Adventures (1999).

He has also contributed to the Nephilim games

- Secret Societies (1995),
- Major Arcana (1997),
- and Gamemaster's Companion (with Shannon Appel, Adrian Czajkowski, and Ross Isaacs) (1996);

as well as to supplements for other role-playing games like:

- Adventures Into Darkness (for Hero System and Mutants & Masterminds),
- Mage: The Sorcerer's Crusade (for Mage: The Ascension),
- Crusade Lore (for Mage: The Sorcerer's Crusade) (with Phil Brucato and Wayne Peacock) (1998),
- Cainite Heresy (for Vampire: The Dark Ages),
- Nightmares of Mine (for Rolemaster) (with John Curtis) (1999),
- Back East: The South (for Deadlands),
- Dubious Shards (which includes an adventure for Delta Green),
- Secrets of the Ruined Temple (for Mage: The Awakening),
- Day after Ragnarok (for Savage Worlds and Hero System),
- Wild Talents RPG (with Dennis Detwiller, Greg Stolze and Shane Ivey) (2010),
- and Grim War (for Wild Talents RPG) (with Greg Stolze) (2010).

Books by Hite:

- The Complete Idiot's Guide to U.S. History, Graphic Illustrated (with Sheperd Hendrix) (2009)
- The Antarctic Express (with Christina Rodriguez) (2009)
- Cthulhu 101 (with John Kovalic) (2009)
- Where the Deep Ones Are (with Andy Hopp) (2008)
- Cliffourd the Big Red God (with Andy Hopp) (2011)
- Tour de Lovecraft: The Tales (2008)
- The Nazi Occult (with Darren Tan) (2013)
- The Cthulhu Wars: The United States' Battles Against the Mythos (with Kennon Bauman) (2016)
