= Prowler =

Prowler may refer to:

- "Prowler", a song by Iron Maiden from Iron Maiden, 1980

== Comics ==
- Prowler (Marvel Comics), a Marvel Comics superhero
- Prowler (Eclipse Comics), American Comic book series

== Film ==
- The Prowler (1951 film), a film starring Van Heflin
- The Prowler (1981 film), a film starring Laurence Tierney and Farley Granger

== Television ==
- "The Prowler", a 1987 episode of All at No 20
- "The Prowler" (Australian Playhouse), an episode of the Australian anthology TV series Australian Playhouse
- "The Prowler", a 1956 episode of Climax!
- "The Prowler", a 1966 episode of Gideon's Way
- "The Prowler", an episode of Matlock Police
- "The Prowler", a 1964 episode of Mister Ed
- "The Prowler", a 1973 episode of Owen Marshall, Counselor at Law
- "The Prowler", a 1972 episode of Queenie's Castle
- "The Prowler" (Rising Damp), a 1974 episode
- "The Prowler", a 1997 episode of Spider-Man: The Animated Series, "Chapter XI" of Partners in Danger
- "The Prowler", episode five of Stand by Your Man
- "The Prowler", a 1965 episode of The Adventures of Ozzie and Harriet
- "The Prowler", a 1961 episode of The Defenders (1961)
- "The Prowler", a 1960 episode of The Detectives (1959)
- "The Prowler", a 1960 episode of The Flintstones
- "The Prowler", a 1953 episode of The Jackie Gleason Show
- "The Prowler", a 1972 episode of Wait Till Your Father Gets Home

== Other uses ==
- Prowler (roller coaster), a wooden roller coaster at Worlds of Fun
- Prowler (Farscape), a type of spacecraft in Farscape
- Plymouth Prowler, an automobile
- Concept Prowler, an ultralight aircraft
- Northrop Grumman EA-6B Prowler, an electronic warfare aircraft
- PROWLER (Programmable Robot Observer With Logical Enemy Response), a 1980s experimental sentry robot
- Prowler, a member of the Predator monster truck team
- Prowler (satellite), an American reconnaissance satellite
- The Prowlers, Italian band

== Literature ==
- Prowlers, a 1987 novel by Maurice Gee
- Prowlers, a 1991 novel by Eugene Izzi
- Prowlers, a 2001 novel by Christopher Golden, book one of the Prowlers series

== See also ==
- Night Prowler (disambiguation)
- Stalker (disambiguation)
