= Night Prowler =

Night Prowler or variation, may refer to:

- "Night Prowler" (song), a 1979 AC/DC song off the album Highway to Hell
- "Night Prowler" (2001 song), a hip hop song by Living Legends, off their album Almost Famous (Living Legends album)
- Richard Ramirez (1960-2013) a serial killer nicknamed "The Night Prowler"
- The Night Prowler: The Richard Ramirez Story, a true crime book about the serial killer
- Night prowler (Dungeons & Dragons), a type of monster found in Dungeons & Dragons
- Nightprowler, a 1995 heroic fantasy video game designed by Croc (game designer)
- Nightprowler: Second Edition, a 2006 video game published by 2 Dés Sans Faces
- NightProwler SA, an airsoft gun made by Crosman
- Prowlers of the Night, a 1926 U.S. silent western film

== See also ==
- Prowler (disambiguation)
- Night (disambiguation)
- Night Stalker (disambiguation)
- The Night the Prowler (film) 1978 Australian film
