= Secret Societies (Nephilim) =

Role-playing game supplement

Secret Societies is a 1995 role-playing game supplement for Nephilim published by Chaosium.

== Contents ==
Secret Societies is a supplement which details the secret societies which align against the Nephilim as they quest for spiritual transcendence. It is about the hidden world of the occult and the shadow war that humans fight against it.

The book details some of the major secret societies that oppose the Nephilim, as well as some new groups.

== Publication history ==
The book was written by Kenneth Hite.

== Reception ==
Andrew Rilstone reviewed Secret Societies for Arcane magazine, rating it a 5 out of 10 overall. Rilstone comments that "I get the feeling that this book is aimed at people who are interested in the world of Nephilim for its own sake, irrespective of whether they are actually going to play it. if you're one of them, then you'll probably find it indispensable."

Pyramid magazine reviewed Secret Societies and stated that "Most Nephilim have lived out several lifetimes, and have gained experiences unique to many different time periods, providing one of the most unique, and coolest, facets of a Nephilim character. Chronicle of the Awakenings, a previous Nephilim product, detailed many of the eras important to the struggle between mankind and the secret beings who live alongside them. The newest Nephilim book, Secret Societies, deals primarily with the hidden underworld of the occult and the human societies who are committed to fighting this shadow war."

== Reviews ==
- The Unspeakable Oath #14/15 (1997)
