= 2 Dés Sans Faces =

Boardgame publisher

2d Sans Faces
- Company type: Cooperative
- Founded: 2001
- Headquarters: Lausanne, Switzerland
- Website: www.2dsansfaces.com

2d Sans Faces (or 2 Dés Sans Faces or 2dsf) is a game publishing house based in Romandy, Switzerland. Its goals are to create and publish aspects of games, including works of fiction, tabletop role-playing games, and reference documents for the leisure industry.

== History ==
2d Sans Faces was founded in January 2001, to publish the first French licensed translation of Nobilis. Later they would develop and publish under licence Nightprowler (second edition) and Tigres Volants. The legal structure adopted was that of a cooperative society as under Swiss law, this allowed them to choose their cooperative members. Since 2017, 2d Sans Faces has published the adaptation of the Norwegian surreal fantasy Itras By and as a design studio, created the Freaks' Squeele super-heroes role-playing game for Ankama.

== Published games ==
- Nobilis (2001), by Jenna K. Moran, is a contemporary fantasy tabletop role-playing game.
- Nightprowler (2nd ed.) (2006), by Croc is a medieval tabletop role-playing game.
- Tigres Volants (2006), by Stéphane "Alias" Gallay, is a science fiction tabletop role-playing game.
- Itras By (2018), French translation of the surreal fantasy role-playing game by Ole Peder Giæver and Martin Bull Gudmundsen.
- La collection Maxbrown (2025), by Pierre "DrNemrod" Saliba, is a contemporary horrific tabletop role-playing game.
