= Arc Dream Publishing =

Tabletop role-playing game publisher

- Type: Private
- Industry: Role-playing game publisher
- Founded: 2002
- Headquarters: Chelsea, Alabama, United States
- Key people: Shane Ivey, Dennis Detwiller
- Products: Godlike, Wild Talents, Delta Green
- Website: www.arcdream.com

Arc Dream Publishing is a small role-playing game publishing company founded in 2002 by Pagan Publishing veteran Dennis Detwiller and editor Shane Ivey after their first roleplaying game Godlike: Superhero Roleplaying in a World on Fire, 1936-1946 was published by Hobgoblynn Press.

On June 9, 2003, Arc Dream became the sole publisher of Godlike and all other products in the Godlike game line. Beyond Godlike, Arc Dream has also released Wild Talents: Superhero Roleplaying in a World Gone Mad, which is an extension of the Godlike system and world.

As of October 29, 2015, a Kickstarter Campaign by Arc Dream Publishing funded a series of new Delta Green products, converting the setting into a standalone role-playing game. On February 26, 2016, a quick-start rulebook Delta Green: Need to Know was released for free download with the Agent's Handbook following soon after on April 27, 2016. The Handler's Guide was released October 31, 2017 in PDF and on March 8, 2018 a compilation of several other Delta Green adventures released by Arc Dream was released in only one book Delta Green: A Night at the Opera, containing the adventures Reverberations, Viscid, Music from a Darkened Room, Extremophilia, Star Chamber and Observer Effect.

The name ARC DREAM comes from one of Dennis Detwiller's other roleplaying games—Delta Green—where it is a secret government project.

== Founders ==
- Dennis Detwiller - Dennis Detwiller is a former American, now Canadian, computer game designer and a role-playing game developer and artist. He was born July 12, 1972.
- Shane Ivey - Shane Ivey is an American game designer who lives in Birmingham, Alabama.

== Publications ==
=== Delta Green products ===
- Delta Green: The Complex (December 4, 2018); The Complex is a book written by Christopher Gunning. In this book, cosmic terror infects the U.S. government and the companies that profit from it. Delta Green: The Complex offers 19 new dossiers for federal agencies and important contractors to enhance the reader's Delta Green campaign. Each dossier describes the entity's budget, operatives, organizational structure and history, mandate, areas of friction with other agencies, suggested professions for Delta Green agents, and what it's like to work there. The Complex gives deep and playable details for the ATF, Booz Allen Hamilton, the Coast Guard, Consolidated Analysis Center, Constellis Group, Customs and Border Protection, DARPA, the Defense Intelligence Agency, FEMA, Lockheed Martin, NASA, the National Nuclear Security Administration, the National Counterterrorism Center, the National Geospatial Intelligence Agency, the National Reconnaissance Office, the NSA, the Office of Naval Intelligence, the RAND Corporation, and the Secret Service. The Complex is playable with Delta Green: The Role-Playing Game. ISBN 978-1-940410-41-8
- Delta Green: Extremophilia (September, 27th, 2018); Extremophilia is a 38-page long book written by Shane Ivey. Delta Green: Extremophilia brings the agents to Helena, Montana, where people are going insane and dying of a bizarre fungal infection. This isn't an ordinary fungus and the agents must attempt to stop the spread of this otherworldly fungus. It is a scenario book written by Shane Ivey and illustrated by Dennis Detwiller. It is playable with Delta Green: Need to Know or Delta Green: Agent's Handbook. ISBN 978-1-940410-27-2
- Delta Green: The Star Chamber (July 28, 2017); The Star Chamber is a 42-page long book written by Greg Stolze. In the book, Delta Green's Task Force T.I. were in Myanmar, deep in the undeveloped hinterlands. The operation went south, people died, and something unnatural and monstrous escaped—perhaps with the aid of an agent from the task force. Now they're the operation for a new team of agents. The player characters must hear testimony from the survivors of Task Force T.I., decide exactly what happened and who's responsible, and recommend a course of action to Delta Green's leaders. The testimony plays out scene by bloody scene. In each flashback, the players temporarily take the roles of the members of Task Force T.I. The players get tips on how to play them based on their individual personalities and prejudices—and, more importantly, the ways that their teammates remember them behaving. Memories of overwhelming terror are rarely accurate. But memories are all Delta Green has to go on if a further horror is to be prevented. The Star Chamber includes a complete scenario and six "secondary" Agents, ready to play in the flashback scenes. It is playable with Delta Green: Need to Know or Delta Green: Agent's Handbook.ISBN 978-1-940410-26-5
- Delta Green: Music From a Darkened Room (October 27, 2017); Music From a Darkened Room is a 36-page long book written and illustrated by Dennis Detwiller. In the book, the reader is in a house at 1206 Spooner Avenue. In the last 50 years, 18 people have died there, and the reader can feel it. Doors in 1206 Spooner Avenue stay shut, and no one ever hears a child's laughter at night. In the hours that stretch like taffy after two, no one ever hears music from a darkened room. It is playable with Delta Green: Need to Know or Delta Green: Agent's Handbook.ISBN 978-1-940410-29-6
- Delta Green: Observer Effect (July 28, 2017); Observer Effect is a 36-page book written by Shane Ivey. In the book, Delta Green has reason to suspect that something was going on in The Olympian Holobeam Array, funded in part by the U.S. Department of Energy. It immediately pulled strings to launch an emergency inspection, sending the players’ Agents to investigate, under cover of a Department of Energy safety inspection. The Agents have no idea what they'll find when they reach the Array. It is playable with Delta Green: Need to Know or Delta Green: Agent's Handbook. ISBN 978-1-940410-25-8
- Delta Green: Handler's Guide (October, 2017), the Game Master-only book with lore information and enemy statistics. It contains a Handler-facing glossary, index, recommended media, sample NPCs to use in any game, rules variants, etc.ISBN 978-1-940410-28-9
- Delta Green: Agent's Handbook (April 27, 2016 PDF; August 1, 2016 hardcover); a players-only core rule book. Contains rules for creating agents, rules for investigations, rules for combat, sanity rules, rules for home scenes, dossiers on the federal agencies most likely to be featured in play and rules to determine equipment and assets. ISBN 1-940410-21-5
- Delta Green: Kali Ghati (April 27, 2016); a scenario for Delta Green where the Agents are soldiers, intelligence officers, federal agents or civilian contractors among the U.S. forces in Afghanistan. Thanks to Delta Green's machinations, all have been in Afghanistan longer than they ever planned. They expect to be sent home soon. But now, they have a mission. Again. A fellow Delta Green agent has gone missing from an Army base in a troubled province. It's up to the player characters to find him before the disappearance draws the kind of attention that Delta Green cannot afford. Kali Ghati includes a complete scenario and six ready-to-play Agents. It is playable with Delta Green: Need to Know or Delta Green: Agent's Handbook. ISBN 9781940410241
- Delta Green: Lover in the Ice (May 29, 2016), PDF scenario by Caleb Stokes. An apocalyptic ice storm has crippled Lafontaine, Missouri. The Agents must secure a forgotten storage facility packed with artifacts of past Delta Green operations. They soon confront a horror that gruesomely invades and mutilates its victims. Lover in the Ice is playable with Delta Green: Need to Know or Delta Green: Agent's Handbook.
- Delta Green: Need to Know (August 1, 2016), written by Bret Kramer and Shane Ivey. It is a GM screen and quick-start rule book; ISBN 1-940410-20-7

=== Other products ===
The Kerberos Club

- Dennis Detwiller and Greg Stolze's Godlike and Wild Talents, using the One-Roll Engine.
- Greg Stolze's demonic supervillain game Better Angels, using a version of the One-Roll Engine system focused more heavily on internal conflict.
- Nemesis, a freely distributed horror roleplaying game also using the One-Roll Engine system.
- Benjamin Baugh's Monsters and Other Childish Things (2008), a comedy horror role-playing game about small children with horrible pet monsters using a simplified version of the One-Roll Engine system.
- Bruce Baugh's Victorian Kerberos Club (2009) was one of the Wild Talents spinoffs published as supplements rather than full games. Arc Dream Publishing also translated The Kerberos Club to the Savage Worlds (2010) and Fate (2011) game systems, with the latter version being a complete RPG.

=== Future products ===
- Wrestlenomicon: As of March 5, 2019, a Kickstarter Campaign by Arc Dream Publishing was launched to fund their upcoming game Wrestlenomicon. They set a goal of $20,000 with an additional $25,000 and $30,000 goal. If they reach $25,000 they will add an Nyarlathotep expansion deck, and if their $30,000 goal is reached they will add a Yog-Sothoth expansion deck. As of May 5, 2019 they have raised $22,985 with 758 backers. Dennis Detwiller and Shane Ivey conceived Wrestlenomicon, wrote all the card titles, oversaw production, and will publish the game. Kurt Komoda painted the cards. Simeon Cogswell designed the cards. Adam Jury-Last laid out prototype decks in time for Gen Con 2018. Rachel Ivey produced preview videos. Jonathan Ivey narrated them. Jake Cook, David LaRocca, and Heath Robinson played Wrestlenomicon with Shane Ivey in the videos. The Darkest of the Hillside Thickets provided bad-ass music. If one pledges $1 or more they will receive a PDF which contains two decks and the rules. If they pledge $20 or more they will also receive a copy of Wrestlenomicon with Cthulhu and Hastur decks, as well as two bonus cards, and their name will be listed in the acknowledgements under Friends of Old Castro. If they pledge $25 or more they will also receive an extra Hastur or Cthulhu bonus card, and their name will be listed in the acknowledgements under Cultists of Cthulhu. If they pledge $40 or more they will also receive a Wrestlenomicon playmat with 4 exclusive Cthulhu servitor cards, 4 exclusive Hastur servitor cards, the Necronomicon evil tome bonus card and 4 exclusive servitor cards for each Great Old One deck goal that is reached and their name will be listed in the acknowledgements under Servitors of the Old Ones. If they pledge $60 (only for local retailers) or more they will also receive four copies of Wrestlenomicon and their store's name, city, state, and country will be listed in the acknowledgements under Stores Destroyed and on their website. If they pledge $100 or more they will also receive a personalized Cultist card which will feature a cultist with their likeness and their name will be listed in the acknowledgements under Willing Sacrifices. If they pledge $2,000 or more they will also receive a custom Championship belt featuring the Great Old One of their choice, 2 copies of Wrestlenomicon, 2 of every reward unlocked, their likeness will be featured on a cultist card as the high priest and their name will be listed in the acknowledgements as the Cosmic Champion.
