= Nephilim (role-playing game) =

Tabletop role-playing game

Occult roleplaying
- Designers: Fabrice Lamidey; Sam Shirley; Greg Stafford; Frédéric Weil
- Publishers: Multisim [fr], Chaosium, Mnémos
- Publication: 1992 1st edition (French); 1994 (English)
- Genres: Occult, Modern, Historical
- Systems: Basic Role-Playing

Nephilim is a role-playing game about powerful elemental entities reincarnating into human beings. The players take the roles of these beings as they adapt to their newly symbiotic existence and learn the secrets hidden behind veils of obscurity and mysticism, seeking the path toward enlightenment, Agartha. The game contains much symbolism, primarily related to the Hermetic tradition.

== History ==
Nephilim was originally published in 1992 by the French company Multisim [fr]. The first edition used Chaosium Basic Role-Playing, and in 1994 was translated into English by Chaosium as well, with some additional research and writings by Kenneth Hite.

Since then, Nephilim had three other editions (all three in French, from Multisim/Mnémos) - the second edition was still akin to the BRP system while the third edition, Nephilim : La Révélation (The Revelation) uses a radically different, descriptor-based, system. It also introduces Ar-Kaïm and intuitive magic in the style of Mage: The Ascension (although based on elements and words instead of spheres). The fourth edition has its own unique system as well, using a scale ranging from 1 to 25 and difficulty multipliers to obtain percentages. Its core book as for the first two editions is centered on Nephilim. The fifth edition, called Nephilim Légende (Nephilim Legend) was released in 2019 by Mnémos following a crowdfunding campaign on the Ulule platform. It brings a new system, based on a scale from 1 to 10, that is then multiplied by 10 to obtain a percentage. This new edition update the settings to the context of the late 2010s, re-published after update some older and unavailable sourcebooks as well as adding some new materials, like the Golden fleece campaign.

== Setting ==
Nephilim is a game based on the idea that since ancient times there have been spirits without bodies who, given the right circumstances, can take over the body of a human and use it until it dies, then try to find another body. These spirits are the Nephilim.

Players get to choose one of five types of Nephilim. Within each of these types are different species of Nephilim. Each type of element or "Ka" has different strong points. Fire Nephilim (Pyrim) tend to be aggressive, Earth Nephilim (Faërim) are caretakers and healers, Air Nephilim (Éolim) are intellectuals, Water Nephilim (Hydrim) relate to change and movement and Moon Nephilim (Onirim) are secretive and manipulative. They are also defined by the major Arcana they choose to follow.

The spirit of the Nephilim takes over the body of a human and tries to gain the skills and knowledge the human has, while avoiding the Immortals' enemies. The Nephilim's ultimate goal is to attain Agartha, a form of spiritual illumination. Other races have a similar goal.

Nephilim can be set in any times from ancient Egypt to present day or the future.

Besides the Nephilim, the players can play Selenim ("Vampires" of the Dark Moon, an element created by an ancient race that is unstable and corrupts Nephilim) or Ar-Kaïm (Astrological unstable mutants, introduced in the Third Edition).

Several human secret organizations know of the existence of the Nephilim. Most of these organizations oppose or hunt the Nephilim, but some are sympathetic to their cause. The Knights Templar is one of the primary sources of antagonists for Nephilim, who along with the Rosicrucians supply the most organized opposition. The Order of the Black Star possess many magical secrets, but are fewer in numbers and less likely to team up against Nephilim.

== Game mechanics ==
The English language edition of Nephilim uses the Basic Role-Playing system used in many other Chaosium products, such as Call of Cthulhu, Pendragon and RuneQuest. It is expanded to suit the setting, amongst other things each nephilim has a set of elemental attributes influencing the body in which it resides.

== Published books ==
Books published for the original French version include:

- Loa

Chaosium published the following books in its version of Nephilim RPG, until its discontinuation:

- Nephilim : Occult Roleplaying : Core Rule Book;
- Chronicle of the Awakenings : contains more Incarnation Eras and Gamemaster resources;
- Secret Societies : has information on human occult organizations and how they interact with Nephilim;
- Major Arcana : very detailed information about the Arcana, the Nephilim Organizations and many campaign ideas.
- Gamemaster's Companion : optional rules and resources;
- Serpent Moon : a series of four adventures that can be made into a campaign;
- Liber Ka : alternative rules for magic, of the western ceremonial type (subtler effects, no Hollywood flash-bang magic).

In addition, Chaosium published a Gamemaster's Veil and Character Dossiers.

Some of the books published for Nephilim's Third Edition (by MultiSim in French) include:

- Nephilim : La Révélation : Core Rule Book;
- Arcanes mineurs : has information on human occult organizations and how they interact with Nephilim;
- Guide du maître de jeu : optional rules and resources;
- "Nephilim: Initiation" by UbIK: a quick start version of "Nephilim: La Revelation" done in 80 pages, copyrighted 2004

Some of the books published for Nephilim's Fifth Edition (by Mnémos in French) include:

- Nephilim Légende - Livre 0 Quintessence : Core Rule Book;
- Livre I: Les veilleurs du Lion Vert (The Watchmen of the Green Lion) : compilation, updated and upgraded to new context and new system of some 1st and 2nd editions material and scenario;
- Livre II: Arcanes Majeurs (Major Arcana) : very detailed information about the Major Arcana, the Nephilim Organizations and 3 scenarios;
- Livre III Templiers (The Knight templars) : very detailed information about one of the main enemy organisation and a mini campaign;
- Livre IV: Le Souffle du Dragon (The Dragon's breath) : re-edition updated and upgraded of one iconic Nephilim campaign set in French Brittany;
- Livre V: Selenim : re-edition of very detailed information about the Selenim, the Black Moon vampires and a campaign;
- Livre VI: L'Éveil des éléments : a 32 pages scenario;
- Livre VII: La Nouvelle Ys : a 60 pages revamped and expended version of the introduction scenario published in the 1st edition Core book, involving the mythic city that is supposed to have sunk in the Brittany sea;
- Livre VIII: Eole : an 80 pages sand-pit campaign based on the Greek god of the winds;
- Livre IX: La Toison d'Or (The Golden Fleece) : a long campaign focusing on the Golden fleece mythology;

A second crowdfunding finished on 25/06/2020 and with this some new books will be published in April 2021

- Livre X: L'Atalante fugitive : a brand new 8 scenario campaign centered around the major NPC Atalanta (one of the five creator of Alchemy);
- Livre XI: L'Assemblée du Seuil : a revamped version of one iconic campaign set in Prague;
- Livre XII: Le Compact d'Arcadia : sourcebook about Arcadia, which is the meta-plot for this edition;
- Livre XIII: Le théatre de la mémoire : a campaign centered around the works of Shakespeare;
- Livre XIV: Constellation : a campaign in 8 scenario taking places in 8 different French cities;
- Le Livre XV L'Extraordinaire Tour de France de maître Jacques: sourcebook giving the setting of one occult town per French department;

== Reception ==
Steve Perrin reviewed Nephilim in White Wolf #46 (Aug., 1994), rating it a 3.5 out of 5 and stated that "Nephilim offers a whole other world of dread secrets tied into real occultism and elitism, as opposed to Lovecraft's creation. The two games will probably cross-fertilize each other."

In Issue 13 of Arcane, Andy Butcher noted that Nephilim gamemasters have to work very hard to prepare the game for play since the original rulebook did not contain a lot of information about running adventures. In reviewing the Nephilim Gamemaster's Companion, Butcher gave it a rating of 7 out of 10, calling it "a handy book for any struggling Nephilim referee, although you can't help thinking that some of this material would have been better off in the main rulebook."

== Reviews ==
- Valkyrie #1 (Sept., 1994)
- Casus Belli #72 (Nov 1992)
- Review in Shadis #16
- Rollespilsmagasinet Fønix (Danish) (Issue 6 - January/February 1995)
- Australian Realms #19
- Backstab #34
- Backstab #35

== See also ==
- Book of Enoch
- Nephilim
