= Nobilis =

Tabletop fantasy role-playing game

- Second edition cover 2002
- Designers: Jenna K. Moran
- Publishers: Pharos Press 1999; Hogshead Publishing 2002; Eos Press 2011
- Publication: 1999 1st edition; 2002 2nd edition; 2011 3rd edition
- Genres: Fantasy
- Systems: Custom (diceless resource-management, optional live action system)
- ISBN: 1899749306

Nobilis is a contemporary fantasy tabletop role-playing game created by Jenna K. Moran. Early editions were published under Moran's previous names, Rebecca Sean Borgstrom and R. Sean Borgstrom. The player characters are "Sovereign Powers" called the Nobilis; each Noble is the personification of an abstract concept or class of things such as Time, Death, cars, or communication. Unlike most role-playing games, Nobilis does not use dice or other random elements to determine the outcome of characters' actions, but instead uses a point-based system for task resolution.

== Setting ==
Nobilis draws on many sources, including Christian and Norse mythologies, but adds numerous unique details to its setting. Though the everyday world in the game appears much like our own, it is actually only the Prosaic Earth, a lie that the world told to itself in a desperate attempt to explain suffering, and a rationalized delusion which conceals the true reality that would plunge most mortals into madness: the Mythic Earth, an animistic world where everything has its own sentient spirit. In the Mythic, the Earth is really flat, and hangs somewhere among the vast boughs of the "world-tree", Yggdrasil. Countless worlds dot the branches of this world-tree, but at the top is Heaven, which is inaccessible to all but the angels (only one human soul in a billion is not turned away) and is the source of all beauty. Beneath the Earth, in the roots of Yggdrasil, is Hell, the source of all corruption. Around Yggdrasil, except above heaven (where it is open to the stars), is a mystical impenetrable curtain of blue flames known as the Weirding Wall.

Every class of objects and every concept is represented by a being of god-like power known as an Imperator. Each Imperator may govern from one to several of these Estates, and has effectively limitless control over them. The Imperators are engaged in a deadly struggle with the Excrucians, terrible beings from outside the Weirding Wall who wish to destroy reality; this struggle is known as the Valde Bellum. This war keeps Imperators busy in the Spirit World, so in order to maintain their affairs on Earth and in the other worlds they invest a shard of their soul in a human (or occasionally another animal or object), creating a Nobilis. Each Nobilis represents one of the Imperator's Estates; the group of Nobilis this forms, known as a Familia Caelestis, is typically loyal, both to each other and their Imperator.

The Imperator Lord Entropy oversees the actions of the Nobilis and enforces the Code Fidelitatis, the five laws he has established for them, in his Locust Court. The most notable and notorious of these, and the one most often broken, is the Windflower Law which states that no Noble is allowed to love another being. (In the first two editions, Nobilis can turn other humans into Anchors, whose every action they can control, but in order to do this they must first love or hate the person.)

To protect their physical forms from the ravages of the Valde Bellum, Imperators take a part of reality and partition it off into a self-contained, unique world which can take any form. This world, called a Chancel, both houses their physical bodies and is a spiritual reflection of it. Much like in the myth of the Fisher King, if the Imperator suffers, so does their Chancel.

Flowers have great significance to the Nobilis and their Imperators; earthly flowers are reflections of their heavenly counterparts and each has a meaning. For example, the gamemaster is known as the Hollyhock God because, in the world of Nobilis, hollyhocks represent vanity and ambition. This is because, according to the in-game story, the angels used flowers as a tool to control and direct the brunt of their powers when they created Reality. Each Nobilis and Imperator has a flower that represents them, and flowers are often used in their magical rites.

== Gameplay ==
Unlike most role-playing game systems, Nobilis does not use random elements in determining success in characters' actions. Instead, Nobilis uses a resource management system; players may spend Miracle Points to succeed at certain actions, but otherwise they rarely fail at what they set out to do. Instead of the action centering on whether or not the characters succeed, the emphasis is instead on the consequences of those actions. Since combat between Nobilis uses up Miracle Points very quickly and a Nobilis can easily defeat even great numbers of humans, social roleplaying is encouraged over combat. Though the characters may seem to have limitless power, in reality they must take into consideration both the outcome of every act and what other Powers or Imperators they may offend in the process.

=== First and second editions ===
In the first two editions, each character has 4 attributes: Aspect, which governs their ability to perform superhuman physical and mental acts; Domain, which covers their power over their estate; Realm, which determines how much power they have in their Chancel; and Spirit, which describes how much magical power the Nobilis has. Spirit creates the Auctoritas, a shield that protects them from the Miracles of other Powers. A character's Spirit also determines how many Anchors they may have. Each attribute has a number of Miracle Points associated with it.

The character creation system also makes Nobilis notable by giving players an unusual amount of control over the setting. In addition to creating their own characters – a process which already allows for considerable customization – the players create their Imperator and Chancel. Players receive a number of points to invest in their Chancel equal to the total amount they spent on their characters' Realm; they may use these to buy special attributes for their Chancel such as special technology or magical inhabitants. They do not receive any points for their Imperator, so they must take a corresponding drawback for every special attribute they wish their Imperator to have. Each Nobilis also has an Affiliation, which is a moral code they follow in order to regain Miracle Points, as well as character flaws called Limits and Restrictions. Much like their Affiliation, these allow the character to regain Miracle Points when they become an inconvenience.

=== Third edition ===
In third edition, each character again has 4 attributes, but this time they are: Aspect, which governs their ability to perform superhuman physical and mental acts; Domain, which covers their power over the substance of their estate; Persona, which covers their power over the properties of their estate (as defined by the player); and Treasure, which governs their power over their panoply, the objects, animals and people that represent who they are. Domain governs the Divine Mantle, an aura that makes it harder for hostile Miracles to overpower their own Miracles. Persona governs the Auctoritas Magister, a shield that protects them from the Miracles of other Powers. Each attribute has a number of Miracle Points associated with it.

Each character also has a set of Bonds and Afflictions, the rules of their nature. Bonds are those rules which need effort to maintain; Afflictions are those rules which simply happen, without effort. When Bonds and Afflictions become an inconvenience, they allow the character to regain Miracle Points. When a Noble confronts and overcomes significant obstacles and antagonists, or honors the properties of their estate, they also regain Miracle Points.

As in earlier editions, the Imperator and Chancel are created by the players, but the point-buy system has been dropped. Instead, the players work together on deciding the properties of both.

== Publication history ==
=== First edition ===
The first edition was an indie role-playing game printed on demand by Pharos Press in 1999 with cover art by Alphonse Mucha.

=== Second edition ===
In 2002 Hogshead Publishing printed the second edition. When Hogshead Publishing closed in 2003, the rights to the book returned to Borgstrom, but arrangements were made with Guardians of Order to publish the second edition.

The second edition is a coffee table-style book, with the cover designed by Universal Head, and with a ribbon bookmark. Full-page black and white art was commissioned for this book, in particular from Charles Vess and Michael William Kaluta; Borgstrom's flash fiction, set in the game world, fills its large margins. This edition won the Origins Award for Best Graphic Presentation Book Format Product 2002, and the 2003 Diana Jones Award for Excellence in Gaming. Guardians of Order ceased operations in 2006, with an announcement that they would attempt to find other publishers for their games.

The second edition of Nobilis was translated into French in 2002 by the Swiss company 2 Dés Sans Faces (2 dice without faces), and was available for sale before the original English edition. The French edition, for reason of available space, replaced the scenario from the English language book with an original scenario, set in a media-obsessed Chancel. A gamemaster's screen, titled Perfidie, was released in late 2002, with a small booklet including errata and the scenario from the English language book.

A single sourcebook was published for second edition, The Game of Powers, which provides rules for live action role-playing. Attempts to publish a second sourcebook, to be entitled A Society of Flowers, were unsuccessful until March 2008: part of the supplement was finally made available as a free pdf download from Eos Press or for a small fee from drivethrurpg.com, under the name Unlikely Flowerings. This document was the first of an announced series of "peculiar books" that would make available the whole "work version" of Society of Flowers. Then those peculiar books, completed and cleaned, would be released later in 2008 in hardcopy version. However, the second peculiar book and Society of Flowers were delayed following personal problems of the author, with the second peculiar book, Creatures, Clothed in Strangeness, eventually seeing release in September 2009 as a free pdf download from imago.hitherby.com.

=== Third edition ===
The third edition rulebook, titled Field Guide to the Powers, was published by Eos Press in 2011, as the first volume in the Nobilis: the Essentials range. It was initially released on PDF, to be followed by a print version. The cover art is by Ciaoffen 师晓蒙.

In the years following the release of the second edition, Borgstrom had changed her name to Jenna Katerin Moran, and the third edition was released under that name.

In September 2012, the first sourcebook for third edition was released, named Nobilis: Antithesis, Minibook 1i. It was only released through the OneBookShelf network (RPGNow, DriveThruRPG, etc.) in PDF and softcover print-on-demand formats.

=== Fourth Edition ===
A fourth edition of Nobilis is currently in development by Jenna Moran and was planned to be completed in late 2024. In May 2026, Moran uploaded a preview of the fourth edition to her Patreon page.

== Reception ==
In his 2023 book Monsters, Aliens, and Holes in the Ground, RPG historian Stu Horvath noted, "Presented with formality and a certain poetic flare [sic], it's a type of game that was strange by the standards of the day; and for its trouble, it has gained a reputation of impenetrability. This characterization is unfair, and the long line of approachability-minded storygames that have followed in the wake of Nobilis demonstrate that a reappraisal is warranted."

== See also ==
- Amber Diceless Roleplaying Game
- Incarnations of Immortality
