= GURPS Cabal =

2001 Role-playing game supplement for GURPS

- Designers: Kenneth Hite
- Publishers: Steve Jackson Games
- Publication: 2001; 25 years ago
- Genres: Horror, conspiracy, supernatural
- Systems: GURPS
- ISBN: 1-55634-429-5

GURPS Cabal is a supplement for the GURPS role-playing game, written by Kenneth Hite and published by Steve Jackson Games in 2001. GURPS Cabal depicts a modern-day secret society composed of vampires, lycanthropes and sorcerers. It is based on the first edition of GURPS Horror, and further developed in the second edition by J. M. Caparula.

== Contents ==
GURPS Cabal depicts a modern-day secret society composed of vampires, lycanthropes and sorcerers who study the underlying principles of magic and visit other planes of existence and was integrated into GURPS Infinite Worlds, the default setting for GURPS fourth edition.

=== Overview ===
The Cabal has roots in Kabbalah, and has appropriated concepts from Egyptian occultism and elsewhere to create a syncretic system of Hermetic magic.

The Cabal is strictly regimented. From lowest to highest, the ranks are: (Outer Circle) Initiate, Novice, Adept; (Middle Circle) Theorist, Practitioner, Philosopher; (Inner Circle) Master and Grand Master.

There are thirteen Grand Masters, listed below.

- Erzsébet Báthory, the Hungarian countess and vampire;
- Cagliostro, the Italian alchemist;
- John Dee, possibly history's greatest sorcerer;
- The Insidious Doctor Fang, the Oriental psionicist;
- Garravin, a legendary faerie warrior;
- Lord Kaas'sth'raa, a Serpent-Lord illusionist;
- Albert Garner Kavanagh III, owner of the technomagic Aeon Laboratories;
- Khaibitu-na-Khonsu, an ancient and completely insane Egyptian pharaoh;
- Koschei the Deathless, a fallen Slavic god;
- Marie Laveau, the Voodoo Queen of New Orleans;
- Oleupata Horsekiller, an ancient Scythian priestess;
- Erasmus Rooke, an eccentric magical engineer; and
- Athéne du Sarrazin, a beautiful German werewolf.

Many Cabalists speculate that there should be one more rank above that of Grand Master. The identity of the person with this rank is subject to many rumors.

=== Cosmology ===
In this setting, there are Four Realms of existence, based on the Jewish Sephiroth, or Tree of Life:

- Assiah, the Material: the ordinary world;
- Yetzirah, the Astral: the dreamworlds;
- Briah, the Iconic: home to various pagan deities and the thirty-six decans, or philosophical building blocks of the universe;
- Atziluth, the Spiritual: Heaven.

Only the thirteen Grand Masters have ever visited Atziluth and been face-to-face with the creator of the universe. Suspiciously, none of them act particularly devout.

== Publication history ==
GURPS Cabal is a soft-bound book written by Kenneth Hite and published in 2001 by Steve Jackson Games.

== See also ==
- List of GURPS publications
