= Loa (Nephilim) =

Loa is a 1998 role-playing game supplement published by MultiSim for Nephilim.

== Contents ==
Loa is a supplement in which an epic campaign is centered on voodoo, love, and exploring the mysteries of the Damned.

== Reviews ==
- Casus Belli #117
- Backstab #12
