= Unknown Armies =

Tabletop role-playing game

- Unknown Armies third edition cover
- Designers: John Scott Tynes, Greg Stolze
- Publishers: Atlas Games
- Publication: 1998
- Genres: Urban fantasy, postmodern magic, horror
- Systems: Custom

Unknown Armies is an occult-themed roleplaying game by John Scott Tynes and Greg Stolze, published by Atlas Games. The first edition was published in 1998, with the second and third editions being released in 2002 and 2017 respectively. The game is set in a postmodernist occult underground where characters wield magick by personal belief.

== System ==
Unknown Armies uses a percentile dice system where checks are made by rolling two 10-sided dice, with one representing the "tens" and the other representing the "singles" digit (d100 for short). The game uses a 'roll-under' system, where the goal is to roll below the target number. Similarly, a roll of 1 is a critical success, while a roll of 00 (100) is a critical failure.

Players can start off as mundanes, Avatars, or Adepts. The benefit of the latter two is that one finds themselves in tune with some mystic force, and are most likely clued in to the Occult Underground. An Avatar is a person that channels an "Archetype", a powerful and universal role in culture. Examples include the mystic hermaphrodite, the hunter, and the demagogue. Adepts have spells related to certain obsessions, and must power themselves with related activities. However, playing mundanes also has its advantages as one can spend their points on aspects other than an Avatar's or Adept's power.

Each character's statistics are split into 4 main categories:

- Body – deals with main physical skills
- Speed – deals with dexterity based skills
- Mind – deals with mental skills
- Soul – deals with personality and "spiritual" based skills

The system is considered flexible in that players can choose their own skills.

Each player's character also starts off with an obsession (something the character is passionate about) and assigns a relevant skill. For example, an obsessive stamp collector will most likely have the appraise skill as an obsessive skill.

The system also introduces the concept of flip-flopping, where players who are using their obsession skill can choose to switch the "tens" and "singles" of their dice rolls (for example, turning 74 into 47).

There are also 5 madness meters, which help catalogue your character's sanity:

- Violence – Represents your character's reaction to violent acts
- Unnatural – Represents your character's reaction to the unnatural
- Helplessness – Represents your character's reaction in helpless situations
- Isolation – Represents your character's reaction in periods of isolation/loneliness
- Self – Represents your character's ability to deal with issues relating to identity

The madness meter is considered one of the best game-mechanics for handling the issue of a PC's sanity in a game of literally mind-destroying horror. They reappear in the Nemesis RPG, albeit without the Isolation meter.

== Reception ==
A reviewer from the online second volume of Pyramid wrote "Picture a world built of the magical illumination of Tim Powers and the gritty, brutal action of James Ellroy. Picture it filmed by an alchemical blend of John Woo and Quentin Tarantino. Add a hard-charging Steve Earle/Nick Cave soundtrack, and watch the movie in the rattiest, creepiest theater you can think of in the baddest part of town. Multiply all that by eleven, and you'll be close to Unknown Armies."

In Issue 12 of the French game magazine Backstab, Michaël Croitoriu commented, "Although Unknown Armies might make you think of Kult or Mage: The Ascension, in reality it has absolutely nothing to do with them. UA is a game that, depending on the actions of the players, can shift from horror to comedy, from violence to anger." Croitoriu concluded by giving the game a rating of 7 out of 10, saying, "In short, it's a pleasant surprise.".

In Issue 116 of the French games magazine Casus Belli, Tristan Lhomme noted "The game system is simple. We easily recognize a background of Call of Cthulhu and a ladle of Cults & Conspiracies [Non Sequitur Productions, 1997], all making up a simple and effective cocktail, with four abilities, some skills to refine yourself, all determined via percentages. In short, nothing too unusual. The combat system, designed to be frighteningly deadly, fulfills its role perfectly ... Everything about magic can be understood in a single reading without aspirin, and is scary." Lhomme lauded the sanity system, saying, "There remains the undeniable gem that is the rules of mental health. They are original, well done and much better thought out than those from Call of Cthulhu — which is no small compliment!" Lhomme concluded, "Unknown Armies is a good, rich game that will please horror fans wanting a change of scenery. It has the potential to become a classic."

Unknown Armies was included in the 2007 book Hobby Games: The 100 Best. Writer and game designer Kenneth Hite commented "Unknown Armies tells us that the only reality is what human beings choose to make of it, and frightens us with the thought that only insane people care enough to really change it. But for all that, it remains a game of alchemical optimism at its heart—from madmen and loners on the margins of society, a better world can come. If they want it enough to fight all the other madmen and loners to the death, and risk losing the rest of themselves, that is."

In his 2023 book Monsters, Aliens, and Holes in the Ground, RPG historian Stu Horvath commented on the sanity system, saying, "Distilling such a nuanced topic into mechanics is always going to be fraught, but Unknown Armies improves upon the archaic and often offensive system of the past ... In fact, what Unknown Armies leaves out is telling: The rules explicitly state that multiple personality disorder and schizophrenia are not included as possible consequences of failed sanity checks because including them would trivialize those conditions." Horvath concluded, "By frankly explaining their reasoning in the text of the rules, the designers of Unknown Armies were inviting further discussion, and that conversation is still ongoing more than two decades later."

== Awards ==
The second edition of Unknown Armies won the 2003 Gold Ennie Award for "Best Non-Open-Gaming Product".

== Other reviews and commentary ==
- Pyramid – Second Edition
- InQuest 50
- Backstab #47

== See also ==
- The Ascension of the Magdalene
