= Night Stalker =

Night Stalker(s) or Nightstalker(s) may refer to:

== Criminals ==
- Richard Ramirez (1960–2013), serial killer whose murder spree in California in the mid-1980s led to him being known as the "Night Stalker"
- Joseph James DeAngelo (known as the "Original Night Stalker"), serial killer and rapist who operated in Southern California from the late-1970s to mid-1980s
- Delroy Easton Grant, a serial rapist who operated in London during the 1990s and 2000s, sometimes referred to by the British media as the "Night Stalker"

== Arts and entertainment ==
=== Film and television ===
- The Night Stalker (1972 film), a 1972 made-for-television movie starring Darren McGavin
  - Kolchak: The Night Stalker, a 1974 television series based on the movie, starring Darren McGavin
  - Night Stalker (TV series), a 2005 remake of the original Kolchak series
- The Night Stalker (1987 film), a 1987 horror film starring Charles Napier
- Nightstalker (film), a 2002 horror film directed by Chris Fisher
- Nightstalker, a 2009 horror film directed by Ulli Lommel
- The Night Stalker (2016 film), a 2016 psychological thriller directed by Megan Griffiths and starring Lou Diamond Phillips
- Night Stalker: The Hunt for a Serial Killer, a 2021 Netflix documentary miniseries

=== Literature ===
- Meg: Nightstalkers, a 2016 science fiction horror novel by Steve Alten
- Nightstalkers (comics), a horror fiction comic book
- The Night Stalker, a book by James Swain
- The Night Stalkers, a book by Michael Durant and Steven Hartov about the U.S. Army's 160th Special Operations Aviation Regiment

=== Music ===
- Nightstalker (band), a Greek stoner rock band
- "Nightstalker", song from the 1993 album Sinister Slaughter by extreme metal band Macabre
- Sleepwalker (The Kinks song), a song whose course repeats the phrase "night stalker."
- Night Stalkers (song), a 2022 song by Megadeth

=== Other media ===
- Night Stalker (video game), a 1982 video game for the Intellivision
- Bryan Clark (born 1964), professional wrestler known as The Nightstalker
- Nightstalker, an alternative character class in Dungeons and Dragons
- A species of predatory flightless bat in the book After Man by Dougal Dixon

== Other uses ==
- 160th Special Operations Aviation Regiment (Airborne), a United States Army unit nicknamed the "Night Stalkers"

== See also ==
- Darkstalkers
- Night Prowler (disambiguation)
