= Unhallowed Metropolis =

2007 role-playing game

Unhallowed Metropolis is a 2007 role-playing game published by Eos Press.

== Gameplay ==
Unhallowed Metropolis is a game in which two centuries after a zombie plague nearly annihilated humanity, the Neo‑Victorians have rebuilt a haunted, dystopian society where alchemy, mad science, and undead horrors define the world.

== Reviews ==
- Black Gate
- Rebel Times #10
- Game Trade Magazine (Issue 94 - Dec 2007)
- Irregular Magazine (Issue 3 - Winter 2010)
- WIRED
