= Monsters and Other Childish Things =

Tabletop role-playing game

- Completely Monstrous Edition
- Designers: Benjamin Baugh
- Publishers: Arc Dream Publishing
- Publication: 2007, 2008
- Genres: Humour, Horror
- Systems: One-Roll Engine

Monsters and Other Childish Things is a comedy horror role-playing game about small children with horrible pet monsters. It is published by Arc Dream Publishing and written by Benjamin Baugh, with illustrations by Rebecca Ivey and Rob Mansperger. Initially available as a 52-page expansion of the Godlike rules in 2007, it was expanded into a "Completely Monstrous Edition" in 2008. This later version is an independent game using its own variation of the One-Roll Engine. The Completely Monstrous Edition was republished in conjunction with Cubicle 7 Entertainment in a smaller, softcover format as the "Pocket Edition" in 2010.

== Setting ==
The world of Monsters is much like the real world, except that monsters are real. Monsters can take any form imaginable, but are universally terrible and powerful; they frequently combine elements from Lovecraftian cosmic horror (existing outside of normal dimensions, unnatural physiology etc.) and children's stories. They do not need to eat, drink or breathe, instead feeding on the emotional connections between human beings - especially children, with whom monsters form special bonds. They love their children and will do anything for them, though they are not necessarily obedient. It's mentioned that the world at large is aware of monsters, but because they are so good at remaining unnoticed children are usually the only humans with whom they interact.

Stories in Monsters revolve around the normal trials of childhood, aided and complicated by the monsters. The game is explicitly intended as allegory; Baugh says the monsters "represent lots of things"; the monsters form bonds only with children because they are more "emotionally exposed" than adults, who have learned to guard their feelings to protect themselves. This is combined with the fantastic setting to make a game which is serious in subject matter, but light-hearted in tone.

== System ==
The original edition of Monsters used a modification of the One-Role Engine as it appeared in Godlike, but the later Monstrous Edition uses a repurposed and simplified version of the system. As in other versions of the system, dice pools of d10s are used to determine the outcome of actions; success is determined by sets of dice which show the same number. In Monsters, the traditional stats and skills are replaced by more childlike descriptions of a person's capabilities; instead of "Strength", "Dexterity" etc. the stats are named "Hands", "Feet", "Guts" and so on. The skills are similarly modified. An important addition are relationships; these are any person or thing important to the character, and can add dice to appropriate roles. For example, a kid with a relationship with his mother might add dice to rolls to escape a kidnapper if he fears he'll never see her again. All kids have a special relationship with their monster called the bond.

Monsters do not have regular stats and skills; instead points, each worth five dice, are allocated directly to body parts which can be used to Attack, Defend or do Useful Stuff (movement, senses etc.). Dice allocated to a body part can be sacrificed to gain special attributes; these include adding extra basic abilities (so the same body part can both Attack and Defend), adding more useful abilities, improving damage, defence or speed, or allowing one die from the pool to be set by the player (before or after the roll, depending on the dice spent on this quality).

The book also includes notes for using the Monsters rules with other versions of O.R.E.

== Books ==
As well as the three versions of the main game, adventures and expansions have been published for Monsters. Creator Baugh wrote The Dreadful Secrets of Candlewick Manor, a campaign sourcebook which presents an alternate take on the basic setting, and Bigger Bads, an expansion which adds additional options for monsters. Bigger Bads was funded through Kickstarter. Road Trip and Curriculum of Conspiracy were written by Ross Payton.

== See also ==
- Godlike
- Wild Talents
