= The Ascension of the Magdalene =

The Ascension of the Magdalene is a 2002 role-playing game adventure published by Atlas Games for Unknown Armies.

== Plot summary ==
The Ascension of the Magdalene is an adventure in which the setting is 1610 Prague, where political and mystical factions vie for Caravaggio's eldritch painting amid occult intrigue, new magic systems, and Renaissance weaponry.

== Reviews ==
- Pyramid
- Backstab #46 (as "L'Ascension de Marie-Madeleine")
- Campaign Magazine (Issue 4 - Jul/Aug 2002)
