= Nephilim Gamemaster's Companion =

Nephilim Gamemaster's Companion is a 1996 role-playing game supplement published by Chaosium for Nephilim.

== Contents ==
Nephilim Gamemaster's Companion is a supplement in which substantial preparation and thematic clarity is provided. It opens with a sweeping history—from the dawn of the universe to the present—which sets the tone and also shapes the worldview. Subsequent chapters delve into magical items, including those crafted by Nephilim and rarer artifacts, and introduce a collection of elemental creatures, examined both in mechanical terms and as roleplaying entities. The main part of the book includes guidance for campaign design, offering advice and examples. This continues with a sample campaign centered on the San Francisco Bay Area.

== Publication history ==
Shannon Appelcline noted that "Nephilim was not an easy game to figure out and the rulebook did not offer sufficient guidelines for what a campaign might look like. The lack of adventures just made this problem worse. Chaosium would only ever publish one adventure book for Nephilim, Serpent Moon (1995), a full year after the original game release. The Nephilim Gamemaster's Companion (1996) tried to correct this problem by devoting almost 40 pages to Nephilim campaigns but with its release almost two years after the original game, it was too little too late."

== Reception ==
Andy Butcher reviewed Nephilim Gamemaster's Companion for Arcane magazine, rating it a 7 out of 10 overall, and stated that "In all, then, the Nephilim Gamemaster's Companion is a handy book for any struggling Nephilim referee, although you can't help thinking that some of this material would have been better off in the main rulebook."
