= Liber Ka =

Liber Ka is a 1997 role-playing game supplement published by Chaosium for Nephilim.

== Contents ==
Liber Ka is a supplement in which a complete replacement is offered for the game's original sorcery system with one rooted in Western occult traditions. The new mechanics are fully compatible with existing rules and character creation. Structured in three parts, the book begins with background material—fictional extracts that explore the history and philosophy of magic—followed by a comprehensive guide to the new ritual-based sorcery system. This approach emphasizes indirect, real-world consequences for magical actions, favoring psychological and metaphysical impact over overt supernatural effects.

== Reception ==
Andy Butcher reviewed Liber Ka for Arcane magazine, rating it a 6 out of 10 overall, and stated that "if this kind of thing offends you, stay clear. Although if this kind of game does offend you, it's probably best to stay clear of Nephilim itself as well."

== Reviews ==
- Backstab #12
