= Serpent Moon =

Tabletop role-playing game adventures

Cover art by Franck Achard and Jean Bey

Serpent Moon is an adventure published by Chaosium in 1995 for the short-lived role-playing game Nephilim .

== Description ==
In Serpent Moon, the Nephilim (the player characters) must stop the Templars, who intend to exploit an astrological convergence. The mini-campaign progresses through four loosely connected adventure scenarios:

1. "Past Lives": The Nephilim discover an agreement between the Templars and an evil wizard.
2. "Message from the Past": The Nephilim must recover an ancient stele from the clutches of a secret society and decipher its runes.
3. "The Hurdy Gurdy Man": The Nephilim encounter a circus troupe, and must investigate a series of murders.
4. "Culminations": The Nephilim must determine where the Templars will attempt their blasphemous ceremony and prevent it from being performed.

== Publication history ==
In 1994, Chaosium published the occult role-playing game Nephilim, which was based on a French role-playing game of the same name. Chaosium rushed to produce the game in time for Gen Con, but the rulebook did not explain how to develop a campaign, and players found the complex game difficult to understand. Chaosium only published one adventure for it, releasing Serpent Moon a full year after Nephilim's publication. The 122-page softcover was designed by Ark Angeli, Ben Chessell, Wayne Coburn, Ross A. Isaacs, and Liam Routt, with cover art by Drashi Khendup and Samuel Shirley, interior art by Dan Barker, Drashi Khendup, Samuel Shirley, Heather J. McKinney-Chernik, and cartography by Samuel Shirley.

== Reception ==
In Issue 6 of the UK magazine Arcane, Andrew Rilstone remarked "a Nephilim campaign turns out to be a little like supercharged Call of Cthulhu session - investigations, clues, secret cults and earth-shattering rituals. This makes the book hard work to read and demanding to run but, in the hands of a good referee with a feel for the Nephilim universe, potentially very rewarding to play." Rilstone concluded by giving the game an overall rating of 6 out of 10.
