= Wild Talents (role-playing game) =

Tabletop superhero role-playing game by Dennis Detwiller

Superhero Roleplaying in a World Gone Mad
- Wild Talents cover
- Designers: Dennis Detwiller; Greg Stolze
- Publishers: Arc Dream Publishing
- Publication: December 18, 2006
- Genres: Superhero
- Systems: One-Roll Engine

Wild Talents is a superhero role-playing game published by Arc Dream Publishing and written by Dennis Detwiller, with Greg Stolze, Kenneth Hite, and Shane Ivey, with illustrations by Christopher Shy, Sam Araya, and Todd Shearer. The game was shipped to customers worldwide on December 18, 2006.

== Publication history ==
Shannon Appelcline described the development of Wild Talents, stating that "It was something that the fans had long demanded: a game that extended the Godlike supers game beyond the constraints of World War II. Between 2003 and 2005, Detwiller and Ivey developed it on Arc Dream's mailing lists and a Yahoo! group — in full view of their fans and with full input from them." Appelcline noted that this work also led a spin-off fan project called Star ORE (2005), a free game designed by Shane Ivey that used the Wild Talents game system, but that "Unfortunately, as they approached publication of Wild Talents, Ivey and Detwiller realized that they didn't have the money to produce it. To that point, all of Arc Dream's products had been small, saddle-stitched books; the more expensive Godlike and Will to Power rules instead were published by Hobgoblynn. Arc Dream just didn't have the cash flow to publish a 300+ page full-color hardcover book, and they didn't appear to have a way to bootstrap themselves up." Appelcline noted that Greg Stolze came up with the idea of asking fans for money to finance the project as he had done with other projects before, and after Arc Dream followed this model in June 2006 they were able to publish the game with an initial print run of 1000 that sold out before the end of the year. Wild Talents was updated in 2010 for a second edition, and a partnership between Arc Dream and Cubicle 7 allowed greater opportunities for distribution.

== Setting ==
Wild Talents picks up the settings started by Godlike after the events World War II with the next step in development of the powers of the Talents. Unlike the first wave of Talents to emerge during World War II, these Wild Talents are unable to counteract each other's powers by will alone. Beyond being a follow-up to Godlike, Wild Talents includes tools and ideas for any superhero setting.

== System ==
The ORE System used by Wild Talents expands on the system introduced by Godlike. Dice pools of d10s are used to perform task checks where sets of matched dice determine success.

== Reception ==
The reviewer from Pyramid stated that "Beyond its mechanics, Wild Talents examines the formulation of the superhero universe, presents a sequel to Godlike as an example, and gives a gritty down-at-heel scenario suited to a low-powered Wild Talents game. All of this is presented in a clean looking hardback that includes some fantastic illustrations, of which there are not enough."

The reviewer for Superhero RPG liked the One-Role Engine, saying, "Once you get over a few terms that could be presented a little better, the One-Role Engine works beautifully for the game." The reviewer concluded with a guarded thumbs up, commenting, "I find some fault with a few drawbacks inherent in character creation [...] but the ORE system offers an unconventional, but well thought-out, way to resolve combat and other moments where the world hangs in the balance."

== Awards ==
In 2010, Wild Talents 2nd Edition was nominated for an ENnie Award as the year's best role-playing game.

== See also ==
- Godlike
