= The Prowlers =

Italian metal band

The Prowlers is an Italian heavy metal band. They have released five albums.

The band signed with Pure Steel Records for the release of 2009's Re-Evolution.

== Discography ==
- Souls Thieves (2003)
- Devil's Bridge (2006)
- Re-Evolution (2009)
- Point of No Return (2013)
- Closing Circle (2021)
