= Jenna K. Moran =

American game designer and novelist

Jenna Katerin Moran, previously known as Rebecca Sean Borgstrom and in early publications credited as R. Sean Borgstrom, is an American role-playing game (RPG) writer and designer, and novelist.

== Early life ==
While in high school, Moran began to play Dungeons & Dragons, and started to write related fantasy fiction. After high school, she attended Georgetown University, graduating with a Computer Science bachelor's degree in 1988. She then earned a PhD in Computer Science from Johns Hopkins University in 2000.

== Role-playing games ==
Moran began to write supplemental sourcebooks for existing RPGs, including four for Steve Jackson Games's urban fantasy RPG In Nomine, and five for White Wolf Publishing's epic fantasy RPG Exalted. She also co-authored various RPGs including Ex Machina, and the second and third editions of Exalted.

In the late 1990s, Moran began to create her own RPG universe, where she envisioned the player characters would be powerful servants of the gods who are attempting to save reality from destruction by the mysterious Excrucian Host. In 1999, the resultant diceless indie role-playing game Nobilis was released as a "print on demand" publication by Pharos Press. Pyramid called it "Complex, unique, and deeply touching, Nobilis is one of the most interesting small press RPGs in years." Moran released a second edition in 2002 with Hogshead Publishing, which became affectionately known as the "Great White Book" owing to its unusual 12x12" form factor.

In 2005, Moran was the primary author of the Weapons of the Gods RPG, the first role-playing game that Eos Press published in-house.

Moran continued to work with Eos, publishing the third edition of Nobilis in 2011, but it was later removed from sale after Moran and Eos parted ways. A revised version of the third edition was returned to market in 2022 with new layout and art.

In 2015, Moran created Chuubo’s Marvelous Wish-Granting Engine, an RPG with mechanical and setting links to Nobilis, set in a small pastoral Town stranded in an endless sea of colorful chaos. Many characters and archetypes in Chuubo are recognizable as characters or creature types that were present in Nobilis, but in a weaker (and often friendlier) form. The rules are also similar to those of its parent game, but include additional narrative mechanisms to help players apportion the spotlight and a "quest" mechanic in which players plot out their character arcs ahead of time, and then seek to move through their lives while hitting practical and thematic milestones written on provided "quest cards.". Player characters are frequently children or young adults, and their stories draw on sources such as the animated films of Studio Ghibli, children's literature and television, and folklore.

In 2020, Moran published the diceless RPG Glitch: A Story of the Not, flipping the original Nobilis plotline by presenting player characters who are retired Strategists of the Excrucian Host, those who were originally trying to destroy Creation, but who have abandoned the war and now seek to build lives for themselves while dealing with the fact that their skillset (as beautiful, terrifying riders of the apocalypse) are ill-suited to leading a normal life. The protagonists of Glitch are both physically and magically powerful, but often lack the wherewithal to perform normal mundane tasks, leading to ironic situations as they confront the gods themselves but are unable to make themselves breakfast before doing so. The system combines the quest system from Chuubo with the higher-powered mechanics of Nobilis, but introduces a new "Cost" system that measures a Strategist's power based on her willingness to burn herself out in order to achieve an objective.

== Novels ==
Moran has also written a number of novels, some associated with the Nobilis setting, while others are associated with her long-form web fiction Hitherby Dragons.

- An Unclean Legacy (2011) ISBN 9-781503-013087
- Fable of the Swan (2012) ISBN 9781500757311
- Jack o'Lantern Girl (2012) ISBN 9781301003754
- The Night-Bird's Feather (2022) ISBN 9798986656823

== Awards ==
At Gencon 2003, the second edition of Nobilis won the Diana Jones Award for Excellence in Gaming.

== Role-playing bibliography ==
=== Ash-Tree Earth ===
The following three games are considered to exist in a shared universe and have references to each other within the games.

==== Nobilis ====
- Nobilis: A Roleplaying Game (1st edition) ISBN 0-9673180-1-7
- Nobilis: The Game of Sovereign Powers (2nd edition) ISBN 1-899749-30-6
  - Creatures Clothed in Strangeness (2nd edition, supplement)
  - Unlikely Flowerings (2nd edition, supplement)
  - The Game of Powers: The Live-Action Supplement for Nobilis ISBN 1-899749-36-5
- Nobilis The Essentials Volume 1: Field Guide to the Powers (3rd edition) ISBN 978-0-9833659-0-7
  - Nobilis: Antithesis, Minibook 1i

==== Chuubo's Marvelous Wish-Granting Engine ====
- Chuubo's Marvelous Wish-Granting Engine
  - Fortitude: By the Docks of Big Lake (setting sourcebook)
  - Fortitude: The Legendary 139 (minor campaign book)
  - Fortitude: The Glass-Maker's Dragon (major campaign book)
  - Chuubo's Marvelous Wish-Granting Engine: The Halloween Special (adventure)
  - Techno Player's Guide (sourcebook)

==== Glitch ====
- Glitch: A Story of the Not

=== Exalted ===
Moran has authored the following books for the Exalted role-playing game:

- Exalted: The Sidereals ISBN 1-58846-669-8
- Exalted: The Outcaste ISBN 1-58846-671-X
- Exalted: The Fair Folk ISBN 1-58846-678-7
- Games of Divinity ISBN 1-58846-659-0
- Savant and Sorcerer ISBN 1-58846-675-2
- Exalted: Second Edition ISBN 1-58846-684-1
- Exalted: Third Edition

=== In Nomine ===
Moran wrote the following books for the In Nomine role-playing game:

- In Nomine: Superiors 1 - War & Honor ISBN 1-55634-409-0
- In Nomine: Ethereal Player's Guide ISBN 1-55634-430-9
- Liber Castellorum: The Book of Tethers ISBN 1-55634-365-5
- Liber Servitorum: The Book of Servants ISBN 1-55634-369-8

=== Other game books ===
- Denizens of San Angelo ISBN 1-890305-14-6
- Ex Machina ISBN 1-894938-01-1
- Warcraft: The Roleplaying Game - Manual of Monsters ISBN 1-58846-070-3
- Weapons of the Gods ISBN 0-9710642-6-1
- Wisher, Theurgist, Fatalist & Weaver of Their Fates (PDF) and the supplement That Languidly Dreamt Raif (PDF)
