= Beyond the Mountains of Madness =

Beyond the Mountains of Madness is a 1999 role-playing game adventure published by Chaosium for Call of Cthulhu.

== Contents ==
Beyond the Mountains of Madness is an adventure in which a 17-chapter Antarctic campaign is presented that serves as a comprehensive sourcebook on 1930s polar exploration.

== Reception ==
Beyond the Mountains of Madness won the Origins Award for "Best Roleplaying Adventure of 1999".

== Reviews ==
- Pyramid
- Casus Belli
