= Jim Dietz (volleyball) =

Coach

Jim Dietz is an American volleyball coach, entrepreneur, and writer based in central Illinois. As a coach, he led St. Anthony High School of Effingham, Illinois to its first state-qualifying appearance and Lincoln Land Community College of Springfield, Illinois to all of its four appearances at NJCAA Nationals, including three consecutive Final Fours. During this time he also helped found the Crossroads Volleyball Club of Effingham, and the Capital Area Volleyball Club of Springfield.

As an entrepreneur Dietz has both started and owned multiple companies, including JD Properties, the Game Emporium, and Jolly Roger Games. In these companies he successfully maintained retail and rental properties, managed a chain of game stores, and facilitated the publication of original board, card, and role-playing games from conceptualization to final sales.

As a writer Dietz has published multiple articles, novels, and blogs. His work covers topics ranging from scholarly pieces to coaching aids to fiction and collections of poetry.

== Personal life ==
Dietz was born June 14, 1968, and raised in Davenport, Iowa. Attending Iowa State University for his undergraduate studies, he studied political science, history, and creative writing in addition to serving in student government as the president of Foster House. While in graduate school at the University of Illinois, Dietz met his wife, Julie, and they married in 1993. Deitz earned a master's degree in history from the University of Illinois and a master's degree in English/composition from Iowa State.

During college and after Dietz held several jobs, ranging from disc jockey (KUSR-FM), to Instructor for the Adult Education program at Eastern Illinois University.

Dietz has taught history in both high school and college.

== Volleyball career ==
Dietz began his career in volleyball as a statistician/manager for the University of Illinois in 1990, before returning to Iowa State as a volunteer coach for the 1991 season. After that, he served as a graduate assistant for Jim Stone and the Ohio State University program for three years, including OSU’s last Big Ten title, and NCAA Final Four appearance in 1994.

Moving to Illinois after getting married, Dietz became involved with the Twin City Volleyball Club, coaching 16-and under age group for a year, before being hired at St. Anthony High School where he led the school to its first ever regional and sectional titles and a school-record 33 wins in 2000.

Dietz left St. Anthony after the 2003 season, and coached at Allen Community College in the Kansas Jayhawk Conference during the 2004 and 2005 seasons, compiling a record of 34-46, building the program to a victory over a national top-5 team, as well as taking a set from the 2005 national champions (the only set lost by the Johnson County team on its way to the national title).

Dietz also served as a volunteer at the World University Games.

In 2006, Dietz returned to central Illinois, assuming control of the Lincoln Land Community College (LLCC) program. During his time at LLCC, Dietz has a 410-142 record and has won 39 in-season tournaments during that time. Eleven Loggers have been named NJCAA all-American and seventeen have been named academic all-American during his time with the program.

LLCC reached the National Tournament for the first time in school history in 2012 and finished 11th with a record of 33-9. In his eighth season coaching at LLCC he had a 263-93 career record (.717 winning percentage). Dietz was selected by USA Volleyball as an apprentice coach for its High Performance Tryout, as one of four coaches to help lead the USA Girls Future Select National Skills Program from July 29 to August 1, 2014 at the University of Nevada, Las Vegas. Dietz was named the American Volleyball Coaches Association Two-Year College Midwest Region Coach of the Year in 2015. In 2015 and 2016, LLCC reached the national championship game with consecutive 40-win seasons. In 2017, Lincoln Land reached the Final Four, finishing with a 37-7 record. The Loggers finished in the top five of the NJCAA National Poll in each of those seasons. The 2018 season was a difficult one for Dietz as players suffered concussions, infections, mangled hands and sprained ankles. Dietz got his 500th victory with the Loggers in 2019 when they defeated Illinois Valley and Sauk Valley in a pair of matches on at the Parkland Tournament.

Dietz suffered lingering complications from COVID-19 and retired midseason in 2021 after achieving a record of 513-196 in 16 seasons and leading the Loggers to three NJCAA Division II Final Fours. Deitz lives in Egginham with his wife Jule, where he operates The Dietz Foundation nonprofit charity as its CEO and managing director.

=== Head coaching record ===
Year	School	Record	Conference	Postseason	Final rank
1996	St. Anthony	26-5	1st	Sectional Semis	-
1997	"	13-16	3rd	Regional Semis	-
1998	"	18-12	2nd	Regional Semis	-
1999	"	24-7	2nd	Sectional Semis	-
2000	"	34-3	1st	Sectional Semis	-
2001	"	30-6	1st	State Qualifier	-
2002	"	18-16	1st	Regional Semis	-
2003	"	20-12	3rd	Regional Semis	-
2004	Allen County CC	16-24	5th	Regional VI Semis	Not Ranked
2005	Allen County CC	18-22	5th	Region VI Semis	Not Ranked
2006	Lincoln Land CC	29-21	3rd	Region XXIV Runner-Up	Not Ranked
2007	"	38-14	2nd	Region XXIV Runner-Up	21st
2008	"	33-14	2nd	Region XXIV Runner-Up	18th
2009	"	34-12	3rd	Region XXIV Runner-Up	Not Ranked
2010	"	34-11	2nd	Region XXIV Runner-Up	21st
2011	"	34-13	2nd	Region XXIV Runner-Up	18th
2012	"	33-9	2nd	11th at Nationals	7th
2013	"	33-8	2nd	Region XXIV Runner-Up	17th
2014	"	25-18	2nd	Region XXIV Runner-Up	Not Ranked
2015	"	40-6	2nd	National Runner-Up, 4th	4th
2016	"	40-9	2nd	National Runner-Up, 4th	4th
2017	"	37-7	2nd	3rd at Nationals	5th
LLCC Record	410-142				
Overall Record	624-268				

Aside from his work as a head coach in schools, Dietz is known to conduct summer camps at Lincoln Land as well as for other institutions. Most notably he has previously been involved with the USA Volleyball High Performance Pipeline.

== Game company ownership ==
Dietz was a graduate student when he created his first game, which was about the American Civil War, but his lack of experience led to difficulties with finding a publisher. Dietz founded Jolly Roger Games in 1996, owning it until it was sold in 2015 to Ultra Pro, International. Dietz served as the president and chief executive officer of Jolly Roger Games, where he focused on publishing, editing and developing board games. Jolly Roger Games remained an independent division, with Jim Dietz continuing to lead its operations. Dietz designed the role-playing games Swashbuckler (first and second editions) and Parsec, and the board games A Nation on Trial: The U.S.Civil War, Fire Brigade: World War Two, Orcs at the Gates, and Last Man Standing. Under Dietz’s ownership, JRG published award-winning and highly acclaimed games including designs by Alan R. Moon (Surf's Up, Dude), Richard Launius (Pirates vs. Dinosaurs), Jason Matthews/Christian Leonhard (Founding Fathers), and Urs Hostettler (republishing of Kremlin).
