= Weapons of the Gods (role-playing game) =

Tabletop role-playing game

Wuxia Action Series
- Designers: Rebecca Borgstrom; Brad Elliott
- Publishers: Eos Press
- Publication: November 21, 2005
- Genres: Chinese, Martial arts, Fantasy
- Systems: Wuxia Action System

Weapons of the Gods is a wuxia role-playing game based in an ancient Chinese setting. Created by Brad Elliott and Jenna Moran, Weapons of the Gods is published by Eos Press and is a license from the Hong Kong manhua by Wong Yuk Long of the same name. The first supplement for the game, The Weapons of the Gods Companion, was released in December 2007.

== Publication history ==
Weapons of the Gods was published in 2005 - years after it was announced - as the first in-house RPG from Eos Press.

== System ==
Weapons of the Gods uses a custom-designed ruleset called the "Wuxia Action System". The player rolls the number of specified dice equal to the character's skill. The player then looks for matching dice. For each match, the player multiplies the number of matches by ten and adds the value of the dice in the match. For example, a roll of five dice showing 3,3,6,8,0 is a 23 (or 18, 16, or 10, should the player want a lower result).

The Wuxia Action System is also notable for the concept of the River, a small stock of dice that can be saved from any sets of matches for later use; this models the aspect of wuxia stories in which a badly battered combatant can summon a hidden reserve of strength later in the battle, even when badly wounded.

Lore sheet is a game design representing knowledge and engagement of the players in a single part of the setting. Players can invest experience points in them to be the expert on that part and to secure some future events related. Doing so, they show there are interested in this part of the campaign.
