= Eos Press =

Game publisher

EOS SAMA LLC, dba Eos Press
- Type: Privately held company
- Industry: Role-playing and card games publisher
- Founded: 2001
- Headquarters: Seattle, Washington, United States; Suzhou, Jiangsu, China
- Number of locations: 2
- Key people: Hsin Chen, Brad Elliott, Jenna Moran, Jesse Covner, David Ramirez
- Products: Weapons of the Gods, Lesser Shades of Evil, Abuse: The Final Insult, Creatures & Cultists, Unhallowed Metropolis, Delta Green
- Website: eos-sama.com

Eos Press is an American game publisher named for the ancient Greek goddess of the dawn. It was established in 2001 in Seattle, Washington, as "Hawthornn Hobgoblynn Press". Eos has operations in Suzhou (China), Taiwan and Singapore.

== History ==
Financier and businessman Hsin Chen and Aron Anderson (game designer and owner of The Dreaming, a Seattle comic and game store) founded Hawthorn Hobgoblynn Press on January 12, 2001, to publish Godlike, a game created by their friends Dennis Detwiller and Greg Stolze. In 2003 they renamed the company "Eos Press" and business manager Brad Elliott became the third partner. Brad Elliott left the company in March 2009, and the company was reformed by Hsin Chen (owner and director); adding Jesse Covner (partner and general manager) and David Ramirez (game project manager).

In 2010, Eos signed famed role playing game (RPG) designer and Nobilis creator Jenna Moran in an exclusive contract to create games and properties. Eos published the third edition of Nobilis and a supplement.

In 2015, Jenna Moran cut ties with Eos because of deceptive behavior by the company and repeated non-delivery of books paid for by the Chuubo's Marvelous Wish-Granting Engine Kickstarter. Later in the year, an anonymous donor contributed money to Jenna Moran so that print on demand copies could be distributed independently of Eos.

As of 2020, the company is inactive and may be defunct, as the website has not been updated since 2017.

== Products ==
Notable Eos Press products are card games Abuse: The Final Insult; Creatures and Cultists and The Wormwood Tarot, a Victorian, gothic tarot set.

Eos also publishes RPGs, including Godlike, under the name Hobgoblynn, as well as Unhallowed Metropolis, a game of neovictorian horror. Weapons of the Gods, the first licensed RPG published by Eos, is a Wuxia game inspired by the eponymous comic.
