= Delta Green: Countdown =

1999 role-playing video game

- Publisher: Pagan Publishing
- Publication date: 1999

Delta Green: Countdown is a 1999 role-playing game supplement published by Pagan Publishing for Call of Cthulhu.

== Contents ==
Delta Green: Countdown is a supplement for the Delta Green setting about international agencies, cults and conspiracies.

== Publication history ==
Shannon Appelcline explained that with the Delta Green setting, "the best-received book was a massive supplement three years in the making, Delta Green: Countdown (1999), in which Detwiller, Glancy, and Tynes massively expanded the setting". Blair Reynolds pained the cover, and this was his final published work for role-playing games for about a decade. Delta Green: Countdown had difficulty selling in Germany due to the country's censorship laws and the Nazi imagery present on the cover art.

In 2026, Countdown was re-released as Delta Green: The Millenium, as part of the Delta Green: The Conspiracy Kickstarter's stretch goals to update classic sourcebooks for the standalone Delta Green role-playing game.

== Reception ==
Delta Green: Countdown won the Origins Award for Best Roleplaying Supplement of 1999.

== Reviews ==
- Pyramid
- Backstab #19
- Casus Belli #122
