= Down Darker Trails =

Role-playing game

Terrors of the Mythos in the Old West
- Designers: Kevin Ross
- Publishers: Chaosium
- Publication: 2017; 8 years ago
- Genres: Horror
- Systems: Basic Role-Playing

Down Darker Trails is a 2017 role-playing game supplement published by Chaosium for Call of Cthulhu.

== Contents ==
Down Darker Trails is a sourcebook set in the American old west. Investigators assume the roles of cowboys, outlaws, lawmen, and other period-accurate professions in their struggle against the Cthulhu Mythos. It has rules for both the base Call of Cthulhu system and Pulp Cthulhu. The book also contains two adventures.

== Reception ==
John O'Neill reviewed Down Darker Trails for Black Gate, and stated that "CoC has been sorely lacking a weird western sourcebook, so I was very pleased to see Kevin Ross and his friends at Chaosium release Down Darker Trails, a massive full-color 256-page hardcover which lovingly brings Mythos horror to the old west. The book is an excellent addition to Chaosium's catalog".

Down Darker Trails won the 2018 Silver ENnie Awards for Best Monster/Adversary.
