= One-Roll Engine =

Generic role-playing game system developed by Greg Stolze

The One-Roll Engine (or O.R.E.) is a generic role-playing game system developed by Greg Stolze for the alternate history superhero roleplaying game Godlike. The system was expanded upon in the modern-day sequel, Wild Talents, as well as the demonic supervillain game Better Angels, the Film Noir game A Dirty World, the heroic fantasy game Reign, and the free horror game Nemesis. A simpler version was used for Monsters and Other Childish Things. The One-Roll Engine is notable for its unique dice rolling system in which matched values on ten-sided dice (d10s) determine all variables of a check in a single roll. This eliminates, for example, the separate initiative, hit location and damage rolls common during combat in other systems.

== Mechanics ==
The One-Roll Engine uses a dice pool of d10s equal to the character's Stat and Skill similar to that used by Storyteller system. Since the dice are always d10s, a pool is written as the number of dice followed by a "d"; for example, a pool of six dice would be written "6d".

While most dice pool systems count the number of dice which roll above a certain number to determine success, the O.R.E. system instead depends on matching dice, such as a pair of dice showing 8 or three dice showing 2. Matching dice are called a "set"; the number of matching dice in a set is called the "Width", while the face up number on the dice is the set's "Height". Shorthand notation for writing results is Width x Height, so a pair of 8s would be written 2x8 and three 2s would be written 3x2.

A roll may have more than one set; the player can usually choose which one to use. If there are no matches, then the player may select a single die to act as a set with a Width of 1. In general, a set's Width determines the speed of an action, while the Height determines how successful the action was. In combat, Width and Height also determine the damage and hit location.

Powers, such as those possessed by superhuman Talents in Godlike, are modeled with special dice. "Hard Dice" are considered to always have a value of 10, while "Wiggle Dice" have a value assigned by the player after the rest of the pool is rolled. The shorthand notation for Hard Dice is hd and Wiggle Dice is wd, so a Dice pool of six regular dice, two Hard Dice and one Wiggle Die would be noted 6d+2hd+1wd.

Nemesis introduces "Expert Dice", which may be used as normal dice, or the player can select their value before the roll, but no two Expert Dice can be selected to have the same value. Expert Dice are also used as buffer against die penalties, where each Expert Die counteracts one die penalty, but then must be rolled as a normal die. NEMESIS also uses Wiggle Dice, but renames them "Trump Dice". The shorthand notation for Expert Dice is ed and Trump Dice is td.

Reign also uses "Wiggle Dice", but uses the name "Master Dice" (shorthand notation "md"). In this setting any dice pool could contain just one special die ("md" or "ed") and can never roll more than ten dice at once. (Excess allows offsetting penalties while still resulting in an effective pool of ten.)

In Better Angels instead of their dice pools being based on traditional statblocks, each character has competing traits for various aspects like Knowledge, Generosity, and Honesty on one side and Corruption, Greed, and Cowardice on the other which shift throughout the game based on a character’s actions and personal development. Each player controls both their human character as well as the demon ’screwtape’ for the player to their right, with the demon picking half of their supervillain host’s sinful stats, superpowers, and demonic aspects during character creation. "Master Dice" appear as one of the boons demons can tempt their hosts with as part of their plot to corrupt the souls of their well meaning hosts badly enough to enable them to be dragged to hell.

The simplified O.R.E. used in Monsters and Other Childish Things only uses special dice for monsters. Normal dice in a monsters' pools may be sacrificed during character creation for special qualities, one of which, "Awesome", grants a die that works like an Expert die in Nemesis. Taking the Awesome quality a second time makes the die function like a Wiggle Die. Monsters does not use Hard Dice, but other special qualities modify rolls in specific, more limited ways. For example, "Gnarly" adds one to damage in combat rolls, while "Wicked Fast" adds one to Width for the purposes of determining speed.
