= Delta Green =

Tabletop horror role-playing game and game setting

- Delta Green sourcebook cover
- Designers: Dennis Detwiller; Adam Scott Glancy; John Scott Tynes
- Publishers: Pagan Publishing; Arc Dream Publishing; Pelgrane Press (The Fall of Delta Green)
- Publication: 1997 (Sourcebook); 2016 (Arc Dream Publishing) (Standalone RPG); 2018 (The Fall of Delta Green)
- Genres: Horror, Conspiracy fiction
- Systems: Call of Cthulhu; GUMSHOE
- Parent games: Call of Cthulhu (original sourcebooks)
- Website: www.delta-green.com

Delta Green is a role-playing game from Arc Dream Publishing about a secretive organization tasked with protecting the United States from paranormal and alien threats. The setting combines the 1920s Cthulhu Mythos of H. P. Lovecraft with modern conspiracy fiction. It originated in 1992 as a setting for the Call of Cthulhu role-playing game, created by Adam Scott Glancy, Dennis Detwiller, and John Scott Tynes, a.k.a. the Delta Green Partnership, of the Seattle gaming house Pagan Publishing.

In 2016 the Agent's Handbook was released, followed by the Handler's Guide in 2018, giving the game its first standalone rule books. In 2018 Arc Dream also partnered with Pelgrane Press on a prequel game set in the 1960s. It is named The Fall of DELTA GREEN and uses the Gumshoe System.

Beyond the tabletop role-playing game, Delta Green has also spawned a line of fiction, including novels, anthologies, and short-story collections published since 1998 that expand the setting and mythology.

== Premise ==
Delta Green is a contemporary setting, starting in the mid-1990s, with intermittent updates thereafter. The game revolves around a fictitious secret organization, created by the U.S. Government following the covert raid on the town of Innsmouth, Massachusetts mentioned in H. P. Lovecraft's The Shadow over Innsmouth. The organization takes its name from its World War II-era codename.

Delta Green agents work undercover through other U.S. government agencies, recruiting across a wide range including the FBI, ATF, CIA, CDC, DEA and the U.S. Military. It appears to have "gone rogue" somewhere between the 1960s and the 1980s, following a disastrous operation in Cambodia and a "deal" struck by Reagan-era rivals in Majestic-12, ostensibly with "Greys". Delta Green combats not only incursions by entities from the Cthulhu Mythos, but also secret conspiracies and rogue organizations that seek to exploit Mythos entities, artifacts, and knowledge for political, military, or occult ends.

The 2016 edition advances the history to the 2010s. In 2001, the September 11 attacks greatly affect the Intelligence Community, including Delta Green and MAJESTIC-12. Majestic was weakened and destroyed, while Delta Green has been brought back into the government fold, given a budget and official standing, using the war on terror as a cover to their operation. There's also a group of old guard agents that were opposed to the restructure of Delta Green, preferring to maintain the old conspiracy running, forming their own splinter group known as "The Outlaws", as opposed to the official "Program".

The Fall of Delta Green, on the other hand, is a spin-off set during the 1960s, focusing on Delta Green's operations during the Cold War, in particular in Indochina and the Vietnam War, before the fateful operation that led to the original disbandment of the organization.

The group was introduced in the seventh issue of The Unspeakable Oath, a Call of Cthulhu fanzine created by Pagan Publishing, in early 1993. Four years later, the Delta Green supplement appeared and spawned a number of its own supplements and novels. The premise is similar to The X-Files (although the original incarnation of Delta Green preceded The X-Files by almost a year). Both draw on federal alphabet soup folklore, UFO conspiracy theories, cryptids and other modern legends, with Delta Green further weaving them through the lenses the Cthulhu Mythos. The aforementioned MAJESTIC-12 links the Cthulhu Mythos with UFO conspiracy folklore, incorporating themes such as Men in Black, Roswell incident, black helicopters, and government cover-ups through its alliance with the "Grey aliens", who are ultimately agents or disguises of Lovecraft's Mi-Go—who are, in turn, also responsible for many UFO sightings, alien abduction and cattle mutilation. The Karotechia (whose name derive from the real-life SS Hexenkartothek project) is an international network of former Nazi occultists, who escaped through Die Spinne and the ODESSA organization, seeking to establish a Fourth Reich through Mythos magic. The Cult of Transcendence is an Illuminati-like network of secret societies overseen by Nyarlathotep who seek control and moral decay of society.

Following the publication of the standalone role-playing game in 2016, the setting shifted away from many of the Ufology and Cold War conspiracy motifs that characterized the original supplements. While organizations such as MAJESTIC-12 and the Karotechia remained part of the setting's history, newer publications placed greater emphasis on contemporary institutions, social fragmentation and human actors whose ambitions are enabled by contact with the Cthulhu Mythos. The supplement The Labyrinth (2020), for example, introduces antagonistic organizations inspired by contemporary social phenomena, such as the Sowers, an extremist Christian fundamentalist movement empowered by "Azazel", a mask of Nyarlathotep, rooted in the economic decline of the American Rust Belt; New Life Fertility, a biotechnology company catering to ultra-wealthy elites through Mythos-influenced eugenistic reproductive services; the Lonely, a decentralized network of socially isolated individuals supernaturally radicalized through online communities; and the Prana Sodality, a wellness movement and healing cult built around supernatural phenomena.

The Delta Green supplement lays the groundwork for organized investigations into paranormal crime and horror, setting up the initial plot and providing players with their motivations and the resources they need to carry out their tasks. It also provides a source of replacements for characters who go mad or are killed. Canonical materials revolve around threats from the Cthulhu Mythos, but the framework is very flexible. Delta Green agents typically know little about the Mythos. While the scenarios and written material is centered around the United States, there are possibilities for international games too. Delta Green: Countdown introduced counterparts in the United Kingdom and Russia, called PISCES and GRU SV-8 respectively, as well as real-life international law enforcement and intelligence agencies, while Targets of Opportunity introduced the Canadian M-EPIC.

== Gameplay ==
The original 1997 edition of Delta Green was a sourcebook for Call of Cthulhu; as such, it used the Basic Role-Playing system that Call of Cthulhu had.

The 2016 standalone edition takes the percentile dice of Basic Role-Playing and Call of Cthulhu mechanics, and introduces modifications adapted for the setting. Player Characters are called "Agents" and the Game Masters "Handlers".

Sanity is rolled when characters meet unnatural horrors, as well as in violent situations and moments when the Agents feel helpless. Agents can "adapt" to violence and helplessness after failed Sanity checks, but excessive loss of Sanity can result in agents developing mental disorders. Delta Green introduces the concept of Bonds, which are the friends and family of the Agents, and Motivations, the reasons why the Agents fight. The latter serves as a character-expanding tool for players and a sanity-regulation mechanic, as they can be used to halve the SAN loss. At the point of their relationship with bonds, if the relationship points fall, the connection with the bond will be crossed out. With the bond mechanics, the Home scenes are also introduced. These are between-mission vignettes of the Agents' everyday lives. They can be about building relationships with bonds, investigating the unnatural, or going to the therapists, among others.

Gear and equipment can be requisitioned from the government organizations under which the Agent works, through the use of the Bureaucracy skill, with more expensive and advanced equipment increasing the difficulty of the roll. A failure might result in the Agent getting fired, blacklisted, or even arrested. Items can also be purchased using the Agent's personal wealth, though this can risk the Agent's relationship with their bonds.

Combat was also streamlined to be quicker, more tactical, and deadly. The main combat mechanic introduced is Lethality, weapons that deal damage above 2d10 have a "lethality rating" from 10% to 90%, if the percentile roll is below the rating the targeted enemy dies instantly; otherwise, the damage dealt is the sum of the percentile dice.

The Fall of Delta Green uses Pelgrane Press' own Gumshoe System that is also used in their other games such as The Esoterrorists, Fear Itself and Trail of Cthulhu. Unlike the standard D100/BRP system that both Call of Cthulhu and Delta Green use, in which many actions are subject to D100 rolls to determine outcome, the Gumshoe system emphasizes getting characters from scene to scene quickly, gathering clues and interpreting them using minimal rolls of a 6-sided die.

Fall of Delta Green also introduces new mechanics for the Gumshoe formula, adapting the new rules introduced by the standalone edition of Delta Green: Bonds and Motivations complement the sanity system (Itself based on the one used in Trail of Cthulhu), adaptation to SAN loss was included, Revelation works similarly to the "traumatic background" in Delta Green's character creation and a few new abilities were added, most prominently was the ability of "Agency" to represent the capability of the Player Character to manipulate their employing agency's (Such as the CIA, MACV-SOG or the Federal Bureau of Narcotics) resources in their investigations.

== History ==
The setting was first introduced in 1992 in the seventh issue of The Unspeakable Oath, Pagan Publishing's Call of Cthulhu fanzine, in the scenario Convergence, which would be later republished in the first Delta Green sourcebook. The scenario introduced Delta Green as a loose organization within the U.S. government dedicated to secretly fight the creatures from the Cthulhu Mythos. Convergence was also followed by a sequel named Transference published in Volume 2 Issue 2 of the Cyberpunk 2020 fanzine The Interface, although later published material disregards this scenario.

Pagan Publishing would then expand the setting resulting in the publishing of the Delta Green sourcebook in 1997. This was followed an additional sourcebook in 1999 titled Delta Green: Countdown.

On May 1, 2006, the Pagan Publishing homepage was updated with an announcement describing the reasons for the delay of the new release of Delta Green, and stating that the d20 edition of the game should be available in time for Gen Con Indy. While there were a few show copies available there were no copies available for sale to the public as most of them were "still being shipped from China". As of May 2007 the book, which is a reprint of the 1997 book with the addition of D20 stats, was finally reprinted and was available in stores.

A hardback compilation of the three Delta Green Eyes Only chapbooks, along with additional material, was released in November 2007. The book was published in cooperation with Arc Dream Publishing. The entire 1,000 copy print run was sold out by February 2008. The hardback edition of Delta Green: Eyes Only was a finalist for the Origins Award for Best Roleplaying Supplement of 2007. A softback version of the compilation followed in September 2008 and is available to retail distribution.

Pagan Publishing and Arc Dream Publishing began work in mid-2008 on a new sourcebook, Delta Green: Targets of Opportunity, which was released as a limited-edition hardback in June 2010, to be followed by a softcover retail edition. As of August 2011 the entire 1,000-copy print run of the hardback limited edition was sold out. In August 2011, Delta Green: Targets of Opportunity won silver (2nd place) Ennie Awards for Best Writing and Best Adventure.

Arc Dream Publishing released an ebook edition of the novel Delta Green: Denied to the Enemy in January 2011.

As of October 29, 2015, a Kickstarter Campaign by Arc Dream Publishing funded a series of new Delta Green products, converting the setting into a standalone role-playing game. On February 26, 2016, a quick-start rulebook Delta Green: Need to Know was released for free download with the Agent's Handbook following soon after on April 27, 2016. The Handler's Guide was released October 31, 2017, in PDF and on March 8, 2018, a compilation of several other Delta Green adventures released by Arc Dream was released in only one book Delta Green: A Night at the Opera, containing the adventures Reverberations, Viscid, Music from a Darkened Room, Extremophilia, Star Chamber and Observer Effect.

In February 2018, Pelgrane Press released The Fall of Delta Green, the Vietnam War game financed on the 2015 Kickstarter as a GUMSHOE counterpart to Delta Green's Basic Role-Playing.

On July 9, 2018, returning co-creator John Scott Tynes started a Kickstarter campaign to fund Delta Green: The Labyrinth, a new sourcebook containing "allies, enemies, mysteries, and surprises for your Delta Green campaign." It was released on November 12, 2019, in PDF and July 29, 2020, in physical format.

In 2018, Delta Green won six ENnies awards. Gold in Best Rules, Best Production Values for Delta Green: The Roleplaying Game and Best E-Book for Delta Green: A Night at The Opera categories; while Silver in Product of the Year and Best Game for Delta Green: The Roleplaying Game and Best Adventure for Delta Green: A Night at The Opera.

On April 18, 2019, the sourcebook Delta Green: The Complex was released, containing information on federal agencies and related professions that didn't appear in the Agent's Handbook, such as the ATF, NSA, Booz Allen Hamilton, United States Coast Guard among other federal law enforcement, intelligence, military and private contractors agencies that work for the US government. The Complex was written primarily by Christopher Gunning, a former U.S. Department of State employee, who had previously written the "federal agencies" section of the Agent's Handbook.

Later on April 24 of the same year, the collection of scenarios Delta Green: Control Group was released in PDF format, the scenarios in Control Group are meant to be introductory for both players and their characters, the scenarios use pre-made characters that are not in the Delta Green conspiracy. 2020 saw the release of Black Sites, similar to A Night at The Opera, it's a hardback collection of scenarios previously available only in PDF or paperback.

On January 25, 2021 Delta Green: Impossible Landscapes was released. It is Delta Green's first full-length campaign, centered around Hastur, The King in Yellow and Carcosa, with a bigger focus in surreal horror.

On August 10, 2021, Arc Dream started yet another Kickstarter campaign called Delta Green: The Conspiracy. The project is an updated re-release of the original Delta Green sourcebook (now retitled Delta Green: The Conspiracy) with new art, layout and aligned with the new edition's rules. The campaign was a success and it raised $513,158, more than any previous campaign. Beside the original sourcebook, the campaign also funded the rest of the original line of Pagan Publishing sourcebooks: Delta Green: Countdown (as Delta Green: The Millennium) and Delta Green: Eyes Only (as Delta Green: Machinations). Targets of Opportunity was divided in two books: Legacies, with the chapters of the Black Cod Island, M-EPIC, the Disciples of the Worm, and the DeMonte Clan, and Transcendence with the chapters of Cult of Trascendence. The scenarios in the original sourcebooks won't be released with the new ones; instead they will be released separately as paperback and then in one hardcover book called Delta Green: Incursions. Delta Green: Agencies will contain the U.S. and international agencies profiled in the annex of Delta Green and Countdown. The only new material will be Delta Green: Shotgun Scenarios. A "shotgun scenario" is a short standalone scenario that can fit into other, larger campaigns or scenarios. Many of them will be fan-made, coming from the community-run Shotgun Scenarios fan contest.

April 2022 saw the release of Iconoclasts, Delta Green's second campaign. It is set in 2016 during war against the Islamic State in Iraq, tasking players to infiltrate and investigate mysterious events going on inside the territory of the Islamic State of Iraq and Syria.

On October 13, 2023 Delta Green's third campaign God's Teeth was released. The campaign is set in 2001 and plays out over a 19 year timespan.

=== International publishing ===
In 1999, French publisher Jeux Descartes released the French edition of Delta Green for Call of Cthulhu. In 2011 Éditions Sans-Détour released Countdown, Eyes Only and Targets of Opportunity, as well the GM screen and re-release of the original sourcebook. In 2024, publisher Akileos launched a crowdfunding campaign for a French translation of the modern standalone edition of Delta Green published by Arc Dream Publishing. PDF editions were distributed to backers in 2025, with the physical books scheduled for release in 2026.

In 2024, Brazilian publisher RetroPunk started a crowdfunding campaign for the Brazilian Portuguese edition of Delta Green.

== Publications ==
=== Pagan Publishing game books ===
- Delta Green (February 1, 1997), the basic sourcebook; ISBN 1-887797-08-4.
- Delta Green: Countdown (1999), the 2000s sourcebook, by John Tynes, Dennis Detwiller and Adam Scott Glancy, ISBN 1-887797-12-2.
- Delta Green Eyes Only Volume 1: Machinations of the Mi-go ISBN 1-887797-13-0.
- Delta Green Eyes Only Volume 2: The Fate.
- Delta Green Eyes Only Volume 3: Project Rainbow ISBN 1-887797-21-1.
- Delta Green (May 2007), the basic sourcebook with dual BRP/D20 stats; ISBN 1-887797-23-8.
- Delta Green: Eyes Only (November 2007), a compilation of the Eyes Only chapbooks with additional material; ISBN 1-887797-27-0.
- Delta Green: Targets of Opportunity (2010), a sourcebook detailing five new evils, by Warren Banks, Dennis Detwiller, Adam Scott Glancy, Kenneth Hite, Shane Ivey, and Greg Stolze, illustrated by Todd Shearer; ISBN 1-887797-31-9.

=== Arc Dream Publishing sourcebooks ===
- Delta Green: Need to Know with Handler's Screen (April 27, 2016, PDF; August 1, 2016, Print), by Shane Ivey and Bret Kramer; ISBN 978-1940410203
- Delta Green: Agent's Handbook (Hardback) (April 27, 2016, PDF; August 1, 2016, Print), players-only core rulebook; ISBN 1-940410-21-5
- Delta Green: Handler's Guide (Hardback) (October 31, 2017, PDF; July 1, 2018, Print), the Game Master-only book with lore information and enemy statistics; by Dennis Detwiller, Adam Scott Glancy, Kenneth Hite, Shane Ivey, Greg Stolze; ISBN 978-1-940410-28-9
- Delta Green: Delta Green: The Role-Playing Game (Slipcase) (March 9, 2018, PDF; July 23, 2018, Print), by Dennis Detwiller; Adam Scott Glancy; Kenneth Hite; Shane Ivey; Greg Stolze (Author); ISBN 978-1940410326
- Delta Green: Need to Know (Quickstart Rulebook Only) (November 6, 2018), by Shane Ivey and Bret Kramer; ISBN 978-1729257623
- Delta Green: The Complex (Paperback) (April 18, 2019, PDF; POD); by Christopher Gunning; ISBN 978-1-940410-41-8
- Delta Green: The Labyrinth (Hardback) (November 12, 2019, PDF), sourcebook with new enemy groups and allies; by John Scott Tynes; ISBN 978-1940410487
- Delta Green: STATIC Protocol (Paperback) (February 24, 2021, PDF; POD), supplement for Impossible Landscapes; by Dennis Detwiller
- Delta Green: ARCHINT (Paperback) (July 26, 2021, PDF; POD), collection of artifacts; by Dennis Detwiller, Caleb Stokes; ISBN 978-1-940410-58-6
- Delta Green: The Conspiracy (Hardback) (October 26, 2022, PDF), revised sourcebook for running Delta Green in the 1990s; by Dennis Detwiller, Adam Scott Glancy, and John Scott Tynes; ISBN 978-1-940410-61-6

=== Arc Dream Publishing scenarios ===
- Delta Green: The Last Equation (Paperback) (April 4, 2011, PDF; POD), by Dennis Detwiller; ISBN 978-1940410333
- Delta Green: Kali Ghati (Paperback) (April 27, 2016, PDF; POD), scenario by Shane Ivey; ISBN 978-1-940410-24-1
- Delta Green: Lover in the Ice (May 27, 2016, PDF), scenario by Caleb Stokes
- Delta Green: The Star Chamber (Paperback) (July 25, 2016, PDF; POD), scenario by Greg Stolze; ISBN 978-1-940410-26-5
- Delta Green: Observer Effect (Paperback) (December 13, 2016, PDF; POD); ISBN 978-1-940410-25-8
- Delta Green: Extremophilia (Paperback) (September 21, 2017, PDF, POD), by Shane Ivey; ISBN 978-1-940410-27-2
- Delta Green: Music From a Darkened Room (Paperback) (October 18, 2017, PDF; POD), by Shane Ivey; ISBN 978-1-940410-29-6
- Delta Green: Viscid (Paperback) (January 2, 2018, PDF; POD), by Dennis Detwiller; ISBN 978-1940410302
- Delta Green: A Night at the Opera (Hardback) (March 8, 2018, PDF; November 30, 2018, Print), by Dennis Detwiller, Shane Ivey, Greg Stolze; ISBN 978-1940410319
- Delta Green: Sweetness (Paperback) (March 27, 2018, PDF; POD), by Dennis Detwiller; ISBN 978-1940410388
- Delta Green: Control Group (Hardback) (April 24, 2019, PDF; August 19, 2019, Print), A collection of original adventures to introduce players to Delta Green; by Shane Ivey, Greg Stolze; ISBN 978-1-940410-44-9
- Delta Green: A Victim of the Art (Paperback) (June 11, 2019, PDF; POD), by Dennis Detwiller; ISBN 978-1940410388
- Delta Green: Black Sites (Hardback) (April 2020 PDF and Print), by Dennis Detwiller, Adam Scott Glancy, Shane Ivey, Caleb Stokes; ISBN 9781940410494;
- Delta Green: Impossible Landscapes (Hardback) (January 21, 2020, PDF); by Dennis Detwiller; ISBN 978-1940410548
- Delta Green: PX Poker Night (Paperback) (August 10, 2020, PDF; POD), by Dennis Detwiller, Adam Scott Glancy; ISBN 978-1-940410-53-1
- Delta Green: Hourglass (Paperback) (February 4, 2021, PDF; POD), by Shane Ivey; ISBN 978-1-940410-50-0
- Delta Green: Jack Frost (Paperback) (September 3, 2021, PDF; POD), by Shane Ivey; ISBN 978-1-940410-52-4
- Delta Green: Iconoclasts (Paperback) (April 26, 2022, PDF; POD), by Adam Scott Glancy; ISBN 978-1-940410-43-2
- Delta Green: Convergence (Paperback) (March 1, 2023, PDF; POD), by John Scott Tynes; ISBN 978-1-940410-63-0
- Delta Green: From the Dust (Paperback) (April 24, 2023, PDF; POD), by Dennis Detwiller; ISBN 978-1-940410-64-7
- Delta Green: Presence (Paperback) (May 30, 2023, PDF; POD), by Shane Ivey; ISBN 978-1-940410-68-5
- Delta Green: God's Teeth (Hardcover) (October 13, 2023, PDF), by Caleb Stokes; ISBN 978-1-940410-60-9
- Delta Green: Puppet Shows & Shadow Plays (Paperback) (December 11, 2023, PDF; POD), by Adam Scott Glancy; ISBN 978-1-940410-72-2
- Delta Green: Meridian (Paperback) (April 2, 2024, PDF; POD), by Shane Ivey; ISBN 978-1-940410-74-6
- Delta Green: Dead Letter (Paperback) (June 3, 2024, PDF; POD), by Adam Scott Glancy; ISBN 978-1-940410-75-3
- Delta Green: The Good Life (Paperback) (June 24, 2024, PDF; POD), by John Scott Tynes; ISBN 978-1-940410-76-0
- Delta Green: Dead Drops (Hardback) (July 11, 2024, PDF), by Dennis Detwiller, Shane Ivey; ISBN 978-1-940410-81-4
- Delta Green: God's Eye (Paperback) (July 20, 2024, PDF; POD), by Caleb Stokes; ISBN 978-1-940410-77-7
- Delta Green: God's Breath (Paperback) (September 10, 2024, PDF; POD), by Caleb Stokes; ISBN 978-1-940410-78-4

=== The Fall of Delta Green, by Pelgrane Press ===
- The Fall of Delta Green (February 2018); ISBN 978-1-912324-00-2
- The Borellus Connection (September 2024); ISBN 978-1-912324-31-6

=== Additional material by the original creators ===
Scenarios by Dennis Detwiller, published online and (since Sep 2014) through Patreon:

- Music from a Darkened Room (2005)
- The Last Equation (2010)
- Future/Perfect (parts 1 through 4 as of 2012)
- Viscid (January 31, 2016)
- Sweetness (February 28, 2016)

Adam Scott Glancy wrote a regular column titled "Directives from A-Cell" in the first six issues of Worlds of Cthulhu magazine. The column was then transferred to The Unspeakable Oath from Arc Dream Publishing, starting with issue 20. The latter magazine has featured a lot of Delta Green-related articles since 1993.

=== Other publishers ===
Fantasy Flight Games Live Action RPG supplements:

- Cthulhu Live: Shades of Gray (2000); ISBN 1-887911-92-8.
- Cthulhu Live: Delta Green (2000); ISBN 1-887911-43-X.

Ronin Arts:

- Dubious Shards by Kenneth Hite (2006).

Pyramid Magazine:

- Green Box (8/21/02 & 10/9/02), with d20 stats.
- Jack Frost by Shane Ivey (12/24/99 & 12/31/99), a scenario.

Dungeon Magazine:

- PX Poker Night (issue 96), scenario with d20 stats.

Shadis:

- Dia de Los Muertos, issue 52.

=== Fiction ===
- Delta Green: Alien Intelligence (Tynes Cowan Corp, March 1998), anthology, ISBN 1-887797-09-2.
- Delta Green: The Rules of Engagement (Tynes Cowan Corp, 2000), novel by John Tynes, ISBN 1-887797-16-5.
- Delta Green: Dark Theatres (Armitage House, 2001), anthology, ISBN 1-887797-17-3.
- Delta Green: Denied to the Enemy (Tynes Cowan Corp, distributed by Impressions, 2003), novel by Dennis Detwiller, ISBN 1-887797-24-6.
  - Ebook edition (Arc Dream Publishing, 2011), ISBN 978-0-9832313-0-1.
- Delta Green: Through a Glass, Darkly ebook edition (Arc Dream Publishing, 2011), novel by Dennis Detwiller, ISBN 978-0-9832313-6-3.
- Delta Green: Strange Authorities (Arc Dream Publishing, 2012), collection of previously published fiction by John Tynes, ISBN 978-0-9853175-0-8.
- Delta Green: Tales from Failed Anatomies (Arc Dream Publishing, 2014), collection of short stories by Dennis Detwiller. ISBN 978-1-940410-08-1 (hardback edition).
  - Paperback edition, ISBN 978-1-940410-07-4.
  - Ebook edition, ISBN 978-1-940410-09-8.
- Delta Green: Extraordinary Renditions (Arc Dream Publishing, 2015), anthology.
- Delta Green: The Way It Went Down (Arc Dream Publishing, 2018), collection of short stories by Dennis Detwiller. ISBN 978-1-940410-36-4 (hardback edition)
  - Paperback edition, ISBN 978-1-940410-35-7
  - Ebook edition, ISBN 978-1-940410-34-0
- Delta Green: The Way It Went Down, Vol. 2 (Arc Dream Publishing, 2023), collection of short stories by Dennis Detwiller. ISBN 978-1-940410-66-1 (paperback edition)
  - Ebook edition, ISBN 978-1940410654

== Reception ==
In the March 1997 edition of the British game magazine Arcane (Issue 17), Andy Butcher said "Right from the first page of the book, it's obvious that Delta Green is something really special." Butcher complimented the book for "a wealth of rich detail, intricate plotting, and great imagination. The result is truly inspiring." He concluded by giving the book at excellent rating of 9 out of 10, saying, "One of the biggest, most detailed, best conceived and inspiring sourcebooks ever released for any game system. An absolute must for any Call of Cthulhu referee considering a modern-day campaign, and highly recommended even if you're not."

In the July 1998 edition of Dragon (Issue 249), Ray Winninger called Delta Green "one of the richest, most detailed, and most complete sourcebooks ever published." Winninger found that this book "successfully melds Lovecraft's eerie mythos with modern UFO and conspiracy folklore to produce a compelling hybrid setting all its own." Winninger gave the book a perfect rating of 6 out of 6, concluding, "The book contains all the material any Keeper could possibly expect, all of it first rate: the illustrations are excellent and helpful, the included adventures are top-notch, and the price is remarkably reasonable [...] Products like this come along only very rarely. For Call of Cthulhu fans, Delta Green is a must buy. For everybody else, it's still probably worth a look."

In Issue 3 of the French game magazine Backstab, Stéphane Bura wrote, "Seldom has a role-playing product inspired in me such a sense of despair and helplessness in the face of the threat it offered." He concluded by giving the book a perfect rating of 10 out of 10, saying, "Even if you wouldn't normally play a contemporary role-playing game, buy this supplement anyway. This is the must-see product that will set the bar for excellence for a few years to come."

In his 2023 book Monsters, Aliens, and Holes in the Ground, RPG historian Stu Horvath noted, "A rich narrative web increases the horror for the players, even if the players don't experience the full story. There is a thrill to combing through the histories and timelines, making connections, and developing theories." Horvath concluded, "Delta Green more often pits players against other humans, rather than monsters, which, in turn, places an increased value on examining the human toll of the missions ... It doesn't always ring true, but it represents a vast improvement over sanity systems that feature pulp-inspired caricatures of mental health."

In retrospective coverage, Forbes contributor Rob Wieland described Delta Green as "one of the most critically acclaimed books in the hobby." He wrote that the original 1997 sourcebook became a bestseller, won awards, and was "beloved by players and Keepers alike." and made a positive assesment of the setting's enduring appeal, praising its combination of Lovecraftian horror, government conspiracy, and modern themes. Reviewing the 2023 reissue Delta Green: The Conspiracy, Wieland called the original an "iconic supplement" and a "critical and commercial success," praising its blend of government conspiracy and Lovecraftian horror for placing players "in the center of a government conspiracy tasked with a seemingly impossible mission" while adding "several layers of drama." He also highlighted that the game's mechanics, which emphasize agents' personal relationships and the psychological cost of their work, reinforced its themes and helped distinguish it from traditional Call of Cthulhu campaigns.

== Awards ==
=== Origins Awards ===
- At the 1998 Origins Awards, Delta Green won "Best Roleplaying Supplement of 1997".
- At the 2000 Origins Awards, the setting won two awards:
  - Best Game-Related Novel of 1999 for Delta Green: The Rules of Engagement
  - Best Roleplaying Supplement of 1999 for Delta Green: Countdown

=== ENnie Awards ===
- At the 2010 ENnie Awards, Delta Green: Targets of Opportunity was awarded two silvers in the categories "Best Adventure" and "Best Writing."
- At the 2016 awards:
  - Delta Green: Agent’s Handbook was awarded a silver in "Best Supplement"
  - Delta Green: Need to Know won gold in "Best Free Game".
- At the 2018 awards:
  - Delta Green: The Role-Playing Game won two golds in "Best Rules" and "Best Production Values", and the silver in "Best Game" and "Product of the Year"
  - Delta Green: A Night at the Opera won the gold in "Best Electronic Book" and the silver in "Best Adventure".
- At the 2019 awards, The Fall of Delta Green won the gold in "Best Setting."
- At the 2020 awards, Delta Green: The Labyrinth won the gold in "Best Supplement."
- At the 2022 awards, Delta Green: Impossible Landscapes won the gold in "Best Layout and Design."
- At the 2024 awards, Delta Green: God’s Teeth won the gold in "Best Adventure – Long Form."

== Other reviews ==
- Valkyrie #15 (1997)
- Shadis #35 (1997)
- Pyramid #25 (May/June 1997)
- Backstab #15
- SF Site
- Pyramid

== See also ==
The following novels and short stories share similar backgrounds to Delta Green:

- The Atrocity Archives and its sequels by Charles Stross
- The Spiraling Worm by David Conyers and John Sunseri
- Declare by Tim Powers
- Tinfoil Trilogy by Caitlin R. Kiernan

Other role-playing games with similar premise:

- Bureau 13
- Conspiracy X
- Hunter: The Vigil
- Night's Black Agents
