= Dennis Detwiller =

Canadian game designer

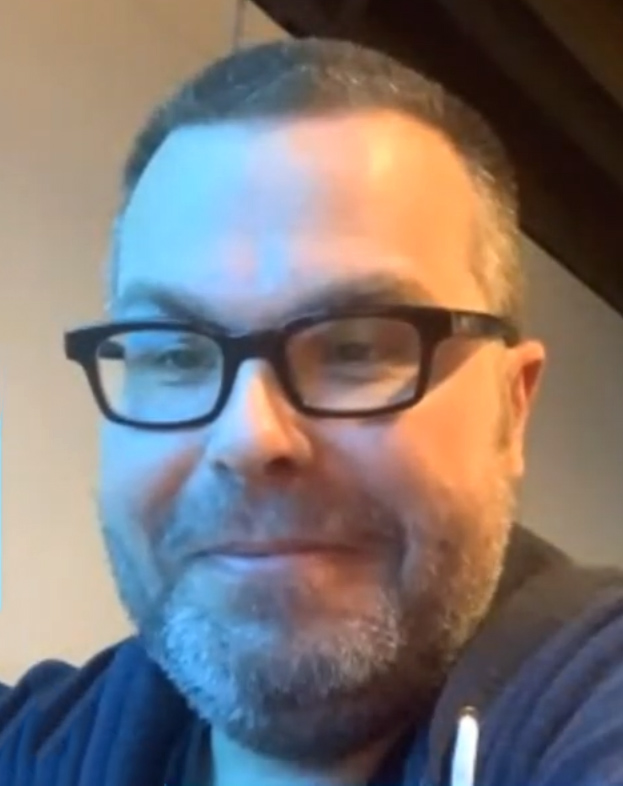
- Detwiller interviewed in 2020
- Born: July 12, 1972 (age 54); New York City, U.S.
- Known for: Role-playing games Video games
- Awards: Multiple Origins Awards, Diamond Award for Prototype on Gamertrailers.com
- Website: detwillerdesign.com

Dennis Detwiller (born July 12, 1972) is a Canadian video game designer for Hothead Games and a role-playing game designer, writer, and artist.

== Career ==
Dennis Detwiller started volunteering at Pagan Publishing after seeing an issue of The Unspeakable Oath magazine in 1991 and talking to John Scott Tynes. Tynes moved the company to Seattle in the mid-1990s, and Detwiller agreed to move there as well. Detwiller worked at Pagan as art director where he co-created the Origins Award-winning game Delta Green in 1997 with Tynes and Adam Scott Glancy; Detwiller wrote a series of three chapbooks (1998–2000), and with Tynes and Glancy he expanded the setting in 1999 with Delta Green: Countdown. Detwiller illustrated The Hills Rise Wild!, which also won an Origins Award.

Detwiller and Greg Stolze prepared their game Godlike which was intended to be published by Pagan Publishing, but as publication by Pagan was slowing down, Detwiller instead took it to his friends Hsin Chen and Aron Anderson, who created the company Hawthorn Hobgoblynn Press (later known as EOS Press) in 2001 to publish the game. After the release of Godlike in 2002 Detwiller founded Arc Dream Publishing with Shane Ivey. Detwiller and Ivey formed Arc Dream Publishing to produce supplements for Godlike, and in 2003 Arc Dream acquired the licensing from Stolze to use his One-Roll Engine (ORE) dice system for Godlike. He has since worked on Wild Talents, a follow-up to Godlike, and the free horror game NEMESIS. Detwiller and Ivey wrote Delta Green: Targets of Opportunity (2010) and also brought back The Unspeakable Oath in 2010. Following a successful kickstarter campaign, Arc Dream publishing announced a new Delta Green game to be released in 2016.

In 2002, he left Seattle for Vancouver to work with Radical Entertainment where he helped develop The Incredible Hulk: Ultimate Destruction, Scarface: The World is Yours and Prototype. In early 2009, he left Radical Entertainment for Hothead Games. In January 2016, he moved to Monte Cook Games as managing editor.

== Works ==
=== Role-playing games ===
- Delta Green (co-creator, with John Tynes and Adam Scott Glancy, 1997)
- Godlike (creator, writer, and artist, 2001)
- Wild Talents (creator, writer, and artist, 2006)
- Nemesis (creator, 2006)
- Unmasked (writer and designer, 2017)

=== Video games ===
- The Incredible Hulk: Ultimate Destruction
- Scarface: The World is Yours
- Prototype
- DeathSpank
- Necropolis

=== Fiction ===
- Delta Green: Denied to the Enemy (2003)
- Delta Green: Through a Glass, Darkly (2011)
- Delta Green: Tales from Failed Anatomies (2014)
