= Godlike (role-playing game) =

Tabletop superhero role-playing game by Dennis Detwiller and Greg Stolze

Superhero Roleplaying in a World on Fire, 1936-1946
- Godlike 1st edition cover
- Designers: Dennis Detwiller and Greg Stolze
- Publishers: Arc Dream Publishing
- Publication: December 2001
- Genres: Superhero, Alternate History
- Systems: One-Roll Engine, d20 System

Godlike: Superhero Roleplaying in a World on Fire, 1936-1946 is an alternate history World War II era superhero role-playing game, created by Dennis Detwiller and Greg Stolze. Godlike was originally produced by Dennis Detwiller and John Scott Tynes of Pagan Publishing (though it was not actually a Pagan publication), and published by Hawthorn Hobgoblynn Press. It is currently published by Arc Dream Publishing. Godlike is the first game released using the One-Roll Engine (O.R.E.) gaming system, a dice pool system where matched die results determine success.

== Setting ==
Godlike is set in an alternate history version of World War II where people known as Talents have developed unexplained powers. Godlike is a gritty superhero roleplaying game, where wearing spandex and other flashy outfits is a sure way to draw a sniper's bullet that most Talents would not survive. The Godlike core book contains a detailed section reviewing key events of World War II with special attention paid to events that differed due to the Talents involved in the war.

== System ==
While it was not called the One-Roll Engine at time of print, Godlike introduces the dice pool rolling system where matching results on dice are formed into sets to help determine the outcome of an action in how successfully and swiftly the action is performed. The name One-Roll comes from the nature that one roll of the dice determines the initiative, success, location and damage of an action.

Also included in the core book are rules for playing Godlike with an OGL d20 System.

== Supplements ==
Supplements for the Godlike system include:

- Will To Power
- Intelligence Bulletin No. 2
- Intelligence Bulletin No. 3
- Donar's Hammer
- Saipan
- Black Devils Brigade
- The Courtyard of Hell

== See also ==
- Wild Talents

== Reviews ==
- Pyramid
- Pyramid
- InQuest Gamer #81
- InQuest Gamer #88, August 2002
- Backstab #39
- Syfy
