= Adam Scott Glancy =

Writer and game designer

Adam Scott Glancy is an author and game designer known for co-developing Delta Green, as well as penning game settings, source books, short fiction, and essays related to the H.P. Lovecraft's Cthulhu Mythos.

== Career ==
Adam Scott Glancy, with John Scott Tynes and Dennis Detwiller, developed the Delta Green (1996) supplement to Call of Cthulhu for Pagan Publishing; they grew their setting further in 1999 with Delta Green: Countdown. On January 1, 2001, Tynes advised his partners that he was leaving the roleplaying industry, and Glancy became the president of Pagan Publishing. Eos Press published a d20 version of Delta Green (2007) with Glancy, and were able to use the Pagan Publishing trademark.
