= Faeries (Ars Magica) =

Role-playing game supplement

Cover art of White Wolf edition, 1991

Faeries is a supplement for the fantasy role-playing game Ars Magica first published by White Wolf Publishing in 1991, and by Wizards of the Coast in 1995.

== Contents ==
Faeries is a sourcebook which presents stories about faeries using the point of view of other characters, to provide insight into the way that faeries think. It also includes a bestiary of faeries from around the world, rules on creating a faerie character, and four short adventures.

The first version was a 144-page softcover written by John Snead, Sarah Link, Jonathan Tweet, Lisa Stevens, and Mark Rein-Hagen, and published by White Wolf in 1991 for the second edition of Ars Magica.

After Wizards of the Coast (WotC) bought the rights to Ars Magica from White Wolf in 1994, the new owners produced a fourth edition of the role-playing game, and a revised version of Faeries in 1995. This revised edition was also a 144-page softcover, written by John Snead and Sarah Link, with interior art by Amy Weber, Anson Madocks, Bryon Wackwitz, Chris Rush, Doug Shuler, Eric David Anderson, Jeff Menges, John T. Snyder, John Ueland, Julie Baroh, Mark Tedin, Rosemary Roach, and Susan Van Camp, and cover art by David O. Miller and Maria Cabardo.

== Reception ==
Matthew Gabbert reviewed Faeries in White Wolf #28 (Aug./Sept., 1991), rating it a 4 out of 5 and stated that "The fairies of Mythic Europe aren't just a bunch of 'tinkerbells' flitting from tree to tree - they are a force to be reckoned with. As influential in their own way as the holy and infernal powers, the faeries can even rival (or threaten) the great magi of the Order of Hermes. If you're looking for something to add a little more magic to your Saga, Faeries should do just the trick."

In the December 1995 edition of Arcane magazine (Issue 1), Andrew Rilstone reviewed the second edition published by WotC and commented that "It would be a shame if the end result of this evocative tome was just new characters with special powers and funny eyes." He gave the book an average rating of 7 out of 10 overall.

In the February 1996 edition of Dragon (Issue #226), Rick Swan thought that the WotC version "improves on the original in every way" and told readers "If you own Version One, dump it." Swan admitted the narrative style of the book, which he found "charming, a welcome respite from the humdrum approach employed in most RPG supplements", would not be to everyone's taste. "You might find this tedious if all you want are hard facts to use in a role-playing adventure." Swan found the rules section "less successful" than the story-telling, saying "too many of the ideas are sabotaged by a lack of development." He concluded by giving the book an average rating of 4 out of 6, saying, "I’m not crazy about fiction in role-playing supplements; most game designers are about as good at writing fiction as rock musicians are at composing symphonies. But here, it’s engaging and cute. And if you flinched at the word 'cute,' consider spending your money elsewhere."
