= The Order of Hermes =

Role-playing game supplement

Cover art by Richard Thomas, 1990

The Order of Hermes is a supplement published by Lion Rampant in 1990 for the fantasy role-playing game Ars Magica.

== Contents ==
The Order of Hermes is a supplement which details The Order of Hermes, the society in Ars Magica to which all wizards belong. The book describes in detail the thirteen Houses of the Order, each with it own magical specialities and politics.

== Publication history ==
Lion Rampant published Ars Magica in 1987, and several supplements and adventures followed. The Order of Hermes was published in 1990, a 126-page softcover book written by Jonathan Tweet, with illustrations by Josh Timbrook, and cover art by Richard Thomas.

== Reception ==
In the June 1991 edition of Dragon (Issue #170), Ken Rolston was impressed by the gritty and non-heroic nature of the Order, commenting, "The history is full of violence, injustice, betrayal, corruption, vengeance, and all the great themes that drive the darker, less-heroic sides of epic fantasy." He concluded with a strong recommendation for both role-players as well as non-gaming readers, saying, "The variety and charm of magicks implied in the background is imaginative and inspiring. I recommend this in part for its utility, since it would make an excellent model for a wizards society — good or evil — in a fantasy campaign, but also because it is such a good read and so full of interesting fantasy story and character hooks."

In the 2014 book Designers & Dragons: The '90s, game historian Shannon Appelcline commented that compared to previous Ars Magica releases Bats of Mercille and The Stormrider, "The Order of Hermes (1989) was a much more notable product. It developed the idea of 12 different wizardly organizations that players could join in Ars Magica. The new book gave players real handles for their characters and story seeds to carry them into the future; the desires of a House of Hermes could be used as plot hooks throughout a campaign." Appelcline added that "The Order of Hermes has been repeatedly copied, first by Rein•Hagen himself at White Wolf, and later by pretty much the whole industry. [Chaosium's RuneQuest supplement] Cults of Prax might have been the true origin of the modern splatbooks that filled gaming store shelves in the '00s and '10s, but The Order of Hermes is the missing link."

In the December 1990 – January 1991 issue of White Wolf, Matthew Gabbert gave the product a positive review. He stated that "The Order of Hermes is the best supplement yet for Ars Magica and is almost a necessity for Storyguides and players alike. It opens up vast new regions for character and Saga development. Even if you don't play Ars Magica (and this supplement is a strong case for starting), the Order would be a fine addition to virtually any fantasy world. Don't leave your game store without it." Gabbert rated the supplement a 5 out of 5 possible points.
