= The Sorcerer's Slave =

Tabletop role-playing game adventure

The Sorcerer's Slave is an adventure released under license by Atlas Games in 1987 for the fantasy role-playing game Ars Magica published by Lion Rampant.

== Contents ==
A mysterious message arrives at the home of the player characters in medieval France. Apparently a young prodigy named Andros who ran away has been captured and enslaved by a conjurer who lives near the Black Sea. The conjurer and his household will be travelling to Constantinople, giving the player characters an opportunity to rescue Andros. From Constantinople, the adventure moves into the Caucasus Mountains.

== Publication history ==
Lion Rampant Games published the fantasy role-playing game Ars Magica in 1987. In the 2014 book Designers & Dragons: The '90s, game historian Shannon Appelcline noted that "Atlas Games produced five different licensed adventure books for the Ars Magica RPG." The Sorcerer's Slave was one of these publications, a 32-page softcover book written by Thomas Kane, with cartography by John Nephew and interior art by John Podeszwa, and published by Atlas in 1987.

== Reception ==
Matthew Gabbert reviewed the product in the February–March 1991 issue of White Wolf. He gave it an overall positive review, noting that its brevity caused a lack of useful coverage in some areas but stated that "if you're looking for something exotic for your troupe and you don't mind filling in a few gaps, The Sorcerer's Slave will serve you well." He rated it at 3 out of a possible 5 points.

== Reviews ==
- Alarums & Excursions Issue 187 (March 1991, p.62)
