= The Broken Covenant of Calebais =

Tabletop role-playing game adventure

The Broken Covenant of Calebais is an adventure published by Lion Rampant in 1988 for the fantasy role-playing game Ars Magica.

== Contents ==
The Broken Covenant of Calebais is an adventure which takes place fifty years after a group (a covenant) of wizards, along with their servants and guards, mysteriously sealed themselves off from the world with magical wards. Now a clue has found about how to penetrate the wards, and the players' characters have been chosen to investigate.

== Publication history ==
The Broken Covenant of Calebais was the first adventure published for Ars Magica, and was released as a 44-page softcover book designed by Jonathan Tweet and Mark Rein-Hagen.

== Reception ==
Stewart Wieck reviewed The Broken Covenant of Calebais in White Wolf #13 (December 1988) and stated that "As a whole, the adventure is very well done and well conceived. It includes one of the few playable (in game terms) riddles I have come across in my gaming. I was a bit disappointed to see the first 'Ars Magica' adventure revolve around an expedition into a 'dungeon', no matter how logical the 'dungeon'."

In the July–August 1989 edition of Space Gamer (Vol. II No. 1), John Nephew liked the adventure, commenting, "I heartily recommend this adventure to all FRP gamers, whatever system you may use. Some technical sides may be difficult to convert, but the background and many fascinating personalities make it worth the effort. The numerous innovations scattered throughout the text should make your gaming grow and improve even if you never run the adventure."

In the August 1989 edition of Games International (Issue #8), Dave Morris, a self-admitted fan of Ars Magica, found himself "slightly disappointed" by this adventure. Morris found the treasure boring, the dungeon feel overmapped, and the final encounter "jarringly stage-managed." In addition, he called the illustrations "remarkably bland, with the exception of a couple of medieval engravings." He concluded by giving this adventure a rating of 4 out of 5, saying, "Overall a good story but with only a few flashes of real brilliance that characterised Ars Magica. Possibly it makes too many self-conscious concessions to being 'commercial'."

In the October 1989 edition of Dragon (Issue #150), Ken Rolston was very pleased with the adventure, which he called "a persuasive example of how the Ars Magica system can produce a first-class fantasy adventure with a spotlight on wizards and sorcery." Rolston thought the adventure to be "earnest but imaginative, challenging, mysterious fun." He called the obligatory introductory encounter "a charming well-paced warm-up to the rest of the adventure," and thought the minor antagonists were "adorable, bush league, and numerous, and are provided with a complete micro-culture and survival rationale." He did find "the graphics are weak, the wrap-up is a bit abrupt, and the writing, materials, maps, and organization are somewhat less than polished." But Rolston concluded, "The Broken Covenant pleased me enormously; my recommendation is unreserved... For original tone and flavor, general effect, and ambitious aspiration, it’s a thoroughly satisfying adventure."
