= Black Death (disambiguation) =

The Black Death was the deadliest pandemic recorded in human history.

Black Death may also refer to:

== Arts and entertainment ==
- Black Death (film), a 2010 British horror film directed by Christopher Smith
- The Black Death (novel), a 1992 novel by Basil Copper
- The Black Death, a 1977 novel by Gwyneth Cravens
  - Quiet Killer or Black Death, a 1992 Canadian television film of the novel
- The Black Death (video game), a Commodore 64 game
- Black Death (Ars Magica), a 1991 adventure for the role-playing game Ars Magica
- Black Death (game), a 1993 board game

=== Music ===
- Black Death (American band), an American heavy metal band
  - Black Death (album), their debut album
- "Black Death" (song), a hard rock song by Arrogance
- Darkthrone, a Norwegian band originally named Black Death
- "The Black Death", a song from the 2015 musical Something Rotten!
- "The Black Death", an album by When (band)

== Other uses ==
- Black Death Group, an apparent criminal organization on the dark web
- African buffalo, nicknamed "The Black Death" reflecting the dangerousness of the species
- Brennivín, an Icelandic schnapps sometimes called Black Death
- Russian Naval Infantry, nicknamed "Black Death" in reference to its combat effectiveness and black uniforms
- Joseph Henry Blackburne (1841–1924), British chess player
- Henry Johnson (World War I soldier) (1892–1929), African-American soldier in World War I

== See also ==
- Blackened death metal, an extreme metal music genre
