= Saga Pack =

Tabletop role-playing game supplement

Left-hand panel of gamemaster's screen, art by Michael Weaver, 1990

Saga Pack is a supplement published by Lion Rampant in 1990 for the fantasy role-playing game Ars Magica.

== Contents ==
Saga Pack is a set of gamemaster's aids for the second edition of Ars Magica, including a gamemaster's screen, and 24 loose-leaf pages that outline 16 pregenerated characters, guidelines for role-playing, and also provides more information about the Code of Hermes.

The three-panel gamemaster's screen has tables of information on the gamemaster's side that include a summary of melee and ranged weapons and their effects, armor, spellcasting penalties and distractions, combat maneuvers and phases, movement factors, interactions with various Powers, difficulty factors, and healing. A continuous piece of artwork by Michael Weaver covers all three panels on the player's side.

Eight pages of loose-leaf sheets are designed to be cut on half, with pregenerated "grogs" (fighters) detailed on the front and back of each page. The remaining eight double-sided sheets cover the limits of Hermetic magic, the typical life of a grog, the Code of Hermes, the history of the Order of Hermes, and the art of gamemastering and storytelling.

== Publication history ==
Saga Pack was written by Mark Rein-Hagen and Lisa Stevens, with artwork by Michael Weaver, and was published by Lion Rampant in 1990 as a three-panel cardstock screen with 24 loose-leaf sheets.

== Reception ==
In the February–March 1990 edition of Games International (Issue 13), Dave Morris was initially disappointed in the brevity of this supplement, saying "Ars Shorta might have been a better title, since this is actually a fairly thin supplement for the Ars Magic rolegame." However, he then found the quality of the product was high, saying the individual topics covered "are good articles because they are immensely inspirational."

Stewart Wieck reviewed Saga Pack in White Wolf #19 (Feb./March, 1990), rating it a 4 out of 5 and stated that "Saga Pack includes eight pages of articles concerning various aspects of Ars Magica. Some have appeared elsewhere [...] but The Life of a Grog, the Limits of Magic, Decisions: How to be a Better Storyguide, and the others are all useful."

In the June 1991 edition of Dragon (Issue #170), Ken Rolston had a poor first impression of this supplement, saying, "The Storyguide’s screen and supplement cover features undistinguished art, and the Storyguide’s screen itself is of doubtful utility." Rolston noted that much of the essay-type material included had originally been published in other sources. However, he did like the pregenerated characters, noting that "The story hooks built into the character backgrounds are lovely: a simpleton with a gift for speech with faerie creatures; a warrior with a death wish; a man with a pleasant facile exterior, a glib friendliness, and a dark, compulsive, violent streak." Rolston pointed out that if the gamemaster did not use pregenerated characters, these would be of little use. He concluded that "Saga Pack is generally disappointing in presentation and content, of possible value to an Ars Magica gaming group, and of only modest interest to browsers."
