= Tales of the Dark Ages =

Role-playing game supplement

Tales of the Dark Ages is a collection of adventures published under license by Atlas Games in 1990 for Lion Rampant's fantasy role-playing game Ars Magica.

Cover art by Tara Kinnunen, 1990

== Contents ==
Tales of the Dark Ages is a set of four adventures for use with Ars Magica:

1. "Tongue of Vipers" by Thomas M. Kane: Lady Claire is accused of attempting to poison her husband, the Viscount von Orstadt. The player characters believe she has been framed, but must prove it before she is executed.
2. "The Inheritance" by James P. Buchanan: A companion of the player characters has inherited a small holding that has an ancient Roman aqueduct. Getting it working would alleviate a local drought, but ancient forces oppose this.
3. "Copse of Skulls" by Thomas M. Kane: An apprentice of the player characters is sent on a simple delivery, but he has gone missing and apparently has somehow released something ominous that is terrorizing the local countryside.
4. "The Ghoul of St. Lazare" by John Nephew: An exhumed corpse is discovered floating down the river. Who is the corpse, who exhumed it, and why?

== Publication history ==
Lion Rampant Games published Ars Magica in 1987. In the 2014 book Designers & Dragons: The '90s, game historian Shannon Appelcline noted that "From 1990–1991, Atlas Games produced five different licensed adventure books for the Ars Magica RPG. These included: Tales of the Dark Ages (1990), a set of short adventures and Atlas' first product; Festival of the Damned (1991), a well-loved adventure by Ars Magica designer Jonathan Tweet, who had left the industry just two years earlier; and South of the Sun (1991), an interesting look at Mythic Africa". Tales of the Dark Ages, published under license by Atlas Games in 1990, is a 64-page saddle-stapled softcover book with interior art by Eric Hotz, and cover art by Tara Kinnunen.

== Reception ==
Stewart Wieck reviewed the product in the December 1990 – January 1991 issue of White Wolf. He found flaws in the individual modules, but stated that "Despite these seemingly harsh attacks upon most of the adventures, there is actually little that keeps them from being useful and enjoyable in play. As Storyguide, you might be perturbed with the backgrounds, but the players are likely to have a good time." He rated it overall at 3 of 5 possible points.
