= Whimsy Cards =

Role-playing game supplement

Whimsy Cards is a 1987 role-playing game supplement published by Lion Rampant.

== Contents ==
Whimsy Cards is an aid for role-playing games, a set of event cards which players can use to affect the outcome of a game storyline.

== Publication history ==
Whimsy Cards was written by Jonathan Tweet and Mark Rein-Hagen and published in 1987 by Lion Rampant as 48 flimsy cards and a 4-page rules pamphlet, shrink-wrapped; a second edition published the same year came packed in a bag with stiff cards.

Shannon Appelcline stated that Lion Rampant wanted Ars Magica to be the initial release for the company, "but as Gen Con 20 (1987) approached it became obvious that their premier product would not be ready. Rather than rushing it out (a mistake made all too often by RPG companies), Lion Rampant instead prepared an alternative product for that Gen Con: Whimsy Cards." Appelcline detailed that the storytelling style of design for role-playing games was developing at that time, so for Whimsy Cards, "The idea was simple: print up a deck of 43 cards (plus a few blanks) where each card presented a distinct story element [...] These cards were shuffled and handed out to players at the start of a game; those players would later play a card and describe how it applied to the story. If the gamemaster liked the results, he incorporated the description into the story, otherwise he vetoed it."

== Reception ==
Stewart Wieck reviewed the product in the December 1986 to January 1987 issue of White Wolf. He provided a positive review, stating they are "wonderful role-playing devices".

== Reviews ==
- Dragon #129 (January 1988)

== See also ==
- Storypaths
