= The Stormrider =

Tabletop role-playing game adventure

- Publisher: Lion Rampant
- Publication date: 1989

The Stormrider is an adventure published by Lion Rampant in 1989 for the fantasy role-playing game Ars Magica.

== Contents ==
The Stormrider is a scenario designed to introduce new players and gamemasters to Ars Magica. The adventure, contained in 16 pages, is designed to be completed in a single session. A further 24 pages of front-and-back half-page reference cards provide all the information needed to play the game, including staging hints for the gamemaster. The plot requires the player characters to investigate the destructive force known as the Stormrider.

The Stormrider Jump Start Kit followed the first Lion Rampant supplement, The Bats of Mercille. Stormrider was designed to allow a gamemaster to quickly start gameplay (within 15 minutes) with a group of players.

== Publication history ==
Lion Rampant published the rules for Ars Magica in 1987. Two years later, they released The Stormrider, written by Mark Rein-Hagen with Jonathan Tweet, with illustrations by Eric Hotz, and cover art by Doug Schuler.

== Reception ==
In the February–March 1990 edition of Games International (Issue 13), Paul Mason noted that "the scenario works best of you use the pregenerated characters." He called the scenario "fairly sophisticated in that it uses a rift within the player characters in a creative manner." He concluded that this adventures was "All in all, worth a glance if you fancy a scenario that is story-orientated without being a straitjacket."

In the April 1990 edition of Dragon (Issue #156), Ken Rolston thought the idea of a special introductory look at Ars Magica was "Another original and innovative design idea from Lion Rampant." He also thought the staging hints were "well-implemented", and the adventure featured "skilled storytelling mechanics." For new players, Rolston commented that reading this would be "as instructive as watching a brilliant GM and players at work." He concluded with a strong recommendation, saying, "Even [fantasy role-playing game] players who would never play the Ars Magica game should appreciate the unique presentation and shrewd practical wisdom represented in this pack."

Stewart Wieck reviewed the product in a 1990 issue of White Wolf, rating it at a 4 of 5 points. Matthew Gabbert reviewed the product in a 1991 issue of White Wolf. Gabbert provided a generally positive review, highlighting its usefulness as an introduction to the Ars Magica game system. Overall, he rated it at 3 out of 5 possible points.
