= Nicole Lindroos =

American role-playing game designer

- Occupation: Game designer

Nicole Lindroos is a game designer who has worked primarily on role-playing games.

== Career ==
After twice applying to culinary school, Nicole Lindroos entered the game industry in 1989. Lindroos was one of the Minnesota locals who joined Lion Rampant after the company was started. Lindroos joined White Wolf Publishing when the two companies merged in 1990. Lindroos left White Wolf in 1991 and returned to Minnesota, where she took a job at Atlas Games. Lindroos played a sample copy of Once Upon a Time by James Wallis at Gen Con 24; because of her input the game, was published by Atlas Games in 1993, and remained in print with Atlas through various editions.

Lindroos became a freelancer, writing an adventure for Jonathan Tweet's Everway, and also co-founded the magazine Adventures Unlimited (1995-1996), the first issue of which contained adventures for games she had previously been involved with, including Ars Magica, Vampire: The Masquerade, and Over the Edge. Lindroos and her husband Chris Pramas formed Green Ronin Publishing in 2000. Pramas and Lindroos brought on Hal Mangold as the third member of the Green Ronin team by 2001. Green Ronin was incorporated as an LLC in 2004, with Pramas, Lindroos, and Mangold as the three partners.

Lindroos has volunteered on the board of directors of the Game Manufacturer's Association, the Origins Awards committee, and as the chairman of the Academy of Adventure Gaming Arts and Design.

== Personal life ==
Lindroos lives in Seattle with her husband Chris and daughter Katherine.
