= Melos Caverna =

Melos Caverna is a music album published by Lion Rampant for Ars Magica.

== Description ==
Melos Caverna is a role-playing game aid which consists of an instrumental audio tape that simulates underground ambiance—such as dripping water, animal movements, and echoes—to enhance immersion during gameplay. Designed for use during cavern or subterranean scenes, the GM plays the tape to help evoke the mood and atmosphere for the players.

== Publication history ==
Lion Rampant released Melos Caverna for Gen Con 1989. This was the first tape released by Lion Rampant for role-playing game mood music, and was followed by Bard's Song: Battle Cry in 1990.

== Reception ==
Stewart Wieck reviewed Melos Caverna in White Wolf #19 (Feb./March, 1990), rating it a 4 out of 5 and stated that "I'm not a music expert so cannot comment on the organization of the music itself, but I can say that as a game aid the product succeeds."
