= Houses of Hermes =

Role-playing game supplement

Cover art by Rob Alexander, 1994

Houses of Hermes is a supplement published by Wizards of the Coast in 1994 for the third edition of the fantasy role-playing game Ars Magica.

== Description ==
Houses of Hermes describes the twelve major houses of wizards that together form the Order of Hermes. Each house is dealt with in detail, including its origins and history, and notable personalities. A plot connected to each house is described, and several story hooks are also provided. The book also details new spells and abilities from each house. In addition, the general system of apprenticeship that all the houses use is described.

== Publication history ==
The first edition of Ars Magica was designed by Jonathan Tweet and Mark Rein-Hagen and published in 1987 by Lion Rampant. In 1991, Lion Rampant merged with White Wolf Magazine to form White Wolf Game Studio, which produced a greatly expanded third edition. In 1994, Wizards of the Coast was interested in buying a role-playing game system that could be updated and expanded, and asked designer Jonathan Tweet about Ars Magica. As game historian Shannon Appelcline described it in the 2014 book Designers & Dragons: The '90s, "Wizards consulted with Tweet, and after some thought, he recommended the purchase — which was completed around January 1994."

While Tweet worked on a revised fourth edition of Ars Magica for WotC, he also designed for them Houses of Hermes, a 152-page softcover book with additional contributions by Aron Anderson. Interior illustrations were by Liz Danforth, John T. Snyder, Mark Tedin, Susan Van Camp, and Eric Hotz, and the cover art was by Rob Alexander. And although the cover of Houses of Hermes was subtitled "A Sourcebook for Ars Magica 4th Edition", the game mechanics described in it are for White Wolf's 3rd edition. As Appelcline noted, "Ironically, the game that Tweet co-created would end up being one of Wizard's least supported lines, with just two books: Houses of Hermes (1994) and Lion of the North (1994). Nonetheless, Wizards did make a very permanent mark on the Ars Magica line. They put together a massive, cleaned-up, and codified fourth edition. They just never published it."

== Reception ==
In the September 1995 edition of Dragon (Issue #221), Rick Swan liked the fact that this book "downplays dreary historical summaries in favor of engaging profiles of master magicians [...] The characters make great adversaries and advisors." Swan was also pleased by "the intriguing sidebars", saying that they "supply referees with adventure hooks galore."

== Other reviews ==
- Ars Mag, Issue 5 (Sept 1995, p. 24)
