= Covenants (Ars Magica) =

Covenants is a supplement published by White Wolf Publishing in 1990 for the fantasy role-playing game Ars Magica.

== Publication history ==
Covenants is a 64-page softcover book written by Mark Rein-Hagen and Lisa Stevens, with cover art by Doug Shuler.

== Contents ==
Covenants is a supplement presenting rules and guidelines on how to create a "covenant" (a group or community) of wizards. At the start of an Ars Magica campaign, the characters of all the players at the table are considered to be in the same covenant, so using this book enables the players to act together to design a covenant that best matches the community they all represent.

The life cycle of a covenant (spring, summer, autumn, winter) is discussed, and four sample covenants are described.

== Reception ==
Stewart Wieck reviewed Covenants for White Wolf #20, rating it 4 out of 5 overall, and stated that "These covenants are finely crafted, perhaps displaying detail which is beyond players not intimately familiar with the system, but also showing what the system is capable of creating."

In the June 1990 edition of Games International, the reviewer thought the presentation flashy, but admitted that "Like all the recent Ars Magica material, it feels at first like a cash-in, but closer study is rewarded."

In the June 1991 edition of Dragon (Issue #170), Ken Rolston thought the book was "well written, but of doubtful utility unless you play in an Ars Magica campaign. However, the four sample covenants would make original and entertaining settings for fantasy scenarios in your own campaign."

In the 2014 book Dungeons & Designers: The '80s, Shannon Appelcline commented that "Ars Magica placed a heavy emphasis on the characters' home — the covenant — and even gave rules for mechanically defining it. This would later be developed into a full book, Covenants (1990). Part of the innovation of Ars Magica's covenant system was that it was specifically designed to introduce plot hooks into the game, thereby building recurring storylines from the beginning of play."

== Reviews ==
- Games Review (Volume 2, Issue 10 - Jul 1990)
- Casus Belli #57
- Casus Belli #82
