= The Tempest (Ars Magica) =

Tabletop role-playing game adventure

Cover art by Jeff Menges, 1990

The Tempest is a series of adventures published by Lion Rampant in 1990 for the fantasy role-playing game Ars Magica.

== Description ==
The Tempest is an adventure divided into series of four scenarios involving a druid who survived a magical battle of great power and now seeks revenge against the players' covenant. Although the separate scenarios may seem unrelated at first, gradually the overall storyline is revealed.

== Publication history ==
Ars Magica was first published by Lion Rampant in 1987. The Tempest was published three years later, a 64-page softcover book written by Stewart Wieck, with interior art by Eric Hotz and Charles Dougherty, and cover art by Jeff Menges.

== Reception ==
In the June 1991 edition of Dragon (Issue #170), Ken Rolston was impressed by this book's "fine problem-solving and moral challenges." He concluded with a strong recommendation, saying, "The story and theme are appealing, and the scenarios present many opportunities for rich role-playing and engaging GM performances."

== Reception ==
Matthew Gabbert reviewed the product in the February–March 1991 issue of White Wolf. He spoke positively about its content, artwork, stated that "it was well worth the wait" and is an "easy-to-run and easy-to-adapt package." He rated it overall 4 out of a possible 5 points.
