= Storypaths =

Storypaths was a short-lived series of role-playing supplements published by White Wolf Publishing in 1990.

== Contents ==
Storypaths Deck I: The Path of Horror and Storypaths Deck II: The Path of Intrigue are supplements in which a deck of cards linked by a theme allows players to alter a role-playing game narrative.

== Publication history ==
Shannon Appelcline noted that after the Whimsy Cards from Lion Rampant, "White Wolf released two decks of their new Storypath Cards - The Path of Horror (1990) and The Path of Intrigue (1990) - which did the same thing but offered more evocative detail for a very specific genre of gaming. There were originally supposed to be six more of these 24-card decks - including Danger, Hope, Deception, Discovery, Whimsy and Suspense - but they were never produced."

== Reception ==
Matthew Gabbert reviewed the two decks in White Wolf #27 (June/July, 1991), rating them a 2 out of 5 and stated that "Are Storypaths right for you? That really depends on how you run your games and on what your players like. If they tend to be of the 'Oh, skip the fluff, let's get to the combat and count the loot!' variety, then you should probably pass these by. But if you want to be as adventurous as your characters and try something new and different in roleplaying, have everyone in your group chip in for a deck and give them a try."

== Reviews ==
- Abyss Quarterly #50 (Winter, 1992)
