= Jump-Start Kit =

Jump-Start Kit is a 1988 role-playing game adventure published by Lion Rampant for Ars Magica.

== Contents ==
Jump-Start Kit is a supplement in which the introductory scenario "The Bats of Mercille" is included, along with eight pregenerated player characters and four one-page rules briefings, allowing players to start playing immediately.

== Publication history ==
Jump-Start Kit was written by Mark Rein-Hagen and published by Lion Rampant in 1988 as 25 loose sheets. 100 copies were printed to be sold at the 1988 Origins/GenCon convention.

Shannon Appelcline noted that Lion Rampant had been publishing more innovative products in the late 1980s, and "This included two 'jump-start kits'. The first was Bats of Mercille (1988, 1989) and the second was The Stormrider (1989, 1991). Following the lead of earlier small-press designers at Yaquinto and Pacesetter, [Jonathan] Tweet wanted to offer simpler introductions to roleplaying that gradually eased players into the system. The jump-start kits were his first experiments in this regard, providing lots of handouts that helped players to slowly learn the game (Tweet later refind this concept while working on the third edition of Dungeons & Dragons)."
