= Shields of Power =

Role-playing game

Cover of 4th edition, 2018

Shields of Power is a fantasy role-playing game published by Shield Maiden in 1990.

== Contents ==
Shields of Power is a fantasy role-playing game with a random character generation process for race, class, and family background. In addition to rules for combat and skill resolution, the book contains an introductory adventure, "Gold Quest."

== Publication history ==
Shield Maiden published Shields of Power in 1990, a 94-page book designed by Doug McLelland.scenarios by D.A. Jacobsen. Its authors were Doug McLelland and D.A. Jacobsen.

== Reception ==
Stewart Wieck reviewed the product in the February–March 1991 issue of White Wolf. He provided some positive points such as the combat system and accessibility for new RPG players, but rated it overall at a 2 out of 5 points.
