= The Pact of Pasaquine =

The Pact of Pasaquine is a 1991 role-playing adventure for Ars Magica published by White Wolf Publishing.

== Plot summary ==
The Pact of Pasaquine is an adventure in which the small village of Pasaquine needs the help of the player characters.

== Reception ==
Matthew Gabbert reviewed The Pact of Pasaquine in White Wolf #30 (Feb., 1992), rating it a 4 out of 5 and stated that "The Pact of Pasaquine is fairly well-organized and sparsely, though attractively illustrated. There are descriptions and statistics for all of the more important village folk. It offers a wonderful portrait of a typical village in Mythic Europe, and it is easy to transplant Pasaquine into any ongoing Ars Magica Saga. Even if your adventures are just beginning, Pasaquine could be the perfect point of departure for years of roleplaying fun - just watch out for the wolves!"
