= The Maleficium =

Role-playing supplement for Ars Magic

- Publisher: White Wolf Publishing
- Publication date: 1992
- ISBN: 9781565040342

The Maleficium is a 1992 role-playing supplement for Ars Magica published by White Wolf Publishing.

== Contents ==
The Maleficium is a supplement in which the Infernal is detailed.

== Reception ==
Matthew Gabbert reviewed The Maleficium in White Wolf #37 rating it a 3 out of 5 and stated that "In summary all of the uproar surrounding The Maleficium is much ado about nothing. It is an average supplement that does a good job of dealing with a very difficult subject. Of course, there's always the chance that it could become a collector's item."

== Reviews ==
- Roleplayer Independent (Volume 1, Issue 6–May 1993)
- Wunderwelten (Issue 16 – Apr 1993)
- Magia i Miecz (1995 05)
- Casus Belli #75
