= The Tribunals of Hermes: Iberia =

The Tribunals of Hermes: Iberia is a 1993 role-playing supplement for Ars Magica published by White Wolf Publishing.

== Contents ==
The Tribunals of Hermes: Iberia is a supplement in which Iberia is detailed as part of Mythic Europe.

== Reception ==
Matthew Gabbert reviewed The Tribunals of Hermes: Iberia in White Wolf #38 (1993), rating it a 3 out of 5 and stated that "As the first lengthy foray beyond the confines of Mistridge's Provencal Tribunal, Ibera is a promising introduction to what should prove to be a fascinating and useful series of sourcebooks. Even if your Ars Magica Saga is not set in Spain, what happens there will touch every member of the Order in one way or another."
