= Medieval Bestiary =

1991 role-playing supplement for Ars Magica

Medieval Bestiary is a 1991 role-playing supplement for Ars Magica published by White Wolf Publishing.

== Contents ==
Medieval Bestiary is a supplement in which magical and mundane creatures are described.

== Reception ==
Matthew Gabbert reviewed Medieval Bestiary in White Wolf #33 (Sept./Oct., 1992), rating it a 3 out of 5 and stated that "Overall, I found Medieval Bestiary to be a useful and entertaining supplement. Animals (or monsters) can play an important role in any Ars Magica Saga, for they provide the perfect baseline by which the player characters can measure their own humanity. It is a recommended addition to any Covenant's (or Storyguide's) library."

== Reviews ==
- Backstab #31
