= The Wizard's Grimoire =

Role-playing game supplement

The Wizard's Grimoire is a 1993 role-playing supplement for Ars Magica published by White Wolf Publishing.

== Contents ==
The Wizard's Grimoire is a supplement in which new spells are provided along with more options to personalize Magi characters.

== Reception ==
Matthew Gabbert reviewed The Wizard's Grimoire in White Wolf #45 (July, 1994), rating it a 4 out of 5 and stated that "Typically, every Ars Magica player has at least one Magus character, so I highly recommend this sourcebook. While a tad on the pricy side, you still get a lot for your money."

== Reviews ==
- Dragon #206 (June, 1994)
- Backstab #12
