= Pax Dei (Ars Magica) =

Pax Dei is a 1993 role-playing supplement for Ars Magica published by White Wolf Publishing.

== Contents ==
Pax Dei is a supplement in which the Dominion and Divine are detailed.

== Reception ==
Matthew Gabbert reviewed Pax Dei in White Wolf #37 (July/Aug., 1993), rating it a 4 out of 5 and stated that "A brief outline for a Saga concludes the sourcebook, but it's pretty much an afterthought. It does serve to illustrate how all of the elements presented earlier in Pax Dei can be tied together into a coherent and playable setting. Overall, this is a very good supplement and any Saga would be blessed by its addition."

== Reviews ==
- Magia i Miecz (1995 05)
