= Trial by Fire (Ars Magica) =

Trial by Fire is a 1991 role-playing adventure for Ars Magica published by Atlas Games.

== Contents ==
Trial by Fire is an adventure in which the player characters travel to the port town of De Panne to defend it against the dragon Pan Caudarax.

== Reception ==
Matthew Gabbert reviewed Trial by Fire in White Wolf #30 (Feb., 1992), rating it a 3 out of 5 and stated that "The physical layout is clear and easy-to-follow, although the interior art is a trifle crude. The only place Trial by Fire seems to fall down is in the length-to-cost ratio. At only 32 pages, it's rather like nouvelle cuisine - tasty, but not really filling. Hopefully, future supplements from Atlas Games will allow a return to De Panne (that is, assuming the magi can save it from a fiery fate)."
