= Alarums and Excursions =

Tabletop role-playing game ALA periodical

- Editor: Lee Gold
- Categories: Role-playing games
- Frequency: Monthly
- First issue: #1, June 1975
- Final issue Number: April 2025 #593
- Country: United States
- Based in: Los Angeles
- Language: English
- Website: Alarums and Excursions page

Alarums and Excursions (A&E) was an amateur press association (APA) started in June 1975 by Lee Gold; the final issue, #593, was published in April 2025. It was one of the first publications to focus solely on role-playing games.

== History ==
In 1964, Bruce Pelz of the Los Angeles Science Fiction Society (LASFS) began a weekly amateur press association named APA-L. In 1974, with the publication of Dungeons & Dragons by TSR, Inc., articles and comments about the new roleplaying game began to fill the pages of APA-L, a development to which Pelz objected. Lee Gold took note of this and started a new APA, Alarums and Excursions (the title taken from an Elizabethan drama stage direction that moved soldiers across a stage), to focus entirely on roleplaying games, attracting such material away from APA-L. The first issue appeared in June 1975.

In addition to removing roleplaying games discussion out of APA-L, the initial aim of the publication was to prevent roleplaying games from becoming so divergent that people from different cities could not participate in games together.

The June 2017 issue of Alarums and Excursions was number 500, with a color cover drawn by Lee Moyer and printed by Rob Heinsoo.

== Contents ==
Each issue was a collection of contributions from different authors, often featuring game design discussions, rules variants, write-ups of game sessions, reviews, and comments on others contributions.

Although game reports and social reactions were common parts of many A&E contributions, it also became, over the years, a testing ground for new ideas on the development of the RPG as a genre and an art form. The idea that role-playing games are an art form took strong root in this zine, and left a lasting impression on many of the RPG professionals who contributed. The 1992 role-playing game Over the Edge was inspired by discussions in A&E.

Among the contributors over the years were:

- Terry K. Amthor
- Wilf K. Backhaus
- Scott Bennie
- Greg Costikyan
- Doc Cross
- John M. Ford
- E. Gary Gygax
- Andrew Gelman
- David A. Hargrave
- Rob Heinsoo
- John Eric Holmes
- Wes Ives
- Robin Laws
- Nicole Lindroos
- Samuel Edward Konkin III
- Stephen R. Marsh
- Phil McGregor
- Dave Nalle
- Mark Rein·Hagen
- Ken Rolston
- John T. Sapienza Jr.
- Lawrence M. Schoen
- Edward E. Simbalist
- Jonathan Tweet
- Erick Wujcik
- John Nephew
- Spike Y Jones

== Reception ==
In the February 1976 issue of Strategic Review (Issue 6), Gary Gygax complimented the new APA, calling it "an excellent source of ideas, inspirations and fun." Although Gygax felt some of the contributors were "woefully lacking in background", and the quality of printing varied dramatically from issue to issue, he concluded, "For all of its faults, it is far and away the best D&D 'zine, and well worth reading. See for yourself why it rates a Major Triumph."

In the June 1981 edition of Dragon (Issue #50), Dave Nalle reviewed Alarums and Excursions after its 63rd issue (November 1980), and although he found the writing style "a bit stuffy", with a "tendency for the writers to pat each other on the back", he still called it "the top APA publication... This is a very well run APA and features many of the leading thinkers in fantasy gaming."

== Awards ==
Alarums and Excursions was winner of the Charles Roberts/Origins Award four times:

- 1985: "Best Amateur Adventure Gaming Magazine"
- 1999: "Best Amateur Game Magazine"
- 2000: "Best Amateur Game Periodical"
- 2001: "Best Amateur Game Periodical"

In 2022, Alarums and Excursions was inducted into the Academy of Adventure Gaming Arts & Design Hall of Fame.
