= More Mythic Places =

More Mythic Places is a 1991 role-playing supplement for Ars Magica published by White Wolf Publishing.

== Contents ==
More Mythic Places is a supplement in which the multi-layered "regio" areas are the focus.

== Reception ==
Matthew Gabbert reviewed More Mythic Places in White Wolf #33 (Sept./Oct., 1992), rating it a 4 out of 5 and stated that "More Mythic Places successfully picks up where its predecessor left off by continuing to supply Storyguides with readily adaptable scenarios and Saga starting points. Well worth the money, the variety of themes offered makes this supplement valuable for virtually any style of play."
