= The Challenge (game) =

The Challenge is a 1990 card game published by Lion Rampant.

== Gameplay ==
The Challenge is a combat card game in which the setting is a fantasy world where players control parties of various races, including Elves, Orcs, Humans, Dwarves, Gnomes, and Halflings. The game focuses on deadly combat, uneasy alliances, and subtle tactics rather than traditional dungeon exploration. Players use 138 cards and a six-sided die to engage in battles. The game includes 30 oversized character cards representing different races, each with unique hit points and skills. The remaining cards are divided into the Action Deck (weapon attacks and defensive parries) and the Mystic Deck (magical attacks and special abilities). Gameplay involves choosing a party and engaging in one-on-one combat, passing turns, or reorganizing strategies. The game is simple to play, with a 6-player game lasting under an hour and a 2-player game concluding in 15 minutes. Players must adapt their strategies based on their card selections and the actions of other players. Victory is achieved by meeting specific game-ending criteria, such as eliminating all opponents or reaching a certain number of points. The game encourages repeated play to fully appreciate its variety and nuances, with different characters and tactics offering diverse gameplay experiences.

== Reception ==
Jim Trunzo reviewed The Challenge in White Wolf #28 (Aug./Sept., 1991), rating it a 4 out of 5 and stated that "The Challenge is an enjoyable beer-and-pretzels game that's great for filling in those spares moments between mowing the lawn and marathon gaming sessions. Game play is quick and the card decks are, though somewhat thin, colorful and well-drawn. So choose a race, select a weapon and issue a challenge."
