= Winter's Tale (disambiguation) =

The Winter's Tale is a play by William Shakespeare.

Winter's Tale may also refer to:

== Films ==
- The Winter's Tale (1910 film), a 1910 film by the Thanhouser Company
- The Winter's Tale (1967 film), a 1967 British television film
- A Tale of Winter (Conte d'hiver), a 1992 French film
- A Winter Tale, a 2007 Canadian film
- Winter's Tale (film), a 2014 film based on the novel by Mark Helprin (also called A New York Winter's Tale)

== Music ==
- The Winter's Tale (EP), by BTOB, 2014
- A Winter's Tale (Larsson), 1938 orchestra suite by Lars-Erik Larsson
- "A Winter's Tale" (David Essex song), 1982
- "A Winter's Tale" (Queen song), 1995
- "A Winter's Tale", a 1968 song by Genesis
- "A Winter's Tale", a song by AFI from AFI
- "A Winter's Tale", a song by Jade Warrior from Last Autumn's Dream

== Stage works ==
- The Winter's Tale (ballet), Christopher Wheeldon's 2014 interpretation of the Shakespeare play
- The Winter's Tale (opera), 2017 opera by Ryan Wigglesworth

== Literature ==
- Winter's Tale (novel), a 1983 novel by Mark Helprin
- "A Winter's Tale", a poem by Dylan Thomas in his 1946 collection Deaths and Entrances
- Winter's Tales, a 1942 short-story collection by Isak Dinesen (Karen Blixen)
- The Breathing Method, subtitled "A Winter's Tale", a novella in the Different Seasons collection by Stephen King
- Germany. A Winter's Tale, an 1844 satire by Heinrich Heine
- A Redwall Winter's Tale, a children's book

== Television ==
- The Winter's Tale, season 3 of BBC Television Shakespeare
- "A Winter's Tale" (Dawson's Creek), a 2001 episode

== Other ==
- Winter's Tale (horse) (1976–2002), a racehorse
- Garfield: Winter's Tail, a video game based on the comic strip Garfield
- A Winter's Tale (Ars Magica), an adventure for the role-playing game Ars Magica
