= Mythic Places =

Mythic Places is a 1991 role-playing supplement for Ars Magica published by White Wolf Publishing.

== Contents ==
Mythic Places is a supplement in which the concept of the multi-layered "regio" area is developed.

== Publication history ==
Mythic Places was the first release in a series of supplements about regio areas.

== Reception ==
Matthew Gabbert reviewed Mythic Places in White Wolf #32 (July/Aug., 1992), rating it a 3 out of 5 and stated that "I enjoyed Mythic Places and look forward to seeing more supplements like it. Each regio could be easily dropped into an ongoing Story or just as easily expanded to be the focus of a new Story. No matter how they got there, your players will find that being in a mythic place is more than half the fun."
