= Roald Tweet =

American historian (1933–2020)

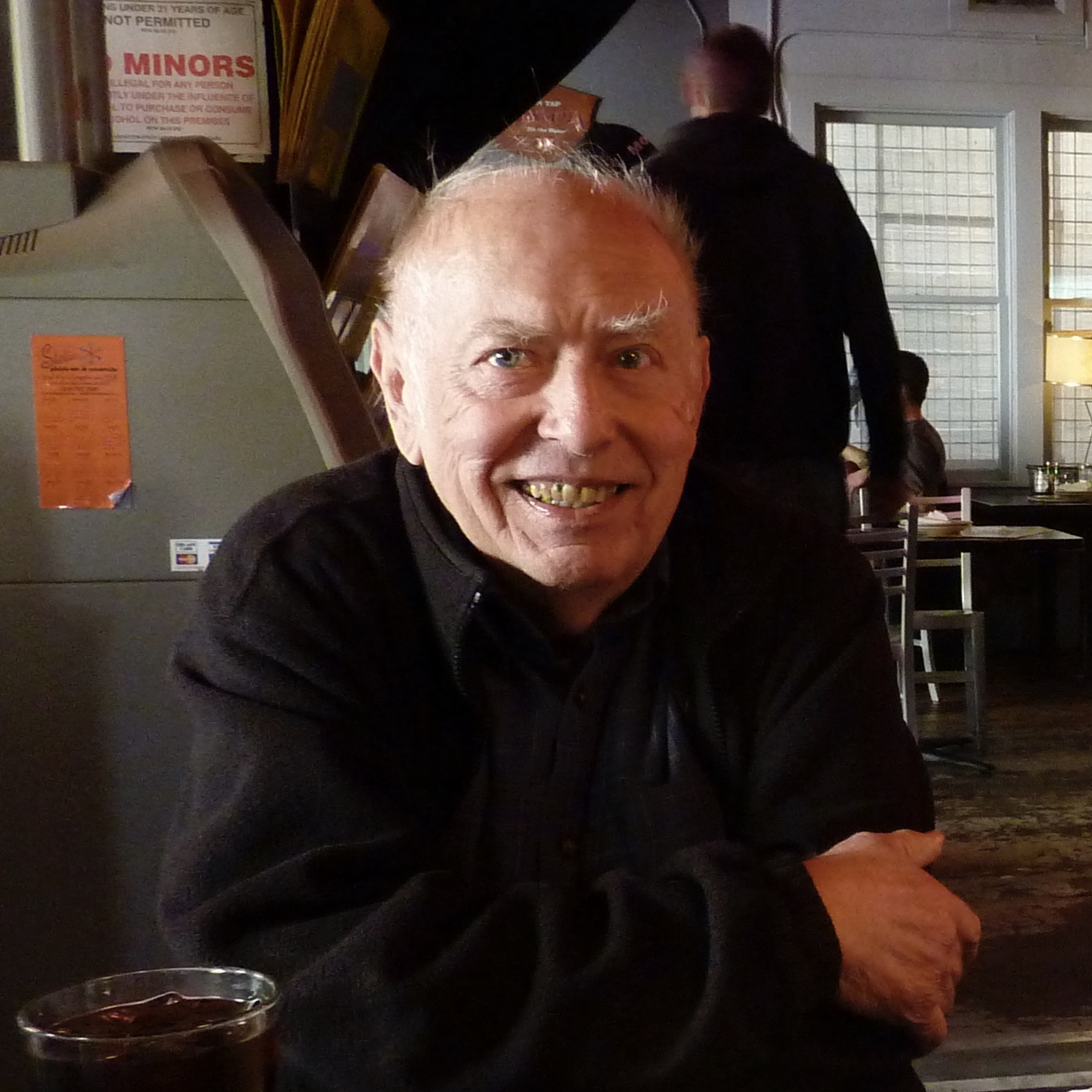
Tweet in 2010

Roald D. Tweet (September 1, 1933 – November 4, 2020) was an American academic.

He worked as a professor of English at Augustana College and a historian of the upper Mississippi River.

== Biography ==
Tweet was the husband of Margaret Tweet, the brother of David Tweet, father of Randall Tweet, Gretchen O'Brien, and Jonathan Tweet.

Tweet was part of the Agustin's Historical Society, St. John's Lutheran Church, Contemporary Club, Eagle Scouts, and a member of Sons of Norway. He earned a master's degree in English and a Ph.D. in American Literature from the University of Chicago. He created three-minute vignettes about local history for his radio series, "Rock Island Lines," which earned the Illinois Humanities Council's Lawrence William Towner Award in 2001. He earned the Studs Terkel Humanities Service Award in 2006. His published books include History of Transportation on the Upper Mississippi and Illinois Rivers, A History of the Rock Island District Corps of Engineers, 1866–1983, and The Quad Cities: An American Mosaic. In 2014, he began co-hosting the writing-related radio show Scribble. He was known as a whittler, and his little wooden birds were popular on Augustana campus.

Tweet died from COVID-19 at OSF Saint Francis Medical Center in Peoria, Illinois, on November 4, 2020. He was 87 years old.
