= I Used to Be a Fish =

2016 children's book by Tom Sullivan

I Used to be a Fish
- Hardcover of I Used to be a Fish
- Author: Tom Sullivan
- Subject: Evolution
- Genre: Children's picture book
- Publisher: HarperCollins/Balzer + Bray
- Publication date: October 11, 2016
- Pages: 48
- ISBN: 9780062451989

I Used to be a Fish is a book written by Tom Sullivan for ages 4–8. A boy imagines his pet fish tells him the story of evolution.

== Overview ==
The 48-page book is drawn in 3 colors: red, blue and white. It was described as similar in style to Dr. Seuss by some reviewers due to the simple drawing style and absurdity of the tale. It includes a timeline and author's note at the end for older children or parents who want material for further discussion.

== About the author ==
Author-illustrator Tom Sullivan was a freelance graphic designer. This is the author's first book. The idea of the book came to him on a different project, “I was thinking about mammals and reptiles and eggs, when I got to frogs. I started to wonder how a frog who used to be a tadpole would describe that experience, and a title for a different story just popped into my head.”

== Reception ==
- "In this engaging introduction to the concept of evolution, an unseen narrator describes how he changed from fish to land animal and beyond, eventually becoming a modern boy at the end of the book. Simple, expressive cartoon drawings depict each stage with humor and purpose. Bold lines, plentiful white space, and careful use of just two colors provide clarity and focus throughout the progression. ... The tone is lighthearted but not overdone, with humorous shifts of facial expressions and postures as the world changes with each page turn. When viewers meet the boy at the end, they also spot the pet fish that must have triggered his imaginative musings. Though clearly inspired by evolution, the fanciful story is not an attempt to accurately represent the scientific process, as an author's note confirms. ... VERDICT: A funny, whimsical look at the wonders of evolution and the power of imagination for early elementary collections." —School Library Journal
- "Simple Seussian illustrations walk small children through evolutionary history while opening kids’ eyes to our world's past and possibilities." —Kate Sharpe News
- " I used to be a fish. But I didn't like swimming anymore. So I grew some legs. Inspired by a pet fish and fueled by imagination, a boy tells a whimsical version of his own life story, which mirrors the process of human evolution. Simple, surprising, and innovative, Tom Sullivan's debut is both a light introduction to the science of evolution and a tribute to every child's power to transform their lives and to dream big." —Children's Book Council
- "A simple, cartoonlike fish prompts musings on the history of human evolution. The text fancifully traces a fish in the water who “got tired of swimming” all the way up in its evolution to a human boy who can fly...The spare text is deceptively simple: there's a lot of science behind statements such as “One day there was a BOOM! / And things got a little crazy.” It all works; although there is artistic license, the science stays on track. To keep fully grounded in fact, don't skip the all-important appended author's note" —Horn Book Review
- "Evolution is, of course, a very complex topic, and Sullivan clarifies that he has written “a fictional story inspired by the science of evolution.” ...Due to Sullivan's choice of palette and style, they will miss the fact of Homo sapiens’ African origins. While the book is visually appealing, the plot is very thin and not likely to inspire demands for rereading." —Kirkus Reviews

== See also ==
- Evolutionary history of life
- Grandmother Fish
