= A Winter's Tale (Ars Magica) =

A Winter's Tale is a 1991 role-playing adventure for Ars Magica published by White Wolf Publishing.

== Plot summary ==
A Winter's Tale is an adventure in which the Covenant the player characters belong to must stop a diabolist coven that wants to end the world.

== Reception ==
Matthew Gabbert reviewed A Winter's Tale in White Wolf #31 (May/June, 1992), rating it a 2 out of 5 and stated that "it is very well-organized, especially considering the time scale of the Saga. At 96 pages, I was very glad an index was included. The interior illustrations are passable and the cover painting is one of the best I've seen on an Ars Magica supplement in some time. Sadly, though, I think the audience for this type of Saga is limited. While the collapse of a Covenant could be an interesting focus for a Saga, the frustration factor of A Winter's Tale is just too high."
