= Troupe system =

Tabletop role-playing game style of play

A troupe system is a way of playing role-playing games in which a group of players takes different roles at different times. The term was coined in Ars Magica, where it referred to each player using multiple characters and, crucially, sharing a pool of characters held in common by the entire group (referred to as the "troupe").

== Troupe play in Ars Magica ==
In Ars Magica, the troupe's characters all belong to a single Covenant - a small group dedicated to the study and utilization of the magical arts. Each player's primary character is their Magus, one of the wizards who form the core of the Covenant. Each player also creates a Companion, a "skilled person who aids magi but is not necessarily in their pay." Finally the group (or troupe) as a whole creates a number of Grogs, mercenaries and other servants hired by the magi.

A typical session of Ars Magica features one player running their Magus while the other players take on the role of either a Companion or Grog. The Grogs are a communal asset, and, thus, over the course of several sessions the same grog may be played by several different players.

The Ars Magica rulebooks also provide for a single player taking on "secondary roles" and playing multiple characters simultaneously (a Magus and their Companion, for example, or multiple Grogs). It is also noted that, "since players switch characters, it is easy to switch storyguides from story to story as well." neither of these features, however, is considered the primary defining trait of "troupe-style play", although they are common features in many Ars Magica campaigns.

== Other examples of troupe play ==
Troupe-style play can also be found in other role-playing games, such as Circle of Hands, (which actually prohibits any player from playing the same character two sessions in a row), and Shock: Human Contact, a science fiction game which starts with a session on a research ship, then a session on a colony, and then additional sessions where characters can be selected from either location.
