= Order of Hermes (Ars Magica) =

The Order of Hermes is a fictional mystical group of wizards in the role-playing game Ars Magica by Atlas Games, set in Mythic Europe.

== History ==
The Order of Hermes was founded by the wizards Trianoma and Bonisagus. Trianoma had the desire to unite the disparate Magi of Europe into a single group, who could learn from one another. She did not know how to accomplish this goal until she met Bonisagus. He had created a consistent theory of magic which would allow magi to share information, using a common frame of reference. Also, he had invented the ritual Parma Magica, a personal, protective, magical shield. Having Parma Magica would allow magi to meet face to face without fear of magical attack. Trianoma became Bonisagus' student, learned his theory and the Parma, then traveled throughout Europe recruiting other wizards. Eleven Magi joined her. Bonisagus and the eleven Magi established twelve Houses in a fellowship called the Hermetic Order of Hermes. The Order quickly recruited like-minded wizards, teaching the protective Parma Magica to Magi, who would take the Order's Oath of mutual cooperation. The wizards who refused to take the Oath were not taught the Parma Magica. Instead, they were hunted down and destroyed.

== Houses ==
Every member of the Order belongs to one of the twelve Houses. The Houses were established by and named after Bonisagus and eleven of the twelve other Founders. Each House is led by a Primus (Latin = "the first", female Prima, general plural Primi). The Primi's authority and duties vary greatly between the Houses, ranging from absolute authority (House Tremere) to mere representation (House Verditius). The Primus lives in the domus magna (Latin = "Great House"), the headquarters of each House.

Bonisagus, Guernicus, Mercere, and Tremere Houses are the True Lineages. This means that each Magus was taught by a Magus of that House, and that master-apprentice relationship goes back to their founding Magus. These Houses are the backbone of the Order of Hermes. Houses Bjornær, Criamon, Merinita, and Verditius are the Mystery Cults of the Order. They are groups of Magi who have been initiated into at least one of their household's Mysteries. Ex Miscellanea, Flambeau, Jerbiton, and Tytalus are social Houses. These Magi are brought together by shared interests, common philosophies, and camaraderie.

Bjornær
Shapeshifters and beast Magi belonging to a Germanic tradition, instead of the Roman or Latinate Tradition. They venerate animal ancestors and strive to perfect the Heartbeast. Each Bjornær has a Heartbeast—an animal, rarely a plant—which is their true form. This House is a Mystery Cult, a gathering of Magi initiated into the same Mysteries. The Outer Mystery opens the Heartbeast and the Inner Mysteries allow the Magi to unlock mythic forms. The Magi are divided into six clans, descending from the House's six original apprentices. These fierce Magi shun the civilized lands and embrace the wilderness. The domus magna is Crintera in the Stubnitz Forest, on the Isle of Rugen in the Rhine Tribunal, which was the first established Tribunal.
Bonisagus
Masters of magical knowledge and theory. Most Magi seek knowledge through scholarship. This House is the most revered True Lineage, continuing to supply knowledge and leadership to the Order. They explore the theoretical applications of magic, delving deep into its arcane secrets. Some Magi follow the example of Trianoma, sharing of knowledge through diplomacy. The Oath of the Order allows the Bonisagi to claim any apprentices from the other Magi, but they are legally required to share all their discoveries. The domus magna is Durenmar, in the Black Forest, in the Rhine Tribunal.
Criamon
Cryptic seers and prophets. They are the mystics of the Order, walking spiritual paths to answer the question posed by their founder, "How do we escape time?" The many paths that they walk may grant powers, which can include immortality. The domus magna is the Cave of Twisting Shadows in the Greater Alps Tribunal.
Ex Miscellanea
Magi from other traditions, who answered the Order's "join us or die" policy by joining the Order. This House was established by Pralix, formerly of House Tytalus, to replace House Diedne. This House gathers Magi who do not fit into any other House. Such Magi may be tied to elements of pre-Hermetic Traditions, or may embrace an eclectic mix of traditions. This House embodies unity in diversity, but the emphasis is on diversity. The domus magna is Cad Gadu in the Stonehenge Tribunal.
Flambeau
Masters of fire magic and combat. They are the champions of the Order, who fight for glory and honor, both their own and that of the Order. The House revels in bold adventurers who seek out and overcome fearsome opponents. Ironically, many of the Oath-breaking Magi are from House Flambeau, as are the Order's law-enforcing Hoplites, who hunt them down. There is one Flambeau lineage that studies magical destruction, Perdo, in lieu of fire. And, a secret lineage is dedicated to the extermination of all Bjornær House Magi. The domus magna is Val Negra in the Provence tribunal. The Fifth Edition changed this to Castra Solis, though the Tribunal remains unchanged. Most of the members of this house come from France and Spain.
Guernicus
The Quaesitores are the official judges and criminal investigators of the Order. By force of law, these Magi have held the basic structures of the Hermetic Order of Hermes intact for over four hundred years. Some act as the Order's historians, having traced their rituals to as far back as the cults of Mercury in Rome and Thoth in Egypt. The domus magna is Magvillus in the Roman Tribunal.
Jerbiton
Experts in the use of Mentem and Imaginem, these Magi live for the pursuit of beauty. They interact with the mundane world beyond the Order, for the sake of beauty, and to avoid the stunted lives that result from living in a closed community. The members are often writers, artists, philosophers, doctors, or other professionals. Some Magi are recruited from the nobility for their diplomatic leverage and aristocratic connections. The domus magna is Valnastium in the Greater Alps Tribunal.
Mercere
The couriers of the Order hold the Magi of Mythic Europe together by facilitating communication, encouraging trade, and aiding the Magi. House membership is not restricted to those "Gifted" with magical abilities, out of respect for the House founder, who lost his Gift. Even those incapable of magic are considered to be full Magi by anyone, who wishes to continue receiving mail. The heralds, heroes, mercenaries, and merchants reflect the contradictions of their House: it is exotic, but traditional; loyal, but self-centered; proud, but humble. The domus magna is Harco in the Roman Tribunal.
Merinita
Nature Magi of a non-Latinate tradition. After their founder disappeared, they reorganized as students of the Faeries under the Primus Quendalon. They move among the Fay, ultimately joining them. Their spells can draw on Faerie glamor, awakening the Fay around them, or inflicting curses upon those who cross them. The domus magna is Irencilia in the Rhine Tribunal.
Tremere
Magi who believe in order, obedience, hierarchy, and coordination. Their founder was weak in magic relative to the other founders of the Order, but he created certamen, the magical duel, as a means of dispute resolution, and as a rite of passage for Tremere Magi. The House tries to control events, by gathering influence and resources to respond to crises as they draw near. They are pragmatic, dutiful, and courageous Magi, who know that Mythic Europe is a chaotic and dangerous place. The domus magna is Coeris in the Transylvanian Tribunal.
Tytalus
Magi who strive to improve themselves through conflict. They believe the main conflict is between an individual's nature and the rules imposed by society. They are famous for their long-term in-House rivalries, convoluted political schemes, and activities that skirt the edge of legality. The domus magna is Fudarus in the Normandy Tribunal.
Verditius
Artificers and enchanters who cannot perform magic without tools. They craft great items, putting a little of themselves into their finest creations. Pride in their creations is often their downfall, making these Magi prone to the most deadly sin. The domus magna is Verdi in the Roman Tribunal.
Diedne
This extinct, non-Latinate House practiced Druidic magic. It was destroyed in the Schism War by Tremere, Flambeau, and Tytalus, supported by the other Latinate Houses. The non-Latinate Houses Bjornær and Merinita ran for cover, re-emerging decades after the War.

== Tribunals ==
The Order is divided into 13 Tribunals, each of which administers a region of Mythic Europe. Once every seven years, the Magi within a Tribunal hold a meeting, called a Tribunal, where new Magi are presented, new Masters are recognized, and new Archmagi are honored. The Quaesitores judge disputes, which cannot be resolved within a covenant, a magical community. The Tribunal is presided over by a Praeco, usually the eldest Magus or Maga present. The legality of the Tribunal is supervised by the ruling Quaesitor, who determines whether a quorum is present to legitimize the proceedings.

Once every 33 years, each Tribunal sends a representative to a Grand Tribunal, which takes place in Durenmar, the domus magna of House Bonisagus. The Grand Tribunal proceeds much like a regional Tribunal, but the Primus of House Bonisagus is always the Praeco, and the Primus of House Guernicus is the ruling Quaesitor.

The 13 Tribunals:

- Greater Alps (mountainous regions of Central Europe)
- Hibernia (Ireland)
- Iberia (Spain and Portugal)
- Levant (the Holy Land)
- Loch Leglean (Scotland)
- Normandy (Northern France and the County of Flanders)
- Novgorod (Russia and parts of Eastern Europe)
- Provence (approximately Occitania, or le Midi of France)
- Rhine (Northern parts of the Holy Roman Empire)
- Rome (Italy)
- Stonehenge (England and Wales)
- Thebes (Balkans)
- Transylvania (Parts of Eastern Europe)

== See also ==
- Order of Hermes (Mage: The Ascension)
