= Black Death (Ars Magica) =

Black Death is a 1991 role-playing adventure for Ars Magica published by White Wolf Publishing.

== Plot summary ==
Black Death is an adventure in which the player characters are informed of a plague striking the town of Monerouge and another nearby Covenant.

== Reception ==
Matthew Gabbert reviewed Black Death in White Wolf #32 (July/Aug., 1992), rating it a 4 out of 5 and stated that "the wealth of Storyguide characters (NPCs), locales, and subplots makes up for any organizational weakness. Quite simply, the theme is thought-provoking, the plot is original, and the roleplaying is challenging. All in all, Black Death is one supplement you should try to catch."
