= Grandmother Fish =

2016 book written by Jonathan Tweet and illustrated by Karen Lewis

Grandmother Fish: A Child's First Book of Evolution
- Hardcover of Grandmother Fish: A Child's First Book of Evolution
- Author: Jonathan Tweet
- Illustrator: Karen Lewis
- Subject: Evolution
- Publisher: Feiwel & Friends Macmillan
- Publication date: September 6, 2016
- Pages: 40
- ISBN: 978-1250113238

Grandmother Fish: A Child's First Book of Evolution is a 2015 book by Jonathan Tweet. Illustrated by Karen Lewis, the book explains Charles Darwin's theory of common descent with a target audience of 3–5-year-olds. It uses a call-and-response interaction between speaker and listener, where the child is asked to mimic the behavior of various animals from our evolutionary past. The book is illustrated by Karen Lewis with colored artwork.

== Overview ==
The book includes additional reading aids:

- An illustration of the evolutionary tree of life.
- Science notes for parents.
- How to explain natural selection to a child.

== Reception ==
Grandmother Fish got mostly positive reviews by reviewers such as School Library Journal, Steven Pinker, and Jonathan Haidt. However, it has been criticised by creationist organizations.

== Publishing history ==
The book was funded by Kickstarter. The book was later picked up by a mainstream publisher. Macmillan released a second edition on September 6, 2016.

== See also ==
- Evolutionary history of life
- I Used to Be a Fish
