= Black Death (album) =

Studio album by Black Death
- Released: 1984
- Genre: Heavy metal
- Length: 51:09
- Label: Auburn; Hells Headbangers
- Producer: Bob Surgent; Black Death

Professional ratings
Review scores
Source	Rating
Louder Sound	3.5/5 stars
Metal Temple	7/10

Black Death is the only studio album by American heavy metal band Black Death, released in 1984 by Auburn Records.

== Release ==
Black Death was released in 1984 by Auburn Records. The album included a bonus EP containing two songs "Here Comes the Wrecking Crew" and "Retribution". The album was reissued in 2017 by Hells Headbangers Records along with the bonus EP.

== Critical reception ==
Reviewing for Louder Sound, Chris Chantler describes the album as an "invigorating keg party classic" with "cosmic stoner grooves, frantic punk energy and a faint residue of hard funk", while acknowledging the status of the band as African-American metal pioneers and praising the "powerful" remaster of an "undervalued rough diamond".

In his review of the official 2017 reissue for Metal Temple, Lior Stein gave a 7/10 rating, saying that "(i)n comparison to the original recording from 1984…there is a margin of improvement in this reissue in terms of the digital remastering." Stein deemed the songwriting "solid, not what you would call over the top, not aiming to be catchy, which is rather in their benefit but enough to be satisfied with" before concluding that the album "is still a relic, a collector's must and earns the respects of the contemporary Metal scene." Kerrang! ranked the third track, "When Tears Run Red (From Love Lost Yesterday)", at number 2 on their list of "The 10 Greatest Metal Songs by African-American Artists".

== Tracklist ==
=== Album track listing ===
Side one
No.	Title	Length
1.	"Night of the Living Death"	4:27
2.	"The Hunger"	5:30
3.	"When Tears Run Red (From Love Lost Yesterday)"	5:41
4.	"Fear No Evil"	6:08

Side two
No.	Title	Length
5.	"The Scream of the Iron Messiah"	3:43
6.	"Streetwalker"	6:30
7.	"Black Death"	9:18

=== Bonus EP track listing ===
Side one
No.	Title	Length
8.	"Here Comes the Wrecking Crew"	4:24

Side two
No.	Title	Length
9.	"Retribution"	5:28

== Personnel ==
Personnel per Hells Headbangers Records.

Black Death

- Siki Spacek – vocals, guitar
- Greg Hicks – guitar
- Darrell Harris – bass
- Phil Bullard – drums

Production

- Bob Surgen, Black Death — producer
- Bill Peter — executive producer
- Eric Broviak – engineer
- Dawn Holt – assistant engineer
- Jack Skinner — mastering
- Anastasia Pantsios— cover photography
- Paula Grooms — cover layout
- Bob Surgent, Lisa Surgent – logo design

== Sources ==
- Black Death (Album notes; compact disc). Black Death. Hells Headbangers Records. 2017. HELLS 209.
