= Ars Magica =

Tabletop fantasy role-playing game

- Fifth edition cover
- Designers: Jonathan Tweet; Mark Rein-Hagen
- Publishers: Lion Rampant; White Wolf; Wizards of the Coast; Atlas Games
- Publication: 1987 (1st edition); 1989 (2nd edition); 1992 (3rd edition); 1996 (4th edition); 2004 (5th edition); 2026 (Definitive Edition)
- Genres: Medieval fantasy
- Systems: d10-based

Ars Magica is a role-playing game set in 'Mythic Europe' – a historically grounded version of Europe and the Levant around AD 1200, with the added conceit that conceptions of the world prevalent in folklore and institutions of the High Middle Ages are factual reality (a situation known informally as the "medieval paradigm"). The players' involvement revolves around an organization of magi and their allies and foes both mundane and supernatural. The game was originally developed by Jonathan Tweet and Mark Rein-Hagen at Lion Rampant, with its first edition published in 1987.

The current edition (the game's fifth) was written by David Chart, and published in 2004 by Atlas Games, who continue to develop new material for it. A definitive edition, based on the fifth edition was crowdfunded in 2024 and shipped in 2026.

In conjunction with the definitive edition, Atlas Games released the entire texts of all fifth edition books, as well as selective supplements for third and fourth edition, under open license. Subsequently, community projects have made the complete texts available online.

Ars Magica was one of the first examples of a troupe system. Early editions recommended that the players collaborate to create the campaign world and story with:

- Each player having an opportunity to be Story Guide. (e.g. alternating by play session, 'chapter' of a story, or at the whim of the troupe)
- Each player having more than one player character; when the primary character lacks opportunity or reason to participate in a session (typically due to laboratory or library activity), a secondary character is played.

The Story Guide scheme has been de-emphasised in recent editions; in the fifth edition it is relegated to an optional play style described at the back of the book. Alternatively a troupe may select one player as the primary story guide responsible for the overall plot, and one or more secondary story guides who run peripheral sessions and/or stories.

To enhance the 'authenticity' of the historical setting, the game uses medieval Latin for a number of key terms, including its Hermetic Magic system.

== History ==
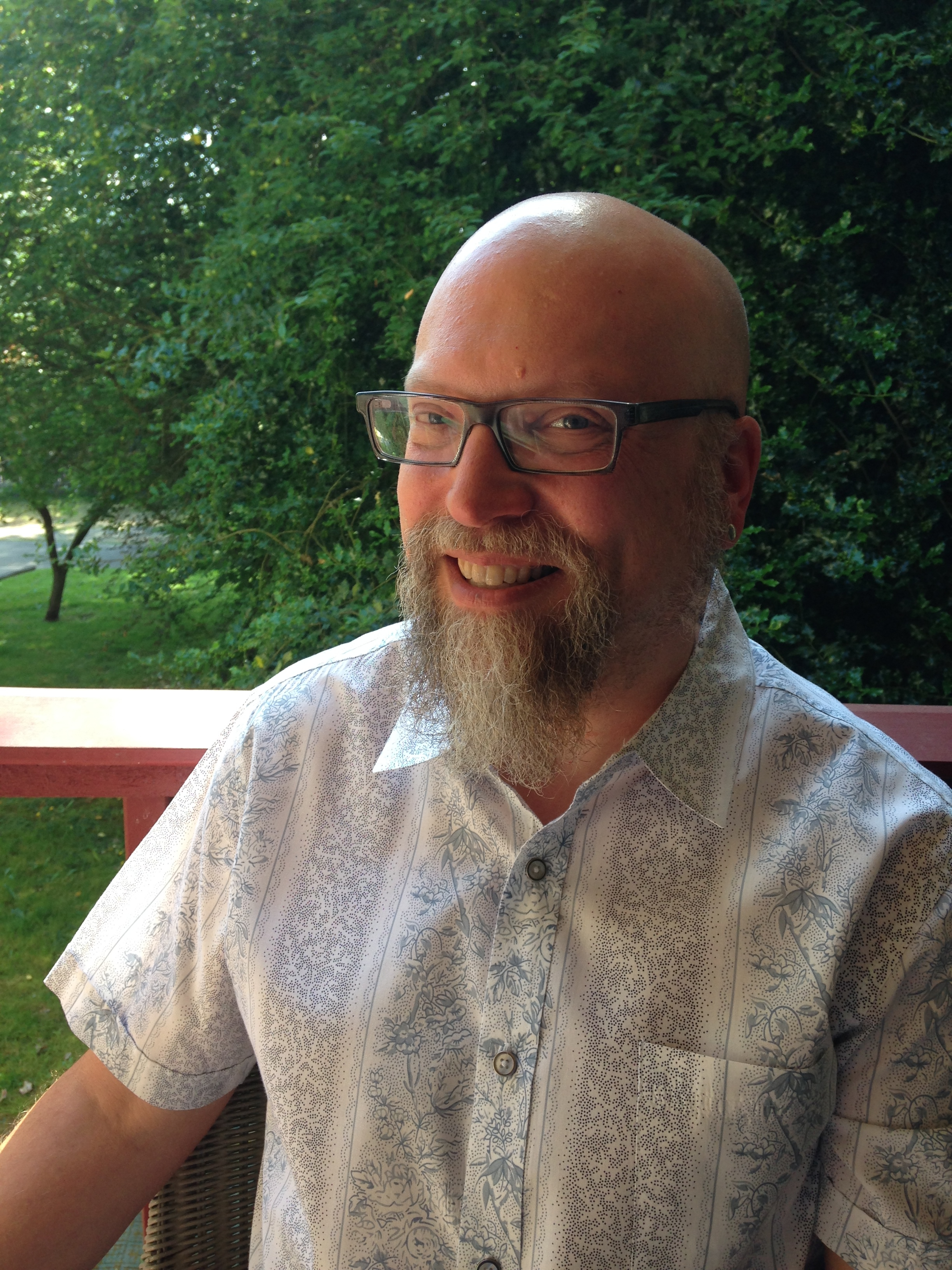
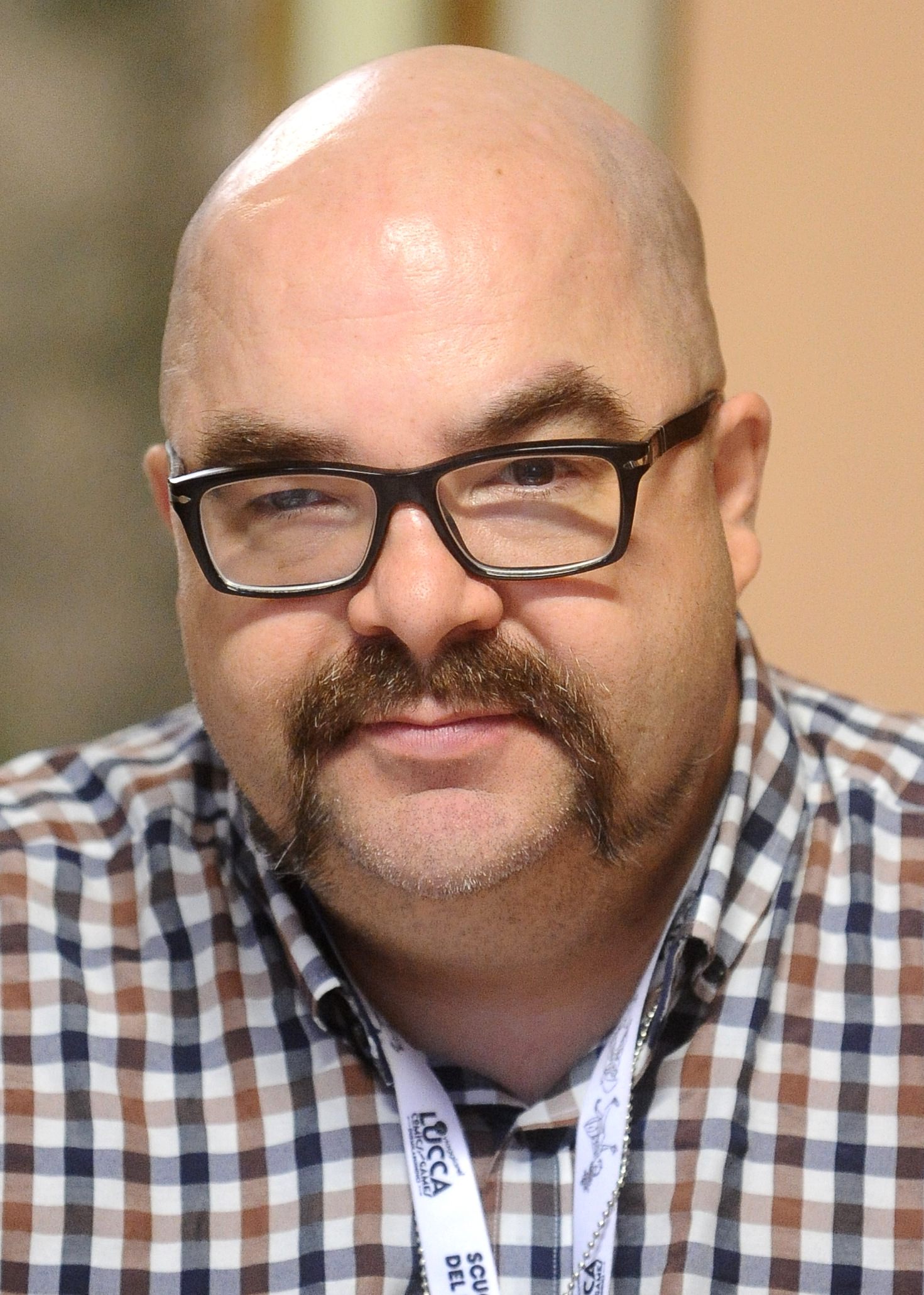
Jonathan Tweet and Mark Rein-Hagen designed Ars Magica.

The first two editions were published by Lion Rampant Games, with several adventures published by Atlas Games. In 1991, Lion Rampant merged with White Wolf Magazine to form White Wolf Game Studio. White Wolf published several adventure modules for the game before adding its third Edition rulebook, co-authored by Rein-Hagen with Ken Cliffe. This revision greatly expanded the settings and peripheral rules while leaving the core system intact. White Wolf then released at least a dozen supplements for Third Edition, including the addition of Divine and Infernal mechanics, rules for shamanic magic, beginning the Tribunal series and completing the 'Four Seasons' tetralogy of stories begun by Lion Rampant.

In 1994, publishing rights for the game were sold to Wizards of the Coast, who brought in Jonathan Tweet and started development on a fourth edition. The company published one supplement for the upcoming edition while republishing two supplements for the older edition. Development fell behind schedule, and on December 5, 1995, Wizards of the Coast announced they would leave the tabletop role-playing business altogether, although this turned out to be a temporary departure.

The next year the rights were sold to Atlas Games, who published the fourth edition developed by Tweet and Jeff Tidball. The core book was nominated for the Origins Award in 1996 for Best Roleplaying Game. Continuing to develop the line, Tidwell added several new stories, continued to expand peripheral material and released an extensive line of Tribunal books.

Atlas then assigned David Chart as line developer and released a fifth edition in 2004. This release made extensive changes to the system, especially the mechanics for combat, experience, and character creation. Many players felt that the alterations to the combat system were long overdue, especially the rules for armour, which in previous editions made wearers much more likely to die in combat. This edition won the Origins Award for "Best Role Playing Game of 2004".

Since 2014, the fourth edition has been distributed for free at Warehouse 23 fronted by Steve Jackson Games.

Many characteristics of the Storyteller system developed by White Wolf can be traced to Ars Magica and the fact that the Storyteller system was developed by one of Ars Magica's co-authors; White Wolf's Mage: The Ascension was envisioned as "Ars Magica in the Modern World", and many of the changes in the third edition of ArM were to make the game-worlds more compatible.

On January 12, 2024, Atlas Games announced that Ars Magica 5th Edition Definitive was in production and would be crowdfunded later in the year.

== Setting ==
The setting, Mythic Europe, is primarily based on Europe of the 12th and 13th centuries; the geography is the same, and the mundane (non-magical) politics are practically identical. However, in Ars Magica the "Medieval paradigm" – the way the world was described or understood in that time period – is the literal truth. In this setting, Faeries actually do steal lost children, Demons cause disease and crop failure, Angels help the righteous, and dragons and other Magical creatures are real (though perhaps forgotten or hidden). In the third edition, to tie the game into the World of Darkness line, this was reality because of the beliefs; other editions distance themselves from this interpretation, simply taking place in a world where those beliefs happen to be true.

Player characters typically alternate between the role of a magus (plural magi; female maga/magae), and a companion (Consors). Companions are select skilled non-magi who help wizards conduct their affairs (as magi tend to be distanced from "mundanes" due to the effects of their magical "Gift"). Additionally, there are a number of Grogs (usually skilled peasants, often bodyguards or watchmen) who can be controlled by any player. (As of the third edition, Grogs are also a viable player 'class'; the fifth edition has added an entire supplement dedicated to 'fleshing out' Grogs.) The wizards generally gather in specialized strongholds called covenants, which are often built in places of power. A covenant is typically a 'home base' where the magi are in charge (though they may travel Mythic Europe for reasons of politics, resources, study or even leisure). Some consider the covenant to be the central character of the game, and the official rules encourage troupes to develop the covenant along those lines.

=== The Order of Hermes ===
Standard player-character magi belong to the Order of Hermes, a society of magically "Gifted" humans which was inspired in 767 A.D. by the witch Trianoma and magus Bonisagus after the latter developed a breakthrough in communicating and manipulating magic (termed 'Hermetic Magic' for its roots in both the Greek deity Hermes, upon which the ancient Roman Cult of Mercury was based, and the works of the legendary figure Hermes Trismegistus). While magicians at this time were scattered, rarely social and highly distrustful of each other as a rule, two factors strongly favored mutual co-operation. One was Trianoma's political vision of an organization that would unite the Gifted for their mutual benefit. The other was Bonisagus' second breakthrough, the Parma Magica (loosely translated as "magic shield"): a highly efficient and easily taught personal ritual which could allow these disparate individuals and traditions to meet on common ground with some assurance of safety. Over subsequent centuries, with very few exceptions, magi who quit or refuse to join the Order have been hunted down and destroyed, giving the Order a definite monopoly over magical resources within its 'jurisdiction'.

While each of the Order's twelve Houses maintains a distinct baseline or tradition in pursuing and transmitting knowledge and power, the Order is also divided into Tribunals, each defined by a geographic region of Mythic Europe. Each Tribunal holds a gathering of its magi once every seven years; attendance is not mandatory, though it is essential for certain procedures (e.g. those who have completed their apprenticeships are formally presented for official membership; the Quæsitores judge the types of disputes deemed beyond simple inter- or intra-covenant resolution). Once every 33 years, each Tribunal sends a representative to the Grand Tribunal at the site of the Order's founding in the Black Forest.

The Tribunals loosely correspond to groupings or portions of modern-day nations; each has a distinct cultural and historical flavor which is expanded in the Tribunals of Hermes series. For example, the Roman Tribunal is a densely populated area with a shortage of magical resources, offering highly politicized plot-lines (both within and without the Order itself); Novgorod features vast areas of harsh wilderness, where pagan tribal warfare and magical beasts are significantly more common than elsewhere.

- Greater Alps – including Switzerland with the Alpine regions of Austria and northern Italy.
- Iberian – the precursors to Spain and Portugal; note the Reconquista as current political climate
- Normandy – Northern France and what will soon be known as the Low Countries
- Provençal – Southern France
- Roman – Italy
- Theban – Greece, Bulgaria and Western Asia Minor
- Transylvanian – what will become the Balkans
- Rhine – centered on the Rhine River, core of the Holy Roman Empire
- Novgorod – the broader cultural region known as Rus', including Poland
- Stonehenge – England and Wales
- Loch Leglean – Scotland
- Hibernian – Ireland
- Levantine – lands of the Eastern Mediterranean known as the Levant

As with any system of borders not contingent on clear demarcation such as a river or wall, the territory of each Tribunal is rarely defined with precision; this is partially illustrated (via the fifth edition Covenants book) with the 'Tribunal Border' characteristic, which situates a covenant in a location that could place it in more than one Tribunal (depending on political favors, conflicts over resources, and so on). Such ambiguity can exist even with "clear" borders such as rivers or mountain ranges, since incorporating supernatural aid or power into the structure (and perhaps the constituency or lifestyle of its inhabitants) can allow them to thrive even in the middle of either such feature.

=== Realms of Power ===
The overarching premise of the Ars Magica setting is that the "mundane" world of ordinary, physical existence is a place where four great supernatural forces have varying degrees of influence and presence.

The Divine realm
This is the supreme, holy force of Creation – God as represented by the scriptures of the Abrahamic religions, and his agents in the world. Divine influence diminishes anything not attuned to it (i.e. anything of a Faerie, Infernal or Magical nature) and is categorically opposed to all things Infernal. One of the Order's struggles is in reconciling their avoidance of mundane politics with the inexorable spread of the Dominion (Divine influence permeating the land as more land is settled by Christian and Muslim nations and more centers of Divine worship are constructed).
The Infernal realm
Satan and his demonic forces. In the medieval context, this includes everything from Satan himself to illnesses and bad smells. Demons are compelled to corrupt, destroy, and tempt all mortals to sin; while the Order of Hermes refuses to explicitly name the Infernal as their enemies (which it is assumed would draw too much attention and wrath to the Order), they have been forbidden from entering into agreements with Hell's minions ever since a corruption scandal nearly ruined House Tytalus in the 11th century. As the evil/negative counterpart to the Divine, Infernal power also weakens the effects of any Realm not attuned to Hell or other forsaken spaces. Infernally tainted forms of magic do exist, usually of great deceptive or destructive power, or acquired too easily for understanding, especially in order to tempt magi. Anyone in the Order found guilty of diabolism is expelled and hunted down.
The Faerie realm
Creatures of traditional fairy tales. These creatures are often capricious, sometimes malicious, but invariably addicted to (even dependent upon for their very existence) human attention, emotion and creative expression. Despite such considerations, Study of the Faerie realm can be rewarding to some. Magi are allowed to associate with the Fae (in fact, one House of the Order has become increasingly dominated by its members' pursuit of 'Faerie Magic') as long as they do not incur their wrath and thereby endanger their fellows.
The realm of Magic
A mysterious arcane force, to which all magi (among other rare entities) are inherently attuned. This is the power almost exclusively used to cast spells and enchant objects. Magic and Faerie have some positive resonance with each other, reflected in either aura's benefit to the other realm's powers, and in that remote or lost pagan traditions can have connections with either (in some cases, Faerie entities seem to have 'replaced' Magical ones when the devotees of the latter either lost their way or became extinct).

Additionally, a "Realm of Reason" appeared in the third edition. This was associated with skepticism and empirical observation, and its "rational aura" challenged most supernatural effects. Many fans of the game consider this to be paradoxical and inconsistent, since applying reason and rationality to the world of Ars Magica should really lead to the conclusion that magic does exist and fairies are real, etc., and yet the "True Reason" promoted by this fifth realm posited the contrary, and thus resembled a delusional (yet effective) state of mind rather than a rational one. The realm of Reason had additional counter-intuitive effects – for example, imposing penalties on wizard's magic use when in prominent mundane libraries, despite the predominant portrayal of Hermetic Magic as a scholarly pursuit.

Reason proved an unwelcome addition to the game; neither the fourth nor fifth edition have included this 'Realm', and all references to it have been stricken from the canonical setting.

== System ==
=== Die-rolling conventions ===
There are eight Characteristics: Intelligence, Perception, Strength, Stamina, Presence, Communication, Dexterity and Quickness. Each one is generally rated from −5 to +5 for humans and a Characteristic of 0 is considered 'average'. To perform a typical action, one of the Characteristics is added to a relevant Ability, and a d10 is rolled. The total of Characteristic + Ability + die roll is compared to a target difficulty or Ease Factor; the action succeeds if the rolled total is greater than or equal to the target number.

If the action is routine or trivial and nothing in particular is at stake, the roll is read as 1–10 and simply added to the total (this is called a "Simple roll"). If there is an opportunity for exceptional success or failure, the die is read as 0–9 and is called a "Stress" roll. For Stress rolls, results of "1" and "0" have special significance. A '1' is rerolled and the result doubled (consecutive "1"s redouble the eventual "non-1", with consecutive '1's each redoubling the result again). A roll of '0' is also re-rolled (more than once in cases of especially hazardous activity) as a Botch roll. If any botch die also comes up '0', the action has been botched: failed in some disastrous way. Otherwise, the roll merely equals zero, and the character is assumed to have been unsuccessful at whatever they were trying to accomplish.

=== Magic system ===
The centerpiece of Ars Magica is the system of Hermetic Magic devised by Bonisagus. It consists of 15 Arts, divided into 5 Techniques and 10 Forms. This is sometimes called a "Verb/Noun" system: the Technique is the verb (what effect the magic has), and the Form is the noun (the entity, object or substance that is affected or brought forth). These 'verb-noun' combinations can be used to cast both Formulaic spells (which are recorded in texts, are learned through study and mastered through experience, and have known, fixed effects) and Spontaneous spells (which a caster improvises with no prior knowledge other than the Arts themselves, giving the potential results greater flexibility but lower potency). Every apprentice (with a few Ex Miscellanea exceptions) is "opened" in all 15 Arts before fully joining the Order; each Art begins with a Score of 0 and a mage may usually only increase one of them during a season (see below).

Each Technique is named by a first-person singular present tense indicative Latin verb:

- Creo ("I create") brings objects and substances into existence from nothing, or makes an already-existing target a "more perfect" version of itself (e.g. healing magic, as healed bodies are nearer perfection than wounded bodies).
- Intellego ("I perceive") detects or reveals, enhances a target's natural senses or conveys supernatural ones.
- Muto ("I transform") alters the nature of a being, object or substance, adding unnatural traits and/or removing natural ones.
- Perdo ("I destroy") decays, disintegrates or otherwise diminishes the target, making something a worse example of its kind (i.e. the opposite of Creo).
- Rego ("I control") involves manipulation of the target in any way that does not alter its nature, e.g. direct a target's movement, put a creature to sleep, or force a tree to bear fruit out of season. This is the main Technique used in spells of protection or 'warding'.

Each Form is named by a singular accusative Latin noun:

- Animal affects "all natural living things that are not plants or humans, doing to animals what Mentem and Corpus spells do to people" as well as "things made with animal products" such as leather, wool, cheese, silk, etc. Since bacteria were unknown in medieval times, illness (e.g.) was considered either a form of possession or an imbalance of 'bodily humors'; thus, magic dealing with disease is relegated variously to Creo, Mentem and/or Vim effects.
- Auram affects lightning, wind and gaseous substances; other weather effects typically require an Aquam requisite (see below).
- Aquam is used for any liquid, with the exception of blood (which requires Animal or Corpus magic to affect); non-liquid forms of water will involve requisites (see below).
- Corpus (the incorrect declension Corporem was used in older editions) applies to the human body, making it crucial to longevity formulas.
- Herbam primarily involves plants, but applies equally to any organic matter, living or dead, that is not of animal origin.
- Ignem involves light and heat, and is heavily represented in the fire spells of House Flambeau.
- Imaginem (previously Imagonem) deals with images, sounds, and other sensory stimuli (thus is involved in most illusionary effects).
- Mentem deals with emotions, memories, thoughts and spirits.
- Terram involves earth and minerals: mere soil is the simplest target, while stone, metal and gems require progressively greater investment of spell levels to achieve the same effect.
- Vim ("power") involves magic itself, as well as demons (the overlap is not widely understood, but the fact that there is one is a significant obstacle to the Order's 'public relations', particularly concerning the Church).

A mage's skill when casting a spell is the sum of their scores in the appropriate technique and form.

Some spells involve more than one Technique, and/or more than one Form at once; each Art used in addition to the basic pair is called a requisite. All relevant Art Scores are compared: the caster's lowest Technique and lowest Form are used, reflecting the limiting of the caster's magical knowledge.

Regardless of how high one's Art Scores may rise, there are outer boundaries to the application of Hermetic Magic (whether Formulaic, Spontaneous or even Ritual). Bonisagus's theory outlines a set of inherent Limits, similar in concept to the laws of physics; the two central, 'Greater' Limits are:

1. Magic cannot influence a pure manifestation of the Divine; while earthly Relics (however sacred) and agents of the Divine (anything "separate from the mind of God") may be resistant to magic they are not immune, but it is impossible to (e.g.) interfere with a Miracle (which may be prayed for by an agent or supplicant, but is itself a direct intervention by Divine will).
2. Magic cannot permanently change a target's Essential Nature (the implications of which vary depending on the target in question).

There are also eleven 'Lesser Limits' (addressing more specific 'blind spots' such as aging, creation, time and the soul) which are generally thought either to derive from the two Greater Limits, or to be flaws in Hermetic Theory which may eventually be 'corrected'.

Additional statistics for every spell (which have been redefined in nearly every new edition of the game) are Target (what or whom the spell is directed at), Range (how far the Target may be from the caster), and Duration. For reasons of balance, some spells require the expenditure of "vis" – magical essence in physical form – which all magi and covenants tend to make a point of hoarding and/or trading. No Creo effect, for example, can be permanent unless vis is consumed during the casting. Some Formulaic Magic is so effective that it can only be achieved with vis and an elaborate, time-consuming ritual (hence, Ritual Spells). This automatically applies to any spell of a greater Level than 50, any spell with a Duration of 'Year', and any non-Imaginem spell with a range of 'Sight'.

=== Character development ===
All characters (magi, companions and grogs alike) improve their Abilities by applying experience which can be earned through Exposure, Practice, Training or Study. Magic, however, is stressed as a multifaceted discipline with a greater variety of avenues for improvement. Magi are expected to spend months at a time with books and/or laboratory equipment: inventing new spells (or learning or modifying existing ones), strengthening their Arts, enchanting items, and so forth. Ars Magica includes rules for magical research within the game's standard 'advancement' timescale of 3-month seasons.

These seasonal activities generally concern either study of a text or laboratory activity. Although participating in adventures, missions and other endeavors outside of seasonal activity gives characters Story Experience, the most substantial progress (and the raison d'etre of many in the Order) is nearly always from the seasonal activities of magi. Hence, time in an Ars Magica campaign may pass much faster than in other RPGs (if, for example, all player-characters are engaged in seasonal activity, standard "roleplaying sessions" are unnecessary for that period) but is also more 'accounted for' (since regular and exact periods of activity give highly defined benefits). To accommodate this, many magi prolong their lives with unique (to each individual) longevity formulas (generally called "longevity potions", though the form one takes is not always a potion); this only delays the aging process, however; beyond a certain point one's longevity formula will have no effect at all and must be reformulated (preferably with increased knowledge of the appropriate Arts and/or greater quantities of vis). The increased longevity has led to a prevalent attitude among members of the Order that Companions in general (and Grogs almost invariably) will come and go – perhaps killed in action, occasionally living long enough to retire – while the Magi carry on. Magi may concoct longevity formulas for non-magi, but this is a rare consideration, less effective than devising one's own personal formula, and is an expensive prospect in time and resources in any case.

Study is primarily achieved with texts, each designed to enhance an Ability, Art or specific Spell(s). A respectable covenant inevitably requires either a respectable library or sufficient commodities to exchange for the use of other libraries, since the dominant form of Hermetic Magic is a scholarly pursuit. Magi who are able to write useful books or teach well can use these as commodities, trading with other magi for books or training (though the Code of Hermes places limits on what its members may sell to 'mundanes').

Lab Projects concern projects to enhance one's repertoire of spells or magical artifacts. All projects have a level of effect to which the character compares their 'Lab Total': Intelligence + Magic Theory ability + sum of a Form and Technique + other bonuses (which may be from local Aura, quality and specialization of lab, assistants, special knowledge, sympathetic connections from items, and in some circumstances an additional Ability). Some merely require a Lab Total to match the Level of Effect; more extensive endeavors simply add up each Lab Total in 'points' until twice the Level of Effect are accumulated.

The following Lab Projects are the most commonly pursued:

- Invent Spells. The magus invents a new magical effect from scratch. A variation of a known spell is easier to invent than a completely original one.
- Enchant Device. The magus may create a magical artifact which may hold a magical effect like those of Spells. These can be used by even nonmagical individuals. Usually they cost vis to make, but the Lab Total gets a bonus based on the sympathetic Shape & Material bonus of the material used; e.g. if one is enchanting a staff, the fact that it is a staff gives a bonus when the chosen effect is 'controlling things at a distance'. They can be made as Charged Devices (which cost no vis but have a limited number of uses), Lesser Devices (which may only hold one effect, and must have a Level of Effect that the Lab Total can reach in a single season), or Invested Devices (which require additional preparation in advance and thus must be enchanted over several seasons, and may hold several effects based on size and material).
  - Enchant Talisman. A Talisman is a personalized form of Invested Device with many additional features. Talismans have a much higher capacity for effects with which they may be enchanted, and are easier to enchant. However, should a Talisman fall into the wrong hands, it leaves the magus very vulnerable.
- Longevity Ritual. A Creo Corpus effect that prolongs the magus' life by granting a bonus for Aging Rolls, making it more likely to avoid the deterioration of age which typically begins after 35 years. Thus may a magus live two centuries or longer, barring other mishaps. Magi often pay specialists to devise this ritual for them, to get a better effect than they can personally achieve.
- Bond with Familiar. The magus may form a powerful mystical connection with another creature. Usually this will be an animal which is thematically attuned to the magus' personality and/or specialty: an Auram magus might bond with a bird, or a Herbam magus with a squirrel. The Bonding process is long and hard, but may very well be worth the effort. The animal learns to communicate with the owner, and while it does not become intelligent per se, it is almost always brighter than a normal animal of its type. One major benefit of the bond is that the Familiar can be invested with many enchantments (with restrictions as to target and activation), but the primary, unique benefits are from the Bond Scores: the Gold Cord concerns magic, and helps the magus avoid magical botches; the Silver Cord concerns the mind, helps keep the magus focused and if strong enough may permit speech and telepathy between the two; and the Bronze Cord concerns the body, making the magus more enduring and tough.

== Publications ==
=== Sourcebooks, first edition ===
- Whimsy Cards (1987)
- Jump-Start Kit (1988)
- Covenants (1990)
- The Order of Hermes (1990)
- Saga Pack (1990)
- Faeries (1991)
- Mythic Places (1991)
- Medieval Bestiary (1991)
- More Mythic Places (1991)
- The Maleficium (1992)
- Pax Dei (1993)
- The Tribunals of Hermes: Iberia (1993)
- The Wizard's Grimoire (1993)

Other

- Melos Caverna - Lion Rampant produced this CD to be used as background music to accompany underground adventures

=== Adventures, first edition ===
- The Broken Covenant of Calebais (1988)
- The Stormrider (1989)
- Tales of the Dark Ages (1990)
- The Tempest (1990)
- The Pact of Pasaquine (1991)
- Trial by Fire (1991)
- A Winter's Tale (1991)
- Black Death (1991)

=== Supplements, second edition ===
- Houses of Hermes (1994)

== Reception ==
Stewart Wieck reviewed Ars Magica for White Wolf #11, rating it 10 out of 10 overall, and stated that "I really don't think I can praise 'Ars Magica' highly enough. This is simply one of those games that you must get."

In the December 1988 edition of Dragon (Issue 140), Ken Rolston was effusive in his praise, calling Ars Magica "a distinctive, original, and intriguing treatment of magic for fantasy role-playing games... earnest, colorful, and meticulous in its development of a magic system with a plausible, coherent rationale. Its attempts to integrate this magic into a historical context are persuasive, and the game master notes and staging tips are wonderfully perceptive." Rolston concluded, "This is the most interesting and original fantasy role-playing system and setting I've seen in a long time."

In Issue 9 of the games magazine Gateways, Ian Harac noted, "Obviously, a game of this nature requires a lot of magic material, and that it provides. While the spell lists are not as extensive as those in Advanced Dungeons & Dragons (thank the gods) or Rolemaster, they are better thought out and more 'realistic'." Despite this, Harac questioned whether this was a fully realized game, writing "I can't see myself running a full campaign in it, using only the rules here; they would require a little tinkering and expanding before they were really useful for full-scale play." xxx concluded, "Like a lot of new games, Ars Magica is best bought as a sourcebook of information on wizards, with many great ideas, but not quite complete enough to be a full system. If and when the other books come out, my opinion may alt.er quite a bit; two or three more books with the same degree of depth and presentation will form a very interesting role-playing environment."In Issue 9 of the Canadian games magazine Gateways,

Six months later, Rolston revisited Ars Magica for a more in-depth review in the July 1989 edition of Dragon. Rolston noted that "the quality of writing, editing, and presentation is first-class", and he admired the "storyguide" system of role-playing: "This emphasis on the dramatic and narrative elements of role-playing produces some distinctive and thought-provoking perspectives on commonly accepted conventions of role-playing gaming." Although Rolston gave good marks for the game mechanics, character creation system and combat rules, he was especially drawn to the magic, which he said "has elegant tone and atmosphere." He also liked the quasi-historical medieval setting. He concluded with strong recommendation: "The Ars Magica game features an original and exciting game system, a coherent and satisfying treatment of magic, a convenient and imaginative exploitation of a historical medieval setting, and an explicit and appealing presentation of a role-playing style that emphasizes the common development of the setting, narrative, and PC-group activity over the personal expression of the individual PC."

In the March 1989 edition of Games International (Issue #3), Paul Mason believed that this game "truly encourages joint creativity." He also admired the game mechanics based around single rolls of a ten-sided die, although he found the rules added some unnecessary complications. He suggested that "combat was the weakest part of the game", finding the game mechanics were too "war-gamey". But he called the magic system "the centrepiece of the game." He concluded by giving this game an above-average rating of 4 out of 5, saying, "If you're looking for a new game to take you away from mechanics and 20th century rationalizations, back into the lands of mystery and enchantment, then this is it."

In Issue 43 of Abyss (Spring 1989), Dave Nalle was disappointed, calling this, "a game whose designers are intelligent and imaginative and which tries very hard to be innovative [but] is a dismal failure." Nalle found problems with the character creation system, the strictures on character classes, and the system of choosing character personalities from a list instead of being developed by the player. Nalle did like the magic system, and the included bestiary, but pointed out, "Ars Magica makes the individual secondary to the group and role-playing less significant that goal achievement. The mechanics inhibit role-playing." Nalle concluded, "There are things in Ars Magica which are worth looking at, but don't put it on the top of your wish list."

In the October–November 1989 edition of Space Gamer (Vol. II, Issue 2), J.M. Caparula commented that "In the end, Ars Magica is a superb roleplaying game, one that furthers the gaming art in a positive direction."

In the February–March 1990 edition of Games International (Issue 13), Dave Morris applauded the change in the second edition from four types of dice rolls — something he had initially complained about in the first edition — to only two types of dice rolls. He also admired the re-organization of the magic system, and pointed out that rather than a sample scenario often found in other RPGs, Ars Magic offered a sample setting. Morris called this "a more productive inclusion in the main book than a scenario." He concluded by giving the second edition an excellent rating of 9 out of 10, saying, "it's worth buying for the ideas and the imaginative vision of its authors, even if you don't plan to play it."

Stewart Wieck reviewed the revised edition of Ars Magica in White Wolf #19 (Feb./March 1990), rating it a 5 out of 5 and stated that "The only other fantasy game which so thoroughly takes advantage of the art of role-playing is Pendragon by Chaosium. Ars Magica owes something to Pendragon, but the unique setting and beautiful magic system of Ars Magica truly sets it apart from all the rest."

In his 1990 book The Complete Guide to Role-Playing Games, game critic Rick Swan liked the extensive magic system, but thought "The game's biggest flaw is its combat system, which is far too complicated for an RPG that downplays physical encounters." Swan concluded by giving the game a rating of 3.5 out of 4, saying, "Though the magic rules are fascinating, they're probably too sophisticated for newcomers. But for experienced players, Ars Magica is one terrific product; this is wizardly role-playing at its finest."

Matthew Gabbert reviewed Ars Magica third edition in White Wolf #39 (1994), rating it a 5 out of 5 and stated that "One thing that pleases me about the new edition is that it doesn't make all the previous sourcebooks obsolete. Your investment in older Ars Magica products hasn't been wasted. If you've never tried the system, this edition is a wonderful way to start."

In Issue 2 of the French games magazine Backstab, Sébastien Thorel was of two minds about the 4th edition, writing, "The problem is that the poor quality of the layout and artwork, combined with labored writing, makes reading this book an ordeal. Yet, the changes are significant and often well-implemented." Thorel concluded by giving this edition a rating of 8 out of 10 for new players but only 6 out of 10 for experienced Ars Magica players, writing, "Ars Magica has been enhanced — indeed, vastly improved — by the modifications introduced in this volume. Nevertheless, while this new edition is essential for newcomers, it remains merely an option for long-time aficionados."

In a 1996 reader poll conducted by the British role-playing magazine Arcane to determine the 50 most popular roleplaying games of all time, Ars Magica was ranked 19th. Editor Paul Pettengale commented: "This is a fantasy game for the thinking player – although there's plenty of scope for action, too. A first success for Jonathan Tweet and Mark Rein-Hagen, who both went on to even bigger things, Ars Magica includes one of the most flexible, highly-regarded magic systems in the roleplaying hobby. The game, which places heavy emphasis on storytelling, is extremely popular with fans who have followed its troubled history through four different publishers. With Atlas just about to produce a new edition, those fans are currently feeling suitably optimistic." Several issues later, Andrew Rilstone reviewed the fourth edition of Ars Magica, rating it a 9 out of 10 overall, and commenting "Literate, cerebral, thoughtful, intelligent, with its roots firmly planted in medieval history and philosophy. If the subject matter interests you, then Ars Magica could be the basis of the most in-depth campaign you've ever played. A classic reborn."

Eric T. Baker, writing for Realms of Fantasy, thought the major change in the fifth edition was the combat system, writing "The one-on-one flavor has been streamlined and a squad-based system has been added to allow larger engagements." Baker concluded, "All in all, it remains one of the most compelling RPGS ever created."

== Awards ==
- At the 1988 Origins Awards, the first edition was
  - Winner of the Gamer's Choice Award for Best Fantasy Role-playing Game
  - Finalist in the category "Best Role-Playing Rules"
- At the 2005 ENnies, the fifth edition won
  - the Gold for "Best Rules"
  - the Silver for "Best Production Values".

== Other reviews ==
- Valkyrie #15 (1997)
- Pyramid #24 (March/April 1997)
- Dosdediez (Número 3 – Mar/Abr 1994)
- Pyramid – Fifth Edition
