= Black Death (American band) =

American heavy metal band

- Origin: Cleveland, Ohio, U.S.
- Genre: Heavy metal
- Years active: 1977–1984, 2009–present
- Members: Greg Hicks
- Past members: See: Band members

Black Death is an American band that has been noted as the "first all-African-American heavy metal band". The group were mentioned in Ian Christe's book Sound of the Beast: The Complete Headbanging History of Heavy Metal, and in Rock 'n' Roll and the Cleveland Connection by Deanna R. Adams as "one of the only, if not the only, all-black metal bands in the country" in 1987.

== History ==
=== Lineup, name, and status ===
Black Death was formed in 1977 by guitarist Greg Hicks, drummer Phil Bullard, and bassist Clayborn Pinkins as an unnamed group. They persisted for a year without a vocalist until Siki Spacek joined; Spacek also played guitar for the band alongside Hicks. The band did not have an official name until two years after forming. Hicks and Pinkins decided on "Black Death." Shortly thereafter, Pinkins was shot and killed. The resulting lineup changes consisted of two new bassists, the latter of which, Darell Harris, would become the final member of the classic lineup heard on the band's debut album.

At the end of the band's first major hiatus from 1988 to 2009, the lineup officially reformed as "Mandrake." There was an unofficial change in 2007 by Bullard in an effort to change Black Death's name, but this was not fulfilled until after his death in 2008 from colon cancer. The band was then split into two separate groups, one of which was rechristened as Siki Spacek and the Resurrection (later known as Black Death Resurrected, which was Bullard's original idea for the band's new name); the second group toured until disbanding in 2010.

The band's activities and scheduling, along with other announcements, are listed on their Facebook page.

=== Recording efforts and distribution ===
Black Death has released one full-length album. There have been rumors about a second album, which were almost fulfilled in a release of a "1998 [LP]-length demo." Several unnamed demos were recorded in their formative years, after the death of Pinkins in 1979. A 2017 compilation of older recording was released, and is Black Death's only recording available on Spotify.

Black Death's first LP was re-released in physical format by records and distribution company Hells Headbangers. This republishing sparked mild interest in the band, with magazines such as Decibel and Kerrang! acknowledging the band's existence.

== Members ==
Current members

- Greg Hicks – guitars, bass (1977–1985)

Notable past members

- Siki Spacek – vocals, guitars (1977–1988)
- Phil Bullard – drums (1977–1985, died 2008)
- Clayborn Pinkins – bass (1977–1979, died 1979)
- Darrell Harris – bass (1980–1985)
- Stanley Gore – drums (1986–1988)
- Joe Harris – bass (1987–1988)
- Vincent Lindsay – guitars (1987–1988, died 2018)

== Discography ==
Studio albums

- Black Death (1984)

Compilation albums

- Until We Rock: The Early Recordings of Black Death (2017)

Compilation appearances

- Cleveland Metal (1983 compilation)
  - 1. "Taken by Force"
  - 2. "Until We Rock"

== Sources ==
- Greg Hicks – founding member and current Black Death copyright holder – http://www.blackdeathband.com
- Christe, Ian (2003). Sound of the Beast: The Complete Headbanging History of Heavy Metal. HarperCollins. ISBN 0380811278
