= Everway =

Fantasy tabletop role-playing game by Jonathan Tweet

Visionary Roleplaying
- Cover art by Susan Harris
- Designers: Jonathan Tweet
- Publishers: Wizards of the Coast; Rubicon Games; Gaslight Press; The Everway Company
- Publication: 1995; 31 years ago
- Genres: Fantasy
- Systems: Custom, diceless
- Website: www.everwaygame.com
- ISBN: 1-880992-76-0

Everway is a fantasy role-playing game first published by Wizards of the Coast under their Alter Ego brand in 1995. Its lead designer was Jonathan Tweet. Marketed as a "Visionary Roleplaying Game", it has often been characterized as an innovative concept with limited commercial success. Wizards later abandoned the line, and Rubicon Games purchased it and published several supplements. The line was sold again to Gaslight Press in February 2001. The line is currently with The Everway Company, which has released a Silver Anniversary Edition.

== Publication details ==
Everway was released as a boxed set designed by Jonathan Tweet, Jenny Scott, Aron Anderson, Scott Hungerford, Kathy Ice, Bob Kruger, and John Tynes, with illustrations by Doug Alexander, Rick Berry, Daniel Gelon, Janine Johnston, Hannibal King, Scott Kirschner, Ed Lee, John Matson, Martin McKenna, Ian Miller, Jeff Miracola, Roger Raupp, Andrew Robinson, Christopher Rush, and Amy Weber, and cover art by Susan Harris.

== Overview ==
The game was first with implementing, in a commercial game, several new concepts including much more picture-based/visual source material and character creation than usual. Like other works by Jonathan Tweet, the rules are very simple and flexible. It is also one of a few diceless role-playing games. The Fortune Deck works as a randomizer and inspirational tool, and the results obtained by it are highly subjective. In order to clarify their use, Tweet coined some new vocabulary to describe and formalize methods of gamemaster adjudication; these terms have been adopted by the wider tabletop RPG community. Tweet's adjudication terms are: Karma (making a decision based on character abilities, tactics, and the internal logic of a fictional situation), Drama (making a decision based on what moves the story along), and Fortune (letting a randomizer — drawing a card in Everway, but could also refer to rolling dice in other games — determine the outcome).

== First edition components ==
- 162-page Playing Guide
- 64-page Gamemastering Guide
- 14-page Guide to the Fortune Deck
- 90 Vision cards (each depicts a fantastic scene of some sort and is backed with a series of leading questions such as, "What does this person most enjoy?" or "What's the worst thing that could happen in this situation?")
- 36 Fortune cards (used for "divination" and action resolution, illustrated by Scott Kirschner and Jeff Miracola)
- four source cards
- six Questy cards
- 24 full-colour character sheets
- 16" x 11" Bonekeep map and 8" x 11" city map
- plastic trays to hold cards
- box

== Setting ==
The game has a fantasy setting of the multiverse type containing many different worlds, some of which differed from generic fantasy. It appears to have been heavily influenced by divinatory tarot, the four classical elements of ancient Greece, and world mythology.

The games revolve around heroes with the power of "spherewalking" traveling between worlds called "spheres". Spheres typically are composed of many "realms". Nearly all spheres are inhabited by humans, with mostly realistic physics. The theme is fantasy-oriented as opposed to science fictional. Advanced technology is explicitly forbidden in the character creation rules. The authors considered anthropology in terms of describing how the people of various spheres live, including many similarities across cultures. Some of these common features are entirely realistic (language, art), and others plainly related to the game's fantasy elements (magic, knowledge of the Fortune Deck).

The titular city of Everway is located in a realm called Roundwander, in the sphere called Fourcorner. Roundwander is the only realm in Fourcorner that is described. There is some detail on the sphere's main city, Everway, which contains a stone pyramid, a set of family-oriented guilds, and various exotic events related to the city's position as an inter-planar trading center. Several dozen other spheres are given one-sentence and a few are given page-long summaries, One is detailed as the setting for a sample adventure, "Journey to Stonekeep".

== Character creation ==
Character design is abstract and simple by most role-playing games' standards. Each character begins with twenty points to divide between four Element scores roughly equivalent to statistics for Strength (Fire), Perception (Water), Intelligence (Air) and Endurance (Earth). Scores range from 1 (pathetic) to 3 (average) to 10 (godlike), so a generic hero would have scores of 5. Each Element also has a specialty for which a character can get a 1-point bonus; e.g., a 5-Air hero with an Air specialty of "Writing" could write as though their Air score were 6. As a general rule a statistic of N is twice as capable as a level of N-1, where this makes sense. (A 5-Fire, 5-Earth hero can typically defeat two 4-Fire, 5-Earth enemies, or handily defeat a 3-Fire, 5-Earth character in foot race, but cannot necessarily run twice as fast even though speed is governed by Fire).

Each character also has Powers representing unusual abilities. These cost from zero to three or more points depending on whether they should be considered Frequent, Major (or even "Twice Major", for especially powerful abilities that significantly affect gameplay) and/or Versatile. For instance, a "Cat Familiar", a slightly intelligent cat, is arguably worth two points for being Frequent (usually around and often useful) and Versatile (able to scout, carry messages, and fight). A "Winning Smile" that makes the hero likable is worth zero points because of its trivial effect, while a "Charming Song" that inspires one emotion when played might be useful enough to count as Frequent (1 point). There is no strict rule for deciding what a Power is worth. Each hero can have one 0-point Power for free; additional Powers that would otherwise cost zero points instead cost one.

Magic is also abstract. A hero wanting access to magic, as opposed to a few specific Powers, must design their own magic system. This is done by choosing an Element for its basis, which affects its theme; e.g., Air is associated with speech and intellect and would be suitable for a system of spoken spells gained through study. The new Magic statistic has a 1–10 rating and point cost, and can be no higher than the Element on what it is based. The game's rules suggest listing examples of what the magic system can do at each power level, working these out with the GM. It is suggested that most characters do not need magic and that it is not suitable for new players.

Finally, each hero has personality traits based on the game's Fortune and Vision cards. Players are to choose one or more Vision cards and base a backstory on them, and to have three Fortune cards representing a Virtue, Fault, and Fate (a challenge they will face). These three cards can change to represent new phases in the hero's life. There is a list of suggested Motives for why the hero is adventuring, such as "Adversity" or "Wanderlust", but this feature has no gameplay effect.

Equipment such as weaponry is handled completely abstractly, with no specific rules for item cost, carrying capacity, or combat statistics. However, a particularly powerful piece of equipment—for example, a cloak that renders its wearer invisible for a brief period—may be treated as a Power that the hero must spend their initial element points on.

== The Fortune Deck ==
To decide what happens, the GM considers the rules of Karma (characters' abilities, tactics, logic), Drama (the needs of the plot), and Fortune, the result of a card drawn from the Fortune Deck. Many of these cards are based on the "Major Arcana" of tarot divination, such as "The Fool" and "Death", but the deck includes original cards such as "Drowning in Armor" and "Law". As with the Tarot deck there is symbolic art and each card has two complementary meanings when upright or reversed (while face up). The meanings are printed on the cards (e.g., "Protective Measures Turn Dangerous" vs. "True Prudence" for "Drowning in Armor") and explained more fully in the game's books. The rules are flexible about how often the GM should consult the Fortune Deck, whether the cards should be shown to players, and how much influence the draw should have—it is entirely acceptable for the GM to never use the deck at all, if she so desires. Though cards sometimes have obvious interpretations for the context in which they are drawn, the rules explain that sometimes they are best read simply as "a positive (or negative) result".

Although the Fortune Deck resembles (and can be used as) a fortune-telling device, Everway treats the Deck only as a storytelling device and an element of the fictional setting. It does not in any way endorse "real" fortune-telling or other supernatural concepts.

== Reception ==
In the December 1995 edition of Dragon (Issue 224), Rick Swan was surprised by Wizards of the Coast's choice of the very different Everway to enter the role-playing game market: "Everway is so far out of the mainstream, it’s barely recognizable as an RPG. For starters, it has no dice. It has no tables or charts. A deck of cards directs the flow of the game. Monster bashing, treasure hunting, dungeon crawling—bye-bye; Everway is pure narrative." Swan liked the "first class" production values of the components, but found the maps "lifeless". Swan was a big fan of the diceless system, saying, "It makes for a brisk game, and Everway, to its credit, plays at blinding speed." But Swan was concerned by how the game placed an unreasonable onus on the improvisational skills of both the gamemaster and the players. He concluded by giving the game an average rating of 4 out of 6.

Pyramid magazine reviewed Everway for and stated that "Jonathan Tweet has been responsible for some excellent, innovative games. He co-wrote Ars Magica, which has one of the best improvisational magic systems around. He was also responsible for Over the Edge, one of the most rules-light systems around. But he's gone one step further with his new game, Everway, which is probably the most innovative and playable systems to arrive on the market in years."

In his 2023 book Monsters, Aliens, and Holes in the Ground, RPG historian Stu Horvath found the cards used to resolve action were too ambiguous, noting, "For example, when characters who are evenly matched in the fire attribute are brawling, the GM draws a card: War, inverted, which indicates 'Effort Misspent' — but whose? This ambiguity is the main problem with Everway. It is gorgeous, ... it is intriguing, and it seems simple to dive into — but it's not."

== Reviews ==
- Realms of Fantasy
- Realms of Fantasy
