= The Black Death (video game) =

1983 video game

- Publisher: Krell Software
- Platform: Commodore 64
- Release: 1983

The Black Death is a video game published by Krell Software.

== Gameplay ==
The Black Death is a game in which a deadly epidemic is simulated.

== Reception ==
J. Robert Beck reviewed the game for Computer Gaming World, and stated that "The Black Death would be of interest to high school and college students studying epidemiology, as part of a general or population biology course. As a game it's a good example of a cooperative strategy problem.."
