= Julie Baroh =

American artist

Julie A. Baroh
- Born: August 4, 1970; Seattle, Washington
- Education: Cornish College of the Arts (BFA)
- Occupation: Artist
- Known for: Fantasy art
- Website: Fairy Artists; Julie Baroh Art

Julie Baroh (born August 4, 1970) is an American fantasy artist.

== Activities ==
Julie Baroh was born in Seattle, Washington on August 4, 1970. Majoring in sculpture and printmaking at the Cornish College of the Arts, she received her BFA in 1994. While still in college, she was recruited to work for the gaming company Wizards of the Coast as a freelance artist and published work in the company's magazines Scrye and The Duelist as well as illustrations for the collectible card game, Magic: The Gathering throughout the 1990s. After training in graphic and network applications, Baroh worked for Adobe Systems in the late 1990s, before leaving "to return to her fine arts roots".

In the first decade of the 21st century, she published work in Watercolor Fairies: A Step by Step Guide to Creating the Fairy World, The Art of Faery and the Big Book of Contemporary Illustration. Baroh was art director of the magazine Blood and Thunder for a year and a contributing layout designer for two years. She "specializes in whimsical animals and characters painted with a light touch, set in a fantasy realm: goblins and fairies, and mythological flora and fauna. In her fine art she pursues figuration and portraiture, using classical drawing techniques. Most of her work is done in watercolor or gouache."

== Personal life ==
Baroh is part owner of the artist collective former gallery Krab Jab Studio and the Seattle Illustrator's Collective. She currently runs a Seattle frame shop called Mainframe. As of 2019, Baroh and fellow Magic: The Gathering illustrator Brian Snoddy run a monthly videocast show called "The Yuki D and Jinx Show", featuring Seattle artists, musicians and media personalities.
