= Lisa Stevens =

CEO of Paizo Publishing

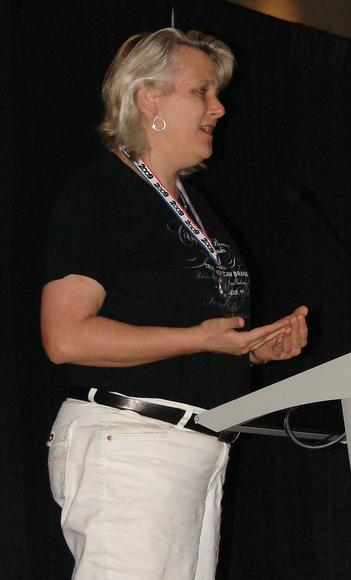
- Lisa Stevens on August 13, 2009, at the Gen Con ENnies awards show
- Born: Lisa Stevens; United States
- Occupation: Editor
- Writing career
- Language: English
- Genre: Role-playing games

Lisa Stevens is an American editor, CEO and founder of Paizo Publishing, and COO of Goblinworks, Inc. She began her career in games in the 1980s, working with Jonathan Tweet and Mark Rein-Hagen at Lion Rampant to help produce the tabletop roleplaying game Ars Magica. Stevens later worked at White Wolf and Wizards of the Coast before founding Paizo. She announced her gradual retirement from her role in June 2020.

== Education ==
Stevens attended Saint Olaf College, where she met game designers Jonathan Tweet and Mark Rein-Hagen. Stevens received an MBA from the University of Washington. After graduating from St. Olaf, she continued to spend time on campus running Dungeons & Dragons games.

== Career ==
Stevens joined Tweet and Rein-Hagen in the game company Lion Rampant, which published Ars Magica in 1987. Lion Rampant started as a volunteer organization, and they needed Stevens to volunteer at the company for her editorial experience. In 1990, Stevens pitched the idea of a merger to Rein-Hagen and Stewart Wieck, and as a result, Lion Rampant merged with White Wolf Publishing. Rein-Hagen, while on the road to GenCon 23 in 1990 with Stevens and Wieck, envisioned the ideas for what became Vampire: The Masquerade, which the new company published in 1991. After meeting Wizards of the Coast co-founder Rich Kaalaas at a GTS convention in March 1991 and again at GenCon 25, Stevens left White Wolf later that year to join Wizards, becoming the first full-time employee of the company. She was a vice president for Wizards when they published Magic: The Gathering in 1993, and she launched The Duelist magazine to support it. With her experience on Ars Magica while at Lion Rampant, she advised Wizards to acquire the game, which they did in January 1994. After the company purchased TSR, Stevens became the Brand Manager for both the RPGA and Greyhawk.

She is also an expert on Star Wars collectibles, and was the brand manager for Wizards' Star Wars Roleplaying Game.

Stevens left Wizards of the Coast in 2000, and made it known that she wanted to acquire the rights to their magazines if they became available. In May 2002, she formed Paizo Publishing, and is the CEO of the company. Wizards of the Coast cut their entire magazine department in 2002, so they licensed Dragon, Dungeon, and Star Wars Insider magazines to Stevens through Paizo.

In 2011, Paizo set up a company called Goblinworks, Inc. with Stevens as COO to handle the development of Pathfinder Online, a massively multiplayer online role-playing game.

On June 15, 2020, Paizo announced that Stevens was going to step down from daily operations in preparation for her retirement.
