= Mark Rein-Hagen =

American game designer

Mark Rein•Hagen
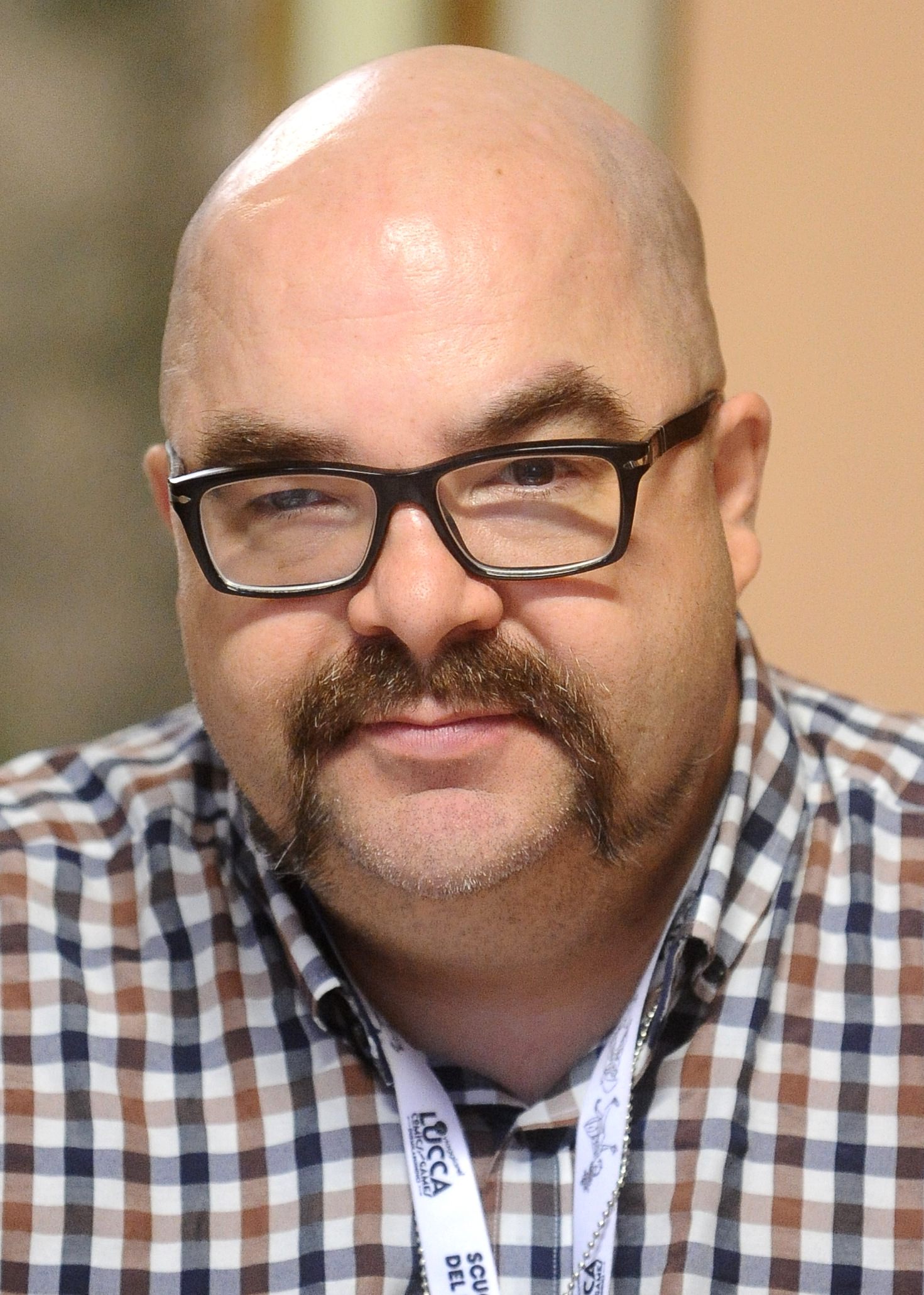
- Rein•Hagen in 2015
- Born: Mark Rein-Hagen; August 30, 1964 (age 62); Ohio, U.S.
- Occupation: Game designer
- Writing career
- Genre: Role-playing games

Mark Rein-Hagen (born 1964), stylized as Mark Rein•Hagen, is an American role-playing, card, video and board game designer best known as the creator of Vampire: The Masquerade and its associated World of Darkness games. Along with Jonathan Tweet, he is also one of the original two designers of Ars Magica.

== Career ==
The author writes for roleplaying games under the stylized name Mark Rein•Hagen.

=== Late 1980s: Lion Rampant and Ars Magica ===
Mark Rein•Hagen and Jonathan Tweet founded game publisher Lion Rampant in 1987 while attending Saint Olaf College; there they met Lisa Stevens who later joined the company. Rein•Hagen and Tweet designed Ars Magica over a period of nine months, publishing it in 1987. Rein•Hagen published Whimsy Cards, Ars Magica, and major Ars Magica supplements through Lion Rampant. The team worked with John Nephew and others who would become hobby game professionals.

Lion Rampant encountered financial difficulties in 1990, but after Stevens pitched a merger to Rein•Hagen and Stewart Wieck, they decided to merge White Wolf and Lion Rampant forming the new White Wolf Game Studio company, with Rein•Hagen and Wieck as co-owners. Of his experience at Lion Rampant, Rein•Hagen recalls:

My father told me when I started my first game company, Lion Rampant: "Mark, this company is going to fail, you are too young, inexperienced and poor to make it work. But, you are going to learn a lot, and next time you might just get it right." At the time I didn't believe him, I thought we could make it, but he was right, and because of his words, I never, ever gave up.

=== 1990s: Vampire: The Masquerade and The World of Darkness ===
Rein•Hagen was on the road with Wieck and Stevens to GenCon 23 in 1990, when he conceived of the game Vampire: The Masquerade which became his main project of 1991, and the new company was able to publish the game that same year. In 1992, Rein•Hagen wrote (with Robert Hatch and Bill Bridges) Werewolf: The Apocalypse, which was published through White Wolf.

Mage: The Ascension (1993) was based somewhat on a game that Rein•Hagen had thought of in 1989 as something like a "modern-day Ars Magica," although Mage was the first game in the World of Darkness in which he was not directly involved. Wraith: The Oblivion (1994) served as his return to designing the core World of Darkness games.

His next game, the fifth in the World of Darkness, was Changeling: The Dreaming, designed with Sam Chupp, Ian Lemke and Joshua Gabriel Timbrook. Rein•Hagen was developing a science-fiction game called Exile to be published in 1997 and owned by a non-profit known as the Null Foundation. White Wolf encountered financial difficulties between 1995 and 1996, which resulted in a falling out between Rein•Hagen, Wieck and the latter's brother Steve Wieck, so Rein•Hagen left White Wolf and took Exile with him. His Null Foundation released a draft of Exile for playtest in 1997, but the game was never fully published.

He served as a writer and producer for Kindred: The Embraced, a 1996 TV show loosely based on Vampire, produced by Aaron Spelling and shown on Fox TV. He was unhappy with the finished product because FOX's producers had a vision for the series he did not share, saying, "The show wasn't as good as it could have been, if they only had listened to me more." Kindred was cancelled after eight episodes, however, following the death of its star Mark Frankel, and any attempts to revive it were abandoned. Rein•Hagen continued to work in Hollywood for four years total, but disillusioned and fed up trying to make it as a writer, he decided to leave it behind.

=== 2000s ===
Rein•Hagen founded the company Atomaton, Inc. a few years later, which published his game Z-G in 2001, but Atomaton ceased operation in 2003.

Rein•Hagen, along with Ray Winninger and Stewart Wieck, made significant contributions to a game called D.O.A., designed by Greg Gorden of Mayfair Games in conjunction with White Wolf, but the game was never published. It was based on a concept called "Inferno" that Rein•Hagen had previously worked on during his time at Lion Rampant, in which the player characters were all dead characters from previous campaigns.

Rein•Hagen sold his shares in White Wolf in 2007 and left the gaming field. As of mid-2008, he was living in Tbilisi, Georgia, with his wife and child during the Russo-Georgian War (2008 South Ossetia War). Rein•Hagen was evacuated with other US citizens living in Georgia and founded the site sosgeorgia.org (now defunct) to help the international media track what was happening there.

=== 2010s ===
In 2012, Rein•Hagen worked on the card game Democracy, for his company Make Believe Games. This game was successfully funded by Kickstarter in November 2012. On February 4, 2014, Rein•Hagen released a statement citing poor health as the reason for his lack of communication and promising that backers would get their game. Commentators were extremely unhappy with the tone of the message and complained that Rein•Hagen's ill health had not affected his ability to work on other crowd-funded projects. Democracy shipped on November 18, 2014.

In a YouTube interview, Rein•Hagen spoke fondly of his former work on role-playing games and how he is working on a new role-playing game. Rein•Hagen elaborated on this role-playing game in March 2013, in another YouTube interview, describing some of the mechanics and speculating on a release date without naming it. In addition, he discussed his new game Succubus: The Reborn. The game had a Kickstarter campaign through Make-Believe Games that started on March 18, 2013, and failed to be funded on April 19.

The result of a June 2013 Kickstarter campaign, a horror RPG entitled I Am Zombie was released in 2015.

=== 2020s ===
Some of Rein•Hagen's current projects that have been in development around the 2020s include The World of Lostlorn, The Curse of BloodStone Isle, and FangKnight.

== Bibliography ==
=== Lion Rampant ===
Author

- Ars Magica First Edition (1987)
- Whimsy Cards (1987)
- The Bats of Mercille (only available at 1988 and 1989 Gen Con)
- Saga Pack (1988)
- The Stormrider (1989)
- Covenants (1989–1990)
- The Broken Covenant of Calebais (2004)

=== White Wolf ===
==== Author ====
- Vampire: The Masquerade Rulebook (1991)
- Vampire: The Masquerade's Book of the Damned
- Werewolf: The Apocalypse's Werewolf: The Apocalypse Second Edition
- Wraith: The Oblivion's The Face of Death
- Book of the Kindred (1996)
- Chicago Chronicles Volume 1
- Vampire: The Dark Ages Rulebook (1996)

==== Additional Design ====
- Vampire: The Dark Ages Rulebook (1996)

==== Additional Material ====
- The Book of Shadows: The Mage Players Guide (1994)

==== Design ====
- Vampire: The Masquerade Rulebook (1991)
- Book of the Kindred (1996)
- The Dark Ages Rulebook (1996)

==== Developer ====
- Vampire: The Masquerade Rulebook (1991)
- Vampire: The Masquerade's Book of the Damned
- Werewolf: The Apocalypse's Rite of Passage
- Chicago Chronicles Volume 1 (1996)
- Chicago Chronicles Volume 3 (1996)

==== Original Concept and Design ====
- Mage: The Ascension Second Edition (1995)
- Chicago Chronicles Volume 1 (1996)
