= Jonathan Tweet =

American game designer

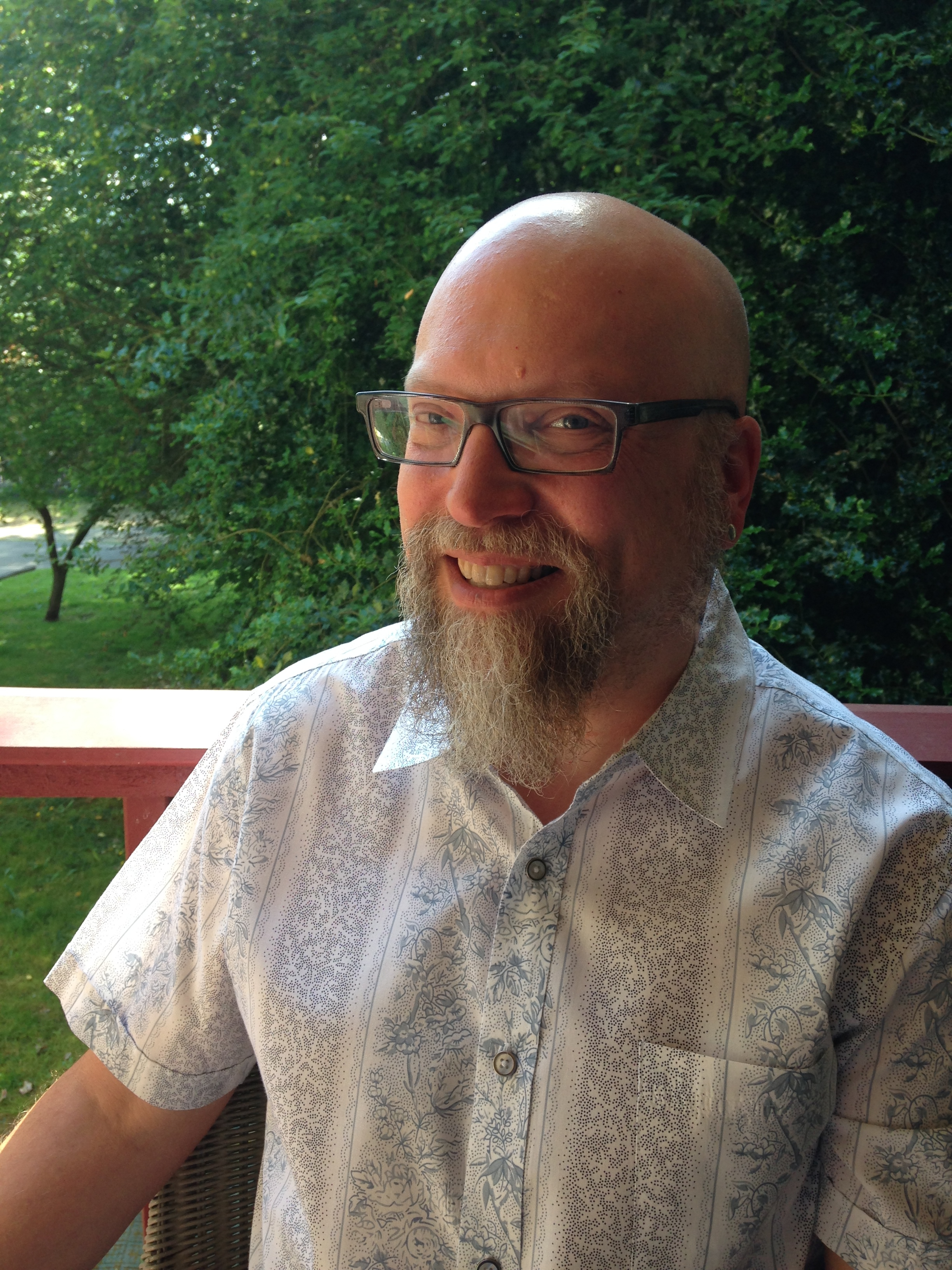
- Tweet in 2015
- Born: 1965 (age 60–61); Rock Island, Illinois, U.S.
- Education: St. Olaf College
- Occupations: Game designer, author, blogger, writer
- Spouse: Tracy (d. 2008)
- Children: 1
- Father: Roald Tweet
- Tweet in his own words recorded in July 2015
- Website: jonathantweet.com

Jonathan Tweet (born 1965) is an American game designer who has been involved in the development of the role-playing games Ars Magica, Everway, Over the Edge, Talislanta, the third edition of Dungeons & Dragons and 13th Age, as well as the collectible miniatures game Dreamblade. In 2015, Tweet released Grandmother Fish, a full-color, full-sized book about evolution aimed at preschoolers. In 2018, Tweet released Clades and Clades Prehistoric, two card games for children and adults which demonstrate the concept of a clade.

== Early life ==
Native to Rock Island, Illinois, Tweet is the son of Roald Tweet, an Augustana College professor emeritus and local historian, and Margaret Tweet. Jonathan Tweet started playing D&D in the 1970s, when his father gave him his first Dungeons & Dragons game. He then formed his own gaming group by recruiting classmates. Tweet graduated from Rock Island High School as class valedictorian in 1983. He majored in psychology and sociology at his parents' alma mater, St. Olaf College in Minnesota.

== Career ==
Jonathan Tweet and Mark Rein-Hagen founded Lion Rampant in 1987 while they were attending St. Olaf College. There, they also met Lisa Stevens who later joined the company. His article "Egyptian Magic for Call of Cthulhu" appeared in Different Worlds #47 (Fall 1987), the magazine's final issue. In 1987, Tweet and Rein-Hagen designed the game Ars Magica, a game centered around wizards in the Middle Ages. Tweet left Lion Rampant and briefly left the RPG industry in 1989 to begin a new career. In 1991, Tweet wrote Festival of the Damned, an adventure published by Atlas Games for Ars Magica. Tweet continued to run a game he created called "Al Amarja" for a group in Rock Island, Illinois, and wrote about the game in articles published in Alarums and Excursions; when John Nephew of Atlas Games (who worked with Tweet at Lion Rampant) read these articles, he wanted to publish the game, and the result was Over the Edge (1992), Atlas's first original game. His design on Over the Edge notably involved free-form rules and a subjective approach. Lisa Stevens recommended to Wizards of the Coast to have Tweet work freelance to revise the Talislanta rules for Wizards to publish, and to also write the first new adventure for their version of the game. In 1992, Tweet went on to write a revised version of the Talislanta Guidebook, and the adventure The Scent of the Beast. The following year, Tweet wrote the adventure Apocalypse for the Role Aids line by Mayfair Games. Nephew and Tweet also designed On the Edge (1994), a collectible card game based on Over the Edge. Tweet joined Wizards of the Coast as a full-time employee in June 1994, and brought about new product lines for the company beginning with Ars Magica, which Tweet recommended Wizards to acquire. He later designed Everway, which Wizards first published in 1995. After Wizards of the Coast briefly moved away from role-playing games, Tweet worked on Portal, a Magic: The Gathering set designed to help new players learn the game.

In 2000, Tweet was lead designer on the third edition of Dungeons & Dragons. Tweet, Monte Cook, and Skip Williams all contributed to the 3rd edition Player's Handbook, Dungeon Master's Guide, and Monster Manual, and then each designer wrote one of the books based on those contributions. In 2001, Tweet oversaw the Chainmail Miniatures Game design team, and Skaff Elias was responsible for the main design work while Chris Pramas created the game world. Tweet became the head of the miniatures group, and, in 2003, the Dungeons & Dragons Miniatures Game was the result of the work by Tweet, Elias and Rob Heinsoo. On December 2, 2008, Tweet was laid off from Wizards of the Coast.

13th Age, a d20 System RPG designed by Heinsoo and Tweet, was published by Pelgrane Press on August 3, 2013. The pre-release version was a nominee for the RPGGeek "Geek RPG of the Year 2013".

In 2015, Tweet published Grandmother Fish, a Kickstarter-funded book described as "the first book to teach evolution to preschoolers". While criticized by creationist organizations, it has been praised by science educators.

In 2018, Tweet, along with children's science illustrator Karen Lewis, released two card games, Clades and Clades Prehistoric. These animal matching games are intended to be used as tools to teach about evolution. Clades Solo, an app version that includes both prehistoric and modern animals, was released in 2019.

On June 1, 2019, the third edition of Over the Edge was released, with a new setting and new rules.

== Religious views ==
An atheist since grade school, Tweet has devoted much of his personal website to his views on religion, in particular on the historical Jesus. He also blogs about religion on the Secular Sunday School blog.

My plan was to demonstrate hell to be absurd... One Sunday, I screwed up my courage and announced to the teacher, "I don't believe in Hell."

The teacher responded with "I don't either."

With the initial foray against dogma a total failure, I called off the whole assault. Speaking my mind would have to wait for college.

— Jonathan Tweet

== Personal life ==
Tweet and his wife Tracy moved to Seattle, Washington, in 1994. Tracy died from multiple sclerosis in 2008. He continues to live in the Seattle area with his daughter.
