= Stewart Wieck =

American role-playing game designer (1968–2017)

- Born: May 10, 1968; Freeport, Illinois
- Died: June 22, 2017 (aged 49)
- Occupation: Game designer
- Notable work: Mage: The Ascension
- Relatives: Steve Wieck (brother)

Stewart Douglas Wieck (May 10, 1968 – June 22, 2017) was one of the founders of the publishing company White Wolf Publishing He was also one of the original writers of Mage: The Ascension.

== Career ==
Stewart Wieck was born in Freeport, Illinois, in 1968. He and his brother Steve Wieck had their first published work in 1986 with the adventure The Secret in the Swamp for Villains & Vigilantes from Fantasy Games Unlimited. Later that same year, while they were still in high school in Georgia, the brothers began self-publishing their own magazine, Arcanum; Stewart soon retitled the magazine as White Wolf, publishing the first issue in August 1986. The Wiecks were fans of Elric, and named their magazine after him.

The Wiecks had befriended the company Lion Rampant, and when that company encountered financial trouble, White Wolf and Lion Rampant made the decision to merge into the new White Wolf Game Studio, with Stewart Wieck and Mark Rein-Hagen as its co-owners. While Stewart was on a road trip to GenCon 23 in 1990 with Rein-Hagen and Lisa Stevens, Rein-Hagen envisioned Vampire: The Masquerade, which the new company published in 1991. Stewart co-created the World of Darkness and devised much of the mythology central to Vampire, but his most personal game design was Mage: The Ascension (1993).

Rein-Hagen was working on games for White Wolf, so Wieck took care of the business side of the company until he chose his brother Steve to be the new CEO of White Wolf in 1993. Stewart left his position as White Wolf Magazine editor in 1992. The company encountered economic problems between 1995 and 1996, which resulted in Rein-Hagen and the Wiecks having a falling out, with Rein-Hagen leaving White Wolf.

Stewart designed the game Long Live the King (2006). Stewart remained at White Wolf when Steve left in 2007 to take a seat on the board of directors of CCP Games. Stewart resigned from White Wolf in 2010, and created the company Nocturnal Games, which obtained the rights to Pendragon that White Wolf held. He co-designed the fantasy board game Darkling Plain, which uses 3D graphics created on smartphones. It was announced in 2013 by Nocturnal Media.

He co-edited the 1998 book The Essential World of Darkness, a collection of novels. Wieck is also an author of several novels and a number of short stories.

Wieck died June 22, 2017, at the age of 49.
