= Lion Rampant (game publisher) =

Tabletop role-playing game publisher

Lion Rampant was a tabletop game publishing company from 1987 to 1990. Originally based in Minnesota, Jonathan Tweet and Mark Rein-Hagen founded the company, and Lisa Stevens joined as the editor. John Nephew was also part of the team. In their first year, they debuted Whimsy Cards in August at GenCon. While not the "wizard game" which was their initial goal, it introduced freeform dramatic elements to a roleplaying session.

After their success at GenCon that summer, the team worked to publish Ars Magica, a roleplaying game about wizards in the Middle Ages, plus support material for the game. Despite not being a giant hit at first, in March 1988, Stevens had published a story about her Ars Magica character in Polyhedron Newszine and it attracted the attention of the RPGA. Later that year, the game won the "Gamer's Choice Award for Best New Role-Playing Game," which was presented to Lion Rampant at GenCon 1988.

In 1989, Tweet left Lion Rampant. In his place came Dan Fox who wanted to publish his own RPG. Fox proposed a deal that, if the company accepted to help him, he was willing to cover the debt the company accrued (despite the success of Ars Magica), with the condition Lion Rampant relocated to his home state of Georgia. While most of the team went through with the deal, John Nephew refused to leave Minnesota and started Atlas Games instead, a company that continued the success of Ars Magica. Upon their move to Georgia, the team at Lion Rampant found that Fox had lied about his wealth as well as owning the home he had promised to have them stay at.

That same year, Rein-Hagen shared his future ideas in a newsletter to explore the world of Ars Magica, also hinting at three titles of his World of Darkness series (which he would expand upon in the next decade).

In 1990, due to their ongoing financial issues and now being in close proximity of their base in Alabama, Lion Rampant merged with White Wolf Publishing, keeping the name White Wolf. One of their last accomplishments before their merge was a card game called The Challenge.
