= White Wolf (magazine) =

Game magazine published 1986–1995

- Issue 23 cover
- Publisher: White Wolf Publishing
- Founder: Stewart Wieck; Steve Wieck
- Founded: 1986
- First issue: August 1986
- Final issue Number: 1995; 57
- Language: English

White Wolf (later White Wolf Inphobia) was a game magazine, published by White Wolf Publishing from 1986 to 1995.

== History ==
While still in high school, Stewart Wieck and Steve Wieck decided to self-publish their own magazine, and Steve chose the name "White Wolf" after Elric of Melniboné; White Wolf #1 was published by their White Wolf Publishing in August 1986, and distributors began to order the magazine a few issues later as its print runs continued to increase. In 1990, Lion Rampant and White Wolf Publishing decided to merge into a new company that was simply called "White Wolf", and in an editorial in the magazine Stewart Weick explained that the magazine would still be independent even though the company was now involved in role-playing game publication. The name of the magazine was changed to White Wolf: Inphobia as of issue #50 (1995), but the magazine was ultimately cancelled with issue #57.

== Reception ==
White Wolf won the Origins Award for "Best Professional Adventure Gaming Magazine" in 1991, and again in 1992.

== Reviews ==
- Dragon #212
