= Vampire: The Requiem =

Tabletop role-playing game

- First edition cover
- Designers: Ari Marmell, C.A. Suleiman, Dean Shomshak; Justin Achilli, Philippe R. Boulle, Bill Bridges, Dean Burnham, Ken Cliffe, Michael Lee, Chris McDonough, Ethan Skemp, Richard Thomas, Mike Tinney, Stephan Wieck, Stewart Wieck, Fred Yelk, Aaron Voss, Pauline Benney
- Publishers: White Wolf Publishing; Onyx Path Publishing
- Publication: August 21, 2004 (1st edition); December 2013 (2nd edition)
- Genres: Modern Gothic
- Systems: Storytelling System

Vampire: The Requiem is a role-playing game published by White Wolf, Inc. for the Chronicles of Darkness setting, and the successor to the Vampire: The Masquerade line. Although it is an entirely new game, rather than a continuation of the previous editions, it uses many elements from the old game, including some of the clans and their powers. In the first edition, it required the World of Darkness core rulebook for use, and was released alongside it in August 2004.

In December 2013, the supplement Blood and Smoke: The Strix Chronicle was released, adding a default world setting and significantly revising certain aspects of the game to bring them in line with the upcoming changes to the core rules of the new World of Darkness. At GenCon 2014, it was announced that Blood and Smoke would be re-branded as Vampire: The Requiem, Second Edition, with a new cover, index, and very minor changes in November 2014. This release in both its forms was a stand-alone game, able to be played with no other books as references.

== History ==
Vampire: The Requiem was released by White Wolf Publishing on August 21, 2004, as a supplement to the simultaneously released book The World of Darkness, giving players rules for playing as vampires. It became the publisher's flagship title, and was in turn supplemented with its own line of supplements; the line developer was initially Justin Achilli, who was succeeded by Will Hindmarch in November 2004. The Resurrectionists (2007) by Hindmarch for Vampire: The Requiem was first adventure released in the Storytelling Adventure System. Greg Stolze was working on books for Vampire: The Requiem when he developed the One-Roll Engine dice system for Godlike (2002). In 2015, the "new" World of Darkness was rebranded as the Chronicles of Darkness by White Wolf Publishing, in an effort to further differentiate the setting from the Classic World of Darkness.

== Reception ==
Vampire: The Requiem was met with critical acclaim. Vampire: The Requiem won the 2005 Gold Ennie Award for "Best Supplement" and the Silver Ennie Award for "Best Interior Art".

== Reviews ==
- Coleção Dragão Brasil
- Pyramid
- Rebel Times #5 (reviews of the core book and City of the Damned: New Orleans expansion)
- Rebel Times #6 (overview of the entire system and a review of The Invictus expansion)
- Rebel Times #13 (review of the Lords over the Damned: Ventrue expansion)
- Rebel Times #16 (reviews of Kiss of the Succubus: Daeva and Savage and Macabre: Gangrel expansions)
- Rue Morgue #42

== Other media ==
New Line Cinema optioned the feature rights to Vampire: The Requiem in 2004, but to date, no script has emerged.

White Wolf released two board games for the Vampire: The Requiem setting: Prince of the City was released in October 2004, and Dark Influences was released in October 2006.

An original Vampire: The Requiem book trilogy was released in 2004, written by Greg Stolze and Lucien Soulban. In 2004, White Wolf conducted a novel writing competition, shortly before canceling their fiction line in 2005. One of the winners, The Silent Knife by David Nurenberg, was eventually published in December 2012.

== Related publications ==
- Kraig Blackwelder, Jacob Klünder, Matthew McFarland, and Will Hindmarch. Coteries (Vampire: The Requiem). White Wolf Publishing, 2004. ISBN 978-1588462510.
- Brian Campbell, Patrick O'Duffy, and Greg Stolze. Nomads (Vampire: The Requiem). White Wolf Publishing, 2004. ISBN 978-1588462527.
- Greg Stolze. Rites of the Dragon (Vampire: the Requiem). White Wolf Publishing, 2004. ISBN 978-1588462541.
- John Goff, Jess Heinig, Christopher Kobar, Brand Robins, and Chuck Wendig. Bloodlines: The Hidden (Vampire: The Requiem). White Wolf Publishing, 2005. ISBN 978-1588462558.
- Christopher Kobar, Alan Alexander, and Kraig Blackweld. Lancea Sanctum (Vampire: The Requiem). White Wolf Publishing, 2005. ISBN 978-1588462497.
- Ari Marmell and CA Suleiman. City of the Damned: New Orleans (Vampire: the Requiem). White Wolf Publishing, 2005. ISBN 978-1588462480.
- Chuck Wendig. Ghouls (Vampire The Requiem). White Wolf Publishing, 2005. ISBN 978-1588462565.
- Will Hindmarch, Christopher Kobar, Matt McFarland, and Greg Stolze. Ordo Dracul (Vampire: The Requiem). White Wolf Publishing, 2005. ISBN 1-58846-257-9.
- Christopher Kobar, Greg Stolze, Chuck Wendig, with Will Hindmarch. VII (Vampire: The Requiem). White Wolf Publishing, 2005. ISBN 1-58846-258-7
- The Invictus (October 2005)
- Wood Ingham, Christopher Kobar, Mur Lafferty, Dean Shomshak, Travis Stout, and Chuck Wendig. Bloodlines: The Legendary (Vampire: The Requiem). White Wolf Publishing, 2006. ISBN 1-58846-260-9.
- Justin Achilli, David Chart, Ray Fawkes, Will Hindmarch, Robin D. Laws, Ian Price, and Brand Robins. Requiem Chronicler's Guide (Vampire: The Requiem). White Wolf Publishing, 2006. ISBN 1-58846-261-7.
- Ray Fawkes, Matthew McFarland, Ian Price, and Greg Stolze. Carthians (Vampire: The Requiem). White Wolf Publishing, 2006. ISBN 1-58846-262-5.
- Ken Hite, Khaldoun Khelil, Robin D. Laws, Matthew McFarland, Dean Shomshak, and Travis Stout. Mythologies (Vampire: The Requiem). White Wolf Publishing, 2006. ISBN 1-58846-265-X.
- David Chart, Ray Fawkes, Greg Stolze, and Chuck Wendig. Circle of the Crone (Vampire: The Requiem). White Wolf Publishing, 2006. ISBN 1588462633.
- George Holochwost, Khaldoun Khelil, Ari Marmell, and CA Suleiman. Belial's Brood (Vampire: The Requiem). White Wolf Publishing, 2007. ISBN 978-1588462664.
- Will Hindmarch. The Resurrectionists. (Vampire: The Requiem). Storytelling Adventure System. White Wolf Publishing, 2007. ISBN 978-158846-272-5.
- Ray Fawkes, Christopher Kobar, Chuck Wendig, and Will Hindmarch. The Blood (Vampire: The Requiem). White Wolf Publishing, 2007. ISBN 978-1-58846-268-8.
- Roger William Barnes, Ty Bjarnason, Adriano Bompani, Ray Fawkes, Brian David Gibson, Misha James Handman, David Michael Hubbard, Paul Alexander Scokel, Sean Smith, Zachary Thomas Tyler, and Randy Ulch. Bloodlines: The Chosen (Vampire: The Requiem). White Wolf Publishing, 2007. ISBN 978-1-58846-269-5.
- Justin Achilli, Rose Bailey, Stephen DiPesa, Ray Fawkes, Will Hindmarch, Howard David Ingham, Robin Laws, Robert Vaughn, and Wendig. Damnation City (Vampire: The Requiem). White Wolf Publishing, 2007. ISBN 978-1-58846-267-1.
- Rose Bailey, David Chart, Ray Fawkes, Will Hindmarch, Howard David Ingham, Chuck Wendig, and Kenneth Hite. Requiem for Rome (Vampire: The Requiem). White Wolf Publishing, 2007. ISBN 978-1-58846-270-1.
- Russell Bailey, David Chart, Ray Fawkes, Howard David Ingham, and Chuck Wendig. Fall of The Camarilla (Vampire: The Requiem). Storytelling Adventure System. White Wolf Publishing, January 2008. ISBN 978-1-58846-271-8.
- Rose Bailey, Will Hindmarch, and Chuck Wendig. Lords Over the Damned: Ventrue (Vampire: The Requiem). White Wolf Publishing, 2008. ISBN 978-158846-273-2.
- Rose Bailey and Benjamin Baugh. Kiss of the Succubus: Daeva (Vampire: The Requiem). Storytelling Adventure System. White Wolf Publishing, May 2008. ISBN 978-1-58846-352-4.
- Russell Bailey and Chuck Wendig. Savage and Macabre: Gangrel (Vampire: The Requiem). White Wolf Publishing, 2008. ISBN 978-1588463531.
- Howard Ingham and Christopher Lee Simmons. Shadows in the Dark: Mekhet (Vampire: The Requiem). White Wolf Publishing, 2009. ISBN 978-1588462749.
- Russell Bailey, Benjamin Baugh, Max Brooks, Dave Brookshaw, and Jennifer Lawrence. Night Horrors: Immortal Sinners (Vampire: The Requiem). White Wolf Publishing, 2009. ISBN 978-1588464491.
- Jess Hartley, Wood Ingham, Orrin Loria, and Chuck Wendig. The Beast that Haunts the Blood: Nosferatu (Vampire: The Requiem). White Wolf Publishing, 2009. ISBN 978-1-58846-351-7.
- Bethany Culp, Sebastian Freeman, Howard Ingham, Myranda Kalis, Joe Rixman, P. Alexander Scokel, Chuck Wendig, and Filamena Young. Ancient Mysteries (Vampire: The Requiem). White Wolf Publishing, 2009. ISBN 978-1-58846-357-9.
- Bethany Culp, Sebastian Freeman, Howard Ingham, Myranda Kalis, Joe Rixman, P. Alexander Scokel, Chuck Wendig, and Filamena Young. Ancient Bloodlines (Vampire: The Requiem). White Wolf Publishing, 2009. ISBN 978-1-58846-364-7.
- Benjamin Baugh, Steve Darlington, Wood Ingham, Becky Lowe, Matthew McFarland, Alexander Scokel, Christopher Lee Simmons, and Chuck Wendig. Night Horrors: The Wicked Dead (Vampire: The Requiem). White Wolf Publishing, 2009. ISBN 978-1-58846-374-6.
- David A. Hill Jr. and Chuck Wendig. Invite Only (Vampire: The Requiem). White Wolf Publishing, 2010. ISBN 1588463923.
