= Jeff Tidball =

American game designer

- Occupation: Game designer

Jeff Tidball is a game designer who has worked primarily on role-playing games.

== Biography ==
Jeff Tidball was a college student when he began working full-time at Atlas Games when the company expanded after the success of On the Edge (1994). John Nephew and Tidball were the only staff that Atlas retained after the collectible card game field crashed in 1996. Tidball became the Director of Creative Development and soon began developing the next role-playing game from Atlas Games, Ars Magica, which Atlas had acquired from Wizards of the Coast. Tidball also became the line developer for Ars Magica, and the Feng Shui line developer as well. Tidball designed Cults Across America (1998) which was one of the board and card game releases from Atlas.

Tidball left Atlas Games in 2000 to take a Master of Fine Arts film script-writing program available at the University of Southern California. Tidball later went to work at Last Unicorn Games, and Tidball and Jess Heinig were the only remaining employees by January 2004 in the Last Unicorn Games role-playing game division of Decipher Games, so Decipher shut down Last Unicorn Games and laid them off. Tidball designed the Cthulhu 500 card game for Atlas. Tidball worked as the line developer for Decipher's The Lord of the Rings Roleplaying Game. Tidball designed Pieces of Eight (2006), a game by using coins as a game mechanic which Atlas published.

Will Hindmarch and Tidball later started a small press company called Gameplaywright. Tidball subsequently worked as the senior developer and editor for the board and card game departments at Fantasy Flight Games, before returning to Atlas Games on a contract basis as chief operating officer. He has also continued to write in the roleplaying industry, notably the massive Eternal Lies campaign he wrote with Hindmarch for Pelgrane Press's Trail of Cthulhu RPG.

Tidball wrote The White Box: A Game Design Toolkit (2017, Atlas Games) with Jeremy Holcomb in partnership with Atlas Games and Gameplaywright to make use of their mutual backgrounds in writing and teaching about game design.

Tidball lives with his wife and sons in the Twin Cities area.

== Notable works ==
Notable Works	Role	Year
Ars Magica	Line Developer	1996
Cults Across America	Designer	1998
The Lord of the Rings Roleplaying Game	Line Developer	2002–2004
Cthulhu 500	Designer	2004
Pieces of Eight	Designer	2006
Beowulf: The Movie Boardgame	Developer	2007
Things We Think About Games	Co-Author	2008
Horus Heresy	Designer and Producer	2010
The Bones: Us And Our Dice	Co-Author	2010
Ecotopia	Designer and Writer	2011
Skullgirls	Writer	2011
League of Legends	Writer	2011
Dragon Age: Set 2	Developer and Co-author	2011
Mercante	Designer	2012
Doctor Who: Time Clash	Designer	2016
The White Box: A Game Design Workshop-In-A-Box	Designer and Writer	2017
