= Northern Crown (roleplaying game) =

- Northern Crown: New World Adventures
- Designers: Doug Anderson
- Publishers: Atlas Games
- Publication: August 2005
- Genres: alternate history, alternate reality, fantasy
- Systems: d20 System, Dungeons & Dragons variant

Northern Crown is a d20 System role-playing game of alternate history and fantasy, set in a magical version of seventeenth-century North America. Introducing elements of European and American legend and lore, as well as numerous elements common to the worlds of Dungeons & Dragons and related fantasy settings, the world of Northern Crown is more inspired by the real world than directly based upon it. NPCs are based on characters from throughout North American history, with characters from later periods being incarnated under revised identities and new names (the most prominent example being the inclusion of Benjamin Franklin as Chiron Franklyn).

== History ==
Although Atlas Games had ceased publication of its d20 lines in 2004, Atlas liked Northern Crown enough to publish it in 2005.

== Books ==
The setting of Northern Crown is initially detailed in two hardcovers: Northern Crown: New World Adventures, and Northern Crown: Gazetteer. The former introduces the setting, briefly discussing the world, and providing full rules for character creation and advancement; the latter expands upon the world in detail, as well as presenting NPCs, new monsters, and detailed information on inventions and magic items. While only the New World Adventures hardcover is actually required for play in the setting, the additional rules and information presented in the Gazetteer allow for expedited preparation, particularly in regards to inventions and other technology.

== Continents ==
The continents of Northern Crown are primarily modelled after those found in the real world as understood by European explorers and cartographers of the time. Thus, much of all continents save Uropa remains uncharted, and the question of whether an Australian analogue exists remains a mystery.

=== Northern Crown ===
Named for a constellation visible in the night sky over the continent, Northern Crown is the focus of the eponymous campaign setting. Mapped from Jamaica in the south up past real-world Newfoundland, and from the Atlantic coast to the westernmost shores of the Great Lakes, it is a mostly uncharted continent presently dominated by the many native nations and tribes (known as First Ones in the setting's jargon), with a few developing colonial nations and states along the eastern and southern coast.

Nations

- Carolingia
- The Commonwealth
- Five Nations
- Naumkeag
- New Sweden
- Nieu Nederlands
- Nouvelle France
- Nueva España
- Sophia
- Vermont
- Vinland
- Woodland Confederacy

=== Uropa ===
The setting's European analogue. As details on Uropa are provided mainly for the purpose of creating characters on the continent of Northern Crown, information is limited. However, brief descriptions are given for the most influential nations and powers, and some facts may be drawn from these. As in Northern Crown, Christianity has a much more tenuous hold on the beliefs and laws of Uropa than in real-world Europe. Several nations—including Albion, Éire, Scotia, and Lithuania—remain devoted to the Old Ways, the polytheistic faiths and traditions of witchcraft indigenous to each nation.

=== Nyambe ===
Detailed in the previously published Nyambe: African Adventures campaign setting, Nyambe is the origin of the Cimarron culture found in Northern Crown. As with Africa in the real world, Uropan slavers favor Nyambe, and the several nations in Northern Crown which still use slavery as a source of labor ensure that this practice remains profitable.

=== Other Lands ===
Referred to as the Far East Asia is not mentioned by name, although Cathay (China), Xipangu (Japan), and the Moghul Empire and subcontinent of Indi (India) are briefly discussed. More detail is given to the Ottoman Empire, the extent of which includes parts of Uropa and Nyambe.

The continent of Southern Cross, analogous to South America, is mentioned even more briefly, given little detail. Just as with Northern Crown, it is named for a notable constellation visible in the night sky of the southern hemisphere.

== Character Creation ==
Reflecting the unique setting, Northern Crown introduces several new rules related to character creation, including detailing a number of human cultures, classes, and prestige classes.

=== Cultures ===
Unlike the core Dungeons & Dragons game, which offers the player a choice of one of several different races, it is assumed that all characters in Northern Crown are- for the most part -human. As a substitute for racial benefits, several distinct cultures are offered; each drawn from either the Uropans, Nyambans, or First Ones.

First Ones

- Cherokee
- Mohawk
- Ojibwa
- Shawnee

Nyamban

- Cimarrons

Uropan

- Albians
- Buccaneers
- Carolignians
- Commonwealthers
- Coureurs
- Espaniards
- Français
- Kelts
- Nederlanders
- Sophians
- Vinlanders
- Witchlings

=== Classes ===
Due to the style and mood of the setting, several new character classes have been introduced, some of them replacing core classes: the Agent, Natural Philosopher, Rake, Raider, Scout, Soldier, and Witch are detailed, while the Barbarian, Fighter, Monk, Ranger, and Rogue are described as being inappropriate for the setting.

== Cultural references ==
- The islands of Laputa and Brobdingnag (here spelled as Brobdignag) from Gulliver's Travels are mentioned among rumors of the wonders to be found in the uncharted west of Northern Crown.
- Many parallels between elements in The Tales of Alvin Maker and the world of Northern Crown may be drawn, such as the inclusion of knacks, which in the game setting are presented as psionic abilities gained through taking a feat, and the presence of a smaller analogue of the United States.
