= Darin Eblom =

Game designer

- Occupation: Game designer

Darin "Woody" Eblom is a game designer who has worked primarily on role-playing games.

== Career ==
Darin "Woody" Eblom was one of the Minnesota locals who joined Lion Rampant after the company was started. Eblom and John Nephew left Lion Rampant in 1990 when the company moved to Georgia as they did not want to move away from Minnesota. John Nephew founded Atlas Games in 1990 with some help from other former employees of Lion Rampant including Nicole Lindroos and Eblom. Eblom became one of the new full-time employees of Atlas Games after the success of On the Edge (1994). Eblom founded the organization Tundra Sales, to help small press role-playing game publishers with sales and service.
