= Weather the Cuckoo Likes =

Weather the Cuckoo Likes is a 1994 role-playing supplement for Over the Edge published by Atlas Games.

== Contents ==
Weather the Cuckoo Likes is a supplement in which the Cut-Ups oppose the Control Addicts.

== Reception ==
Spike Y. Jones reviewed Weather the Cuckoo Likes in White Wolf #47 (Sept., 1994), rating it a 4.5 out of 5 and stated that "Weather The Cuckoo Likes should be useful for any OTE GM, as well as for any GM adapting OTE concepts to other conspiracy games, like CORPS or GURPS Illuminati."

== Reviews ==
- The Familiar (Issue 1 - Dec 1994)
- Interactive Fantasy (Issue 2 - 1994)
