= The White Box =

Book series by Jeremy Holcomb and Jeff Tidball

The White Box: A Game Design Toolkit or The White Box Essays is a set of books about tabletop game design by Jeremy Holcomb and Jeff Tidball and published by Atlas Games in 2017.

== Development ==
Jeremy Holcomb was professor of game design at the DigiPen Institute of Technology, when he wrote his thoughts and ideas with his years of experience of game design as The White Box Essays. Jeff Tidball was the co-founder of Gameplaywright and chief operating officer for Atlas Games, and he convinced Holcomb to publish his idea through Kickstarter in April 2017. Holcomb and Tidball created The White Box in partnership with Atlas Games and Gameplaywright to make use of their mutual backgrounds in writing and teaching about game design as an affordable cohesive product. Holcomb and Tidball went on the Modifier podcast with Meghan Dornbrock to talk about The White Box.

== Contents ==
The White Box was intended as a game design workshop to present information and tools to aspiring game designers. It comes as a collection of essays about board game design in a box containing materials such as dice, colored cubes, cardboard chits, and multicolor wooden meeple tokens.

== Reception ==
Anthony J. Bushner in his 2020 PhD thesis about hobbyist board game design wrote that "One of the most thorough and interesting game design handbooks reviewed for this project was The White Box Essays [...] The 10.5-page chapter on rulebooks comes relatively early in the book and is the only reviewed chapter that speaks to the implicit/explicit rule dichotomy that Salen and Zimmerman cover in detail in Rules of Play as an important part of game manual style. This chapter gives a thorough explanation of each of the crucial sections of a standard rulebook and attends to the order in which those sections should appear to make the rulebook easy to understand for a new reader. Though this chapter does not cover in any significant detail how to conduct usability testing on the manual, this is covered in later chapters."
