= Airwave =

Airwave(s) may refer to:

== Telecommunication ==
- Radio wave, a type of electromagnetic radiation
  - Radio communication, use of radio waves for communication
- Airwave (communications network), a mobile communications network dedicated for use by emergency services in Great Britain
- AirWave Wireless, a Wi-Fi hotspot provider, acquired by Aruba Networks in 2008

== Characters ==
- Airwave (G.I. Joe), a character in the G.I. Joe: A Real American Hero universe
- Air Wave, three DC Comics superheroes
- Airwave, a Decepticon in the Transformers Micromasters subline

== Music ==
- Airwaves (Badfinger album), 1979
  - Airwaves (Badfinger song)
- "Airwaves", a song by Kraftwerk from Radio-Activity
- Airwaves (Ike & Tina Turner album), 1978
- "Airwave", a song by Dutch trance group Rank 1
- "Airwaves" (Brett Kissel song), from Pick Me Up
- "Airwaves" (Thomas Dolby song), 1982
- Airwaves, a Welsh 1970s pop-rock band led by musician and songwriter John David
- Iceland Airwaves, an annual music festival in Reykjavik
- Angels & Airwaves, an American space rock band
- Laurent Véronnez, aka Airwave, Belgian trance music composer (French page)
- "Air Waves", a song in Deltarune.

== Other uses ==
- Airwaves (gum), a brand of chewing gum sold by Wrigley's
- Airwaves (TV series), a 1986–1990 Canadian sitcom
- Honda Airwave, a 2005–2010 subcompact car
- Airwave, a fictional airline in Microsoft Flight Simulator X
- Airwave Gliders, an Austrian aircraft manufacturer
- Airwave (horse), a British Thoroughbred racehorse
- Airwaves (Over the Edge), a set of three role-playing game adventures
