= New Faces (disambiguation) =

New Faces was a British talent show, broadcast from 1973 to 1988.

New Faces can also refer to:

== Stage shows, films and television shows ==
- New Faces (1934 revue), a Broadway musical revue
- New Faces of 1936, a Broadway musical revue
- New Faces of 1943, a Broadway musical revue
- New Faces of 1948, an off-Broadway musical revue
- New Faces of 1952, a Broadway musical revue
- New Faces (film), a 1954 American film based on the 1952 musical revue and directed by Harry Horner and John Beal
- New Faces of 1956, a Broadway musical revue
- New Faces of 1962, a Broadway musical revue
- New Faces (Australian TV series), an Australian talent show, broadcast from 1963 to 1985 and 1992-1993, first as Kevin Dennis Auditions, then Kevin Dennis New Faces, lastly as New Faces
- New Faces of 1966, an American musical revue
- New Faces of 1968, a Broadway musical revue

== Music ==
- New Faces (album), a 1985 album by trumpeter Dizzy Gillespie
- New Faces (band), an American band formed in 2006

== Other ==
- New Faces (Over the Edge), a 1992 adventure for the role-playing game Over the Edge
