= Jeremy Holcomb =

American game design professor

- Born: 1975; Nashville, Tennessee, U.S.
- Education: University of Washington, BA in Communications. Chicago School of Professional Psychology, MA in Behavioral Economics, Magna cum laude.
- Occupation: Professor
- Employer: DigiPen Institute of Technology
- Notable work: Speak Up, Speak Out, and Be Heard: How to Protest and Make it Count (Loompanics, 2003), ISBN 978-1559502382; Anachronism; Crossroads cooperative games for Christian families (2011); The Duke (2013 Catalyst Games); Phase (2016); The White Box: A Game Design Workshop in a box (2017 Atlas Games), ISBN 978-1589781825; What Is Game Design? (2023), ISBN 979-8987698303; Shinies or Death (2024)
- Awards: 2005 Origins Award for Best Card Game, Anachronism; 2006 Inquest Award for Best Card Game, Anachronism; 2014 Mensa Select, The Duke
- Website: jeremymakesgames.com

Jeremy Holcomb is an American game designer, writer, and professor. He was born in Nashville, Tennessee in 1975, moving to the Pacific Northwest early in life. He received an undergraduate degree in communications from the University of Washington, then moved to New York City in the late 1990s to write advertising copy. He returned to Seattle, Washington in 2000 and began self-publishing board and card games. He joined DigiPen Institute of Technology in 2012 and now serves as a program director and professor of design.

== Career ==
Holcomb began designing games professionally while in New York, where he ran numerous live action roleplaying games mostly set in the World of Darkness mythos. Holcomb returned to Seattle he worked as a writer and activist, publishing the book Speak Up, Speak Out and Be Heard: How to Protest and Make It Count through Loompanics, covering topics such as marches, pickets, boycotts, letter writing campaigns, building signs, what to do when arrested, how to get media attention, causes, goals, methods, logistics, networking, and organizing. His break into game design came with the design and publication of Anachronism, where he served as a designer, writer, and line developer. He then designed numerous games for both the hobby and mass markets. His hobby-market games include The Duke (2014, Catalyst Games) and Phase (2016, Alderac Entertainment Group). His mass-market games include Crossroads cooperative games for Christian Families (Crossroads LLC, 2011).

Holcomb began teaching game design by offering courses at the ASUW Experimental College at the University of Washington. He then joined DigiPen Institute of Technology in 2012. Holcomb has taught a class on the fundamentals of board game design at DigiPen where the students were able to create non-electronic games. Holcomb was also the director of the game design program at DigiPen. He has published works to support game design education, including The White Box: A Game Design Toolkit (2017, Atlas Games), which he wrote with Jeff Tidball in partnership with Atlas Games and Gameplaywright to make use of their mutual backgrounds in writing and teaching about game design. He also wrote What Is Game Design?, a textbook focused on video game design fundamentals. He has taught game design workshops around the world, including the University of Arizona microcampus in Lima, Peru, China University of Science and Technology in Taipei, and Gamers8 in Riyadh, Saudi Arabia. His work focuses on game systems, player experience design and accessibility.

His 2024 work Shinies or Death introduced the concept of what Holcomb calls "bouncing games", games with no fixed owner which transfer to the winner after play.
