= Cloaks (Over the Edge) =

1998 role-playing game supplement

Cloaks is a 1998 role-playing game supplement for Over the Edge published by Atlas Games.

== Contents ==
Cloaks is a sourcebook with information intended for secret agents. Its name is drawn for the 'Marjian slang term for spies. Since Al Amarja has more conspiracies than any other country on earth, it is chock-a-block with Companies and the Cloaks and Frills that work for them.

Chapter 0 (Uses For This Book): A preface by the author.

Chapter 1 (How to Do It): Adventure seeds, plot hooks, and motivations involving the various previously detailed conspiracies.

Chapter 2 (Yesterday's Hero): A campaign that will eventually drag in all the conspiracies. A powerful mutant human is killing random people on The Edge. The characters get caught up in what's happening and will eventually have to get directly involved.

Chapter 3 (Club St. Augustine): A popular nightclub for the rich and jaded that is a hotspot for cloaks.

Chapter 4 (Agents): Sample non-player characters representing each of the factions.

Chapter 5 (Frills): An assortment of non-player characters who have been manipulated or duped into working for a conspiracy.

Chapter 6 (Toys): Fringe equipment for use by Cloaks.

Chapter 7 (Shivs): A list of espionage-related Fringe powers, called "shivs" in Cloak slang.

Appendix (Dossiers): Handouts in the form of Al-Amarjan government files. They detail some of the non-player characters mentioned in the book. Their information is off a bit, which could make the reader underestimate their target. One dossier is for a person whose stats are not listed in the book, so the game Master can do what they want with the information.

== Reception ==
The reviewer from the online second volume of Pyramid stated that "if you do have the other material, Cloaks is one of the most intriguing books in this long running series. Tweet has taken some major stylistic leaps in this book. Cross-reference Cloaks with the other key titles and the GM is going to have a field day."

== Reviews ==
- Shadis #48 (June, 1998)
- Backstab #9
