= En Route =

En route, Enroute or EnRoute may refer to:

== Arts and media ==
- Air Canada enRoute Film Festival, a former film festival
- En Route, a 2011 album by Orquesta Aragón
- En Route (album), a 1995 album by Moebius and Plank
- En Route (Atlas Games), a 2001 role-playing game adventure published by Atlas Games
- En Route (film), a 2004 German movie directed by Jan Krüger
- enRoute (magazine), Air Canada's in-flight magazine
- En Route (novel), an 1895 novel by Joris-Karl Huysmans
- "V Put" ("En Route"), a 1954 Soviet song by Vasili Solovyov-Sedoi, Les Chœurs De L'Armée Soviétique

== Other uses ==
- EnRoute (app), an app charting the carbon footprint of activities and transport, created by Angela Busheska
- enRoute (credit card), Air Canada's credit card division before 1992, when it was sold to Diners Club
- En-route chart, in aeronautics
