= EdgeWork =

American game magazine

Cover art of EdgeWork No. 1, 1994

EdgeWork was a small press magazine published by Atlas Games starting in 1994 that was devoted to the role-playing game Over the Edge.

== Publication history ==
EdgeWork was a fanzine for the surreal role-playing game Over the Edge. It was first published in 1994, and lasted for four issues. The last issue also appeared in 1994.

== Reception ==
In the May 1994 edition of Dragon (Issue #205), Rick Swan reviewed the first issue, and admitted "I’m a sucker for fanzines. What they lack in polish, they usually make up in spunk, and EdgeWork, devoted to the eccentric Over the Edge game, is no exception." He concluded, "EdgeWork may have the editorial budget of a school newspaper, but for OTE enthusiasts, it’s more essential than the New York Times."

== Reviews ==
- Australian Realms #29
