= Spammers (card game) =

Card game

Spammers is a card game that was published by Atlas Games in 1998. The retail boxed set contained 110 cards, 125 counters, and one die.

== Gameplay ==
Spammers is a card game in which players compete to perform the most successful scams.

== Reception ==
The reviewer from the online second volume of Pyramid stated that "that leaves the guys at Atlas with the problem of how do you top something like Lunch Money? Guess what folks, it looks like they just did it with another proudly iconoclastic and non-collectible card game called Spammers."

== Reviews ==
- Shadis #47 (April 1998)
