= Wildest Dreams: The Sourcebook of Nightmare =

Role-playing supplement

Wildest Dreams: The Sourcebook of Nightmare is a 1993 role-playing supplement for Over the Edge published by Atlas Games.

== Contents ==
Wildest Dreams: The Sourcebook of Nightmare is a supplement in which the designer-drug called Nightmare is detailed, along with the scenario "Kill John Doe".

== Publication history ==
Shannon Appelcline noted that John Tynes and Greg Stolze "had met while working together on Wildest Dreams (1993), an early supplement for Over the Edge" before collaborating on Unknown Armies (1999).

== Reception ==
Spike Y. Jones reviewed Wildest Dreams: The Sourcebook of Nightmare in White Wolf #46 (Aug., 1994), rating it a 3 out of 5 and stated that "Paying [the price] for one adventure and a rather restricted sourcebook may be a bit much. Still, if the subjects covered interest you, you should have no complaints."
