= Pierced Heart =

Pierced Heart is a 1996 novel published by Atlas Games.

== Plot summary ==
Pierced Heart is a novel in which a murder mystery is blended with philosophical inquiry and subtle science fiction. Set in the surreal Mediterranean city of Al Amarja, the story follows Alex, a woman grappling with the death of her sister and the strange, often unsettling forces surrounding her quest for meaning. The novel offers a literary exploration of themes like divinity, suicide, family, and existential purpose. The narrative includes intense combat scenes and a mysterious drug called "Communion," which may offer a direct connection to God. As Alex navigates her journey, she is drawn into a web of characters whose relationships evolve and unravel.

== Publication history ==
Pierced Heart, Robin Laws' debut novel published by Atlas Games, uses the setting for the Over the Edge roleplaying game.

Pierced Heart was responsible for bringing Laws to the attention of Bill Jemas at Marvel Comics, which led to his run on Iron Man.

== Reception ==
Pyramid magazine reviewed Pierced Heart and stated that "It's not a gaming novel. Throw that idea right out. Gaming novels have genre-based characters, situation-oriented plots and copious references to arcane mechanics. Pierced Heart just happens to be set in the same world as a game, and just happens to be written by an author of game books. Got that? You certainly don't have to know the On/Over the Edge universe in order to enjoy it."
