= John Nephew =

American game designer

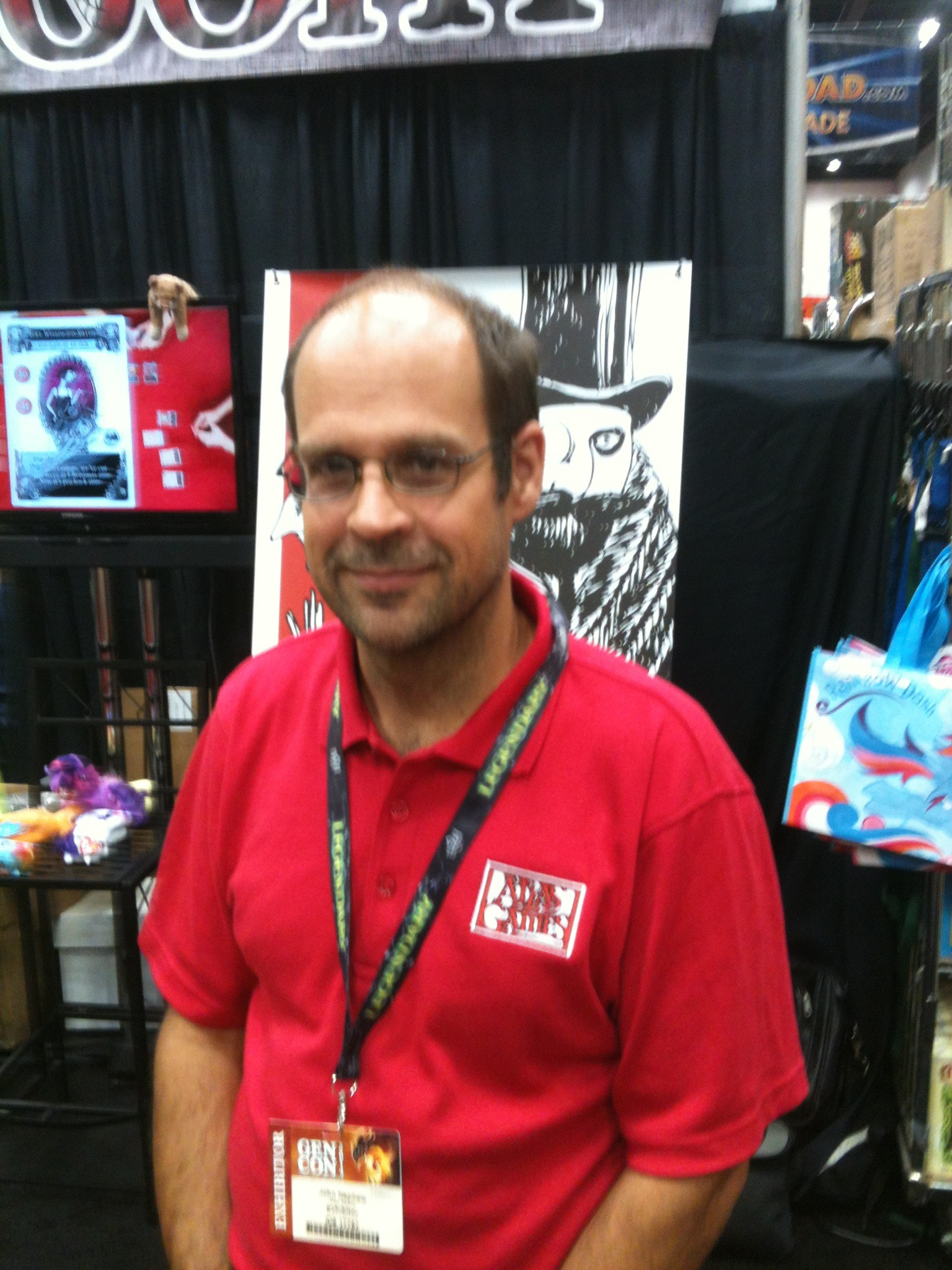
- Occupation: Game designer

John A. Nephew is an American game designer, who has worked primarily on role-playing games.

== Career ==
John Nephew started writing Dungeons & Dragons material freelance for TSR in 1986 while he was still in high school, initially writing material for Dragon and Dungeon magazines. While writing for the magazines, TSR invited Nephew to contribute to projects including Kara-Tur: The Eastern Realms (1988) and Castle Greyhawk (1988), and then the first book he wrote on his own, Tall Tales of the Wee Folk (1989). Nephew went to Carleton College in Minnesota, where he met the team from Lion Rampant. Nephew was one of the Minnesota locals who joined Lion Rampant after Jonathan Tweet and Mark Rein Hagen founded the company in 1987 while they were attending St. Olaf College, the traditional rival of Carleton. Nephew joined the company in 1988, and his roles at the company during his tenure included acquisitions director, editor, and he served briefly as president.

Nephew left Lion Rampant in 1990 when the company moved to Georgia as he did not want to leave Minnesota. Nephew had purchased a photocopier for Lion Rampant to use, and he made a deal with the company allowing them to take the photocopier with them, while they gave Nephew a license to publish Ars Magica supplements; Nephew then started Atlas Games with assistance from Lion Rampant friends including Nicole Lindroos and Darin Eblom. In addition to supplements for Ars Magica, Underground, and Cyberpunk, Nephew published Tweet's Over the Edge and supplements, including Wildest Dreams which first brought together Robin Laws, Greg Stolze, and John Tynes near the beginnings of their careers in the RPG industry.

Nephew and Tweet designed On the Edge (1994), a collectible card game based on the role-playing game Over the Edge by Tweet. Nephew and Jeff Tidball were the only staff that Atlas did not lay off when the CCG industry crashed in 1996, to pay the final printing bills for On the Edge. Atlas Games made an offer for Everway and Ars Magica when Wizards of the Coast shut down its existing role-playing game lines in 1995 and put them up for bid; Nephew withdrew the Everway bid on February 12, 1996, and Wizards announced on March 6 that it had sold Ars Magica to Atlas Games. In addition to his major roles, managing Atlas Games and editing its publications, Nephew wrote supplements for Ars Magica, Over the Edge, and d20 over the next few years.

== Personal life ==
Nephew won a seat on the Maplewood, Minnesota City Council in 2007. His wife Michelle Nephew gave birth to twins in 2009.

Nephew is a plastics recycling advocate.
