= Will Hindmarch =

Designer of role-playing games

- Occupation: Game designer

Will Hindmarch is a game designer, who has worked primarily on role-playing games.

== Career ==
Atlas Games hired Will Hindmarch following the success of their d20 lines. Atlas published some final d20 products in 2004 and when they cancelled the remainder of their d20 line, Hindmarch left Atlas. Hindmarch edited a new Vampire product for White Wolf soon after the release of Vampire: The Requiem (2004). Hindmarch wrote The Resurrectionists (2007) for Vampire: The Requiem, which was the first product to use the Storytelling Adventure System was . Hindmarch and Jeff Tidball formed a new small press called Gameplaywright.

He was the lead designer on Till the Last Gasp (2023), a 2-player dueling game published by Critical Role's imprint Darrington Press. Linda Codega, for Io9, commented that Till the Last Gasp blends "the strengths of the main designers" as Hindmarch's "tactical, number-forward design mentality meshes well with Alex Roberts' established success in designing immersive two-player games".

== Project: Dark ==
In 2014, Hindmarch created and funded a Kickstarter campaign for a role-playing game (RPG) titled Project: Dark. However, as of November 2024, the project has not been completed, with a lack of updates on the Kickstarter page has remained inactive, with no posts from Hindmarch since 2022.
