= Canadas =

Historical geopolitical term

Provinces of Upper Canada and Lower Canada
- 1791–1841
- Union Flag (1801 version)
- Anthem: "God Save the King/Queen"
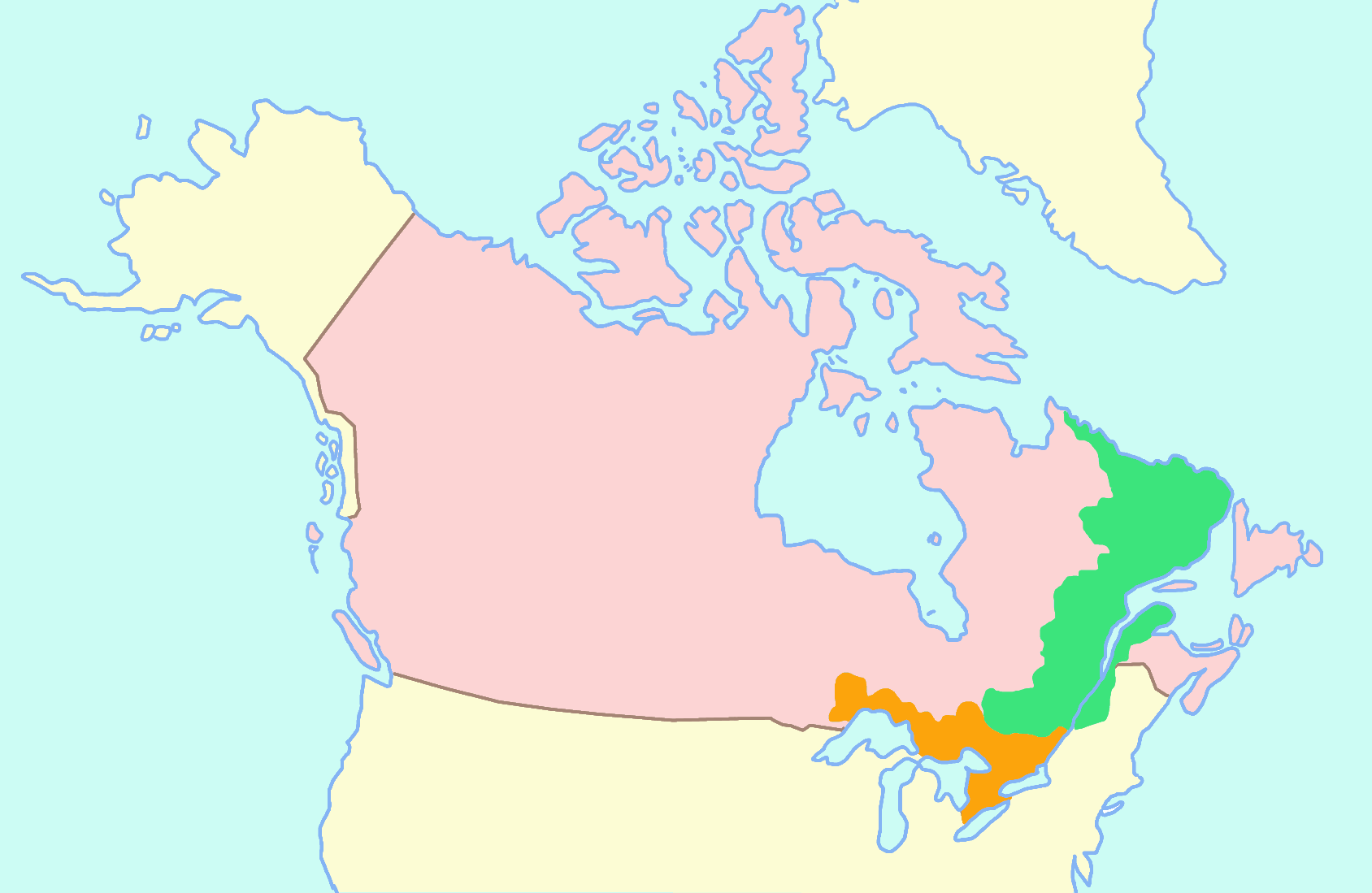
- The Canadas, Upper Canada (orange) and Lower Canada (green) prior to 1809, with contemporary Canada in pink surrounding it
- History
  - Established: 1791
  - Disestablished: 1841
Preceded by	Succeeded by
Colony of Quebec	Province of Canada

The Canadas is the collective name for the provinces of Lower Canada and Upper Canada, two historical British colonies in present-day Canada. The two colonies were formed in 1791, when the British Parliament passed the Constitutional Act, splitting the colonial Province of Quebec into two separate colonies. The Ottawa River formed the border between Lower and Upper Canada.

The Canadas were merged into a single entity in 1841, shortly after Lord Durham published his Report on the Affairs of British North America. His report held several recommendations, most notably union of the Canadas. Acting on his recommendation, the British Parliament passed the Act of Union 1840, which went into effect in 1841, uniting the Canadas into the Province of Canada.

The terms Lower and Upper refer to the colony's position relative to the headwaters of the St. Lawrence River.

- Lower Canada covered the southeastern portion of the present-day province of Quebec and (until 1809) the Labrador region of Newfoundland and Labrador.
- Upper Canada covered what is now the southern portion of the province of Ontario and the lands bordering Georgian Bay and Lake Superior.

== History ==
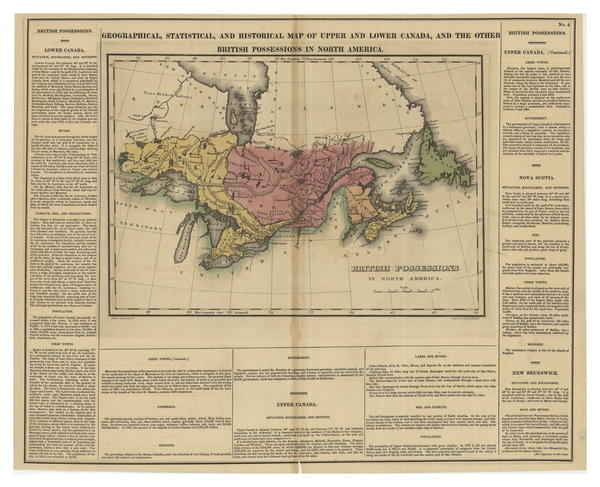
Geographical, statistical, and historical map of Upper and Lower Canada, and the other British Possessions in North America (1823)

The two colonies were created in 1791 with the passage of the Constitutional Act 1791. As a result of the influx of Loyalists from the American Revolutionary War, the Province of Quebec was divided into two new colonies, consisting of Lower and Upper Canada. The creation of Upper Canada was in response to the influx of United Empire Loyalist settlers, who desired a colonial administration modelled under British institutions and common law, especially British laws of land tenure. Conversely, Lower Canada maintained most of the French Canadian institutions guaranteed under the Quebec Act, such as the French civil law system.

In 1838 Lord Durham was sent to the colonies to examine the causes for rebellion in the Canadas. His report on the colonies recommended that the two colonies should be united, and the introduction of responsible government. The British Parliament would eventually act on the former suggestion, with the passage of the Act of Union 1840. The Act of Union went into force in 1841, and saw the Canadas united into the Province of Canada. However, the Act did not establish responsible government, which was not introduced until 1848.

== See also ==
- The Californias
- The Carolinas
- The Dakotas
- The Floridas
- Rhodesia (region)
- The Virginias
