= Dungeoneer (game) =

Board game

- Vault of the Fiends
- Designer: Thomas Denmark
- Publisher: Citizen Games, Atlas Games
- Players: 1-4
- Age range: 12 and up
- Website: www.atlas-games.com

Dungeoneer is a non-collectible card game designed by Thomas Denmark and released by Atlas Games. Denmark is also credited for many of the illustrations of the cards. During each game turn, players alternatively take on the role of the "dungeon lord", who unleashes monsters and traps on his opponents, and of the adventurer who explores the dungeon trying to solve his quests. The game is won either by a dungeon lord who defeats all of his opponents, or by an adventurer who successfully solves three quests.

== The sets in the series ==
The first set, simply called "Dungeoneer" was originally released by Citizen Games, but was later released by Atlas games, with some significant changes (both in the looks and in the game mechanics) and a new name, "Tomb of the Lich Lord", in November 2003. "Tomb of the Lich Lord" is much of a classic dungeon crawl, a crypt filled with undead and classical sword-and-sorcery archetypes. The first set has been followed by several others, each one with new cards and a different background:Vault of the Fiends (2003), Haunted Woods of Malthorin (2004), Den of the Wererats (2004), Dragons of the Forsaken Desert (2005), Realm of the Ice Witch (2005), Call of the Lich Lord (2006), and Wrath of the Serpent Goddess (2007).

== Gameplay ==
In a Dungeoneer game, players are involved in an RPG-like adventure, in which they have to explore an area, face monsters and other threats, and solve perilous quests, taking on the role of one of six heroes with asymmetrical abilities. Each set consists of 55 or 110 cards of different types: white-backed "map" cards, used to create the dungeon/wilderness area; green-backed "hero" cards, which serve as the players' character sheet; purple-backed "quest" cards, which define the specific goals of each player; and brown-backed "adventure" cards, representing spells, treasure, monsters and threats.

You win the game when as a hero you complete 3 Quests, such as destroying an evil laboratory or rescuing a princess. The other method of winning is to defeat all the other heroes.

Turn order for each player includes:

- The Reset Phase where all temporary cards are discarded, and all traps and doors are relocked
- The Dungeonlord Phase, in which you may play Monsters, Traps and Banes on opponents
- Build Phase, in which the dungeon grows by laying down a Map card
- The Hero Phase lets you move through the dungeon collecting Glory and Peril resources as you travel. You may spend an extra movement to lay another Map card. This is when you play Boons and Treasures for yourself. This is also when you are able to make an attempt to complete a Quest
- Discard/Draw Phase in which you discard one card and draw up to five cards

The dungeon is created by the laying of Map cards. The quests necessary to win the game are fulfilled on specific Map cards. Combat consists of each player involved rolling one six-sided die and adding either the Magic or Melee score of the monster and the hero it is attacking.

Traps, doors, and other hazards are overcome by rolling equal to or above the objects Threat.
