= Bob Brynildson =

American retailer (1957–2026)

- Born: January 22, 1957; Hudson, Wisconsin, U.S.
- Died: October 8, 2026 (aged 69); North St. Paul, U.S.
- Education: University of Minnesota
- Occupation: Retailer

Robert Guy Brynildson (January 22, 1957 – October 8, 2026) was an American retailer. He was the owner of Source Comics and Games in Roseville, Minnesota.

== Early life and education ==
Robert Guy Brynildson was born in Hudson, Wisconsin, January 22, 1957, to Gerald and Barbara (Lovaas) Brynildson. Brynildson grew up in Isle, Minnesota, near Mille Lacs Lake, where he developed a love of reading, and learned fishing, hunting, swimming, camping and how to drive a boat. In 1969, his family moved to Cannon Falls, Minnesota, and Brynildson began studying military history and pursued gaming, becoming one of the original organizers of Dungeons & Dragons in Cannon Falls, and he held tournaments in the family basement. He graduated from Cannon Falls High School in 1975 and attended the University of Minnesota beginning in September 1975. There he met Kim Fluharty, whom he married on September 2, 1978. Brynildson completed one more year at the U of M and entered the US Marine Corps from 1981 to 1984 and reached the rank of Sergeant. His first son was born while he was stationed at Camp Lejeune in North Carolina. The family returned to Minnesota after his tour of duty and their second son was born.

== Career ==
Jerry Corrick and Bob Brynildson were the owners of a game store in the Twin Cities called Source Comics & Games. Atlas Games did not have enough funds to publish On the Edge (1994), so they partnered with Corrick and Brynildson to form a corporation called Trident, Inc. and were able to publish the game. Eventually Atlas would be subsumed into Trident; Brynildson, Corrick, and Source continued to provide support to Atlas using their experience and perspective in business.

== Death ==
Brynildson died from lung cancer at his home in North St. Paul on October 8, 2026, at the age of 69.
