= The Duke (board game) =

Abstract strategy board game

- Manufacturers: Catalyst Game Labs
- Designers: Jeremy Holcomb & Stephen McLaughlin
- Years active: 2013–present
- Genres: Board game Abstract strategy game
- Players: 2
- Setup time: ~1 minute
- Playing time: <1 hour
- Chance: Minimal – the order in which tiles are drawn and brought into play
- Skills: Strategy, tactics

The Duke is a two-player abstract strategy board game played on a square-tiled gameboard, with 36 squares arranged in a 6×6 grid. The game has been compared to chess and chess variants, while retaining notable differences in unit movement and overall gameplay.

== Gameplay ==
Each player begins game with three pieces: two footmen and one eponymous duke tile. Each piece, a flat, wooden tile (known as troop tiles) has its movement options graphically portrayed on its two sides, giving it alternating movement options based upon which side of the piece is currently facing upwards. Pieces are moved to either an unoccupied square or one occupied by an opponent's piece, which is then captured and removed from play. Each turn, players must move a piece, place another piece on the board, and use any special powers if applicable. The objective in a standard game is to capture the opponent's duke, by first placing the duke into guard, a condition paralleling check in chess.

The Duke is designed with game expansions and allots for special powers beyond those provided in the main game. It comes with extra pieces (known as terrain pieces) which are used to modify gameplay and blank tiles which can be used to create unique, customized pieces.

== Awards ==
The Duke was a 2014 Mensa Select winner and was nominated for the Dice Tower Gaming Awards 2013 ‘Best Two Player Game’.
