= David Chart =

British-born Japanese role-playing game designer

- Occupation: Game designer

David Chart is a game designer who has worked primarily on role-playing games.

== Career ==
David Chart authored Akrasia: Thief of Time (2001), the first in Eden Studios's "Eden Odyssey" series of adventures. Chart became the line editor for Ars Magica at Atlas Games in 2002. Chart oversaw the Ars Magica fifth edition rules which were published in late 2004. Chart used "open calls" to expand the number of Ars Magica writers, allowing anyone to submit drafts for review.

== Awards ==
In 2005, Ars Magica fifth edition (for which Chart was the developer) won the Origins Award for best role-playing game and the Gold ENnie Award for best rules.
