= Dakotas =

Region in the United States

Coordinates: 46°N 100°W

The Dakotas
- Region
- North and South Dakota in light green
- Country: United States of America
- States: North Dakota; South Dakota
- Largest city: Sioux Falls
- Largest metropolitan area: Sioux Falls
- Admission to Union: November 2, 1889 (both North and South Dakota)

Area
  - Total: 147,816 sq mi (382,840 km^{2})

Population (2024)
  - Total: 1,721,237
  - Density: 11.6445/sq mi (4.49595/km^{2})
- Demonym: Dakotan

The Dakotas, also known as simply Dakota, is a collective term for the U.S. states of North Dakota and South Dakota. It has been used historically to describe the Dakota Territory, and is still used for the collective heritage, culture, geography, fauna, sociology, economy, and cuisine of the two states.

== Etymology ==
The name "Dakota" refers to the Dakota people.

== History ==
The territory now known as the Dakotas includes a large portion of the ancestral land of Native American tribes, in particular various tribes of Sioux such as the Dakota people, also known as the Santee Sioux. The United States government stakes its claim to the land through the Louisiana Purchase and Rupert's Land acquisition. The region historically involved a complex series of conflicts between the U.S. government and Native American tribes (and among themselves).

The region was part of the Minnesota and Nebraska territories until 1861. Dakota Territory initially included parts of present-day Montana, Nebraska and Wyoming. The fall of 1861 resulted in a poor harvest and was followed by a harsh winter, leading to extreme hardship for the Dakota in the region. Desperate for food and money, they were denied loans by local traders. A series of raids in the spring of 1862 ultimately resulted in Dakota War of 1862 between the U.S. government and the Dakota people. The U.S. won the war, the aftermath which included a mass hanging of 38 people on December 26, 1862, the largest mass execution in U.S. history. The remaining Santee Dakota people were exiled by the U.S. government to the Dakota Territory.

The end of the war did not solve the conflicts between Native Americans and the Americans. Fighting would continue, for example along the Bozeman Trail, until the Treaty of Fort Laramie in 1868. The treaty established the Great Sioux Reservation and "designated the Black Hills as 'unceded Indian Territory' for the exclusive use of native peoples." The subsequent discovery of gold in the Black Hills in 1874 by George Armstrong Custer's Black Hills Expedition, would cause a gold rush and the U.S. to violate the treaty. The Indian Appropriations Act of 1876 went into effect on August 15, 1876. This was referred to as "sell or starve" by the Native Americans and led to the Great Sioux War of 1876. The conflict between the Sioux and miners and the U.S. forces backing them would culminate in the Battle of the Little Bighorn, also known as "Custer's Last Stand", the most significant battle of the war. Despite being a Sioux victory, Battle of the Little Bighorn preceded the Agreement of 1877 which took away the Black Hills and forced Native Americans onto reservations (see Black Hills land claim) and left the Sioux with little means to address their grievances.

Before he left office, President Cleveland signed a bill on February 22, 1889, splitting the Dakota Territory along the modern borders. This bill was ratified by Congress, and President Harrison signed the paper work to create the US states of North Dakota and South Dakota on November 2, 1889, deliberately signing such that it was unknown which was officially created first.

The debate over the land within the Dakotas, specifically the Black Hills, is unsettled. The Sioux in 1920 began a legal battle over their ancestral lands within the US system of justice. Sixty years later, the US Supreme Court upheld in 1980's United States v. Sioux Nation of Indians case that tribal land was illegally taken from the Sioux and ruled they deserved financial compensation. The Sioux Nation has refused the offer because the land was "never for sale".

== Geography ==
The Dakotas have a total area of 147,878 square miles (383,177 square kilometers), which is larger than present-day Montana.

The Dakotas are within the Midwestern United States, with the western portion in the High Plains. The PBS miniseries New Perspectives on the West noted historically important areas within the Dakotas, including the Black Hills, the town of Deadwood, Fort Buford, Standing Rock Sioux Reservation and Wounded Knee. The Upper Missouri River and the Upper Missouri River Valley are important geological features in the area, as well.

Both of the Dakotas have humid continental climate, with warm to hot summers and cold to even subarctic temperatures in winter. Due to the difference in circle of latitude, temperatures differ by degrees between the southern and northern areas, even inside the respective states.

== Demographics ==
Historical population
Census	Pop.	Note	%±
1860	4,837		—
1870	14,181		193.2%
1880	135,177		853.2%
1890	539,583		299.2%
1900	720,716		33.6%
1910	1,160,944		61.1%
1920	1,283,419		10.5%
1930	1,373,694		7.0%
1940	1,284,896		−6.5%
1950	1,272,376		−1.0%
1960	1,312,960		3.2%
1970	1,283,268		−2.3%
1980	1,343,485		4.7%
1990	1,334,804		−0.6%
2000	1,397,044		4.7%
2010	1,486,771		6.4%
2020	1,665,761		12.0%
2024 (est.)	1,721,237		3.3%
Source: 1910–2020

The two states combined have a population of 1,670,324, slightly less than Idaho, ranking at 39th place. The two states also have a population density of 9.8 per sq. mi (3.8 per km^{2}).

The area is mostly inhabited by people of Northern European origin. 44.9% of the population are of German ancestry, 21.8% of Norwegian, and 9.6% are of Irish heritage.

=== Main cities ===
The following are the top twenty-two most populous cities in The Dakotas. Pierre, South Dakota, and Bismarck, North Dakota, are the respective state capitals.

1. Sioux Falls, South Dakota: 202,078
2. Fargo, North Dakota: 131,444
3. Rapid City, South Dakota: 78,824
4. Bismarck, North Dakota: 74,445
5. Grand Forks, North Dakota: 58,692
6. Minot, North Dakota: 47,759
7. West Fargo, North Dakota: 39,985
8. Aberdeen, South Dakota: 28,210
9. Williston, North Dakota: 27,029
10. Dickinson, North Dakota: 25,679
11. Mandan, North Dakota: 24,206
12. Brookings, South Dakota: 23,993
13. Watertown, South Dakota: 23,019
14. Jamestown, North Dakota: 15,849
15. Mitchell, South Dakota: 15,659
16. Yankton, South Dakota: 15,411
17. Huron, South Dakota: 14,263
18. Pierre, South Dakota: 14,091
19. Spearfish, South Dakota: 12,193
20. Box Elder, South Dakota: 11,746
21. Vermillion, South Dakota: 11,695
22. Brandon, South Dakota: 11,048

== See also ==
- Californias
- Canadas
- Carolinas
- Floridas
- Virginias
