= The Tide of Years =

2001 role-playing game

The Tide of Years is a 2001 role-playing game adventure published by Atlas Games.

== Plot summary ==
The Tide of Years is an adventure in which the player characters need to find a sacred object and return it to the temple of the time god.

== Reviews ==
- Pyramid
- Backstab
- Campaign Magazine (Issue 1 - Aug/Sep 2001)
- Legions Realm Monthly (Issue 13 - Oct 2003)
- Anduin (Issue 77 - Oct 2002)
- Realms of Fantasy
