= In the Belly of the Beast (Atlas Games) =

Role-playing game adventure

In the Belly of the Beast is a 2001 role-playing game adventure published by Atlas Games.

== Plot summary ==
In the Belly of the Beast is an adventure in which a noble family seeks the player characters to help them against a conspiracy trying to ruin them.

== Reviews ==
- Pyramid
- Backstab
- Legions Realm Monthly (Issue 15)
