= Cthulhu 500 =

Motor racing-themed card game

Cthulhu 500 is a motor racing-themed card game designed by Jeff Tidball based on H. P. Lovecraft's Cthulhu Mythos. The game was released by Atlas Games at Gen Con 2004.

== Object of the game ==
Players compete by racing Cthulhoid vehicles (such as the Sports Cthutility Vehicle or the Car of Cthulhu) and take turns either upgrading the vehicle or pit crew, or attempting to overtake the car in front. Once a player reaches the front of the pack, that player may attempt to overtake the rearmost vehicle and thereby gain a lap. The player with the most laps when the checkered flag card is drawn wins; in case of a tie, the front-most of the tying vehicles wins. The last-place finisher is the loser.

== Reception ==
The reviewer from the online second volume of Pyramid stated that "Attention, racing fans. Roll down your tailgates, break out the Space Mead, and get ready for high-speed thrills. Atlas Games is waving the green flag -- at least, it looks like a flag -- and the Cthulhu 500 is underway."

The game won the Origins Awards for Best Traditional Card Game of 2004 and Gamers' Choice 2004.
