= The Floridas =

Historical region in the southeastern United States

Coordinates: 30°N 85°W

British West Florida and British East Florida (pink) from a 1767 map. Southern East Florida is not shown.

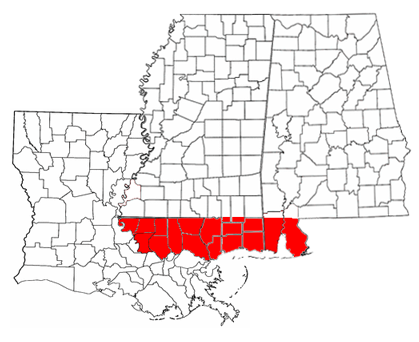
The Baton Rouge and Mobile Districts of Spanish West Florida (red), claimed by the United States, spanned parts of three later states. The Spanish province also included part of the present state of Florida.

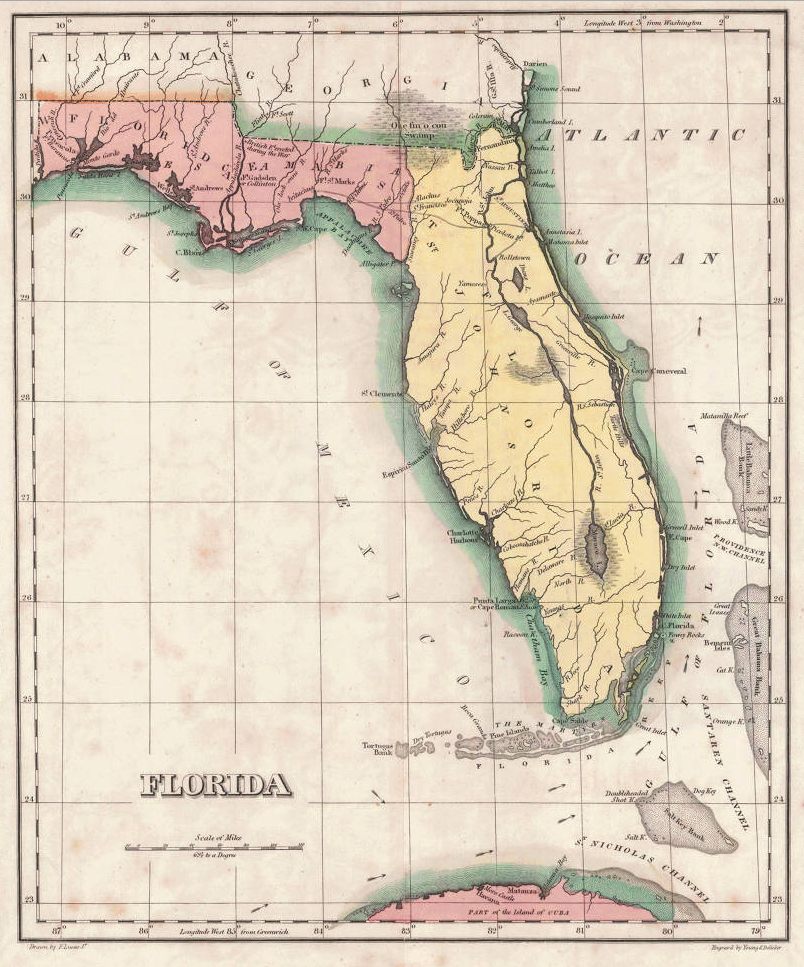
Under Spanish rule, Florida was divided by the natural separation of the Suwannee River into West Florida and East Florida. (map: Carey & Lea, 1822)

The Floridas (Spanish: Las Floridas) was a region now in the southeastern United States comprising the historical colonies of East Florida and West Florida. They were created when Great Britain obtained Florida in 1763 (see British Florida), and found it so awkward in geography that it split the territory in two. The borders of East and West Florida varied. In 1783, when Spain acquired West Florida and re-acquired East Florida from Great Britain through the Peace of Paris (1783), the eastern British boundary of West Florida was the Apalachicola River, but Spain in 1785 moved it eastward to the Suwannee River. The purpose was to transfer the military post at San Marcos de Apalachee (now St. Mark's) and the surrounding district from East Florida to West Florida. From 1810 to 1813, the United States extended piecemeal control over the part of West Florida that comprised the modern-day Gulf coasts of Alabama and Mississippi and the Florida Parishes of Louisiana. After the ratification of the Adams–Onís Treaty in 1821 the United States combined East Florida and what had been the remaining Spanish-controlled rump of West Florida into the territory that comprises modern-day Florida.

== See also ==
- The Californias
- The Canadas
- The Carolinas
- The Dakotas
- The Virginias
