= Airwaves (Over the Edge) =

Role-playing game adventure

Airwaves is a set of three role-playing game adventures published by Atlas Games in 1993 for the Over the Edge role-playing game system.

== Description ==
Airwaves is a 16-page booklet of three adventures for the Over the Edge role-playing game system:

- Airwaves, written by Rembert Parker, describes the alien infiltration of a newly established television station on the island of Al Amarja.
- House Call, written by Dustin Browder, describes a pocket universe with intelligent fungi and Nazi shoe salesmen.
- Unauthorized Broadcast, written by Robin Laws, introduces a drug that grants its users strange mental powers.

== Reception ==
In the October 1993 edition of Dragon (Issue 198), Rick Swan commented that "Occasionally, good things do come in small packages" and each of these adventures "boasts writing and art that any major publisher would envy." Swan did point out that the adventures were only basic sketches, and would require a lot of work to flesh out. But he concluded that "considering the raw material, ambitious do-it-yourselfers should have a field day."
