= New Faces (Over the Edge) =

New Faces is a 1992 role-playing adventure for Over the Edge published by Atlas Games.

== Plot summary ==
New Faces is an adventure in which material for gamemasters is provided.

== Reception ==
Sam Chupp reviewed Over the Edge in White Wolf #37 (July/Aug., 1993), rating it a 3 out of 5 and stated that "The art, design, writing and layout of this tiny supplement is of the same quality as the rulebook. It's just small. You needn't bother purchasing it if you aren't running OTE full time; you really won't miss the information otherwise."

== Reviews ==
- The Last Province (Issue 2 - Dec 1992)
