= Tall Tales of the Wee Folk =

Tabletop role-playing game supplement for Dungeons & Dragons

- Author: John Nephew
- Genre: Role-playing game
- Publisher: TSR
- Publication date: 1989
- Pages: 64

Tall Tales of the Wee Folk is an accessory for the Dungeons & Dragons fantasy role-playing game.

== Contents ==
Tall Tales of the Wee Folk is a supplement that describes magical woodland creatures such as brownies, sprites, dryads, leprechauns, centaurs, pixies, fauns, hsiao, pookas, sidhe, treants, wood imps, and woodrakes, and outlines rules for playing them as player characters (PCs).

Tall Tales of the Wee Folk describes the woodland realm of the Dreamland, which is ruled by the fairy king, Oberon. The Dreamland is home to many creatures drawn from diverse mythological sources, from Celtic sidhe to ancient Greek centaurs and fauns. Other creatures covered include the hsiao (large, intelligent owls) and pookas (shape-changing pranksters). Each of the races is introduced and described by game characters who detail how the races live, what they look like, how they dress, and their cultural outlooks and aspirations; this is followed by game-orientated information that lists experience levels and relevant special abilities. Creatures in PC1 start the game with negative experience points, with balanced relative experience-level costs such that no race is more powerful than another. The adventure book features six short one or two page adventures covering levels 1–26, and a longer fifteen page adventure titled "The Lost Seneschal," which is for 1st-3rd level characters.

== Publication history ==
PC1 Tall Tales of the Wee Folk was written by John Nephew and published by TSR in 1989 as a sixty-four page book with an outer folder. The package also includes a thirty-two page adventure booklet, and features editing by Gary L. Thomas, a cover illustration by Keith Parkinson, and interior illustrations by Valerie Valusek.

== Reception ==
Dave Hughes reviewed Creature Crucible: Tall Tales of the Wee Folk for Games International magazine, and gave it 4 stars out of 5, and stated that "Some of its reference material is fascinating, drawing on Welsh, Irish and Shakespearian legend for inspiration (it has a comprehensive glossary and bibliography). All in all it is a valuable, if a little specialised, supplement."

Ken Rolston briefly reviewed Tall Tales of the Wee Folk for Dragon magazine No. 154 (February 1990). Rolston called the book a "well-written and imaginative D&D supplement" and concludes that "The treatments of these beings as PCs are remarkably faithful to the tone and dignity of their fairy sources, and the adventures featuring these character types are original and satisfying. This supplement is highly recommended for D&D and AD&D game players and may be a pleasant surprise for any sophisticated role-players interested in the traditions and legends of fairie."

Jim Bambra reviewed Tall Tales of the Wee Folk for Dragon magazine No. 164 (December 1990). Bambra noted that although the blending of mythology from cultures such as Celtic and ancient Greek "is keeping with the eclectic background of the D&D game, it tends to blur differences between the two cultures, detracting from the overall cohesiveness of the product". He felt that "Each race is neatly handled, and players are given plenty of good role-playing hooks. Occasionally the text lapses into game terminology in the middle of character speech, and that jars the narrative." He complimented the background information on the forest realm, calling it "useful and contains some very nice touches, such as the way the Fairy Court holds its meetings using a timestop spell". Bambra found the fact that player characters start the game with negative experience points to be uninspiring, especially compared to the design guidelines set out in The Orcs of Thar, where large and powerful creatures, such as trolls and ogres, start off as young members of their race who have to work their way up to normal monster level: "A bit of time and effort taken here would have improved this product tremendously and helped to have pushed the game mechanics into the background." He found other design problems in the product, such as races making saving rolls as character classes of the same level—a problem for a creature that has not achieved 1st level—and how creatures fight according to their number of hit dice, but no indication is given on how to handle the combat abilities of high-level creatures who no longer gain hit dice. He felt that PC1 is much better with handling the well balanced relative experience-level costs, with no race being more powerful than another, and liked that the new fairy spells "give a distinct flavor to these whimsical and fun creatures", and felt that "there's plenty of scope for humorous role-playing, particularly with the pooka and faun". Bambra concludes with this evaluation: Tall Tales of the Wee Folk contains some very good ideas, particularly in its background sections. But it fails to live up to the very high standards set by The Orcs of Thar. It does a good job of introducing us to the woodland creatures and expanding on the information contained in the rulebooks, but suffers from a number of minor design problems. Even given these, Tall Tales of the Wee Folk is a fine product."
