= Jess Heinig =

American game designer

- Occupation: Game designer

Jess Heinig is an American game designer best known for working on the Mage: The Ascension series of games in the early 2000s. Since then he has worked on several other role-playing games and served as a programmer for Fallout 1.

== Career ==
Jess Heinig is best known as an author and developer for White Wolf, Inc. He helped produce, as an author and/or developer, numerous Mage: The Ascension titles, including Mage: The Ascension Revised Edition.

Heinig and Jeff Tidball were two designers hired by the Last Unicorn Games RPG division of Decipher Games in the interim between Wizards of the Coast (2000) and Decipher (2001) purchasing Last Unicorn; by January 2004, Heinig and Tidball were the last two employees left at Last Unicorn, and Decipher therefore closed its RPG division and laid them off.

John Wick had talked about designing a version of the d20 System with Heinig that eliminated statistics such as levels, classes, alignments, and hit points, but Wicked Press encountered difficulties that prevented this from happening.

When Bill Bridges moved back to White Wolf Publishing in 2002, he replaced Heinig as the developer for the revised edition of Mage: The Ascension. In 2004, Heinig was a Guest of Honor for gaming at Conjecture. Heinig's Wilderness (2013) for Houses of the Blooded appeared in early 2013. Heinig wrote rules for a series of unusual and "wicked" takes on standard fantasy races for John Wick's Wicked Fantasy articles in Kobold Quarterly.

Jess Heinig was also a programmer for Fallout 1 and currently writes for Modiphius Entertainment's Fallout: The Roleplaying Game.
