= Lunch Money (game) =

Lunch Money is an elimination-style card game designed by C.E. Wiedman and released in May 1996 by Atlas Games. The game consisted of 110 cards and was sold as a complete box set.

== Gameplay ==
The art on the cards consists of dark, somewhat Gothic photographic images of a small girl (photos by Andrew Yates), usually accompanied by humorous quotes pertaining to the card's name.

In the game, players control a character with fifteen "health" points, and draw a hand of five cards. The players take turns playing cards to "attack" other players, who try to block, dodge, and counterattack the attacker. When the defender is done responding, he or she takes any applicable damage, and both players then redraw their hands to five cards, passing the turn to the next player. When a player loses all her health points she passes out. The last one "conscious" wins the game.

The game's name derives from its theme, that of children involved in a schoolyard fight. There is also a small expansion set called Sticks and Stones, and a larger sequel/expansion called Beer Money.

There are several types of cards, including Basic Attacks, Special Attacks, Weapons, and Defense cards. Each is distinguished by a different background color to the artwork: for example, the images on Defense cards have a blue tint.

Basic Attack cards do a set amount of damage (i.e., take away health points) if not countered. Damage ranges from one to seven points depending on the card played. Basic Attacks can be countered by Block or Dodge. If not countered, the targeted player marks off the appropriate number of points, and the turn ends.

Special Attacks usually do damage, but have other effects as well. For example, Poke In The Eye does only one point of direct damage, but also renders the target unable to defend against a follow-up attack from the same player who used Poke In The Eye, and either leaves the target defenseless against an attack from the next player to take a turn, or, if the next player is the victim, makes the victim lose a turn. Special Attacks can be countered by playing Block, Dodge, or, in the case of Grab (which does no initial damage, but sets up the victim for other attacks like Headlock and Choke), Freedom.

Weapons, like Basic Attacks, do simple damage (always three points) without additional harmful effects to the target, but unlike all other cards, they are not discarded when played. A player can thus use the Hammer, for example, repeatedly over the course of many turns. Weapon attacks may be countered with Block or Dodge. They can also be countered by the otherwise useless Disarm, which forces the attacker to discard the Weapon. Persons playing Disarm are not allowed to capture the weapon for their own use.

Defense cards either negate Attacks, allowing the target to avoid taking damage, or repair damage already taken. Dodge may be used against any attack card: Block against any attack other than Grab. Freedom is useful only against Grab attacks, and may also be used to escape from Special Attacks that do ongoing damage, such as Headlock. First Aid "heals" two points of damage when played. Any number of First Aid cards may be played at the same time, either on a player's turn, or as a last-ditch defense if a player takes enough damage from an attack that he or she would otherwise be out of the game.

Humiliation, the trump card of the game, is usually used as a Defense since it immediately cancels the effect of any single card. However, since it can be played at any time and for any reason (without the player needing to wait for his or her turn), it can also be used offensively to, for example, cancel another player's successful Dodge or use of First Aid. Humiliation cannot be countered except with the use of another Humiliation.

According to the game directions, Humiliation, when played, should always be accompanied by a detailed description of what has been done to thoroughly Humiliate the victim. This is an example of the way the game encourages boasting and trash talking as part of the fun.

== Reception ==
Derek Pearcy reviewed Lunch Money for Pyramid magazine and stated that "the cards were cool. I'd known about the game for some time, but playing it late at night after a busy day on the con floor, watching industry mavens pause from play to laugh over a caption or ooh over the beautiful photos, struck home for me just how unique a game Lunch Money would be. In an industry that was - even then - sick of cards and card games, this one got an awful lot of attention."

Andy Butcher reviewed Lunch Money for Arcane magazine, rating it a 7 out of 10 overall. Butcher comments that "Lunch Money succeeds at what it sets out to do, which is to provide a quick, fun-packed combat game that takes virtually no preparation and can be learnt in five minutes. Even if the artwork is a bit weird."

In 1997, Lunch Money jointly won the Origins Award for Best Card Game of 1996 in a three-way tie with Legend of the Five Rings: Battle of Beiden Pass and Mythos.

In 1999, Pyramid magazine named Lunch Money as one of The Millennium's Best Card Games. Editor Scott Haring said that "what puts it on this list is the twisted sensibility of using arty photographs of innocent young girls in spooky settings, juxtaposed with the cruel whimsy on the card text."

== Reviews ==
- Australian Realms #29
