= Carolinas =

U.S. states of North Carolina and South Carolina

The Carolinas
- Region
- Coordinates: 34°48′17″N 79°40′31″W
- Country: United States
- States: North Carolina; South Carolina
- Major cities: Charlotte, N.C.; Raleigh, N.C.; Winston-Salem, N.C.; Charleston, S.C.; Columbia, S.C.; Wilmington, N.C.; Asheville, N.C.; Greenville, S.C.; Myrtle Beach, S.C.
- Largest metropolitan area: Charlotte-Concord-Gastonia
- Largest city: Charlotte
- Colonized as Province of Carolina: 1663

Area
  - Total: 85,839 sq mi (222,320 km^{2})
  - Land: 78,804 sq mi (204,100 km^{2})
  - Water: 7,025 sq mi (18,190 km^{2}) 8.2%

Population (2020)
  - Total: 15,557,813
  - Density: 197.42/sq mi (76.226/km^{2})
- Demonym: Carolinian

GDP (nominal)
  - Total: $1.014 trillion (2022)
  - per capita: $65,145 (2022)
- Time zone: UTC-5 (EST)
  - Summer (DST): UTC-4 (EDT)

The Carolinas (informally Carolina) are the U.S. states of North Carolina and South Carolina considered together as a historical or cultural entity. They are bordered by Virginia to the north, Tennessee to the west, and Georgia to the southwest. The Atlantic Ocean is to the east and south.

The Carolinas originally formed the British Province of Carolina during early colonial period, from 1663 until they were declared two separate royal colonies in 1729. The land had previously been a part of the Colony and Dominion of Virginia, from 1609 to 1663. The province was named Carolina to honor King Charles I of England. Carolina is a feminine form of the Latin word Carolus, meaning "Charles".

The Carolinas have a total of 15,557,813 residents. The largest city of the Carolinas (ranked by land area and population) is Charlotte, North Carolina.

== History ==
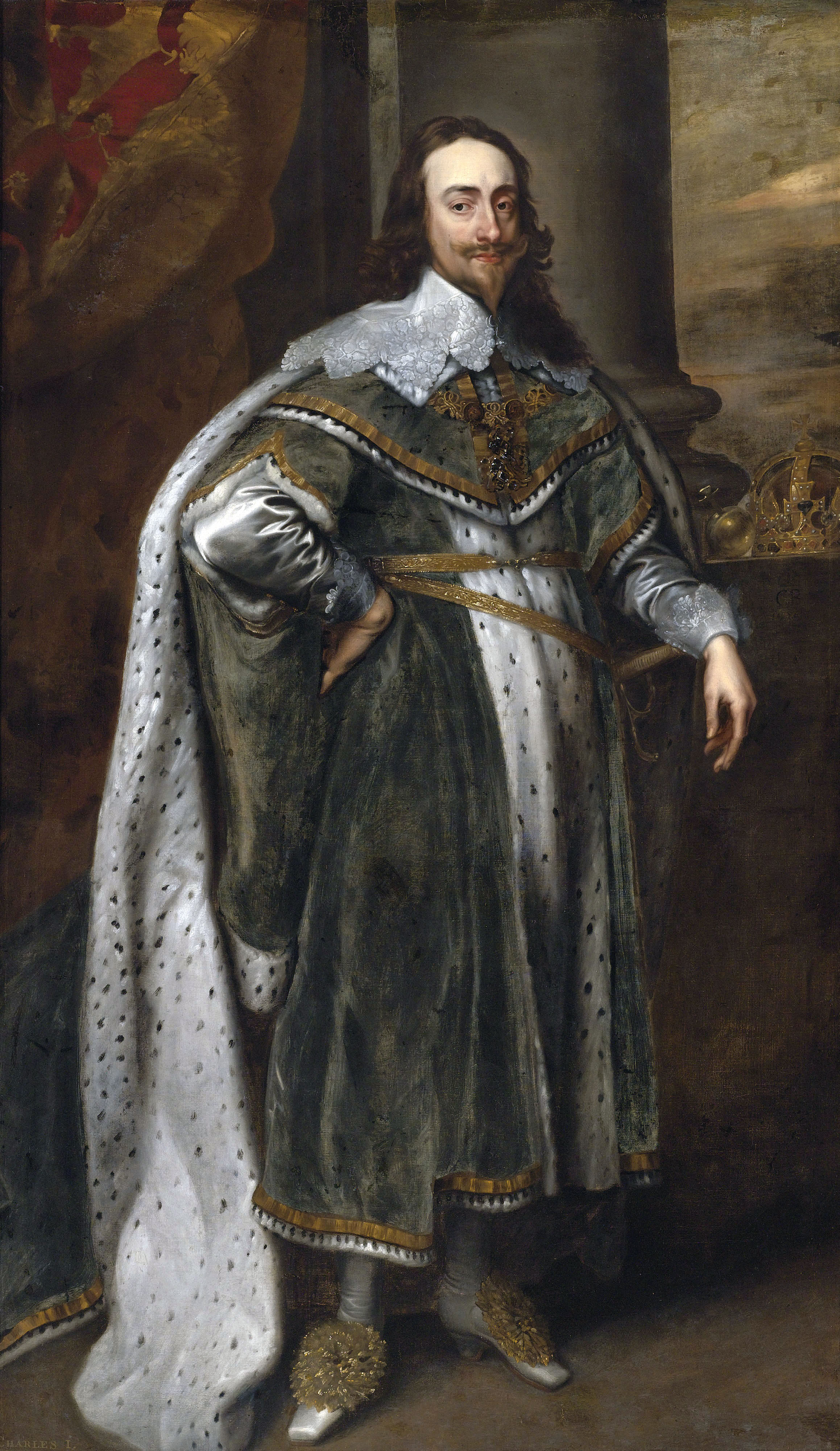
The Carolinas are named after King Charles I of England. Carolina is taken from the Latin word for "Charles", Carolus.

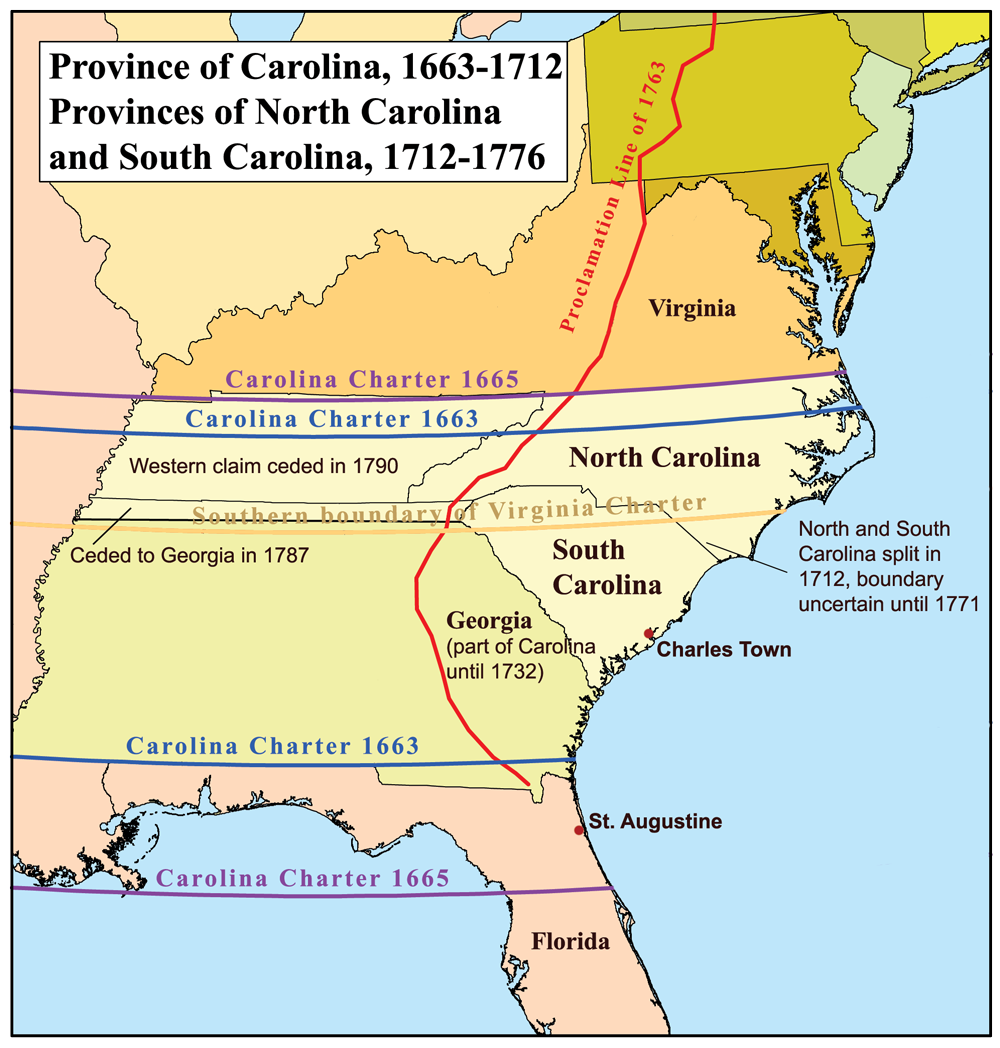
The 1663 Province of Carolina Charter

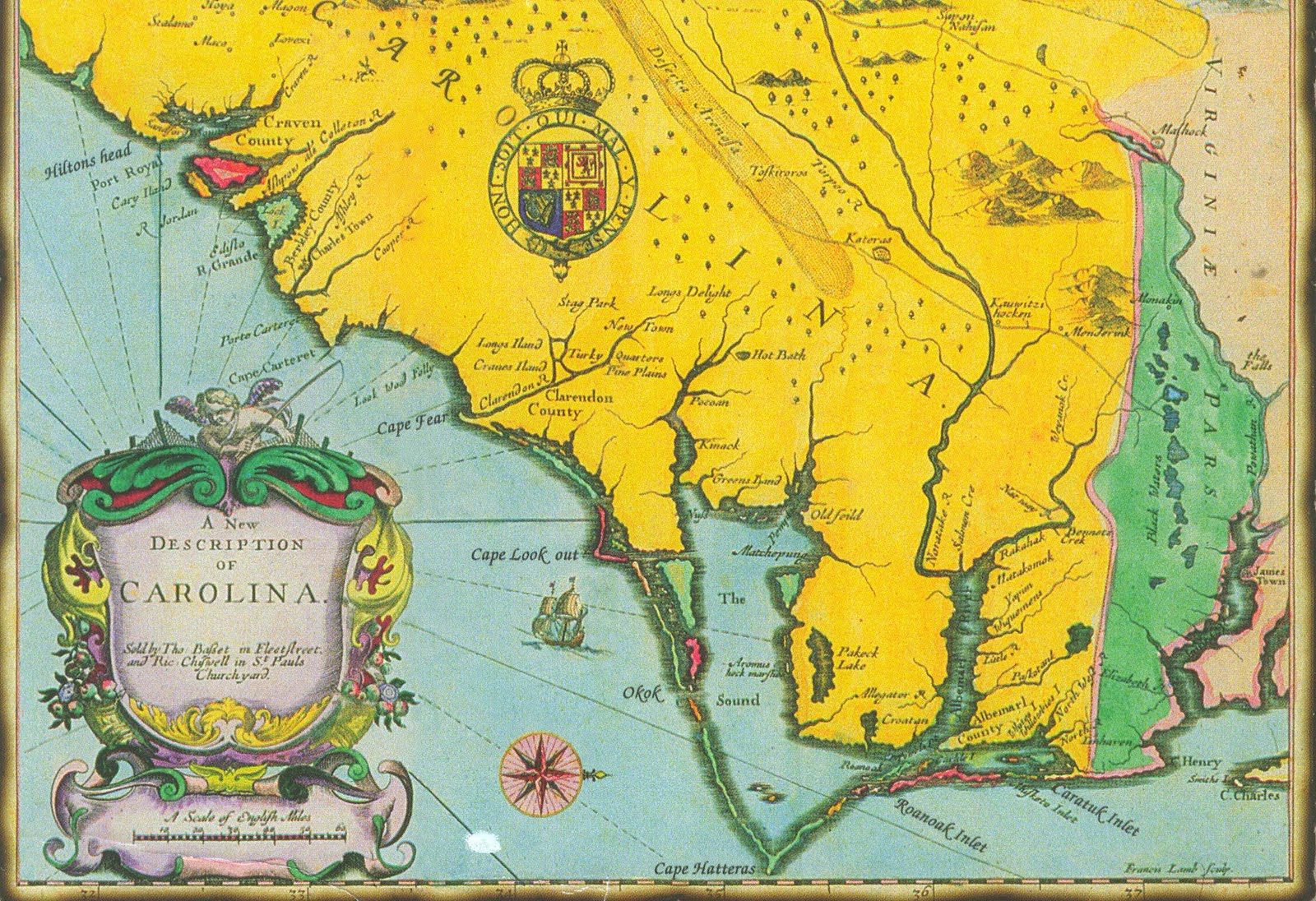
"A New Description of Carolina" map, engraved by Francis Lamb (London, Tho. Basset and Richard Chiswell, 1676)

The region was claimed as part of the Spanish territory named La Florida by Ponce de Leon in 1513. Santa Elena, a Spanish settlement on what is now Parris Island, South Carolina, was the capital of La Florida from 1566 to 1587. It was founded by Pedro Menéndez de Avilés, the first governor of Spanish Florida. There had been a number of earlier attempts to establish colonies in the area by both the Spanish and the French, who had been inspired by earlier accounts of the plentiful land of Chicora. Menéndez's Santa Elena settlement shifted the focus of Spanish colonial efforts northward from St. Augustine, which had been established in 1565 to drive the French from their colony of Fort Caroline. Santa Elena was ultimately built at the site of the abandoned French outpost of Charlesfort, founded in 1562 by Jean Ribault.

The establishment of Santa Elena followed the destruction of the French Fort Caroline by Menéndez in 1565. The Spanish settlement housed a sizeable community, and became the base of operations for the Jesuits and military working in the northern zone of Spanish Florida. From this base the Spanish founded a number of other ephemeral forts as far inland as the Appalachian Mountains, but resistance from local Native American tribes and the lack of interest of Spain in the area, caused these to be abandoned, relocated or destroyed. Santa Elena was ultimately abandoned in 1587, with its survivors relocating to St. Augustine. The Spanish never pressed their colonial claims to the area again, focusing on other areas of the American continent. The territory was thereafter left to the native Americans until October 30, 1629, when Charles I granted a patent to his attorney-general, Sir Robert Heath, for the lands south of 36 degrees and north of 31 degrees, "under the name, in honor of that king, of Carolana". Carolus is Latin for 'Charles'. The charter was unrealized and later ruled invalid.

On March 24, 1663, Charles II issued a new charter to a group of eight English noblemen, granting them the land of Carolina, as a reward for their faithful support of his efforts to regain the throne of England. The eight were called Lords Proprietor or simply Proprietors. The 1663 charter granted the Lords Proprietor title to all of the land from the southern border of the Virginia Colony at 36 degrees north to 31 degrees north (along the coast of present-day Georgia). The establishment of separate colonies did not officially occur until 1729, when seven of the Lords Proprietors sold their interests in Carolina to the Crown, and both North Carolina and South Carolina became royal colonies.

In 1665, the charter was revised slightly, with the northerly boundary extended to 36 degrees 30 minutes north to include the lands of the Albemarle Settlements along the Albemarle Sound, which had been settled mainly by Virginians migrating south. Likewise, the southern boundary was moved south to 29 degrees north, just south of present-day Daytona Beach, Florida, which had the effect of including the existing Spanish settlement at St. Augustine, an unenforceable overreach of English power. The charter also granted all the land, between these northerly and southerly bounds, from the Atlantic Ocean, westward to the shores of the Pacific Ocean, an even more unenforceable overreach.

Between 1663 and 1729 there were many disagreements relating to defense, governance and the difference between the two differing agrarian styles employed by the inhabitants of the Colony of Virginia and that practiced by the planters arriving to Charles Town from the West Indies and Barbados.

In 1729 the Province of Carolina was divided when the descendants of seven of the eight Lords Proprietors sold their shares back to the Crown. Only the heirs of Sir George Carteret retained their original rights to what would become the Granville District. Both the Province of North Carolina and the Province of South Carolina became British Crown Colonies in 1729.

During the American Civil War (1861–1865), South Carolina was the first Southern state to secede from the Union, while North Carolina was the second to last state to secede. South Carolina was generally one of the strongest supporters of the Confederacy. The war began in Charleston, South Carolina, where cadets of the South Carolina Military Academy, known as The Citadel, fired the opening shots at the Union Ship Star of the West. North Carolina was also a key Confederate state, raising and supplying many regiments of soldiers to the Confederacy. At Gettysburg, one in four Confederate soldiers was from North Carolina, despite the fact that some North Carolinians (especially in the western part of the state) refused to support the Confederacy. North Carolina's Civil War governor, Zebulon Vance, was an outspoken critic of Confederate President Jefferson Davis and frequently refused to obey Davis's orders for reinforcements and supplies; Vance insisted the soldiers and supplies would be needed for North Carolina's Confederate effort. However, during the seven days' battles, North Carolina did send large numbers of troops for the general aid of the South as a whole. The Carolinas were both instrumental in keeping the Confederacy alive, because of their deepwater ports in Wilmington and Charleston. These two cities were key in supplying Southern armies with weapons, clothing, and ammunition, and producing food and provisions for Southern civilians.

A Unionist presence would persist throughout North Carolina during the Civil War, with North Carolina forming its own Union Army regiments. In South Carolina, no Union Army regiments were formed due to a smaller unionist presence, although the Upstate region of the state was a haven for Confederate Army deserters and resisters, as they used the Upstate topography and traditional community relations to resist service in the Confederate ranks.

== Culture ==
The culture of the Carolinas is a distinct subset of larger Southern culture. Notably, the coastal Carolinas region was settled by Europeans over a century before the inland regions of the South. There was a particular early influence of Caribbean culture, especially from the English colony of Barbados; from which came many of the early governors during the unified period.

Though the two states both make up part of the Southern United States, there are historically a number of differences in the settlement patterns, political development, and economic growth between North and South Carolina.

== Politics ==
During most of the 20th century, South Carolina was a bastion of the "solid Democratic South" with almost no Republican officeholders, and the state frequently elected politicians who were outspoken supporters of racial segregation. North Carolina, while mostly Democratic, contained a large Republican minority—the state voted Republican in the presidential election of 1928 and elected several Republican congressmen, governors, and senators from 1868 to 1928—and North Carolina was widely known as one of the more progressive Southern states on the issue of segregation and civil rights. In 1947, the journalist John Gunther wrote, "that North Carolina is by a good deal the most progressive Southern state will, I imagine, be agreed to by almost everybody." On the other hand, he described South Carolina as "one of the poorest American states, and probably one of the balkiest." In describing the differences between the two states, Gunther noted that, in 1947, divorce in North Carolina "may be granted simply on the ground of absence of cohabitation; South Carolina is the one American state in which divorce is not possible."

Despite North Carolina being a swing state in presidential elections since the early 21st century, and South Carolina being one that reliably votes for Republican presidential candidates, they are technically the country's two most politically similar states, according to a comparison of the states along a range of 19 variables performed by the statistician Nate Silver in 2008.

== Economy ==
Historically, like much of the South, the Carolinas economy was one based around agriculture production. The predominance of certain crops would help influence the regional economy:

Like other [Southern] states, until after World War II, North Carolina remained primarily a region of small farms and factories heavily dependent on just a few labor-intensive crops, relying on sharecropping and tenancy, especially for black laborers. The Carolinas are distinct for their economic dependence on tobacco as well as on cotton and rice, and for their many small-scale furniture, textile, and tobacco factories.

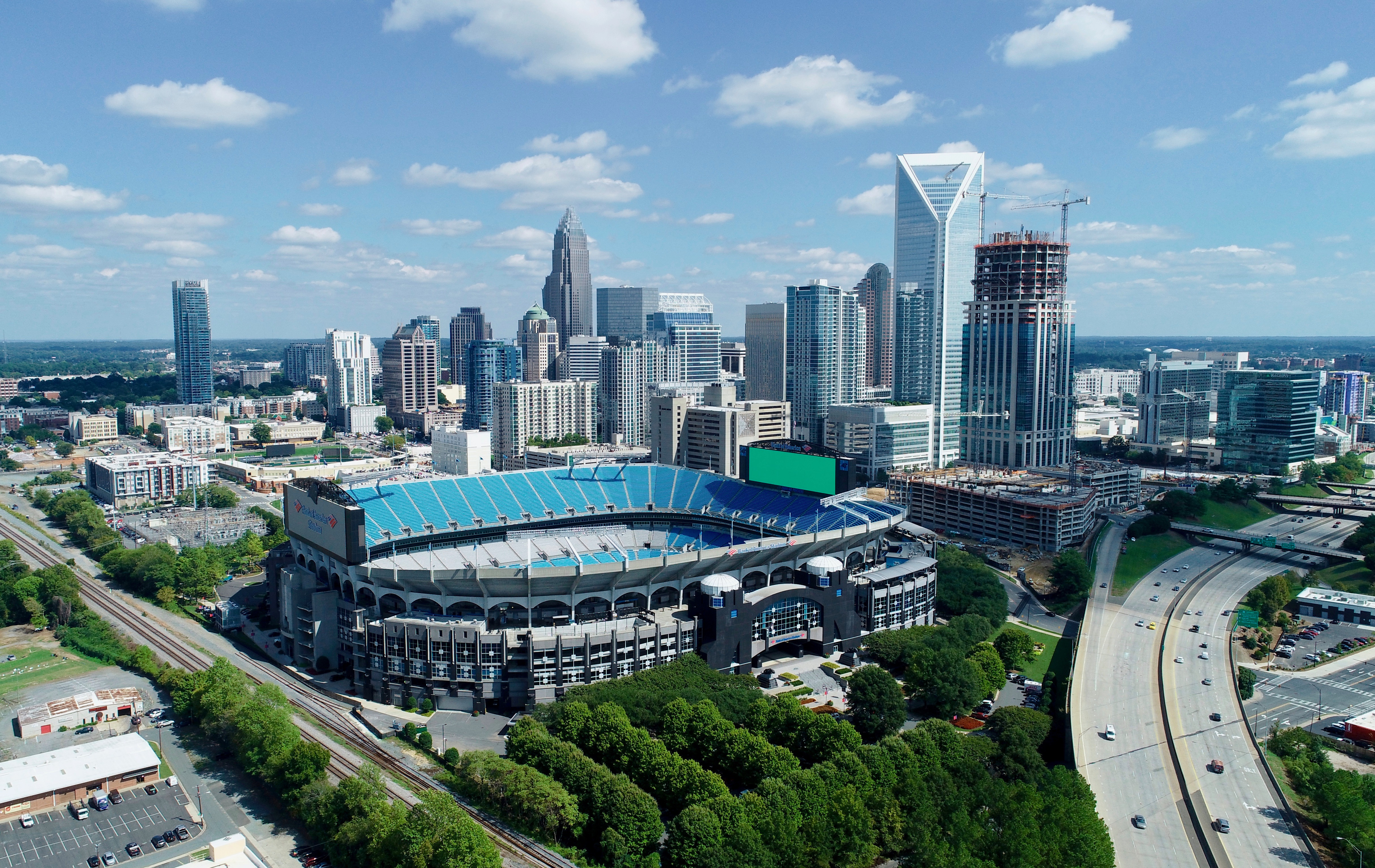
Charlotte, North Carolina skyline in 2018, the largest city and metro area of the Carolinas.

These industries gave the Carolinas, particularly North Carolina, a more significant industrial base than most Southern states. As mechanization increased in farming, along with textiles, apparel, and furniture jobs shifting because of globalization, combined with the decline of the tobacco industry, many rural and small urban communities suffered economically. During the late 20th century, both states began to experience growth in the technological and banking sectors, bringing jobs, population growth, and new economic industries. These changes, as with earlier industrialization, were more pronounced in North Carolina, with South Carolina experiencing a slower rate of economic growth for several years.

Since the 1980s, North Carolina has emerged as a financial hub with Charlotte becoming the second-largest financial district in the United States after New York City. Charlotte is headquarters to several major publicly traded corporations such as Bank of America, Truist Financial, and the East Coast operations of Wells Fargo, and Centene Corporation, as well as six other Fortune 500 companies, including Lowe's, Duke Energy, Nucor, Honeywell, Brighthouse Financial, and Sonic Automotive.

== Boundary between the states ==
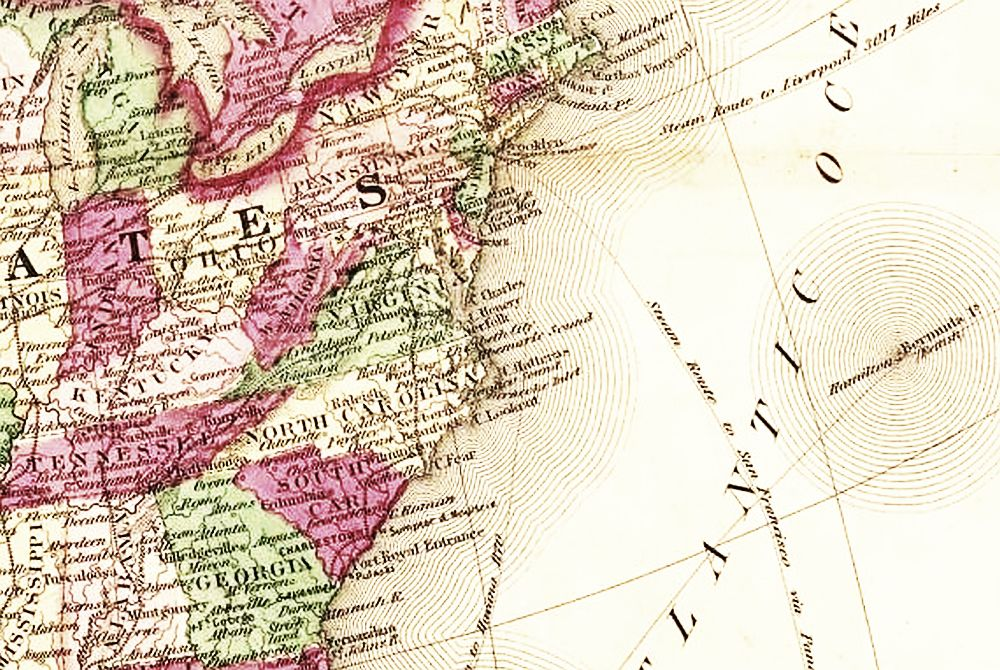
Map of the Carolinas, Virginia, Georgia and Bermuda

=== Plotting the boundary ===
According to the Prefatory Notes to Volume 5 of the Colonial Records of North Carolina, the process of determining the boundary between North and South Carolina began in 1720 "when the purpose to erect a third Province in Carolina, with Savannah for its northern boundary" began. On 8 January 1730 an agreement between the two colonies said for the border "to begin 30 miles (48 km) southwest of the Cape Fear River, and to be run at that parallel distance the whole course of said river;" The next June Governor Robert Johnson of South Carolina said the border should start 30 miles (48 km) southwest of the source of the Cape Fear "due west as far as the South Sea", unless the "Waccamaw River lyes [sic] within 30 miles (48 km) of the Cape Fear river," which would make the Waccamaw the boundary. North Carolina agreed to this until the discovery that the Cape Fear headwaters were very close to Virginia, which would not have "permitted any extension on the part of North Carolina to the westward." In 1732, Governor George Burrington of North Carolina stated in Timothy's Southern Gazette that territory north of the Waccamaw was in North Carolina, to which Johnson replied that South Carolina claimed the land. Johnson also said that when the two met before the Board of Trade in London two years earlier, Burrington had "insisted that the Waccamaw should be the boundary from its mouth to its head," while South Carolina agreed the border should be located 30 miles (48 km) from the mouth, not the source. Johnson said this was "only a mistake in wording it."

Both Carolinas selected commissioners to survey the line between them. The plan called for the line to run northwest to 35 degrees latitude, unless the Pee Dee River was reached first, in which case it would run along the Pee Dee to 35 degrees north. Then the line would run west to Catawba town, though if the town were north of the line, the line was to run around Catawba to keep it in South Carolina.

In May 1735, the surveyors went from the Cape Fear westward 30 miles (48 km) along the coast. Then they turned northwest and marked the location with stakes. The surveyors agreed to meet again on September 18. However, only the North Carolina team returned at that time, extending the line northwest 70 miles (110 km). The South Carolina team arrived in October and followed the previous line for only 40 miles (64 km) because they had not been paid. A deputy surveyor marked where the Pee Dee crossed the 35th parallel. An extension of the line in 1737 ran 22 miles (35 km) to a stake in a meadow. However, the stake placed at the endpoint of the survey was 12 miles (19 km) too far south.

In 1764, a second extension ran 62 miles (100 km) westward. In 1772, after making adjustments to keep the Catawba Indians in South Carolina, "extended in a due west course from the confluence of the north and south forks of the Catawba River to Tryon Mountain." However, this extension was based on the erroneous position of the 1737 stake, removing 422,000 acres (1,710 km^{2}) from South Carolina. Joseph Caldwell, president of the University of North Carolina at Chapel Hill, found that the line west of the Pee Dee did not run along the 35th parallel, but 12 miles (19 km) to the south. However, the western part of the line ran far enough to the north to make up for the difference. West of this point the border was shifted to run north of the 35th parallel so that the total areas of the states would return to what was intended, although the accuracy of this part of the survey was marred by a magnetic anomaly in the Charlotte, North Carolina area.

North Carolina did not agree to the line of 1772 until 1813. A 1905 survey determined the border between Scotland County, North Carolina and Marlboro County, South Carolina. A 1928 survey decided the border between Horry County, South Carolina and Brunswick and Columbus counties in North Carolina.

=== Recent history ===
In the mid-1990s, Duke Power determined that the border between the Carolinas needed to be re-surveyed, as the company was selling and donating land in the Jocassee Gorge area, which included parts of both states. Also, with more people living outside cities, the precise boundaries of fire, tax, and school district lines needed to be known. This was especially a problem in the mountains, where people had previously lived in valleys, not on the ridges where the border was. A 15-year plan to re-establish the boundary began, using maps from the 1813–1815 survey and GPS technology. A few stone markers still read, "NC/SC 1815 AD" but other locations were marked with trees which no longer stand.

South Carolina had recently been involved in a costly legal battle with Georgia over a small number of islands in the Savannah River, and wanted to avoid the expense of a lawsuit regarding the North Carolina border, so the two states agreed in 1993 to cooperate in resurveying the border. The effort included using colonial-era maps to reconstruct the positions of trees marking the border that had long since died, and tracking down the original positions of stone markers that had been moved.

After 18 years and $980,000, it was predicted that the process of determining the border between the Carolinas would be complete in 2012. Financial problems delayed the last survey until October 2012, meaning the results were not expected to be known until spring 2013. It was found that a gas station and 30 homes could change states. Lake Wylie Mini Market has been located in South Carolina, along U.S. Route 321, and the move to North Carolina would result in higher gas taxes and change laws on beer and fireworks. The state legislatures involved expect to pass laws alleviating the concerns those changing states would face.

The Joint Boundary Commission met in February 2014 in Monroe, North Carolina, to determine what actions still needed to be taken. The persons living in 50 homes that changed states would have to get driver's licenses and register to vote in their new states. Legislative action could allow people to keep utilities, avoid back taxes to the new state, and continue in the same schools. Lake Wylie Minimarket could be grandfathered, or Congress could change the defined border at the store's location, though the commission intended to avoid such an action. As of August 2014, the states were expected to pass legislation to mitigate many of the negative impacts to affected landowners.

On June 1, 2016, the South Carolina House of Representatives passed a bill setting the border. North Carolina's Senate also passed a bill, which also had to clear the House. North Carolina Governor Pat McCrory signed his state's bill in June. Three families who actually lived in North Carolina had South Carolina addresses, and 16 South Carolina residents had believed they lived in North Carolina. On December 9, 2016, McCrory announced that he signed a four-page executive order formally defining the border between the two states based on the 20 years of work.

== Major population centers ==
=== Combined Statistical Areas ===
The most populous combined statistical areas of the Carolinas
Rank	CSA	Population (2019)	Population (2010)	Change	Constituent CSA
1	Charlotte-Concord, NC-SC Combined Statistical Area	2,797,636	2,402,623	+16.44%	Charlotte-Concord-Gastonia, NC-SC Metropolitan Statistical Area; Shelby, NC Micropolitan Statistical Area; Albemarle, NC Micropolitan Statistical Area
2	Raleigh-Durham-Cary, NC Combined Statistical Area	2,079,687	1,740,185	+19.51%	Raleigh, NC Metropolitan Statistical Area; Durham-Chapel Hill, NC Metropolitan Statistical Area; Dunn, NC Micropolitan Statistical Area; Oxford, NC Micropolitan Statistical Area; Sanford, NC Micropolitan Statistical Area; Henderson, NC Micropolitan Statistical Area
3	Greensboro–Winston-Salem–High Point, NC Combined Statistical Area	1,689,151	1,589,200	+6.29%	Greensboro-High Point, NC Metropolitan Statistical Area; Winston-Salem, NC Metropolitan Statistical Area; Burlington, NC Metropolitan Statistical Area; Mount Airy, NC Micropolitan Statistical Area
4	Greenville-Spartanburg-Anderson, SC Combined Statistical Area	1,475,235	1,336,656	+10.37%	Greenville-Anderson, SC Metropolitan Statistical Area; Spartanburg, SC Metropolitan Statistical Area; Greenwood, SC Micropolitan Statistical Area; Seneca, SC Micropolitan Statistical Area; Gaffney, SC Micropolitan Statistical Area
5	Columbia-Orangeburg-Newberry, SC Combined Statistical Area	963,048	897,607	+7.29%	Columbia, SC Metropolitan Statistical Area; Orangeburg, SC Micropolitan Statistical Area; Newberry, SC Micropolitan Statistical Area
6	Fayetteville-Lumberton-Laurinburg, NC Combined Statistical Area	854,826	797,499	+7.19%	Fayetteville, NC Metropolitan Statistical Area; Lumberton, NC Micropolitan Statistical Area; Laurinburg, NC Micropolitan Statistical Area
7	Myrtle Beach-Conway, SC-NC Combined Statistical Area	559,581	436,880	+28.09%	Myrtle Beach-Conway-North Myrtle Beach, SC-NC Metropolitan Statistical Area; Georgetown, SC Micropolitan Statistical Area
8	Asheville-Marion-Brevard, NC Combined Statistical Area	542,821	502,944	+7.93%	Asheville, NC Metropolitan Statistical Area; Brevard, NC Micropolitan Statistical Area

=== Metropolitan Statistical Areas ===
The most populous metropolitan statistical areas of the Carolinas
Rank	MSA	Population (2019)	Population (2010)	Change	Encompassing CSA
1	Charlotte-Concord-Gastonia, NC-SC Metropolitan Statistical Area	2,636,883	2,217,012	+18.94%	Charlotte-Concord, NC-SC Combined Statistical Area
2	Raleigh-Cary, NC Metropolitan Statistical Area	1,390,785	1,130,490	+23.02%	Raleigh-Durham-Chapel Hill, NC Combined Statistical Area
3	Greenville-Anderson, SC Metropolitan Statistical Area	920,477	824,112	+11.69%	Greenville-Spartanburg-Anderson, SC Combined Statistical Area
4	Columbia, SC Metropolitan Statistical Area	838,433	767,598	+9.23%	Columbia-Orangeburg-Newberry, SC Combined Statistical Area
5	Charleston-North Charleston, SC Metropolitan Statistical Area	802,122	664,607	+20.69%	
6	Greensboro-High Point, NC Metropolitan Statistical Area	771,851	723,801	+6.64%	Greensboro–Winston-Salem–High Point, NC Combined Statistical Area
7	Winston-Salem, NC Metropolitan Statistical Area	676,008	640,595	+5.53%	Greensboro–Winston-Salem–High Point, NC Combined Statistical Area

=== Urban areas ===
The most populous urban areas of the Carolinas
Rank	Urban Area	Population (2010)	Population (2000)	Change	Land Area (sq mi)
1	Charlotte, NC-SC	1,249,442	758,927	+64.63%	741.5
2	Raleigh, NC	884,891	541,527	+63.41%	518.1
3	Columbia, SC	549,777	420,537	+30.73%	380.0
4	Charleston-North Charleston, SC	548,404	423,410	+29.52%	293.4
5	Greenville, SC	400,492	302,194	+32.53%	320.3
6	Winston-Salem, NC	391,024	299,290	+30.65%	322.6
7	Durham, NC	347,602	287,796	+20.78%	181.7
8	Greensboro, NC	311,810	267,884	+16.40%	185.2

=== Counties ===
The most populous counties of the Carolinas
Rank	County	Population (2023)	Population (2020)	Change	Area (sq mi)	Primary City
1	Wake County, North Carolina	1,190,275	1,129,410	+5.39%	857	Raleigh
2	Mecklenburg County, North Carolina	1,163,701	1,115,482	+4.32%	546	Charlotte
3	Greenville County, South Carolina	558,036	525,534	+6.18%	795	Greenville
4	Guilford County, North Carolina	549,866	541,299	+1.58%	658	Greensboro
5	Richland County, South Carolina	425,138	416,147	+2.16%	772	Columbia
6	Charleston County, South Carolina	424,367	408,235	+3.95%	1,358	Charleston

=== Cities ===
The 10 largest cities of each Carolina
Rank	City	Population (2020)	Population (2010)	Change	Area (sq mi)
1	Charlotte, North Carolina	874,579	731,424	+19.57%	310.0
2	Raleigh, North Carolina	467,665	403,892	+15.79%	148.5
3	Greensboro, North Carolina	299,035	269,666	+10.89%	131.4
4	Durham, North Carolina	283,506	228,330	+24.17%	115.4
5	Winston-Salem, North Carolina	249,545	229,617	+8.68%	133.5
6	Fayetteville, North Carolina	208,501	200,564	+3.96%	148.3
7	Cary, North Carolina	174,721	135,234	+29.20%	59.9
8	Wilmington, North Carolina	115,451	106,476	+8.43%	51.4
9	High Point, North Carolina	114,059	104,371	+9.28%	56.9
10	Concord, North Carolina	105,240	79,066	+33.10%	64.0

Rank	City	Population (2020)	Population (2010)	Change	Area (sq mi)
1	Charleston, South Carolina	150,227	120,083	+25.10%	114.8
2	Columbia, South Carolina	136,632	129,272	+5.69%	137.2
3	North Charleston, South Carolina	114,852	97,471	+17.83%	77.6
4	Mount Pleasant, South Carolina	90,801	67,843	+33.84%	49.5
5	Rock Hill, South Carolina	74,372	66,154	+12.42%	39.8
6	Greenville, South Carolina	70,720	58,409	+21.08%	29.8
7	Summerville, South Carolina	50,915	43,392	+17.34%	21.6
8	Goose Creek, South Carolina	45,946	35,938	+27.85%	42.3
9	Sumter, South Carolina	43,463	40,524	+7.25%	32.8
10	Florence, South Carolina	39,899	37,056	+7.67%	23.4

== Professional sports ==
Club	League	Sport	City	Stadium	Established	Championships
Carolina Core FC	MLSNP	Soccer	High Point, North Carolina	Truist Point	2022	none
Carolina Hurricanes	NHL	Ice hockey	Raleigh, North Carolina	Lenovo Center	1997	2 Stanley Cup titles, 3 Conference titles, 7 Division titles
Carolina Panthers	NFL	Football	Charlotte, North Carolina	Bank of America Stadium	1995	2 Super Bowl Appearances/NFC Conference titles, 6 Division titles (1-NFC West, 5-NFC South)
Charleston Battery	USLC	Soccer	Charleston, South Carolina	Patriots Point Soccer Complex	1993	1 USL Second Division title, 1 USL First Division title, 1 USL Championship title
Charlotte FC	MLS	Soccer	Charlotte, North Carolina	Bank of America Stadium	2022	none
Charlotte Hornets	NBA	Basketball	Charlotte, North Carolina	Spectrum Center	1988	none
Charlotte Independence	USLL1	Soccer	Charlotte, North Carolina	American Legion Memorial Stadium	2014	none
Crown Legacy FC	MLSNP	Soccer	Matthews, North Carolina	Sportsplex at Matthews	2022	none
Greenville Triumph SC	USLL1	Soccer	Greenville, South Carolina	Paladin Stadium	2018	1 USL League One title
North Carolina Courage	NWSL	Soccer (women's)	Cary, North Carolina	WakeMed Soccer Park	2017	2 NWSL Playoff Championships, 1 NWSL Challenge Cup, 3 NWSL Shields (best regular-season record)
North Carolina FC	USLC	Soccer	Cary, North Carolina	WakeMed Soccer Park	2006	1 USL League One title

The Carolinas have three professional sports teams in the Big Four major leagues: the Carolina Panthers of the NFL, the Charlotte Hornets of the NBA, and the Carolina Hurricanes of the NHL. Supported by both states, the three teams are all based in NC, with two in Charlotte and the third in Raleigh.

Professional sports franchises in the Carolinas first formed during the late 20th century. The oldest pro team in the Carolinas, the NBA's Charlotte Hornets, were established in 1988, while the youngest, Major League Soccer's Charlotte FC, were established in 2019. The Hornets were known as the Bobcats from 2004 to 2014, and were renamed the Hornets again in May 2014, one season after the former New Orleans Hornets decided to rebrand themselves as the Pelicans. At that time, the Hornets also regained sole ownership of the pre-relocation history of the original Charlotte Hornets. The Hurricanes formed in 1971 as the New England Whalers of the World Hockey Association. After the NHL-WHA merger in 1979, they joined the NHL as the Hartford Whalers until 1997 when they relocated to Raleigh, North Carolina. Currently, the Hurricanes are the most successful after their 2006 Stanley Cup championship marked the first professional sports title for the region. In 2019, a Major League Soccer team was awarded to Charlotte, and begin play in 2022.

Bank of America Stadium currently hosts three major sporting events, the Duke's Mayo Bowl, the Belk Kickoff Game and the ACC Championship Game.

Charlotte Motor Speedway hosts three major NASCAR events, the Coca-Cola 600, the NASCAR All-Star Race, and the Bank of America Roval 400.

== See also ==
- Appalachian English
- Cuisine of the Southern United States
- Great Wagon Road
- Politics of the Southern United States
- Southern American English
- The Californias
- The Canadas
- The Dakotas
- The Floridas
- The Virginias
