= Vampire: Dark Influences =

Vampire: Dark Influences is a 2006 board game for 2–5 players set in the White Wolf's World of Darkness universe.

== Reception ==
=== Reviews ===
- Flames Rising
- GamesFanatic.pl
- Rebel Times #3
