= Virginias =

Region in the United States

The Virginias
- Region
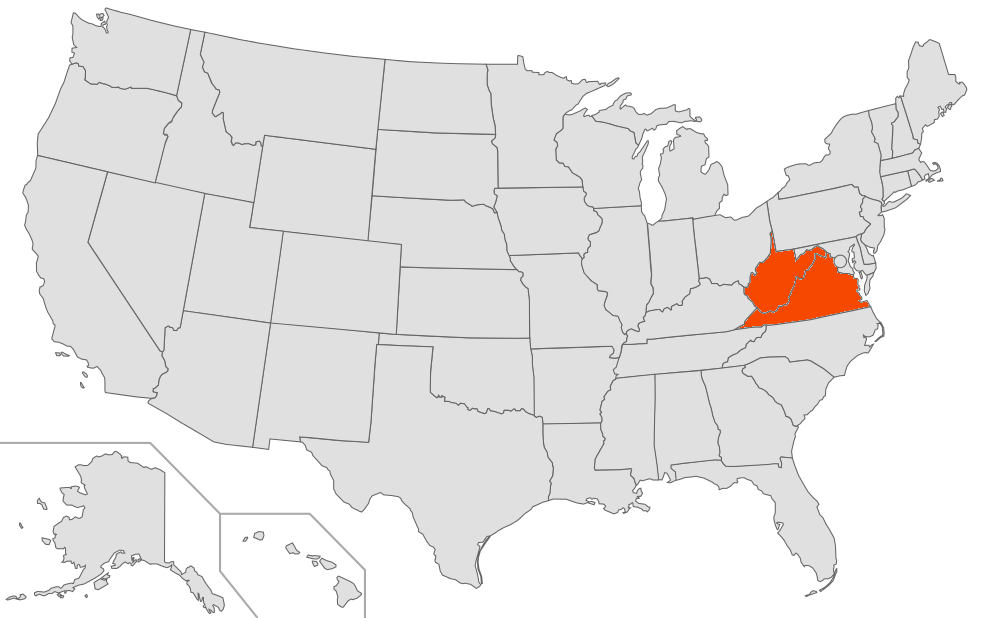
- Coordinates: 38.225°N 79.824°W
- Country: United States of America
- State: Virginia; West Virginia
- Principal cities: List: • Alexandria, VA; • Norfolk, VA; • Richmond, VA; • Roanoke, VA; • Virginia Beach, VA; • Charleston, WV; • Huntington, WV; • Morgantown, WV

Area
  - Total: 67,004.97 sq mi (173,542.1 km^{2})
  - Land: 63,528.30 sq mi (164,537.5 km^{2})
  - Water: 3,476.67 sq mi (9,004.5 km^{2})

Population (2019)
  - Total: 10,327,666
  - Density: 162.5680/sq mi (62.76784/km^{2})

The Virginias (sometimes also known as the two Virginias) is a region in the United States comprising the U.S. states of Virginia and West Virginia. If they were a single state (as they were until 1863), the Virginias would have a combined population of 10,425,109 as of 2020 United States census. This would give Virginia the 10th-largest population of any state, with 14,000 people less than the 9th, North Carolina. The total area of the two states is about 175,000 square kilometers (67,000 square miles).

The two states are currently politically opposites of each other. Starting in 2008, Virginia has always voted for the Democratic Party candidate and West Virginia has always voted for the Republican Party candidate in presidential elections.

== Vexit ==
Vexit is a proposed measure for Second Amendment sanctuary counties in Virginia to secede and join the neighboring, more conservative West Virginia over the issue of gun legislation.

== See also ==
- The Californias
- The Canadas
- The Carolinas
- The Dakotas
- The Floridas
- History of Virginia
