= En Route (Atlas Games) =

En Route is a 2001 role-playing game adventure published by Atlas Games.

== Plot summary ==
En Route is an adventure in which 21 short adventures can be used while traveling from one location to another.

== Reviews ==
- Pyramid
- Backstab
