= Over the Edge (game) =

Tabletop surrealist role-playing game by Jonathan Tweet

- First edition cover
- Designers: Robin Laws, Jonathan Tweet
- Publishers: Atlas Games
- Publication: 1992 1st edition; 1997 2nd edition; 2019 3rd edition
- Genres: Surreal conspiracy
- Systems: Custom (dice pool-based)

Over the Edge is a surreal role-playing game of secrets and conspiracies, taking place on the mysterious Island of Al Amarja. It was created by Jonathan Tweet with Robin Laws, and published by Atlas Games. Over The Edge departed from the model of predefined character attributes and skills, in favor of player-chosen traits; and was among the first to be based on the dice pool, where the number of dice rolled, rather than how they are interpreted, is determined by the characters' abilities.

Both Over the Edge and Vampire: The Masquerade were based upon a project between Jonathan Tweet and Mark Rein·Hagen which followed their development of Ars Magica for Lion Rampant. They share the concept of a dice pool, which they presumably inherit from that initial design. This game mechanic had previously been seen in West End Games' Ghostbusters and Star Wars, and FASA's Shadowrun roleplaying games.

While Vampire has achieved far more popularity, Over the Edge has distinguished itself with critical acclaim and has been acknowledged as a major source for the indie role-playing game movement.

Over the Edge was also the basis of the On the Edge collectible card game.

== System ==
Instead of representing characters using attributes and skills, characters are quantified with "traits" — freeform descriptors, like "Fireman", "Quick" or "Monster from another Dimension", which are created and defined by the player. Each character has one primary trait, two secondary traits, and one flaw. The primary trait is a superior attribute or ability that defines the character; the character gets an extra die when making rolls using it.

If a character attempts an action based on one of their traits, they get three six-sided dice to roll (or four dice for the primary trait). For most tasks where the traits don't apply, they get two dice. If an opponent is resisting the action, it is based on their roll instead.

If a character has a particular advantage, they may add a bonus die — they roll one more die, and discard the lowest roll. If they have a particular disadvantage (such as their flaw), they must add a penalty die — they roll one more die, and discard the highest roll.

In order to achieve a success, the player or Game Master needs to get a result equal to or greater than the difficulty number. For a routine or very easy task, the difficulty is 4; for an easy task, 7; for a moderately difficult task, 11; for a difficult task, 14; for a very difficult task, 18; and for a nearly impossible task, 21.

== Style ==
Tweet has stated that he designed Over the Edge to be more improvisational and open-ended than other role-playing games. On his website, he writes:

I designed Over the Edge to be crazy and spontaneous, so that's how I ran it. I'd generally mix alcohol, caffeine, and nicotine to get my head right for OTE. I invented whatever came to mind as we played, and wound up generating dozens of weird clues to uninvented mysteries, many of which the players never followed up. The setting was a challenge enough, so I didn't feel I needed to present the players with hard-edged combat challenges. There were plenty of fights, but the challenge was to get into the right fights more than it was to win a particular fight.

== Setting ==
Al Amarja – where nightmares go to breed

The game is set in the fictitious Mediterranean island of Al Amarja.

=== Geography ===
Al Amarja is an independent island state in the southern Mediterranean. The western side of the island is covered by three interconnected cities (from north to south): the port town of Skylla, the slums of The Edge and the tract housing of bourgeois Traboc. Most of the population lives there.

Much like Italy's Venice is slowly being claimed by the sea, The Edge is slowly sliding off of a cliff. Erosion of the cliffside, frequent violent earthquakes, the occasional eruption of Mount Ralsius, and a mushrooming population is slowly accelerating its collapse. At the eastern fringes of The Edge is The 'Burbs, the home of the embattled aspirational middle class.

The Brink, the terraced cliff-face to the west of The Edge, is the home of the Garbagemen, Al Amarja's strange Untouchables caste. They perform a wide variety of tasks considered spiritually "unclean" or beneath the dignity of other Marjans. This includes any task involving wastes of any kind, like sanitation and recycling, appliance repair, or plumbing and HVAC. There are a large number of them working at The Terminal in tasks like preparing or handling fast food or working as janitors, custodians, and baggage handlers.

Freedom City, the capital of Al Amarja, is on the eastern end of the island and was inspired by Washington D.C. It consists mainly of stately government buildings and the opulent homes of government officials, surrounded by the rickety slums that house the government employees. The only difference between Washington D.C. and Freedom City is here the drug dens and brothels are in the good part of town and are very exclusive.

The two ends of the island are linked by the "October 7th Memorial Highway" along the northern coast and "Freedom Road" along the southern coast. The rest of the island is undeveloped hilly forest, at the center of which lies an extinct volcano called Mount Ralsius.

The French version of the game (called Conspirations) shifted the position of Al Amarja to the Caribbean for the same reasons it was placed in the Mediterranean sea in the original. It is an exotic place in an area of numerous islands sufficiently unfamiliar to the target audience, next to big nations where many cultures and societies mix.

=== History ===
During its history, Al Amarja has been colonized and conquered in succession by Greeks, Romans, North African Muslims, Catalans, Castilians, various Italian states and eventually the newly unified Italy.

The official history of the island states that on October 7, 1940, Her Exaltedness Monique D'Aubainne, the Current Shepherdess of Al Amarja and president-for-life, drove out the fascists with the aid of her bodyguards, the Loyal Defenders. In reality, she just bought the island from her lover, Benito Mussolini. She founded the new state and legislation after the war using the newly ascendant United States as a model.

=== Politics ===
Al Amarja is an independent state. It is not a member of the United Nations or any other international body. It does not maintain embassies anywhere in the world.

Al Amarja is also a center of just about every kind of global conspiracy imaginable and all of them have their own operatives on the island.

The nation is ruled by Her Exaltedness Monique D'Aubainne, Historic Liberator and Current Shepherdess of Al Amarja (utmost respect is due Her Exaltedness). She is like the Queen of England in that she's a pleasant-seeming elderly woman who technically rules the country and occasionally appears on TV to make speeches. Like the Queen, she has several middle-aged heirs who await her death so they can take over. Her son Jean-Christophe D'Aubainne, the eldest, is an eclectic architect who designed the D'Aubainne International Airport (colloquially called The Terminal). Overseeing the constant obsessive cleaning, maintenance, and modification (or "perfecting") of the facility takes up all his time. He has been known to agonize for hours over the proper aesthetic placement of a lightswitch. Her elder daughter Constance D'Aubainne lives in Golden Barrio, the business district of The Edge. She owns SWAPS, the largest office building in the barrio, where anything can be bought or sold. Her younger daughter Cheryl D'Aubainne lives in Flowers Barrio, the artistic district. She holds court in the Temple of the Divine Experience in Sunken Barrio, the tourist district, and has strong ties with the island's Mystic Shit and Fringe communities.

=== Language ===
Al Amarja's official language is American English. It was adopted following Her Exaltedness' wholesale embracing of American culture and enforced by the shadowy Language Police. Fearful of being considered disloyal, many 'Marjians translated their names into English or randomly selected English words from the dictionary as first or last names.

Al Amarjan patois (called 'Marjan) has numerous loan words from just about any other language in the world. A particular word or phrase might use various languages' versions of it to imply subtext. An example would be the word for "Yes" — the English "Yes" is used for simple confirmation, the French "Oui" is used to imply apathy or boredom, the Spanish "Si!" is grudging compliance, the Russian "Da" is used for dejected acceptance of the inevitable, and the Japanese "Hai" is selected for enthusiastic agreement.

=== Economy ===
Al Amarja uses the American Dollar as its standard currency. In fact the American government prints up batches of their currency explicitly for their internal use. However, the coins and bills have Her Exaltedness' face on all the denominations and use 'Marjan landmarks on the obverse side.

Al Amarja gets its income from various sources — decadent tourists, private donations and investments, legal and illicit business, smuggled ivory and other forbidden animal products, lecherous sailors, expense accounts of various operatives and pirated products. Businesses like the lack of any copyright or trademark laws, absence of safety regulations and labor laws, and easily bribed law enforcement.

=== Laws ===
Guns, explosives and bulletproof vests are illegal. Only the Peace Force, the island's heavily armed law enforcement agency, can carry guns and they enforce this law very vigorously. A person caught "carrying black" ('Marjan patois for possessing a firearm) will be at least arrested and possibly shot on sight if seen openly carrying one. However blades and clubs can be openly carried anywhere.

Drug laws are similar to those in Europe and United States but enforced only sporadically. Most 'Marjans use drugs on a daily basis. Visitors new to Al Amarja must specify when ordering an open-container beverage of any kind whether they want it "jumped" (spiked with a stimulant drug), "deep" (spiked with a narcotic or depressant drug), or "sharp" (unadulterated).

Otherwise the police and government lets everybody do whatever they want unless it threatens the state or they have something to gain in stopping it. After all, that is the main reason visitors come here.

=== Population ===
The mixed history of the island means that locals look like a mix of various racial characteristics. The current population of Al Amarja has also been increased by a mix of Mediterranean, European, and some recent North American, Asian and Sub-Saharan African immigrants. They also include mutants, maniacs, outlawed psychics, magicians, intelligence and conspiracy operatives, fringe scientists, unscrupulous businessmen, rich patrons and anything else. There are no accurate census numbers.

Al Amarjans – also known as 'Marjans – are rough people. Self-expression is common to the point of self-indulgence. Instead of neckties, they wear a noose around their neck; nooses previously used to hang criminals are very prized. Knives and steel-reinforced boots are universal accessories. Street fights and bar brawls are common entertainment. Because of the common mutual hostility and suspicion, it is a custom to serve beverages and snacks in their original containers.

Al Amarjans practice just about any religion from Christian Science to human sacrifice. They include Satanists and "Sommerites", religiously oriented fans of rock star Karla Sommers. The Temple of the Divine Experience, a multi-religious worship center and dance club, is the only official place of worship in Al Amarja.

== Product catalogue ==
=== Core books ===
- AG2000 Over the Edge, 1992, ISBN 1-887801-01-4
- AG2002 Over the Edge Second Edition, 1997, ISBN 1-887801-52-9
- AG2012 Over the Edge 20th Anniversary Edition, 2012, limited edition of 400 copies, ISBN 1-58978-127-9 & ISBN 978-1-58978-127-6

=== Supplements ===
- AG2010 Player's Survival Guide, 1993, ISBN 1-887801-02-2

=== Sourcebooks ===
- AG2300 Wildest Dreams, 1993, ISBN 1-887801-11-1
- AG2301 Weather the Cuckoo Likes, 1994 ISBN 1-887801-12-X
- AG2302 Friend Or Foe?, 1994, ISBN 1-887801-13-8
- AG2303 Cloaks, 1998, ISBN 1-887801-61-8
- AG2304 At Your Service, 2001, ISBN 1-887801-64-2

=== Scenarios ===
- AG2100 New Faces, 1992, ISBN 1-887801-03-0
- AG2101 Airwaves, 1993, ISBN 1-887801-04-9
- AG2102 House Call, 1993, ISBN 1-887801-05-7
- AG2103 Unauthorized Broadcast, 1993, ISBN 1-887801-06-5
- AG2104 It Waits..., 1993, ISBN 1-887801-07-3
- AG2150 The Myth Of Self, 1995, ISBN 1-887801-08-1
- AG2151 Forgotten Lives, 1997, ISBN 1-887801-51-0
- AG2200 Welcome to Sylvan Pines, 1993, ISBN 1-887801-09-X
- AG2201 With A Long Spoon, 1994, ISBN 1-887801-10-3

=== Fiction ===
- AG2700 Pierced Heart by Robin D. Laws, 1996, ISBN 1-887801-54-5

== Reception ==
In Issue 75 of the French games magazine Casus Belli, Pierre Rosenthal commented, "As for the game system, it is undoubtedly one of the simplest ever designed (apart from the combat system which seems to have been added after the fact)." Rosenthal noted, "It is above all about an adult universe, where the notions of power, money, sex or drugs are not highlighted, but shown in a rather realistic light (sometimes a little surrealist too)." Rosenthal concluded on an ambivalent note, saying, "It should interest everyone who wants to play 'something else'. Only problem: the book's organization is deplorable — I have rarely had so much trouble finding information in a game."

Sam Hildebrand-Chupp reviewed Over the Edge in White Wolf #37 (July/Aug., 1993), rating it a 4 out of 5 and stated that "To sum up, Over the Edge is a brilliantly designed roleplaying game, complete with its own setting. However, the game requires an expert GM, some find role-players and at least a passing interest in the kind of stories that you can participate in on Al Amarja. I would heartily recommend this game to those of you who enjoy the books of William Burroughs, movies like Brazil, television shows like The Prisoner and games like Paranoia."

In Issue 9 of Shadis, Jolly Blackburn noted, "Over the Edge has a lot going for it. It plays fast and loose with game rules (not just its own rules, but the concept of rules) and with reality on nearly every level." Blackburn examined the game system and commented, "Two concepts underlie the rules: simplicity and open-endedness. The idea is to allow players to play any type of character they wish, and allow them to do so in a way that stresses role-playing by eliminating distracting intrusions of rules on the game. I liked these aspects. However, there are many who disagree with this set of mechanics, and would argue that the philosophy behind the rules is flawed. If you tend to follow the school of thought that believes detailed rules are more important to emphasize role-playing, you are sure to dislike these rules." Blackburn concluded, "If you like games with deeply-entrenched 'realism', detailed combat, and mechanics that cover every detail of your game, Over the Edge probably isn't for you. If you can't stand the unusual, you will probably dislike the game. But if you want a game that plays quickly and in an unpredictable setting, Over the Edge is an excellent choice."

In the October 1994 issue of Dragon (Issue 210), Rick Swan commented on the originality of the game, saying, "To call the Over the Edge game one-of-a-kind is like calling King Kong a one-of-a-kind monkey." Swan liked the game, but admitted that he "had trouble getting a game off the ground," saying, "I couldn't make sense of the characters (understandable since PCs can be anything from Green Berets to talking cats.)" However, Swan concluded that "With its engaging setting and tidal wave of ideas, I’m surprised that the OTE game hasn't gotten more attention. Though not for beginners — the freeform style requires both the referee and the players to fine-tune the rules as they go along — veterans should go for this in a big way, particularly those with a penchant for the bizarre." Swan thought the supplementary Players' Survival Guide was indispensable for playing Over the Edge, saying, "Maybe you can navigate the OTE rule book without the Players' Survival Guide, but I couldn't. Get 'em both."

In a 1996 readers' poll undertaken by Arcane magazine to determine the 50 most popular roleplaying games of all time, Over the Edge was ranked 28th. Editor Paul Pettengale commented: "A fine, twisted game, with enough happening to keep players confused for years. And the rules system is a beauty. PCs are defined by a handful of abilities which you invent to suit yourself, plus some personal history to give the ref some hooks; virtually everything is resolved by rolling a small number of six-sided dice. Fast, easy to play and hard to fathom."

The reviewer from Pyramid #29 (Jan./Feb., 1998) stated that "Over the Edge concentrates on roleplaying. The hardest part of creating a character is your character concept. After that, the numbers are easy because the game has a very short, simple, loose and flexible game system."

In Issue 7 of the French games magazine Backstab, Michael Croitoilu reviewed the second edition of this game and noted, "Although this second edition above all corrects the aesthetics of the first, it is also enriched with a summary table of the relationships between each group of conspirators and integrates references to the various supplements of the range." Croitoilu concluded by giving this game an excellent rating of 9 out of 10, saying, "Equipped with a game system of unequaled simplicity and an exhaustive background, Over the Edge remains an excellent game that I cannot recommend enough."

In his 2023 book Monsters, Aliens, and Holes in the Ground, RPG historian Stu Horvath noted, "The system is designed to fade into the background and facilitate freewheeling play, a feature that, no doubt, inspired indie game designers in the next decade. The setting, with all of its hooks and suggested mysteries, is the main attraction, less as a place to explore and more as a venue to inflict that system upon, like a firing range or a tropical atoll." However, Horvath found the setting devoid of extreme edges, pointing out, "There is no mention of fetishes of any sort or even nods to musical subcultures, like punk and goth, which are common in other '90s RPGs ... For an island that professes to be so interested in excess and freedom from conventionality, the details all seem oddly square."

== Other reviews and commentary ==
- Rollespilsmagasinet Fønix (Danish) (Issue 1 - March/April 1994)
- Polyhedron #85
- Abyss Quarterly #50 (Winter, 1992)
