= On the Edge (game) =

Collectible card game

- Card back for On the Edge CCG
- Designers: John Nephew and Jonathan Tweet
- Publishers: Atlas Games
- Players: 2-5
- Playing time: Approx 45 min
- Chance: Some
- Age range: 12+
- Skills: Card playing Arithmetic; Basic Reading Ability

On The Edge is an out-of-print collectible card game released in 1994, not long after Magic: The Gathering. The setting and characters were based on the RPG titled Over the Edge. The game's story was set on an island in the southern Mediterranean called Al Amarja, where various factions were fighting for control.

== History ==
When Atlas Games did not have the finances to publish On the Edge, they partnered with Jerry Corrick and Bob Brynildson and formed a new corporation called Trident, Inc. to publish the game.

== Products ==
The product line consisted of four series and was supported by a player's guide.

=== Core Version ===
The game launched in 1994 with the core series, titled On the Edge. This series included starter decks and booster packs. The starter decks contained 60 randomized cards and the rulesheet in a cardboard tuckbox. The booster packs were made up of 10 randomized cards in a foil sleeve.

The starter decks were sold to retailers in display boxes of 10 starters. For the booster decks, the display boxes containing 60 boosters packs.

Limited Version was released in October 1994 and contains 269 cards. The card titles are printed in gold letters. The Limited Version had the mid rarity of all three series.

The second release was the Unlimited Version and also contains 269 cards. The card titles are printed in yellow letters. The Unlimited Version had the least rarity of all three series. The starter decks and booster packs have "Unlimited Version" printed on the boxes/packs.

The third printing was the Standard Version and contains 270 cards and was released in February 1995. In addition to the cards found in Limited and Unlimited, it has card #270, Resounding Bell. Card titles are printed in yellow letters, and each card has a copyright 1995 notice printed at the bottom. The Standard Version had the most rarity of all three series. The starter decks and booster packs have "Standard Version" printed on the boxes/packs.

=== The Cut-Ups Project ===
The first expansion, created by Robin D. Laws, was called The Cut-Ups Project. Coming out in 1995, it added 90 new cards to the game. These cards were sold in randomized booster packs of 10 cards.

This expansion added even more strangeness to the game's already bizarre cosmology in the form of talking dogs, diabolical beverages, and creatures that fell from the sky.

Retail display boxes of this expansion contained 60 booster packs. Card numbers in this set are preceded by a "C".

=== Shadows ===
The second expansion, designed by game co-creator Jonathan Tweet, added another 117 cards to the game. This time the focus was on the minions and dark conspirators of Al Amarja.

These set contained only booster packs of 10 randomized cards. As with the previous expansions, the retailer displays contained 60 packs each. Card numbers in this set are preceded by a "D".

=== Arcana ===
The third expansion, by game co-creator John Nephew, focused on the strange energies of the island such as magic and psychic powers. The set followed the standard set by the rest of the line by adding 153 new cards. These were sold in 10-card booster packs. Retail displays contained 60 of these booster packs. Card numbers in this set are preceded by an "A".

=== Surviving On the Edge ===
The only print product made in support of the line, Surviving On the Edge provided tips, strategy, errata, card lists, and rule variations for the game. This 287 page digest-sized book was written by Peter Hentges. While containing detailed information and tips regarding the cards, the Arcana series was not included at the time of printing.

=== The Burger Box ===
The Burger Box is an introductory set that contains decks and packs from the various expansions.

Each Burger Box contained a random assortment of the following:

- 6 Standard Starter Decks
- 12 Standard Booster Packs
- 12 Cut-Ups Project Booster Packs
- 12 Shadows Booster Packs
- 12 Arcana Booster Packs

The Burger Box was released in 1996 and was the last product in the line.

An expansion titled Wetworks was scheduled for a late 1996 release but never materialized.

== Reception ==
Derek Pearcy reviewed On the Edge for Pyramid #15 (Sept./Oct., 1995) and stated that "All in all, the On the Edge product line is one of the most varied and well-supported trading card games out there. It takes a little investment in time but, since the game is both available and popular, not hardly so much in money as most other games - and there is no lack of adversaries to fight with over control of Al Amarja."
