= Atlas Games =

Roleplaying, card and board game publisher

Atlas Games is a company which publishes role-playing games, board games and card games. Its founder and current president is John Nephew.

== History ==
When Atlas Games did not have the finances to publish On the Edge (1994), they partnered with Jerry Corrick and Bob Brynildson and formed a new corporation called Trident, Inc. to publish the game. Eventually Atlas subsumed into Trident; Brynildson, Corrick, and their store - The Source Comics & Games - continued to support Atlas with their business experience and perspective.

The company published the periodical EdgeWork for four issues.

== Games published ==
=== Role-playing games ===
- Ars Magica (The 5th edition won the 2004 Origins Award for Best Role-Playing Game.)
- Feng Shui (The 2nd edition won the Gold ENnie Awards in 2016 for Best Rules and Best Setting.)
- Furry Pirates (Swashbuckling Adventure in the Furry Age of Piracy)
- Magical Kitties Save the Day
- Northern Crown
- Over the Edge
- Pandemonium (Adventures in Tabloid World)
- Unknown Armies

=== Licensed settings and adventures ===
- Nyambe - D20 system campaign setting
- Fantasy Bestiary and adventures for D20
- Official adventures for Cyberpunk 2020

=== Board games ===
- Cults Across America
- Dungeoneer
- Recess!

=== Card games ===
- Beer Money
- Cthulhu 500 (2004 Origins Award for Best Traditional Card Game)
- Gloom (2005 Origins Award for Traditional Card Game of the Year)
- Lunch Money (Tied for 1996 Origins Award for Best Card Game)
- Lunch Money: Sticks and Stones
- On the Edge Collectible Card Game
- Once Upon a Time
- Once Upon a Time: Dark Tales
- Spammers

=== Other games ===
- Pieces of Eight (Winner of an Origins Vanguard Award)
- Seismic (by Ted Alspach)

== See also ==
- In the Belly of the Beast (Atlas Games)
- The Tide of Years
- En Route (Atlas Games)
