= Lovecraftian horror =

Subgenre of horror

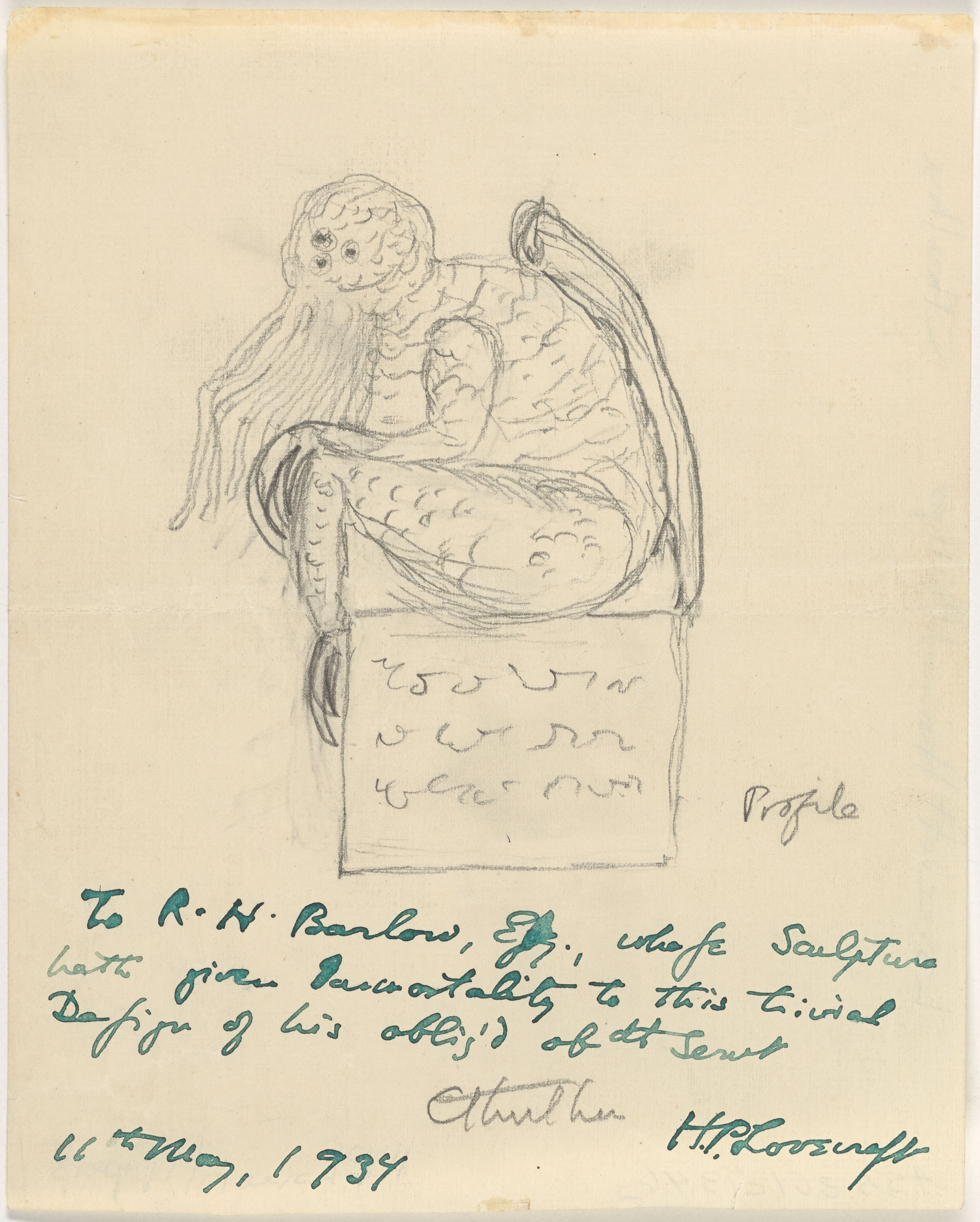
A 1934 drawing by Lovecraft of Cthulhu, the central cosmic entity in Lovecraft's seminal short story, "The Call of Cthulhu", first published in the pulp magazine Weird Tales in 1928

Lovecraftian horror, also called cosmic horror or eldritch horror, is a subgenre of horror, fantasy, and weird fiction originating from the United States that emphasizes the horror of the unknowable and incomprehensible more than gore or other elements of shock. It is named after 20th-century American author H. P. Lovecraft, whose work emphasizes strange and eldritch (unnatural) phenomena, with themes of cosmic dread, forbidden and dangerous knowledge, madness, non-human influences on humanity, religion and superstition, fate and inevitability, and the risks associated with scientific discoveries, which are now associated with Lovecraftian horror as a subgenre. The cosmic themes of Lovecraftian horror can also be found in other media, notably horror films, horror games, and comics.

== Themes ==
The oldest and strongest emotion of mankind is fear, and the oldest and strongest kind of fear is fear of the unknown.

— H.P. Lovecraft, Supernatural Horror in Literature

Attack the story like a radiant suicide, utter the great NO to life without weakness; then you will see a magnificent cathedral, and your senses, vectors of unutterable derangement, will map out an integral delirium that will be lost in the unnameable architecture of time.

— Michel Houellebecq, H. P. Lovecraft: Against the World, Against Life

The core themes and atmosphere of cosmic horror were laid out by Lovecraft himself in "Supernatural Horror in Literature", his essay on gothic, weird, and horror fiction. A number of characteristics have been identified as being associated with Lovecraftian horror:

- Fear of the unknown and unknowable.
- The "fear and awe we feel when confronted by phenomena beyond our comprehension, whose scope extends beyond the narrow field of human affairs and boasts of cosmic significance". Here horror derives from the realization that human interests, desires, laws and morality have no meaning or significance in the universe-at-large. Consequently, it has been noted that the entities in Lovecraft's books were not evil. They were simply far beyond human conceptions of morality.
- A "contemplation of mankind's place in the vast, comfortless universe revealed by modern science" in which the horror springs from "the discovery of appalling truth".
- A naturalistic fusion of horror and science fiction in which presumptions about the nature of reality are "eroded".
- That "technological and social progress since Classical times has facilitated the repression of an awareness of the magnitude and malignity of the macrocosm in which the human microcosm is contained", or in other words, a calculated repression of the horrifying nature of the cosmos as a reaction to its "essential awfulness."
- Having protagonists who are helpless in the face of unfathomable and inescapable powers, which reduce humans from a privileged position to insignificance and incompetence. Unlike traditional moral or Christian dualism of light versus darkness, this cosmic horror stems from rational individuals confronting an amoral, indifferent cosmos, often resulting in madness or death.
- Preoccupation with visceral textures, protean semi-gelatinous substances and slime, as opposed to other horror elements such as blood, bones, or corpses.
- Focus on psychological deterioration and cognitive decay, wherein the horror derives from the protagonist's mental breakdown, loss of language, and erosion of sanity upon confronting the unknown, prioritizing internal psychological reaction over physical descriptions of the entities.

== Origin ==
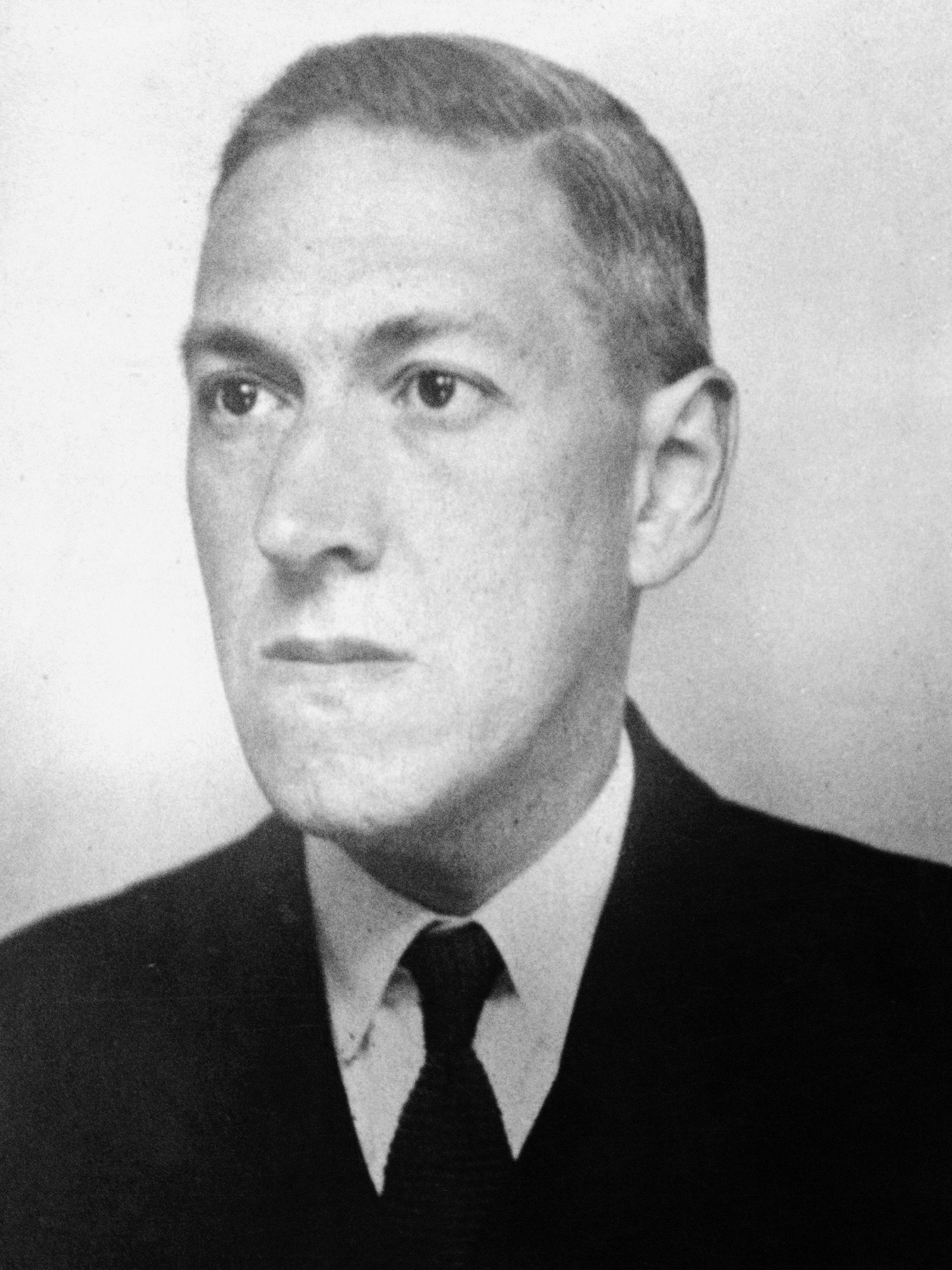
H. P. Lovecraft in June 1934

=== Cosmic Horror before Lovecraft ===
While popularized by Lovecraft, he was not the first to write Cosmic Horror. 1833's MS. Found in a Bottle, written by Edgar Allan Poe, has precursor elements of Cosmic Horror, with the ship which rescued the protagonist sailing towards a secret which will lead to its doom. 1906's Lazarus, by Leonid Andreyev, sees a resurrected Lazarus of Bethany impart a vision of a future where particles will separate from one another and even particles' particles will separate to whoever look at his eyes, leading people to madness.

Some of these precursors to Cosmic and Lovecraftian horror directly influenced Lovecraft. The Horla, a short horror where a man possessed by an entity is slowly driven mad, was a direct influence to The Call of Cthulhu. The King in Yellow, a play which lead to the insanity of anyone who reads it, was also very influential to Lovecraft and eventually became part of the mythos.

=== Lovecraftian Horror ===
H. P. Lovecraft refined this style of storytelling into his own Cthulhu Mythos that involved a set of weird, pre-human, and extraterrestrial elements. His work was influenced by authors such as Edgar Allan Poe, Algernon Blackwood, Ambrose Bierce, Arthur Machen, Robert W. Chambers, and Lord Dunsany. However, Lovecraft was keen to distinguish his work from existing gothic and supernatural fiction, elevating the horror, in his own words, to a "cosmic" level. Stephen King has said the best of Lovecraft's works are "uniquely terrible in all of American literature, and survive with all their power intact."

The hallmark of Lovecraft's work is cosmicism, the sense that ordinary life is a thin shell over a reality that is so alien and abstract in comparison that merely contemplating it would damage the sanity of the ordinary person, insignificance and powerlessness at the cosmic scale, and uncompromising negativity. Author China Miéville notes that "Lovecraft's horror is not one of intrusion but of realization. The world has always been implacably bleak; the horror lies in our acknowledging that fact." Many of Lovecraft's stories are set in New England.

=== Collaborators and followers ===
Much of Lovecraft's influence is secondary, as he was a friend, inspiration, and correspondent to many authors who developed their own notable works. Many of these writers also worked with Lovecraft on jointly written stories. His more famous friends and collaborators include Robert Bloch, author of Psycho; Robert E. Howard, creator of Conan the Barbarian; and August Derleth, who focused on extending the Cthulhu Mythos.

Subsequent horror writers also heavily drew on Lovecraft's work. While many made direct references to elements of Lovecraft's mythos, either to draw on its associations or to acknowledge his influence, many others drew on the feel and tone of his work without specifically referring to mythos elements. Some have said that Lovecraft, along with Edgar Allan Poe, is the most influential author on modern horror. Author Stephen King has said: "Now that time has given us some perspective on his work, I think it is beyond doubt that H. P. Lovecraft has yet to be surpassed as the Twentieth Century's greatest practitioner of the classic horror tale."

By the late 20th century, Lovecraft had become something of a pop-culture icon, resulting in countless reinterpretations of and references to his work. Many of these fall outside the sphere of Lovecraftian horror, but represent Cthulhu Mythos in popular culture.

=== Literature and art ===
Lovecraft's work, mostly published in pulp magazines, never had the same sort of influence on literature as his high-modernist literary contemporaries such as Ernest Hemingway and F. Scott Fitzgerald. However, his impact is still broadly and deeply felt in some of the most celebrated authors of contemporary fiction. The fantasias of Jorge Luis Borges display a marked resemblance to some of Lovecraft's more dream-influenced work. Borges also dedicated his story, "There Are More Things" to Lovecraft, though he also considered Lovecraft "an involuntary parodist of Poe." The French novelist Michel Houellebecq has also cited Lovecraft as an influence in his essay H. P. Lovecraft: Against the World, Against Life in which he refers to the stories written in the last ten years of Lovecraft's life as "the great texts".

Lovecraft's penchant for dreamscapes and for the biologically macabre has also profoundly influenced visual artists such as Jean "Moebius" Giraud and H. R. Giger. Giger's book of paintings which led directly to many of the designs for the film Alien was named Necronomicon, the name of a fictional book in several of Lovecraft's mythos stories. Dan O'Bannon, the original writer of the Alien screenplay, has also mentioned Lovecraft as a major influence on the film. With Ronald Shusett, he would later write Dead & Buried and Bleeders (film), both of which were admitted pastiches of Lovecraft.

The Call of Poohthulhu, an anthology of Lovecraftian horror short stories set in the Winnie-the-Pooh universe, was published in 2022.

== Comics ==
Lovecraftian horror has influenced the medium of comics. This has included not only adaptations of his stories, such as H. P. Lovecraft's Worlds, H. P. Lovecraft's Cthulhu: The Whisperer in Darkness, Graphic Classics: H. P. Lovecraft, and MAX's Haunt of Horror, but also the incorporation of the Mythos into new stories.

Alan Moore has touched on Lovecraftian themes, in particular in his The Courtyard and Yuggoth Cultures and Other Growths (and Antony Johnston's spin-off Yuggoth Creatures), but also in his Black Dossier where the story "What Ho, Gods of the Abyss?" mixed Lovecraftian horror with Bertie Wooster. Neonomicon and Providence posit a world where the Mythos, while existing as fiction written by Lovecraft, is also very real.

As well as appearing with Fort in two comics stories, Lovecraft has appeared as a character in a number of Lovecraftian comics. He appears in Mac Carter and Tony Salmons's limited series The Strange Adventures of H. P. Lovecraft from Image and in the Arcana children's graphic novel Howard and the Frozen Kingdom from Bruce Brown. A webcomic, Lovecraft is Missing, debuted in 2008 and takes place in 1926, before the publication of "The Call of Cthulhu", and weaves in elements of Lovecraft's earlier stories.

Boom! Studios have also run a number of series based on Cthulhu and other characters from the Mythos, including Cthulhu Tales and Fall of Cthulhu.

The creator of Hellboy, Mike Mignola, has described the books as being influenced primarily by the works of Lovecraft, in addition to those of Robert E. Howard and the legend of Dracula. This was adapted into the 2004 film Hellboy. His Elseworlds mini-series The Doom That Came to Gotham reimagines Batman in a confrontation with Lovecraftian monsters.

Gou Tanabe has adapted some of Lovecraft's tales into manga.

Issue #32 of The Brave and the Bold was heavily influenced by the works and style of Lovecraft. In addition to using pastiches of Cthulhu, the Deep Ones, and R'lyeh, writer J. Michael Straczynski also wrote the story in a distinctly Lovecraftian style. Written entirely from the perspective of a traumatized sailor, the story makes use of several of Lovecraft's trademarks, including the ultimate feeling of insignificance in the face of the supernatural.

== Film and television ==
From the 1950s onward, in the era following Lovecraft's death, Lovecraftian horror truly became a subgenre, not only fueling direct cinematic adaptations of Poe and Lovecraft, but providing the foundation upon which many of the horror films of the 1950s and 1960s were constructed.

=== 1960s ===
A filmmaker who devoted effort to the Lovecraftian was 1960s B-filmmaker Roger Corman, with his The Haunted Palace (1963) being very loosely based on The Case of Charles Dexter Ward, and his X: The Man with the X-ray Eyes featuring a protagonist driven to insanity by heightened vision that allows him to see God at the heart of the universe.

Though not direct adaptations, the episodes of the well-known series The Outer Limits often had Lovecraftian themes, such as human futility and insignificance and the limits of sanity and understanding.

Amongst the other adaptations of this era are Dark Intruder (1965) which has some passing references to the Cthulhu Mythos; 1965 also saw Boris Karloff and Nick Adams in Die, Monster, Die! based on Lovecraft's short story "The Colour Out of Space"; The Shuttered Room (1967), based on an August Derleth "posthumous collaboration" with Lovecraft, and Curse of the Crimson Altar (U.S. title: The Crimson Cult) (1968), based on "The Dreams in the Witch House".

=== 1970s ===
The 1970s produced a number of films that have been classified as Lovecraftian horror. This includes the themes of human fragility, impotence in the face of the unknowable, and lack of answers in Picnic at Hanging Rock, and The Dunwich Horror, with its source in Lovecraft's work and emphasis on "forces beyond the protagonist's control." The 1979 film Alien has been described as Lovecraftian due to its theme of "cosmic indifference", the "monumental bleakness" of its setting, and leaving most questions unanswered.

Rod Serling's 1969–1973 series Night Gallery adapted at least two Lovecraft stories, "Pickman's Model" and "Cool Air". The episode "Professor Peabody's Last Lecture", concerning the fate of a man who read the Necronomicon, included a student named "Mr. Lovecraft", along with other students sharing names of authors in the Lovecraft Circle.

=== 1980s ===
In 1981, The Evil Dead comedy horror film franchise was created by Sam Raimi after studying H. P. Lovecraft. It consists of the films The Evil Dead (1981), Evil Dead II (1987), and Army of Darkness (1992). The Necronomicon Ex-Mortis, or simply The Book of the Dead, is depicted in each of the three films.

John Carpenter's "Apocalypse Trilogy" (The Thing, Prince of Darkness and In the Mouth of Madness) feature Lovecraftian elements, which become more noticeable in each film. His 1980 film The Fog also features Lovecraftian elements in the glowing fog that terrorizes the town.

The blackly comedic Re-Animator (1985) was based on Lovecraft's novella Herbert West–Reanimator. Re-Animator spawned two sequel films.

Released in 1986, From Beyond was loosely based on Lovecraft's short story of the same name.

The 1987 film The Curse was an adaptation of Lovecraft's "The Colour Out of Space". Its sequel, Curse II: The Bite was loosely inspired by "The Curse of Yig", originally a collaboration between Lovecraft and Zealia Bishop.

=== 1990s ===
The 1991 HBO film Cast a Deadly Spell starred Fred Ward as Harry Phillip Lovecraft, a noir detective investigating the theft of the Necronomicon in an alternate universe 1948 Los Angeles where magic was commonplace. The sequel Witch Hunt had Dennis Hopper as H. Phillip Lovecraft in a story set two years later.

1992's The Resurrected, directed by Dan O'Bannon, is an adaptation of Lovecraft's novel The Case of Charles Dexter Ward. It contains numerous elements faithful to Lovecraft's story, though the studio made major cuts to the film.

The self-referential Necronomicon (1993), featured Lovecraft himself as a character, played by Jeffrey Combs. The three stories in Necronomicon are based on two H. P. Lovecraft short stories and one Lovecraft novella: "The Drowned" is based on "The Rats in the Walls", "The Cold" is based on "Cool Air", and "Whispers" is based on The Whisperer in Darkness.

1994's The Lurking Fear is an adaptation of Lovecraft's story "The Lurking Fear". It has some elements faithful to Lovecraft's story, while being hijacked by a crime caper subplot.

1995's Castle Freak is loosely inspired by Lovecraft's story "The Outsider".

=== 2000s ===
This period saw a few films using Lovecraftian horror themes. 2007's The Mist, Frank Darabont's movie adaptation of Stephen King's 1985 novella by the same name, featuring otherworldly Lovecraftian monsters emerging from a thick blanket of mist to terrify a small New England town, and 2005's The Call of Cthulhu, made by the H. P. Lovecraft Historical Society, a black and white adaptation using silent film techniques to mimic the feel of a film that might have been made in the 1920s, at the time that Lovecraft's story was written.

2001's Dagon is a Spanish-made horror film directed by Stuart Gordon. Though titled after Lovecraft's story "Dagon", the film is actually an effective adaptation of his story The Shadow over Innsmouth.

Cthulhu is a 2000 Australian low budget horror film directed, produced, and written by Damian Heffernan. It is mostly based on two Lovecraft stories, "The Thing on the Doorstep" and The Shadow over Innsmouth.

2007's Cthulhu, directed by Dan Gildark, is loosely based on the novella The Shadow over Innsmouth (1936). The film is notable among works adapted from Lovecraft's work for having a gay protagonist.

=== 2010s ===
Since 2010 a number of popular films have used elements of cosmic horror, notably Alex Garland's Annihilation (based on the 2014 novel of the same name by Jeff VanderMeer) with its strong themes of incomprehensibility and outside influence on Earth. Robert Eggers' 2019 movie The Lighthouse has been compared to Lovecraft's works due to the dreary atmosphere, deep sea horror imagery and the otherworldly and maddening power of the titular lighthouse that drives the protagonists to insanity. Ridley Scott's 2012 science-fiction horror epic Prometheus and Gore Verbinski's 2016 film A Cure for Wellness have been noted for their Lovecraftian elements. HBO's 2019 miniseries Chernobyl has been described as "the new face of cosmic horror", with radiation filling the role of an incomprehensible, untamable, indifferent terror.

The films of Panos Cosmatos, Beyond the Black Rainbow and Mandy take cosmic horror themes and blend them with psychedelic and new age elements, while the work of Justin Benson and Aaron Moorhead in Resolution, Spring, and The Endless has also been described as "Lovecraftian."

Other films directly incorporating or adapting the work of Lovecraft include the 2011 film The Whisperer in Darkness based on Lovecraft's short story of the same name, the 2017 Finnish short film Sound from the Deep incorporating elements from At the Mountains of Madness in a modern-day setting, and Richard Stanley's Colour Out of Space based on Lovecraft's short story "The Colour Out of Space". Of note also is Drew Goddard's 2012 film The Cabin in the Woods, a comedy horror which deliberately subverts cosmic horror conventions and tropes. The concept of a sky-creature was part of an homage to the imagery evoked by H. P. Lovecraft in the 2010 film Altitude a Canadian horror direct-to-video film directed by Canadian comic book writer and artist Kaare Andrews.

=== 2020s ===
William Eubank, director of the 2020 film Underwater and Chad Ferrin director of film The Deep Ones have confirmed that the creatures of their films are tied to the Cthulhu Mythos.

Masking Threshold (2021) uses Lovecraftian story elements. Director and writer Johannes Grenzfurthner confirms the influence in interviews. Churuli (2021) an Indian Malayalam-language film directed by Lijo Jose Pellissery follows two undercover police officers in search of a fugitive in a mysterious forest, encountering bizarre and otherworldly phenomena. The 2022 horror film Venus is inspired by H. P. Lovecraft's "The Dreams in the Witch House". It has been confirmed by Toonami that the series Housing Complex C was meant to invoke Lovecraftian themes.

Guillermo del Toro's Cabinet of Curiosities features two episodes adapted from Lovecraft's "Pickman's Model" and "Dreams in the Witch House".

== Games ==
Elements of Lovecraftian horror have appeared in numerous video games and role-playing games. These themes have been recognized as becoming more common, although difficulties in portraying Lovecraftian horror in a video games beyond a visual aesthetic are recognized.

=== Tabletop ===
Lovecraft was an influence on Dungeons & Dragons starting in the early 1970s, and initial printings of AD&D Deities & Demigods included characters from Lovecraft's novels. Dungeons & Dragons influenced later role-playing games, including Call of Cthulhu (1980) which influenced later board games such as the adventure board game Arkham Horror (1987) and Arkham Horror: The Card Game (2016), and recruited new fans for the Cthulhu mythos. Mythos was a trading card game released in 1996, based on the Cthulhu Mythos. Magic: The Gathering expansions such as Battle for Zendikar (2015), Eldritch Moon (2016), and Shadows over Innistrad (2016) contain Lovecraftian components. The tabletop co-op game Cthulhu: Death May Die is also based on Lovecraft's works as it is set in the world of the Cthulhu Mythos and has the players characters attempting to prevent the awakening of Cthulhu by its cultists.

=== Video games ===
==== 1980s and 1990s ====
Video games, like films, have a rich history of Lovecraftian elements and adaptations. In 1987, The Lurking Horror, a text-based adventure game released by Infocom, was the first to bring the Lovecraftian horror subgenre to computer platforms.

Alone in the Dark, a 1992 video game, contains Lovecraftian elements and references.

Shadow of the Comet, a 1993 game which takes place in the 19th century, is strongly inspired by the myth of Cthulhu.

Quake, a 1996 FPS game, has Lovecraftian elements.

The 1998 text adventure game Anchorhead is heavily inspired by Lovecraftian Horror and features many elements of the Cthulhu mythos, as well as quotes from Lovecraft.

==== 2000s ====
The 2003 horror visual novel Saya no Uta is inspired by Lovecraft and features Lovecraftian themes.

Call of Cthulhu: Dark Corners of the Earth for Windows and Xbox is a first person shooter with strong survival horror elements.

Eternal Darkness for the GameCube utilizes heavy themes of cosmic horror throughout the game, in particular with the player characters' sanity being affected through their interactions with the supernatural.

==== 2010s ====
The survival horror game Amnesia: The Dark Descent is heavily inspired by Lovecraftian horror, in visual design, plot and mechanics, with a recognized lasting impact on horror games as a genre. The Last Door is a point-and-click adventure game which combines Lovecraftian horror with Gothic horror, and the FromSoftware game Bloodborne includes many Lovecraftian and cosmic horror themes, without using the Cthulhu Mythos.

Other games released since 2010 with elements of Lovecraftian horror include Dragon's Crown, a D&D-inspired dark fantasy ARPG which contains deities, supernatural creatures and transformations, Sunless Sea, a gothic horror survival/exploration role-playing game, Vintage Story, a sandbox survival game with in-game enemies called "Drifters" inspired by the genre, the game Darkest Dungeon a role-playing video game with an emphasis on mental trauma and affliction, Edge of Nowhere, an action-adventure virtual reality game, Black Souls II, a psychological horror eroge role-playing game, and The Sinking City, an open world detective and survival horror game set in 1920s New England, drawing inspiration from The Shadow over Innsmouth and "Facts Concerning the Late Arthur Jermyn and His Family". Smite features Cthulhu as a playable character. The 2018 first-person shooter Dusk has many Lovecraftian influences, such as its third chapter, "The Nameless City", the final boss Nyarlathotep, and its inspiration from the Lovecraft themed first-person shooter Quake. The 2011 game Terraria's final boss is Moon Lord, which is heavily implied to be Cthulhu. There are also multiple bosses in Terraria which are parts of Cthulhu.

==== 2020s ====
In 2020, Call of the Sea, an adventure-puzzle game heavily inspired by the works of Lovecraft, was released.

Horror-adventure game No One Lives Under the Lighthouse draws significant inspiration from Lovecraft's work. Signalis, a 2022 horror game, is inspired by and features a quotation from Lovecraft's short story "The Festival".

The 2022 action RPG Elden Ring is about how an external order imposed its very presence onto life, bringing with it external concepts. A horror, which denied primordial life a natural order, corrupting it, dooming it to eternal ruin.

The 2022 visual novel Sucker for Love: First Date is a parodic dating sim and horror-themed visual novel developed by indie developer Joseph "Akabaka" Hunter, and published by DreadXP. The main character, Darling, seeks "smooches" from Lovecraftian entities, using the Necronomicon's rituals to summon them.

The Baby in Yellow is a 2023 Lovecraftian comedy horror game created by Scottish studio Team Terrible. Inspired by The King In Yellow, it tells a series of short stories revolving around a baby and his unfortunate babysitters.

Dredge is a 2023 indie fishing video game, which follows a fisherman who encounters increasingly Lovecraftian creatures as he ventures out further into an open world archipelago.

Alone in the Dark's 2024 reboot uses many Lovecraftian themes, universe and monsters such as Shub-Niggurath or Nyarlathotep.

Still Wakes the Deep is a 2024 psychological horror videogame, in which an oil rig is slowly taken over by an alien entity. It features gruesome body horror, arising from the entity rapidly infecting the rig, mutating members of the crew into monstrosities.

Look Outside is a 2025 turn-based survival horror video game mixed with RPG elements. In the game, the arrival of an eldritch cosmic entity known as the Visitor causes people who look at him (or perceive him in other ways) to transform into grotesque forms, often losing their sanity in the process. The main character Sam must survive 15 days of this apocalypse without going outside.

Cthulhu: The Cosmic Abyss is a 2026 adventure horror game, following the main character Noah in his investigation of occult findings with his AI companion Key. Notably, the game takes place in 2053, contrary to the common Lovecraftian time period of the 1920s and 1930s.

The Sinking City 2 is a 2026 Survival horror video game. It serves as a sequel to the 2019 game The Sinking City. However, it differs greatly from the first game as it has a new setting, new Player character and a focus on survival rather than investigation. It follows Calvin Rafferty as he explores a now mostly sunken Arkham and encounters eldritch creatures.

== Other media ==
- Quiet, Please, 1940s American fantasy-horror radio drama. One episode referred explicitly to Lovecraft by name ("The Man Who Stole a Planet") and several additional episodes dealt with Lovecraftian themes.
- Junji Ito's Uzumaki
- Mansions of Madness 1st and 2nd edition board game
- The Magnus Archives, podcast
- American musical group Metallica has been influenced by Lovecraft in several songs, initially due to bassist Cliff Burton's interest in the author: These songs include "The Call of Ktulu", "The Thing That Should Not Be", "All Nightmare Long", and "Dream No More".
- The Call of the Void, podcast
- SCP Foundation, fictional organization written collaboratively as online articles.
- Call of Cthulhu, role playing game by Chaosium, Inc
- Mark E. Smith (1957–2018), vocalist, lyricist and leader of English rock group The Fall cited Lovecraft as an influence on his worldview and songwriting. In 2007, Smith read "The Colour Out of Space" for the BBC.
- The Lovecraft Investigations, a BBC production starting in 2019 which adapts Lovecraft's stories to modern times as told in a true crime podcast.

== See also ==
- Cosmicism
- Cthulhu Mythos
  - Characters of the Cthulhu Mythos
  - Cthulhu Mythos deities
  - Elements of the Cthulhu Mythos
  - Cthulhu Mythos anthology
  - Cthulhu Mythos in popular culture
- Weird fiction
- Dark fantasy
- Utopian and dystopian fiction
- Science fantasy
- Cloverfield (franchise)

== Citations ==
- Black, Andy (1996). "Crawling Celluloid Chaos: H. P. Lovecraft in Cinema". In Black, Andy (ed.). Necronomicon: The Journal of Horror and Erotic Cinema, Book One. Creation Books. pp. 109–122.
- Bloch, Robert (August 1973). "Poe & Lovecraft". Ambrosia (2). Archived from the original on 2011-07-20.
- Burleson, Donald R. (1991). "On Lovecraft's Themes: Touching the Glass". In Schultz, David E.; Joshi, S.T. (eds.). An Epicure in the Terrible: A Centennial Anthology of Essays in Honor of H. P. Lovecraft. Fairleigh Dickinson University Press. pp. 135–147. ISBN 978-0-8386-3415-8.
- Fassbender, Tom. "Interviews: Mike Mignola". Dark Horse. Archived from the original on 2007-11-23.
- Harms, Daniel (2006). The Encyclopedia Cthulhiana: A Guide to Lovecraftian Horror. Chaosium. ISBN 1-56882-169-7.
- Jacobs, James (October 2004). "The Shadow Over D&D: H. P. Lovecraft's Influence on Dungeons & Dragons". Dragon (#324).
- Joshi, S.T. (2007). "The Cthulhu Mythos". In Joshi, S.T. (ed.). Icons of Horror and the Supernatural: An Encyclopedia of Our Worst Nightmares, Volumes 1 & 2. Greenwood Press. pp. 97–128. ISBN 978-0-313-33780-2.
- King, Stephen (2019). "Introduction 'Lovecraft's Pillow'". In Houellebecq, Michel (ed.). H. P. Lovecraft: Against the World, Against Life. Cernunnos. ISBN 978-1-932416-18-3.
- Lovecraft, H.P. (1992). Crawling Chaos: Selected works 1920-1935 H. P. Lovecraft. introduction by Colin Wilson. Creation Press. ISBN 1-871592-72-0.
- Migliore, Andrew; Strysik, John (February 1, 2006). Lurker in the Lobby: A Guide to the Cinema of H. P. Lovecraft. Night Shade Books. ISBN 978-1892389350.
- Mitchell, Charles P. (2001). The Complete H. P. Lovecraft Filmography. Greenwood Press.
- Schweitzer, Darrell (1975). Lovecraft in the Cinema. TK Graphics.
- Smith, Don G. (2006). H. P. Lovecraft in Popular Culture: The Works and Their Adaptations in Film, Television, Comics, Music, and Games. McFarland. p. 173. ISBN 0-7864-2091-X.
- Stableford, Brian (2007). "The Cosmic Horror". In Joshi, S.T. (ed.). Icons of Horror and the Supernatural: An Encyclopedia of Our Worst Nightmares, Volumes 1 & 2. Greenwood Press. pp. 65–96. ISBN 978-0-313-33780-2.
- Zenke, Michael. "Dreading the Shadows on the Wall". The Escapist. Archived from the original on 2006-11-25.
