= The Shadow over Innsmouth =

1936 horror novella by H. P. Lovecraft

- Dust jacket from the first edition
- Author: H. P. Lovecraft
- Illustrator: Frank Utpatel
- Cover artist: Frank Utpatel
- Language: English
- Genre: Horror
- Publisher: Visionary Publishing Company
- Publication date: April 1936
- Publication place: United States
- OCLC: 3920225
- Text: The Shadow over Innsmouth at Wikisource

The Shadow over Innsmouth is a horror novella by American author H. P. Lovecraft, written in November–December 1931. It forms part of the Cthulhu Mythos, using its motif of a malign undersea civilization, and references several shared elements of the Mythos, including place-names, mythical creatures, and invocations. The Shadow over Innsmouth is the only Lovecraft story that was published in book form during his lifetime.

The story follows the narrator, a student conducting an antiquarian tour of New England, as he travels through the nearby decrepit seaport of Innsmouth. Here he interacts with strange people, witnesses disturbing events, and uncovers a conspiracy that leads to horrifying and personal revelations that challenge his own sanity.

== Plot ==
The narrator explains how he instigated a secret investigation of the decrepit town of Innsmouth, Massachusetts, a former seaport isolated from other nearby towns by vast salt marshes, by the U.S. government after fleeing it on July 16, 1927. The investigation ultimately concluded with the arrest and detention of many of the town's residents in concentration camps as well as a submarine torpedoing nearby Devil Reef, which the press falsely reported as Prohibition liquor raids. The narrator proceeds to describe in detail the events surrounding his initial interest in the town, which lies along the route of his tour from Ohio across New England, taken when he was a 21-year-old student at Oberlin College.

While waiting for the bus that will take him to Innsmouth, the narrator busies himself in neighboring Newburyport by gathering information on the town's history from the superstitious locals. He learns that Innsmouth was once a profitable port and shipbuilding center that declined after the War of 1812 interrupted shipping. A merchant, Obed Marsh, built a profitable gold refinery, but the town only deteriorated further after riots and after a mysterious epidemic eliminated half of its residents in 1845. Marsh also founded a pagan cult called the Esoteric Order of Dagon, which became the town's primary religion. The townsfolk treat outsiders and government officials with hostility.

The narrator tells the surprised bus driver that he wishes to stop at Innsmouth. He finds Innsmouth to be a mostly deserted fishing town populated by people who walk with a distinctive shambling gait and who have "queer narrow heads with flat noses and bulgy, stary eyes." The town and its residents are saturated with a fishy odor and the narrator feels a persistent uneasiness at various junctures of his exploration. He gathers information from an apparently normal grocery store clerk from neighboring Arkham, including a map of the town and the name of Zadok Allen, an elderly local drunkard who might give him information when plied with alcohol.

After exploring the town to find unusual architecture and fisherman who exhibit advanced symptoms of the Innsmouth degradation, the narrator lures Zadok to the seafront with a bottle of whiskey. Zadok explains what he knows of the town's history. While trading in the Caroline Islands, Obed Marsh discovered a Kanak tribe in Pohnpei who offered human sacrifices to a race of immortal fish-like humanoids known as the Deep Ones. The Kanak also bred with Deep Ones, producing hybrid offspring which have the appearance of normal humans in childhood but eventually slowly transform into Deep Ones themselves and leave the surface to live in ancient undersea cities for eternity. When hard times fell on Innsmouth, Marsh's cult performed similar sacrifices to the Deep Ones in exchange for wealth in the form of large fish hauls and unique jewelry. When Marsh and his followers were eventually arrested, the Deep Ones retaliated by attacking the town and killing more than half of its population.

The survivors were left with no other choice than to join the cult and continue Marsh's practices. Male and female inhabitants were forced to breed with the Deep Ones, producing hybrids who upon maturing permanently migrate underwater to live in the city of Y'ha-nthlei, located underneath Devil Reef. The town is dominated by Marsh's grandson Barnabas, who is almost fully transformed into a Deep One. Zadok explains that these ocean-dwellers have designs on the surface world and have been planning the use of shoggoths, semi-intelligent protoplasmic entities, to conquer or transform it. Zadok sees strange waves approaching the dock and tells the narrator that they have been seen, urging him to leave town immediately. The narrator is unnerved, but ultimately dismisses the story.

After being told that the bus is experiencing engine trouble, the narrator has no choice but to spend the night in a musty hotel. While attempting to sleep, he hears noises at his door as if someone is trying to enter. With no means of self-defense, he escapes out a window and through the streets while a town-wide hunt for him occurs, forcing him to imitate the peculiar walk of the Innsmouth locals as he walks past search parties in the darkness. Eventually, the narrator makes his way towards railroad tracks and hears a procession of Deep Ones passing in the road before him. Against his judgment, he opens his eyes to see the creatures. He finds that they have grey-green skin, fish-like heads with unblinking eyes, gills on their necks and webbed hands, and communicate in unintelligible croak-like voices. Horrified, the narrator faints but wakes up at noon the next day alone and unharmed.

After reaching Arkham and alerting government authorities about Innsmouth, the narrator discovers that his grandmother was related to Obed Marsh's family, although the origins of her mother were unclear. The narrator's uncle had previously visited Arkham to research his ancestry before killing himself by gunshot. After returning home to Toledo, the narrator researches his family tree to discover that he is a descendant of Marsh through his second wife Pth'thya-l'yi. By 1930, he begins gradually transforming into a Deep One. He begins to use odd words and phrases, his previous convictions lessen, and he begins having dreams of his grandmother and Pth'thya-l'yi in Y'ha-nthlei, which was damaged but not destroyed by the submarine attack. They explain that the Deep Ones will remain underwater for the time being, but will eventually return to invade the surface world "for the tribute Great Cthulhu craved."

After briefly glimpsing a shoggoth in one of his dreams, the narrator awakens to find that he has fully acquired the "Innsmouth look." He wants to kill himself and purchases an automatic, but cannot go through with it. As the narrator concludes his story, he determines to free his cousin Lawrence, who is even further transformed than he, from a sanatorium in Canton and take him to live in Y'ha-nthlei.

== Characters ==
Robert Olmstead
Olmstead is the narrator and protagonist of the story. He discovers Innsmouth on a tour of New England while seeking genealogical information, and finds more than he bargained for.
The character, who remains unnamed in The Shadow over Innsmouth, is called "Robert Olmstead" in Lovecraft's notes for the story, published in Arkham House's Something About Cats and Other Pieces (1949). An H. P. Lovecraft Encyclopedia points out that Olmstead's travel habits parallel Lovecraft's own—Lovecraft too would "seek the cheapest route", and Olmstead's dinner of "vegetable soup with crackers" is typical of Lovecraft's low-budget diet.
Obed Marsh
Wealthy sea captain, patriarch of the elite Marsh family, and the founder of the Esoteric Order of Dagon. He was referred to by Zadok Allen as being the man who first summoned the Deep Ones to Innsmouth. In 1846, he was jailed after the towns bordering Innsmouth became suspicious of his crew. He died in 1878.
According to Lovecraft's story notes, Marsh's daughter, Alice, is Robert Olmstead's great-grandmother.
Barnabas Marsh
Known as Old Man Marsh, he is the grandson of Obed Marsh and the owner of the Marsh refinery at the time of The Shadow over Innsmouth. Barnabas' father was Onesiphorus Marsh, Obed's son by his fully human wife, though Barnabas' mother, who was never seen in public, was apparently an actual Deep One. Zadok Allen says of him: "Right naow Barnabas is about changed. Can't shet his eyes no more, an' is all aout o' shape. They say he still wears clothes, but he'll take to the water soon."
Zadok Allen
Born in 1831, one of the few completely human residents of Innsmouth, and an alcoholic. His drunken ramblings allow Lovecraft to convey much of the town's secret backstory to the story's protagonist.
An H. P. Lovecraft Encyclopedia notes that Allen resembles—and shares his years of birth and death with—Jonathan E. Hoag, an amateur poet of Lovecraft's acquaintance. A possible literary inspiration is the character of Dr. Humphrey Lathrop in Herbert Gorman's The Place Called Dagon (1927), who, like Allen, is a drinker who knows the secret history of his town.
Grocery store clerk
An unnamed youth of about seventeen who is a native resident of Arkham, and therefore completely human. His superiors transferred him to Innsmouth, and both he and his family loathe the idea of him working there, but he cannot afford to quit his job. He is only too happy to encounter the narrator, and describes the sinister goings-on within Innsmouth, but the boy is unaware of what is really happening in the town. He tells the narrator of the bizarre deformities afflicting the native townspeople, and how the older generation are almost never seen outdoors due to their monstrous appearance. He also briefly informs the narrator of the Esoteric Order of Dagon, and what he knows of the town's society. The boy directs him to the drunkard, Zadok Allen, for more information. Crucially, he draws an extensive map of the town for Olmstead, which Olmstead uses later on as a means of escaping Innsmouth.

=== Robert Olmstead's family tree ===
This is a family tree of the story's protagonist and narrator, Robert Olmstead, as described in The Shadow over Innsmouth and in Lovecraft's notes.

Color key:	Deep Ones	Humans	Hybrid offspring

Pth'thya-l'yi	Obed Marsh	1st wife
2 children	Benjamin Orne	Alice Marsh	Onesiphorus Marsh	wife	3 daughters
James Williamson	Eliza Orne	Barnabas Marsh	wife
Douglas Williamson	Robert Olmstead's father	Robert Olmstead's mother	Walter Williamson	wife
Robert Olmstead	Lawrence Williamson

== Inspiration ==
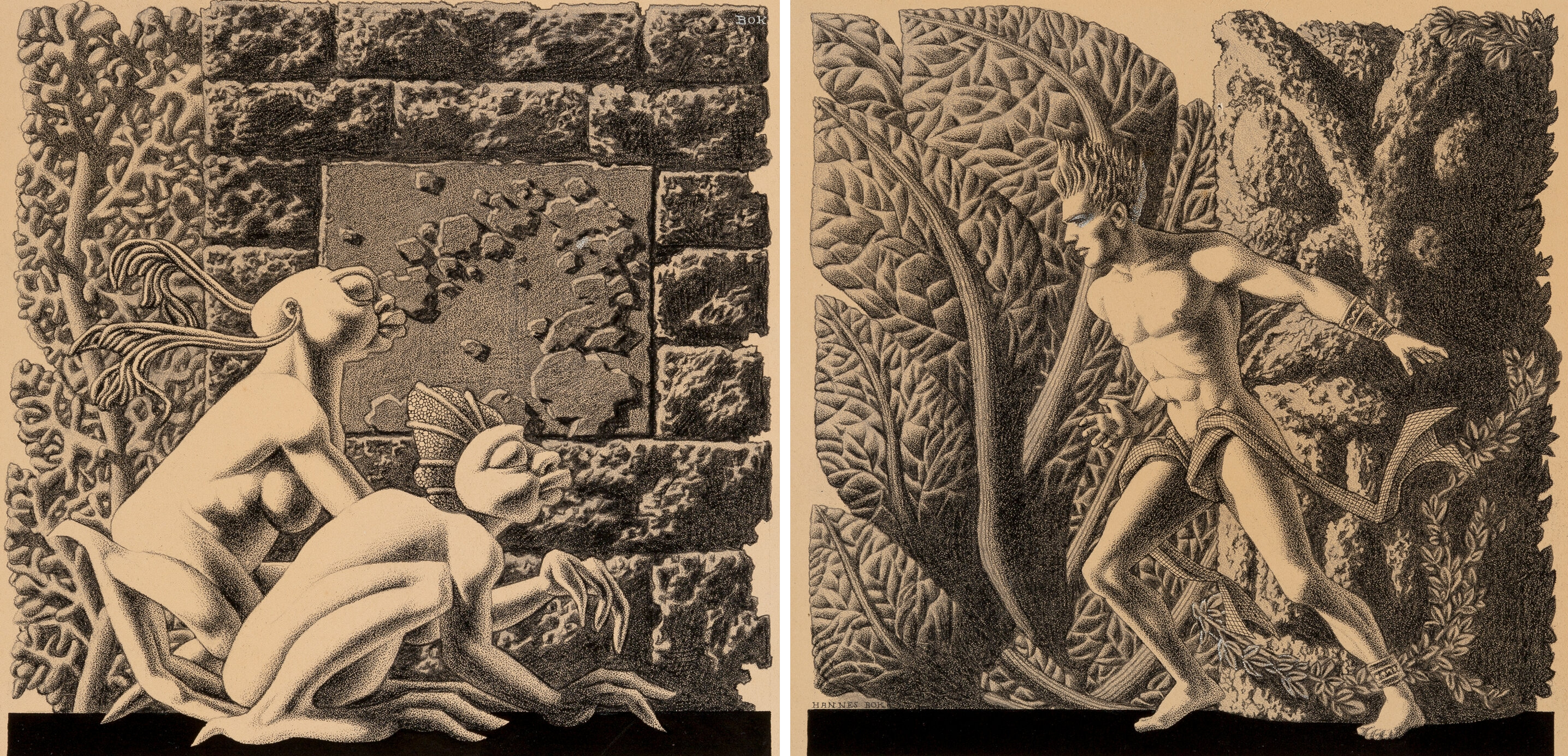
Hannes Bok's illustrations for the publication of the story in the January 1942 issue of Weird Tales

Both of Lovecraft's parents died in a mental hospital, and some critics believe that a concern with having inherited a propensity for physical and mental degeneration is reflected in the plot of The Shadow over Innsmouth. It also shares some themes with his earlier story, "Facts Concerning the Late Arthur Jermyn and His Family". Cthulhu, an entity from previous Lovecraft stories, is the overlord of the sea creatures. The mind of the narrator deteriorates when he is afforded a glimpse of what exists outside his perceived reality. This is a central tenet of Cosmicism, which Lovecraft emphasizes in the opening sentence of "The Call of Cthulhu": "The most merciful thing in the world, I think, is the inability of the human mind to correlate all its contents."

Lovecraft based the town of Innsmouth on his impressions of Newburyport, Massachusetts, which he had visited in 1923 and fall 1931. The real Newburyport features as a neighboring town in the narrative. A likely influence on the plot is Lovecraft's horror of miscegenation, which is documented by Lovecraft biographer L. Sprague de Camp and others.

Robert M. Price cites two works as literary sources for The Shadow over Innsmouth: Robert W. Chambers' "The Harbor-Master" and Irvin S. Cobb's "Fishhead". Chambers' story concerns the discovery of "the remnants of the last race of amphibious human beings", living in a five-mile deep chasm just off the Atlantic coast. The creature of the title is described as "a man with round, fixed, fishy eyes, and soft, slaty skin. But the horror of the thing were the two gills that swelled and relaxed spasmodically." Lovecraft was evidently impressed by this tale, writing in a letter to Frank Belknap Long: "God! The Harbour-Master!!!" "Fishhead" is the story of a "human monstrosity" with an uncanny resemblance to a fish: his skull sloped back so abruptly that he could hardly be said to have a forehead at all; his chin slanted off right into nothing. His eyes were small and round with shallow, glazed, pink-yellow pupils, and they were set wide apart on his head, and they were unwinking and staring, like a fish's eyes. Lovecraft, in "Supernatural Horror in Literature", called Cobb's story "banefully effective in its portrayal of unnatural affinities between a hybrid idiot and the strange fish of an isolated lake". Price notes that Fishhead, as the "son of a Negro father and a half-breed Indian mother", "embodies unambiguously the basic premise of The Shadow over Innsmouth.... This, of course, is really what Lovecraft found revolting in the idea of interracial marriage...the subtextual hook of different ethnic races mating and 'polluting' the gene pool." Price points out the resemblance in names between the Deep One city of Y'ha-nthlei and Yoharneth-Lahai, a fictional deity in Lord Dunsany's The Gods of Pegana, who "sendeth little dreams out of Pegana to please the people of Earth"—a precursor to Lovecraft's fictional deity Cthulhu, who sends less pleasant dreams from R'lyeh.

The description of the Deep Ones has similarities to the sea creature described in H. G. Wells' short story "In the Abyss" (1896):

Two large and protruding eyes projected from sockets in chameleon fashion, and it had a broad reptilian mouth with horny lips beneath its little nostrils. In the position of the ears were two huge gill-covers, and out of these floated a branching tree of coralline filaments, almost like the tree-like gills that very young rays and sharks possess. But the humanity of the face was not the most extraordinary thing about the creature. It was a biped; its almost globular body was poised on a tripod of two frog-like legs and a long, thick tail, and its fore limbs, which grotesquely caricatured the human hand, much as a frog's do, carried a long shaft of bone, tipped with copper. The colour of the creature was variegated; its head, hands, and legs were purple; but its skin, which hung loosely upon it, even as clothes might do, was a phosphorescent grey.

== Cthulhu Mythos ==
- Cthulhu and R'lyeh are mentioned, the former in passing by Zadok Allen, and both toward the end of the narrative.
- The creature known as Dagon is first introduced in Lovecraft's 1917 tale of the same name.
- As related in "The Thing on the Doorstep" (1937), Asenath Waite, the possessed victim of her father Ephraim Waite, is by implication one of the human/Deep One hybrids, and was a resident of Innsmouth before attending Miskatonic University. The servants she brings into her marriage to Edward Derby are likewise Innsmouth natives. This occurs after The Shadow over Innsmouth as Asenath's father and she escaped the government raid mentioned in the original story.
- The Waites, Gilmans, Eliots and Marshes are the "gently bred" families of Innsmouth. Despite his name, the protagonist of "The Dreams in the Witch House", Walter Gilman, is not established as having any links to Innsmouth or the Deep Ones.
- August Derleth also used the Deep Ones in the short story "Innsmouth Clay", which was inspired by an entry in Lovecraft's Commonplace Book. "The Shuttered Room" is another short story by Derleth, inspired by a note by Lovecraft, which also involves the Deep Ones. It mentions a connection between the Marsh family of Innsmouth and the Whateley family of Dunwich from "The Dunwich Horror".

== Publication ==
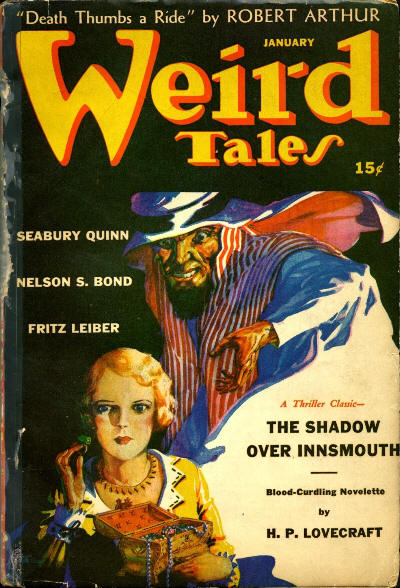
Although rejected by the magazine during Lovecraft's lifetime, The Shadow over Innsmouth was reprinted in Weird Tales in 1942.

Lovecraft was quite critical of The Shadow over Innsmouth, writing to August Derleth that the story "has all the defects I deplore—especially in point of style, where hackneyed phrases & rhythms have crept in despite all precautions.... No—I don't intend to offer 'The Shadow over Innsmouth' for publication, for it would stand no chance of acceptance."

The story was rejected by Weird Tales editor Farnsworth Wright when Derleth surreptitiously submitted it for publication in 1933. "I have read Lovecraft's story ... and must confess that it fascinates me", he wrote to Derleth. "But I don't know just what I can do with it. It is hard to break a story of this kind into two parts, and it is too long to run complete in one part."

In late 1935, William L. Crawford's Visionary Publishing Company began the process of issuing The Shadow over Innsmouth as a book. The project came to fruition in November 1936 (although the copyright page declares the date of publication as April 1936), but the book had so many typographical errors that Lovecraft insisted on an errata sheet (which was also faulty). Lovecraft was displeased with the production; writing to his correspondent Lee McBride White on November 30, 1936, he wrote: "My Shadow over Innsmouth is now out - but as a first cloth-bound book it doesn't awake any enthusiasm in me. Indeed, it is one of the lousiest jobs I've ever seen - 30 misprints, slovenly format, & loose, slipshod binding. The solitary redeeming feature is the set of Utpatel illustrations - one of which, on the dust wrapper, saves the appearance of the thing..."

It had a bound run of 200 copies — the only book of Lovecraft's fiction distributed during his lifetime. Crawford had printed 400 copies but bound only 200; the others were destroyed later. Of this edition Robert Weinberg has written: "Only a few hundred copies of the book were printed, and even less than that were sold, even though it was available at the bargain price of $1 per copy. It featured good paper, black linen binding and four illustrations by Frank Utpatel. The book was the only bound hardcover to appear during Lovecraft's lifetime and became one of the true rarities in the collecting field. Its failure, and the poor sales of third non-fantasy book convinced William Crawford of the futility of his efforts."

After Lovecraft's death (and Wright's), the story appeared in an unauthorized abridged version in the January 1942 issue of Weird Tales.

== Reception ==
As L. Sprague de Camp noted, the action sections of Innsmouth are a departure for Lovecraft; the story's tense and memorable siege scene within the titular town's hotel reveals a flair in execution on a par with some of the most compelling chapters of R. L. Stevenson's Kidnapped. August Derleth called The Shadow over Innsmouth "a dark, brooding story, typical of Lovecraft at his best." Robert Weinberg praised it as "a well-written story". According to de Camp, Lovecraft distrusted his ability to narrate action, and the story is unusual in that Lovecraft includes sustained and effective action writing during the culmination of the events in Innsmouth.

== Adaptations ==
=== Film and television ===
- The movie City Under the Sea (1965) is loosely based on The Shadow over Innsmouth.
- Colombian writer Andres Caicedo adapted The Shadow over Innsmouth into a screenplay in 1973. He traveled to Hollywood in 1975 to sell it to Roger Corman, alongside his adaptation of Clark Ashton Smith's The Nameless Offspring, but failed in his purpose. Neither of the screenplays was shot and remain as part of the Andres Caicedo Collection in the Luis Angel Arango Library in Bogotá.
- Chiaki J. Konaka adapted it into Japanese as The Shadow Covering Innsmouth (Japanese: インスマスを覆う影, Hepburn: Insumasu o Ouu Kage).
- The Shadow over Innsmouth forms the principal storyline in Stuart Gordon's 2001 film Dagon. Full Moon Entertainment was going to release Gordon's original adaptation (under the original novella's title) in 1991, using Bernie Wrightson's character designs, but the project was unrealized. Dagon uses some of Wrightson's designs from that project.
- The 2007 film Cthulhu is loosely based on The Shadow over Innsmouth.
- The 2014 music video for "Escape from Midwich Valley" by Carpenter Brut and the 2015 short film Innsmouth are also based on The Shadow over Innsmouth.
- A 2005 episode of The Mighty Boosh, "The Legend of Old Gregg", appears to draw inspiration from the story, including a town with strange residents surrounded by mystery, an elderly fisherman who tells the main characters the history of the town and Old Gregg himself, who is a human-fish hybrid.
- In 2015, the production and eventual publication of a film titled The Shadow over Innsmouth was announced on the website The Lovecraft Ezine. The film project, cited to be a very faithful adaptation of the novella, was directed by Bryan Moore, who worked on a previous cinematic conversion of the Lovecraft short story "Cool Air". A trailer was published, but the film itself has remained in development hell.
- In 2020, a visual effects studio (Providence VFX) has for the first time reproduced the city of Innsmouth in computer graphics.
- The 2020 film The Deep Ones, set in modern Southern California.
- The opening part of The Simpsons "Treehouse of Horror XXIX" takes place in 'Fogburyport' where the Deep One-esque locals trick the family into attending an eating contest that is a ruse to sacrifice them to Cthulhu.
- The Ultraman Decker episode "Lord Ragon" connects recurring Ultra kaiju Ragon to the Deep Ones and specifically brings up an historical incident at Innsmouth involving the creatures.

=== Tabletop role-playing games ===
- Innsmouth plays a key role in the backstory of the horror role-playing game Delta Green. The raid that takes place in the end of the novella leads to the U.S. government becoming aware of the Deep Ones, and prompts the creation of the Delta Green, a covert organization dedicated to investigating and combating supernatural threats from the Cthulhu Mythos.

=== Video games ===
- Shadow of the Comet, a 1993 adventure game, takes place in a cult-controlled town of Illsmouth, an alteration on Lovecraft's Innsmouth.
- Innsmouth no Yakata (インスマウスの館, lit. "The Mansion of Innsmouth") is a 1995 3D first-person shooter video game for the Virtual Boy, released in Japan based on Chiaki J. Konaka's 1992 television series Insmus o Oou Kage. It featured a branching level structure and four possible endings.
- The 2005 video game Call of Cthulhu: Dark Corners of the Earth uses many elements from "The Shadow over Innsmouth" with a great degree of accuracy. It has the town of Innsmouth as the backdrop followed by the opening plot that leads to the second, third, and fourth chapters of the novella. Although the protagonist differs greatly with a different name and background, the majority of the characters from the novella are included in the game like Zadok Allen, the Marsh family, and the grocery store clerk, who is given the name Brian Burnham. Dark Corners of the Earth was supposed to be followed by a sequel set in the 2000s, titled Call of Cthulhu: Destiny's End, but due to the closure of its developer Headfirst Productions, the game was cancelled.
- Indie game Chronicle of Innsmouth (production started in 2015) is directly based on the plot of The Shadow over Innsmouth.
- In the fictional universe of the 2013 fighting game Skullgirls, there is a neighborhood known as "Little Innsmouth", which is inhabited by fish-like humanoids, and which also serves as the stage for Ms. Fortune, one of the game's characters.
- In the DLC of Bloodborne, The Old Hunters, a hamlet inhabited by gruesome fishermen allegedly draws its inspiration from the accursed fishing village in The Shadow over Innsmouth. The game also features several deities which are referred to as "Great Ones".
- The Elder Scrolls IV: Oblivion has a quest named "A Shadow Over Hackdirt", where the player goes to a mysterious small town and finds out the townspeople are part of a cult who worship beings known as "The Deep Ones".
- The online video game The Secret World features a town called Kingsmouth in which many supernatural events occur. Additionally, the Innsmouth Academy is a part of the Solomon Island zone in which Kingsmouth may be found. The Secret World borrows heavily from the Lovecraftian mythos as well as many other continuities.
- The narrator of Darkest Dungeon states that he met one of the game's bosses, the Siren, after striking a bargain with eldritch fishmen in which he provided sacrifices of humans and artifacts in exchange for gold. The Cove, one of the game's main areas, features these fishmen as the primary enemy.
- Call of Cthulhu is a 2018 video game, set in a fishing village called Darkwater that closely resembles dilapidated Innsmouth; its residents are secretive cultists influenced by characters from the story.
- The Sinking City, a 2019 horror game, takes inspiration from the novella with the inclusion of Innsmouth, the Esoteric Order of Dagon, and residents with fish-like physical appearance called the "Innsmouthers."
- The game Call of the Sea, a 2020 adventure game, takes inspiration from the short story.
- The game Shadows Over Loathing derives its name from the short story and features several references to it and other short stories by H.P. Lovecraft, such as The Music of Erich Zann and The Colour Out of Space.
- The second chapter of the 2026 video game Escape from Ever After takes place in a parody of the book, called "The Shadow Over Innsbeak".

=== Comics ===
- Alberto Breccia adapted the story in 1973.
- Several plot elements from The Shadow over Innsmouth appear in two comics of the Teenage Mutant Ninja Turtles franchise, namely in the Mirage comic "Men of Shadow" (TMNT Vol.1 #29) and the Archie comic "In the Dark" (TMNT Adventures #27).
- Ron Marz adapted the story for a one-shot comic book The Shadow Over Innsmouth, published by Dynamite Entertainment in July 2014, a crossover retelling with the pulp character The Shadow, therefore establishing a double meaning in the title by having the characters of Lamont Cranston and Margo Lane finding themselves trapped within the town.
- Gou Tanabe adapted the story into a manga in 2020.
- Steven Philip Jones and Trey Baldwin adapted The Shadow over Innsmouth into a graphic novel published by Caliber Comics in 2020.
- Several plot elements from The Shadow over Innsmouth are adapted to the 2021 fourth season of the webcomic series Witch Creek Road, in particular across the ten-part storyline Innsmouth (collected in the omnibus edition as Infested).

=== Card and board games ===
- Magic the Gathering's "Innistrad" block and its follow up, the "Shadows over Innistrad" block, contain minor references to The Shadow over Innsmouth. "Shadows over Innistrad" tells the story of the planeswalker Jace Beleren investigating the source of madness affecting the residents of Innistrad and their angelic protectors. The source is revealed to be Emrakul, one of a race of ancient beings called Eldrazi, who draw heavy influence from Lovecraft. In addition to inducing madness, Emrakul's influence warps the physiology of living beings in her vicinity, giving them a distinctive "look" of latticed flesh, additional appendages, and other strange mutations.
- The board game Mansions of Madness Second Edition utilizes the story of The Shadow over Innsmouth as one of the scenarios players can choose to play. Players begin the scenario in a hotel room in a rundown seaport town and take turns trying to uncover the mystery of what happened in Innsmouth before they find themselves stranded in a town flooded with supernatural problems. The companion app for the board game includes quotes from Lovecraft's original work and there are several miniature figures referred to as Deep Ones. Additionally, an expansion for the board game Arkham Horror features the town of Innsmouth and includes references to Lovecraft's piece. The game is titled, Arkham Horror: The Innsmouth Horror Expansion.
- Arkham Horror The Card Game: The Innsmouth Conspiracy

=== Other ===
- The H. P. Lovecraft Historical Society produced Dark Adventure Radio Theatre: The Shadow over Innsmouth, a Dark Adventure Radio Theatre adaptation of the story. In January 2012, the Cape Cod based Provincetown Theater announced a reading of a full-length play of the story, entitled HP Lovecraft's The Shadow over Innsmouth, adapted for the stage by Bragan Thomas.
- A reading of the story performed by Richard Coyle was produced and first broadcast by BBC Radio 4 Extra in 2011.
- The short story "Shoggoth's Old Peculiar" (Smoke and Mirrors, 1998) by Neil Gaiman contains many similarities to "The Shadow over Innsmouth": a student visits the coastal town of Innsmouth (in England rather than New England), he gets to talking to two drunks (pastiches of Peter Cook and Dudley Moore), he sees horrors in the water, and he passes out.
- The short story "The Shadow Over Doinksmouth" written by Will Menaker and distributed as a bonus for pre-orders of The Chapo Guide to Revolution is a satirical modernization of The Shadow Over Innsmouth.
- Author Serena Valentino used Lovecraft's tale as the inspiration for the beginning of her novel focusing on the Sea Witch Ursula, Poor Unfortunate Soul. In the beginning of the story, Ursula stalks through a town and transforms the citizens into half fish, half human horrors for their mistreatment of her and her father.
- WildClaw Theatre of Chicago presented a world premiere stage production of The Shadow Over Innsmouth in 2013, adapted to the stage by Scott Barsotti and directed by Scott Cummins.
- BBC Radio 4 released the third installment of The Lovecraft Investigations, a radio play in the style of a mystery podcast-like serial, based on and titled "The Shadow Over Innsmouth". Technically a sequel to the original story, the setting is changed to 2020 during the COVID-19 pandemic, with Obed Marsh established as an alias of the Count of St. Germain, Innsmouth's settlement being by those fleeing the Witchfinder Matthew Hopkins during the English Civil War, the Deep Ones also being responsible for the disappearances of the Roanoke Colony and the urban legend of Hoer Verde in Brazil, and the Somerton Man as a Deep One.

== Shadows over Innsmouth ==
The Shadow over Innsmouth was republished in a 1994 anthology entitled Shadows over Innsmouth, containing stories by other authors based on Innsmouth and the Old Ones. The collection was edited by Stephen Jones, and included contributions by Neil Gaiman, Ramsey Campbell, David Sutton, Kim Newman (both as himself and Jack Yeovil), and other authors. There are also two follow-up volumes, also edited by Jones.

== Sources ==
- Chalker, Jack L.; Mark Owings (1998). The Science-Fantasy Publishers: A Bibliographic History, 1923-1998. Westminster, MD and Baltimore: Mirage Press, Ltd. p. 705.
- Derleth, August (1996) [1937]. "H. P. Lovecraft—Outsider". Crypt of Cthulhu. 15 (3). Robert M. Price (ed.), West Warwick, RI: Necronomicon Press. Original publication: "H. P. Lovecraft—Outsider". River. 1 (3). June 1937.
- Lovecraft, Howard P. [1936] (1984). "The Shadow over Innsmouth". In S. T. Joshi (ed.). The Dunwich Horror and Others (9th corrected printing ed.). Sauk City, WI: Arkham House. ISBN 0-87054-037-8. Definitive version.
