= Cthulhu (2000 film) =

- Directed by: Damian Heffernan
- Written by: Damian Heffernan
- Produced by: Kevin Dunn, Damian Heffernan
- Starring: Paul Douglas; Melissa Georgiou; Malcolm Miller
- Cinematography: Carl Looper
- Edited by: Damian Heffernan
- Music by: Jason Sims
- Release date: 2000
- Running time: 75 minutes
- Country: Australia
- Language: English

Cthulhu is a 2000 Australian low budget horror film that was directed, produced, and written by Damian Heffernan. It is mostly based on two Lovecraft stories, "The Thing on the Doorstep" and The Shadow Over Innsmouth. It stars Adam Somes as a young student that discovers that his best friend has become involved in a cult intent on raising Cthulhu. It screened at the Melbourne Underground Film Festival, after which point it was purchased by Channel 9 for screening in Australia as part of their Australian content quota obligations. The film was also purchased by Trend Films in Italy for screening via their Satellite Television network.

== Synopsis ==
Dan (Adam Somes) was an average student at Miskatonic University until he shot his friend Edward (James Payne), who was a patient at Arkham Asylum. Dan had been tried and sentenced to life at Arkham Penitentiary, but was later found dead in his cell, with only a manuscript to explain his deeds.

In it he details that Edward had begun seeing a new girlfriend, Asenath (Melissa Georgiou), who he claimed could take over his body while he slept, part of powers that she gained from taking part in a cult. Things grow worse when Edward is implicated in a series of murders and imprisoned. Dan is brought in to the investigation by Inspector LeGrasse (Paul Douglas) and the two discover that Edward was involved with a cult that worshiped Cthulhu and were intent on using the being's power to their own ends. They enlist the help of one of the university professors, Armitage (Marcel Miller), to try to stop this from happening, only for this to result in the deaths of both Armitage and LeGrasse. Dan is then horrified to discover that his friend is possessed by Yog Sothoth, which led him to murder Edward.

== Cast ==
- Paul Douglas - Inspector LeGrasse
- Melissa Georgiou - Asenath Waite
- Malcolm Miller - Professor Armitage
- James Payne - Edward Derby
- Adam Somes - Dan Upton

== Production ==
The film was primarily shot in Canberra over a two-week period during the winter of 1996 and additional scenes were shot during early 1997. Post-production on the film was completed in 1998. A large number of the interior locations were shot in the (now demolished) Royal Canberra Hospital which was de-commissioned in 1991 and remained vacant for many years before the building was imploded in July 1997. Cthulhu was produced on a very low budget and was shot on 16mm film and was later transferred to digital Betacam for finishing. A rough cut, dual head print was screened for Miramax in the Australian Film, Television and Radio School's theatre in the hopes of obtaining finishing funds but was not ultimately purchased. The Producers abandoned hope of a theatrical release and raised additional funds to finish on video for a DVD release.

== Critical reaction ==
In their book Lurker in the Lobby: A Guide to the Cinema of H. P. Lovecraft, Andrew Migliore and John Strysik write: "Even though the seams show, the plot creaks, and the acting clips in and out of reality, the makers of Cthulhu really do mean it, and sometimes meaning it is enough. In the end it's an earnest effort at weaving together different Lovecraftian motifs into a cohesive movie."
