= The Call of the Void =

The Call of the Void may refer to:

- The Call of the Void (podcast), an audio drama podcast by Josie Eli Herman and Michael Alan Herman
- The Call of the Void (album), a 2023 album by Nita Strauss
- Call of the void, a sudden urge to jump when in a great high place
