= Facts Concerning the Late Arthur Jermyn and His Family =

1920 short story by H. P. Lovecraft

- Short story by H. P. Lovecraft
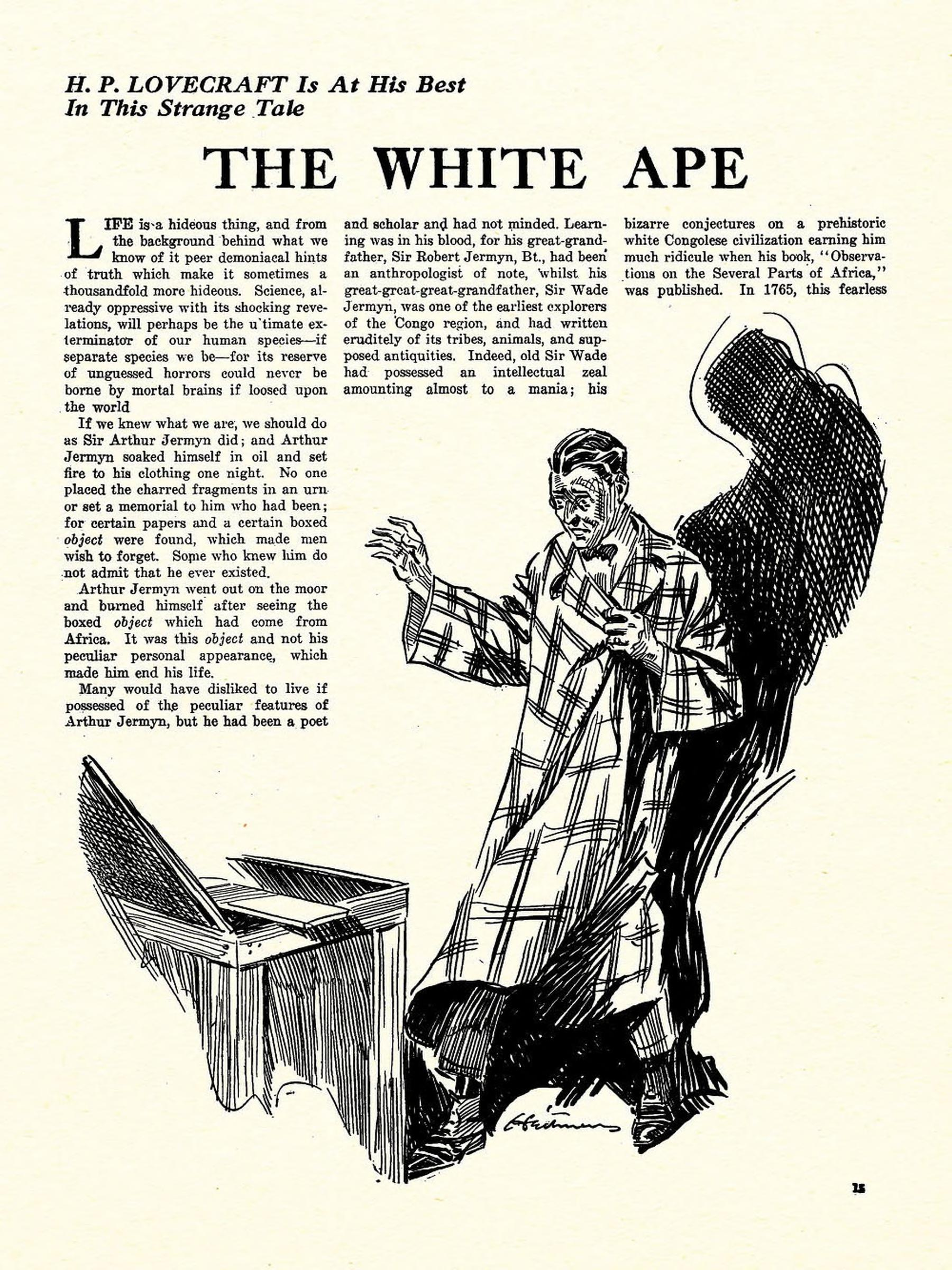
- Title page of "Facts Concerning the Late Arthur Jermyn and His Family" as it appeared in Weird Tales, April 1924. Against Lovecraft's wishes it was retitled "The White Ape." Illustration by William Heitman.

Text available at Wikisource
- Country: United States
- Language: English
- Genre: Horror

Publication
- Published in: The Wolverine
- Publication date: 1921

"Facts Concerning the Late Arthur Jermyn and His Family" (also known as "The White Ape" and simply "Arthur Jermyn") is a short story in the horror fiction genre, written by American author H. P. Lovecraft in 1920. The themes of the story are tainted ancestry, knowledge best left unknown, and a reality that human understanding finds intolerable.

== Plot ==
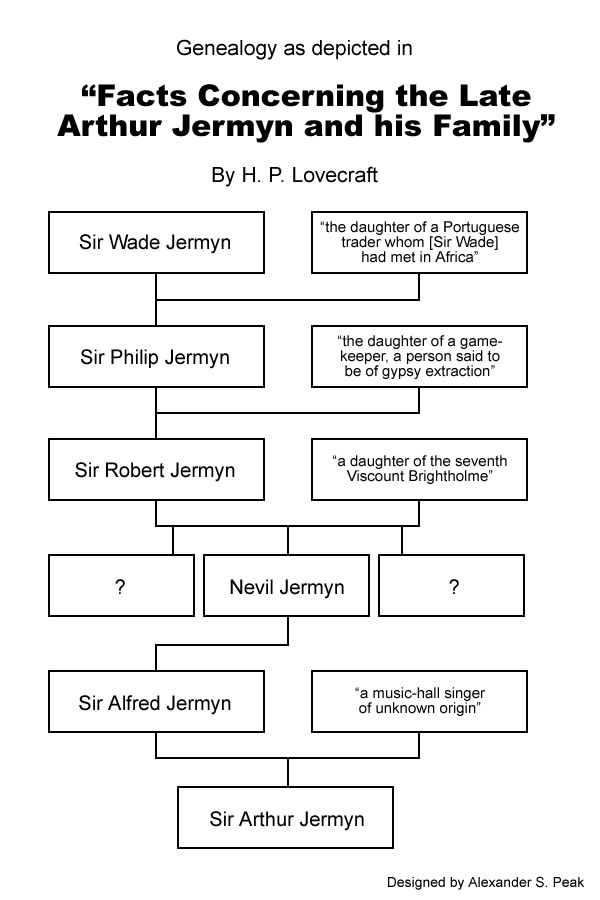
A chart depicting the genealogy of the Jermyn family in the story.

The story begins by describing the ancestors of Sir Arthur Jermyn, an English nobleman. His great-great-great-grandfather was Sir Wade Jermyn, an early explorer of the Congo region whose books on a mysterious white civilization there were ridiculed. Wade returned from his second expedition to the Congo with his wife, reportedly the daughter of a Portuguese trader, and infant son Philip. His wife, described as "violent and singular", was kept in "Oriental seclusion" in Jermyn House, with not even the servants seeing her closely. She accompanied Wade back to Africa on his third and final expedition, from which Sir Wade returned alone. Wade was confined to an asylum in 1765 after raving about "creatures half of the jungle and half of the impiously aged city", dying three years later. Lovecraft describes how the descendants of Wade Jermyn and his mysterious and reclusive wife have had a peculiar physical appearance.

Sir Wade's son, Philip, was described as stupid and prone to fits of violence, with a small, agile, and powerful frame. In 1780, he married the daughter of his gamekeeper, but abandoned his pregnant wife to join the Royal Navy as a common sailor. Following the end of the American Revolutionary War, he joined a merchant ship, from which he disappeared one night as it lay off the Congo coast.

Sir Philip's son, Robert Jermyn, was an ethnologist who studied the African relics brought to Jermyn House by Sir Wade and made two lengthy expeditions into the interior of Africa. Researching legends of the Onga tribe, he observed commonalities between his grandfather's stories and native myths. In 1815, he married a daughter of the (fictional) 7th Viscount Brightholme and fathered three children: his son Nevil and two other children who suffered from severe disabilities and were kept in seclusion. Nevil was described as a "singularly repellent person" who combined his grandfather's pugnaciousness with his mother's haughtiness; in 1849, he eloped with a "vulgar dancer", returning the following year as a widower with his infant son, Alfred. In 1852, Robert met with an explorer, Samuel Seaton, who described Onga legends of a "grey city of white apes ruled by a white god". Robert strangled the explorer to death after hearing this, as well as all three of his children. Nevil managed to save Alfred before his death. Robert was put in an asylum, dying two years later after repeatedly attempting suicide and refusing to speak.

Sir Alfred grew up to inherit the baronetcy. He joined a band of music hall performers, where he married a singer and fathered a child, Arthur. At the age of 36, he abandoned his family to join an American circus, where he became fascinated with a gorilla "of lighter colour than the average". He became its trainer, but was killed in Chicago after staging a boxing match with the gorilla in which the gorilla hurt him with a punch, causing him to attack the gorilla which fatally retaliated.

Sir Arthur inherited the family possessions and lived in Jermyn House with his mother, who used the family's limited remaining resources to send him to the University of Oxford. Arthur is described as having a very unusual appearance, and supposedly the strangest in the line descended from Wade. Arthur became an ethnologist and antiquarian, eventually visiting the Onga and Kaliri regions of the Belgian Congo on a research expedition in 1911. Speaking to an elderly chief, Mwanu, Arthur heard tales of a stone city of "white ape-like creatures", who were wiped out and their city destroyed by the N'bangus. The N'bangus reportedly removed from the sacked city the "Stuffed Goddess", the mummified body of an "ape-princess" who had married a "great white god" who had come from the west. The couple had ruled the city for many years, before leaving when the princess birthed a son. Later, the couple returned to the city, where following the princess' death the "god" preserved and entombed her body and left once again. In 1912, Arthur locates the ruins of the stone city, but is unable to access its vaults. Returning to a trading post, Arthur talks to a Belgian agent, M. Verhaeren, who offers to attempt to obtain the "Stuffed Goddess" from the N'bangus and ship it to Arthur in England.

In June 1913, M. Verhaeren wrote to Arthur confirming he had obtained the body; he noted that the body bears an empty locket with armorial designs, and remarked on the mummy's face. In August 1913, the body arrived at Jermyn House. Arthur began his examination of the mummy, only to run away from his room screaming, and later commit suicide by dousing himself in oil and burning himself alive on the moor outside Jermyn House, bringing the Jermyn family line to an end.

Lovecraft then describes the contents of the stuffed goddess's coffin: the ape goddess has a golden locket around her neck with the Jermyn coat of arms on it and bears a striking resemblance to Arthur. It is clear that Wade's supposedly Portuguese wife was really the "ape-princess", and all of his descendants were the product of their bestial union. Arthur's remains are neither collected nor buried on account of this. The mummy is removed and burnt by the Royal Anthropological Institute of Great Britain and Ireland and the locket thrown in a well.

== Inspiration ==
Both of Lovecraft's parents died in a mental hospital, and some writers have seen a concern with having inherited a propensity for physical and mental degeneration reflected in the plot of his stories, especially his 1931 novella, The Shadow over Innsmouth, which shares some themes with Facts Concerning the Late Arthur Jermyn and His Family. As in many of his stories, the mind of a character deteriorates as his investigations uncover an intolerable reality, a central tenet of Cosmicism which Lovecraft outlines in the opening sentence of "The Call of Cthulhu": "The most merciful thing in the world, I think, is the inability of the human mind to correlate all its contents." In a letter, Lovecraft described the impetus behind Facts Concerning the Late Arthur Jermyn and His Family:

Somebody had been harassing me into reading some work of the iconoclastic moderns — these young chaps who pry behind exteriors and unveil nasty hidden motives and secret stigmata — and I had nearly fallen asleep over the tame backstairs gossip of Anderson's Winesburg, Ohio. The sainted Sherwood, as you know, laid bare the dark area which many whited village lives concealed, and it occurred to me that I, in my weirder medium, could probably devise some secret behind a man's ancestry which would make the worst of Anderson's disclosures sound like the annual report of a Sabbath school. Hence Arthur Jermyn.

While Lovecraft claimed that he intended to describe the most horrible family shadow, E. F. Bleiler declares that "actually, the story is a metaphor for his extreme bigotry and social snobbery; the motifs of expiating ancestral evil and committing suicide on discovering 'racial pollution' occur in other of his works."

=== Publishing history and possible influences ===
The story was first published in the journal The Wolverine in March and June of 1921. To Lovecraft's distaste, the story was retitled "The White Ape" when it appeared in Weird Tales in 1924; he commented: "If I ever entitled a story 'The White Ape', there would be no ape in it." Subsequent reprintings titled it "Arthur Jermyn" until the corrected publishing in Dagon and Other Macabre Tales in 1986.

Critic William Fulwiler suggests that the plot of "Arthur Jermyn" may have been inspired by Edgar Rice Burroughs's novels The Return of Tarzan (1913) and Tarzan and the Jewels of Opar (1916), in which the lost city of Opar is "peopled by a hybrid race resulting from the matings of men with apes." E. F. Bleiler, too, has commented that it "undoubtedly owes much to Edgar Rice Burroughs's Opar in his Tarzan series".

== See also ==
- Humanzee

== Sources ==
- Lovecraft, Howard P. (1999) [1920]. S. T. Joshi (ed.). The Call of Cthulhu and Other Weird Stories (1st printing ed.). Penguin Books. p. 363. ISBN 0-14-118234-2. Explanatory Notes by S. T. Joshi.
- Frye, Mitch, "The Refinement of "Crude Allegory" : Eugenic Themes and Genotypic Horror in the Weird Fiction of H.P. Lovecraft", Journal of the Fantastic in the Arts, vol. 17, issue 3, Fall 2006, pp. 237–254 (JSTOR 26390171).
- Simmons, David, "“A Certain Resemblance”: Abject Hybridity in H. P. Lovecraft's Short Fiction", in New critical essays on H. P. Lovecraft, New York: Palgrave Macmillan, 2013, ISBN 978-1-13-733224-0, pp. 31–54.
