= No One Lives Under the Lighthouse =

2020 videogame

- Developer: Marevo Collective
- Release: PC: April 21, 2020; PS4, PS5, NS, XONE, XSX, XSS: May 18, 2023
- Genres: Horror, adventure

No One Lives Under the Lighthouse is a 2020 horror-adventure game developed by Ukrainian studio Marevo Collective.

== Development ==
The game was developed by independent Ukrainian game developer Marevo Collective and released on April 21, 2020, as a PC game. Marevo Collective and Torture Star Video released the game on PlayStation 4, PlayStation 5, Nintendo Switch, Xbox One and Xbox Series X and Series S on May 18, 2023. Cerulean Games was hired to port the game to consoles.

== Overview ==
Gameplay screenshot

The game's visual style is based on videogames from the PlayStation 1 era, and features simple, low-polygon graphics. The game has a minimalistic user interface without a heads-up display. The game's sound design is also basic, focusing on environmental sound effects rather than music, and with no voiced dialogue. The gameplay focuses on exploration and puzzle-solving as players take on the role of a lighthouse keeper who takes on the job after the previous lighthouse keeper's disappearance. The beginning sequences of the game focus on the repetitive tasks of lighthouse maintenance as supernatural events begin to occur. The setting was compared to Robert Eggers' 2019 film The Lighthouse, which was mentioned by the developer as one of the sources of inspiration.

== Reception ==
The game was praised for its visuals, setting, concept and storytelling, but was criticized for tedious aspects of its gameplay and glitches that were present at launch. Lee Mehr, writing for VGChartz, gave the game seven out of 10 stars. Reyna Cervantes of Bloody Disgusting gave the game 3.5 out of 5 stars, praising its art design and atmosphere but criticizing the gameplay's lack of depth. Timothy Nunes of PlayStation Universe gave the game a 7.5 out of 10, praising its exploration of Lovecraftian horror.
