= Cthulhu: The Cosmic Abyss =

- Developer: Big Bad Wolf
- Publisher: Nacon
- Composer: Nicolas Garcia
- Engine: Unreal Engine 5
- Platforms: PlayStation 5; Windows; Xbox Series X/S
- Release: PlayStation 5, Windows, Xbox Series X/S; 16 April 2026
- Genre: Adventure horror
- Mode: Single-player

Cthulhu: The Cosmic Abyss is an adventure horror game developed by Big Bad Wolf and published by Nacon. The game is inspired by the works of horror fiction author H. P. Lovecraft and the story is set in 2053.

Cthulhu: The Cosmic Abyss was released for PlayStation 5, Windows, and Xbox Series X/S on 16 April 2026.

== Gameplay ==
Cthulhu: The Cosmic Abyss is an adventure horror game with a focus on exploration and investigation while collecting clues to solve eldritch puzzles.

== Synopsis ==
=== Setting ===
Cthulhu: The Cosmic Abyss takes place during 2053.

=== Plot ===
In 2053, Ancile agents Noah, Elsa and their AI companion Key take a boat up the Miskatonic River, which has been flooding more and more in recent years, to check in on Ancile researcher Wong Mei.

== Release ==
The game was announced on March 6th 2025.

== Reception ==
Reception

Aggregate scores
Aggregator	Score
Metacritic	(PC) 66/100 (PS5) 66/100 (XSXS) 68/100
OpenCritic	33% recommend (Note: Based on 55 reviews)

Cthulhu: The Cosmic Abyss received "mixed or average" reviews, according to review aggregator website Metacritic. Fellow review aggregator OpenCritic assessed that the game received fair approval, being recommended by 33% of critics.

== See also ==
- Lovecraftian horror
- Lovecraft Country
