= The Call of the Void (podcast) =

Science fiction and horror podcast

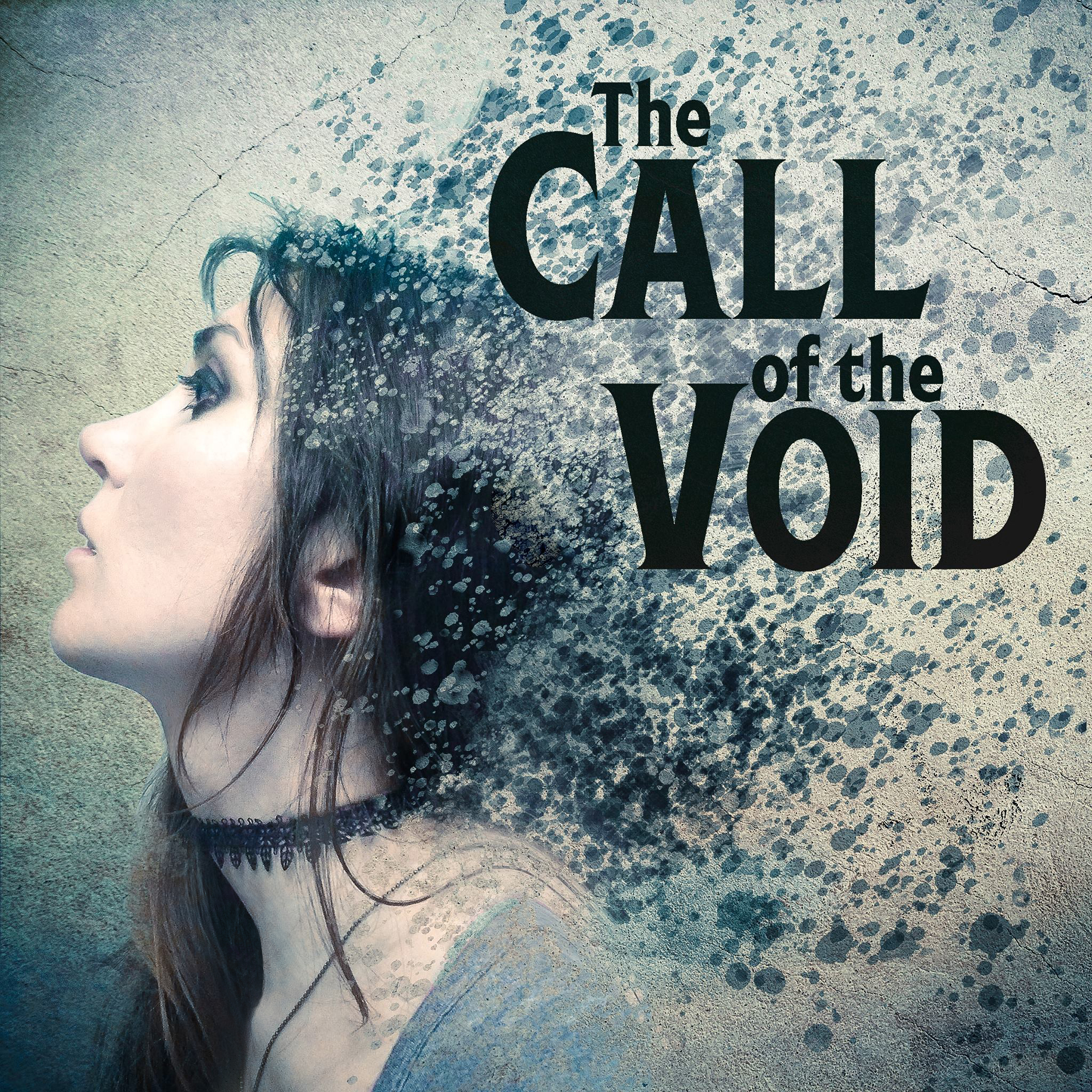
- Official show poster
- Running time: 20-25 min
- Country of origin: USA
- Language: English
- Starring: Josie Eli Herman; Michael Alan Herman; Amanda Buchalter; Dan Johnson; Annie Dilworth; Jonathan Davidson
- Created by: Josie Eli Herman; Michael Alan Herman
- Written by: Michael Alan Herman; Josie Eli Herman
- Directed by: Josie Eli Herman
- Original release: January 9, 2020 – June 23, 2022
- No. of episodes: 28
- Website: www.acornartsandentertainment.com/thevoid

The Call of the Void Podcast is an audio drama podcast created and written by Josie Eli Herman and Michael Alan Herman. The story takes place in modern day New Orleans and incorporates elements of cosmic horror and weird fiction. The Call of the Void won a Webby Award.

== Background ==
The podcast contains three seasons of episodes with a cast of about 35 actors.

== Plot ==
Set in New Orleans, Topher Sommers (a local tour guide) and Etsy Delmen (a palm reader) team up to battle a mysterious entity that longs to bring the world into perfect stillness.

== Reception ==
The show was part of the official selection of the UK International Radio Drama Festival, was honored by the Webby Awards in 2023, and has been showcased on numerous lists for top audio fiction, including BuzzFeed.

== Cast ==
=== Season 1 ===
- Bruce Bennett as Victor Sommers
- Amanda Buchalter as Simone Sommers
- Mary Clairmont as Janis Fletcher
- Tim Clairmont as Dr. Wilkhart
- Mat De Lisle as Baker
- Annie Dilworth as Hannah Pauling / Nox
- David Galido as Hogan Jones
- Julia Garlotte as Dr. Joanne Delmen
- Angel Geter as Lottie / Nurse Abigail
- James Herman as James Herman
- Josie Eli Herman as Etsy Delmen
- Michael Alan Herman as Topher Sommers
- Dan Johnson as Officer Mason / Necromon
- Paul Lapczynski as Sheriff Paul
- Roni Lapczynski as Charlie the Checkout Girl
- Allyson Miko as Nurse Johnson
- Kellie Stonebrook as Professor Navarro
- Barbaro Tran Suarez as Marcus Fletcher
- Joe Zettelmaier as Walt Rogers / Malcolm Delmen

=== Season 2 ===
- Bruce Bennett as Victor Sommers
- Kryssy Becker as Peyton Miller / Dr. Jenner
- Amanda Buchalter as Simone Sommers
- Matt Cameron as Emerson Parker / The Organist
- Mary Clairmont as The Apartment Assistant
- Tim Clairmont as Ernest the Prison Guard
- Jonathan Davidson as Jonah
- Mat De Lisle as Baker
- Annie Dilworth as Fargo Kaminski
- Jessica Dudek as KP
- Craig Ester as Lester Thompson / JM Labs Council Member
- Julia Garlotte as Dr. Joanne Delmen / Olivia
- Angel Geter as Lottie
- James Herman as Little Brother
- Josie Eli Herman as Etsy Delmen
- Matthew Herman as Odin at the Voodoo Shop / Graduation Announcer
- Michael Alan Herman as Topher Sommers
- Dan Johnson as Officer Mason / Necromon
- Paul Lapczynski as Rando / Police Officer
- Billy and Georgie Lapczynski as Martin Brody
- Allison Megroet as Dani Parker
- Jackie Meloche as Miles
- Vicki Morgan as Marley Thompson / Ashley the Waitress
- Scotty Schlueter as Mitchell Lou
- Shelby Seeley as London / Monica
- Mark Ujik as Carson
- Joe Zettelmaier as Malcolm Delmen / Documentarian

=== Season 3 ===
- Kryssy Becker as Gwyneth O'Conner
- Emily Betz as Riley / Brooklyn the LA Waitress / Casino Voice
- Amanda Buchalter as Simone Sommers
- Callie Bussell as Tera Grace Reinhart
- Nick Casella as Fry / Correctional Officer
- Tim Clairmont as Jacko
- David Collins as Beau / Chesney Price
- Celah Convis - Taylor the Checkout Girl / Showgirl
- Jonathan Davidson as Jonah
- Annie Dilworth as Fargo Kaminski
- Jayla Fletcher as Ivy / Becky Mason
- Julia Garlotte as Dr. Joanne Delmen
- Linda Rabin Hammell as Meg the Trucker / Margie
- Josie Eli Herman as Etsy Delmen
- Michael Alan Herman as Topher Sommers
- Erin Isely as Sous Chef / Theatre Patron / Mae
- Dan Johnson as Officer Mason / Necromon
- Paul Lapczynski as Deputy Paul / Murphy's Bartender
- Billy and Georgie Lapczynski as Martin Brody
- Allison Megroet as Dani Parker
- Jeffrey Shawn Miller as Professor Andrew Fulton
- Will Myers as The Whispermen / The Lighthouse Keeper
- Tim Pollack as Zeke / Leroy Benjamin
- Mike Sandusky as Jason / Steven the Researcher
- Josh Weber as Eli Cohen
- Mark Ujik as Gibby
- Joe Zettelmaier as Malcolm Delmen & Tony the Sheriff

== Awards ==
Award	Date	Category	Recipient	Result	Ref.
Hear Now Festival	2020	Platinum Selections for Science Fiction	The Call of the Void	Won	
Audio Verse Awards	2020	Vocal Direction of a New Production	Josie Eli Herman	Won	
Audio Verse Awards	2020	Performance of a Supporting Role in a New Audio PlayProduction	Amanda Buchalter	Won	
Hear Now Festival	2021	Platinum Selections for Science Fiction	The Call of the Void	Won	
Hermes Creative Awards	2021	Platinum Winner	The Call of the Void	Won	
NJ Web Festival	2021	Outstanding Science Fiction	The Call of the Void	Nominated	
NJ Web Festival	2021	Best Series Premise of a Narrative Fiction	The Call of the Void	Nominated	
NJ Web Festival	2021	Best Leading Performance	Michael Alan Herman	Nominated	
NZ Web Festival	2022	Official Selection for International Fiction Podcast	The Call of the Void	Won	
NJ Web Festival	2022	Outstanding Science Fiction	The Call of the Void	Nominated	
NJ Web Festival	2022	Best Direction	Josie Eli Herman	Nominated	
NJ Web Festival	2022	Best Writing	Josie Eli Herman / Michael Alan Herman	Nominated	
NJ Web Festival	2022	Best Cover Art	Josie Eli Herman	Nominated	
NJ Web Festival	2022	Best Chemistry	Michael Alan Herman / Allison Megroet	Nominated	
Minnesota Web Festival	2022	Best Horror Podcast	The Call of the Void	Won	
The Webby Awards	2022	Honoree for Best Scripted Series (Fiction)	The Call of the Void	Won	
