= Cosmicism =

Literary philosophy

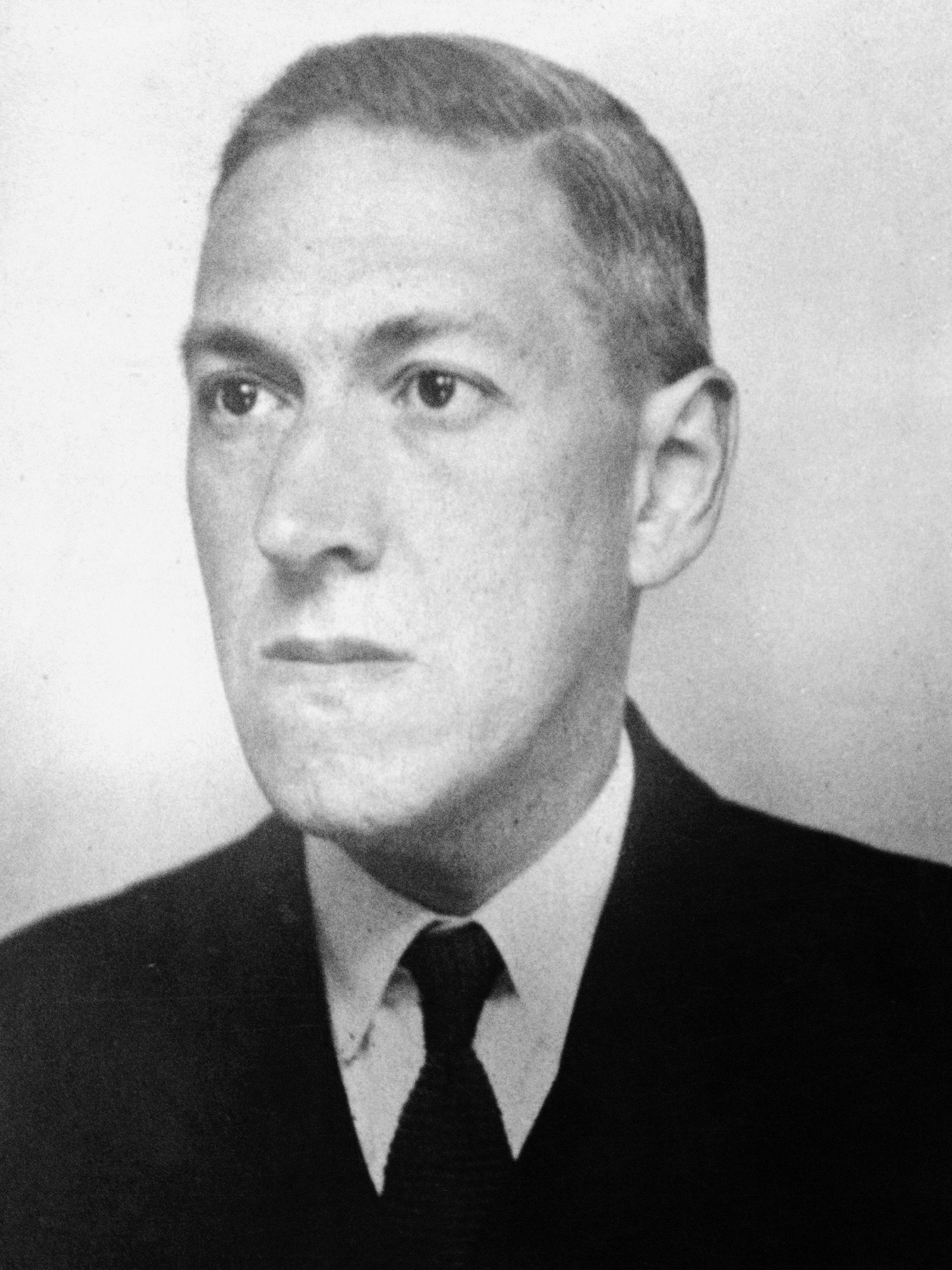
H. P. Lovecraft, writer and creator of cosmicism.

Cosmicism is a name given to the literary philosophy that H. P. Lovecraft developed and used for his fiction. The name is commonly stated to have been coined by Lovecraft himself, though no sources that state this claim provide any statements by Lovecraft himself using it. Lovecraft was a writer of horror stories that involve occult phenomena like astral projection and alien miscegenation, and the themes of his fiction over time contributed to the development of this philosophy.

The philosophy of cosmicism is explained as the idea that "there is no recognizable divine presence, such as a god, in the universe, and that humans are particularly insignificant in the larger scheme of intergalactic existence." The most prominent theme is humanity's fear of their insignificance in an incomprehensibly large universe: a fear of the cosmic void.

== Analysis ==
Cosmicism and human centric views of the universe are incompatible. Cosmicism shares many characteristics with nihilism, though one important difference is that cosmicism tends to emphasize the insignificance of humanity and its doings, rather than summarily rejecting the possible existence of some greater purpose (or purposes); e.g., in Lovecraft's Cthulhu stories. It is not the absence of meaning that causes terror for the protagonists, as it is their discovery that they have absolutely no power to change anything in the vast, indifferent universe that surrounds them. In Lovecraft's stories, whatever meaning or purpose may be invested in the actions of the cosmic beings is completely inaccessible to the human characters.

Lovecraft's cosmicism was a result of his feeling of humanity's existential helplessness due to what he called the "infinite spaces" revealed by science, and his belief that humanity was fundamentally at the mercy of the vastness and emptiness of the cosmos. In his fictional works, these ideas are often described by fantastic dream-like narratives (The Dream-Quest of Unknown Kadath, 1927), by his well-known Cthulhu Mythos ("The Call of Cthulhu," 1928, and others), and sometimes by humor ("Herbert West–Reanimator", 1922). Common themes related to cosmicism in Lovecraft's fiction are the insignificance of humanity in the universe and the search for knowledge ending with disaster.

Lovecraftian characters notably become insane from the elimination of recognizable geometry. Lovecraft's work also tended to suggest fear of the other to the reader, such as in the stories "The Dunwich Horror" and "Dagon", often describing that which is unknown as a terrible threat to humanity.

== Cosmic indifferentism ==
Though cosmicism seems pessimistic, Lovecraft thought of himself as neither a pessimist nor an optimist but rather a "scientific" or "cosmic" indifferentist, a theme expressed in his fiction. In Lovecraft's work, human beings are often subject to powerful beings and other cosmic forces, but these forces are not so much malevolent as they are indifferent toward humanity. This indifference is an important theme in cosmicism. The noted Lovecraft scholar S. T. Joshi asserts that "Lovecraft constantly engaged in (more or less) genial debates on religion with several colleagues, notably the pious writer and teacher Maurice W. Moe. Lovecraft made no bones about being a complete atheist, and he considered religion not merely false but dangerous to social and political progress." As such, Lovecraft's cosmicism is not religious at all, but rather a version of his mechanistic materialism. Lovecraft thus embraced a philosophy of cosmic indifferentism. He believed in a meaningless, mechanical, and uncaring universe that human beings, with their naturally limited faculties, could never understand completely. His personal beliefs made no allowance for religious claims which could not be evidenced scientifically. The incomprehensible, cosmic forces of his tales have as little regard for humanity as humans have for insects.

Though irreligious personally, Lovecraft used various gods as characters in his stories, particularly the Cthulhu-related tales, to expound cosmicism. However, Lovecraft never conceived of them as supernatural, but extraterrestrials who understand and obey a set of natural laws which to human understanding seem magical. These beings (the Great Old Ones, Outer Gods and others) – though dangerous to humankind – are portrayed as neither good nor evil, and human notions of morality have no significance for these beings. Indeed, they exist in cosmic realms beyond human understanding. As a symbol, this is representative of the kind of universe that Lovecraft believed in. Though some of these beings have – and in some cases create – cults to honor them, to the vast majority of these beings the human race is so insignificant that they are not given any consideration whatsoever.

== See also ==
- Absurdism – Theory that life is meaningless
- Apatheism – Apathy toward the existence or non-existence of God
- Determinism – Belief that events are determined by prior ones
- Existential nihilism – Theory that life has no inherent meaning
- Existentialism – Philosophy dealing with absurdity of existence
- Fatalism – Philosophical doctrine on the subjugation of all events to fate
- Lovecraftian horror – Subgenre of horror
- Misanthropy – General dislike of humanity
- Misotheism – Hatred of God or the gods
