= Shipbuilding in the early modern period =

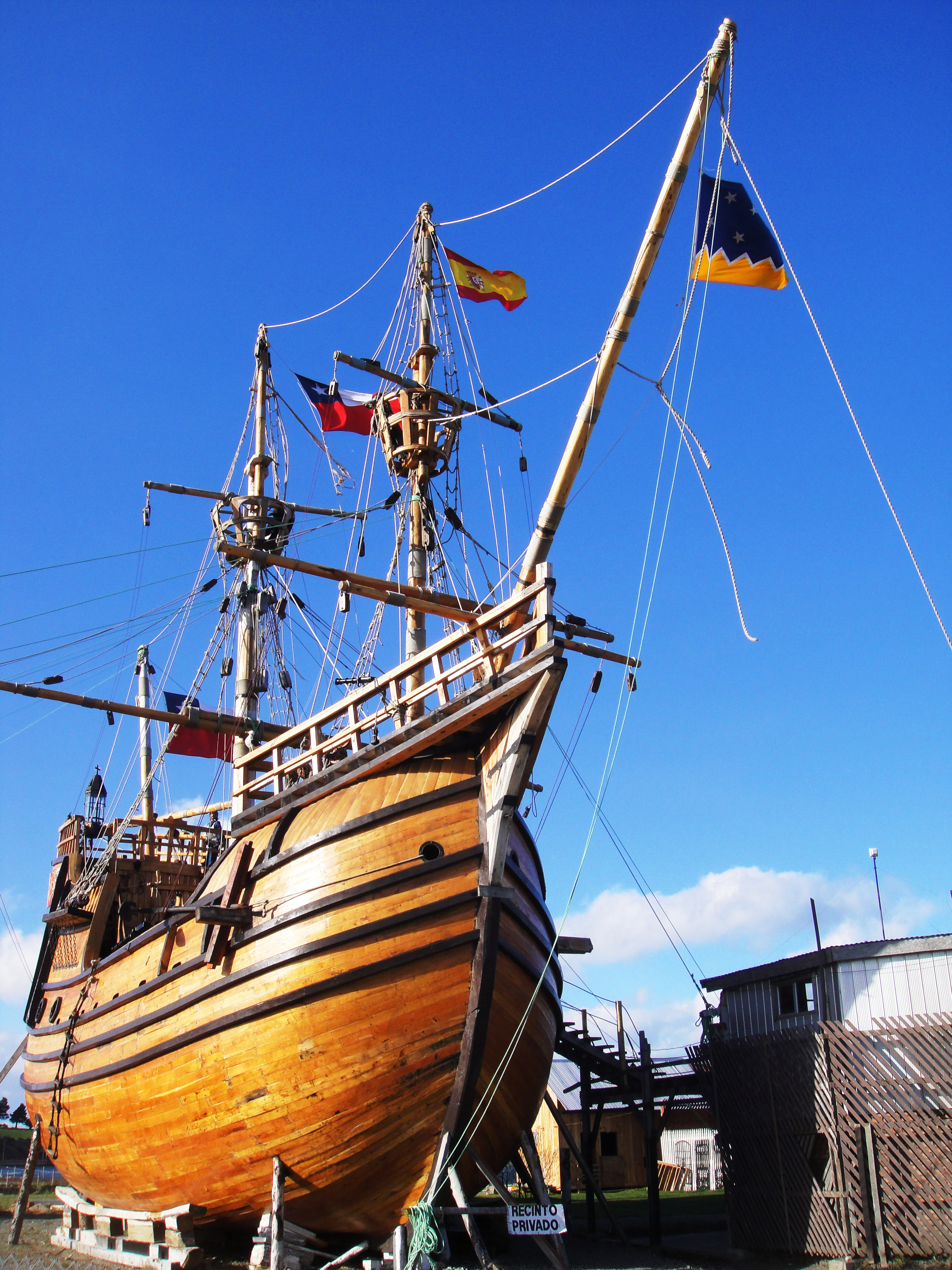
A replica of Nao named Victoria, one of the ships that participated in Ferdinand Magellan's voyage to circumnavigate the globe in 1519

Maritime travel experienced a large leap in the capabilities of seafaring vessels thanks to technological improvements in shipbuilding in the early modern era. Europe, Asia, and the Middle East all saw improvements on prior construction techniques, contributing to the Age of Discovery. As a result, the introduction of these technologies in the production of naval vessels was critical as they allowed nations that utilized these advancements to ascend to a state that could expand its influence at a far greater range. In military engagements, the exploration of new lands and potential colonies, or the transportation of goods for trade, better shipbuilding techniques coincided with prosperity. It is during this time that the practice of naval architecture appeared, as skilled designers could produce designs that had an enormous impact in ship performance and capabilities.

== History ==
In the Middle Ages that preceded the early modern era, shipbuilding mainly utilized clinker building techniques, in which wooden hull planks were laid in an overlapping fashion so that they were both easier to construct and lighter. A common form of a clinker-built ship was the Nordic longship, associated with the vikings. These vessels had the advantage of allowing a certain degree of twisting. However, carvel construction techniques, which involve hull planks being laid smoothly next to each other, allowed for much larger vessels that displaced more water, allowing for a much larger cargo capacity, which is necessary for long distance maritime travel.

== European designs ==
A popular design of European origin is the carrack, which utilized caravel construction techniques, allowing ships to increase in size dramatically, far past that which was capable with clinker building techniques. Seen throughout the 14th and 15th century, these ships were used for trade between European powers and their foreign markets. The carrack featured anywhere from three to four masts, dominating ship designs until it was superseded by the galleon in the 16th century.

The galleon featured a similar design to the carrack as it involved multiple sails and was much larger than vessels before it. With multiple decks, these ships allowed for both military and commercial use as the large cargo space allowed for the transportation of goods and multiple decks allowed for a large armament of cannons. This design saw a great amount of usage as European powers established overseas colonial empires. The Dutch fluyt ship could be recognized as a similar design to a galleon due to its pear-shaped hull.

A common feature of European designs was the consideration for a large degree of armament as colonial powers had to defend from both aggressive rival European traders and pirates seeking to plunder goods.

== Asian designs ==
Many of the ships that were developed in Asia were characterized by a series of traits. For example, flat-bottomed craft were often prevalent in many Chinese vessels and were adapted for navigating in the shallow waters of the rivers that are common in China. For example, the Chinese treasure ship, known for its usage during Zheng He's seven voyages to bring distant goods and establish political and economic relationships with foreign powers.

The most prevalent ship design originating from Asia during this era was the junk, which was developed centuries earlier in Ancient China during the Han dynasty. Known for its battened sail and close to the water line stature, junks saw usage in both shallow waters and extensive ocean voyages.

== Middle Eastern designs ==
Largely due to the absence of a large, oceanic body of water situated by the Middle East, most shipbuilding designs reflected that of shallow water vessels or iterations meant to prepare the ship for deep-sea voyage. The dhow was a long-hulled boat that was utilized for trading extensively in the Islamic world. In the early modern era, Middle Eastern shipbuilding stagnated for the most part. However, dhows did receive a variety of adjustments in order to suit the goals of global trade of this time period.

The baghlah allowed for greater range as it was a dhow scaled up to include a greater number of sails and larger cargo hold. These modifications to the traditional dhow allowed it travel much further, even as far as the Spice Islands.

== North and South American designs ==
During this time, indigenous populations were limited to basic vessels that were constructed in previous eras. However, colonizing Europeans powers utilized their ship technology to traverse the Atlantic Ocean to access the New World.
