= H. P. Lovecraft: Against the World, Against Life =

1991 book by Michel Houellebecq

- Cover artwork to the American and UK edition
- Author: Michel Houellebecq
- Original title: H. P. Lovecraft : Contre le monde, contre la vie
- Translator: Dorna Khazeni
- Language: French
- Subject: H. P. Lovecraft
- Publication date: 1991
- Publication place: France
- English publication date: May 2005
- Media type: Print
- Pages: 150 pp
- ISBN: 1-932416-18-8
- OCLC: 60350259

H. P. Lovecraft: Against the World, Against Life (French: H. P. Lovecraft : Contre le monde, contre la vie) is a work of literary criticism by French author Michel Houellebecq regarding the works of H. P. Lovecraft. The English-language edition for the American and UK market was translated by Dorna Khazeni and features an introduction by American novelist Stephen King. In some editions the book also includes two of Lovecraft's best known short stories: "The Call of Cthulhu" and "The Whisperer in Darkness."

== Overview ==
In this early published work (which he calls his "first novel"), Houellebecq describes having discovered Lovecraft as a teenager and being struck by how each story was, as he describes, "an open slice of howling fear." He describes a fascination with Lovecraft's anti-modernity, what he supposes is Lovecraft's profound hatred of life and philosophical denial of the real world; Houellebecq notes that his works include "not a single allusion to two of the realities to which we generally ascribe great importance: sex and money." He posits Lovecraft as an American existentialist for whom both life and death are meaningless. He also praises what he sees as Lovecraft's rejection of democracy and progressivism.

Also noted is Houellebecq's exegesis of Lovecraft's racial preoccupations, which he traces to a 24-month period during which Lovecraft lived in the comparatively racially mixed New York City of the 1920s, where, Houellebecq says, Lovecraft learned to take "racism back to its essential and most profound core: fear." He notes the recurring image in Lovecraft's fiction of a mammoth, hideous city teeming with terrifying beings.

Houellebecq's acceptance of Schopenhauer's philosophy had a marked influence on his reaction to Lovecraft.
