= Cthulhu =

Fictional cosmic entity

- Cthulhu Mythos character
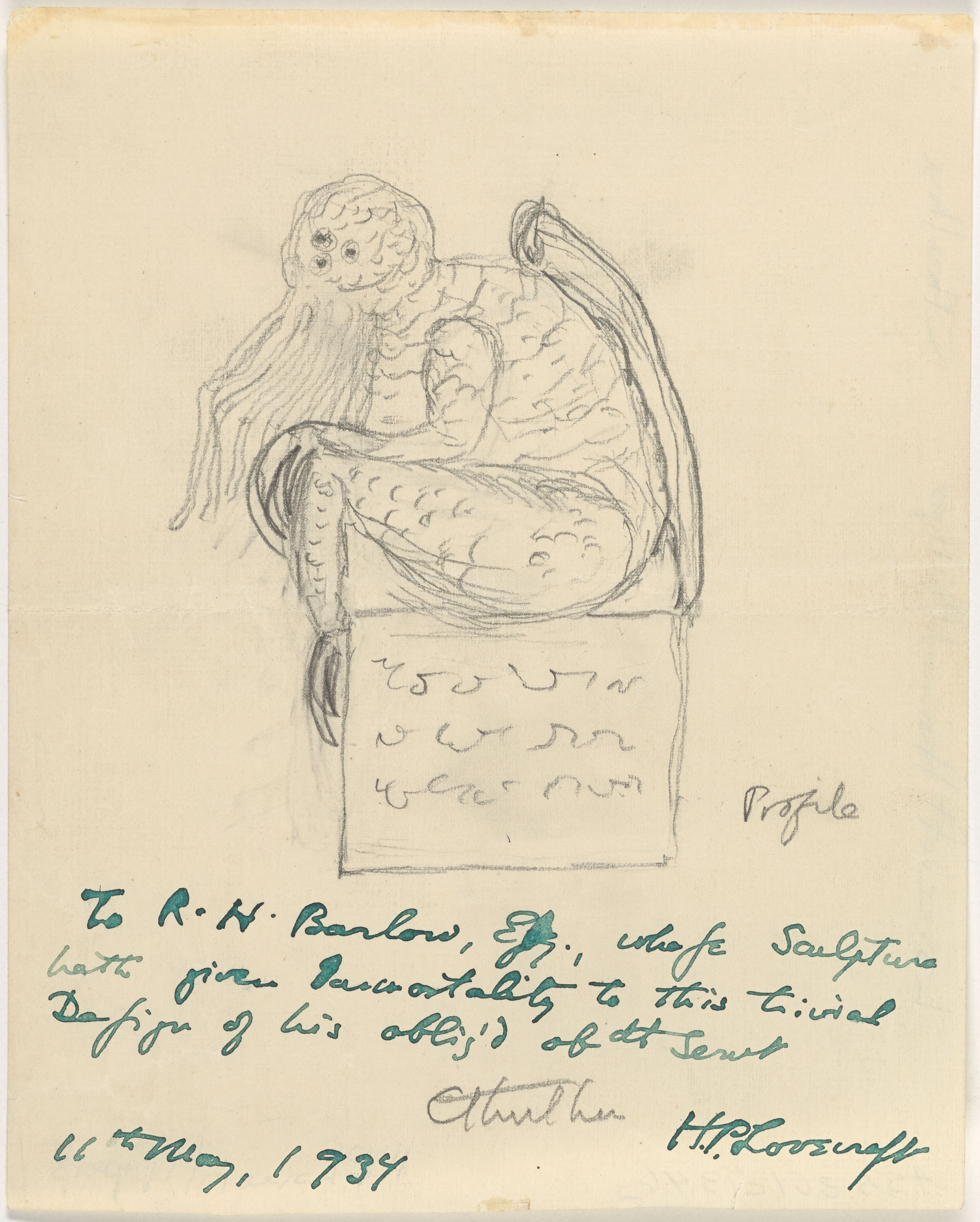
- Sketch of Cthulhu drawn by Lovecraft (11 May 1934)
- First appearance: "The Call of Cthulhu" (1928)
- Created by: H. P. Lovecraft

In-universe information
- Aliases: The Sleeper of R'lyeh; High Priest of the Great Old Ones
- Species: Great Old One
- Gender: Male
- Relatives: Azathoth (great-great-grandfather); Yog-Sothoth (grandfather); Shub-Niggurath (grandmother); Nug (parent)
- Home: R'lyeh

Cthulhu is a fictional cosmic entity created by writer H. P. Lovecraft. The character was introduced in his short story "The Call of Cthulhu", published by the American pulp magazine Weird Tales in 1928. Considered a Great Old One within the pantheon of Lovecraftian cosmic entities, he is depicted as a gigantic entity worshipped by cultists, in a green humanoid form incorporating visual elements similar to an octopus and a dragon. As the namesake of the Lovecraft-inspired Cthulhu Mythos, Cthulhu has since been featured in numerous pop culture references.

== Etymology, spelling, and pronunciation ==
Invented by Lovecraft in 1926, (Note: This is the date that the story "The Call of Cthulhu" was written.) the name Cthulhu was probably chosen to echo the word chthonic (Ancient Greek "of the earth"), as apparently suggested by Lovecraft himself at the end of his 1923 tale "The Rats in the Walls". The chthonic, or earth-dwelling, spirit has precedents in numerous ancient and medieval mythologies, often guarding mines and precious underground treasures, notably in the Germanic dwarfs and the Greek Chalybes, Telchines, or Dactyls.

Lovecraft transcribed the pronunciation of Cthulhu as Khlûl′-hloo, and said, "the first syllable pronounced gutturally and very thickly. The 'u' is about like that in 'full', and the first syllable is not unlike 'klul' in sound, hence the 'h' represents the guttural thickness" yielding something akin to /qlʊlʕluː/. According to Lovecraft, this is merely the closest that the human vocal apparatus can come to reproducing the syllables of an alien language. S. T. Joshi points out, however, that Lovecraft gave different pronunciations on different occasions. Cthulhu has also been spelled in many other ways, including Tulu, Katulu, and Kutulu.

After Lovecraft's death, Chaosium stated in the Call of Cthulhu role-playing game: "we say it kuh-THOOL-hu" (/kəˈθuːluː/), while noting that Lovecraft pronounced it differently. The pronunciation /kəˈtuːluː/ is also used.

== Description ==
In "The Call of Cthulhu", H. P. Lovecraft describes a statue of Cthulhu as: "A monster of vaguely anthropoid outline, but with an octopus-like head whose face was a mass of feelers, a scaly, rubbery-looking body, prodigious claws on hind and fore feet, and long, narrow wings behind." A carving of Cthulhu is described thus: "It seemed to be a sort of monster, or symbol representing a monster, of a form which only a diseased fancy could conceive. If I say that my somewhat extravagant imagination yielded simultaneous pictures of an octopus, a dragon, and a human caricature, I shall not be unfaithful to the spirit of the thing. A pulpy, tentacled head surmounted a grotesque and scaly body with rudimentary wings."

Johansen in "The Call of Cthulhu" states that "The Thing cannot be described—there is no language for such abysms of shrieking and immemorial lunacy, such eldritch contradictions of all matter, force, and cosmic order. A mountain walked or stumbled." Cthulhu is described again shortly thereafter as a "mountainous monstrosity". His age is described to be at least "vigintillions of years". He is also said to have cast spells which preserved the Great Old Ones until their reawakening.

Cthulhu is said to be hundreds of meters tall, with webbed, human-looking arms and legs. Its head is depicted as similar to the entirety of a gigantic octopus, with an unknown number of tentacles surrounding its supposed mouth.

== Publication history ==
The short story that first mentions Cthulhu, "The Call of Cthulhu", was published in Weird Tales in 1928, and established the character as a malevolent entity, hibernating within R'lyeh, an underwater city in the South Pacific. The imprisoned Cthulhu is apparently the source of constant subconscious anxiety for all mankind, and is also the object of worship, both by many human cults (including some within New Zealand, Greenland, Louisiana, and the Chinese mountains) and by other Lovecraftian monsters (called Deep Ones and Mi-Go). The short story asserts the premise that, while currently trapped, Cthulhu will eventually return. His worshippers chant "Ph'nglui mglw'nafh Cthulhu R'lyeh wgah'nagl fhtagn" ("In his house at R'lyeh, dead Cthulhu waits dreaming").

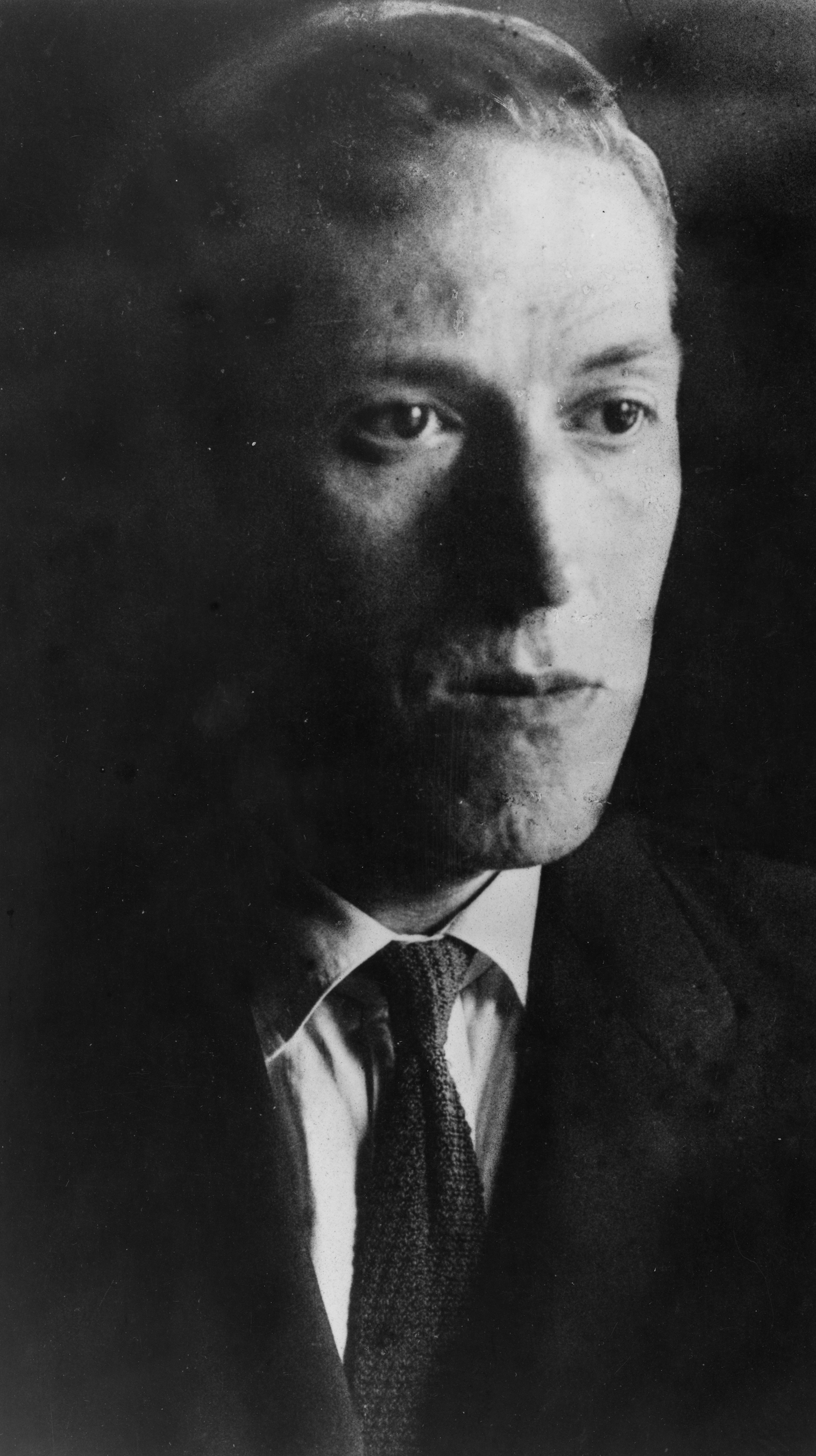
H. P. Lovecraft, Cthulhu's creator

Lovecraft conceived a detailed genealogy for Cthulhu (published as "Letter 617" in Selected Letters) and made the character a central reference in his works. The short story "The Dunwich Horror" (1928) refers to Cthulhu, while The Whisperer in Darkness (1930) hints that one of his characters knows the creature's origins ("I learned whence Cthulhu first came, and why half the great temporary stars of history had flared forth.") The 1931 novella At the Mountains of Madness refers to the "star-spawn of Cthulhu", who warred with another race called the Elder Things before the dawn of man.

August Derleth, a correspondent of Lovecraft's, used the creature's name to identify the system of lore employed by Lovecraft and his literary successors, the Cthulhu Mythos. From 1932-33, Derleth wrote the short story "The Return of Hastur", and proposed two groups of opposed cosmic entities:

the Old or Ancient Ones, the Elder Gods, of cosmic good, and those of cosmic evil, bearing many names, and themselves of different groups, as if associated with the elements and yet transcending them: for there are the Water Beings, hidden in the depths; those of Air that are the primal lurkers beyond time; those of Earth, horrible animate survivors of distant eons.

According to Derleth's scheme, "Great Cthulhu is one of the Water Elementals" and was engaged in an age-old arch-rivalry with a designated air elemental, Hastur the Unspeakable, described as Cthulhu's "half-brother." Based on this framework, Derleth wrote a series of short stories published in Weird Tales (1944–1952) and collected as The Trail of Cthulhu, depicting the struggle of a Dr. Laban Shrewsbury and his associates against Cthulhu and his minions. In addition, Cthulhu is referenced in Derleth's 1945 novel The Lurker at the Threshold published by Arkham House. The novel can also be found in The Watchers Out of Time and Others, a collection of stories from Derleth's interpretations of Lovecraftian Mythos published by Arkham House in 1974.

Derleth's interpretations have been criticized by Lovecraft enthusiast Michel Houellebecq, among others. Houellebecq's H. P. Lovecraft: Against the World, Against Life (2005) decries Derleth for attempting to reshape Lovecraft's strictly amoral continuity into a stereotypical conflict between forces of objective good and evil.

In Brian Lumley's Titus Crow series, Cthulhu is depicted as the king of the Great Old Ones—with the exception of Azathoth—a departure from the traditional canon. In this series, Cthulhu is depicted as a deity of higher rank than Yog-Sothoth and Nyarlathotep; he forms the Cthulhu Cycle Deities, centered around himself, and is in conflict with his blood relative, the Elder God Kthanid. It is also suggested that the entity Johansen encountered was not Cthulhu himself, but merely one of his Star-Spawn.

In John Glasby's "A Shadow from the Aeons", Cthulhu is seen by the narrator roaming the riverbank near Dominic Waldron's castle, and roaring.

The character's influence also extended into gaming literature; games company TSR included an entire chapter on the Cthulhu mythos (including character statistics) in the first printing of Dungeons & Dragons sourcebook Deities & Demigods (1980). TSR, however, were unaware that Arkham House, which asserted copyright on almost all Lovecraft literature, had already licensed the Cthulhu property to game company Chaosium. Although Chaosium stipulated that TSR could continue to use the material if each future edition featured a published credit to Chaosium, TSR refused and the material was removed from all subsequent editions. Cthulhu returned to the setting in the 2026 sourcebook Ravenloft: The Horrors Within.

== Influence ==
=== Politics ===
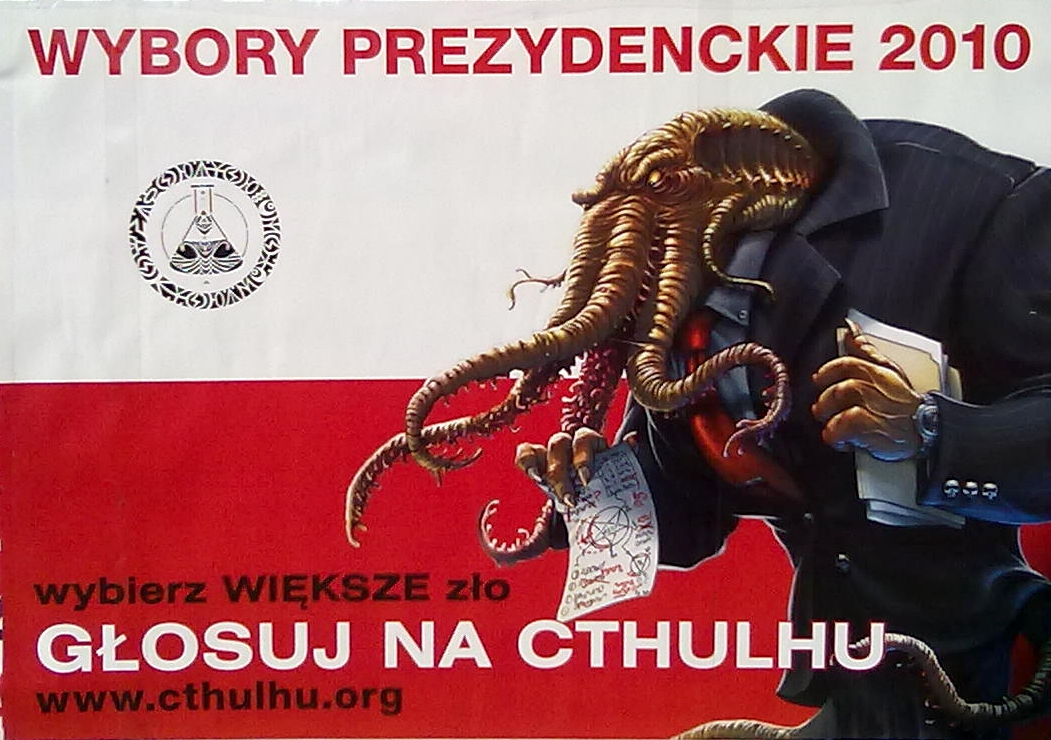
Poster from the 2010 Polish presidential election: The caption translates as "Choose the greater evil. Vote Cthulhu."

Cthulhu has appeared as a parody candidate in several elections, including the 2010 Polish presidential election and the 2012 and 2016 US presidential elections. The faux campaigns usually satirize voters who claim to vote for the "lesser evil". "Cthulhu for America" ran during the 2016 American presidential election, drawing comparisons with other satirical presidential candidates such as Vermin Supreme. The organization had a platform that included the legalization of human sacrifice, driving all Americans insane, and an end to peace.

=== Science ===
Several organisms have been named after Cthulhu, including the California spider Pimoa cthulhu, the New Guinea moth Speiredonia cthulhui, and Sollasina cthulhu, a fossil echinoderm. Two microorganisms that assist in the digestion of wood by termites have been named after Cthulhu and Cthulhu's "daughter" Cthylla: Cthulhu macrofasciculumque and Cthylla microfasciculumque.

In 2014, science and technology scholar Donna Haraway gave a talk, "Anthropocene, Capitalocene, Chthulucene: Staying with the Trouble", in which she proposed the term Chthulucene as an alternative for the concept of the Anthropocene era, due to the entangling interconnectedness of all supposedly individual beings. Haraway has denied any indebtedness to Lovecraft's Cthulhu, claiming that her chthulu is derived from Greek khthonios, "of the earth". However, the Lovecraft character is much closer to her coined term than the Greek root, and her description of its meaning coincides with Lovecraft's idea of the apocalyptic, multitentacled threat of Cthulhu to collapse civilization into an endless dark horror: "Chthulucene does not close in on itself; it does not round off; its contact zones are ubiquitous and continuously spin out loopy tendrils."

In July 2015, an elongated, dark region along the equator of Pluto, initially referred to as "the Whale", was proposed to be named "Cthulhu Regio", by the NASA team responsible for the New Horizons mission. The team changed the informal name to "Cthulhu Macula" later that year, as they considered it to be a macula. The International Astronomical Union did not follow the proposal, and the feature was officially named "Belton Regio" in 2023.
