= The Call of Cthulhu =

1928 short story by H. P. Lovecraft

- Short story by H. P. Lovecraft
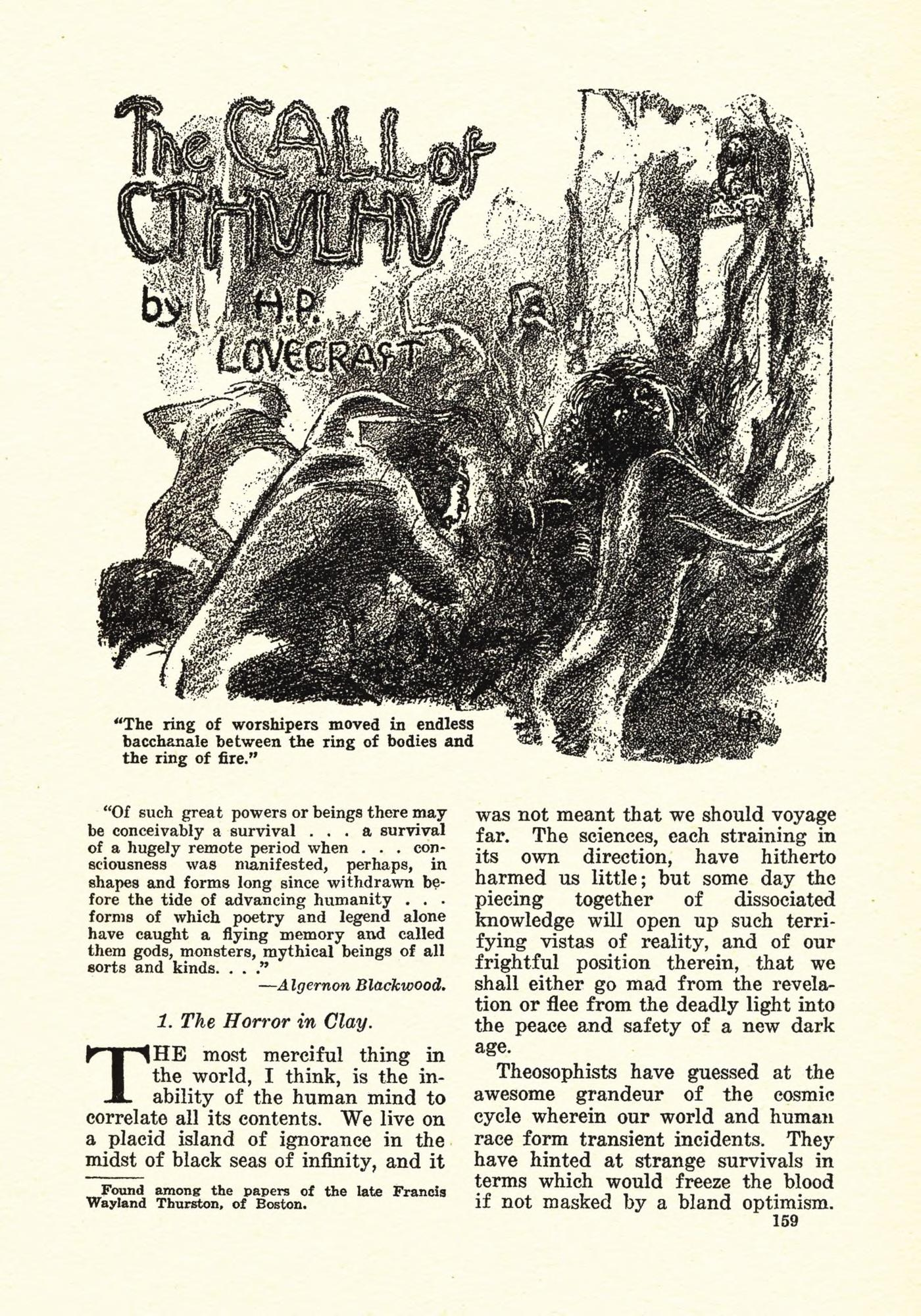
- Title page of "The Call of Cthulhu" as it appeared in Weird Tales, February 1928. Illustration by Hugh Doak Rankin.

Text available at Wikisource
- Country: United States of America
- Language: English
- Genre: Cosmic horror

Publication
- Published in: Weird Tales
- Media type: Print
- Publication date: February 1928

"The Call of Cthulhu" is a cosmic horror short story by American writer H. P. Lovecraft. Written in the summer of 1926, it was first published in the pulp magazine Weird Tales in February 1928.

The story is a founding document of the Cthulhu Mythos, a mythopoeia and shared fictional universe expanded upon by Lovecraft and successors.

== Plot ==
The deceased narrator, Francis Wayland Thurston, recounts his discovery of notes left behind by his grand-uncle, Brown University linguistic professor George Gammell Angell, after his earlier death in the winter of 1926–27. Among the notes is a small bas-relief sculpture of a scaly creature which yields "simultaneous pictures of an octopus, a dragon, and a human caricature." The sculptor, a Rhode Island art student named Henry Anthony Wilcox, based the work on delirious dreams of "great Cyclopean cities of titan blocks and sky-flung monoliths." Frequent references to Cthulhu and R'lyeh are found in Wilcox's papers. Angell also discovers reports of mass hysteria around the world.

More notes discuss a 1908 meeting of an archeological society in which New Orleans police official John Raymond Legrasse asks attendees to identify a statuette of unidentifiable greenish-black stone resembling Wilcox's sculpture. Legrasse had obtained the sculpture the previous year, when he led a party of policemen on a raid into a swamp which surprised a bizarre cult holding a bacchanal ritual with human sacrifice. After killing five of the cultists and arresting 47 others, Legrasse learns that they worship the "Great Old Ones" and await the return of a monstrous being called Cthulhu. The prisoners identify the statuette as "great Cthulhu." One of the archaeologists consulted at the meeting, Princeton professor William Channing Webb, had once encountered a group of "Esquimaux" with similar beliefs and fetishes.

The sinister import of the notes becomes clear when Thurston coincidentally comes across a 1925 article from an Australian newspaper which reports the discovery of a derelict ship, the Alert, of which second mate Gustaf Johansen is the sole survivor. Johansen reports that he was originally aboard a second vessel, the Emma, when it was attacked by pirates aboard the Alert, a heavily armed yacht. The crewmen of the Emma killed the pirates but lost their own ship in the battle, commandeered the Alert, and discovered an uncharted island in the vicinity of co-ordinates of 47°9′S 126°43′W. With the exception of Johansen and another man, the remaining crew died on the island in a mysterious fashion.

Upon traveling to Australia, Thurston views a statue retrieved from the Alert which is identical to the previous two. After traveling to Norway, he learns that Johansen died suddenly after an encounter with "two Lascar sailors". Johansen's widow provides Thurston with her late husband's manuscript which gives the true story of his voyage. He reveals that the uncharted island was a "nightmare corpse-city" called R'lyeh. Johansen's crew struggled to comprehend the non-Euclidean geometry of the city and accidentally released Cthulhu, resulting in their deaths. Johansen and one crewmate fled aboard the Alert pursued by Cthulhu, but they rammed the yacht into the creature's head, only for its injury to regenerate but allowing them to escape. Johansen's crewmate died as did Johansen soon after returning home. After reading the manuscript, Thurston realizes he is now a target of Cthulhu's worshippers, and hopes in vain that his horrible discoveries will never be revealed to the public.

== Inspiration ==
The first seed of the story's first chapter The Horror in Clay came from one of Lovecraft's own dreams in 1919, which he described briefly in letters sent to his friend Rheinhart Kleiner on May 21 and December 14, 1920. In the dream, Lovecraft is visiting an antiquity museum in Providence, attempting to convince the aged curator to buy an odd bas-relief Lovecraft himself had sculpted. The curator initially scoffs at him for trying to sell a recent object to a historical museum. Lovecraft answers:

Why do you say that this thing is new? The dreams of men are older than brooding Egypt or the contemplative Sphinx, or garden-girdled Babylon, and this was fashioned in my dreams.

This can be compared to what the character Wilcox tells narrator's uncle while showing him his sculpted bas-relief for help in reading the hieroglyphs from Wilcox's fantastical dreams:

It is new, indeed, for I made it last night in a dream of strange cities; and dreams are older than brooding Tyre or the contemplative Sphinx, or garden-girdled Babylon.

Lovecraft then used this for a brief synopsis of a new story outlined in his Commonplace Book on August 1925, which developed the idea of the bas-relief and what it might have depicted. In a footnote to his own dream, Lovecraft finished with the suggestion "Add good development & describe nature of bas-relief" to himself for future reference.

S. T. Joshi and David E. Schultz cited other literary inspirations: Guy de Maupassant's "The Horla" (1887), which Lovecraft described in Supernatural Horror in Literature as concerning "an invisible being who...sways the minds of others, and seems to be the vanguard of a horde of extraterrestrial organisms arrived on Earth to subjugate and overwhelm mankind"; and Arthur Machen's "The Novel of the Black Seal" (1895), which uses the same method of piecing together of disassociated knowledge (including a random newspaper clipping) to reveal the survival of a horrific ancient being.

Joshi has also cited A. Merritt's novella The Moon Pool (1918) which Lovecraft "frequently rhapsodied about". Joshi says that "Merritt's mention of a 'moon-door' that, when tilted, leads the characters into a lower region of wonder and horror seems similar to the huge door whose inadvertent opening by the sailors causes Cthulhu to emerge from R'lyeh". It is also assumed he got inspiration from William Scott-Elliot's The Story of Atlantis (1896) and The Lost Lemuria (1904), which Lovecraft read in 1926 shortly before he started to work on the story.

Cthulhu Mythos scholar Robert M. Price claims the irregular sonnet "The Kraken", published in 1830 by Alfred Tennyson, was a major inspiration, since both reference a huge aquatic creature sleeping for an eternity at the bottom of the ocean and destined to emerge from its slumber in an apocalyptic age.

Price also notes that Lovecraft admired the work of Lord Dunsany, who wrote The Gods of Pegana (1905), depicting a god constantly lulled to sleep to avoid the consequences of its reawakening. Another Dunsany work cited by Price is A Shop in Go-by Street (1919), which stated "the heaven of the gods who sleep", and "unhappy are they that hear some old god speak while he sleeps being still deep in slumber".

Edward Guimont has argued that H. G. Wells' The War of the Worlds was an influence on "The Call of Cthulhu", citing the thematic similarities of ancient, powerful, but indifferent aliens associated with deities; physical similarities between Cthulhu and the Martians; and the plot detail of a ship ramming an alien in a temporarily successful but ultimately futile counter-attack.

The "slight earthquake" mentioned in the story is likely the 1925 Charlevoix–Kamouraska earthquake.

== Literary significance and reception ==
Lovecraft regarded the short story as "rather middling—not as bad as the worst, but full of cheap and cumbrous touches". Weird Tales editor Farnsworth Wright first rejected the story, and only accepted it after writer Donald Wandrei, a friend of Lovecraft's, falsely claimed that Lovecraft was thinking of submitting it elsewhere.

The published story was regarded by Robert E. Howard (creator of Conan the Barbarian) as "a masterpiece, which I am sure will live as one of the highest achievements of literature.... Mr. Lovecraft holds a unique position in the literary world; he has grasped, to all intents, the worlds outside our paltry ken". Lovecraft scholar Peter Cannon regarded the story as "ambitious and complex...a dense and subtle narrative in which the horror gradually builds to cosmic proportions", adding "one of [Lovecraft's] bleakest fictional expressions of man's insignificant place in the universe".

French novelist Michel Houellebecq, in his book H. P. Lovecraft: Against the World, Against Life, described the story as the first of Lovecraft's "great texts".

Canadian mathematician Benjamin K. Tippett noted that the phenomena described in Johansen's journal may be interpreted as "observable consequences of a localized bubble of spacetime curvature", and proposed a suitable mathematical model.

E. F. Bleiler has referred to "The Call of Cthulhu" as "a fragmented essay with narrative inclusions".

== See also ==
- Cthulhu Mythos
- Cthulhu Mythos in popular culture
