= R'lyeh =

Fictional lost city in "The Call of Cthulhu"

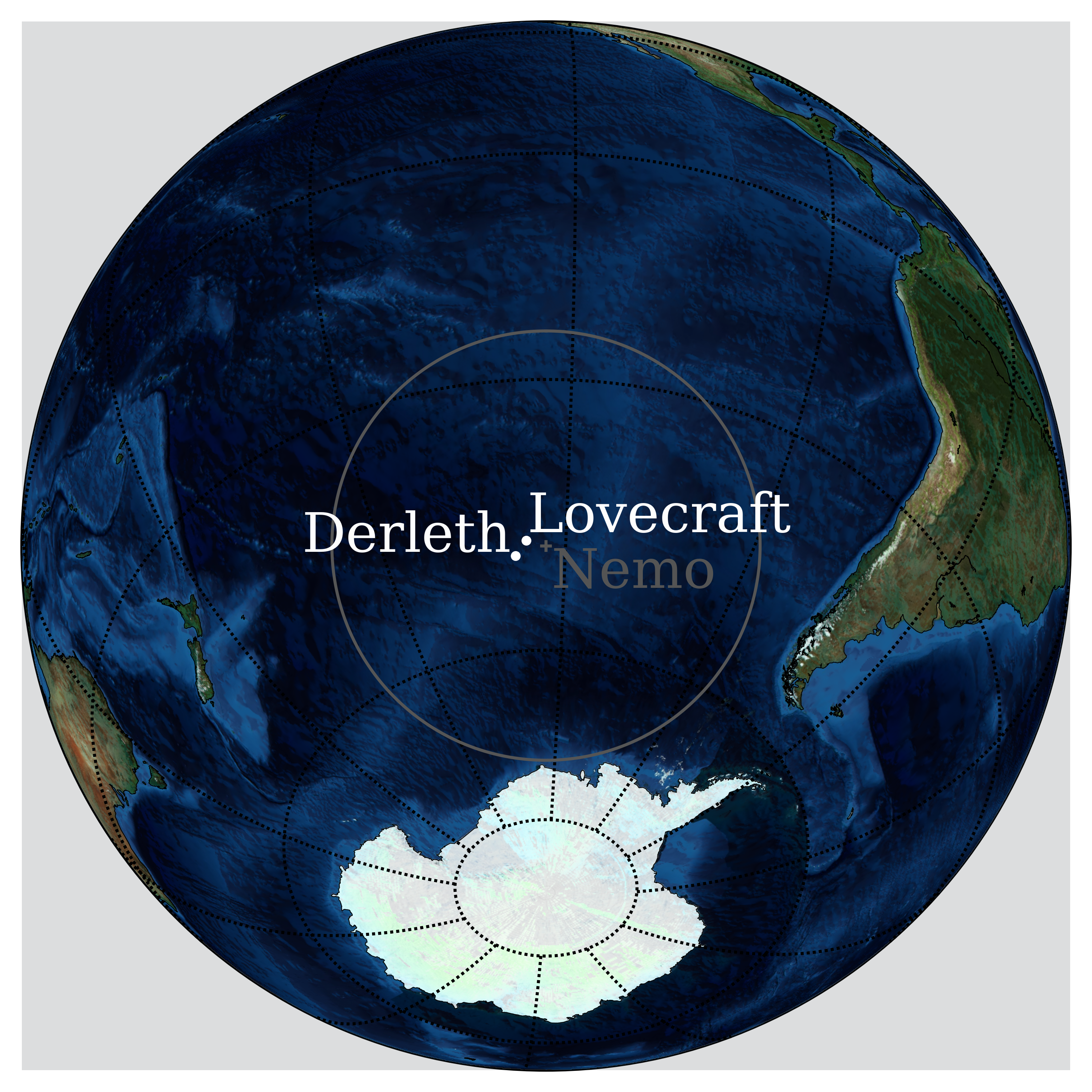
The location of R'lyeh given by Lovecraft was 47°9′S 126°43′W in the southern Pacific Ocean. August Derleth placed it at about 49°51′S 128°34′W. Both locations are close to the Pacific pole of inaccessibility or "Nemo" point, 48°52.6′S 123°23.6′W, a point in the ocean farthest from any land mass.

R'lyeh is a fictional lost city that was first mentioned in the H. P. Lovecraft short story "The Call of Cthulhu", first published in Weird Tales in February 1928. R'lyeh is a sunken city in the South Pacific and the prison of the entity called Cthulhu.

== Description ==
The nightmare corpse-city of R'lyeh...was built in measureless eons behind history by the vast, loathsome shapes that seeped down from the dark stars. There lay great Cthulhu and his hordes, hidden in green slimy vaults.

— H. P. Lovecraft, "The Call of Cthulhu" (1928)

Norwegian sailor Gustaf Johansen, the narrator of one of the tales in the short story, describes the accidental discovery of the city: "a coast-line of mingled mud, ooze, and weedy Cyclopean masonry which can be nothing less than the tangible substance of earth's supreme terror—the nightmare corpse-city of R'lyeh...loathsomely redolent of spheres and dimensions apart from ours". The short story also asserts the premise that while currently trapped in R'lyeh, Cthulhu will eventually return, with worshipers often repeating the phrase Ph'nglui mglw'nafh Cthulhu R'lyeh wgah'nagl fhtagn: "In his house at R'lyeh, dead Cthulhu waits dreaming".

Lovecraft claims R'lyeh is located at 47°9′S 126°43′W in the southern Pacific Ocean. Writer August Derleth, a contemporary correspondent of Lovecraft, placed R'lyeh at about 49°51′S 128°34′W. The latter coordinates place the city approximately 5,100 nautical miles (9,400 km) from the actual island of Pohnpei (Ponape), the location of the fictional "Ponape Scripture". Both locations are close to the Pacific pole of inaccessibility (48°52.6′S 123°23.6′W), the point in the ocean farthest from any land mass.

== Significance and criticism ==
R'lyeh is characterized by bizarre architecture likened to non-Euclidean geometry that hampers exploration and escape. At one point, a crew member "climbed interminably along the grotesque stone moulding – that is, one would call it climbing if the thing was not after all horizontal – and the men wondered how any door in the universe could be so vast" and at another, a sailor "was swallowed up by an angle of masonry which shouldn't have been there; an angle which was acute, but behaved as if it were obtuse". Mathematician Benjamin K. Tippett demonstrates that these observations are consistent with "exploring a bubble of curved spacetime". Non-Euclidean geometry and Einstein's theories feature in several of Lovecraft's stories as Weird elements. Critics Paul Halpern and Michael C. Labossiere note that

Rather than having science expand its boundaries to include genuine supernatural phenomena through brand new theories, the alleged supernatural phenomena are instead accounted for in scientific terms through existing models of nature. Thus, science is not so much embracing the supernatural as reducing it to a manifestation of the natural. Lovecraft's fascinating approach to science and the supernatural is further illustrated by the fact that he reverses the usual technique for ghostly fright. Rather than breaking the laws of science with supernatural means and thus generating fear, he creates a feeling of horror by showing that the common sense views of physics and nature (that is, the old Newtonian views) are the comforting fantasy. In contrast, the counterintuitive "new physics", the true scientific reality, provides the source of horror.

== In popular culture ==
- The main antagonist of the book The City We Became is a shape-shifting entity named after the city of R'lyeh.
- The City of Ry'uul appears in 2025's Doom: The Dark Ages. The city's design features inspiration from Lovecraft, including a fightable creature called "The Old One" that looks like Cthulhu.
