= Necronomicon: The Best Weird Tales of H. P. Lovecraft: Commemorative Edition =

2008 collection of stories by H. P. Lovecraft

Necronomicon: The Best Weird Tales of H.P. Lovecraft: Commemorative Edition
- Cover of the first edition
- Author: H. P. Lovecraft
- Illustrator: Les Edwards
- Language: English
- Genre: Horror short stories
- Publisher: Gollancz
- Publication date: 2008
- Publication place: United Kingdom
- Media type: Print (hardback)
- Pages: 896 pp
- ISBN: 978-0-575-08156-7
- OCLC: 174129973
- Followed by: Eldritch Tales: A Miscellany of the Macabre

Necronomicon: The Best Weird Tales of H.P. Lovecraft: Commemorative Edition is a select collection of horror short stories, novellas and novels written by H. P. Lovecraft. The book was published in 2008 by Gollancz and is edited by Stephen Jones.

== Contents ==
- "Night-Gaunts" (poem)
- "Dagon"
- "The Statement of Randolph Carter"
- "The Doom that Came to Sarnath"
- "The Cats of Ulthar"
- "The Nameless City"
- "Herbert West–Reanimator"
- "The Music of Erich Zann"
- "The Lurking Fear"
- "The Hound"
- "The Rats in the Walls"
- "Under the Pyramids"
- "The Unnamable"
- "In the Vault"
- "The Outsider"
- "The Horror at Red Hook"
- "The Colour Out of Space"
- "Pickman's Model"
- "The Call of Cthulhu"
- "Cool Air"
- "The Shunned House"
- "The Silver Key"
- "The Dunwich Horror"
- "The Whisperer in Darkness"
- "The Strange High House in the Mist"
- "The Dreams in the Witch House"
- "From Beyond"
- "Through the Gates of the Silver Key"
- "At the Mountains of Madness"
- "The Shadow Over Innsmouth"
- "The Shadow Out of Time"
- "The Haunter of the Dark"
- "The Thing on the Doorstep"
- "The Case of Charles Dexter Ward"
- "The Dream-Quest of Unknown Kadath"
- "To a Dreamer" (poem)
- Afterword: A Gentleman of Providence, by Stephen Jones
