= List of horror films of 1992 =

A list of horror films released in 1992.

Title	Director(s)	Cast	Country	Notes	Ref.
Alien 3	David Fincher	Sigourney Weaver, Charles S. Dutton, Charles Dance	United States; United Kingdom		
All Night Long	Katsuya Matsumura	Ryôsuke Suzuki, Yôji Ietomi, Ryōka Yuzuki	Japan		
Amityville 1992: It's About Time	Tony Randel	Stephen Macht, Nita Talbot	United States		
Army of Darkness	Sam Raimi	Bruce Campbell, Embeth Davidtz, Marcus Gilbert	United States	Third film of Evil Dead franchise	
Ax 'Em	Michael Mfume	Michael Mfume, Sandra Pulley, Joe Clair	United States	Alternative title(s): The Weekend It Lives	
Basket Case 3: The Progeny	Frank Henenlotter	Annie Ross, Kevin Van Hentenryck, Dan Biggers	United States	Final film of Basket Case film series	
Battle Girl: The Living Dead in Tokyo Bay	Kazuo Komizu	Toshiya Ito, Devil Masami, Eagle Sawai	Japan		
Braindead (a.k.a. Dead Alive)	Peter Jackson	Timothy Balme, Diana Penalver, Elizabeth Moody	New Zealand	Alternative title(s): Dead Alive	
Bram Stoker's Dracula	Francis Ford Coppola	Gary Oldman, Anthony Hopkins, Winona Ryder, Keanu Reeves	United States		
Buffy the Vampire Slayer	Fran Rubel Kuzui	Kristy Swanson, Donald Sutherland, Luke Perry	United States		
The Burning Moon	Olaf Ittenbach	Andrea Arbter, Kurt Nauder, Barbara Woderschek	Germany		
Candyman	Bernard Rose	Virginia Madsen, Tony Todd, Xander Berkeley	United States	First film of Candyman film series	
Children of the Corn II: The Final Sacrifice	David F. Price	Terence Knox, Paul Scherrer, Ryan Bollman	United States		
Dangerous Seductress	H. Tjut Djalil	Amy Weber, Simon Jonathan Wood, Tonya Lawson	Indonesia; Philippines		
Demonic Toys	Peter Manoogian	Jeff Celentano, Tracy Scoggins, Bentley Mitchum	United States	First film of Demonic Toys film series	
Dr. Giggles	Manny Coto	Larry Drake, Holly Marie Combs, Cliff De Young	United States		
Drillbit	Alex Chandon	Saul Brignell, Lino Raffa, Ben Befell	United Kingdom	Short 33-minute film	
Dust Devil	Richard Stanley	Robert John Burke, Chelsea Field, Zakes Mokae	United Kingdom; United States		
Evil Toons	Fred Olen Ray	David Carradine, Suzanne Ager, Monique Gabrielle, Michelle Bauer, Artie Johnson, Dick Miller	United States	Animated and live action film	
Frankenstein	David Wickes	John Mills, Randy Quaid, Patrick Bergin	United Kingdom	Television film	
Fraternity Demon	C.B. Rubin	Charles Laulette, Michael McKay, Adam Lieberman, Deborah Carlin	United States		
The Gate II: Trespassers	Tibor Takács	Louis Tripp, Simon Reynolds, James Villemaire	Canada	Sequel to The Gate (1987)	
Grave Secrets: The Legacy of Hilltop Drive	John Patterson	Patty Duke, David Selby, David Soul	United States	Television film	
The Guard from Underground	Kiyoshi Kurosawa	Hatsunori Hasegawa, Makiko Kuno, Ren Osugi	Japan		
Guwapings: The First Adventure	Jose Javier Reyes	Mark Anthony Fernandez, Jomari Yllana, Eric Fructuoso, Joey Marquez, Anjo Yllana, Carmina Villarroel, Sunshine Cruz, Eric Cayetano, Abby Viduya	Philippines	Horror-comedy	
Happy Hell Night	Brian Owens	Darren McGavin, Sam Rockwell, Jorja Fox	United States	Alternative title(s): Frat Night	
Hellmaster	Douglas Schulze	David Emge, John Saxon, Jeff Rector	United States		
Hellraiser III: Hell on Earth	Anthony Hickox	Terry Farrell, Doug Bradley, Paula Marshall	United States		
Highway to Hell	Ate de Jong	Chad Lowe, Kristy Swanson, Patrick Bergin	United States		
House IV	Lewis Abernathy	Terri Treas, William Katt, Scott Burkholder	United States	Produced by Sean S. Cunningham	
Innocent Blood	John Landis	Anne Parillaud, David Proval	United States		
Last Dance	Tony Markes	Cynthia Basinet, Elaine Hendrix	United States		
Mad at the Moon	Martin Donovan	Mary Stuart Masterson, Hart Bochner, Fionnula Flanagan	United States	Horror-Western	
Netherworld	David Schmoeller	Michael Bendetti, Denise Gentile, Holly Floria	United States	Produced by Charles Band	
Nightmare Asylum	Todd Sheets	Jenny Admire, Lori Hassel, Veronica Orr	United States	Short 69-minute film	
Pet Sematary Two	Mary Lambert	Edward Furlong, Anthony Edwards, Clancy Brown	United States	Based on a novel by Stephen King	
Poison Ivy	Katt Shea	Sara Gilbert, Tom Skerritt, Cheryl Ladd, Drew Barrymore	United States		
Prom Night IV: Deliver Us from Evil	Clay Borris	Nicole deBoer, Alden Kane, Joy Tanner	United States; Canada		
Raising Cain	Brian De Palma	Lolita Davidovitch, John Lithgow, Steven Bauer, Frances Sternhagen	United States	Produced by Gale Anne Hurd	
Reanimator Academy	Judith Priest	Julian Scott, Sarah Paxton, J. Scott Guy	United States	Low budget film made in Fort Worth, Texas	
Scanners III: The Takeover	Christian Duguay	Steve Parrish, Liliana Komorowska, Valerie Valois	Canada		
Shear Fear	Ilari Nummi	Tiina Tenhunen, Katja Krohn	Finland		
Sleepwalkers	Mick Garris	Brian Krause, Mädchen Amick, Alice Krige	United States		
Spellcaster	Rafal Zielinski	Gail O'Grady, Adam Ant	United States	Produced by Charles Band; Final produced of Empire Entertainment	
Stepfather III	Guy Magar	Robert Wightman, Priscilla Barnes, Season Hubley	United States	Television film	
Tetsuo II: Body Hammer	Shinya Tsukamoto	Tomoroh Taguchi, Shinya Tsukamoto	Japan	Sequel to Tetsuo: The Iron Man (1989)	
Twin Peaks: Fire Walk With Me	David Lynch	David Bowie, Harry Dean Stanton, Kyle MacLachlan, Miguel Ferrer, Heather Graham, Kiefer Sutherland, Jack Nance, Russ Tamblyn	United States	Prequel (and sequel) to the Twin Peaks TV series	
The Unnamable II: The Statement of Randolph Carter	Jean-Paul Ouellette	Mark Kinsey Stephenson, John Rhys-Davies, Julie Strain, David Warner	United States	Based on the works of H. P. Lovecraft	
The Vagrant	Chris Walas	Bill Paxton, Patrika Darbo, Michael Ironside	United States	Produced by Mel Brooks	
Winterbeast	Christopher Thies	Tim R. Morgan, Lissa Breer	United States	Allegedly filmed in 1989	
Witchcraft IV: The Virgin Heart	James Merendino	Charles Solomon Jr., Julie Strain, Jeremy Kasten	United States		
Zipperface	Mansour Pourmand	David Clover, Donna Adams, Jonathan Mandell	United States		

== Sources ==
- Cettl, Robert (2003). Serial Killer Cinema: An Analytical Filmography. Jefferson, North Carolina: McFarland. ISBN 978-0-786-43731-3.
- Hardy, Phil, ed. (1995). The Overlook Film Encyclopedia. Vol. 3. Overlook Press. ISBN 0-87951-624-0.
- Harper, Jim (2004). Legacy of Blood: A Comprehensive Guide to Slasher Movies. Manchester, England: Critical Vision. ISBN 978-1-900-48639-2.
- Muir, John Kenneth (2011). Horror Films of the 1990s. Jefferson, North Carolina: McFarland. ISBN 978-0-786-48480-5.
- Young, R. G. (2000). The Encyclopedia of Fantastic Film: Ali Baba to Zombies. Hal Leonard Corporation. ISBN 1-55783-269-2.
