= List of horror films of 1988 =

A list of horror films released in 1988.

Title	Director(s)	Cast	Country	Notes	Ref.
555	Wally Koz	B.K. Smith, Bob Grabill, Greg Neilson	United States		
American Gothic	John Hough	Rod Steiger, Yvonne De Carlo	United Kingdom; Canada		
Bad Dreams	Andrew Fleming	Jennifer Rubin, Bruce Abbott	United States		
Black Roses	John Fasano	John Martin, Frank Dietz, Jesse D'Angelo	United States; Canada		
The Blob	Chuck Russell	Kevin Dillon, Shawnee Smith	United States		
Blood Relations	Graeme Campbell	Jan Rubeš, Lydie Denier	Canada; United States		
The Brain	Ed Hunt	David Gale, Cynthia Preston	Canada; United States		
Brain Damage	Frank Henenlotter	Rick Hearst	United States		
Cellar Dweller	John Carl Buechler	Yvonne De Carlo	United States		
Cheerleader Camp	John Quinn	Betsy Russell, Leif Garrett, Rebecca Ferratti	United States		
Child's Play	Tom Holland	Brad Dourif, Alex Vincent	United States	First film of Child's Play franchise	
Chillers	Daniel Boyd	Jesse Emery, Kimberly Harbour, Thom Delventhal	United States		
Curse of the Blue Lights	John Henry Johnson	Brent Ritter, Bettina Julius, Clayton A. McCaw	United States		
Dead Heat	Mark Goldblatt	Treat Williams, Joe Piscopo, Lindsay Frost	United States		
Deadly Dreams	Kristine Peterson	Juliette Cummins, Mitchell Anderson, Xander Berkeley	United States		
Destroyer	Robert Kirk	Lyle Alzado, Deborah Foreman, Anthony Perkins	United States		
Dial Help	Ruggero Deodato	Charlotte Lewis, Marcello Modugno, Mattia Sbragia	Italy		
The Discarnates	Nobuhiko Obayashi	Tsurutarō Kataoka, Yûko Natori, Kenjirō Ishimaru	Japan		
Dracula's Widow	Christopher Coppola	Sylvia Kristel, Lenny von Dohlen	United States		
Dream Demon	Harley Cokeliss	Jemma Redgrave, Kathleen Wilhoite, Timothy Spall	United Kingdom		
Edge of the Axe	José Ramón Larraz	Barton Faulks, Christina Marie Lane, Page Moseley	Spain; United States		
Elvira, Mistress of the Dark	James Signorelli	Cassandra Peterson, Edie McClurg	United States		
Evil Clutch	Andrea Marfori	Coralina Cataldi Tassoni, Diego Ribon	Italy		
Evil Dead Trap	Toshiharu Ikeda	Miyuki Ono	Japan		
Evil Laugh	Dominick Brascia	Kim McKamy	United States		
Faceless	Jesús Franco	Helmut Berger, Brigitte Lahaie, Telly Savalas	France; Spain		
Friday the 13th Part VII: The New Blood	John Carl Buechler	Jennifer Banko, Lar Park Lincoln, Kevin Spirtas	United States		
Fright Night Part 2	Tommy Lee Wallace	Roddy McDowall, William Ragsdale	United States		
Ghost Town	Richard McCarthy	Franc Luz, Catherine Hickland, Jimmie F. Skaggs	United States		
Ghosthouse	Umberto Lenzi	Lara Wendel	Italy		
Grandmother's House (a.k.a. Grandma's House)	Peter Rader	Kim Valentine, Eric Foster, Len Lesser	United States		
Graverobbers	Straw Weisman	Elizabeth Mannino, David Gregory, Larry Bockius	United States	Alternative title(s): Dead Mate	
Halloween 4: The Return of Michael Myers	Dwight H. Little	Donald Pleasence, Ellie Cornell, Danielle Harris	United States	Fourth film of Halloween franchise	
Hellbound: Hellraiser II	Tony Randel	Clare Higgins, Ashley Laurence, Richard Waugh	United Kingdom; United States		
Hide and Go Shriek	Skip Schoolnik	Brittain Frye, Donna Baltron	United States		
Hiwaga sa Balete Drive	Peque Gallaga, Lore Reyes	Charito Solis, Gina Alajar, Joel Torre, ZsaZsa Padilla, Jestoni Alaracon, Rita Avila, Michael Locsin, Harlene Bautista, Joed Serrano, Ian Veneracion	Philippines		
Hobgoblins	Rick Sloane	Tamara Clatterbuck, Kari French, Duane Whitaker	United States		
Hollywood Chainsaw Hookers	Fred Olen Ray	Gunnar Hansen, Linnea Quigley, Jay Richardson	United States		
Howling IV: The Original Nightmare	John Hough	Romy Windsor, Michael T. Weiss, Anthony Hamilton	United Kingdom		
Iced	Jeff Kwitny	Debra A. Deliso, Doug Stevenson, Ron Kologie	United States		
Kadaicha	James Bogle	Zoe Carides, Eric Oldfield	Australia	Alternative title(s): Stones of Death	
The Jitters	John Fasano	Sal Viviano, Marilyn Tokuda, James Hong	United States; Japan		
Killer Klowns from Outer Space	Stephen Chiodo	Grant Cramer, Suzanne Snyder, John Allen Nelson	United States		
Killing Birds	Joe D'Amato, Claudio Lattanzi	Robert Vaughn, Lara Wendel	Italy		
The Kiss	Pen Densham	Joanna Pacuła, Meredith Salenger, Mimi Kuzyk	United States		
Lady in White	Frank LaLoggia	Lukas Haas, Alex Rocco, Katherine Helmond	United States		
The Lair of the White Worm	Ken Russell	Amanda Donohoe, Hugh Grant, Catherine Oxenberg	United Kingdom		
Lone Wolf	John Callas	Luciano Saber, Ann Douglas, Kevin Hart	United States		
Maniac Cop	William Lustig	Tom Atkins, Bruce Campbell	United States	First film of Maniac Cop film series	
Matinee	Richard Martin	Ron White, Gillian Barber, Jeff Schultz	Canada		
Memorial Valley Massacre	Robert C. Hughes	John Kerry, Mark Mears, John Caso, Cameron Mitchell	United States		
Men Behind the Sun	T. F. Mou	Gang Wang, Hsu Gou, Tie Long Jin	Hong Kong		
Midnight Movie Massacre	Mark Stock, Laurence Jacobs	Ann Robinson, Tamara Sue Hill, Jeanne Beachwood	United States		
Monkey Shines	George A. Romero	Jason Beghe, Kate McNeil	United States		
The Moonlight Sonata	Olli Soinio	Tiina Björkman	Finland		
Månguden	Jonas Cornell	Agneta Ekmanner, Heinz Hopf, Tomas Laustiola	Sweden		
Necromancer	Dusty Nelson	Elizabeth Kaitan, Russ Tamblyn, John Tyler	United States		
The Nest	Terence H. Winkless	Robert Lansing, Lisa Langlois	United States		
Night of the Demons	Kevin Tenney	Alvin Alexis, Allison Barron, Amelia Kinkade	United States		
A Nightmare on Elm Street 4: The Dream Master	Renny Harlin	Robert Englund, Lisa Wilcox, Rodney Eastman	United States	Fourth film of A Nightmare on Elm Street franchise	
Not of This Earth	Jim Wynorski	Traci Lords, Ace Mask, Becky LeBeau	United States		
Out of the Body	Brian Trenchard-Smith	Mark Hembrow, Tessa Humphries	Australia		
Out of the Dark	Michael Schroeder	Karen Witter, Lynn Danielson-Rosenthal, Karen Black	United States		
Phantasm II	Don Coscarelli	James LeGros, Reggie Bannister	United States	Second film of Phantasm film series	
Phantom Brother	William Szarka	Jon Hammer, Patrick Molloy	United States		
Pin	Sandor Stern	David Hewlett, Cynthia Preston, Terry O'Quinn	Canada		
Poltergeist III	Gary Sherman	Tom Skerritt, Nancy Allen, Heather O'Rourke	United States		
Pulse	Paul Golding	Cliff De Young, Roxanne Hart, Joey Lawrence	United States		
Pumpkinhead	Stan Winston	Lance Henriksen, Florence Schauffler, Jeff East	United States	First film of Pumpkinhead film series	
Rabid Grannies	Emmanuel Kervyn	Caroline Braeckman, Elie Lison, Catherine Aymerie	Belgium; France; Netherlands		
Ratman	Giuliano Carnimeo	Nelson de la Rosa, Werner Pochath, David Warbeck	Italy		
Return of the Living Dead Part II	Ken Wiederhorn	James Karen, Thom Matthews, Michael Kenworthy	United States		
Rush Week	Robert Bralver	Pamela Ludwig, Dean Hamilton, Roy Thinnes	United States		
Scarecrows	William Wesley	Mike Balog, David Campbell	United States		
The Serpent and the Rainbow	Wes Craven	Bill Pullman, Cathy Tyson, Zakes Mokae	United States		
Sleepaway Camp II: Unhappy Campers	Michael A. Simpson	Pamela Springsteen, Brian Patrick Clarke, Renée Estevez	United States		
Slime City	Greg Lamberson	T.J. Merrick, Bunny Levine, Dick Biel	United States		
Slugs	Juan Piquer Simón	Michael Garfield	Spain; United States		
Sorority Babes in the Slimeball Bowl-O-Rama	David DeCoteau	Andras Jones, Robin Stille, Linnea Quigley	United States		
Tales from the Gimli Hospital	Guy Maddin	Kyle McCulloch, Michael Gottli, Angela Heck	Canada		
The Spider Labyrinth	Gianfranco Giagni	Roland Wybenga, Paola Rinaldi, Margareta von Krauss	Italy		
Tiyanak	Peque Gallaga	Janice de Belen, Lotlot De Leon, Ramon Christopher, Mary Walter, Chuckie Dreyfus, Carmina Villarroel, Rudolf Yaptinchay, Smokey Manaloto, Zorayda Sanchez, Bella Flores	Philippines		
The Unholy	Camilo Vila	Ben Cross, Ned Beatty, Claudia Robinson	United States		
Uninvited	Greydon Clark	Alex Cord, George Kennedy, Shari Shattuck	United States		
Unmasked Part 25	Anders Palm	Edward Brayshaw, Gary Brown, Gregory Cox	United Kingdom		
The Unnamable	Jean-Paul Ouellette	Charles Klausmeyer, Mark Kinsey Stephenson, Alexandra Durrell	United States		
Until Death	Lamberto Bava	Urbano Barberini, David Brandon	Italy	Television film	
Vampire in Venice	Augusto Caminito, Klaus Kinski	Klaus Kinski, Barbara De Rossi, Donald Pleasence	Italy		
Veerana	Shyam Ramsay, Tulsi Ramsay	Gulshan Grover, Sahila Chaddha, Hemant Birje	India		
Watchers	Jon D. Hess	Corey Haim, Barbara Williams, Michael Ironside	Canada; United States		
Waxwork	Anthony Hickox	Zach Galligan, Deborah Foreman, David Warner	United States		
Witchcraft	Rob Spera	Anat Topol, Gary Sloan, Mary Shelley, Lee Kissman	United States		
Witchery	Fabrizio Laurenti	David Hasselhoff, Linda Blair, Catherine Hickland	Italy		
Woodchipper Massacre	Jon McBride	Jon McBride, Denice Edeal	United States		
Zombi 3	Lucio Fulci, Bruno Mattei	Marina Loi, Alex Mc Bride, Richard Raymond	Italy		

== Sources ==
- Albright, Brian (2012). Regional Horror Films, 1958-1990: A State-by-State Guide with Interviews. Jefferson, North Carolina: McFarland. ISBN 978-1-476-60042-0.
- Armstrong, Kent Byron (2003). Slasher Films: An International Filmography, 1960 Through 2001. Jefferson, North Carolina: McFarland. ISBN 978-0-786-41462-8.
- Curti, Roberto (2019). Italian Gothic Horror Films, 1980-1989. Jefferson, North Carolina: McFarland. ISBN 978-1-4766-7243-4.
- Dendle, Peter (2010). The Zombie Movie Encyclopedia. Jefferson, North Carolina: McFarland. ISBN 978-0-7864-9288-6.
- Hallenbeck, Bruce G. (2009). Comedy-Horror Films: A Chronological History, 1914-2008. Jefferson, North Carolina: McFarland. ISBN 978-0-786-45520-1.
- Hardy, Phil, ed. (1995). The Overlook Film Encyclopedia. Vol. 3. Overlook Press. ISBN 0-87951-624-0.
- Heller-Nicholas, Alexandra (2011). Rape-Revenge Films: A Critical Study. Jefferson, North Carolina: McFarland. ISBN 978-0-7864-4961-3.
- Joshi, S. T. (2007). Icons of Horror and the Supernatural: An Encyclopedia of Our Worst Nightmares. Vol. 2. Westport, Connecticut: Greenwood Publishing Group. ISBN 978-0-313-33782-6.
- Kerekes, David; Slater, David (2005). See No Evil: Banned Films and Video Controversy. London, England: Headpress. ISBN 978-1-900-48610-1.
- Lentz, Harris M. III (1994). Science Fiction, Horror & Fantasy Film and Television Credits, Supplement 2: Through 1993. McFarland & Company. p. 453. ISBN 978-0-89950-927-3.
- Mazur, Eric (2011). Encyclopedia of Religion and Film. Santa Barbara, California: ABC-CLIO. ISBN 978-0-313-33072-8.
- Muir, John Kenneth (2010). Horror Films of the 1980s. Jefferson, North Carolina: McFarland. ISBN 978-0-786-45501-0.
- Pratley, Gerald (2003). A Century of Canadian Cinema: Gerald Pratley's Feature Film Guide, 1900 to the Present. Toronto, Ontario: Lynx Images. ISBN 978-1-894-07321-9.
- Shelley, Peter (2012). Australian Horror Films, 1973-2010. Jefferson, North Carolina: McFarland. ISBN 978-0-786-46167-7.
- Stine, Scott Aaron (2003). The Gorehound's Guide to Splatter Films of the 1980s. Jefferson, North Carolina: McFarland. ISBN 978-1-476-61132-7.
- Warren, Bill (2001) [2000]. The Evil Dead Companion. New York City, New York: St. Martin's Griffin. ISBN 0-312-27501-3.
- Warren, Wheeler Winston (2010). A History of Horror. Rutgers, New Jersey: Rutgers University Press. ISBN 978-0-8135-4796-1.
- Weldon, Michael (1996). The Psychotronic Video Guide To Film. New York City, New York: Macmillan. ISBN 978-0-312-13149-4.
- Young, R. G. (2000). The Encyclopedia of Fantastic Film: Ali Baba to Zombies. Hal Leonard Corporation. ISBN 1-55783-269-2.
