= A Shoggoth on the Roof =

- Music: He Who (for legal reasons) Must Not Be Named
- Lyrics: He Who (for legal reasons) Must Not Be Named
- Book: See text
- Setting: Arkham, Massachusetts, United States
- Basis: Fiddler on the Roof
- Premiere: 2005: Teater Tentakel, Stockholm
- Productions: 2007: Trinity Gamers, Dublin

A Shoggoth on the Roof is a parody of the 1964 musical Fiddler on the Roof based on the works of H. P. Lovecraft. Published by the H. P. Lovecraft Historical Society, it is credited to a member of the society who is referred to only as "He Who (for legal reasons) Must Not Be Named".

In a fictional backstory created by the H. P. Lovecraft Historical Society, A Shoggoth on the Roof was originally attempted by The Other Gods Theatre Company in 1979 in Los Angeles. The production was abandoned for reasons that are not entirely clear. The H. P. Lovecraft Historical Society have a mockumentary of this production on their website.

The musical makes use of Fiddler on the Roof's original score. As a result, attempts to stage A Shoggoth on the Roof are open to legal challenges and hence rare.

== Story ==
The "Tevye" of this parody is Professor Henry Armitage, the librarian at the fictional Miskatonic University. It is set in 1920s America.

The action is set in the fictional town of Arkham, Massachusetts. The action opens in a manner reminiscent of Fiddler, with a shoggoth on the roof of the Miskatonic library building. Armitage addresses the audience, speaking of all the strange things in Arkham and its horrific history. He then explains how a shoggoth can stay up on "such a pointed roof": Tentacles! ("Tentacles")

Back at Armitage's house, his three daughters, Prudence, Asenath and Jill, along with their mother Marion, are cleaning. The three daughters begin chatting and Prudence reveals that she has fallen in love with Herbert West, a doctor and assistant professor at the university. Meanwhile, Armitage arrives home, and he and Marion discuss finding a suitable husband for Prudence. Marion suggests Wilbur Whately, and Armitage agrees to ask him to lunch. ("Arkham, Dunwich") Prudence hears this and rushes off to see Herbert.

The action then moves to a graveyard, where Randolph Carter and Harley Warren are discussing how best to enter an ancient tomb. A ghoul spies on them as they break in.

Prudence and Herbert meet outside the library, and she confides in him about her parents' plans. He exclaims that he "needs her too much", and will ask her father for her hand in marriage.

Later that night, Jill and Asenath sneak out to visit the library, and it is revealed that Asenath has plans to summon an incubus. They take the Book of Eibon from the library and summon a byakhee. ("Byakhee, Byakhee") However, the creature frightens them and they run away.

Meanwhile, Carter and Warren are opening the tomb, and Warren arranges to go down and relay information to Carter via the telephone equipment they have. He then seems nervous of actually entering the tomb, so Carter pushes him in.

In a scene that appears to take place a few days later, Jill and Asenath attend a ceremony at the Esoteric Order of Dagon. The head cultist intones a prayer to Cthulhu and sacrifices a victim. ("Shoggoth Prayer") Asenath seems attracted to the cultist, and asks Jill to follow her down to the beach to watch him. Jill, however, decides to stay, and watches Obed Marsh, a decrepit old man, clean up the hall. He sings to himself, wishing he were a Deep One. ("If I Were a Deep One") Jill then comes out from her hiding place and chats to him. He is attracted to her, but Jill plays hard to get, going to join her sister.

A few days later, Armitage encounters Wilbur Whately at the library, and asks him to go on a date with Prudence. Wilbur accepts. ("Arkham, Dunwich - reprise") After Wilbur leaves, however, Prudence and Herbert West come to see Armitage, and Herbert asks his permission to marry her. He explains to Armitage about his "great work", the reanimation of dead tissue. ("To Life") Overwhelmed, Armitage gives his consent.

The action then returns to Carter and Warren. Carter is being chased by a ghoul, while Warren discovers the tomb is actually empty, except for an inscription saying "Asenath was here". They decide to head home, but encounter Armitage on the way, who is being attacked by ghouls on his way home. Carter and Warren fight them off, but Armitage is still worried about how to break the news of Herbert and Prudence's marriage to his wife. A chance remark by Carter gives him the idea to tell his wife about a nightmare to get her consent.

That night, Armitage and his wife are in bed, when Armitage starts screaming and tells his wife about a nightmare he had, featuring her Grandma Prudence and Lavinia Whately, saying that Prudence should marry Herbert West. ("The Nightmare") Marion is impressed by this and agrees to marry Prudence to Herbert.

The next day, Jill goes to visit Marsh in his shack. The two of them talk about the Deep Ones, and they end up staring into each other's eyes. Meanwhile, Asenath finally talks to the head cultist at the beach, and he confesses he has fallen in love with her. ("Victim of Victims") They agree to ask Armitage's permission to marry.

Obed Marsh and Jill ask Armitage for his blessing for them to marry, explaining that they have fallen in love. Armitage is horrified at the concept, but Jill explains her feelings ("Very Far From the Home I Love"). Armitage eventually gives them his blessing. Asenath and the head cultist then come to ask his blessing. However, Armitage has a violent prejudice against the cultists and refuses absolutely.

The scene then changes to Prudence and Herbert's wedding, with almost everyone in the town present. Carter and Warren turn up, and head to the buffet table. Asenath and the head cultist then turn up, and they try to explain to Armitage how they are part of the same community. ("Arkham, Dunwich - second reprise") The song is interrupted by Wilbur Whateley, who is enraged at both being denied Prudence and at not being invited to the wedding. He vows revenge, and reads an incantation from the Necronomicon to summon Cthulhu, who appears behind the library and crushes many of the villagers. He then eats Wilbur, and demands to know what is going on. ("Do You Fear Me?") Cthulhu goes on a rampage, destroying the university and killing the entire cast. He then departs, and Herbert West uses his reanimating formula to return himself to life, as well as the rest of the cast. They discuss what to do, now that the Great Old Ones have returned. Armitage explains that no matter what the Old Ones do, they cannot kill knowledge, and that knowledge is the only weapon against them. ("Miskatonic")

== Songs ==
(As they are listed on the original cast recording)

- "Tentacles" (7:04) ("Prologue: Tradition")
- "Arkham, Dunwich" (3:32) ("Sunrise, Sunset")
- "Byakhee Byakhee" (3:46) ("Matchmaker")
- "Shoggoth Prayer" (1:54) ("Sabbath Prayer")
- "If I Were a Deep One" (4:30) ("If I Were a Rich Man")
- "To Life" (3:35) ("To Life")
- "The Nightmare" (7:19) ("Tevye's Dream")
- "Victim of Victims" (1:57) ("Miracle of Miracles")
- "Very Far From The Home I Love" (2:09) ("Far From the Home I Love")
- "Do You Fear Me?" (2:46) ("Do You Love Me?")
- "Miskatonic" (2:47) ("Anatevka")

== Productions ==
The musical makes use of Fiddler on the Roof's original score, which has led to legal challenges to attempts to stage A Shoggoth on the Roof. In 2002 Chicago's Defiant Theatre considered a production, but cancelled the plans after being threatened with litigation. Performances have also been contemplated, attempted and/or abandoned at New York University's Tisch School of the Arts, Brandeis University, University of Calgary, Harvard, Stanford, St. John's College.

The musical was staged for the first time, in a Swedish translation, at Miskatonicon, an H. P. Lovecraft convention in Sweden, on November 4, 2005. The first English-language production was staged at the Leprecon gaming convention in Ireland on February 23, 2007. The production was organised by the Trinity College Dublin Gamers Society. They avoided the legal issues by using a completely new score written for the musical by Aidan Marsh.

The 2014 GothCon in Gothenburg, Sweden, included three performances by ShogGoth.

== Lovecraftian references ==
- Dr. Armitage and the Whateley family are characters from the Lovecraft short story "The Dunwich Horror".
- Herbert West is the title character of the Lovecraft short story "Herbert West–Reanimator". His victim, Dr. Halsey, is also a character from this story.
- Obed Marsh, the Esoteric Order of Dagon, and the Deep Ones are central to the plot of the Lovecraft novella The Shadow over Innsmouth.
- Randolph Carter is featured in a number of stories by Lovecraft, while Harley Warren's adventure into the tomb forms the plot of the story "The Statement of Randolph Carter".
- Asenath shares her given name with Asenath Waite, one of the principal characters of the Lovecraft short story "The Thing on the Doorstep".
- The Necronomicon and the Book of Eibon are referenced in numerous Cthulhu Mythos stories.
- Cthulhu debuts in "The Call of Cthulhu". He is later mentioned in other stories by Lovecraft and other writers, ultimately becoming extremely popular and synonymous with the Mythos.
- Shoggoths play a major role in the novella At the Mountains of Madness, they are also mentioned in The Shadow over Innsmouth.
- The ghouls are central to the plot of the short story "Pickman's Model". They also appear in the novella The Dream-Quest of Unknown Kadath, where they interact with Randolph Carter.
- "Byakhee" is the name given by August Derleth to the creature described in Lovecraft's short story "The Festival".
- Before Jill and Asenath decide to summon a byakhee, they briefly ponder summoning three other creatures: a dimensional shambler (from the short story "The Horror in the Museum"), a hunting horror, and a nightgaunt (the latter two beings appear in the novella The Dream-Quest of Unknown Kadath).
