= Harley Warren =

Fictional character in H.P. Lovecraft stories

Harley Warren is a fictional character created by H. P. Lovecraft, based on his friend Samuel Loveman (1887–1976). Lovecraft had a dream about Loveman, which inspired him to write the short story "The Statement of Randolph Carter" in 1919. In the story, Warren is a mysterious occultist and friend of Carter (Lovecraft's alter ego), who suffers a gruesome but undefined fate while exploring a crypt in Big Cypress Swamp.

Lovecraft mentions Warren in two other short stories. In "The Silver Key", which he wrote in 1926, he describes Harley Warren as "a man in the south, who was shunned and feared for the blaspemous [sic] things he read in prehistoric books and clay tablets smuggled from India and Arabia". The story's sequel, "Through the Gates of the Silver Key", presents Warren as an expert linguist who has mastered the primal Naacal language of the Himalayas. Lovecraft cowrote this latter work with E. Hoffmann Price; they collaborated on the piece from October 1932 to April 1933.

What singles out Warren from Lovecraft's many other doomed characters is his self-sacrificial, gentle nature (he pleads with Carter to put back the crypt's slab and flee while he still has a chance to get away), combined with a sinister element that is more in keeping with Lovecraft's other ambiguous anti-heroes such as Richard Upton Pickman and Herbert West (Carter describes Warren's expression as "disquieting" when he talks about his occult theories).

In a letter to Clark Ashton Smith, Lovecraft proposes that Warren may have been destroyed by a "begetting entity" in Smith's tale "The Nameless Offspring".

A character who bears a resemblance to Warren is Clark Ashton Smith's antehuman sorcerer Haon-Dor (from "The Seven Geases"), another seeker after forbidden lore. Warren is also mentioned in Brian Lumley's Titus Crow series as a member of a Bostonian group of psychics.

== Interpretation ==
In Lovecraft: Disturbing the Universe, Donald R. Burleson says, "The surname Warren suggests, directly, the noun warren, an overcrowded dwelling place, from the Indo-European root wer-, "to cover," whence also comes warrant. Harley Warren is a semantically crowded repository of textuality, dwelling as he does in absence, and warranting, thereby, the existence of the text — not to mention accounting for the fact that a warrant seems to have gone out at some point to have Carter brought in for questioning. Warren's name also suggests warring, and one thinks of critic Barbara Johnson's celebrated and felicitous definition of deconstruction (in The Critical Difference) as "the careful teasing out of warring forces of signification within the text itself." Harley Warren, then, comes to represent — rather, he stays away to represent — the text's own self-differing inclination, the unstoppable "warring" of its significations, the competing of its various possible configurations of privilege. Warren, the deposition tells us, has learned to read a wide variety of languages, and thus he is a fitting figure to represent linguistic and textual complexities."

== In other media ==
Several actors in cinematic renditions of "The Statement of Randolph Carter" have portrayed Harley Warren, including John Rhys-Davies in the 1992 film The Unnamable II: The Statement of Randolph Carter.
