= The Unnamable =

The Unnamable may refer to:

- The Unnamable (novel), a 1953 novel by Samuel Beckett
- "The Unnamable" (short story), by H. P. Lovecraft
- The Unnamable (film), a 1988 film based on the H. P. Lovecraft short story
