= Hypnos (short story) =

1923 short story by H. P. Lovecraft

- Short story by H. P. Lovecraft
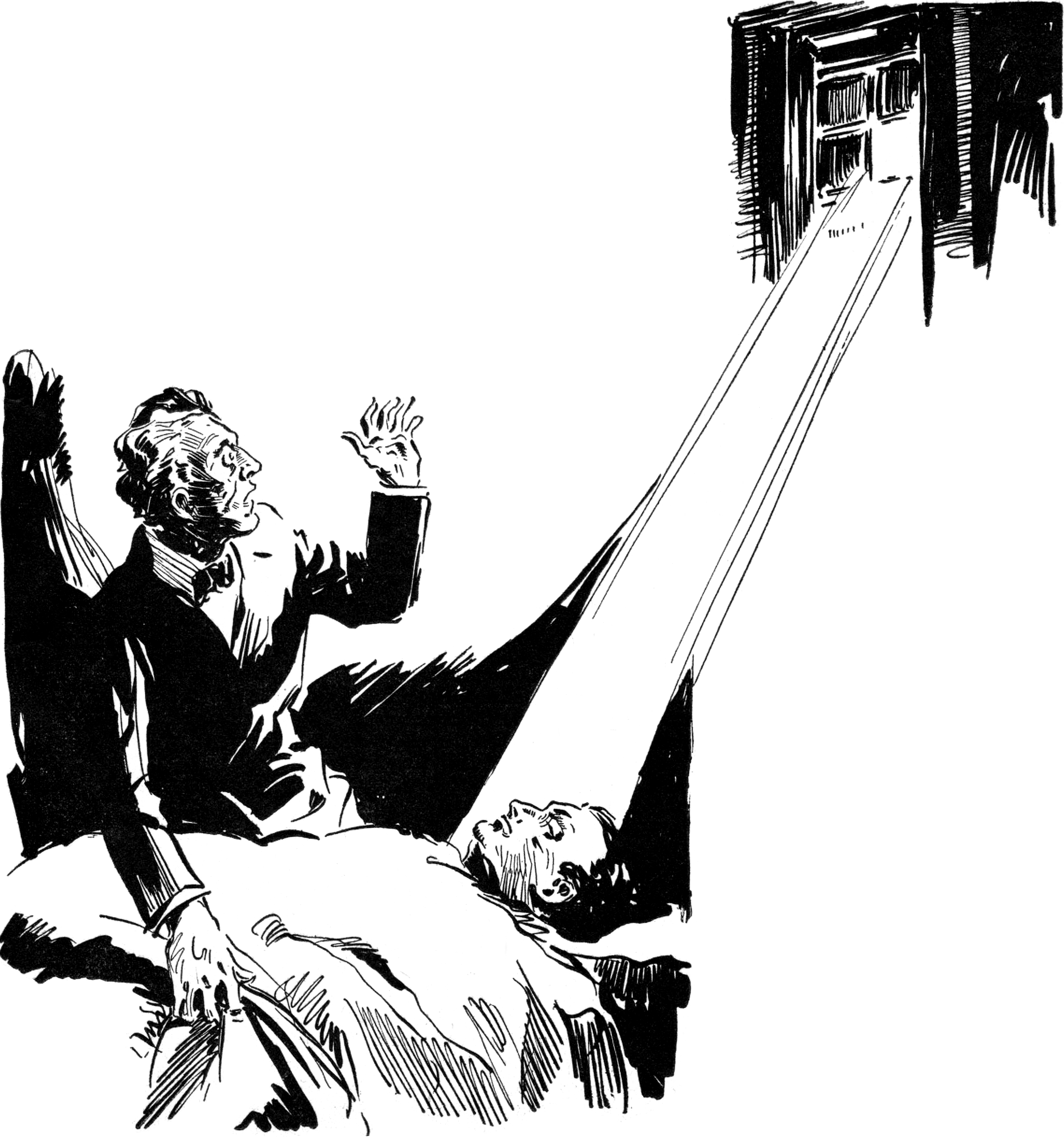

Text available at Wikisource
- Country: United States
- Language: English
- Genre: Horror short story

Publication
- Published in: The National Amateur
- Publication date: May 1923

"Hypnos" is a short story by American horror fiction writer H. P. Lovecraft, penned in March 1922 and first published in the May 1923 issue of National Amateur.

== Plot ==
"Hypnos" is a first-person narrative, written from the perspective of an unnamed character living in Kent and later London, England. The narrator writes that he fears sleep, and is resolved to write his story down lest it drive him further mad, regardless of what people think after reading it.

The narrator, a sculptor, recounts meeting a mysterious man in a railway station. The moment the man opened his "immense, sunken, and widely luminous eyes", the narrator knew that the stranger would become his friend-–"the only friend of one who had never possessed a friend before." In the eyes of the stranger, he witnessed important knowledge of the mysteries he always sought to learn.

From this point on, he would touch his friend and sculpt him daily. At night they would commence their adventures, exploring worlds beyond human comprehension. Over time, the narrator's companion begins to speak of using their ability to transcend into the unknown as a way to rule the universe (via a set of drugs). The narrator is frightened by the prospect and disavows such hubris to the reader.

Soon the narrator is off on a foray with his friend, travelling through a void that he explains is beyond human sensation. Passing through several barriers, eventually the narrator comes to one he cannot cross, though his friend does. Opening his "physical eyes", the narrator wakes up and awaits the return of his friend, who awakes severely shaken and reticent, warning only that they must avoid sleep at all cost.

From then on, with the aid of drugs, the two avoid sleep, as each time they succumb, they both seem to rapidly age and are plagued by nightmares that the narrator refuses to explain. The story ends with the narrator describing how one night his friend fell into a "deep-breathing sleep" and was impossible to arouse. The narrator shrieks, faints, and awakes surrounded by police and neighbors, who inform him that his friend was not real. There is only a bust of his friend in his room, engraved with the Greek word: ΥΠΝΟΣ (Hypnos).

== Significance ==
Lovecraft dedicated this story to his longtime friend Samuel Loveman, who featured in the dreams that inspired Lovecraft's "The Statement of Randolph Carter" and "Nyarlathotep". Loveman suggested it was the best thing Lovecraft had ever written up to that point in time, as mentioned by Lovecraft in a letter.

The plot-germ of the story is found in Lovecraft's commonplace book, in an early entry (#23) reading, "The man who would not sleep—dares not sleep—takes drugs to keep himself awake. Finally falls asleep--& something happens."

As in many of Lovecraft's writings, the terror and the world are unknowable. This fits into Lovecraft's common themes as to the alien and hostile nature of the universe, infinity, and everything. Even at the end of the story, the fate and the narrator's relations themselves are left up to question, again, in keeping with Lovecraft's standard modus operandi.

The story expands upon what has become known as the "Dreamlands", described as lying deeper than matter, time and space and only dreamed about by imaginative men:

Of our studies it is impossible to speak, since they held so slight a connexion with anything of the world as living men conceive it. They were of that vaster and more appalling universe of dim entity and consciousness which lies deeper than matter, time, and space, and whose existence we suspect only in certain forms of sleep—those rare dreams beyond dreams which come never to common men, and but once or twice in the lifetime of imaginative men.

The description of the realms continue on, as being limitless and beyond thought and entity:

There was a night when winds from unknown spaces whirled us irresistibly into limitless vacua beyond all thought and entity. Perceptions of the most maddeningly untransmissible sort thronged upon us; perceptions of infinity which at the time convulsed us with joy, yet which are now partly lost to my memory and partly incapable of presentation to others. Viscous obstacles were clawed through in rapid succession, and at length I felt that we had been borne to realms of greater remoteness than any we had previously known.

== Connections ==
The story ties into other stories by Lovecraft and associated writers:

- The connection between the stars and a person is also featured in Lovecraft's "Beyond the Wall of Sleep" and "Polaris."
- A few of the references to Greek sculpture also appear in his previous story "The Tree."
- The use of a drug to venture through a barrier is also used in Lovecraft's "Ex Oblivione."
- The use of drugs to experience strange worlds (to the detriment of the user) is also featured in Clark Ashton Smith's "Chain of Aforgomon" and Frank Belknap Long's "The Hounds of Tindalos".

== Sources ==
- Lovecraft, Howard P. (2004) [1923]. "Hypnos". In S. T. Joshi (ed.). The Dreams in the Witch House And Other Weird Stories (10th Corrected Printing ed.). London: Penguin Classics. ISBN 0-14-243795-6. Definitive version.
