= The Dream-Quest of Unknown Kadath =

Novella by H. P. Lovecraft

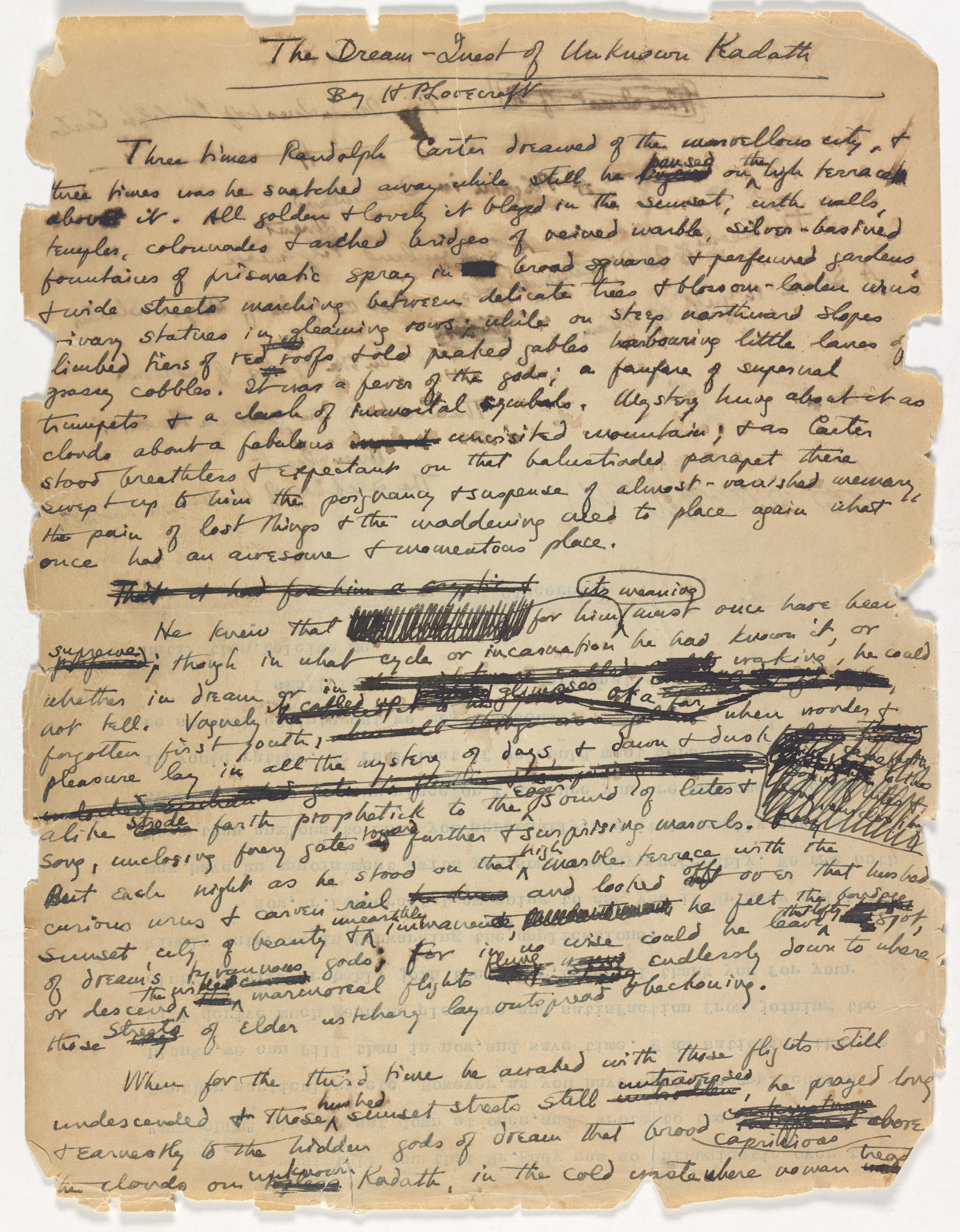
- First page of H. P. Lovecraft's original manuscript to "The Dream-Quest of Unknown Kadath"
- Author: H. P. Lovecraft
- Language: English
- Genre: Horror, fantasy
- Publisher: Arkham House
- Publication date: 1943
- Publication place: United States
- Text: The Dream-Quest of Unknown Kadath at Wikisource

The Dream-Quest of Unknown Kadath is a horror novella by American writer H. P. Lovecraft. Begun probably in the autumn of 1926, the draft was completed on January 22, 1927, and it remained unrevised and unpublished in his lifetime. It is both the longest of the stories that make up his Dream Cycle and the longest Lovecraft work to feature protagonist Randolph Carter. Along with his 1927 novel The Case of Charles Dexter Ward, it can be considered one of the significant achievements of that period of Lovecraft's writing. The Dream-Quest combines elements of horror and fantasy into an epic tale that illustrates the scope and wonder of humankind's ability to dream.

The story was published posthumously by Arkham House in 1943. Currently, it is published by Ballantine Books in an anthology that also includes "The Silver Key" and "Through the Gates of the Silver Key". The definitive version, with corrected text by S. T. Joshi, is published by Arkham House in At the Mountains of Madness and Other Novels and by Penguin Classics in The Dreams in the Witch-House and Other Weird Stories.

== Plot ==
In his dreams, Randolph Carter sees a majestic city, but is unable to approach it. After his third time seeing the city, he prays to the gods of dream to reveal its whereabouts, but then it vanishes from his dreams altogether. Undaunted, Carter resolves to beseech the gods in person at Kadath, the mountain above which the gods of dream live. In dream, Carter consults priests in a temple that borders the Dreamlands. They tell Carter that nobody knows the location of Kadath, and warn him of great danger should he continue with his quest to reach the city, suggesting that the gods had purposefully stopped his visions.

Carter's knowledge of Dreamlands customs and languages makes his quest comparatively less risky than if done by an amateur, but he must consult entities with a dangerous reputation. The Zoogs, a race of predatory rodents, direct him to Ulthar to find the priest Atal. In the cat-laden city of Ulthar, Atal mentions a huge mountainside carving of the gods' features. Carter realizes the gods' mortal descendants will share those features and presumably be near Kadath. While seeking passage there, Carter is kidnapped by turbaned slavers, who take him to the moon and deliver him to horrible moon-beasts, the servants of malevolent god Nyarlathotep. The cats of Ulthar, Carter's allies, rescue him and return him to a port city.

After a long journey, Carter finds the carving, recognizing the visage of the gods in traders who dock at Celephaïs. Before he can act on his knowledge, faceless, winged creatures called nightgaunts capture him and leave him to die in the underworld. Friendly ghouls, including Carter's friend Richard Pickman, assist him in returning to the surface by sneaking through the terrible city of the man-eating Gugs. After assisting the cats in repelling a Zoog sneak attack, Carter buys passage to Celephaïs and learns from the sailors that the traders come from Inganok, a cold and dark land devoid of cats.

Carter meets Celephaïs' king, his friend Kuranes, who became a permanent resident of the Dreamlands upon his death in the waking world. Longing for home, he has dreamed parts of his kingdom to resemble his native Cornwall. Kuranes knows the pitfalls of the Dreamlands well but fails to dissuade Carter from his quest. Under the pretense of wishing to work in its quarries, Carter boards a ship bound for Inganok. As they draw near, Carter spots a nameless island from which he hears strange howls. At a breathtaking summit near a quarry, Carter is captured by a merchant he had previously encountered. Monstrous birds fly them over the Plateau of Leng, a vast tableland populated by Pan-like horned humanoid beings.

Carter is brought to a monastery inhabited by the dreaded High Priest Not to Be Described. There, Carter learns that the Men of Leng are the slavers who captured him, and had worn turbans to conceal their horns. He also learns that the nightgaunts do not serve Nyarlathotep, as is commonly supposed, but Nodens, and that even Earth's gods fear them. Carter recoils in horror as he realizes the masked high-priest's true identity. Carter flees through maze-like corridors, wandering through the monastery in pitch-black darkness until he chances on the exit.

After rescuing several ghouls from the Men of Leng, Carter and the ghoul reinforcements attack a moon-beast outpost on the nameless rock. In a nearby city, Carter obtains the services of a flock of nightgaunts to transport himself and the ghouls to the gods' castle on Kadath. After a long flight, Carter arrives at Kadath but finds it empty. A great procession led by a pharaoh-like man arrives. The pharaoh reveals himself as Nyarlathotep and tells Carter that the city of his dreams is the childhood memories of his home city of Boston. The gods of earth have seen the city of Carter's dreams and made it their home, abandoning Kadath and their responsibilities.

Impressed with Carter's resolve, Nyarlathotep grants Carter passage to the city to recall the gods of earth, but Carter realizes too late that the mocking Nyarlathotep has tricked him and that Nyarlathotep's directions have led him not to the city but to the court of Azathoth at the center of the universe. At first believing he is doomed, Carter suddenly remembers that he is in a dream and wakes. Nyarlathotep broods over his defeat within the halls of Kadath, mocking in anger the "mild gods of earth" whom he has snatched back from the sunset city.

== Characters ==
Lovecraft included elements and characters from previous stories, many of which had been influenced by Lord Dunsany, in Dream-Quest of Unknown Kadath, though they are not always depicted consistently.

- Randolph Carter has the ability to enter the Dreamlands, an alternate dimension accessible through dreams. He appears in several other Lovecraft stories: "The Statement of Randolph Carter", "The Unnamable", "The Silver Key", and "Through the Gates of the Silver Key". He is modeled after the author himself and represents his philosophical views.
- Richard Upton Pickman appears as a ghoul. The character first appeared in "Pickman's Model" (1927), in which he was still a living human artist. He is reported to have disappeared with his family's copy of the Necronomicon in 1926 in Lovecraft's short story "History of the Necronomicon".
- The priest Atal appears as a boy and youth in two earlier tales, "The Cats of Ulthar" (1920) and "The Other Gods" (1933), respectively, which fully describe places and events alluded to in The Dream Quest of Unknown Kadath.
- Nyarlathotep, the Crawling Chaos, is frequently mentioned in Lovecraft's Cthulhu Mythos tales, but his appearance here is the only time during which Nyarlathotep interacts meaningfully with any of Lovecraft's human characters. Nyarlathotep also appears in the sonnet cycle Fungi from Yuggoth.
- Nodens (an Elder God) is also described in "The Strange High House in the Mist". Fritz Leiber wrote that the gods in Lovecraft's fiction are typically depicted as "either malevolent or, at best, cruelly indifferent". Nodens is an exception to this, which Leiber says could be an attempt to explain why the more malevolent gods have not overrun humanity.
- Kuranes was introduced in the short story "Celephaïs" (1920), as a person who abandoned his earthly life in favor of the Dreamlands.

== Inspiration ==
Like Lovecraft's novel fragment "Azathoth" (1922, published 1938), The Dream-Quest appears to have been influenced by Vathek, a 1786 novel by William Thomas Beckford that "is similarly an exotic fantasy written without chapter divisions". Critics such as Will Murray and David E. Schultz, in fact, have suggested that The Dream-Quest is in effect a second attempt at completing the abandoned novel Azathoth.

While the influence of the fantasies of Lord Dunsany on Lovecraft's Dream Cycle is often mentioned, Robert M. Price argues that a more direct model for The Dream-Quest is provided by the six Mars ("Barsoom") novels of Edgar Rice Burroughs that had been published by 1927. It has been noted, however, that there is little in common between John Carter, a classic action hero, outstanding warrior and rescuer of princesses, and Randolph Carter, a melancholy figure, quiet and contemplative, who never actually fights any of his enemies, is captured several times, and needs his friends to rescue him again and again. Elsewhere, Price maintains that L. Frank Baum's The Wonderful Wizard of Oz (1900) was also a significant influence on The Dream-Quest, pointing out that in both books the main character chooses in the end to return "home" as the best place to be.

An H. P. Lovecraft Encyclopedia cites Nathaniel Hawthorne's The Marble Faun and "The Great Stone Face" as influences.

== Reception ==
The Dream-Quest has evoked a broad range of reactions, "some HPL enthusiasts finding it almost unreadable and others ... comparing it to the Alice books and the fantasies of George MacDonald." Joanna Russ referred to The Dream-Quest as "charming ... but alas, never rewritten or polished".

Lovecraft himself declared that "it isn't much good; but forms useful practice for later and more authentic attempts in the novel form." He expressed concern while writing it that "Randolph Carter's adventures may have reached the point of palling on the reader; or that the very plethora of weird imagery may have destroyed the power of any one image to produce the desired impression of strangeness."

In 1948, Arthur C. Clarke sent Lord Dunsany a copy of The Arkham Sampler containing part of The Dream-Quest. Dunsany responded: "I see Lovecraft borrowed my style, & I don't grudge it to him".

== Adaptation ==
The story was adapted as an animated feature film in 2003 by director Edward Martin III, and features the voice of The Darkest of the Hillside Thickets' Toren Atkinson as Randolph Carter. The Dream-Quest of Unknown Kadath held its theatrical premiere at that year's H.P. Lovecraft Film Festival.

== Sources ==
- Harms, Daniel (1998). The Encyclopedia Cthulhiana (2nd ed.). Oakland, CA: Chaosium. ISBN 978-1-56882-119-1.
- Lovecraft, Howard P. The Dream-Quest of Unknown Kadath (1926). In S. T. Joshi (ed.). At the Mountains of Madness and Other Novels (7th corrected printing). Sauk City, WI: Arkham House, 1985. ISBN 0-87054-038-6.
- Schweitzer, Darrell, ed. (2001). Discovering H. P. Lovecraft. Holicong, PA: Wildside Press. ISBN 1-58715-470-6.
