= Necronomicon (disambiguation) =

The Necronomicon is a fictional grimoire from the stories of horror writer H. P. Lovecraft.

Necronomicon may also refer to:

== Books and publishing ==
- Necronomicon Press, American small-press publishing house, founded in 1976
- Published works:
  - Simon Necronomicon, 1977 grimoire, and best-known such work avoiding conventions of modern fictional narratives
  - Necronomicon (H. R. Giger), 1977 compendium of images by that Swiss artist
  - Necronomicon: The Best Weird Tales of H. P. Lovecraft: Commemorative Edition, a 2008 anthology published by Gollancz
  - Necronimicon, alternative title of Flemish comic book series de Rode Ridder

== Films and television ==
- Necronomicon (film), a 1993 American horror anthology film
- Necronomicon - Geträumte Sünden, the German-language title of the 1967 film Succubus by Jesús Franco
- Necronomicon Ex-Mortis, a version of Lovecraft's Necronomicon in the Evil Dead movie series
- Mystery of the Necronomicon, a 2001 hentai anime created by Abogato Powers

== Gaming ==
- Necronomicon: The Dawning of Darkness, a 2001 video game for the PC by Wanadoo Edition

== Music ==
- Necronomicon (Nox Arcana album), 2004
- Necronomicon (The Devil'z Rejects album), 2006
- Necronomicon (band) German thrash metal band.

== Events ==
- NecronomiCon Providence, a biannual Lovecraft convention held in Providence, Rhode Island

== See also ==
- Scotichronicon
