= Samuel Loveman =

American poet

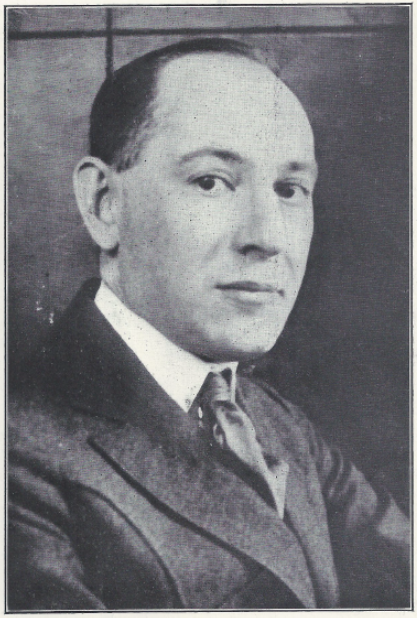
- Samuel Loveman in May 1922
- Born: January 14, 1887; Cleveland, Ohio, US
- Died: May 14, 1976 (aged 89); South Euclid, Ohio, US
- Occupation: Writer

Samuel E. Loveman (January 14, 1887 – May 14, 1976) was an American poet, critic, and dramatist probably best known for his connections with writers H. P. Lovecraft and Hart Crane.

== Early life and career ==
Samuel Loveman lived in Cleveland for the first 37 years of his life. He worked first as a cost accountant. Between 1905 and 1908 he published many poems, and again between 1919 and 1926 in such amateur journals as Clevelander, Cartoons, Sprite, The National Amateur, and The United Amateur.

In 1918 he was drafted and spent the next year and a half at Camp Gordon, Georgia. Bronchial trouble, bad eyesight and heart trouble prevented him from being sent overseas. Upon his return to Cleveland he was unemployed for some years. Around this time he met Hart Crane and became closely associated with the 'Hart Circle'. In the early 1920s he translated Charles Baudelaire and Paul Verlaine from the French, publishing them in his little magazine The Saturnian (June–July [1920]; Aug-Sept [1920]; March 1922). The third issue of this included Loveman's translations from Heinrich Heine (on which he had worked since 1909). He was a self-taught specialist in Elizabethan prose and drama, and Ancient Greek poetry. His own exotic and imaginative verse included The Hermaphrodite (begun Feb 1921; 1926) described as "a long, gorgeously evocative poem that flawlessly recreates the atmosphere of classical antiquity" and The Sphinx (a prose drama begun as early as 1918, finished by around April 1922 and published in 1926 by W. Paul Cook in the second number of his journal The Ghost.). The latter work has been called "a riot of exotic imagery and diction".

Around 1923, Loveman secured employment at Eglin's, a Cleveland bookstore, but lost the position by November that year. He then followed Hart Crane and moved to New York. Crane lived one flight above Loveman in Brooklyn Heights. Loveman and Don Bregenzer assembled an anthology of essays on James Branch Cabell prior to Loveman's departure for New York. He secured employment at Dauber and Pine (booksellers) in New York, a position he retained into the 1930s. Loveman wrote an entire monograph on one of his favourite writers, Edgar Saltus, but it appears not to have survived, though he contributed a brief preface to Poppies and Mandragora (NY: 1926), a collection of poems by Edgar and Marie Saltus.

In 1932 Loveman helped establish the literary magazine Trend and published various poems, essays and reviews there. A significant collection of his verse, The Hermaphrodite and Other Poems finally appeared in 1936.

Loveman made little attempt to preserve or gather his own work during his lifetime, the largest gathering perhaps being that of 23 poems published together in Hyman Bradofsky's The Californian for Summer 1935. A collection of his work, edited by S. T. Joshi and David E. Schultz, was published in 2004 as Out of the Immortal Night: Selected Works of Samuel Loveman. Despite the modest subtitle, this volume contains all Loveman poems previously published in his own collections, together with seventy poems previously uncollected, together with Loveman's fiction, essays and reviews.

His friends included Ambrose Bierce (who made protracted attempts to secure publication for Loveman's poem "In Pierrot's Garden"). Bierce put Loveman in touch with George Sterling, who in turn introduced Loveman to Sterling's protege Clark Ashton Smith. Loveman's poem "Understanding" is dedicated to Smith, and Smith drew a portrait of Loveman which survives. Other friends included Allen Tate, H. P. Lovecraft (he was a member of Lovecraft's literary circle, the Kalem Club) along with Frank Belknap Long, and Hart Crane, with Loveman functioning as executor of Hart Crane's estate.

== Friendship with H. P. Lovecraft ==
H. P. Lovecraft had written the poem "To Samuel Loveman, Esquire, on His Poetry and Drama, Writ in the Elizabethan Style" (Dowdell's Bearcat, Dec 1915). Lovecraft and Loveman began correspondence in 1917. Loveman was close friends with Lovecraft during Lovecraft's New York years (he put Lovecraft in touch with the revision clients Zealia Bishop and Adolphe Danziger de Castro). Lovecraft was hugely impressed by Loveman's personal collection of rare first editions and early books including incunabula. At one point in his career Loveman, low on financial resources, was forced to sell much of this collection.

H. P. Lovecraft's story "The Statement of Randolph Carter" was based on a dream Lovecraft had, which included Loveman; Loveman became Harley Warren in the story. A manuscript of Lovecraft's story "Hypnos" (1922) has recently been discovered with the original header dedication of "To S.L.". Lovecraft's "Nyarlathotep" was also inspired by a dream he had about Loveman.

After Lovecraft's death Loveman wrote two affectionate memoirs, "Howard Phillips Lovecraft" (in Something About Cats and Other Pieces) and "Lovecraft as a Conversationalist" (Fresco, Spring 1958). Loveman later bitterly repudiated the memory of Lovecraft's friendship in an essay titled "Of Gold and Sawdust" when Lovecraft's ex-wife Sonia Greene (also Jewish) told him that Lovecraft was an anti-Semite. Loveman burned all his correspondence from Lovecraft; five letters and two postcards from Loveman to Lovecraft do survive; a few scraps of Loveman's letters to Lovecraft survive because Lovecraft used the versos of them for rough drafts of his stories or essays.

== Later career ==
Loveman wrote numerous memoirs of Hart Crane, and nursed Crane's mother Grace until her death. In the 1940s he established the Bodley Book Shop, a mail order book business in partnership with David Mann in Greenwich Village. He dealt in old books and pre-Columbian antiquities and lived on 52nd Street, across from the popular night club Leon and Eddie's. Under the imprint of the Bodley Press he published three books including Brom Weber's Hart Crane: A Biographical and Critical Study (1948). W. Paul Cook finally issued The Sphinx in a limited edition in 1944. Loveman continued working in the book trade into an advanced age, including such venues as the Gotham Book Mart; he also established his own bookstore, which was discontinued a few years before his death.

Loveman sold many objects relating to literary figures, particularly Hart Crane. Many of these items were forgeries that were made by Loveman himself. This has negatively affected his reputation among book collectors and scholars. In 1961, he sold a purported photograph of Emily Dickinson, to a collector. This resulted in a controversy over the photograph's validity, as Loveman had forged the signature on its reverse. It was determined that the photograph was not authentic in 1993.

He never married. Though he claimed to have been rejected by a woman during a youthful romance, he reportedly lived with a male dancer from the Metropolitan Opera for many years. He left his entire estate to a friend, Ernest Wayne Cunningham. He published no poetry, so far as is known, for the forty years prior to his death. In 1971 he suffered a coronary infarction but recovered. In 1972 he was resident in South Euclid, Ohio. He died in relative obscurity in 1976 at the Jewish Home and Hospital for the Aged.

== Books by Loveman ==
- Poems. Cleveland, 1911. 24-page pamphlet published at the poet's own expense.
- Twenty-One Letters of Ambrose Bierce. Cleveland, 1922. Published by Loveman's Cleveland friend George Kirk. Includes Loveman's poem "In Pierrot's Garden". Limited ed of 1000 copies, 50 signed, on Japanese vellum; 950 on Antique Paper. Reprinted July 1991 – West Warwick, RI: Necronomicon Press, with an introduction "Ambrose Bierce and H.P. Lovecraft" by Donald R. Burleson.
- Loveman and Don Bregenzer (eds). A Round Table in Poictesme. Cleveland: The Colophon Club. Collection of essays on James Branch Cabell
- The Hermaphrodite. Athol, MA: The Recluse Press, 1926. Published by W. Paul Cook.
- The Hermaphrodite and Other Poems. Caldwell, Idaho: Caxton Printers, 1936.
- The Sphinx: A Conversation. Athol, MA: The Recluse Press, 1944. Published by W. Paul Cook.
- Hart Crane: A conversation with Samuel Loveman..Edited by Jay Socin and Kirby Congdon. NY: Interim Books, 1964 (500 copies).
- Out of the Immortal Night: Selected Works of Samuel Loveman. Edited by S. T. Joshi and David E. Schultz. NY: Hippocampus Press, 2004. New, much-expanded edition 2021.
- Born Under Saturn: The Letters of Samuel Loveman and Clark Ashton Smith. (Hippocampus Press). Edited by S. T. Joshi and David E. Schultz. NY: Hippocampus Press, 2021.
