= The Unnamable II: The Statement of Randolph Carter =

- DVD cover
- Directed by: Jean-Paul Ouellette
- Written by: Jean-Paul Ouellette; H. P. Lovecraft (short story)
- Produced by: Jean-Paul Ouellette; Alexandra Durrell
- Starring: Mark Kinsey Stephenson; Charles Klausmeyer; Maria Ford; John Rhys-Davies; Julie Strain
- Cinematography: Greg Gardiner; Roger Olkowski
- Music by: David Bergeaud
- Distributed by: Prism Entertainment Corporation
- Release date: October 21, 1992 (UK video premiere)
- Running time: 104 minutes
- Language: English

The Unnamable II: The Statement of Randolph Carter (a.k.a. The Unnamable Returns) is a 1992 horror film directed Jean-Paul Ouellette. It incorporates elements from the short story "The Statement of Randolph Carter" by H.P. Lovecraft, and is a sequel to The Unnamable, which is loosely based on the short story of the same name, also by Lovecraft.

Mark Kinsey Stephenson reprises the role of Randolph Carter from the previous film, while Charles Clausmeyer also reprises his role as Howard. John Rhys-Davies plays Professor Warren, and David Warner plays the dean of the university.

David Warner is also featured in the film Necronomicon, starring alongside Jeffrey Combs, who plays Lovecraft himself.

== Plot ==
The film opens outside the Winthrop house from the first film, but this time, it swarms with police officers and medical technicians. Howard Damon is being wheeled into an ambulance because he has three deep gashes in his chest, Tanya Heller is put into a police car, and Randolph Carter is carrying Joshua Winthrop's book of spells The Necronomicon, which he gives to Howard for safe keeping. Randolph confronts the Dean of the university about the house, who tells him not to dabble in things that he could never understand. Then Randolph goes to Professor Warren, who agrees to help.

Howard is dragged along, and the three go to the spot where Randolph erupted from the ground in the first film. Howard is to stay near the car to keep guard. Eventually, Warren and Carter find Alyda, Joshua Winthrop's demon daughter (Joshua Winthrop appears to Howard in a dream at some point to confess that he caused his daughter's evilness) wrapped up in the roots of the tree that dragged Alyda out from the house in the first film. Warren injects the monstrous being with insulin to rid her body of the demon. This plan works, and she transforms into a beautiful woman, naked and wrapped in the tree roots. She is given sugar to bring her out of the insulin overdose, and the pair free her from her bonds. The demon is still in the caves, though, and it begins to hunt Alyda down so that they can be one again. After a showdown in the Arkham Library, Randolph manages to defeat the demon, but Alyda dies simultaneously.

== Cast ==
- Mark Kinsey Stephenson as Randolph Carter
- Maria Ford as Alyda Winthrop
- Charles Klausmeyer as Howard Damon
- John Rhys-Davies as Professor Warren
- Julie Strain as the Unnamable
- David Warner as Chancellor Thayer
- Shawn T. Lim as Robert Barger
- Siobhan McCafferty as Officer Debbie Lesh
- Richard Domeier as Officer Malcolm Bainbridge
- Brad Blaisdell as Officer Ben Lesh
- Kevin Alber as Jack Herman

== Critical reaction ==
In their book Lurker in the Lobby: A Guide to the Cinema of H. P. Lovecraft, Andrew Migliore and John Strysik write: "Unfortunately, the sinister grace of Katrin Alexandre's she-demon from the first film is sorely missing. Julie Strain's take on the creature is like herself, bigger and more athletic, and the overall feel is less like Lovecraft and more like a commonplace monster that's escaped from a Brothers Grimm fairy tale. That said, Unnamable II is still a fun ride for anybody who has ever tried smuggling a member of the opposite sex into their dorm room after a long night in a graveyard."
