= Shadow of the Unnamable =

Shadow of the Unnamable is a short film by German director Sascha Alexander Renninger. It is based on H. P. Lovecraft's short story The Unnamable (1923). It had its premiere in 2011 at the H.P. Lovecraft Film Festival in Los Angeles, California, USA. There it won its first award, Best Short Lovecraft Adaptation.

S.T. Joshi, a Lovecraft scholar and bibliographer, said about the film: “Shadow of the Unnamable is a splendid Lovecraftian film. With its convincing period atmosphere, its restrained but powerful special effects, and most of all its hints of cosmic terror, it captures the essence of the Lovecraftian imagination.”

== Awards ==
- Best Sci-Fi / Horror Short, 2013 Berlin Independent Film Festival, Berlin, Germany
- Best International Horror Short, 2012 Buffalo Screams Horror Film Festival, Buffalo, NY, USA
- Best Short Lovecraft Adaptation, 2011 H.P. Lovecraft Film Festival®, Los Angeles, California, USA

=== Nominations ===
- Best International Horror Short, 2012 Buffalo Screams Horror Film Festival, Buffalo, NY, USA
- Best Editing, 2012 Buffalo Screams Horror Film Festival, Buffalo, NY, USA
- Best Special Visual Effects, 2012 Buffalo Screams Horror Film Festival, Buffalo, NY, USA
