= Randolph Carter =

- Dream Cycle character
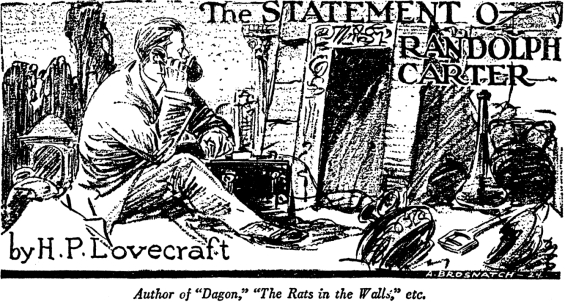
- Illustration by Andrew Brosnatch
- First appearance: "The Statement of Randolph Carter"
- Last appearance: "Out of the Aeons"
- Created by: H. P. Lovecraft
- Portrayed by: Darryl Tyler (1987); Mark Kinsey Stephenson (1988; 1993); Art Kitching (1998); Mad Martian (2005); Daniel Hill (2009); Greig Johnson (2016)
- Voiced by: Bronson Pinchot; Stanley Tucci

In-universe information
- Aliases: Swami Sunand Chandraputra; Zkauba
- Occupation: Writer; Ex-soldier
- Relatives: Ernest K. Aspinwall (distant cousin); Sir Randolph Carter; (ancestor)
- Nationality: American

Randolph Carter is a recurring fictional character created by H. P. Lovecraft. The character first appears in "The Statement of Randolph Carter", a short story Lovecraft wrote in 1919 based on one of his dreams. An American magazine called The Vagrant published the story in May 1920. Carter appears in seven stories written or co-written by Lovecraft, and has since appeared in stories by other authors.

== Appearances in Lovecraft's writing ==
Title	Date Written	Form	Notes
"The Statement of Randolph Carter"	1919	Short story	
"The Unnamable"	1923	Short story	
The Dream-Quest of Unknown Kadath	1926–1927	Novella	
"The Silver Key"	1926	Short story	
The Case of Charles Dexter Ward	1927	Novella	Mentioned only
"Through the Gates of the Silver Key"	1933	Short story	Co-written with E. Hoffmann Price
"Out of the Aeons"	1933	Short story	Co-written with Hazel Heald

== Profile ==
Carter shares many of Lovecraft's personal traits: He is an uncelebrated author whose writings are seldom noticed. A melancholy figure, Carter is a quiet contemplative dreamer with a sensitive disposition, prone to fainting during times of emotional stress. He can also be courageous, with enough strength of mind and character to face and foil the horrific creatures of the Dreamlands, as described in The Dream-Quest of Unknown Kadath.

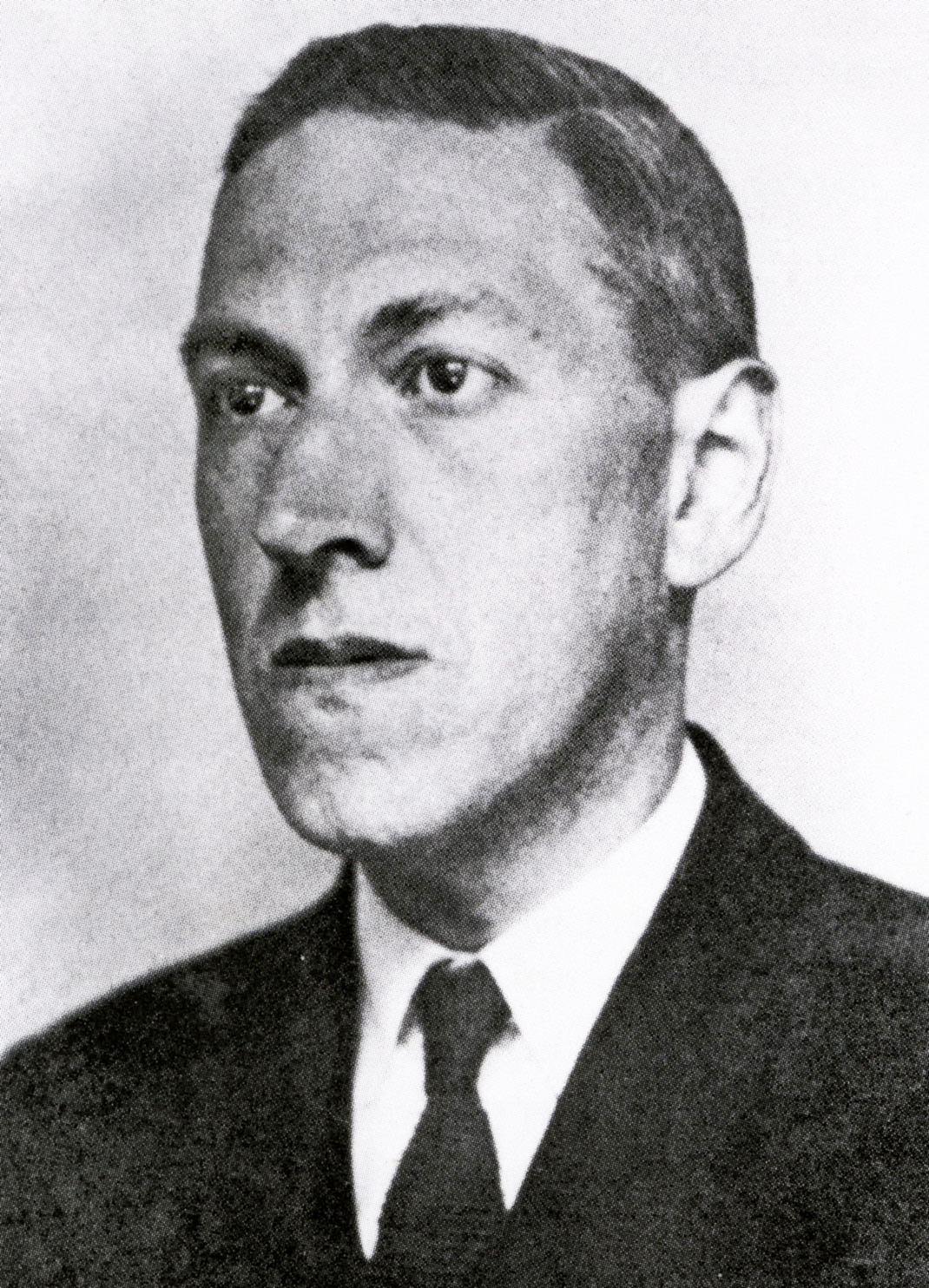
H. P. Lovecraft, the creator of Randolph Carter

He is an antiquarian and one-time student of the fictional Miskatonic University.

He grew up in and around Boston. At the age of nine, he underwent a mysterious experience at his great-uncle Christopher's farm and thereafter exhibited a gift of prophecy. He is the descendant of Sir Randolph Carter, who had studied magic during the reign of Queen Elizabeth I of England. Sir Randolph had then emigrated to America and his son Edmund Carter later had to flee the Salem witch-trials. Carter also had an ancestor involved in one of the Crusades, who was captured by the Muslims and learned "wild secrets" from them.

Carter served in the French Foreign Legion during the First World War, and was badly wounded in fighting near Belloy-en-Santerre in 1916, presumably during the Battle of the Somme in which the Legion participated. Poet Alan Seeger perished there in the Foreign Legion on the first day of the Somme, and Lovecraft may well have had Seeger in mind; Lovecraft penned a poem to Seeger's memory in 1918.

"The Statement of Randolph Carter" is narrated in flashback by Carter while being interrogated by the police, who suspect him of murdering Harley Warren. Carter and his friend Harley Warren investigate a mysterious crypt in an ancient abandoned cemetery. The story was a nearly verbatim recording of one of Lovecraft's nightmares, with but minor changes like the name "Lovecraft" to "Carter".

In "The Unnamable", "Carter" (presumably Randolph Carter) and his friend Joel Manton are attacked by the titular monster in an 18th-century cemetery. Here, "Carter" is not given a first name and described as an author of weird fiction., but an oblique reference to the incident is found in "The Silver Key".

During the course of The Dream-Quest of Unknown Kadath, one of Lovecraft's longest stories, Carter searches for several months for the lost city of his dreams. The story reveals Carter's familiarity with much of Lovecraft's fictional universe. He is also shown to possess considerable knowledge of the politics and geography of the dream world and has allies there. After an elaborate odyssey, Carter awakens in his Boston apartment with only a fleeting impression of the dream world he left behind, though he now knows what the lost city actually is.

The short story "The Silver Key" finds Carter entering middle age and losing his "key to the gate of dreams."

"Through the Gates of the Silver Key," written in collaboration with Lovecraft admirer E. Hoffmann Price, details Carter's adventures in another dimension.The investigation into Carter's disappearance takes place four years later, in 1932.

"Out of the Aeons" by Lovecraft and Hazel Heald (published as a work by Heald alone) features a brief 1931 appearance by Carter, while trapped in the alien body. He visits a museum exhibiting an ancient mummy from a long-forgotten civilization and recognizes some of the writing on the scroll that accompanies it.

== In work by other authors ==
=== Literature ===
- Randolph Carter appears in The Clock of Dreams, one of many Cthulhu Mythos novels by Brian Lumley.
- Gene Wolfe's short story "Game in the Pope's Head" follows a man named Randolph Carter, though his introduction in the book in which the story is published states that it is about Jack the Ripper.
- Carter appears in "Allan and the Sundered Veil", a serialized prose backup in the first six issues of Alan Moore's The League of Extraordinary Gentlemen comic book as well as in "The New Traveller's Almanac". Here he is named as a grand-nephew of Edgar Rice Burroughs' John Carter.
- In Alan Moore's short story "The Courtyard", and its comics adaptation, Randolph Carter is the stage name of the frontwoman and vocalist of the band the Ulthar Cats.
- He is the King of Ilek-Vad and the former lover of the protagonist in Kij Johnson's The Dream-Quest of Vellitt Boe.
- He appears as a wine merchant in "The Winfield Heritance" by Lin Carter, one of Carter's Xothic Legend Cycle.

=== Comics ===
- Randolph Carter appears in the Caliber Comics'The Statement of Randolph Carter by Steven Philip Jones and Christopher Jones.
- Randolph Carter is portrayed as a member of the Miskatonic Project]in the graphic novel, The Miskatonic Project: Bride of Dagon. It is revealed that Carter is the anonymous narrator of Lovecraft's "The Festival".
- In the Oct. 1979 issue of Heavy Metal, Randolph Carter appears in The Thing, a six-page picture version of 'The Statement of Randolph Carter" using the original text.
- In I.N.J. Culbard's Lovecraft, in the story At The Mountains of Madness, the book A War Come Near written by Randolph Carter appears.

=== Parodies ===
- Carter appears three times in the Lovecraft-themed musical parody A Shoggoth on the Roof, including in the opening number.

=== Games ===
- In Chaosium's collectible card game MYTHOS and its MYTHOS: Dreamlands expansion, Randolph Carter appears as an ally card.
- In Lovecraft Letter, a version of Love Letter including special insanity cards, he is the sane version of the "King" card of the original game.
- In Code Name: S.T.E.A.M., Randolph Carter is featured as a member of the S.T.E.A.M. strike force.
- In Persona 2: Eternal Punishment's additional scenario (PSP Remake), Randolph Carter is a character who grants access to Kadath Mandala for the party, requesting that they retrieve the fragment of his soul stolen by Nyarlathotep.
- In Fantasy Flight Games' Dream-Eaters cycle of Arkham Horror: The Card Game, Carter is a recurring NPC that guides the investigators in the waking world.
- One "Gentleman Who Travels Through Time and Space" appears in Fate/Grand Order is heavily implied to be Randolph Carter, citing his ancestry based in Salem, and being knowledgeable about Outer Gods.

=== Film ===
- Carter is the protagonist in the 1988 film The Unnamable, loosely based on the short story. Hs is played by Mark Kinsey Stephenson, who reprised the role in the 1993 sequel, The Unnamable II: The Statement of Randolph Carter. Carter is depicted as an intellectual on a search for adventure, as he appeared in The Dream-Quest of Unknown Kadath and "The Silver Key", rather than "a bag of nerves" as he was described in "The Statement of Randolph Carter".
- Carter is the main character in the movie adaptation of "Cool Air", replacing the unnamed narrator of the original story. He is portrayed by Bryan Moore.

=== Audio ===
- A radio adaptation of "The Statement of Randolph Carter" by Macabre Fantasy Radio Theater was performed live in 2012.
- Randolph Carter was played by Terry Edward Moore in the Imagination Theatre radio series Kincaid, the StrangeSeeker.
- Carter was voiced by Stanley Tucci in the 2020 Audible audio drama Arkham County.

== Chronological appearances ==
This list is based in the An H. P. Lovecraft Encyclopedia.

- The Dream-Quest of Unknown Kadath: here Carter is, presumably, twenty years old. (See The Silver Key section).
- "The Statement of Randolph Carter": here Carter's age is unspecified, but the events are set after The Dream-Quest of Unknown Kadath.
- "The Unnamable": This story occurs not long after The Statement of Randolph Carter.
- "The Silver Key": here Carter is thirty, but is transformed into a nine-year-old boy. Then, at fifty-four, he finds the Silver Key.
- "Through the Gates of the Silver Key" takes place after "The Silver Key".

An H. P. Lovecraft Encyclopedia doesn't mention anything about the chronology of "The Case of Charles Dexter Ward" or "Out of the Aeons". Lovecraft scholar S.T. Joshi used the chronology Lovecraft gives in "The Silver Key" in which the events in "The Statement of Randolph Carter" took place when Carter was in his late forties. Joshi states that it explains why he was called a "bundle of nerves" in that story, as it implies that Carter suffers Post-traumatic stress disorder from the War.
