= Mark Kinsey Stephenson =

American actor

Mark Kinsey Stephenson is an American-born actor known for his portrayal of Randolph Carter in the H.P. Lovecraft film adaptation named The Unnamable and its sequel The Unnamable II: The Statement of Randolph Carter; the latter covered the whole of Lovecraft's story, The Statement of Randolph Carter, in about ten minutes.

Aside from film, Stephenson is also a stage actor and director. In 2008 he performed as Richard Henry Lee in 1776 and in 1996, directed Where Afghans Walk With a Elegance. Other stage performances include The Murphy Stories and Jack and I.

== Filmography ==
- The Unnamable (1988) - Randolph Carter
- Servants of Twilight (1991) - Gunman at House
- The Unnamable II: The Statement of Randolph Carter (1993) - Randolph Carter
- Where Evil Lies (1995) - David
- Domino (2005) - Catholic Teacher
- Night of the Templar (2009) - Limo Driver

=== As writer ===
- Someone Is Watching (2000)
