= Pickman's Model =

1927 short story by H. P. Lovecraft

- Short story by H. P. Lovecraft
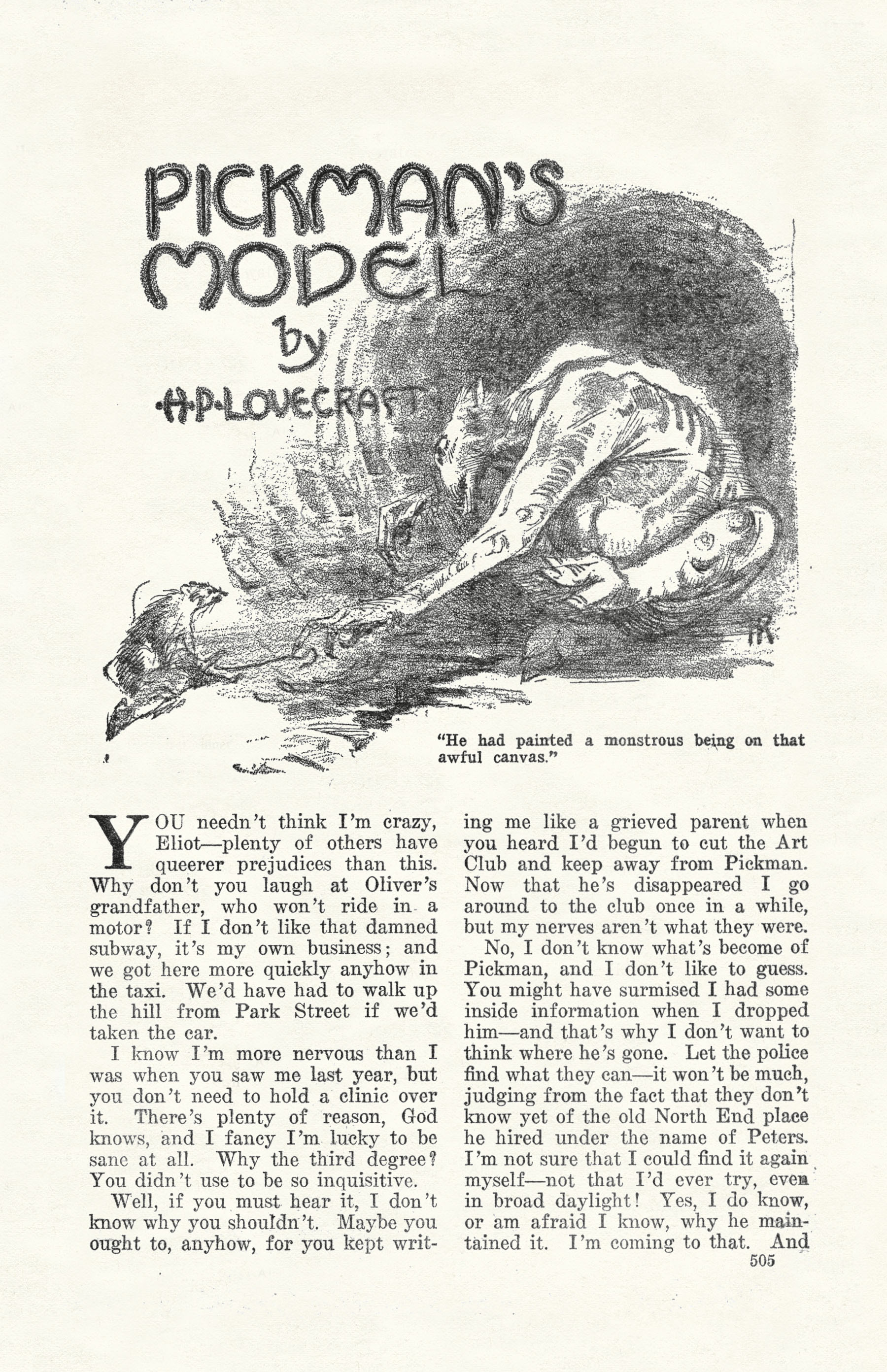
- Title page of "Pickman's Model" as it appeared in Weird Tales, October 1927. Illustration by Hugh Rankin.

Text available at Wikisource
- Country: United States
- Language: English
- Genre: Horror short story

Publication
- Published in: Weird Tales
- Publication type: Periodical
- Media type: Print (magazine)
- Publication date: October 1927

"Pickman's Model" is a short story by H. P. Lovecraft, written in September 1926 and first published in the October 1927 issue of Weird Tales.

It has been adapted for television anthology series twice: in a 1971 episode of Night Gallery, starring Bradford Dillman, and in a 2022 episode of Guillermo del Toro's Cabinet of Curiosities, starring Crispin Glover and Ben Barnes.

== Plot ==
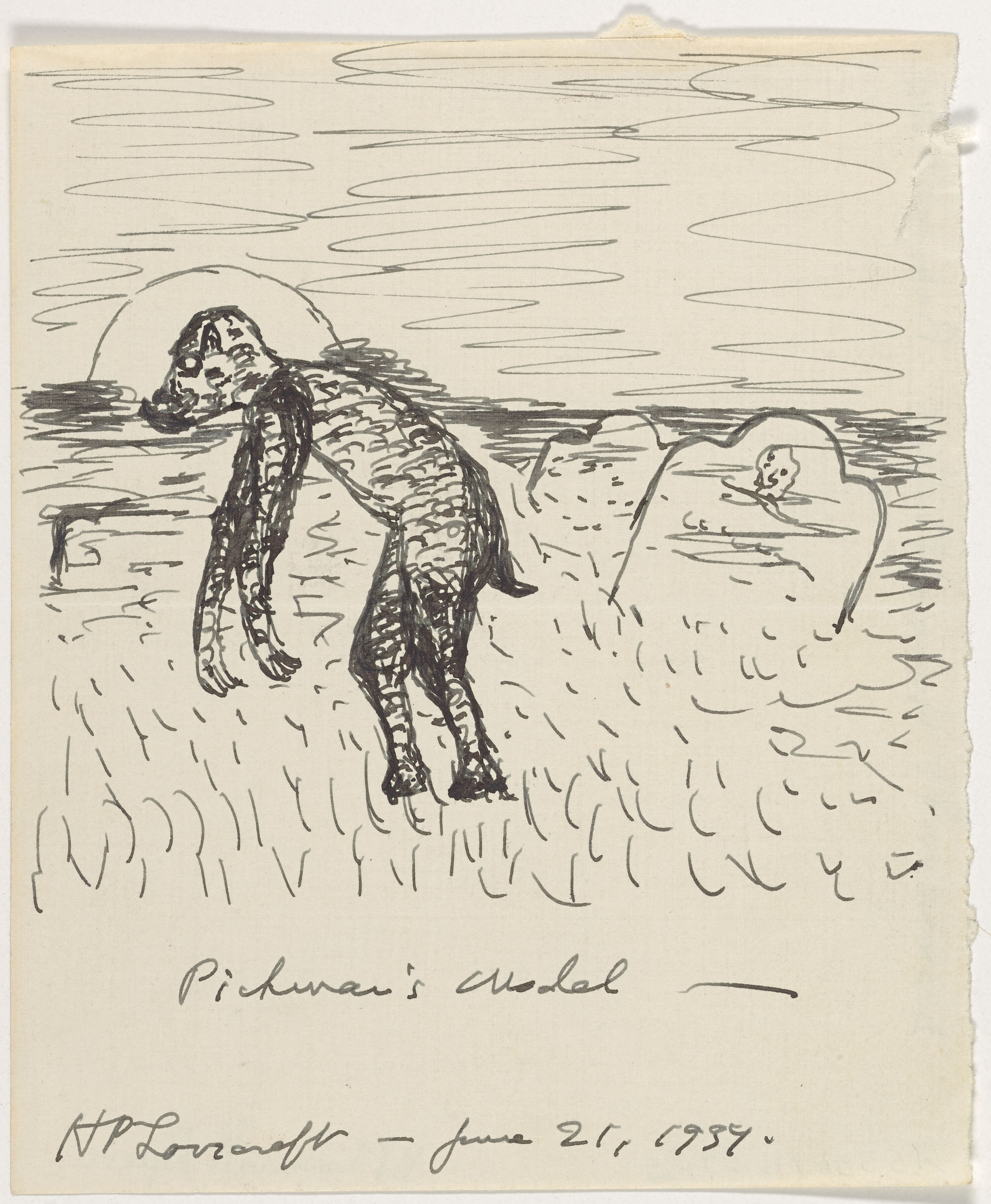
Illustration by Lovecraft, 1934

The story revolves around a Bostonian painter named Richard Upton Pickman, who creates horrifying images. His works are brilliantly executed, yet are so graphic that they result in the revocation of his membership in the Boston Art Club and his ostracism from the city's artistic community. The narrator is a friend of Pickman, who, after the artist's mysterious disappearance, relates to another acquaintance how he was taken on a tour of Pickman's personal gallery, hidden away in a rundown backwater slum. As the two delved deeper into Pickman's mind and art, the rooms seemed to grow ever more evil and the paintings ever more horrific, ending with a final enormous painting of an unearthly, red-eyed, and vaguely canine humanoid balefully chewing on a human victim.

A noise sent Pickman running outside the room with a gun, while the narrator reached out to unfold what looked like a small piece of rolled paper attached to the monstrous painting. The narrator heard some shots, and Pickman walked back in with the smoking gun, telling a story of shooting some rats, and the two men departed. Afterwards, the narrator realized that he had nervously grabbed and put the rolled paper in his pocket when the shots were fired. He unrolled it, to reveal that it was a photograph not of the background of the painting, but of the subject. Pickman drew his inspirations not from a diseased imagination, but from monsters that were very much real.

== Characters ==
- Richard Upton Pickman: Pickman is depicted as a renowned Boston painter notorious for his ghoulish works. His great-great-great-great-grandmother was hanged by Cotton Mather during the Salem witch trials of 1692. ("Pickman" and "Upton" are, in reality, old Salem names.) In 1926, Pickman vanished from his home—a date only given in Lovecraft's "History of the Necronomicon". Pickman reappears as a ghoul in The Dream-Quest of Unknown Kadath (1926) and aids Randolph Carter in his journeys.

Lovecraft scholar Robert M. Price writes, "Dream-Quest Of Unknown Kadath's Pickman surely bears little relationship to the character of the same name we met in 'Pickman's Model', though he is ostensibly the same person." He suggests that the portrayal of Pickman in Dream-Quest is influenced by the character of Tars Tarkas in Edgar Rice Burroughs' A Princess of Mars.

- Thurber: The narrator, who gets to know Pickman while working on "a monograph about weird art", describes himself as "fairly 'hard-boiled'", as well as "middle-aged and decently sophisticated". He is apparently a World War I veteran: "I guess you saw enough of me in France to know I'm not easily knocked out."

Given this description, An H. P. Lovecraft Encyclopedia finds Thurber's horror at Pickman's paintings "implausible ... strained and hysterical". Thurber is one of several Lovecraft characters to develop a phobia as a result of his horrific experiences; his fear of subways and other underground spaces resembles that of the narrator of "The Lurking Fear", who "cannot see a well or a subway entrance without shuddering".

- Eliot: The character that Thurber tells his story to, who is effectively the story's audience surrogate. While none of his lines are printed, his questions and interjections are implied by Thurber's dialogue.

== Setting ==
Like the Brooklyn neighborhood portrayed in Lovecraft's "The Horror at Red Hook", Boston's North End is depicted as a rundown section inhabited by immigrants and honeycombed by subterranean passageways. Pickman declares:

What do maps and records and guide-books really tell of the North End? Bah! At a guess I'll guarantee to lead you to thirty or forty alleys and networks of alleys north of Prince Street that aren't suspected by ten living beings outside of the foreigners that swarm them.

Prince Street, like Henchman Street, Charter Street, and Greenough Lane, are actual North End streets. Though the story is vague about the precise location of Pickman's studio, it was apparently inspired by an actual North End building. Lovecraft wrote that when he visited the neighborhood with Donald Wandrei, he found "the actual alley & house of the tale utterly demolished, a whole crooked line of buildings having been torn down".

== Inspiration ==
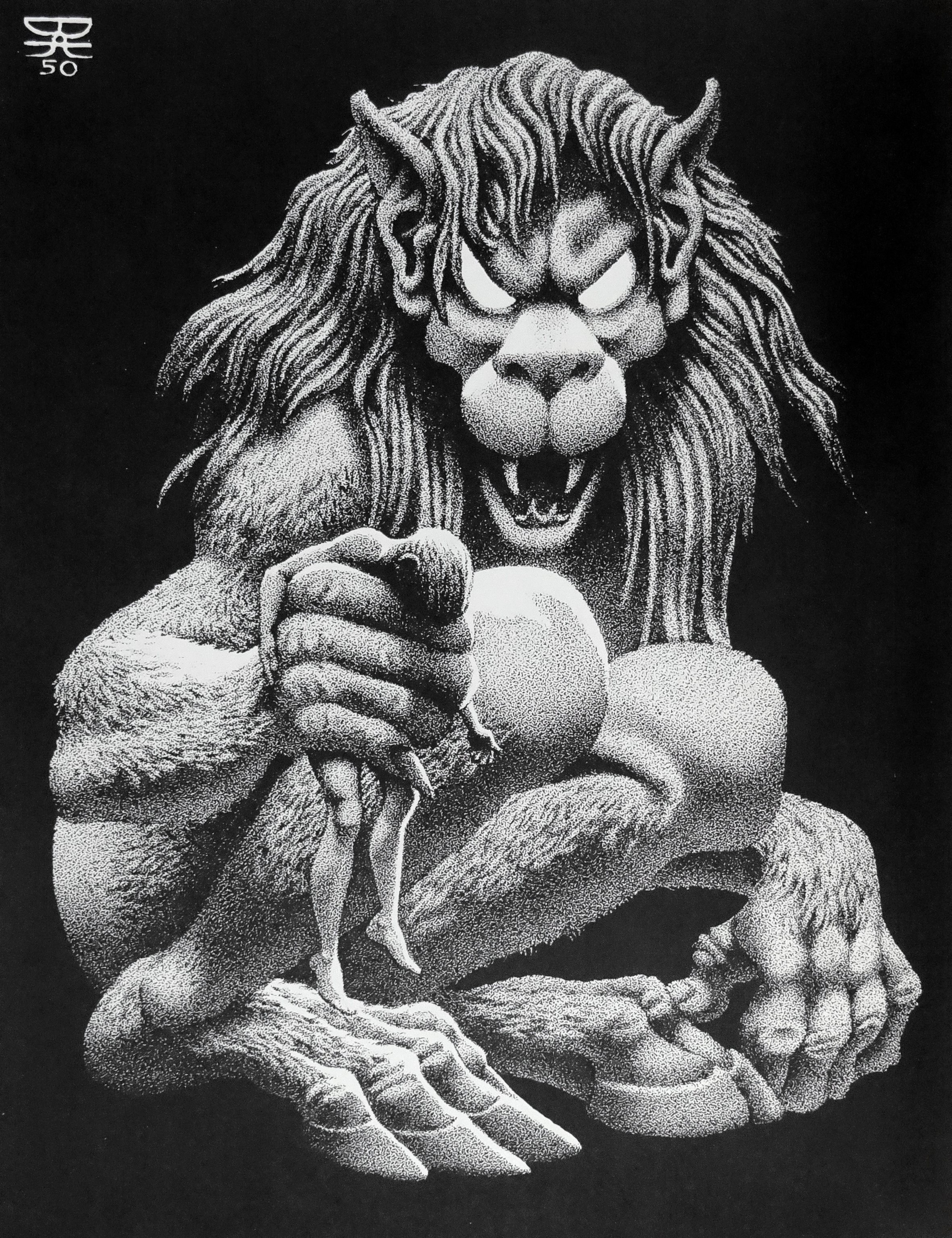
Hannes Bok's illustration for the printing of the story in the December 1951 issue of Famous Fantastic Mysteries

Pickman's aesthetic principles of horror resemble those in Lovecraft's essay "Supernatural Horror in Literature" (1925–1927), on which he was working at the time the short story was composed. When Thurber, the story's narrator, notes that "only the real artist knows the actual anatomy of the terrible or the physiology of fear—the exact sort of lines and proportions that connect up with latent instincts or hereditary memories of fright, and the proper colour contrasts and lighting effects to stir the dormant sense of strangeness", he is echoing Lovecraft the literary critic on Poe, who "understood so perfectly the very mechanics and physiology of fear and strangeness".

Thurber's description of Pickman as a "thorough, painstaking, and almost scientific realist" recalls Lovecraft's approach to horror in his post-Dunsanian phase.

The story compares Pickman's work to that of a number of actual artists, including Henry Fuseli (1741–1825), Gustave Doré (1832–1883), Sidney Sime (1867–1941), Anthony Angarola (1893–1929), Francisco Goya (1746–1828), and Clark Ashton Smith (1893–1961).

== Technique ==
The technique of the story is unusual for Lovecraft. The first-person narrative takes the form of a monologue directed at the reader in effect as a fictive listener, whose presumed interjections are implied via the narrator's responses to them. Tangential comments reveal that the conversation takes place in the narrator's Boston drawing room in the evening, where the two have just arrived via taxi. Pickman's narrative-within-the-narrative is also a monologue, directed in turn at the outer narrator as listener. Both narratives are colloquial, casual, and emotionally expressive, which is atypical of Lovecraft's protagonists and style.

== Connections ==
- The motif of a character emptying all six bullets from a revolver also appears in the Lovecraft stories "Herbert West–Reanimator" and "The Thing on the Doorstep".

== Critical reaction ==
Fritz Leiber, in his essay "A Literary Copernicus", praised the story for the "supreme chill" of its final line. Peter Cannon calls the tale "a well-nigh perfect example of Poe's unity of effect principle", though he cites as its "one weakness" the "contrived ending". An H. P. Lovecraft Encyclopedia dismisses the story as "relatively conventional".

== Adaptations ==
- In 1971, writer Roy Thomas and artist Tom Palmer adapted "Pickman's Model" for the Marvel Comics horror anthology Tower of Shadows (#9, Jan. 1971), reprinted in Marvel's Masters of Terror (#2, Sept. 1975).
- In 1972, the television show Night Gallery adapted "Pickman's Model" as a segment. In the TV version, the character of the narrator in the short story becomes a woman (Louise Sorel) who has fallen in love with Pickman (Bradford Dillman).
- In Chilling Adventures of Sabrina (Part 2, Episode 4) the short segment "Harvey" shows a possible future in which the character Harvey has a roommate who can see otherworldly creatures through a portal in his closet, the visages of which he replicates through paintings and sells for a tidy profit. Unfortunately, the interactions with the creatures come at a great price to his sanity, leading him to commit suicide by hanging.
- The story is adapted as an episode, directed by Keith Thomas and written by Lee Patterson, for Guillermo del Toro's Cabinet of Curiosities. Crispin Glover portrays Pickman and Ben Barnes plays Thurber. The plot is greatly expanded, using the events of the story as a jumping-off point for a broad Lovecraftian pastiche, including witches, cultists, and an implied apocalypse at the hands of a Great Old One, possibly Shub-Niggurath or Yog-Sothoth. Thurber and Pickman are depicted as old classmates at Miskatonic University, Thurber's family life is fleshed out with a wife and son, Pickman is shot by Thurber and eaten by his ghouls, and an exhibition of Pickman's paintings drives both Thurber's family and the Boston art intelligentsia to self-destructive madness.

== Other media ==
- R. U. Pickman is a prominent character in Lovecraftian: The Shipwright Circle by Steven Philip Jones. The Lovecraftian series reimagines the weird tales of H. P. Lovecraft into one single-universe modern epic.
- In the 1994 Lovecraftian John Carpenter film In the Mouth of Madness, the Sam Neill and Julie Carmen characters stay at Pickman's Inn, whose innkeeper, Mrs. Pickman, is played by Frances Bay. ("Pickman's Motel" would have been nearly identical to the title of the Lovecraft story, but a motel would not be in keeping with the nature of the town of Hobb's End, New Hampshire, where the inn is located).
- In Stephen King's novel It, an artist named Pickman takes part in the 1929 ambush of the Bradley Gang at the Derry city square.
- In the 2015 video game Fallout 4, there is a man named Pickman who kills raiders, collects their heads, and uses their blood to make disturbing paintings, which are displayed in a building called "Pickman's Gallery", located in the North End of the video game's post-apocalyptic Boston.

== See also ==
- A Short Film About John Bolton, a 2003 film by Neil Gaiman with a similar concept
- "The Horror in the Museum", a short story by Lovecraft with similar elements
- Guillermo del Toro's Cabinet of Curiosities, a horror anthology series that adapts the story into an episode

== Sources ==
- Lovecraft, Howard P. (1984) [1927]. "Pickman's Model". In S. T. Joshi (ed.). The Dunwich Horror and Others (9th corrected printing ed.). Sauk City, WI: Arkham House. ISBN 0-87054-037-8. Definitive version.
- Lovecraft, Howard P. (1999) [1927]. "Pickman's Model". In S. T. Joshi; Peter Cannon (eds.). More Annotated Lovecraft (1st ed.). New York: Dell. ISBN 0-440-50875-4. With explanatory footnotes.
- Sederholm, Carl, "What Screams are Made Of: Representing Cosmic Fear in H. P. Lovecraft's "Pickman's Model"", Journal of the Fantastic in the Arts, Vol. 16, No. 4 (64) (Winter 2006), pp. 335–349.
