= The Silver Key =

1929 short story by H. P. Lovecraft

- Short story by H. P. Lovecraft
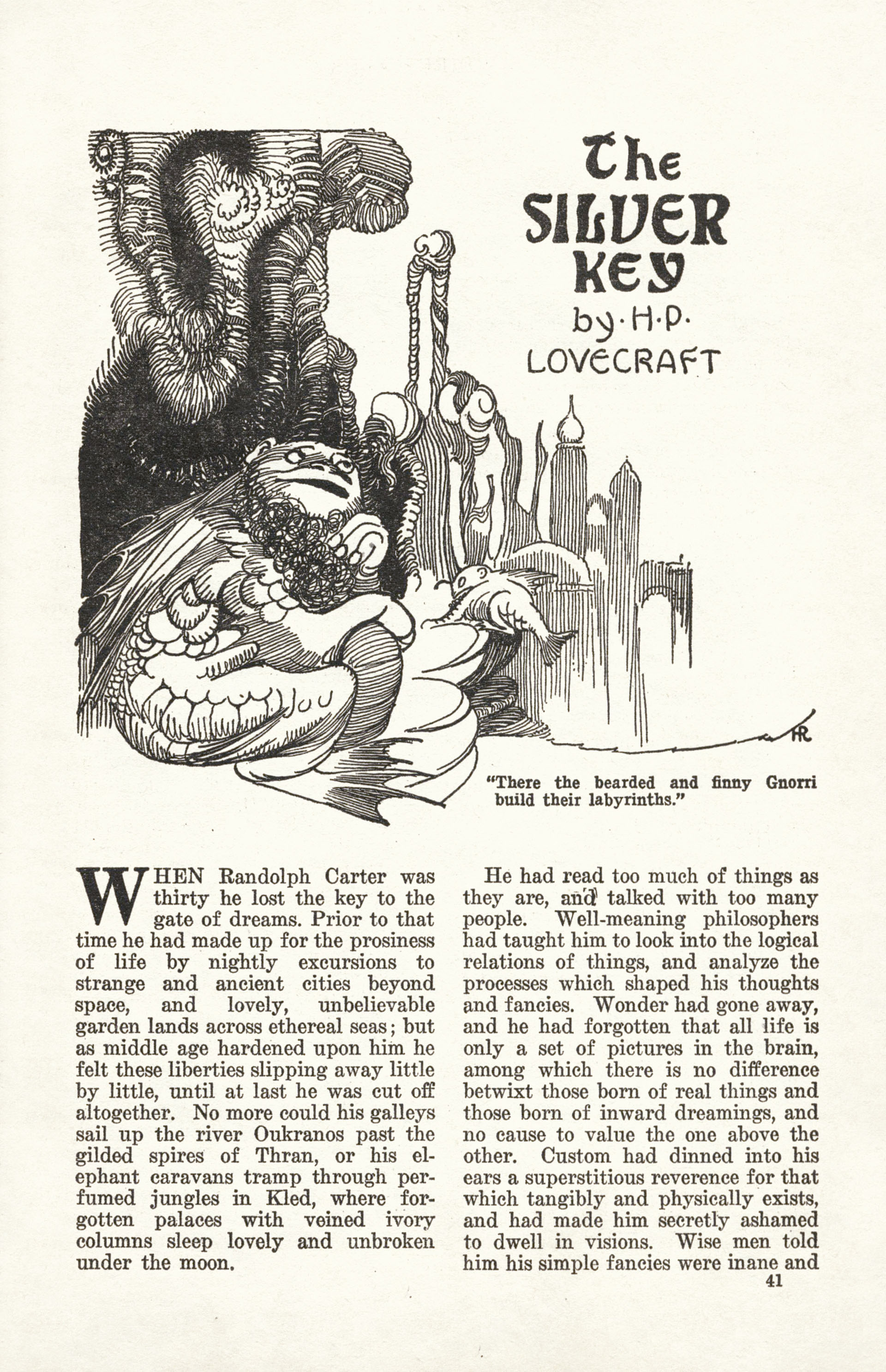
- Title page of "The Silver Key" as it appeared in Weird Tales, January 1929. Illustration by Hugh Rankin.

Text available at Wikisource
- Country: United States
- Language: English
- Genres: Fantasy, weird fiction

Publication
- Published in: Weird Tales
- Publication date: January 1929

"The Silver Key" is a fantasy short story by American writer H. P. Lovecraft. Written in 1926, it is considered part of his Dreamlands series. It was first published in the January 1929 issue of Weird Tales. It is a continuation of "The Dream-Quest of Unknown Kadath", and was followed by a sequel, "Through the Gates of the Silver Key", co-written with E. Hoffmann Price. The story and its sequel both feature Lovecraft's recurring character of Randolph Carter as the protagonist.

== Plot ==
Randolph Carter discovers, at the age of 30, that he has gradually "lost the key to the gate of dreams." Randolph once believed life is made up of nothing but pictures in memory, whether they be from real life or dreams. He highly prefers his romantic nightly dreams of fantastic places and beings to the "prosiness of life". He believes his dreams to reveal truths missing from man's waking ideas, regarding the purpose of humans and the universe, primary among these being the truth of beauty as perceived and invented by humans in times past.

As he ages, though, he finds that his daily waking exposure to the more "practical", scientific ideas of man has eroded his ability to dream as he once did and has made him, regretfully, subscribe more and more to the mundane beliefs of everyday, waking "real life". But, still not certain which is truer, he sets out to determine whether the waking ideas of man are superior to his dreams, and in the process, he passes through several unsatisfying philosophical stances. Discouraged, he eventually withdraws from these lines of inquiry, and goes into seclusion.

After a time, a hint of the fantastic enters his dreams again, though he is still unable to dream of the strange cities of his youth, leaving him wanting more. During one of these dreams, his long-dead grandfather tells him of a silver key in his attic, inscribed with mysterious arabesque symbols, which he finds and takes with him on a visit to his boyhood home in the backwoods of northeastern Massachusetts (the setting for many of Lovecraft's stories), where he enters a mysterious cave that he used to play in. The key somehow enables him to return to his childhood as a ten-year-old boy, and his adult self disappears from his normal time.

The story then relates how Randolph's relatives had noted, beginning at the age of ten, that he had somehow gained the ability to glimpse events in his future. The narrator of the story then states that he expects to meet Randolph soon, in one of his own dreams, "in a certain dream-city we both used to haunt", reigning there as a new king, where the narrator may look at Randolph's key, whose symbols he hopes will tell him the mysteries of the cosmos.

== Connections ==
"The Silver Key" alludes to other Lovecraft stories that feature Randolph Carter, allowing the reader to place these stories in chronological order: first The Dream-Quest of Unknown Kadath, then "The Statement of Randolph Carter", followed by "The Unnamable". "The Silver Key" and "Through the Gates of the Silver Key" are set at the end of this sequence.

An H. P. Lovecraft Encyclopedia compares "The Silver Key" to Lovecraft's early story "The Tomb", whose narrator, Jervas Dudley, also "discovers in his attic a physical key that allows him to unlock the secrets of the past."

== Inspiration ==
"The Silver Key" is thought to have been inspired in part by Lovecraft's visit to Foster, Rhode Island, where his maternal ancestors lived. The character Benijah Corey from the story seems to combine the names of Emma Corey Phillips, one of Lovecraft's relatives, and Benejah Place, a farmer who lived across the street from the home where Lovecraft stayed.

Carter's search for meaning through a succession of philosophical and aesthetic approaches may have been inspired by J. K. Huysmans' A rebours (1884), whose main character undertakes a similar progression.

== Reaction ==
Weird Tales editor Farnsworth Wright rejected "The Silver Key" when Lovecraft submitted it in mid-1927. The next year, however, Wright asked to see the story again and accepted it. He later told Lovecraft that the story was "violently disliked" by readers.

== Influence ==
- The Silver Key was used as an artifact that caused people to see waking dreams of Lovecraft's creatures in a fourth-season episode of the mystery series Warehouse 13.
- In Jonathan L. Howard's novel Johannes Cabal: The Fear Institute, the Silver Key is an artifact that allows physical access to Dreamlands for people who wouldn't be able to get in the normal way, such as scientifically-minded Cabal.
- In Wild Arms 2, the demon summoner Caina uses a large magical key as a weapon, which is named Randolph the Magic Key.
- In Gnosia, the parasite that allows its host to loop time and travel between dimensions is called the "Silver Key".

== Other media ==
- The Silver Key features prominently in Lovecraftian: The Shipwright Circle by Steven Philip Jones. The Lovecraftian series reimagines the weird tales of H. P. Lovecraft into one single universe modern epic.
