= The Unnamable (short story) =

1923 short story by H. P. Lovecraft

- Short story by H. P. Lovecraft
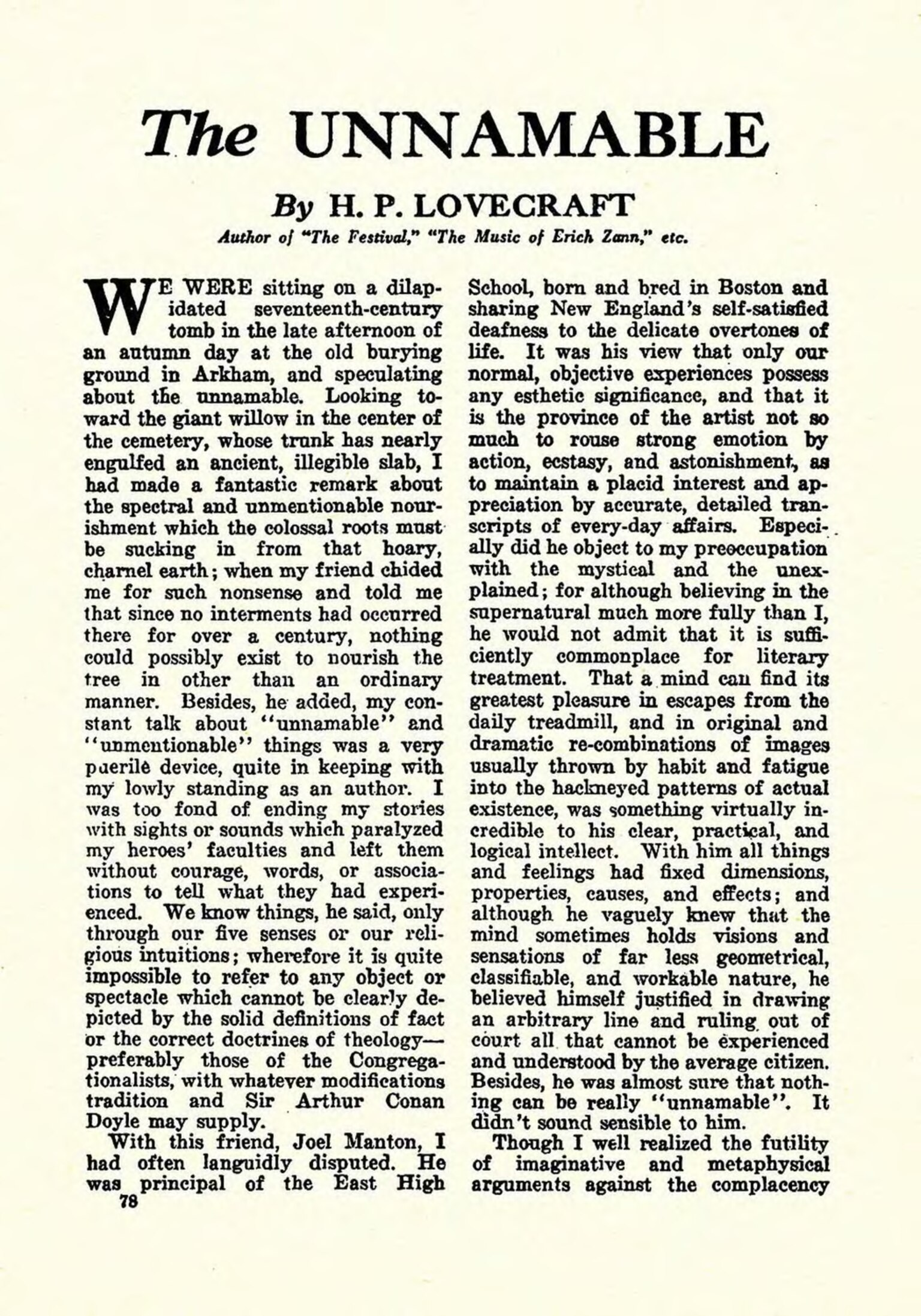

Text available at Wikisource
- Country: United States
- Language: English
- Genre: Horror

Publication
- Published in: Weird Tales
- Publication date: 1925

"The Unnamable" is a horror short story by American author H. P. Lovecraft. It was written in September 1923, first published in the July 1925 issue of Weird Tales, and first collected in Beyond the Wall of Sleep in 1943. The corrected text appears in Dagon and Other Macabre Tales (revised ed. 1986). The story's locale was inspired by the Charter Street Historic District Burying Ground in Salem.

== Plot ==
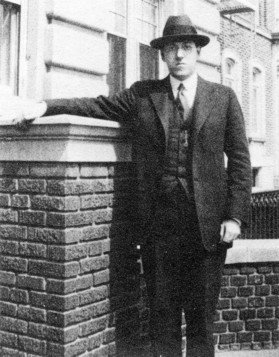
Lovecraft in 1922

Carter, a weird fiction writer (likely Randolph Carter who features in some of Lovecraft's other tales such as "The Statement of Randolph Carter") meets with his close friend, Joel Manton, in a cemetery near an old, dilapidated house on Meadow Hill in the town of Arkham, Massachusetts. As the two sit upon a weathered tomb, Carter tells Manton the tale of an indescribable entity that allegedly haunts the house and surrounding area. He contends that because such an entity cannot be perceived by the five senses, it becomes impossible to quantify and accurately describe, thus earning itself the term unnamable.

As the narration closes, this unnamable presence attacks both Carter and Manton. Both men survive and awaken later at St. Mary's hospital. They suffer from various lacerations, including scarring from a large horn-shaped object and bruises in the shape of hoof-prints on their backs. Manton describes the unnamable in the closing passage of the story:

It was everywhere — a gelatin — a slime; a vapor; — yet it had shapes, a thousand shapes of horror beyond all memory. There were eyes — and a blemish. It was the pit — the maelstrom — the ultimate abomination. Carter, it was the unnamable!

== Characters ==
- Carter: Carter is usually identified with Randolph Carter, a recurring, autobiographical character in Lovecraft's fiction. The incident in "The Unnamable" is alluded to in "The Silver Key" (1926), which records that Carter "went back to Arkham...and had experiences in the dark, amidst the hoary willows, and tottering gambrel roofs, which made him seal forever certain pages in the diary of a wild-minded ancestor." However, the Carter of "The Unnamable" does not believe in the supernatural, which would conflict with the supernatural events of "The Statement of Randolph Carter". The Carter of this story also seems to be a reflection of Lovecraft himself, as shown when: "he added, my constant talk about 'unnamable' and 'unmentionable' things was a very puerile device, quite in keeping with my lowly standing as an author. I was too fond of ending my stories with sights or sounds which paralysed my heroes' faculties and left them without courage, words, or associations to tell what they had experienced." This is quite in standing with Lovecraft's work up to this point in his career, much of which uses similar plot devices to those described, such as entities beyond comprehension and protagonists driven mad by their experiences.
- Joel Manton: The character of Joel Manton is based on Lovecraft's friend Maurice W. Moe. Manton is principal of the "East High School", while Moe taught at Milwaukee's West Division High School; Manton, like Moe, is a religious believer, in contrast to Carter's (and Lovecraft's) skepticism.
- The Unnamable: Lovecraft leaves the exact nature and origins of the Unnamable itself vague. It is hinted that it was born in the late 17th or early 18th century, and kept hidden away in the attic of the now-abandoned house associated with the legend. The original reports of the creature, as told by Carter, indicate a devil-like figure. There are references throughout the story to the creature having horns and hooves, and Carter, when relating how he found the thing's bones in the attic of the old house, mentions "four-inch horns, but a face and jaw something like yours and mine." There are also references to the thing's "blemished eye," and a "screaming drunken wretch that they hanged for having such an eye." Eventually, the legends, in the words of Carter, "take on a spectral character - I suppose the thing, if it was a living thing, must have died." After their encounter in the cemetery, Manton describes the monster as "everywhere -- a gelatin -- a slime -- yet it had shapes, a thousand shapes of horror beyond all memory. There were eyes -- and a blemish." Tellingly, the men are left with wounds of hooves and horns.

== Adaptations ==
"The Unnamable" has been loosely adapted into two motion pictures. Both films were written and directed by Jean-Paul Ouellette and have only a tangential connection to the original short story: The Unnamable (1988) and The Unnamable II: The Statement of Randolph Carter (1993). A closer adaptation is a 2011 short film by Sascha Renninger, Shadow of the Unnamable.

== Other media ==
- The Unnamable features prominently in Lovecraftian: The Shipwright Circle by Steven Philip Jones. The Lovecraftian series reimagines the weird tales of H. P. Lovecraft into one single universal modern epic.

== Sources ==
- Lovecraft, Howard P. (1986). S. T. Joshi (ed.). Dagon and Other Macabre Tales (9th corrected printing ed.). Sauk City, WI: Arkham House. ISBN 0-87054-039-4. Definitive version.
