= The Statement of Randolph Carter =

1919 short story by H. P. Lovecraft

- Short story by H. P. Lovecraft
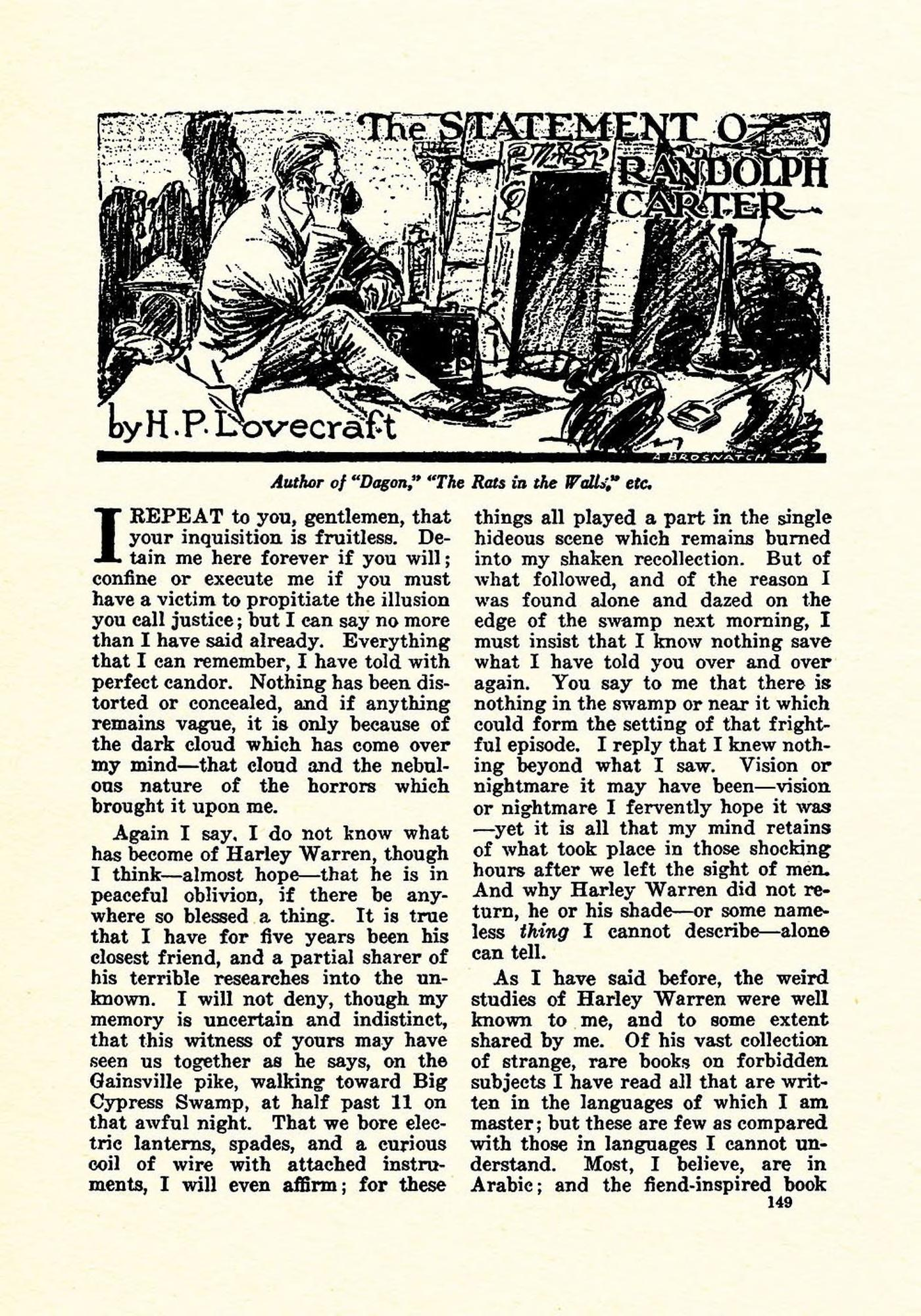
- Title page of "The Statement of Randolph Carter" as it appeared in Weird Tales, February 1925, the second time the story was published. Illustration by Andrew Brosnatch.

Text available at Wikisource
- Country: United States
- Language: English
- Genre: Horror

Publication
- Publisher: The Vagrant
- Media type: Magazine
- Publication date: May, 1920

"The Statement of Randolph Carter" is a short story by American writer H. P. Lovecraft. Written in December 1919, it was first published in The Vagrant, May 1920. It tells of a traumatic event in the life of Randolph Carter, a student of the occult loosely representing Lovecraft himself. It is the first story in which Carter appears. Its adaptations include the film The Unnamable II: The Statement of Randolph Carter.

== Plot ==
"The Statement of Randolph Carter" is the first person testimony of the titular character, who has been found wandering through swampland in an amnesiac shock. In his statement, Carter attempts to explain the disappearance of his companion, the occultist Harley Warren.

Warren has come into the possession of a book, written in an unknown language, the exact contents of which he never revealed to Carter. Carter mentions that Warren has other "strange, rare books on forbidden subjects", several of which are in Arabic.

From his mysterious book, Warren apparently deduces that doors or stairways exist between the surface world and the underworld. He encourages Carter to travel with him to the location of one such portal, an ancient graveyard near Big Cypress Swamp. Upon arriving, Warren locates a particular tomb, and opens it to reveal a staircase that descends into the earth. Taking a lantern, he leaves Carter on the surface, and follows the stairs into the darkness, communicating with his companion by a telephone wire.

After several minutes of silence, Warren suddenly begins to make vague, panicked outbursts that culminate in a desperate plea for Carter to flee. Finally, after Warren is silent for several minutes, Carter calls to him down the line, only to hear an alien voice telling him that Warren is dead.

== Characters ==
=== Randolph Carter ===
Randolph Carter is one of Lovecraft's most commonly recurring characters. An H. P. Lovecraft Encyclopedia places the events of the story after those of The Dream Quest of Unknown Kadath and before "The Unnamable" or "The Silver Key".

=== Harley Warren ===
Harley Warren is a mysterious occultist who apparently perishes while exploring an underground crypt in Big Cypress Swamp. After his disappearance, Randolph Carter tells police that "I have for five years been his closest friend, and a partial sharer of his terrible researches into the unknown." Warren, he says, "always dominated me, and sometimes I feared him." He mentions a facial expression of Warren's that caused him to shudder. Warren himself suggests that he sees himself as someone with "ironclad sensibilities".

Carter describes Warren as having a "vast collection of strange, rare books on forbidden subjects," many of them apparently in Arabic, with one "fiend-inspired book...written in characters whose like I never saw elsewhere." In the dream that inspired the story, the Warren character was actually Lovecraft's friend Samuel Loveman. Loveman also figured in the dream that became the prose poem "Nyarlathotep".

Warren is referred to in other Lovecraft stories. In "The Silver Key", he is alluded to as "a man in the south, who was shunned and feared for the blasphemous things he read in prehistoric books and clay tablets smuggled from India and Arabia." In "Through the Gates of the Silver Key", he is revealed to have come from South Carolina, and to have been an expert linguist of the primal Naacal language of the Himalayas. Warren is also mentioned in Brian Lumley's Titus Crow series, as a member of a Bostonian group of psychics.

== Inspiration ==
Lovecraft based the story on a dream that he transcribed, adding only a preamble to make it more fluid as a narrative, and wrote it in the form of a testimony given to the police. An account of the actual dream Lovecraft had can be found in one of his letters to August Derleth.

== Connections ==
The story contains an early statement of a common theme of Lovecraft's—the terrible price of knowledge:

As to the nature of our studies—must I say again that I no longer retain full comprehension? It seems to me rather merciful that I do not, for they were terrible studies, which I pursued more through reluctant fascination than through actual inclination.

This theme is most famously stated in "The Call of Cthulhu": "The most merciful thing in the world, I think, is the inability of the human mind to correlate all its contents."

== Adaptations ==
- The story has inspired several films, including The Testimony of Randolph Carter (1987), The Unnamable II: The Statement of Randolph Carter (1993), 13:de mars, 1941 (2004), The Statement of Randolph Carter (2005), Kammaren (2007), and Visions of Sonya Greene (2024).
- Radio adaptation by Macabre Fantasy Radio Theater was performed live at the H. P. Lovecraft Film Festival in September 2012.
- "The Statement of Randolph Carter" was loosely adapted as a horror comic known as H.P. Lovecraft's The Grave
- The song "You Fool, Warren is Dead!" by The Darkest of the Hillside Thickets is based on the story.
