= Jean-Paul Ouellette =

American film director

Jean-Paul Ouellette is a film director, producer and writer. He has achieved a certain amount of success, mostly in the H.P. Lovecraft movie adaptation circle with The Unnamable and its sequel The Unnamable II: The Statement of Randolph Carter. He has also been involved in other productions, such as James Cameron's The Terminator. He now works mainly for television but is still contributing to the motion picture industry.

== Life ==
Ouellette was born in Boston and began film making at the age of 14, and began doing it professionally once he finished college, where he studied English and graphic design. After college, he moved to Los Angeles to be taught by Russ Meyer, and later by Orson Welles and finally Don Richardson. He has worked for such film companies as New Line Cinema, Cannon Pictures, New World Cinema and Orion Pictures.

== Filmography ==
| Year | Title | Director | Writer | Producer |
|---|---|---|---|---|
| 1987 | Top Kids (TV) | No | Yes | No |
| 1988 | The Unnamable | Yes | Yes | Yes |
| 1990 | Chinatown Connection | Yes | No | No |
| 1993 | The Unnamable II: The Statement of Randolph Carter | Yes | Yes | Yes |
| 2002 | The Strangler's Wife | No | Yes | No |
| 2003 | The Messenger | No | Yes | Yes |
| 2005 | Everyone's Got One | No | No | Yes |
| 2005 | Spaghetti & Matzo Balls | No | No | Yes |
| 2006 | Manual | No | No | Yes |
| 2008 | Cercie in New York | Yes | No | No |

Other roles'

- Roar (film) (1981) (script supervisor)
- The Terminator (1984) (2nd unit director: action)
- Automatic Drip (2004) (1st assistant director)
