= The Unnamable (film) =

1988 American horror film by Jean-Paul Ouellette

- Release poster
- Directed by: Jean-Paul Ouellette
- Screenplay by: Jean-Paul Ouellette
- Based on: "The Unnamable" by Howard Phillips Lovecraft
- Produced by: Dean Ramser; Jean-Paul Ouellette
- Starring: Charles King; Mark Kinsey Stephenson; Alexandra Durrell
- Cinematography: Tom Fraser
- Edited by: Wendy J. Plump
- Music by: David Bergeaud
- Production companies: K. P. Productions, Inc.; Yankee Classic Pictures
- Distributed by: Vidmark Entertainment
- Release date: June 1988
- Running time: 88 minutes
- Country: United States
- Language: English

The Unnamable is a 1988 American horror film directed, written, and produced by Jean-Paul Ouellette. It is based on H. P. Lovecraft's short story of the same name. The film is about a group of university students that made the poor decision to stay overnight in a 'haunted house'. Mark Kinsey Stephenson played the lead role, Randolph Carter (a well known H.P. Lovecraft character), alongside Charles King.

== Plot ==
In the late 18th century, in the Winthrop house, something within it is screaming and banging at the walls of its confines. Joshua Winthrop, the owner of the house, rushes through the poorly lit corridors of the house before unlocking a heavily locked door. He begins talking to the creature inside to calm her down but she then kills him.

Randolph Carter regales two of his university buddies, Howard Damon and Joel Manton, with ghost stories. Randolph points out that they are sitting in the graveyard surrounding the haunted house of his tales (which happens to be within the limits of observation). The story that Randolph had been telling them was of Joshua Winthrop and his demon daughter, Alyda Winthrop. Joel comes up with the idea to stay there overnight. Randolph and Howard go back to the university, leaving Joel alone in the house.

Soon a group of students decide to go there, two young lads fresh from the university football team, Bruce Weeks and John Babcock, and a couple of girls that they want to score with: one of which Howard is in love with, Wendy Barnes. The other, Tanya Heller, is "in love" with Howard. They go there and get set up in a room to tell each other ghost stories. Meanwhile, Howard chases after Randolph to tell him that Joel never came back from the house, prompting Randolph to swing into action saying "I'll get the flashlights" with some degree of authority and urgency, despite not being too bothered about the missing student prior to that.

Alyda Winthrop, the creature, begins stalking the four, planning to kill them as she killed her father and Joel. Soon Joel's decapitated corpse is found hanging upside down, his blood dripping onto a plate of some sort, along with his head, that rolls across the floor to look at a half naked Wendy. Soon Randolph and Howard arrive at the house and Randolph discovers that the door has locked of its own accord upon their entry, which he thinks to be magic. Howard runs off to the aid of Wendy and Tanya, while Randolph decides to study The Necronomicon. In it he finds a spell to unlock the door. He goes outside and enters the ground under a tree via the tomb of Joshua Winthrop. This tree, with the aid of Randolph and the book, snatches Alyda from the house in the climax of the film, leaving Howard and Tanya the only two alive and in the desperately terrifying vicinity of the female demon.

Howard and Tanya flee from the house and run to a safe distance, but a hand comes up from the ground and begins pulling Howard down. It is Randolph coming up from the catacombs beneath having fended off the skeleton guardians.

== Cast ==
- Charles King as Howard Damon
- Mark Kinsey Stephenson as Randolph Carter
- Alexandra Durrell as Tanya Heller
- Laura Albert as Wendy Barnes
- Eben Ham as Bruce Weeks
- Blane Wheatley as John Babcock
- Mark Parra as Joel Manton
- Delbert Spain as Joshua Winthrop
- Colin Cox as Mr. Craft
- Katrin Alexandre as Alyda Winthrop

== Release ==
The film was released on VHS in the United States by Vidmark Entertainment in both R-rated and unrated editions. As of 2011, the film has only been officially released on DVD in the United Kingdom, by Anchor Bay, in a double pack containing The Unnamable II: The Statement of Randolph Carter under its UK title The Unnamable Returns. Both films are presented in their original 4:3 aspect ratio, with optional DTS soundtracks and various special features. It is now out of print.

In 2018 Unearthed Films released the film on Blu-ray and DVD.

== Reception ==
In their book Lurker in the Lobby: A Guide to the Cinema of H. P. Lovecraft, Andrew Migliore and John Strysik write: "The Unnamable is not a great film, but the low-budget Holmes/Watson team of Randolph Carter and Howard Damon make for fun viewing. Ouellette's restrained direction, Stephenson's performance as Randolph, and [Katrin] Alexandre's elegant portrayal of the creature help lift the film out of the muck of dead-teen flicks from the 1980s and onto the shelf of Lovecraftian cinema." TV Guide gave the film a mixed review awarding it 2 out of 4 stars, complimenting the film's make-up effects, and Re-Animator-like appeal. The Unnameable also received a review from a Cinemafantastique reviewer, who joked that it was "Better titled The Unwatchable."

== Sequel ==
The film was followed by 1993's The Unnamable Returns, also known as The Unnamable II: The Statement of Randolph Carter which featured, alongside Mark Kinsey Stephenson and Charles Clausmeyer, John Rhys-Davies and David Warner. Although this was the only H.P. Lovecraft movie adaptation for John Rhys-Davis, for David Warner it was the first as he would appear in Brian Yuzna's Necronomicon, starring Jeffrey Combs and Signy Coleman.
