= Through the Gates of the Silver Key =

1934 short story by H. P. Lovecraft and E. Hoffmann Price

- Short story by H. P. Lovecraft; E. Hoffmann Price
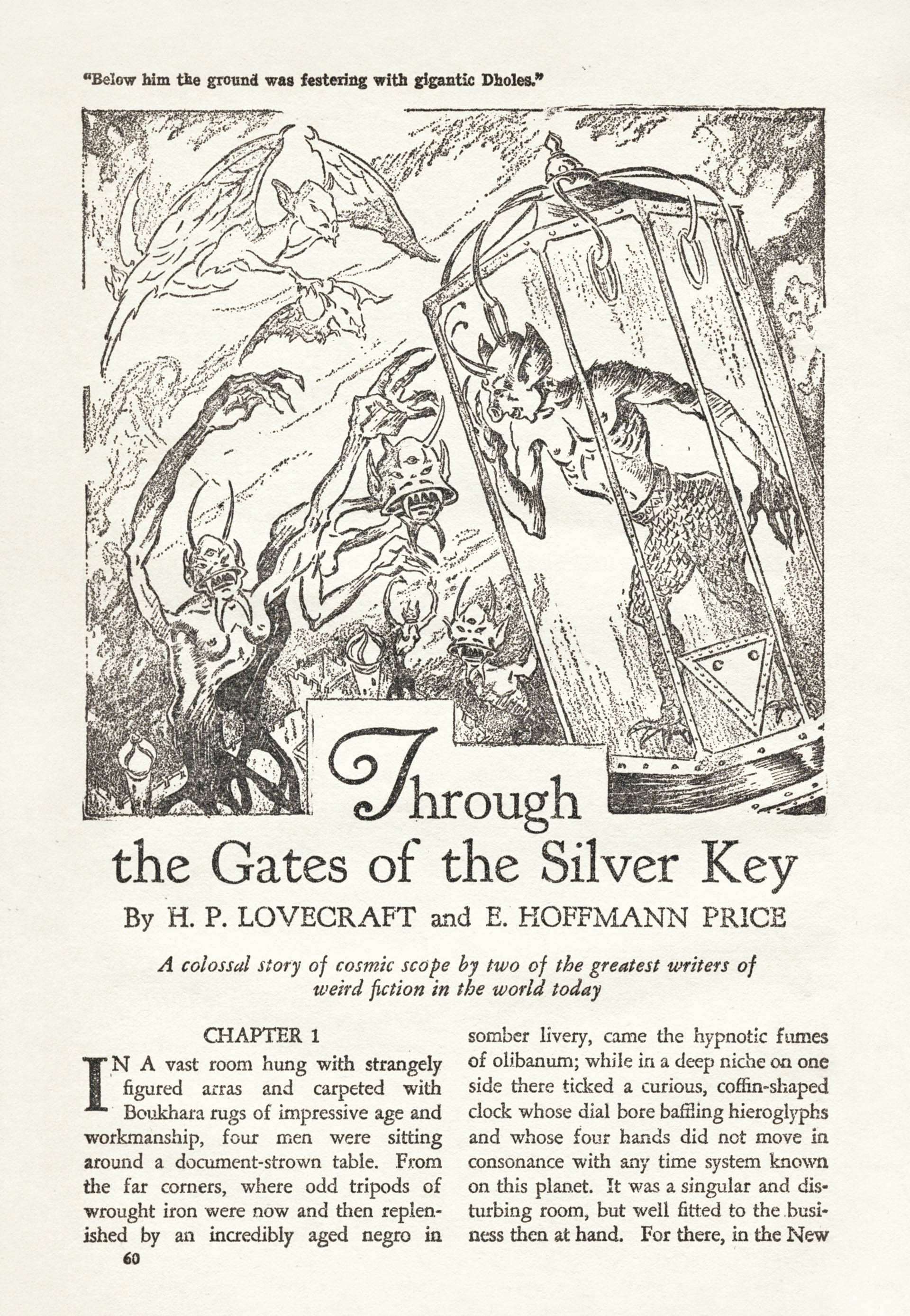
- Title page of "Through the Gates of the Silver Key" as it appeared in Weird Tales, July 1934. Illustration by H. R. Hammond.
- Country: United States
- Language: English
- Genres: Fantasy, weird fiction

Publication
- Published in: Weird Tales
- Publication date: July 1934

"Through the Gates of the Silver Key" is a short story co-written by American writers H. P. Lovecraft and E. Hoffmann Price between October 1932 and April 1933. A sequel to Lovecraft's "The Silver Key", and part of a sequence of stories focusing on Randolph Carter, it was first published in the July 1934 issue of Weird Tales.

== Plot ==
At a gathering to decide the fate of Randolph Carter's estate (which has been held in trust since his disappearance) the mysterious Swami Chandraputra, who wears curious mittens and enveloping robes, tells Carter's acquaintances of his ultimate fate. He explains that after performing its ritual, the Silver Key took Carter to the Outer Extension, a realm transcending spacetime, by transporting him through a cosmic structure known as the First Gate. There, Carter met the Ancient Ones, a group of mystic beings led by 'Umr at-Tawil, a dangerous being warned of in the Necronomicon, saying those who deal with it never return. 'Umr at-Tawil offers Carter a chance to plunge deeper into the cosmos; after Carter accepts, the Ancient Ones manifest and open a structure known as the Ultimate Gate, which takes him to a truly infinite void.

Carter, now reduced to a disembodied facet of himself, encounters an entity implied to be Yog-Sothoth, though he realizes how "slight and fractional" this conception of Yog-Sothoth is compared to the being. The being is said to be "an All-in-One and One-in-All of limitless being and self—not merely a thing of one Space-Time continuum, but allied to the ultimate animating essence of existence’s whole unbounded sweep—the last, utter sweep which has no confines and which outreaches fancy and mathematics alike." The being explains that all conscious beings are facets of much greater beings, which exist outside the traditional model of three dimensions. The inhabitants of the Ultimate Abyss are the archetypes, and who are "formless, ineffable, and guessed at only by rare dreamers on the low-dimensioned worlds", with chief among them being the Supreme Archetype, with all beings, including Carter, Yog-Sothoth and all else being mere facets of it. Carter realizes that what humans call Yog-Sothoth is but a slight and fractional part of the Supreme Archetype. It is seemingly proud of Carter's accomplishments, offers to grant him a wish relating to the many facets of which it is a part. Carter explains that he would love to know more about the facets of a particular long-extinct race on a distant planet, Yaddith, which is constantly threatened by the monstrous Dholes. He has been having persistent dreams about Yaddith in the last few months. The Supreme Archetype accomplishes this by transferring Carter's consciousness into the body of one of his facets among that race, that of Zkauba the wizard, though not before warning Carter to have memorized all his symbols and rites. Carter arrogantly believes that the Silver Key alone will accomplish this claim, but it soon transpires Carter's wish was a mistake; he cannot escape, and is trapped in Zkauba's body. The two beings find each other repugnant, but are now trapped in the same body, periodically changing dominance. Beyond the Ultimate Abyss is the Ultimate Mystery, which the Supreme Archetype offers to show Carter, and which transcends everything before it, as it is the "last and inmost of secrets which lies behind all scenes and dreams" and which is also the "final cosmic reality which belies all local perspectives and narrow partial views".

After a vast amount of time trapped on Yaddith, Carter finds a means of suppressing the alien mind with drugs, and then uses their technology, along with the Silver Key to return both to the present and to Earth, where Carter can retrieve his manuscript with the symbols he needs to work on for regaining his original body. Once there, the Swami reports, Carter did find the manuscript and promptly contacted Swami Chandraputra, instructing him to go to the meeting to say he would soon be along to reclaim his estate and to continue to hold it in trust. After the Swami finishes the tale, one in the party, the lawyer Aspinwall (who is Carter's cousin), accuses Swami Chandraputra of telling a false tale in an attempt to steal the estate, claiming that he is some kind of conman in a disguise. As Aspinwall tears at the Swami's masklike face and beard, it is revealed that the Swami is not human at all, but Carter, still trapped in Zkauba's hideous body. The other witnesses don't see Carter/Zkauba's true face, but Aspinwall suffers a fatal heart attack. The crisis causes Zkauba's mind to reassert itself, and the alien wizard enters a curious, coffin-shaped clock (implied to be Carter/Zkauba's means of transport to Earth) and disappears.

The tale ends with a vague postscript, speculating that the Swami was merely a common criminal who hypnotized the others to escape. However, the postscript notes, some of the story's details seem eerily accurate.

== Inspiration ==
The story has its origins in Price's enthusiasm for an earlier Lovecraft tale. "One of my favorite HPL stories was, and still is, 'The Silver Key'," Price wrote in a 1944 memoir. "In telling him of the pleasure I had had in rereading it, I suggested a sequel to account for [protagonist] Randolph Carter's doings after his disappearance." After convincing an apparently reluctant Lovecraft to agree to collaborate on such a sequel, Price wrote a 6,000-word draft in August 1932; in April 1933, Lovecraft produced a 14,000-word version that left unchanged, by Price's estimate, "fewer than fifty of my original words," though An H. P. Lovecraft Encyclopedia reports that Lovecraft "kept as many of Price's conceptions as possible, as well as some of his language." Thus many of the central ideas of the story like 'Umr at-Tawil, the talk of mathematical planes and multiple facets of Randolph Carter throughout Time and Space come from Price, who was well read in neoplatonic thought, theosophy and the occult. Even the quote from the Necronomicon is mainly by Price in outline though put in more Lovecraftian language. The sub-plot about Yaddith was entirely Lovecraft's idea however. Hoffman Price's tales were oriental, and 'Umr at-Tawil was merely an Arab who had preternaturally long life in his draft.

In any case, Price was pleased with the result, writing that Lovecraft "was right of course in discarding all but the basic outline. I could only marvel that he had made so much of my inadequate and bungling start." The story appeared under both authors' bylines in the July 1934 issue of Weird Tales; Price's draft was published as "The Lord of Illusion" in Crypt of Cthulhu No. 10 in 1982 and is reprinted in Robert M. Price's anthology Tales of the Lovecraft Mythos. (Minneapolis, MN: Fedogan & Bremer, 1992, pp. 137–52).

Edward Guimont has proposed that an influence was Jack London's 1915 novel The Star Rover, which Lovecraft owned.

== Reception ==
Lovecraft scholar Will Murray says of "Through the Gates of the Silver Key", "As a Dunsanian fantasy, the Price/Lovecraft collaboration is a failure; as a Mythos story, it is rich with ideas, but curiously diluted." In A Thousand Plateaus (1980), Gilles Deleuze and Félix Guattari called the story one of Lovecraft's masterpieces.

== See also ==
- Brahman

== Sources ==
- Robert M. Price, editor, Black Forbidden Things.
