= An H. P. Lovecraft Encyclopedia =

2001 reference work by S. T. Joshi and David E. Schultz

- Cover of the first edition
- Authors: S. T. Joshi, David E. Schultz
- Language: English
- Subject: H. P. Lovecraft
- Publisher: Hippocampus Press
- Publication date: 2001
- Publication place: United States
- Media type: Print (Hardcover and Paperback)
- Pages: 364
- ISBN: 0313315787

An H. P. Lovecraft Encyclopedia is a reference work written by S. T. Joshi and David E. Schultz. It covers the life and work of American horror fiction writer H. P. Lovecraft. First published in 2001 by Greenwood Publishing Group, it was reissued in a slightly revised paperback edition by Hippocampus Press.

The book provides entries on all of Lovecraft's stories, complete with synopses, publication history and word counts. People from Lovecraft's life, including selected writers who influenced his work, are also included.

Fictional characters from Lovecraft's work are given brief entries, but most Cthulhu Mythos-related subjects are not referenced. "The 'gods' themselves, with rare exceptions, do not figure as 'characters' in any meaningful sense in the tales, so there are no entries on them," the authors explain.

== Authors ==
- S. T. Joshi is the author of Lovecraft: A Life and the editor of several collections of Lovecraft's work, including the corrected Arkham House editions.
- David E. Schultz is the editor of a critical edition of Lovecraft's Commonplace Book (1987). With Joshi, he has edited several volumes of writings by Lovecraft and Ambrose Bierce.
