= List of works influenced by the Cthulhu Mythos =

Cultural references to H. P. Lovecraft

This is a list of notable works influenced by elements of the shared fictional universe known as the Cthulhu Mythos, which originated in the works of American horror writer H. P. Lovecraft.

For collections of short stories that are not merely influenced by the Cthulhu Mythos, but are set within it and might be considered a part of it (or as forming a "Cthulhu Mythos genre"), see Cthulhu Mythos anthology.

For works that are stylistically Lovecraftian, including comics and film adaptations influenced by Lovecraft, see Lovecraftian horror.

== Novels and stories ==
Title	Author	Year	Notes
The Adventures of Samurai Cat	Mark E. Rogers	1984	The character Samurai Cat traverses time and space on a mission of revenge, and at one point wreaks havoc in H. P. Lovecraft's The Shadow Over Innsmouth.
Afterlife with Archie	Archie Horror	2014	A comic series in which Sacthubrina ends up at an otherworldly asylum run by "Dr. Lovecraft" after setting off the zombie apocalypse in the series. Due to her use of the Necronomicon she has inadvertently awakened Cthulhu, who intends for her to serve as his bride.
All-Consuming Fire	Andy Lane	1994	This Doctor Who Virgin New Adventures novel is set on a planet called Ry'leh and features an alien claiming to be Azathoth. It also equates several pre-existing Doctor Who monsters with Mythos creatures, claiming Fenric (from The Curse of Fenric) is Hastur, the Great Intelligence is Yog-Sothoth, and the Animus (from The Web Planet) is Lloigor.
And Another Thing...	Eoin Colfer	2009	The final installment in the Hitchhiker's Guide to the Galaxy series, and, in a humorous vignette, features Cthulhu interviewing for the position of god of the planet "Nano".
At the Mountains of Murkiness	Arthur C. Clarke	1940	It is a parody of H.P. Lovecraft's “At the Mountains of Madness”.
The Ballad of Black Tom	Victor LaValle	2016	Rework of "The Horror at Red Hook"
Book of the SubGenius and other SubGenius literature	J. R. "Bob" Dobbs and Church of the SubGenius	1983	Contains many references and allusions to the Cthulhu Mythos, such as identifying J.R. "Bob" Dobbs' real identity as Nyarlathotep and numerous mentions of the Elder Gods and Great Old Ones, who include SubGenius deities such as Jehovah 1 and the Discordian/SubGenius deity Eris Discordia, and mentioning Cthulhu as one of the common choices for a ShorDurPerSav (short-duration personal savior).
The Call of C'rruso	Mark Shaw, Laura Shaw and Flemming Andersen	2016	In Donald Duck #16, this Disney comics adventure story is a loose parody of the Cthulhu Mythos. Wannabe star singer Donald Duck is taken to the lost city of "Sp'too," where the many-eyed monster-god "Pf'legmwad" lies sleeping—with all of our world existing only as a part of his dream. "Mr. C'rruso", a humanlike manifestation of Pf'legmwad's mind, thinks that Donald's quacky singing voice will wake the monster up, as it eventually does.
The City We Became	N. K. Jemisin	2020	
A Colder War	Charles Stross	1997	A novella that blends the political fiction and technothriller genres with the Mythos.
Crouch End	Stephen King	1980	A short story concerning a young couple lost in the London suburb, featuring several references to the Mythos.
Dagon	Fred Chappell	1968	
Darkwing Duck	Ian Brill	2010	A story arc of the comic book series involves the criminal organization F.O.W.L. unleashing "Duckthulu", an obvious parody of Cthulhu.
Deep Roots	Ruthanna Emrys	2018	
Din of Celestial Birds	Brian Evenson	1997	Although this work does not contain direct references to the Cthulhu Mythos, it includes elements of psychological and Lovecraftian horror.
Discworld (series)	Terry Pratchett	1983–2015	Numerous allusions exist throughout the series; the most explicit of these is the Necrotelecomnicon, after Lovecraft's iconic Necronomicon grimoire.
The Dream-Quest of Vellitt Boe	Kij Johnson	2016	A novella set in the dreamlands and featuring an appearance by Raymond Carter, a former lover of the protagonist, in a subtly feminist re-imagining of Lovecraft's The Dream-Quest of Unknown Kadath.
The Dresden Files (series)	Jim Butcher	2000 -	Frequently alluded to throughout the series, in terms of the 'Outsiders', beings from beyond 'the Outer Gates' at the edge of reality and knowledge of them is eradicated wherever possible by the White Council of Wizards and the Venatori. One, He-Who-Walks-Behind, is an important part of the series' backstory. Several examples are explicitly included, such as a shoggoth and Cthulhu, the latter being referred to as 'the Sleeper' and having an active cult. Lovecraft himself is referenced.
Green Lama Unbound	Adam Lance Garcia	2010	The Green Lama, a pulp hero from the 1940s, battles Nazis as they attempt to raise Cthulhu. Features strong elements from the Mythos.
Good Omens	Terry Pratchett & Neil Gaiman	1990	Hastur appears as one of the Dukes of Hell.
The Horror from the Hills	Frank Belknap Long	1963	
I, Cthulhu	Neil Gaiman	1986	A short story on Gaiman's website featuring Cthulhu dictating an autobiography to a human slave.
The Illuminatus! Trilogy	Robert Anton Wilson and Robert Shea	1975	Features several Mythos references.
"Jerusalem's Lot"	Stephen King	1978	A short story published in 1978 as a part of the collection Night Shift. It serves as a prequel to 'Salem's Lot.
The Laundry Files	Charles Stross	2004–2018	Influenced by Lovecraft's visions of the future, and set in a world where a computer and the right mathematical equations is just as useful a toolset for calling up horrors from other dimensions as a spellbook and a pentagram on the floor.
Lovecraft Country	Matt Ruff	2016	
Move Under Ground	Nick Mamatas, Nightshade Books	2004	A pastiche of the work of Jack Kerouac, William S. Burroughs, Neal Cassady and other authors of the Beat Generation milieu, juxtaposed with the Cthulhu Mythos transposed into the late 50s/early 60s within California.
A Night in the Lonesome October	Roger Zelazny	1993	
Phantoms	Dean Koontz	1983	
Practical Demonkeeping; The Lust Lizard of Melancholy Cove; The Stupidest Angel	Christopher Moore	1992; 1999; 2004	Eggs Sothoth are a popular breakfast at HP's Cafe in Pine Cove, the setting of these and other Moore novels. The owner of HP's has been driven to drink by his encounters with supernatural creatures and other monsters.
The Sand Dwellers	Adam Niswander	1998	
Salem's Lot	Stephen King	1975	The original congregation of the town worships Yogsoggoth, as seen in the epilogue when the chapel at Salem's Lot is visited.
Soul Eater	Atsushi Ōkubo	2004	The Black Mass that resides within The Book of Eibon is most likely a nod to H. P. Lovecraft's Cthulhu.
The Spiraling Worm	David Conyers, John Sunseri	2007	
The Stand	Stephen King	1978	An evil sorcerer named Randall Flagg who has many aliases, including "Nyarlathotep".
"A Study in Emerald"	Neil Gaiman	2003	A Sherlock Holmes/Lovecraft cross-pastiche.
Unspeakable Vault (of Doom)	François Launet	2003 (launched)	A humorous web-comic strip featuring the Lovecraft deities and monsters. Anders Sandberg noted this comic as an example of the trend of poking fun at formerly horrifying concepts.
The Web of Easter Island	Donald Wandrei	1948	
What Stalks the Deep	Ursula Vernon	2025	
The Litany of Earth, Winter Tide, and Deep Roots.	Ruthanna Emrys	2017	The Mythos from the other side, told from the viewpoint of one of the survivors of Innsmouth's "disappearance".

== Comics ==
- Fall of Cthulhu (2007)
- Alan Moore's The Courtyard (2003) and the two sequels Neonomicon (2010) and Providence (2015–2017) are set in a Lovecration inspired universe.
- The Marvel Universe includes Lovecraftian horrors inspired by the Cthulhu mythos such as Shuma-Gorath, who is a part of the Many Angled ones.
- The DC Universe also includes Lovecraftian horrors such as Starro, Anti-Monitor, Nekron, and M'Nagalah.
- Spawn had some lovecraftion horrors like Urizen.
- The Hellboy Universe also had some Lovecraftian horrors like the Ogdru-Jahad and its offspring Ogdru-Hem.
- Witchblade and The Darkness feature the titular Darkness and its counterpart the Angeleus who mated to make the Witchblade.
- Leviathan, written by Ian Edginton and drawn by D'Israeli, published in 2000AD in 2003, tells of ship's architect William Ashbless who holds Hastur's soul imprisoned and uses it to power the huge ocean liner he has designed and built.
- Richard Corben's Neverwhere (1978) has a god Uhluhtc, Cthulhu spelled backwards.
- Elements of the Cthulhu mythos appear, or are mentioned, in several issues of the Teenage Mutant Ninja Turtles comic franchise, including TMNT Vol.1 #29, #42 and #43, and Tales of TMNT Vol.2 #45 (Mirage Studios); Teenage Mutant Ninja Turtles Adventures #27 (Archie Comics, 1991); and Infestation 2: Teenage Mutant Ninja Turtles #1 and #2 (IDW Publishing, 2012).
- The League of Extraordinary Gentlemen: Black Dossier includes an account of the League battling an invading "Great Old One" with the assistance of Bertie Wooster and Jeeves.
- H. P. Lovecraft and how he was inspired to create his creations are portrayed in the 2018 biographical comic book H. P. Lovecraft: He Who Wrote in the Darkness.

== Film ==
Films based on, or inspired by, the writings of H. P. Lovecraft include the following.

- The Haunted Palace (1963), directed by Roger Corman, starring Vincent Price, and with Lon Chaney Jr. Marketed as "Edgar Allan Poe's The Haunted Palace", the film is actually based on The Case of Charles Dexter Ward, and also includes elements taken from The Shadow over Innsmouth and "The Dunwich Horror".
- Die, Monster, Die! (1965), directed by Daniel Haller, and starring Boris Karloff and Nick Adams. An adaptation of "The Colour Out of Space".
- Curse of the Crimson Altar (1968), directed by Vernon Sewell, and starring Boris Karloff and Christopher Lee. Released in the U.S. as The Crimson Cult. Loosely based on "The Dreams in the Witch House".
- The Dunwich Horror (1970), directed by Daniel Haller, and starring Sandra Dee, Dean Stockwell, and Ed Begley. Based on the short story of the same name.
- Re-Animator (1985), directed by Stuart Gordon, and starring Jeffrey Combs, Bruce Abbott, Barbara Crampton, and David Gale. An adaptation of "Herbert West—Reanimator".
- From Beyond (1986), directed by Stuart Gordon, and starring Jeffrey Combs, Barbara Crampton, and Ken Foree. Based on the short story of the same name.
- The Curse (1987), directed by David Keith, and starring Wil Wheaton. Based on "The Colour Out of Space".
- The Unnamable (1988), directed by Jean-Paul Ouellette and starring Mark Kinsey Stephenson. Based on the short story of the same name.
- Bride of Re-Animator (1990), directed by Brian Yuzna and starring Jeffrey Combs, Bruce Abbott, Claude Earl Jones, David Gale, and Kathleen Kinmont. A sequel to Re-Animator, it is also based on "Herbert West—Reanimator".
- The Resurrected (1991), directed by Dan O'Bannon and starring John Terry, Jane Sibbett, and Chris Sarandon. Based on The Case of Charles Dexter Ward.
- Cast a Deadly Spell (1991), directed by Martin Campbell and starring Fred Ward, Julianne Moore, David Warner, and Clancy Brown. An original story that combines the Cthulhu mythos with a film noir detective mystery.
- The Unnamable II: The Statement of Randolph Carter (1992), directed by Jean-Paul Ouellette and starring Mark Kinsey Stephenson. The film combines story elements from "The Unnameable" and "The Statement of Randolph Carter".
- Necronomicon (1993), an anthology of three stories based on "The Rats in the Walls", "Cool Air", and The Whisperer in Darkness, with a framing story featuring a fictionalized H. P. Lovecraft.
- In the Mouth of Madness (1994), directed by John Carpenter and starring Sam Neill, Julie Carmen, and Jürgen Prochnow, the film is set in the Cthulhu Mythos but is not derived from any Lovecraft work. It explores insanity and the lines between reality and fantasy, much in the way that Lovecraft's 1936 novella At the Mountains of Madness does.
- Castle Freak (1995), directed by Stuart Gordon and starring Jeffrey Combs and Barbara Crampton. Inspired by "The Outsider".
- Cthulhu (2000), a low-budget Australian production directed by Damian Heffernan. It combines elements of the 1931 novella The Shadow over Innsmouth and the 1937 short story "The Thing on the Doorstep".
- Dagon (2001), directed by Stuart Gordon and starring Ezra Godden, Francisco Rabal, and Raquel Meroño. Based on The Shadow over Innsmouth.
- Beyond Re-Animator (2003), directed by Brian Yuzna and starring Jeffrey Combs, Jason Barry, and Elsa Pataky. The third movie of the Re-Animator trilogy, loosely based on "Herbert West—Reanimator".
- The Call of Cthulhu (2005), a silent black-and-white featurette designed to look like it was released in the late 1920s, when the short story "The Call of Cthulhu" was published.
- Cthulhu (2007), directed by Daniel Gildark, and starring Jason Cottle, Cara Buono, and Tori Spelling. Based on The Shadow over Innsmouth.
- The Last Lovecraft: Relic of Cthulhu (2009), directed by Henry Saine, and starring Kyle Davis. A comedy horror film, with an original story set amidst the Chulthu Mythos.
- The Whisperer in Darkness (2011), a black-and-white film designed to look like it was released in the 1930s. Based on the short story of the same name.
- Howard Lovecraft and the Frozen Kingdom (2016), Howard Lovecraft and the Undersea Kingdom (2017), and Howard Lovecraft and the Kingdom of Madness (2018) are animated movies that are based on graphic novels inspired by the writings of Lovecraft.
- Color Out of Space (2020), directed by Richard Stanley and starring Nicolas Cage. Based on "The Colour Out of Space".
- The Deep Ones (2020), an independent production directed by Chad Ferrin which provides an updated retelling of the 1931 Lovecraft novella The Shadow over Innsmouth.
- Suitable Flesh (2023), directed by Joe Lynch and starring Heather Graham, Judah Lewis, and Bruce Davison. Based on the 1937 Lovecraft short story "The Thing on the Doorstep".
- For the Gamera series, The "Konaka Gamera" script, one of two original plots for Gamera: Guardian of the Universe (1995) by Chiaki and Kazuya Konaka, took various inspirations from the mythos to have the appearances of ancient entities to affect the modern world. The director Shusuke Kaneko has repeatedly introduced concepts from the Lovecraft universe, and he participated in the production of The Cold from Necronomicon. Consequently, the "Konaka" Gamera script was reused into Gamera the Brave, Gamera Rebirth, Digimon Tamers, and Ultraman Tiga.
- Minions & Monsters (2026), an animated feature where the Minions summon a baby version of Cthulhu.

== Music ==
Artist	Album	Song	Notes
1349	Hellfire (2005)	"From the Deeps"	
The Acacia Strain	Continent (2008)	"Cthulhu"	Inspired by Lovecraft.
Adagio	Dominate (2005)	"R'lyeh the Dead"	Inspired by R'lyeh
Adam Beyer & Ida Engberg	The Color out of Space (2012)	"The Color out of Space", "Lovecraft"	
Arzachel	Arzachel (1969)	"Azathoth"	
Atlantean Kodex	The Pnakotic Demos (2010)	Various (all?)	Pnakotic refers to the "Pnakotic Manuscripts", the first fictional grimoire created by H. P. Lovecraft.
Bal-Sagoth	Atlantis Ascendant (2001)	"The Dreamer in the Catacombs of Ur"	Mentioned among others
Bal-Sagoth	The Chthonic Chronicles (2006)	"Shackled to the Trilithon of Kutulu"	
Black Sabbath	Black Sabbath (1970)	"Behind the Wall of Sleep"	The song's title and lyrics are inspired by a short story with a similar name.
Blind Idiot God	Various	Various	Name inspired by H. P. Lovecraft's description of Azathoth
Blue Öyster Cult	Curse of the Hidden Mirror (2001)	"The Old Gods Return"	"[...] Of a six eyed god whose wings beat; In a time so odd, so very odd; And we're all lost, all of us blessedly lost [...]"
Burzum	Burzum (1992)	"Ea, Lord of the Deeps"	Lyrics are taken directly from Necronomicon
Caravan	For Girls Who Grow Plump in the Night (1973)	"C'thlu Thlu"	"[...] Something seemed nearly dead making me feel so cold; Even the trees seemed to fear there was something unreal [...]"
Christian Muenzner	Beyond the Wall of Sleep (2014)	"Shadow Over Innsmouth", "Mountains of Madness", "Beyond the Wall of Sleep"	
Cradle of Filth	Midian (2000)	"Cthulhu Dawn"	
Cradle of Filth	Lovecraft & Witch Hearts (2002)		Compilation album. While aside from a mention or two, few of the included tracks seem to have any central reference to the Cthulhu Mythos, the album's intricate artwork was executed by graphic artist John Coulthard, who penned a graphic-arts version of Lovecraft's "The Call of Cthulhu" for 1995's The Starry Wisdom: Fiction Inspired by H. P. Lovecraft (Ed.D. M. Mitchell & Ramsay Campbell, Creation Books).
Cradle of Filth	Nymphetamine (2004)	"Mother of Abominations"	A continuation to Cthulhu Dawn from the Midian album.
Cradle of Filth	The Manticore and Other Horrors (2012)	"The Abhorrent", "Siding with the Titans"	As stated by Dani Filth in an interview, the two songs " extol tentacular Lovecraftian values".
Cloven Hoof	Resist or Serve (2014)	"Call of the Dark Ones"	"[...] Nameless terror from beneath the sea. In submerged cities waiting to be free [...]"
Code: Pandorum	The Lovecraftian Horrors (2017)	Various	
Crystal Eyes	Dead City Dreaming (2006)	"Dead City Dreaming"	Title and lyrics based on the sunken city R'Lyeh. "[...] In ruins aeons old beneath the sea, the Ancients long to be free. They lie dead and dreaming at this fallen site. [...]"
Dark Moor	Beyond the Sea (2005)	"Through the Gates of the Silver Key" (Intro), "The Silver Key"	These songs are based on the like-named short stories set in the Dreamlands of H.P. Lovecraft.
The Darkest of the Hillside Thickets	Various	Various	Many of the band's songs reference Lovecraft's work.
Deadmau5	4x4=12 (2010)	"Cthulhu Sleeps"	An eponymous instrumental.
Deadmau5	While(1<2) (2014)	"Rlyehs Lament"	
Death Breath	Stinking Up the Night (2006)	"Cthulhu Fhtagn!"	
Deathchain	Cult of Death (2007)	"Serpent of the Deep"	
Deicide	Legion (1992)	"Dead but Dreaming"	Describing implicitly Cthulhu's latent state, as well as the Elder Ones'
Dream Theater	Systematic Chaos (2007)	"The Dark Eternal Night"	Inspired by Lovecraft's prose-poem "Nyarlathotep", including several verbatim quotes
Dream Theater	Parasomnia (2025)	"The Shadow Man Incident"	Includes a spoken-word quote from "The Nameless City": "That is not dead which can eternal lie/And with strange eons, even death may die"
Electric Wizard	Supercoven (1998)	"Supercoven"	"[...] Yog Sothoth is the gate [...]"
Electric Wizard	Witchcult Today (2007)	"Dunwich"	
Entombed	Clandestine (1991)	"Stranger Aeons"	Lyrics mention "dreamquest," "lurking at the threshold," and "stranger things that eternal lie."
The Fall	Dragnet (1979)	"Spectre Vs. Rector"	"Yog Sothoth Ray Milland"
Glass Hammer	The Stories of H.P. Lovecraft - A Synphonic Collection (2012)	"Cool Air"	Part of an H.P. Lovecraft themed compilation album with contributions from several progressive rock bands.
The Gothic Archies	The Tragic Treasury: Songs from A Series of Unfortunate Events (2006)	"We Are the Gothic Archies"	"[...] Though gothic we are Archie, though Archie we are goth; No Satan-worshipers we, we worship Yog-Sothoth!"
Guy LeBlanc	The Stories of H.P. Lovecraft - A Synphonic Collection (2012)	"Beyond the Wall of Sleep"	Part of an H.P. Lovecraft themed compilation album with contributions from several progressive rock bands. Based on the H.P. Lovecraft short story with the same name.
Gwar	Scumdogs of the Universe (1990)	"Horror of Yig"	
Fields of the Nephilim	The Nephilim (1988)	"Last Exit for the Lost"	"[...] Between the spaces, along the wall; Appearing faces, that disappear at dawn; We're getting closer. I can see the door; Closer and closer; Kthulhu calls; Forever remain (x4)"
High on Fire	Blessed Black Wings (2005)	"The Face of Oblivion", "Cometh Down Hessian"	"The Face of Oblivion" is based on At the Mountains of Madness and "Cometh Down Hessian" is based on The Hound.
High on Fire	De Vermis Mysteriis (2015)	"De Vermis Mysteriis"	De Vermis Mysteriis is a fictional grimoire created by Robert Bloch and incorporated by H. P. Lovecraft into the lore of the Cthulhu Mythos.
High on Fire	Luminiferous (2015)	"Carcosa"	The song is based on the fictional extraterrestrial city "Carcosa", created by Ambrose Bierce, and later associated with the Cthulhu Mythos.
H. P. Lovecraft	H. P. Lovecraft (1967); H. P. Lovecraft II (1968)	Various	A 1960s band named for the author, with song content reflecting Lovecraft's works.
Iced Earth	Plagues of Babylon (2014)	"Cthulhu"	
Ice Nine Kills	The Silver Scream 2: Welcome to Horrorwood (2014)	"Ex-Mortis"	Based on The Evil Dead & the Necronomicon
Krypts	Unending Degradation (2013)	"Dormancy of the Ancients"	
Legion of the Damned	Cult of the Dead (2008)	"Black Wings of Yog-Sothoth"	
Manilla Road	Spiral Castle (2002)	"Spiral Castle"	"[...]Yog Sothoth has come; And the ancient ones"
The Men That Will Not Be Blamed For Nothing	This May Be The Reason Why The Men That Will Not Be Blamed For Nothing Cannot Be Killed By Conventional Weapons	"Margate Fhtagn"	A story of a Victorian family going on a seaside holiday to Margate, which gets interrupted by Cthulhu's rising from the sea.
Mercyful Fate	Time (1994)	"The Mad Arab"	
Mercyful Fate	Into the Unknown (1996)	"Kutulu (The Mad Arab Part Two)"	
Metallica	Ride the Lightning (1984)	"The Call of Ktulu"	An instrumental inspired by "The Call of Cthulhu".
Metallica	Master of Puppets (1986)	"The Thing That Should Not Be"	Lovecraft-inspired, alludes to The Shadow over Innsmouth--"hybrid children watch the sea, pray for father roaming free"—and the rhyming couplet "The Nameless City"--"not dead which eternal lie, in stranger eons death might die". "
Metallica	Death Magnetic (2008)	"All Nightmare Long"	Described by vocalist James Hetfield as being about the Hounds of Tindalos.
Metallica	Hardwired... to Self-Destruct (2016)	"Dream No More"	"[...]Cthulhu, awaken[...]"
Morbid Angel	Altars of Madness (1989)	"Lord of all Fevers and Plague"	Mentions 'Cthulhu' among other non-Lovecraftian entities.
Morbid Angel	Blessed Are the Sick (1991)	"The Ancient Ones"	
Morbid Angel	Covenant (1993)	"Angel of Disease"	
NanowaR of Steel	Stairway to Valhalla (2018)	"The Call of Cthulhu"	Comedy metal song about Cthulhu running an evil call center.
Necromantia	Black Arts Lead to Everlasting Sins E.P. (1992)	"The Feast of Ghouls", "De Magia Veterum"	"The Feast of Ghouls" is based on concepts from The R'lyeh Text: Hidden Leaves of the Necronomicon. "De Magia Veterum" is based partly on The Call of Cthulhu and partly on the Simon Necronomicon.
Necromantia	Crossing the Fiery Path (1993)	"The Warlock"	The Necronomicon, the Book of Eibon and De Vermis Mysteriis are referenced among other "forbidden" magical grimoires.
Necromantia	From The Past We Summon Thee E.P. (1994)	"Faceless Gods"	A song influenced by the Cthulhu Mythos and the Simon Necronomicon.
Necromantia	The Sound of Lucifer Storming Heaven (2007)	"For the Elder Magi: I-Eibon the Necromancer", "Architecture Of Exquisite Madness"	"For the Elder Magi: I-Eibon the Necromancer" is about Eibon, a figure created by Robert E. Howard and often used by H. P. Lovecraft and other Cthulhu Mythos authors. "Architecture Of Exquisite Madness" is about the Church of Starry Wisdom and describes the Non-Euclidean Geometry often referenced in H. P. Lovecraft's works.
Necromantia	People of the Sea E.P. (2008), ...For The Temple Of The Serpent Skull... split E.P. with Acherontas (2008)	"People of the Sea"	A song about the Deep Ones.
Nexus	The Stories of H.P. Lovecraft - A Synphonic Collection (2012)	"The Colour Out of Space"	Part of an H.P. Lovecraft themed compilation album with contributions from several progressive rock bands. Based on H. P. Lovecraft's short story with the same name.
Nile	Various	Various	Nile have written several songs about the Cthulhu mythos. Vocalist and guitarist Karl Sanders claimed Lovecraft's works were in harmony with the essence of death metal.
Ningen Isu	Ougon no Yoake (Golden Dawn) (1992)	"Kyouki Sanmyaku" (At the Mountains of Madness)	
Ningen Isu	Taihai Geijutsu Ten (Degenerate Art Exhibition) (1998)	"Dunwich no Kai" (The Dunwich Horror)	
Ningen Isu	Mandoro (Ten Thousand Garden Lanterns) (2013)	"Jikan kara no Kage" (The Shadow Out of Time)	
Ningen Isu	Utsushiyo wa Yume (This World Is A Dream) (2014)	"Uchuu kara no Iro" (The Colour out of Space)	
Nox Arcana	Necronomicon (2004)	(all songs)	An album entirely about the Cthulhu Mythos.
Opeth	Heritage (2011)	"Pyre"	The lyrics contain references to the short story "Beyond the Wall of Sleep"
Orange Goblin	A Eulogy for the Damned (2012)	"Red Tide Rising"	"[...] Gods are descending, a force unrelenting. Cthulhu will rise from the sea. [...]"
Persuader	The Fiction Maze (2013)	"Heathen", "Dagon Rising"	
Portal	Various	Various	This obscure Australian Black/Death band is heavily inspired by Lovecraft's works lyrically, visually, and musically.
Rage	Trapped! (1992)	"Beyond the Wall of Sleep"	
Rage	The Missing Link (1993)	"Lost in the Ice"	
Rage	Black in Mind (1995)	"The Crawling Chaos", "Shadow Out of Time", "In a Nameless Time"	
Rage	Soundchaser (2003)	"Great Old Ones"	
Revocation	"Deathless" (2014)	"Madness Opus", "The Blackest Reaches"	The first song is based on "The Music of Erich Zann", the second song is based on "The Haunter of the Dark".
Revocation	"The Outer Ones" (2018)	"Of Unworldly Origin", That Which Consumes All Things", "The Outer Ones"	The album is generally inspired by Lovecraft. Of Unworldly Origin mentions Shub-Niggurath, That Which Consumes All Things is based on "The Colour Out of Space", The Outer Ones refers to The Outer Gods in the Cthulhu Mythos.
Rotting Christ	Passage to Arcturo (1991)	"The Forest of N'Gai", "Inside the Eye of Algond"	The two songs contain references to several Great Old Ones (Azathoth, Tsathoggua, Ithaqua etc.), as well as locations from Cthulhu Mythos and Dream Cycle locations (Innsmouth, Carcosa, Kandath etc.).
Rudimentary Peni	Cacophony (1988)	(all 30 songs)	An album consisting entirely of songs that reference (either directly or indirectly) both Lovecraft's personal life and his literary works (mainly the Cthulhu Mythos).
Saille	Ritu (2013)	"Fhtagn"	A slow, ritualistic song based on "The Call of Cthulhu" from a cultist's perspective.
Samael	Worship Him (1992)	"Rite of Cthulhu"	
Septicflesh	Mystic Places of Dawn (1994)	"Mystic Places of Dawn"	The city of Sarnath from the short story "The Doom that Came to Sarnath" is referenced among Atlantis, Lemuria and other mythical sunken or destroyed cities.
Septicflesh	Communion (2008)	"Lovecraft's Death"	The song's lyrics are an amalgam of various Cthulhu Mythos story titles, including "The Call of Cthulhu", "The Whisperer in Darkness", "The Music of Erich Zann" and others.
Septicflesh	Codex Omega (2017)	"Our Church, Below the Sea"	Inspired by the Cult of Cthulhu and its beliefs, referenced in "The Call of Cthulhu", as well as the cult of the Deep Ones from The Shadow Over Innsmouth
Seven Kingdoms	Decennium (2017)	"In the Walls"	Inspired by H.P. Lovecraft's short story "The Rats in the Walls."
Shub-Niggurath	Le Morts Vont Vite and other albums	"Yog Sothoth" and other tracks	Avant-rock/zeuhl band from France which received acclaim for its development of Magma's sound. Several tracks are explicitly Cthulhu Mythos-inspired, and the name of the band is a Cthulhu Mythos deity.
Sulphur Aeon	Various	Various	Their whole discography is based on Cthulhu Mythos, with each album having a different deity as its main subject (although not exclusively): Swallowed By the Ocean's Tide is about Cthulhu, Gateway To the Antishphere is mostly about Azagthoth and The Scythe of Cosmic Chaos is centered around Nyarlahotep
Thergothon	Stream from the Heavens (1994) and "Fhtagn-Nagh Yog Sothoth" demo (1991)	Various songs	Thergothon's entire catalog is rife with Lovecraftian lyrical reference and atmospheric inspiration.
Therion	Beyond Sanctorum (1992)	"Cthulhu"	Inspired by H. P. Lovecraft's work.
The Vision Bleak	Carpathia - A Dramatic Poem (2005)	"Kutulu!"	Many of the band's songs are inspired by classic horror novels and films, including H. P. Lovecraft's work.
Zardonic	Lovecraft Machine	"Cthulhu"	The first track of this release is named after Cthulhu.
John Zorn	Magick (2004)	Tracks 1-5: "Conjurations", "The Magus", "Thought Forms", "Incunabula", and "Asmodeus"	These 5 tracks combine to form a work called "Necronomicon"

== Television ==
Title	Notes
30 Coins	Inspired by the works of H.P. Lovecraft and the Call of Cthulhu roleplaying game; incorporating elements such as the Elder Sign and designs of outer gods such as Nyarlathotep.
A.N.T. Farm	In "performANTS," Sunshine, an employee at a store where Chyna and her friends to go, tells Cameron that she meditates to "Cthulhu, Dark Lord of the Underworld". She later mistakes Angus, dressed as OctoPanda, for Cthulhu. Angus tricks her in believing he is and demands macarons, which he did not get in the green room of the store.
Ben 10: Ultimate Alien	The main antagonist of the third season, Dagon, is loosely based on Dagon and Cthulhu.
Bungo Stray Dogs	A character in the organization the Guild is named H. P. Lovecraft and holds an ability called "The Old One".
Cast a Deadly Spell (1991)	TV movie. The movie is very much an homage to the works of H. P. Lovecraft. Though not based on any one particular story by Lovecraft, the film features many Lovecraftian tropes, and can be considered to take place against the unified backdrop which has come to be known as the Cthulhu Mythos. The nightclub is called Harry Bordon's Dunwich Room. Frequent references are made to the Necronomicon, the Great Old Ones, Cthulhu and Yog-Sothoth throughout the film.
Chilling Adventures of Sabrina	Part 3 of the series contains a number of influences from the Cthulhu Mythos. References to the Old Ones and "Eldritch Terrors" (a term often used by H. P. Lovecraft to describe Cthulhu Mythos deities) are used throughout the season. In the episode "Chapter Twenty-Two: Drag Me to Hell", Father Blackwood summons a Deep One, offering his two children as blood sacrifice and is given a mystical egg containing a fish-like embryo. The main antagonist is a leader of a group of Pagans and uses the pseudonym "Carcosa" (a name used in stories by Ambrose Bierce, as well as The King in Yellow by Robert W. Chambers); he is later revealed to be the Great God Pan. The Old Ones, referred to as the "Eldritch Terrors" are the main antagonists of Part 4. A total of eight Eldritch Terrors appear in the series; although they are not directly named after any deities from the Cthulhu Mythos, they adopt many of their characteristics. One of the season's minor antagonists, Father Blackwood, establishes a church worshipping the Eldritch Terrors using the pseudonym "Reverend Lovecraft". H.P. Lovecraft himself is referenced as a writer of weird fiction, as well as a source of information for The Weird, an Eldritch Terror with features similar to Cthulhu. In the same episode, the town of Innsmouth is also mentioned. The final episode of the series is titled At the Mountains of Madness (after the novella of the same name) and takes place on the eponymous location.
Dark Shadows	Episodes 885 to 980 of the Gothic soap opera, a storyline commonly known as 'The Leviathans', was inspired by the Cthulhu Mythos.
Digimon	At the end of Episode 13 of Adventure 02, "The Call of Dagomon", the silhouette of Dagomon appears rising from the sea, bearing a striking resemblance to Cthulhu. In the same episode, Digimoji (a fictional alphabet featured in the Digimon franchise) translating to Ph'nglui mglw'nafh Cthulhu R'lyeh wgah'nagl fhtagn and Innsmouth appears. The title of this episode, ダゴモンの呼び声 ("Dagomon no Yobigoe"), is a reference to "The Call of Cthulhu". The aforementioned "Konaka Gamera" script served as a basis for Digimon Tamers.
Doctor Who	In the episode "The Snowmen", an evil being known as "The Great Intelligence" (also known as "Yog-Sothoth" and voiced by Ian McKellen) has been possessing a 19th-century London doctor named Walter Simeon (played by Richard E. Grant) since his childhood, even after his death. The classic serials: "The Seeds of Doom," "Pyramids of Mars" & "Image of the Fendahl" also have much work inspired by Lovecraftian writings.
Earthworm Jim	In one episode, Evil the Cat summons the Nameless Beast in an attempt to destroy the universe, alluding to "The Nameless City".
Fanboy & Chum Chum	Though no allusion to Cthulhu or any of the Lovecraftian gods are made, a talking version of the Necronomicon is utilized by the aspiring young wizard Kyle Bloodworth-Thomason as a regular grimoire.
Fate/Zero	Caster can summon monsters with the chant Cthulhu fhtagn, and in Episode 13, Caster summons a giant sea monster by chanting Ph'nglui mglw'nafh wgah'nagl fhtagn.
The Grim Adventures of Billy & Mandy	The season 1 episode "Big Trouble in Billy's Basement" and the season 5 episode "Prank Call of Cthulhu" feature Yog-Sothoth and Cthulhu, respectively.
Helluva Boss	In Season 2, Episode 2 "Seeing Stars" the central plot of this episode focuses on Stolas taking his daughter, Octavia, to view a meteor shower that occurs once every thousand years. Stolas refers to this cosmic event as "Azathoth’s Tears," the condensed and crystallized hopes of every living thing that never came to be.
Housing Complex C	The series makes reference to the mythos, with "Yyrg-Sorhoth" being called upon for protection, and with worshippers of a Cthulhu-esque deity arriving
Haiyore! Nyaruko-san	The entire light novel series was based on the Cthulhu Mythos, for it features many of Lovecraft's characters such as Nyarlathotep (depicted in girl form under the name of Nyaruko). Despite the fact that the series has been based on the Mythos, it is a humor/parody series that makes references to a lot of different media.
House	Season 6, Episode 18, "Knight Fall", features the Necronomicon, predominantly as a plot piece.
Justice League	The episode "The Terror Beyond" has the creature Icthultu, inspired by Cthulhu, as the main antagonist.
The Librarians	The episode "And the Cost of Higher Education" takes place at Wexler University, a fictional college that Lovecraft used as the inspiration for Miskatonic University. A student named Lucy accidentally summons an entity referred to as the Hydra-Stat, which appears as a large octopus and devours people engaged in displays of hubris or ego.
Lovecraft Country	Lovecraft Country is a 2020 limited-run series produced by HBO. Based on the novel of the same name, it is set in the 1950s. It tells the story of several characters who take a road trip and end up confronting Lovecraftian monsters, along with the racism of the Jim Crow era.
Mobile Suit Gundam GQuuuuuuX	In episode 10 of the series, the Yomagn'tho is a "Solar Ray device" used as a weapon of mass destruction. Yomagn'tho is a direct reference to an Outer God from the works of H.P. Lovecraft, reinforcing the cosmic horror and uncontrollable power themes in the series.
Musaigen no Phantom World	In episode 8 of the series, Haruhiko summons Cthulhu using a spell called Abramelin's Finger in order to defeat an evil primate.
Overlord	In the episode "Massacre", Ainz Ooal Gown utilizes "Super Tier Magic" to kill 70,000 opposing army troops in a spell called "Iä! Shub-Niggurath!". The bodies are sacrificed and used as tribute to summon five massive goat monsters called "The Dark Young" (whose appearance is identical to "The Dark Young" of the Shub-Niggurath mythos).
The Real Ghostbusters	The episode "The Collect Call of Cathulhu" references the Necronomicon and an attempt to revive the so-called "Cathulhu", described as one of the "Great Old Ones". Lovecraft is also mentioned by name. The Old Ones were again mentioned in the episode "Russian About".
Rick and Morty	The show's opening title sequence features a huge Cthulhu-like creature chasing the titular characters, who appear to have stolen its baby.
Rod Serling's Night Gallery	The season 2 episodes "Pickman's Model" and "Cool Air" are based on the original 1926 Lovecraft short stories of the same name, while "Professor Peabody's Last Lecture" heavily references the Mythos.
Scooby-Doo! Mystery Incorporated	The episodes "The Shrieking Madness" and "Pawn of Shadows" guest-star Professor H. P. Hatecraft, author of otherworldly horror stories, whose name is a play on Lovecraft's. Mythos symbolism abounds, and Hatecraft's character Char Gar Gothakon closely resembles Cthulhu. In the series finale, the gang is invited to attend Miskatonic University.
South Park	Features Cthulhu as a character in the 2010 season 14 3-episode saga "Coon 2: Hindsight", "Mysterion Rises", and "Coon vs. Coon and Friends", along with the sunken city of R'lyeh, with many mentions of the Cthulhu Mythos, the Goth kids at South Park being revealed to be members of the Cult of Cthulhu and the reason for Kenny McCormick's constant death and resurrection being a ritual Kenny's parents did when Kenny's mom was first pregnant with Kenny and they joined the Cult of Cthulhu.
Super Robot Monkey Team Hyperforce Go!	The cosmic-scale antagonists of the show are inspired by the Lovecraftian mythos, with a Cthulhu Expy that's revealed to be the eye of Skeleton King (the main villain of the show) whose plan is to release the "Dark Ones", the show's equivalent of the Great Old Ones to cause a universal apocalypse as their emissary makes him the setting's equivalent of Nyarlathotep. The title of season 2's episode "Shadow Over Shuggazoom" directly homages Shadow Over Innsmouth.
Supernatural	In season 6, episode 21 "Let it Bleed", Lovecraft and six others performed a ritual to pierce the veil between worlds, opening a door into Purgatory on March 10, 1937. A creature of Purgatory came through and killed Lovecraft a few days later on March 15. In season 7, it would become clear that the 'Old Ones' of the Cthulhu Mythos are Leviathans, which were the first beings created by God before being locked into Purgatory so that they would not be a threat to later creations.
Teenage Mutant Ninja Turtles	In the Season 3 episode "The Darkness Within", the Turtles confront a Cthulhu-like alien monster underneath Manhattan.
True Detective	Hastur is vaguely mentioned as the "Yellow King" and Carcosa is also featured.
Ultraman Tiga	Ultraman Tiga and other Giants of Light were once the protectors of an "Ultra Ancient Civilization" of humans that inhabited the City of Ry'leh before Ghatanothoa emerged and destroyed it. Ghatanothoa serves as the final enemy of the series, with a Lloigor inspired kaiju named Zoiger serving as a sign of their reawakening.

== Tabletop games ==
Game title	Publisher/Developer	Year	Notes
Arkham Horror	Chaosium; Fantasy Flight Games	1987; 2005	A board game originally published by Chaosium. This game is based on roleplaying game Call of Cthulhu. The license was later acquired by Fantasy Flight Games, with a revised and expanded version of the game re-released in 2005.
Call of Cthulhu	Chaosium	1981	Award-winning role-playing game based on the Mythos.
Call of Cthulhu Collectible Card Game	Fantasy Flight Games	2004	Collectible card game based on the Mythos.
Chez Cthulhu			A Chez Geek (by Steve Jackson Games) variant where slackers may descend into Lovecraftian madness.
Delta Green	Pagan Publishing Arc Dream Publishing	1997 2016	A Call of Cthulhu sourcebook and later its own standalone game. The Player Characters are members of a secret organization inside the US Government named Delta Green, which fights against creatures from the Mythos and conspiracies related to them.
Cthulhu Fluxx	Looney Labs	2012	An H. P. Lovecraft-themed variant of the original Fluxx game, including cards based on some of the characters, objects and events in the Cthulhu Mythos.
Cthulhu Gloom			A spin-off of the card game Gloom, wherein players are given a family of Lovecraftian characters. The goal of the game is for the players to kill their own characters in horribly terrifying deaths for negative points, while keeping their opponents' families healthy and happy. All of the cards in the game contain references to Lovecraftian themes, places and characters.
Cthulhu Dice	Steve Jackson Games	2010	A dice game with a custom 12-sided die, embossed with tentacles, Elder Signs and more. Players roll the dice in an attempt to destroy their opponent's "sanity".
Cthulhu: Death May Die	CMON	2019	A cooperative board game based on the Cthulhu Mythos. To prevent the ritual that will awaken the Old Ones, players must battle cults, monsters, and even the Old Ones themselves.
Dungeons & Dragons	TSR, Inc.	1980	Games company TSR included an entire chapter on the Cthulhu Mythos (including statistics for the character) in the first printing of Dungeons & Dragons sourcebook Deities & Demigods (1980). TSR, however, were unaware that Arkham House - copyright holder on almost all Lovecraft literature - had already licensed the Cthulhu property to the game company Chaosium. Although Chaosium stipulated that TSR could continue to use the material if each future edition featured a published credit to Chaosium, TSR refused and the material was removed from all subsequent editions.
Elder Sign	Fantasy Flight Games	2011	A dice game involving a team of investigators attempting to prevent the "Ancient Ones" from awakening. Also, a mobile App Game with the same goal.
Illuminati			A card game with an expansion supplement, "Servants of Cthulhu".
Magic: The Gathering	Wizards of the Coast		In the set Rise of the Eldrazi, the size and descriptions of the Eldrazi are partially based on the Cthulhu Mythos. In the set Shadows over Innistrad, the plot of the stories as well as the set's name alludes to Shadows over Innsmouth.
Mansions of Madness	Fantasy Flight Games	2011	Board game involving one player in the service of malevolent deities and other players attempting to stop them.
Monsterpocalypse	Privateer Press	2008 -	A tactical board game pitting giant monsters against each other. One of the factions is the Lords of Cthul, a Lovecraft-inspired Fiends faction from another dimension.
Munchkin	Steve Jackson Games	2001	A card game includes a series of parody expansion sets Munchkin Cthulhu inspired by the Cthulhu Mythos.
Mythos	Chaosium	1996 - 1997	Collectible card game based in the Lovecraft mythos setting and spanning the 1920s era, dreamlands and modern times via expansions. Players were investigators attempting to complete adventures and not drop to zero sanity.
Pathfinder Roleplaying Game	Paizo Publishing	2009	A spin-off of the 3.5 Edition of Dungeons and Dragons, Pathfinder includes several of the Outer Gods and Great Old Ones as deities that can be served by player or non-player characters. They are said to inhabit and are associated with the "Dark Tapestry", the endless dark void between the stars. The adventure path Strange Aeons involves the Cthulhu Mythos as the primary antagonists.
Starfinder Roleplaying Game	Paizo Publishing	2017	A spin-off to Pathfinder set in the far future of that setting has more apparitions of the mythos. Nyarlathotep is in the pantheon as a major evil god, the "Elder Mythos cult" are a minor antagonist faction, and the Pluto-equivalent "Aucturn" is stated to be an egg of a Great Old One.
Trail of Cthulhu	Pelgrane Press	2008	An investigative role-playing game. A remake of Call of Cthulhu using the Gumshoe System.
Yu-Gi-Oh! Trading Card Game	Konami	1996	The card game introduced a series of monsters called the "Entity" monsters that directly relate to the creatures of the Cthulhu Mythos deities.

== Video games ==
Game title	Publisher/Developer	Year	Notes
Abathor	Pow Pixel Games/ JanduSoft	2024	Hack and slash action platformer game inspired by the works of H. P. Lovecraft.
Alone in the Dark	Infogrames, PC	1992	Survival horror game inspired by the works of H. P. Lovecraft.
Alone in the Dark	Pieces Interactive	2024	Survival horror game inspired by the works of H. P. Lovecraft and primarily featuring both Nyarlathotep and Shub-Niggurath as antagonists.
Anchorhead	Michael Gentry	1998	Text adventure game inspired by the works of H. P. Lovecraft.
Arcaea	lowiro	2017	The character of Saya, from the Absolute Reason DLC is named for (and takes subtle design cues from) Cyäegha, a Great Old One. One of the songs in Absolute Reason is named Cyaegha, cementing this connection. The plot of Absolute Reason (and its sequel Absolute Nihil) deals with themes of nihilism and existential dread. In the story, Saya impersonates a woman named after Lavinia Whateley, a character from The Dunwich Horror.
Black Souls II	Eeny, meeny, miny, moe?	2018	Psychological horror game inspired by H. P. Lovecraft's Cthulhu Mythos.
Bloodborne	From Software	2015	An action role-playing game on the PlayStation 4 that is heavily influenced by the Cthulhu Mythos featuring characters and supernatural beings directly based on those found in the works of H. P. Lovecraft
Call of Cthulhu	Cyanide	2018	Survival horror role-playing game based on the short story and the 1981 role-playing game of the same title.
Call of Cthulhu: Dark Corners of the Earth	Bethesda Softworks/2K Games, Xbox/Microsoft Windows	2005	Loosely based on The Shadow over Innsmouth, with references to other Mythos works.
Call of Cthulhu: The Wasted Land	Chaosium / Red Wasp Design	2012	Strategy / Role-playing game developed by Chaosium, publishers of the Call of Cthulhu role-playing game. The story is set during World War I and bases some on its narrative on the novella Herbert West–Reanimator.
Call of Duty: Black Ops III	Treyarch	2015	The Shadow Man, a character in the Shadows of Evil Easter egg is revealed to be a manifestation of Cthulhu. The setting and gameplay itself is inspired by the Mythos.
Call of the Sea (video game)	Out of the Blue	2020	Adventure / Puzzle game inspired by various Cthulhu mythos. A story about an expedition, mysterious underwater beings and deities, with Cthulhian architecture on the island and references to The Shadow over Innsmouth, The Call of Cthulhu, Charles Dexter Ward and Miskatonic University.
Conarium	Zoetrope Interactive	2017	Inspired by the novella At the Mountains of Madness.
Cthulhu Chronicles	MetaArcade	2018	A campaign of several interactive fiction adventures for mobile platforms, based on the Call of Cthulhu role-playing game.
Cthulhu Saves the World	Zeboyd Games	2010	A 2D role-playing video game where Cthulhu must become a hero to recover his dark powers.
The Council	Focus Home Interactive	2018	An episodic adventure game with role-playing elements. The game's plot is centered around the search for the stolen magical grimoire Al Azif (the original name of the Necronomicon), as well as the existence or primordial, demonic entities that have manipulated mankind throughout its history, with features akin to those of the Elder Gods and the Great Old Ones.
Danganronpa V3: Killing Harmony	Spike Chunsoft	2017	The Necronomicon appears as the game's third motive and is described as being able to resurrect the dead.
Darkest Dungeon	Red Hook Studios	2015	A Roguelike dungeon crawler where the player manages a group of heroes reclaiming an estate where a heavily Cthulhu-themed Old One has awakened and drove the residents mad. The player must not only make sure his group survives but also take care of their sanity and stress levels.
Destiny: The Taken King	Bungie	2015	Two of the raid bosses, Golgoroth and Oryx, are loosely based upon the Mythos characters Gol-Goroth and Orryx, respectively.
Dredge	Black Salt Games	2023	The game follows a fisherman who encounters increasingly Lovecraftian creatures as he ventures out further into an open world archipelago.
The Elder Scrolls series	Bethesda	1994 - Current	The Daedric Prince Hermaeus Mora has some Lovecraftian elements in his design and philosophy, and it can be argued that he shares a similar appearance to Yog-Sothoth. One quest in The Elder Scrolls IV: Oblivion is based on "The Shadow over Innsmouth".
Eternal Darkness: Sanity's Requiem	Silicon Knights	2002	A GameCube game inspired by Lovecraft's writings. The game is set in Rhode Island where the main character finds a tome with stories of Cthulhu-like 'ancients'. The game won the honorary "Day of the Tentacle (Cthulhu) Award" at GameSpy's Game of the Year Awards.
Etrian Odyssey III: The Drowned City	Atlus	2010	A dungeon-crawler role-playing game that draws heavily on the Cthulhu Mythos. The optional final boss, the Abyssal God, bears a heavy resemblance to Cthulhu, and its minions are known as the Deep Ones.
Fallen London	Failbetter Games	2009	A browser based role playing game set in a subterranean world influenced by Lovecraftian themes.
Fate/Grand Order	Delight Works	2015	A role-playing mobile game that features characters influenced by the Mythos. The characters under the Foreigner class channel the powers of Outer Gods, currently including Abigail Williams (Yog-Sothoth), Katsushika Hokusai (Cthulhu), Yang Guifei (Cthugha), Van Gogh (Vulthoom), Jacques de Molay (Shub Niggurath), and franchise-original character BB (Nyarlathotep).
Fallout 3: Point Lookout	Bethesda	2008	Bethesda's take on Interplay's "Post-Apocalyptic Role Playing Game" features a minor location in the Capital Wasteland, the Dunwich Building, which references loosely the short story "The Dunwich Horror". Included in the "Point Lookout" DLC is a quest inspired by the Mythos through a mysterious man's attempts to recover a doomed book.
Fallout 4	Bethesda	2015	The game, set in post-apocalyptic Boston, Massachusetts, features a location named "Pickman's Gallery" and an associated side-quest, inspired by "Pickman's Model". Another location in the game called Dunwich Borers references the Dunwich Building in Fallout 3.
Forgive Me Father	Byte Barrel	2022	A first person shooter set in the New England town of Pestisville. The game makes many references to the Cthulhu mythos, and includes the deity as its final boss.
Hearthstone: Whispers of the Old Gods	Blizzard	2016	Blizzard released an expansion on 31 May 2016, "Whispers of The Old Gods". This expansion's theme is largely themed around the 'Old Gods' from the Warcraft franchise, which are inspired by the Cthulhu Mythos.
Hearthstone: Madness at the Darkmoon Faire	Blizzard	2020	Blizzard released an expansion on 17 November 2020, "Madness at the Darkmoon Faire". This expansion's theme has returning elements and characters from Whispers of the Old Gods, but now with elements of carnivals and circuses mixed in.
Identity V	NetEase Games	2018	Three hunters from the game come from Cthulhu Mythos. Hastur, or "The Feaster", Yidhra, "The Dream Witch", and Ithaqua, "Night Watch" are all based on the fictional deities of the same names.
Iru!	Soft Machine, Takara	1998	Set on an island where a group of individuals try to summon Cthulu.
King's Quest VI: Heir Today, Gone Tomorrow	Sierra On-Line	1992	The main antagonist of the game is Abdul Alhazred, a magician and author of the Necronomicon.
Life is Strange	Dontnod Entertainment	2015	An episodic graphic adventure. Although the plot is not directly connected to the Cthulhu Mythos, the game features a number of pop culture references and Easter eggs. Episode Four contains a reference to a H. West Miskatonic University in Bolton, alluding both to the fictional Miskatonic University and to the novella Herbert West–Reanimator by H. P. Lovecraft.
Lost Souls		1990	Online game with direct references to the Mythos.
Magicka	Paradox Interactive	2011	An action-adventure video game, featuring Cthulhu-themed expansion "The Stars are Left". Also there are several Mythos-themed enemies and bosses in the vanilla game.
Magrunner: Dark Pulse	Frogwares	2013	A puzzle video game involving magnetism, leading to a world with Lovecraftian-inspired monsters, including Cthulhu.
Megami Tensei	Atlus	1987 -	A series of Japanese role-playing games featuring creatures and figures from various mythologies, including beings from the Mythos. They serve varying roles throughout the games, sometimes as enemies, sometimes as recruitable allies. In particular, Nyarlathotep serves as the chief antagonist for Shin Megami Tensei: Persona and the Persona 2 series. In Persona 5, the Necronomicon appears as Futaba Sakura's initial persona. In Persona 5 Royal, Azathoth appears as the persona of Takuto Maruki.
My Singing Monsters	Big Blue Bubble	2012-	Shellbeat, the Quad-Elemental of Water Island, resembles Cthulhu. Even one of its nicknames is "Thulhu," shared by Nebulob. Another one is Psychic Island's Titan, dubbed Cruv'laapht, named after H.P. Lovecraft, with its respective Titansoul, the Cruv'laaphtian Crocus. Periscorp and the Psychic Island critters are kind of like Yog Sothoth.
Necronomicon: The Dawning of Darkness	Wanadoo Edition	2001	A horror adventure game. The game's plot is a re-telling of The Case of Charles Dexter Ward, a novella by H. P. Lovecraft.
Night in the Woods	Infinite Fall, Secret Lab	2017	A horror adventure game featuring a god-like chthonic entity called the Black Goat, a reference to Shub-Niggurath.
Paradigm	Jacob Janerka	2017	In the game, a Cthulhu-flavored cupcake can be acquired from the cupcake salesperson in the hallway.
Payday 2	Overkill Software, Starbreeze Studios	2013	A four-player cooperative shooter in which players attempt to rob a bank. Cthulhu's face is available as a cosmetic item.
Phoenix Point	Snapshot Games	2018	A turn-based tactics game in which Earth is infested with a strange mist mutating fauna into Lovecraftian horrors. A background story, "The Tomb of the Phoenix", identifies the planet Yuggoth as the source of an identical infestation from millions of years ago. However, as stated by one of the writers, the exact connection is yet to be determined, and it is possible knowledge of the infestation was actually Lovecraft's inspiration in-universe, since his books are mentioned.
Prisoner of Ice	Infogrames	1995	An adventure game based on H. P. Lovecraft's Cthulhu Mythos, particularly At the Mountains of Madness.
Pump It Up	Andamiro	1999	A rhythm game series. Starting from Pump It Up Prime in 2014~2015, music artist Nato releases boss songs based on the Outer Gods: Yog Sothoth (Prime), Shub Niggurath (Prime 2), Nyarlathotep (XX), and Ghroth (Phoenix).
Quake	id Software	1996	A first-person shooter computer game whose final boss was an entity named Shub-Niggurath.
RuneScape	Jagex	2014	A quest-based on The Shadow over Innsmouth. In the Quest, called A Shadow over Ashdale, the player must save the isle-town of Ashedale from an ancient, aquatic race called Crassians - based themselves on common images of the Deep Ones.
Sam & Max: The Devil's Playhouse	Telltale Games	2010	A five-episode point-and-click adventure game from the Sam & Max series. The story features a Cthulhu-like race of Elder Gods, the most notable of them named "Yog-Soggoth".
Scribblenauts, Super Scribblenauts, Scribblenauts Remix, Scribblenauts Unlimited, Scribblenauts Unmasked	5th Cell	2009, 2010 (Nintendo DS), 2011 (iOS), 2013	Cthulhu and a shoggoth can be summoned during gameplay.
Shadow of the Comet	Infogrames	1993	An adventure game based on The Shadow over Innsmouth.
Sherlock Holmes: The Awakened	Frogwares	2007	Features an investigation into a number of disappearances believed to be the work of a Cthulhu cult.
Sherlock Holmes Versus Arsène Lupin	Frogwares	2007	Although the game's story is not directly related to the Cthulhu Mythos, a number of references are given, connected to the previous game (Sherlock Holmes: The Awakened). Sherlock Holmes has a Cthulhu statue in his possession. When interacted with, a growling noise can be heard. Barnes, the bookstore owner, who help Holmes translate a Cthulhu Mythos - related magical grimoire in the previous game, has become obsessed with it, to the point where it's beginning to wear upon his sanity. In a particular cut scene, Holmes goes into Watson's room and catches him in the midst of a nightmare, screaming about 'Tentacles'.
Sherlock Holmes: The Devil's Daughter	Frogwares	2016	Sherlock's archives contain a number of references to the Cthulhu Mythos, as well as information on one of his previous cases involving a Cthulhu Cult (Sherlock Holmes: The Awakened). The game's final antagonist, Alice Hamilton, is involved in spiritualism and the occult, and wears a talisman depicting the version of the Elder Sign appearing in the Simon Necronomicon.
SMITE	Hi-Rez Studios	2014	A third person MOBA with gods from different pantheons as playable characters, including ones from the Lovecraftian mythos. Cthulhu is playable as part of the game's growing roster of gods, mythical creatures, Heroes and many more. Ah-Muzen-Cab also has a purchasable skin inspired by Cthulhu, named "The Dark Whisperer".
South Park: The Fractured but Whole	Ubisoft	2017	A role-playing game which features Shub-Niggurath as a boss.
Sunless Sea	Failbetter Games	2016	A game set in the same universe as Fallen London, with a greater emphasis on exploration and Lovecraftian themes.
Sucker for Love: First Date	AkaBaka	2022	A parodic dating sim and horror visual novel wherein the player obtains a pink Necronomicon, and begins performing rituals to summon moe anthropomorphic beings from the Cthulhu Mythos, such as Ln'eta, a female version of Cthulhu.
Terraria	Re-Logic	2011	Eye of Cthulhu and Brain of Cthulhu are two prominent boss characters. The final boss, the Moon Lord, bears very close resemblance to Cthulhu, as well as having True Eyes of Cthulhu. It has been joked that he is Cthulhu's brother, despite him not having a brother in any of Lovecraft's stories. It was later revealed that Moon Lord is Cthulhu himself. Additionally, the Corruption biome appears to be based upon The Colour Out of Space.
The Binding of Isaac, The Binding of Isaac: Rebirth	Nicalis	2011, 2014	Roguelike games, both based on Biblical themes. Both games feature an item called Necronomicon, a direct reference to Lovecraft's Necronomicon. The Binding of Isaac: Rebirth also contains the ability for the player to transform into the Leviathan, whose design is really inspired by Lovecraftian horror.
The Lost Child	Crim	2017	A role-playing game where the Ancient Gods plot for world domination. Chtulu and Nyarlathotep are central antagonists of the story, and many creatures of Lovecraft's lore are common enemies or bosses.
The Secret World	Funcom	2012	An action-adventure MMO. Parts of the game were described by the project lead as being inspired by Lovecraft; there are locations and creatures named after Lovecraft/the Cthulhu Mythos and quests referencing/re-acting elements of it.
The Sinking City	Frogwares	2019	An open-world survival horror game inspired by a number of works by H. P. Lovecraft and August Derleth.
The Vanishing of Ethan Carter	The Austronauts	2014	An open world horror adventure video game featuring a story plot reminiscing of H. P. Lovecraft's and August Derleth's works. Several Cthulhu Mythos elements also exist, including references to the Sleeper below the Sea (Cthulhu), the sunken city (R'lyeh), the Necronomicon, the One-Who-Shall-Not-Be-Named (Hastur), etc.
The Witcher game series	CD Projekt	2007-2015	All three games of the series feature a number of references to the Cthulhu Mythos. The Witcher includes the Vodyanoi, an underwater race based on water spirits from Slavonic folklore that predates Lovecraft's works; however, the Vodynaoi in the first game resemble the Deep Ones that serve the sea-god Dagon, complete with human cultists worshiping and dealing with them. In The Witcher 2: Assassins of Kings, the book De Vermis Mysteriis appears. The Witcher 3: Wild Hunt also features a number of documents with Lovecraftian themes, including a copy of the Necronomicon as well as notes written by members of the Cult of Cthulhu.
World of Horror	panstasz (Paweł Koźmiński)	2023	A roguelite role-playing game, built around individual self-contained playthroughs consisting of five different mysteries that must be solved, in order to defeat one of several possible Old Gods that is threatening the fictional town of Shiokawa, Japan. Each of the Old Gods apply various unique effects or limitations on gameplay and are inspired or influenced by those in the Chthulu Mythos.
World of Warcraft	Blizzard Entertainment	2004	The game features a faction of Eldritch Monsters called the "Old Gods" which take heavy inspiration from the deities of the Cthulhu Mythos.
X-COM: Terror from the Deep	MicroProse	1995	Features multiple aliens that bear a close resemblance to creatures from the Cthulhu Mythos, including Cthulhu himself as "The Great Dreamer". Most names have been altered. A hidden underwater city is called "T'leth" instead of Lovecraft's R'lyeh. However, some of the original names, such as Deep One, were adopted unchanged.

== Other ==
- The 153rd episode of the Thrilling Adventure Hour podcast features an episode titled "When Cthulu Cthalls", which was recorded on September 7, 2013, and released on February 17, 2014. The episode is part of the "Beyond Belief" series and features stars Frank and Sadie Doyle protecting their friend's baby from chipper cultists and an entity only referred to as "The Old One". The Old One/Cthulhu is voiced by Parks and Recreation star Jim O'Heir.
- The BBC Radio 4 podcast series The Lovecraft Investigations (2019–2023) is a modern-day adaptation of The Case of Charles Dexter Ward, Whisperer in Darkness, The Shadow over Innsmouth and The Haunter of the Dark.
- The Malevolent podcast is heavily inspired by Lovecraft and the Cthulhu mythos, including references to The King in Yellow and Hastur.
