= Spectral Voice =

American band

Spectral Voice are an American death-doom band from Denver, Colorado. The band contains three members of Blood Incantation. They are signed to Dark Descent Records.

== History ==
Spectral Voice's demo was called Necrotic Doom, released in 2015. After five demos and two splits, the album Eroded Corridors of Unbeing was released in 2017. They toured Europe in December 2019 with Grave Miasma and Flowering Blade. They toured with Finnish death metal band Krypts in 2020. They surprise-released a split EP with Danish death metal band Undergang in June 2023. The album Sparagmos was released on February 9, 2024. It was their first full-length album in seven years. They toured North America with British doom metal band Esoteric later that year. This tour included an appearance at Maryland Deathfest.

== Musical style and influences ==
Decibel described their songs as "lo-fi doom derisions". Some of their material has been described as funeral doom. Metal Injection said the band "is like Blood Incantation distilled through diSEMBOWELMENT or Inverloch," as well as feeling "more skewed towards doom than death metal, but always willing to dabble in both." The band has cited early Finnish death metal acts such as Rippikoulu, Sentenced, Abhorrence, Thergothon, Demigod, Demilich, diSEMBOWELMENT, Symphony of Grief, Mythic, Eternal Darkness and Rottrevore as influences.
