= Netherheaven =

Studio album by Revocation
- Released: September 9, 2022
- Studio: Fascination Street Studios in Örebro, Sweden; HeatWave Studios; The Brick HitHouse (Hyannis, Massachusetts, United States)
- Genre: Progressive death metal; thrash metal
- Length: 44:45
- Label: Metal Blade
- Producer: Jens Bogren

Revocation chronology
The Outer Ones (2018)	Netherheaven (2022)	New Gods, New Masters (2025)

Singles from Netherheaven
- 1. "Diabolical Majesty" Released: July 6, 2022; 2. "Re-Crucified" Released: August 9, 2022; 3. "Nihilistic Violence" Released: September 12, 2022; 4. "Godforsaken" Released: January 15, 2023

Professional ratings
Review scores
Source	Rating
Blabbermouth	8/10
Distorted Sound	10/10
Metal.de	8/10

Netherheaven is the eighth studio album by the American technical death metal band Revocation, released on September 09, 2022, via Metal Blade. It is the band's first album not to feature rhythm guitarist Dan Gargiulo after his departure in June 2020 and final album to feature bassist Brett Bamberger. This is also their third album since Existence Is Futile, marks their return as a trio.

"Re-Crucified" features guest vocal appearances from the late Trevor Strnad of The Black Dahlia Murder and George "Corpsegrinder" Fisher of Cannibal Corpse. Frontman David Davidson stated, "My whole idea of having two guest vocalists was inspired by Dante's Inferno. I wanted it to feel like the journey through the different circles of hell and the interactions with different demons and apparitions. Trevor's theatrical style added a great narrative and Corpsegrinder is just a powerhouse. It’s not often you get two icons on one track."

Revocation promoted the album with a European tour in January and February 2023, with support from Goatwhore, Alluvial, and Creeping Death.

== Track listing ==
All tracks are written by Dave Davidson.

Netherheaven track listing
No.	Title	Length
1.	"Diabolical Majesty"	4:56
2.	"Lessons in Occult Theft"	5:39
3.	"Nihilistic Violence"	5:04
4.	"Strange and Eternal"	5:52
5.	"Galleries of Morbid Artistry"	5:25
6.	"The 9th Chasm"	3:37
7.	"Godforsaken"	4:45
8.	"The Intervening Abyss of Untold Aeons"	5:43
9.	"Re-Crucified"	3:44
Total length:		44:48

== Personnel ==
Revocation

- Dave Davidson – guitars, vocals
- Brett Bamberger – bass
- Ash Pearson – drums

Guest vocalist

- Trevor Strnad - vocals on "Re-Crucified"
- George "Corpsegrinder" Fisher - vocals on "Re-Crucified"

Production and design

- Jens Bogren – production, recording, mixing, mastering
- Revocation – production
- James Knoerl – production assistant
- Shane Frisby – recording (drums)
- Richard Houghten – mastering (vinyl)
- Paolo Girardi – artwork
- Brian Ames – layout
