= Existence Is Futile =

Existence Is Futile may refer to:

- Existence Is Futile (Cradle of Filth album), a 2021 album by Cradle of Filth
- Existence Is Futile (Revocation album), a 2009 album by Revocation
