= Unending Degradation =

Studio album by Krypts
- Released: 19 February 2013
- Recorded: 2012 at Kryptomb
- Genre: Death metal, death-doom
- Length: 38:39
- Label: Dark Descent Records

Krypts chronology
Krypts (2011)	Unending Degradation (2013)

Professional ratings
Review scores
Source	Rating
Metal Psalter	4/5 stars
Metal Temple	6/10 stars
Sputnikmusic	4/5 stars

Unending Degradation is the first studio album by Finnish death metal band Krypts. It was released on 19 February 2013 through Dark Descent Records. The album was made available on CD, vinyl and digital download.

== Track listing ==
No.	Title	Length
1.	"Introeon: Perpetual Beyond"	01:58
2.	"Blessed Entwinement"	04:10
3.	"Open the Crypt"	06:28
4.	"Dormancy of the Ancients"	07:31
5.	"Inhale…"	03:54
6.	"The Black Smoke"	03:20
7.	"Day of Reckoning"	04:34
8.	"Beneath the Archaic"	06:44
Total length:		38:39

== Personnel ==
Krypts

- Otso Ukkonen - Drums, guitars
- Ville Snicker - Guitars
- Antti Kotiranta - Vocals, bass, lyrics

Miscellaneous staff

- Timo Ketola - Cover art, additional artwork (Entwinement & Exhale), layout, logo
- Otso Ukkonen - Recording, mixing
- Samu Salovaara - Additional artwork (The Eye & The Urn)
