= Empire of the Obscene =

Studio album by Revocation
- Released: February 12, 2008
- Recorded: 2007
- Studio: Damage Studios in Southbridge, Massachusetts, United States
- Genre: Technical death metal, thrash metal
- Length: 55:47
- Label: Independent/self-released; Metal Blade (re-release)

Revocation chronology
Summon the Spawn (2006)	Empire of the Obscene (2008)	Existence Is Futile (2009)

Empire of the Obscene is the debut studio album by the American technical death metal band Revocation. It was released in February 12, 2008 under an independent label. This is the only Revocation album to be self-released, as the band was signed to Relapse Records in early 2009. The album was remixed, remastered and reissued in 2015 on Metal Blade Records, with Summon the Spawn EP as bonus material.

== Track listing ==
No.	Title	Length
1.	"Unattained"	3:41
2.	"Tail from the Crypt"	4:40
3.	"Exhumed Identity"	6:52
4.	"Fields of Predation"	5:59
5.	"Alliance and Tyranny"	4:59
6.	"Suffer These Wounds"	6:11
7.	"Summon the Spawn"	5:39
8.	"None Shall Be Spared (All Shall Be Speared)"	5:44
9.	"Stillness"	2:04
10.	"Age of Iniquity"	4:59
11.	"Empire of the Obscene"	4:59
Total length:		55:47

== Personnel ==
- David Davidson - guitars, lead vocals
- Anthony Buda - bass, backing vocals
- Phil Dubois-Coyne - drums
