= Teratogenesis (EP) =

EP by Revocation
- Released: September 25, 2012
- Genre: Technical death metal, thrash metal
- Length: 21:38
- Label: Scion A/V
- Producer: Zeuss

Revocation chronology
Chaos of Forms (2011)	Teratogenesis (2012)	Revocation (2013)

Teratogenesis is the second EP by the American technical death metal band Revocation. It was released for free through Scion A/V on September 25, 2012. It is the first release to feature Brett Bamberger (formerly of East Of The Wall) who handled bass duties following the departure of original member Anthony Buda. It is their first release to feature the use of seven-string guitars.

== Track listing ==
All music is composed by Davidson, except where noted.

No.	Title	Lyrics	Music	Length
1.	"The Grip Tightens"			4:10
2.	"Spurn the Outstretched Hand"	Buda		4:07
3.	"Maniacally Unleashed"	Buda	Gargiulo	3:41
4.	"Teratogenesis"			4:06
5.	"Bound by Desire"	Buda		5:34
6.	"Pull The Plug" (Death cover)	Schuldiner	Schuldiner	4:24
Total length:				21:38

Writing credits taken from DarkLyrics.com.

== Personnel ==
Revocation

- David Davidson – lead guitar, lead vocals
- Dan Gargiulo – rhythm guitar, backing vocals
- Brett Bamberger – bass
- Phil Dubois-Coyne – drums
