= Looming in the Gloom =

EP by The Gothic Archies
- Released: March 1996
- Recorded: 1996
- Genre: Indie pop, gothic rock
- Length: 9:17

The Gothic Archies chronology
Looming in the Gloom (1996)	The New Despair (1997)

Looming in the Gloom is an E.P. released by The Gothic Archies. This album marks the first appearance of the all-Merritt macabre synth-pop synonymous The Gothic Archies.

== Production ==
Looming in the Gloom was released on the Hello CD of the Month Club (run by They Might Be Giants) in March 1996. The third track, "The Dead Only Quickly", was later transformed into a The 6ths' track sung by Neil Hannon, only after his own band (The Divine Comedy) covered it and released it as a B-side. The last track is the original mix of "City of the Damned".

== Track listing ==
1. "The Abandoned Castle of My Soul" – 3:11
2. "Your Long White Fingers" – 1:34
3. "The Dead Only Quickly" – 1:10
4. "In a Cave" – 1:41
5. "City of the Damned" – 1:42
