= The New Despair =

Studio album by The Gothic Archies
- Released: 1997
- Genre: Indie pop
- Length: 16:08

The Gothic Archies chronology
Looming in the Gloom (1996)	The New Despair (1997)	The Tragic Treasury: Songs from A Series of Unfortunate Events (2006)

Professional ratings
Review scores
Source	Rating
Allmusic	3/5 stars

The New Despair is the 1997 debut album by The Gothic Archies.

== Track listing ==
No.	Title	Length
1.	"It's Useless to Struggle"	2:30
2.	"City of the Damned"	1:41
3.	"The Abandoned Castle of My Soul"	3:12
4.	"Your Long White Fingers"	1:36
5.	"Ever Falls the Twilight"	3:43
6.	"The Tiny Goat"	1:48
7.	"In a Cave"	1:38
Total length:		16:08
