= Chaos of Forms =

Studio album by Revocation
- Released: August 16, 2011
- Recorded: November 2010 – January 2011
- Studios: Damage Studios in Southbridge, Massachusetts, United States
- Genres: Technical death metal, thrash metal
- Length: 46:59
- Label: Relapse
- Producers: Revocation, Peter Rutcho

Revocation chronology
Existence Is Futile (2009)	Chaos of Forms (2011)	Teratogenesis (2012)

Chaos of Forms is the third studio album by the American technical death metal band Revocation, released on August 16, 2011 by Relapse Records. The song "Cradle Robber" was released and streamed on their Facebook page on May 10, 2011. This album is the last album to feature the original bassist Anthony Buda, and the first album to feature guitarist Dan Gargiulo.

== Critical reception ==
Professional ratings
Review scores
Source	Rating
Real Metal Reviews	10/10 stars
The Daily Rotation	9.3/10 stars
Metal Injection	8.9/10 stars
The New Review	4.5/5 stars

Chaos of Forms was well received by critics. The Daily Rotation awarded the album 9.3 out of 10, calling it "one of the best records of the year" that produces "some of the catchiest and heaviest metal since Pantera".

== Track listing ==
All music is composed by Davidson.

No.	Title	Lyrics	Length
1.	"Cretin"	Davidson	3:03
2.	"Cradle Robber"	Davidson	4:25
3.	"Harlot"	Davidson	2:51
4.	"Dissolution Ritual"	Buda	4:37
5.	"Conjuring the Cataclysm"	Davidson	4:34
6.	"No Funeral"	Buda	3:55
7.	"Fractal Entity" (instrumental)		1:43
8.	"Chaos of Forms"	Buda	4:30
9.	"The Watchers"	Buda	4:12
10.	"Beloved Horrifier"	Davidson	4:09
11.	"Dethroned"	Davidson	4:57
12.	"Reprogrammed"	Buda	4:03
Total length:			46:59

Deluxe edition bonus track
No.	Title	Lyrics	Music	Length
13.	"Surprise! You're Dead!" (Faith No More cover)	Patton	Martin	2:11
Total length:				49:10

== Personnel ==
Writing, performance and production credits are adapted from the album liner notes.

Revocation

- David Davidson – lead guitar, lead vocals
- Dan Gargiulo – rhythm guitar
- Anthony Buda – bass, backing vocals
- Phil Dubois-Coyne – drums

Additional musicians

- Davindar Singh – baritone saxophone on "The Watchers"
- Wyatt Palmer – tenor saxophone on "The Watchers"
- Derek Beckvold – alto saxophone on "The Watchers"
- Nigel Taylor – trumpet on "The Watchers"
- Pete Rutcho – organ solo on "The Watchers"

Production

- Revocation – production
- Peter Rutcho – production, recording, engineering, mixing

Artwork and design

- Orion Landau – design

== Chart performance ==
Chart (2011)	Peak position
US Heatseekers Albums (Billboard)	24
