= New Gods, New Masters =

Studio album by Revocation
- Released: September 26, 2025
- Genres: Technical death metal; thrash metal
- Length: 44:21
- Label: Metal Blade
- Producer: David Davidson

Revocation chronology
Netherheaven (2022)	New Gods, New Masters (2025)

Singles from New Gods, New Masters
- 1. "Cronenberged" Released: June 18, 2025

New Gods, New Masters is the ninth studio album by the American technical death metal band Revocation. It was released on September 26, 2025, via Metal Blade in vinyl and digital formats. New Gods, New Masters is band's first album to feature guitarist Harry Lannon and bassist Alex Weber.

== Background ==
The album was produced by the band's vocalist David Davidson and Jens Bogren, who also mixed it. It includes collaborations with Cattle Decapitation vocalist Travis Ryan, and Job for a Cowboy singer Jonny Davy, Gorguts vocalist Luc Lemay, and Gilad Hekselman.

The title of the album was inspired by Davidson's perspective on spirituality. He stated, "I believe we've replaced our old gods with new ones, worshipping technology and creating a cult-like idolatry of innovators," noting uncertainty over the fate of humanity due to the emergence of AI. "Cronenberged" was released as the lead single on June 18, 2025.

== Reception ==
Professional ratings
Review scores
Source	Rating
Blabbermouth	8.5/10
Kerrang!	4/5

Dan Slessor of Kerrang! assigned the album a rating of four and remarked, "they now return with their ninth, and continue to prove why they basically rule and are essential listening for anyone with a taste for extreme sounds intelligently structured and delivered with pure brute force."

Blabbermouth's Dom Lawson described it as "lyrically ferocious and intelligent", stating "New Gods, New Masters sustains the momentum that has propelled them through two decades of rabid service. Having taken no prisoners in the past," rating it 8.5. Metal.de editor Jannik Kleemann referred to the album as "a cleanly produced, convincing work without any significant weaknesses."

== Track listing ==
All tracks are written by Dave Davidson.

New Gods, New Masters track listing
No.	Title	Length
1.	"New Gods, New Masters"	5:14
2.	"Sarcophagi of the Soul"	4:10
3.	"Confines of Infinity"	4:47
4.	"Dystopian Vermin"	4:35
5.	"Despiritualized"	5:50
6.	"The All Seeing"	5:19
7.	"Data Corpse"	3:29
8.	"Cronenberged"	3:29
9.	"Buried Epoch"	7:28
Total length:		44:21

== Personnel ==
- Dave Davidson – lead guitar, vocals
- Harry Lannon – rhythm guitar
- Alex Weber – bass
- Ash Pearson – drums
- Travis Ryan - vocals on "Confines of Infinity"
- Gilad Hekselman - guitar on "The All Seeing"
- Jonny Davy - vocals on "Cronenberged"
- Luc Lemay - vocals on "Buried Epoch"
- Jens Bogren – mixing, mastering
- Paolo Girardi – artwork

== Charts ==
Chart performance for New Gods, New Masters
Chart (2025)	Peak position
French Physical Albums (SNEP)	179
French Rock & Metal Albums (SNEP)	79
US Top Current Album Sales (Billboard)	47
