= Revocation (album) =

2013 album

Studio album by Revocation
- Released: August 6, 2013
- Recorded: February – March 2013
- Studios: Damage Studios in Southbridge, Massachusetts, United States (guitars, bass and vocals); The Brick HitHouse in Hyannis, Massachusetts, United States (drums)
- Genres: Technical death metal, thrash metal
- Length: 45:52
- Label: Relapse
- Producers: Revocation, Peter Rutcho

Revocation chronology
Teratogenesis (2012)	Revocation (2013)	Deathless (2014)

Professional ratings
Review scores
Source	Rating
About.com	3.5/5 stars
Exclaim!	7/10
Metalstorm.net	6.0/10
Popmatters	8/10
Rock Hard	9.0/10

Revocation is the fourth studio album by the American technical death metal band Revocation, released on August 6, 2013, by Relapse Records.

The album entered the US Billboard 200 at #159. selling 2,500 copies in the first week

== Track listing ==
All lyrics are written by Davidson; all music is composed by Davidson, except where noted.

No.	Title	Music	Length
1.	"The Hive"		3:44
2.	"Scattering the Flock"	Gargiulo	5:28
3.	"Archfiend"		5:42
4.	"Numbing Agents"		3:18
5.	"Fracked"		3:52
6.	"The Gift You Gave"		5:31
7.	"Invidious"		4:27
8.	"Spastic" (instrumental)		3:57
9.	"Entombed by Wealth"		4:09
10.	"A Visitation"	Gargiulo	5:44
Total length:			45:52

Deluxe edition bonus track
No.	Title	Lyrics	Music	Length
11.	"Dyers Eve" (Metallica cover)	Hetfield	Hetfield, Ulrich, Hammett	5:15
Total length:				51:07

== Personnel ==
Writing, performance and production credits are adapted from the album liner notes.

Revocation

- David Davidson – lead guitar, lead vocals, backing vocals and banjo on "Invidious"
- Dan Gargiulo – rhythm guitar, backing vocals, backing vocals on "Invidious"
- Brett Bamberger – bass, backing vocals on "Invidious"
- Phil Dubois-Coyne – drums, backing vocals on "Invidious"

Additional Musicians

- Peter Rutcho – backing vocals on "Invidious"
- Pat Faherty – backing vocals on "Invidious"

Production

- Revocation – production
- Peter Rutcho – production, recording, engineering, mixing

Artwork and design

- Orion Landau – design

== Chart performance ==
Chart (2013)	Peak position
US Billboard 200	159
US Independent Albums (Billboard)	35
US Top Hard Rock Albums (Billboard)	15
US Heatseekers Albums (Billboard)	4
US Top Rock Albums (Billboard)	44
