= Mythos (card game) =

Collectible card game

- Cardback to the Mythos CCG.
- Designers: Charlie Krank
- Publishers: Chaosium
- Players: 2+
- Playing time: Approx 45 min
- Chance: Some
- Age range: 10+
- Skills: Card playing Arithmetic; Basic Reading Ability

Mythos is an out-of-print collectible card game published by Chaosium from 1996 to 1997. It is based on the Cthulhu Mythos stories of the horror author H. P. Lovecraft, as well as on Chaosium's own Call of Cthulhu role-playing game.

== Overview ==
In 1996, Chaosium decided to join the ongoing collectible card game boom and published Mythos, designed by Charlie Krank. It received critical acclaim, winning the 1996 Best Card Game Origins Award, and initially sold well. Later expansions however, most notably the non-collectible Standard Game Set, fared poorly and forced Chaosium to discontinue Mythos. The production was stopped after the release of New Aeon in 1997, only a year after the game's initial release.

In 1999, Pyramid magazine named Mythos as one of The Millennium's Best Card Games. Editor Scott Haring said "Mythos was a very deserving game, with great art and gameplay that involved more than just monsters fighting each other."

== Game play ==
Mythos was designed to include a high level of player interaction, in the vein of some traditional card games like rummy. Game play borrowed concepts from previous CCG titles, but also introduced new, innovative mechanics.

The game is playable by two players, but is really intended to be played by a larger number. Increasing the number of players makes completing adventures more important, and encourages development of other strategies other than disrupting an opponent's game. Mythos tournament games are conducted with four players.

Like most collectible card games, a Mythos player constructs a deck from available cards within certain restrictions. A player chooses an investigator card to represent his character. Each investigator has special abilities and numerical attributes, most notably "sanity". Some cards can lower an investigator's sanity score, and when it reaches zero the investigator is eliminated from the game.

The main objective of the game is to collect points by completing "adventures". Adventures are cards that include keywords derived from different card names and types. Once the required cards are in the player's story deck or on the table, the player can play the adventure and receive its points. When a player reaches the number of adventure points previously agreed upon (usually 20), the game ends after the current round and the winner is determined.

Each player can normally play only one card at a time, after which the turn is passed to the next player. This continues until a certain number of players have passed their turns without playing any cards.

== Cards ==
=== Investigator ===
A double-sized card played on the table at the start of the game to represent the player. Examples: Adventurous Dilettante//Proud Prussian Submariner, Obsessed Federal Agent//Obsessed Agent in Mi-Go Braincase. (The first is from the game's original release and is simply two different Investigators printed on the same card; the second is from the final expansion, which contained a few ways of "flipping" the investigator card, enabling you to start as a "human" character and be transformed into a "monster".)

=== Adventure ===
An Adventure card consists of a short story, in which certain key phrases are highlighted and need to be completed to play the Adventure card. Some Adventures are of general type, some try to recreate famous events from Lovecraft's stories. Examples: The Dunwich Horror, Summon Great Cthulhu.

=== Ally ===
Allies (as well as all other card types) are used to satisfy different Adventure requirements and know languages that make comprehending foreign Tomes possible. They also protect your Investigator from Monsters and other cards. The allies featured in the set are drawn mainly from Lovecraftian fiction, but also include real-life people, mostly authors, as game characters. Examples: Randolph Carter, Edgar Allan Poe, Dr. Carl Jung.

=== Artifact ===
Artifacts are items that can be found at Artifact Locations. They help the Investigator in myriad ways or give bonuses to his or her Allies. Some Artifacts, mostly Weapons, are assigned to a particular Ally, but most are simply kept next to your Investigator card. Examples: Jewelry of the Deep Ones, Tommygun.

=== Event ===
Events represent calamities, phobias, weather conditions, day-night cycle, methods of travel, and other surprising things that can happen to one or more investigators or cards. Examples: Eclipse of the Sun, Townsfolk Riot.

=== Location ===
During the game, investigators travel to different locations by walking or by using different methods of transportation (by playing Event cards such as Train). In true Lovecraftian spirit, some Locations are real while others are fictitious. Locations may be in various "regions" (color-coded) or "dimensions" (indicated by a symbol); this complicates the process of playing a new location, as some are difficult or impossible to travel to from others. Examples: Massachusetts State Hospital, R'lyeh

=== Monster ===
Playing a Monster requires certain locations which are marked as a "gate", and can usually only be used once. Monsters are played face down into a "mythos threat", where their strength may be roughly guessed at by the Sanity cost required to play them, but their exact identity is unknown. At the end of the round, they are divided into one or more "directed threats" which each attack a different opponent; two threats directed at each other usually fight, the stronger being reduced and the weaker eliminated, with survivors slaying the defending player's Allies or damaging his Investigator's Sanity. Most are drawn from Cthulhu Mythos and some are Great Old Ones or Outer Gods with powers that affect every Investigator (unlike all other Monsters, these are played face-up, requiring certain cards or gameplay conditions, never engage in combat, and remain in play for two rounds rather than one). Examples: Colour out of space, Nyarlathotep.

=== Spell ===
Spells can be found in Tomes. Some corrupt allies can also know Spells. Casting spells costs your Investigator sanity, but can help you or hinder your opponent in many ways. Spells are marked with icons defining which tomes they can be found in. Examples: Create Gate, Thirty-five Abominable Adulations of the Bloated One.

=== Tome ===
Arcane literature that contains Spells. Each Tome is written in a language, which your Investigator or an Ally must be listed as speaking before you can play the Tome. Tomes may be played with several Spells in them, an exception to the general rule of playing only one card per turn in most cases. Examples: Necronomicon, Unaussprechlichen Kulten.

== Distribution ==
Mythos was available in boosters and starters, which contained a fixed number of common, uncommon and rare cards distributed randomly. The Mythos Standard Game Set deviated from this practice.

Cards are illustrated by various artists using very various styles, some cards being photo-realistic paintings, some computer-generated and some examples of modern arts.

=== Mythos Limited Edition ===
Mythos Limited Edition (1996) was divided into starters, which also contained a random investigator, and into 3 different boosters. Each booster contained cards from Limited Edition plus 67 unique cards from the different starters.

- Expeditions of Miskatonic University
- Cthulhu Rising
- Legends of the Necronomicon

Mythos Limited Edition was distributed in Starter decks and in the three booster pack expansions (Expeditions of Miskatonic University/Cthulhu Rising/Legends of the Necronomicon). Limited Edition consists of 10 double-sided investigator cards, 50 rare, 50 uncommon, 99 common, 2 promo, 1 insert cards. Each of the three booster expansion sets consists of 17 rare, 17 uncommon, 33 common cards.

The Limited Edition Starter decks contains 60 cards and a random (folded) investigator card. Each booster box contains 36 booster packs and a sealed (unfolded) set of the ten investigator cards. Each booster pack contains 13 cards including two rare cards, one of which is from the expansion and the other either from the expansion or from the limited set, four uncommon cards, and seven common cards.

=== Mythos Standard Game Set ===
Mythos Standard Game Set (unlimited) (1997), unlike other Mythos sets, did not have boosters. Instead it came in two pre-constructed, out-of-the-box playable 52-card decks packed together.

=== Mythos: The Dreamlands ===
Mythos: The Dreamlands (1997) introduced the concept of a different dimension, Dreamlands, with all new Investigators, boosters and starters. It had a projected print run of 35 million cards. The 200-card set was sold in 60-card starter decks and 13-card booster packs. It was based on Lovecraft's Dream Cycle stories.

=== New Aeon ===
New Aeon (1997), at times known as Mythos Now before its release, was a 200-card stand-alone expansion set distributed in the same way as The Dreamlands. The setting was modern age, with a lighter, popular culture overtone in illustration and card design (notably including references to modern beliefs in UFOs as well as time travel, as well as the presence of military hardware and mention of nuclear radiation). Due to the game's cancellation, New Aeon had a far lower print run than preceding sets (especially The Dreamlands), and sold out quickly after it became known that the game was discontinued.

== Reception ==
Paul Pettengale reviewed Mythos for Arcane magazine, rating it an 8 out of 10 overall. Pettengale comments that "It's an enjoyable diversion from CoC, and a game that I can recommend to those of you who appreciate Lovecraft's works and have some experience of CoC roleplaying."

Paul Pettengale reviewed the Cthulhu Rising expansion set for Arcane magazine, rating it a 6 out of 10 overall. Pettengale comments that "it doesn't have an easily discernable personality of its own. Without the basic set cards diluting the set, I'd have liked it a lot more."

John D. Rateliff commented that Mythos "remains the high water mark for capturing roleplaying sensibilities within a trading card game, and also stands as the best translation of a RPG into a card game, conveying the flavor of the original roleplaying game while also succeeding as a card game in its own right."

Allan Varney, in a review published in The Duelist, stated that the rulebook supplied with the original set is "opaquely written and requires study", but that the rules "are rather simple".

Paul Pettengale reviewed the Legends of the Necronomicon expansion for Arcane magazine, rating it a 7 out of 10 overall, and stated that "I enjoyed this expansion more than the previous two, but when Chaosium prints future unlimited expansion sets, it Should drop the policy of including basic set cards in the expansion mix."

== See also ==
- Call of Cthulhu: The Card Game
- Cthulhu Mythos in popular culture
- List of collectible card games
- The Art of Playing Mythos
