= The Art of Playing Mythos =

Collectable card game book

The Art of Playing Mythos, subtitled "A Tome of Arcane Knowledge", is a book published by Chaosium in 1996 about Mythos, a collectible card game (CCG) published by Chaosium the same year.

== Description ==
The Art of Playing Mythos starts with an expansion of the rules included in each Mythos starter set that explains some ambiguities in the original rules and provides some errata. The book then gives some instruction on deck construction, and how to make one's deck focus on the storytelling aspect of the game.

The book also lists every card published at that time, with extensive background on some of the cards. A section then gives tips and tactics on how to play the game, and a Frequently Asked Questions section provides answers.

== Publication history ==
With the sudden success of Magic: The Gathering in 1993 and the subsequent rise of other CCGs, Chaosium entered the market in 1996 with Mythos, and also released the promotional product The Art of Playing Mythos, a 160-page book written by Scott David, Aniolowski, Charlie Crank, Eric Rowe and Lynn Willis.

== Reception ==
In the July 1997 edition of Dragon (Issue #237), Rick Swan thought that "serious players should ... consider investing in The Art of Playing Mythos.

In Issue 10 of Arcane, Paul Pettingale questioned the inclusion of the rules, which were also included in every starter deck. Pettingale also thought too much of the book (60 pages) was spent on describing some of the cards, and not enough (20 pages) was spent on game tactics. He concluded by giving the book a poor rating of 5 out of 10, saying, "I can't help feeling that the tactics section could and should have been beefed up from 20 to around 70 pages, and the peripheral information minimised to add worth to the book for seasoned Mythos players."
