= Great Is Our Sin =

Studio album by Revocation
- Released: July 22, 2016
- Recorded: January 2–February 13, 2016
- Studio: Planet Z in Hadley, Massachusetts, United States (guitars, bass and vocals); Dexters Lab Recording in Milford, Connecticut, United States (drums)
- Genre: Progressive death metal, thrash metal
- Length: 47:53
- Label: Metal Blade
- Producer: Revocation, Zeuss

Revocation chronology
Deathless (2014)	Great Is Our Sin (2016)	The Outer Ones (2018)

Professional ratings
Review scores
Source	Rating
AllMusic	favorable
Loudwire	favorable
MetalSucks	4.5/5

Great Is Our Sin is the sixth studio album by the American technical death metal band Revocation, released on July 22, 2016. It is the band's first album to feature drummer Ash Pearson, who replaced original drummer Phil Dubois-Coyne in 2015.

== Release and promotion ==
The release of Great Is Our Sin was first announced on May 24, along with the release of the first single "Communion". On June 9, the second song, "Monolithic Ignorance" was released as a lyric video via Stereogum. A lyric video for "Crumbling Imperium" premiered at Loudwire on June 23. David Davidson appeared on the MetalSucks podcast #153 to talk about Great Is Our Sin. "Profanum Vulgus" debuted on the podcast as well.

== Track listing ==
All lyrics are written by David Davidson; all music is composed by Davidson, except where noted.

No.	Title	Music	Length
1.	"Arbiters of the Apocalypse"		4:20
2.	"Theatre of Horror"		4:33
3.	"Monolithic Ignorance"	Gargiulo	4:33
4.	"Crumbling Imperium"		5:24
5.	"Communion"		4:44
6.	"The Exaltation" (instrumental)		3:40
7.	"Profanum Vulgus"		5:27
8.	"Copernican Heresy"		3:44
9.	"Only the Spineless Survive"		4:19
10.	"Cleaving Giants of Ice"	Gargiulo	4:22
Total length:			45:07

Bonus track
No.	Title	Lyrics	Music	Length
11.	"Altar of Sacrifice" (Slayer cover)	King	Hanneman	2:46
Total length:				47:53

== Credits ==
Writing, performance and production credits are adapted from the album liner notes.

=== Personnel ===
==== Revocation ====
- Dave Davidson – lead guitar, lead vocals
- Dan Gargiulo – rhythm guitar, backing vocals
- Brett Bamberger – bass
- Ash Pearson – drums

==== Guest musicians ====
- Marty Friedman – guitar solo on "The Exaltation"

==== Production and design ====
- Revocation – production
- Zeuss – production, recording, mixing, mastering
- Tom Strom – artwork
- Brian Ames – layout

== Charts ==
Chart (2016)	Peak position
Belgian Albums (Ultratop Wallonia)	169
US Billboard 200	189
