= MetaArcade =

American game production company

- Type: Video game developer
- Industry: Video games
- Founded: 2016
- Founder: David Reid
- Defunct: 2020
- Headquarters: Mercer Island, Washington, The United States of America
- Key people: David Reid
- Products: Adventure Creator, Cthulhu Chronicles, Tunnels & Trolls Adventures
- Number of employees: 12 (2018)
- Website: www.metaarcade.com

MetaArcade was a Seattle, Washington area-based independent game production company founded in 2016 by David Reid, focused on interactive fiction adventures for mobile platforms.

They produced Adventure Creator, a platform which allows users to easily create interactive fiction adventures for mobile devices.

In 2016, MetaArcade released Tunnels & Trolls Adventures based on the Tunnels & Trolls tabletop role-playing game. The game won the MMORPG.com "Best Mobile MMO or RPG" award at PAX West 2016.

In 2018, MetaArcade released the Cthulhu Chronicles, a campaign of several interactive adventures based on Call of Cthulhu (role-playing game).

In late 2019, MetaArcade sold the Tunnels & Trolls Adventures and Adventure Creator assets to Trollhalla Press Unlimited, a print and digital publishing company owned by Ken St. Andre, but the sale was not widely announced until early 2020. MetaArcade sold the Cthulhu Chronicles assets to Chaosium.

In 2020, MetaArcade shut their doors.
