= The Outer Ones =

Studio album by Revocation
- Released: September 28, 2018
- Recorded: February – April 2018
- Studio: Planet Z (Hadley, Massachusetts, United States); The Brick HitHouse (Hyannis, Massachusetts, United States)
- Genre: Progressive death metal; thrash metal
- Length: 48:20
- Label: Metal Blade
- Producer: Zeuss; Revocation

Revocation chronology
Great Is Our Sin (2016)	The Outer Ones (2018)	Netherheaven (2022)

Singles from The Outer Ones
- 1. "Of Unworldly Origin" Released: July 10, 2018; 2. "The Outer Ones" Released: August 21, 2018; 3. "Blood Atonement" Released: September 24, 2018

The Outer Ones is the seventh studio album by the American technical death metal band Revocation, released on September 28, 2018, via Metal Blade. Some of the songs are inspired from H.P. Lovecraft's works.

It is the band's final album to feature rhythm guitarist Dan Gargiulo before his departure in June 2020.

== Track listing ==
All lyrics are written by Dave Davidson; all music is composed by Davidson, except where noted.

The Outer Ones track listing
No.	Title	Music	Length
1.	"Of Unworldly Origin"		4:29
2.	"That Which Consumes All Things"		5:29
3.	"Blood Atonement"	Gargiulo	4:44
4.	"Fathomless Catacombs"		5:34
5.	"The Outer Ones"		5:42
6.	"Vanitas"		5:54
7.	"Ex Nihilo" (instrumental)		4:24
8.	"Luciferous"	Gargiulo	4:49
9.	"A Starless Darkness"		7:15
Total length:			48:20

== Personnel ==
Revocation

- Dave Davidson – lead guitar, lead vocals
- Dan Gargiulo – rhythm guitar, backing vocals
- Brett Bamberger – bass
- Ash Pearson – drums

Production and design

- Zeuss – production, recording, mixing, mastering
- Revocation – production
- Shane Frisby – recording (drums)
- Sean Fitzpatrick – editing (drums)
- Richard Houghten – mastering (vinyl)
- Tom Strom – artwork
- Brian Ames – layout
