= The Tragic Treasury: Songs from A Series of Unfortunate Events =

Studio album by the Gothic Archies
- Released: October 10, 2006
- Recorded: 2000–2006
- Studios: Mother West and Polar West, New York City
- Genres: Indie pop, goth
- Length: 41:18
- Label: Nonesuch
- Producer: The Gothic Archies

The Gothic Archies chronology
The New Despair (1997)	The Tragic Treasury: Songs from A Series of Unfortunate Events (2006)

Professional ratings
Aggregate scores
Source	Rating
Metacritic	74/100
Review scores
Source	Rating
AllMusic	3.5/5 stars
The Guardian	4/5 stars
IGN	7.9/10
MSN Music (Consumer Guide)	A−
The Observer	3/5 stars
Pitchfork	7.8/10
Slant Magazine	2.5/5 stars
Spin	4/5 stars

The Tragic Treasury: Songs from A Series of Unfortunate Events is the second studio album by American indie pop band the Gothic Archies, released on October 10, 2006, by Nonesuch Records. It is a concept album where the songs are inspired by the thirteen books of Daniel Handler's book series A Series of Unfortunate Events and were originally included at the end of the audiobook editions of each novel.

The music, like the writing in the books themselves, is morose for comic effect. Some of the songs' lyrics have something to do with the story itself and are often implicitly written in the voice of one of the corresponding book's characters; for example, "When You Play the Violin" is apparently in the voice of one of the book's five orphans, most likely Klaus, while "Dreary, Dreary" appears to be an ode to Beatrice, Lemony Snicket's ill-fated love interest. Others' connections seem to be in name only; for example, "Shipwrecked", The End's song, is about a man who decapitates his ship's crew in an attempt to be shipwrecked on an island with his true love, only to discover that there is no island anywhere nearby.

The album has 13 tracks, each one corresponding to the respective book of the series, plus two bonus tracks: "Walking My Gargoyle" (the theme originally intended to be from The Carnivorous Carnival) and "We Are the Gothic Archies".

== Track listing ==
All tracks are written by Stephin Merritt.

No.	Title	Length
1.	"Scream and Run Away"	2:25
2.	"In the Reptile Room"	2:14
3.	"The World Is a Very Scary Place"	2:25
4.	"Dreary, Dreary"	2:41
5.	"When You Play the Violin"	3:53
6.	"This Abyss"	3:06
7.	"Crows"	2:41
8.	"Smile! No One Cares How You Feel"	1:51
9.	"Freakshow"	2:56
10.	"How Do You Slow This Thing Down?"	3:11
11.	"A Million Mushrooms"	1:58
12.	"Things Are Not What They Appear"	3:46
13.	"Shipwrecked"	2:37
Total length:		41:18

Bonus tracks
No.	Title	Length
14.	"Walking My Gargoyle"	2:38
15.	"We Are the Gothic Archies"	2:56

== Personnel ==
The Gothic Archies

- Stephin Merritt

Additional personnel

- Lemony Snicket (aka Daniel Handler) – accordion
- John Woo – electric sitar

== See also ==
- A Series of Unfortunate Events
- Lemony Snicket
