= Winter Tide =

2017 novel by Ruthanna Emrys

- First edition cover
- Author: Ruthanna Emrys
- Cover artist: John Jude Palencar
- Language: English
- Series: Innsmouth Legacy
- Release number: 2
- Genres: Alternate history Lovecraftian horror fantasy
- Publisher: Tor Books
- Publication date: April 4, 2017
- Publication place: United States
- Media type: Hardback
- Pages: 366
- ISBN: 978-0-7653-9090-5
- Preceded by: The Litany of Earth
- Followed by: Deep Roots

Winter Tide is a 2017 alternate history, fantasy and horror novel by American science fiction and fantasy writer Ruthanna Emrys. It is Emrys' debut novel, and the second book in her three book Innsmouth Legacy series, the first being the novella, The Litany of Earth (2014). The series is set in the Cthulhu Mythos universe created by H. P. Lovecraft, and builds on Lovecraft's 1936 novella, "The Shadow over Innsmouth".

Winter Tide was nominated for the 2018 Locus Award for Best First Novel, the 2018 Crawford Award, and the 2019 Mythopoeic Award in Adult Literature.

== Plot summary ==
Winter Tide is set in H. P. Lovecraft's Cthulhu Mythos universe. The Deep Ones are amphibious humans that once lived in the fictional port town of Innsmouth in New England. In Lovecraft's 1936 novella, "The Shadow over Innsmouth", the town's inhabitants, seen by many to be "frog-monsters", are rounded up by the United States government in 1928 and imprisoned in concentration camps in the western interior of the country. In Winter Tide's backstory, during World War II the captured Deep Ones are joined by Japanese Americans interred after the Attack on Pearl Harbor. At the end of the War, the Japanese, along with the remaining two Innsmouth survivors, siblings Aphra and Caleb Marsh, are released. All the other Deep Ones perished in the camps after being denied access to the ocean.

Aphra and Caleb live in San Francisco with the Kotos, a Japanese family they met in the camps. Aphra and Caleb do their best to keep their culture alive, but have no surviving relatives to support them and no longer have access to the books the Deep Ones kept in Innsmouth. In 1949 Aphra is approached by FBI agent Ron Spector for help in locating Russian agents researching Deep One magic to use against the Americans during the Cold War. In return, Spector offers her access to the fictional Miskatonic University libraries in New England that house the confiscated Deep One literature seized during the 1928 raid on Innsmouth. These books are considered "dangerous" by the government and very few people are allowed access to them. Aphra is suspicious of anyone in the government, but agrees to help the FBI agent in order to gain access to material she desperately needs, and the possibility of returning to Innsmouth.

== Background ==
In Winter Tide, I wanted to talk about how we rebuild community after genocide, and how rebuilt community is always changed from what we had before. And I wanted to talk about all those readers over the years who didn't question the Deep One concentration camps.

— Ruthanna Emrys.

Emrys said in interviews that in "The Shadow over Innsmouth", Lovecraft portrays the Deep Ones as monsters and deserving of their incarceration in concentration camps. In her Innsmouth Legacy series, Emrys chose to continue the story from the point of view of survivors from the camps. She added, "My own sympathy was squarely with the interned frog-monsters". Emrys said that while Lovecraft was quick to "demonize" anybody different, he occasionally gives readers "tantalizing glimpses of those Others" and their points of view. This opens the door to other interpretations of his stories. Emrys said she wanted to give these Others a voice.

Referring to Lovecraft's Cthulhu Mythos universe, Emrys said "playing in someone else's sandbox" comes with a responsibility to conform to the world Lovecraft and others have written about. "There's a responsibility, both to speak meaningfully about things that people have been talking about for decades, and to speak beyond those things".

== Critical reception ==
In a review in The Verge, Andrew Liptak called Winter Tide "an impressive book that updates Lovecraft’s creations with added nuance and empathy." He said it follows in the footsteps of books like Lovecraft Country by Matt Ruff, and The Ballad of Black Tom by Victor LaValle, which "invert ... Lovecraft’s tropes and legacy". Liptak added that while Lovecraft wrote of "unspeakable evils and anxieties lurking at the ends of the world", Emrys describes the "horrors of discrimination and hatred" in his universe. Liptak concluded that "Winter Tide bridges the gap between honoring a truly great shared world, and delivering an ironic comeuppance."

Megan M. McArdle wrote in Library Journal that Winter Tide is a mix of "Cold War paranoia and horror", and should interest Lovecraft fans. She said the "pacing is slow", but the characters, notably Aphra, are well developed. A review in Publishers Weekly described the novel as an "inventive dark fantasy [that] crossbreeds the cosmic horrors of the Cthulhu mythos with the espionage escapades of a Cold War thriller". The review said it is "historically relevant and resonant" for its sensitive handling of Aphra's experience and that of other outsiders.
