= Dark Descent Records =

Independent extreme metal record label

- Founded: 2009
- Founder: Matt Calvert
- Status: Active
- Genre: Extreme metal, death metal, black metal
- Location: Colorado Springs, Colorado
- Official website: darkdescentrecords.com

Dark Descent Records is a Colorado Springs, Colorado-based independent record label focused on extreme metal, namely the death and black metal varieties. It is one of the more prominent labels in the underground metal world, according to Decibel.

== History ==
Dark Descent Records was initially founded by Matt Calvert in 2009 to help a friend's band get their album distributed. Calvert said: "I went through a divorce and had gotten a second job to keep my mind off of things, and I had a few bucks laying around from that, so I told him I’d help him out. One thing led to another and, the way that I do it, I got a little obsessed and started signing bands, and here we are now." The label has since released albums by bands such as Blood Incantation. Other bands that have been signed to the label include Thantifaxath, Timeghoul, Nox Formulae, Crypt Sermon, Burial Invocation, Sheidim, Lie In Ruins, Phobocosm, Horrendous, Eleventh Ray, Pig's Blood, Gravehill, Spectral Voice, Binah, Ghoulgotha and Ripper.
