= Krypts =

Finnish death metal band

- Origin: Helsinki, Uusimaa
- Genres: Death metal, death-doom
- Years active: 2008–present
- Labels: Dark Descent Records, Detest Records, Me Saco Un Ojo Records
- Members: Otso Ukkonen; Ville Snicker; Antti Kotiranta; Jukka aho
- Past members: Topi Siirtola
- Website: Official Facebook page

Krypts is a Finnish death metal band from Helsinki, Uusimaa. Their first studio album, Unending Degradation, was released through Dark Descent Records on 19 February 2013.

== Band members ==
Current

- Otso Ukkonen - drums, guitars (2008–present)
- Ville Snicker - guitars (2008–present)
- Antti Kotiranta - vocals, bass (2008–present)
- Jukka Aho - guitars (2015–present)

Former

- Topi Siirtola - guitars (2009-2012)

Live musicians

- Rami Simelius - lead guitars (2013–2015)

== Discography ==
=== Studio albums ===
- Unending Degradation (2013)
- Remnants of Expansion (2016)
- Cadaver Circulation (2019)

=== EPs ===
- Krypts (2011)

Demos

- Open the Crypt (2009)
