= The Litany of Earth =

2014 fantasy novella by Ruthanna Emrys

- Author: Ruthanna Emrys
- Language: English
- Series: Innsmouth Legacy
- Genre: Fantasy; Lovecraftian horror
- Publisher: Tor.com
- Publication date: May 14, 2014
- Publication place: United States
- Followed by: Winter Tide

The Litany of Earth is a 2014 fantasy/horror fiction novella by American writer Ruthanna Emrys, first published on Tor.com. The first work in her series "The Innsmouth Legacy", it revisits the H. P. Lovecraft story "The Shadow over Innsmouth"

== Synopsis ==
Decades after the residents of Innsmouth were forced into internment camps by the United States government, Aphra Marsh discovers humans trying to replicate her people's secret mystical rituals.

== Reception ==
In a review for Io9, Charlie Jane Anders described The Litany of Earth as "a fascinating spin on the Cthulhu universe, in which the Deep Ones are real, and the government takes notice." In The Verge, Andrew Liptak describes The Litany of Earth as "helpful to read" before the Innsmouth Legacy series sequel Winter Tide, and describes both as works in which Emrys "subverts Lovecraft's notorious racism by making his monsters — which were often thinly veiled stand-ins for people of color — sympathetic protagonists." With regard to Litany of the Earth, Noah Berlatsky writes for The Verge, the "real horror in this story update isn’t fish-people; it's violent prejudice, as seen from the monsters’ perspective."

In a review of Imperfect Commentaries, a collection of 25 stories and poems by Emrys, Publishers Weekly writes, "Emrys's tales abound with magic and marvels, but her focus is on the nuances that define the humanity of her characters, seen most perceptibly in "The Litany of Earth," which introduces the protagonist of her novels Winter Tide (2017) and Deep Roots (2018): a descendant of the amphibious race in Lovecraft's "The Shadow over Innsmouth" whose persecution has echoes of the plight of contemporary refugees. The author's frequent feminist and queer spins on familiar fantasy tropes add an exhilarating freshness." The Litany of Earth was also listed on the Locus Magazine 2014 Locus Recommended Reading List.

== Honors and awards ==
- An analysis of the 2015 Hugo nominating ballots by Andrew Liptak of Io9 that corrected for the involvement of the Sad Puppies indicated that Litany of Earth could have been a finalist for that year's Hugo Award for Best Novelette.
- 2019 finalist for Mythopoeic Fantasy Award for Adult Literature (The Innsmouth Legacy series: The Litany of Earth, Winter Tide, Deep Roots)
