= H. P. Lovecraft: He Who Wrote in the Darkness =

2018 comic book by Alex Nikolavitch, Gervasio Benitez, Lara Lee and Carlos Aon

H. P. Lovecraft: He Who Wrote in the Darkness (Howard P. Lovecraft. Celui qui écrivait dans les ténèbres)
- Page count: 109 pages
- Publisher: 21g

Creative team
- Writer: Alex Nikolavitch
- Artist: Lara Lee; Gervasio Benitez; Carlos Aon

Original publication
- Date of publication: 28 February 2018
- Language: French
- ISBN: 9791093111216

Translation
- Publisher: Pegasus
- Date: 2018
- ISBN: 978-1-68177-855-6
- Translator: Ivanka Hahnenberger

H. P. Lovecraft: He Who Wrote in the Darkness (French: Howard P. Lovecraft. Celui qui écrivait dans les ténèbres) is a 2018 French comic book written by Alex Nikolavitch and illustrated by Lara Lee, Gervasio Benitez and Carlos Aon. It is a biography about the American horror writer H. P. Lovecraft, focusing on his friendships with people such as Robert E. Howard and Harry Houdini and the inspirations for his stories.

The book was published in French by 21g on 28 February 2018. It appeared in English translation the same year. Publishers Weekly called it "well-crafted and clear" with "expressive character designs", but wrote that it "dodges the hard questions in favor of friendlier anecdotes", for example by skipping over Lovecraft's relationship with his estranged wife Sonia.
