= The Gothic Archies =

American indie rock band

- Genres: Indie pop, gothic rock
- Years active: 1996–present
- Label: Nonesuch/Elektra Records
- Members: Stephin Merritt, Daniel Handler
- Website: Official website

The Gothic Archies are an American indie rock/gothic rock band established by Stephin Merritt of The Magnetic Fields. In 1997, Merritt released The New Despair. The EP featured the song "Your Long White Fingers", which appeared frequently in the Nickelodeon series The Adventures of Pete & Pete.

The band later became more prominent when Merritt wrote, performed and recorded songs for the audiobook versions of Lemony Snicket's A Series of Unfortunate Events. A collection of thirteen songs based on each book and two additional tracks was released as The Tragic Treasury on October 10, 2006, to coincide with the release of the final book in the series. The Gothic Archies briefly toured to promote the album featuring Merritt on ukulele and Daniel Handler on accordion. In 2002, The Gothic Archies composed original music for the audiobook version of Neil Gaiman's Coraline.

== Discography ==
- Looming in the Gloom (1996)
- The New Despair (1997)
- The Tragic Treasury: Songs from A Series of Unfortunate Events (2006)
