= Deathless (Revocation album) =

Studio album by Revocation
- Released: October 14, 2014
- Recorded: April – May 2014
- Studio: Planet Z in Hadley, Massachusetts, United States; Dexters Lab Recording in Milford, Connecticut, United States
- Genre: Technical thrash metal, progressive death metal
- Length: 48:31
- Label: Metal Blade
- Producer: Zeuss

Revocation chronology
Revocation (2013)	Deathless (2014)	Great Is Our Sin (2016)

Professional ratings
Review scores
Source	Rating
Lambgoat	8/10
Metal Injection	8/10
AntiHero Magazine	9.3/10

Deathless is the fifth studio album by the American technical death metal band Revocation, released on October 14, 2014 by Metal Blade Records. It is the band's last album to feature Phil Dubois-Coyne on drums.

The album entered the US Billboard 200 at #124, selling 3,075 copies in the first week.

== Track listing ==
All lyrics are written by Davidson, except where noted; all music is composed by Davidson, except where noted.

No.	Title	Lyrics	Music	Length
1.	"A Debt Owed to the Grave"			4:52
2.	"Deathless"			4:57
3.	"Labyrinth of Eyes"			4:46
4.	"Madness Opus"			6:23
5.	"Scorched Earth Policy"			3:47
6.	"The Blackest Reaches"		Gargiulo	4:07
7.	"The Fix"	Dubois-Coyne	Gargiulo	3:14
8.	"United in Helotry"	Dubois-Coyne		5:14
9.	"Apex"	[instrumental]		5:12
10.	"Witch Trials"			6:05
Total length:				48:31

Deluxe Version Bonus Track
No.	Title	Writer(s)	Length
11.	"Sworn to Black" (Morbid Angel cover)	Trey Azagthoth, David Vincent	4:02
Total length:			52:33

== Personnel ==
Writing, performance and production credits are adapted from the album liner notes.

=== Revocation ===
- David Davidson – lead guitar, lead vocals
- Dan Gargiulo – rhythm guitar, backing vocals
- Brett Bamberger – bass
- Phil Dubois-Coyne – drums

=== Production ===
- Zeuss – production, engineering, mixing
- Alan Douches – mastering

=== Artwork and design ===
- Tom Strom – cover art
- Brian J. Ames – layout

== Chart performance ==
Chart (2014)	Peak position
US Billboard 200	124
US Independent Albums (Billboard)	25
US Top Hard Rock Albums (Billboard)	10
US Heatseekers Albums (Billboard)	1
US Top Rock Albums (Billboard)	39
