= Deep Roots (novel) =

2018 novel by Ruthanna Emrys

- First edition cover
- Author: Ruthanna Emrys
- Cover artist: John Jude Palencar
- Language: English
- Series: Innsmouth Legacy
- Release number: 3
- Genres: Alternate history Lovecraftian horror fantasy
- Publisher: Tor Books
- Publication date: July 10, 2018
- Publication place: United States
- Media type: Hardback
- Pages: 346
- ISBN: 978-0-7653-9093-6
- Preceded by: Winter Tide

Deep Roots is a 2018 alternate history, fantasy and horror novel by American science fiction and fantasy writer Ruthanna Emrys. It is the third book in Emrys' three book Innsmouth Legacy series, after The Litany of Earth (2014) and Winter Tide (2017). The series is set in the Cthulhu Mythos universe created by H. P. Lovecraft, and builds on Lovecraft's 1936 novella, "The Shadow over Innsmouth".

Deep Roots was nominated for the 2019 Locus Award for Best Fantasy Novel, the 2019 Dragon Award for Best Fantasy Novel, and the 2019 Mythopoeic Award in Adult Literature.

== Plot summary ==
After the events in Winter Tide, siblings Aphra and Caleb Marsh decide to return to their people's fictional hometown of Innsmouth in New England, and rebuild it before property developers move in. They search for other Deep Ones and "mistbloods" (half-Deep Ones) who may have fled Innsmouth before the government raid in 1928, and this leads them to New York City. There Aphra finds a cousin, Freddy Laverne, but discovers that he has been associating with an old enemy, the Outer Ones. She also discovers that some of her people are disappearing.

== Critical reception ==
A review of Deep Roots in Publishers Weekly called the book an "absorbing continuation" of Emrys' Innsmouth Legacy series and its "treatment of cultural identities in conflict". The review said readers will appreciate her "subtle references to Lovecraft’s stories and her dexterous use of his tales’ set pieces for her own imaginative goals." Kristi Chadwick wrote in Library Journal that Deep Roots is "even more action-packed" than its predecessor. She said it is a "well-crafted" book, and "continues to take H. P. Lovecraft's Cthulhu mythos in a new direction, echoing the themes of immigrants and governmental reaction." In a review in Booklist, Emily Whitmore described Deep Roots as "a marvel of a fantasy novel". She said that while Emrys is faithful to Lovecraft's universe, the author "takes [his] world and flips it on its head to fit her needs."

A review on the Los Angeles Public Library website stated that Deep Roots and its prequel, Winter Tide are not just "horror novels", but "explorations of identity, culture, family, both by blood and those we create ourselves". The review said they are "presented with a nice dose of magic and discovery, and executed with a wonderful sense of the period in which [they are] set." The books feature "monsters", but they are not the monstrosities Lovecraft created during his time. The reviewer said Winter Tide and Deep Roots are "complex and compelling works of fantasy that help illuminate not only where we’ve been, but also where we are."
