= Ruthanna Emrys =

American science fiction and fantasy writer

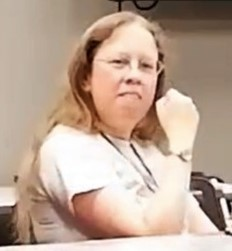
- Emrys at a panel in 2018
- Occupation: Author
- Writing career
- Genres: Science fiction and fantasy
- Notable works: The Innsmouth Legacy series: The Litany of Earth, Winter Tide, and Deep Roots
- Website: ruthannaemrys.com

Ruthanna Emrys is an American science fiction and fantasy writer best known for The Innsmouth Legacy series: The Litany of Earth, Winter Tide, and Deep Roots.

== Biography ==
Emrys is a contributor to science fiction and fantasy magazines, including Strange Horizons, Analog, and Tor.com. She has also written under the name R. Emrys Gordon. She has cited Geraldine Brooks, Octavia E. Butler, Marge Piercy, and Robert Anton Wilson as influences on her writing.

She is best known for The Innsmouth Legacy series, which has Winter Tide as its first novel. In The Verge, Andrew Liptak discusses Winter Tide, writing "Along with a previous novelette called The Litany of Earth, it subverts Lovecraft's notorious racism by making his monsters - which were often thinly veiled stand-ins for people of color - sympathetic protagonists." In a review of Winter Tide, Liptak further explains The Litany of Earth is "helpful to read before Winter Tide; it provides a bit of context for the world, and for Aphra's situation. It's free online, and included in the ebook edition." With regard to Litany of the Earth, Noah Berlatsky writes for The Verge the "real horror in this story update isn’t fish-people; it's violent prejudice, as seen from the monsters’ perspective."

In 2017, Emrys spoke with NPR, stating "In Winter Tide, I wanted to talk about how we rebuild community after genocide, and how rebuilt community is always changed from what we had before. And I wanted to talk about all those readers over the years who didn't question the Deep One concentration camps." Publishers Weekly writes in its review of Winter Tide, "Emrys’s characters are more openly comfortable with the supernatural than Lovecraft's horror-struck mortals, and her sensitive comparisons of Aphra's experience to those of other confined and displaced peoples make the novel historically relevant and resonant." Ana Grilo writes for the Kirkus Reviews blog that Winter Tide "offers a Lovecraftian tale with Lovecraftian mythos, without Lovecraftian racism."

A review of Deep Roots by a librarian posted to the Los Angeles Public Library website states "Winter Tide and Deep Roots are complex and compelling works of fantasy that help illuminate not only where we’ve been, but also where we are. While they are based on the works of a known racist, these books feature characters that are diverse and inclusive." In a review of Deep Roots for Booklist, Emily Whitmore writes, "Once more, Emrys is true to the world of Lovecraft, and fans will appreciate her attentiveness to the Cthulhu mythos even as she takes the world and flips it on its head to fit her needs."

In a review of Imperfect Commentaries, a collection of 25 stories and poems, Publishers Weekly writes, "Emrys's tales abound with magic and marvels, but her focus is on the nuances that define the humanity of her characters, seen most perceptibly in "The Litany of Earth," which introduces the protagonist of her novels Winter Tide (2017) and Deep Roots (2018): a descendant of the amphibious race in Lovecraft's "The Shadow over Innsmouth" whose persecution has echoes of the plight of contemporary refugees. The author's frequent feminist and queer spins on familiar fantasy tropes add an exhilarating freshness." Jason Puckett writes in a review for Library Journal, ""Aliens" here means many things: literal serpentine extraterrestrials, but also strange gods adopting human form, and, most interestingly, semi-human outsiders assimilating into American culture and humans undergoing transformations into new or very old things."

In 2022, Emrys published A Half-Built Garden – a first-contact novel set in a near-future world, where decentralized, self-governed watershed networks managed to replace corporations and nation states as the primary means of societal organization. While these networks managed to start a journey of recovery from climate change and environmental damage, the arrival of alien species threatens both this progress and the new balance of power. The novel is praised for its interesting solarpunk world-building.

As of 2026, she lived in the Netherlands. She previously lived near Washington, D.C., with her wife and children, in a large collective household/small queer commune. In an interview she said, "This has definitely influenced the families I write about!"

== Honors and awards ==
- 2017 Romantic Times Book Reviews 2017 Reviewer's Choice Awards nominee (Winter Tide)
- 2018 Crawford Award shortlist (Winter Tide)
- 2018 finalist for Locus Award for Best First Novel (Winter Tide)
- 2019 finalist for Mythopoeic Fantasy Award for Adult Literature (The Innsmouth Legacy series: The Litany of Earth, Winter Tide, Deep Roots)

== Bibliography ==
=== The Innsmouth Legacy ===
- The Litany of Earth (2014)
- Winter Tide (2017)
- Deep Roots (2018)

=== Collections ===
- Imperfect Commentaries (2019)

=== Chapbooks ===
- The Litany of Earth (2014)
- Seven Commentaries on an Imperfect Land (2014)

=== Short fiction ===
- "Exposure Therapy" (2007)
- "Ghosts and Simulations" (2007)
- "Memorial" (2008)
- "Correspondence" (2010)
- "Brief Candle" (2010)
- "The Jester's Child" (2013)
- "Seven Commentaries on an Imperfect Land" (2014)
- "The Deepest Rift" (2015)
- "Those Who Watch" (2016)
- "The Word of Flesh and Soul" (2018)
- "All That Means or Mourns" (2025)

=== Other novels ===
- A Half-Built Garden (2022)

=== Poems ===
- "Pantheon" (2013)
- "The Serpent Explains the Nature of Tricksters to His Wife" (2013)

== See also ==
- Cthulhu Mythos
- H. P. Lovecraft
- The Shadow over Innsmouth
