= Revocation (band) =

American technical death metal band

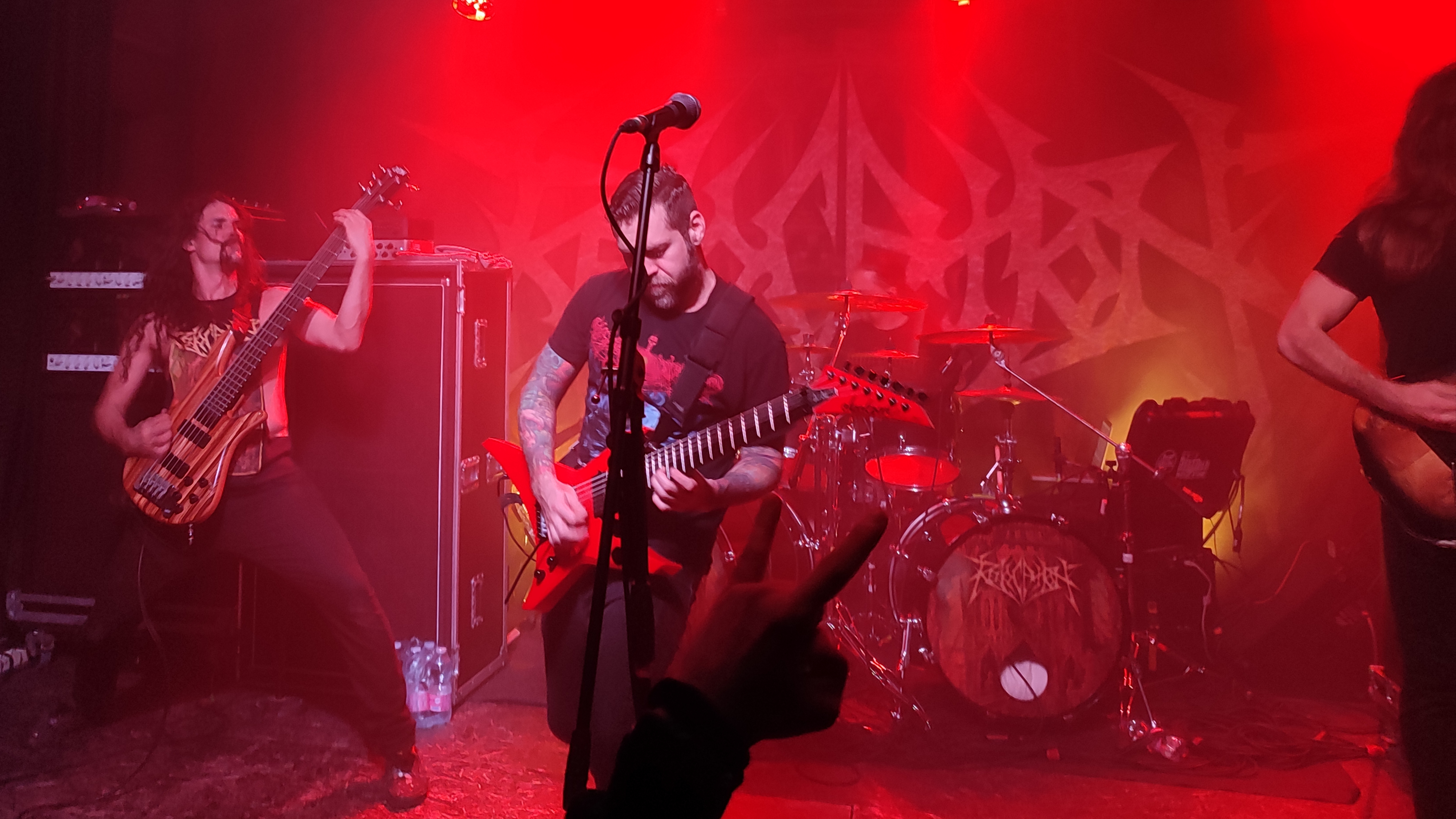
- Revocation live in Bologna in 2023

Background information
- Also known as: Cryptic Warning (2000–2006)
- Origin: Boston, Massachusetts, U.S.
- Genres: Technical death metal; thrash metal; progressive death metal
- Years active: 2000–present
- Labels: Relapse, Scion A/V, Metal Blade
- Members: Dave Davidson; Ash Pearson; Harry Lannon; Alex Weber
- Past members: Anthony Buda; Phil Dubois-Coyne; Dan Gargiulo; Brett Bamberger

Revocation is an American extreme metal band from Boston, Massachusetts, currently consisting of lead guitarist and lead vocalist Dave Davidson, drummer Ash Pearson, rhythm guitarist Harry Lannon and bassist Alex Weber. The band has released nine studio albums, two EPs, and seventeen music videos.

== History ==
=== Background (Cryptic Warning) (2000–2005) ===
In 2000, guitarist/vocalist Dave Davidson, drummer Phil Dubois-Coyne, and bassist Anthony Buda, met in high school in Boston, Massachusetts. Influenced by Guns N' Roses and Metallica, the trio formed Cryptic Warning and recorded a demo in 2002, gaining an underground following in and around Boston. A second demo, Internally Reviled, was recorded in 2004. In 2005, Cryptic Warning recorded and released an independent album, Sanity's Aberration, but were unhappy with the production. Davidson said, "We didn't record the album with a metal guy, so we didn't get the sound we wanted. The heaviest reference in our producer's discography was The Cult. A lot of people still love that record—our old-school fans who used to show up for all of the shows—but to us, we weren't really satisfied with the production of that. We felt it was one of the mistakes we made."

=== First four albums (2006–2013) ===
In 2006, Cryptic Warning renamed to Revocation with the same lineup. Davidson commented, "I think, looking a little deeper into it, we made a lot of mistakes with Cryptic Warning. We were younger and didn't really know what we were doing, so Revocation was us starting fresh with a clean slate and revoking our past mistakes." Revocation recorded the three-song demo Summon the Spawn, and in 2008 they recorded their first full-length album, Empire of the Obscene. The full length was self-released, and the band financed its own tour, attracting the interest of several record labels. Revocation signed to Relapse Records.

The band played regional shows before recording their second full-length album, Existence Is Futile, released on September 29, 2009. Allmusic described the album as "one of the best pure metal albums of 2009", while Spin magazine named Revocation one of the ten artists to watch in 2010. In October 2009, the band performed for the Relapse showcase at CMJ Music Marathon. On August 16, 2011, the band released their third full-length album, Chaos of Forms. Their fourth full-length studio release, self-titled Revocation, was released on August 6, 2013.

=== Deathless and Great Is Our Sin (2014–2016) ===
In early April 2014, Revocation signed with Metal Blade Records and began recording a new album. The band's fifth full-length, Deathless, was released on October 14, 2014. Revocation embarked on a fall tour in the U.S. with Crowbar, Havok, Fit For An Autopsy, and Armed for Apocalypse. Following that, they toured Europe with Cannibal Corpse and Aeon.

In September 2015, the band announced that Empire of the Obscene would be re-issued on November 13, 2015, via Metal Blade Records. Remixed and remastered, the album included bonus tracks from their 2006 EP, Summon the Spawn.

In May 2016, the band announced their sixth studio album, Great Is Our Sin. The album was released on July 22, 2016, via Metal Blade Records.

=== The Outer Ones and Netherheaven (2017–present) ===
The band toured the US in the spring of 2017, supporting Morbid Angel and Suffocation along with Withered. On November 13, 2017, Davidson told Metal Injection that writing had begun on the band's next album, planned to be released in 2018. On February 5, 2018, the band hinted that recording had begun via posts on the band's various social media outlets. On April 5, 2018, the band announced that they had completed tracking for the new album at Planet Z Studios. On May 15, 2018, the band teased 20 seconds of a new song and what appeared to be a release date of September 28, 2018.

On June 5, 2018, the band revealed the title of their seventh album, The Outer Ones, released on September 28, 2018, via Metal Blade. The band announced their second-ever North American headline tour in September and October 2018, with Exhumed, Rivers of Nihil and Yautja as support acts.

On July 10, 2018, the band revealed the track listing and cover artwork of The Outer Ones, along with a music video for first single "Of Unworldly Origin".

On June 20, 2020, rhythm guitarist Dan Gargiulo left the band to "focus on other musical and life endeavors". It was announced that the band were working on their eighth album as a trio.

On June 16, 2022, Revocation announced that their new album would be titled Netherheaven. On July 6, it was revealed the album would be released on September 9, and the album's first single, "Diabolical Majesty," was also released.

Revocation were performing at the Apollo Theatre (Belvidere, Illinois) with Morbid Angel and Crypta during the tornado outbreak of March 31 – April 1, 2023. An EF1 tornado struck the venue, which caused a roof collapse that killed at least one person and injured dozens others, though the bands were unharmed.

The band performed at Milwaukee Metal Fest in 2025.

== Musical style and influences ==
The music of Revocation has been described by journalists as a fusion of technical death metal and thrash metal, as well as progressive death metal. The characteristics that define Revocation's sound include a "complex guitar-bass interplay" of dissonant riffs, bass breaks and "shredding" guitar solos united by "galloping" double bass drums, death metal tempos, hard rock breakdowns and grooves. Vocals range from death growls to grindcore screams, while "still recognizable as a human voice". Starting with the self-titled album, the band has been using seven-string guitars to expand their range.

Music critics have pointed out that Davidson's guitar playing style is the prominent aspect of Revocation's sound. Davidson developed his playing technique by attending the Berklee College of Music, where he studied jazz guitar performance. This musical education brought him an expertise in both playing and songwriting, while "some of the atonal aspects of jazz gave him a different perspective on composing and soloing."

Recalling his earliest influences, Davidson cites Slash, Dimebag Darrell, and Marty Friedman. Davidson says that as a band, Revocation has a wide range of influences, and among these are groups such as Children of Bodom, Exhorder, Dark Angel, Slayer, Megadeth, Pestilence, Atheist, Gorguts, Forbidden, Spastic Ink, Martyr, and Exodus. Davidson has also cited the "raw energy" of the DIY metal shows in the Boston underground scene as an inspiration to get proactive and get the band working.

Regarding the band's rhythm section, critics have different opinions; while About.com stated that Buda and Dubois-Coyne "practice their own brutal brand of stop-on-a-dime precision with merciless intensity", Decibel magazine wrote that when Davidson is soloing, "the rest of band often fails to compensate." In contrast Allmusic said: "Perhaps the most astonishing thing about Revocation, though, is that they're a trio."

Following the addition of Dan Gargiulo as rhythm guitarist in 2010, Revocation's sound adopted more two-guitar sections, with Gargiulo also providing songwriting credits on each release since Teratogenesis (2012). Gargiulo has cited classical guitar as a stronger influence in his songwriting, as opposed to the heavy jazz influence in Davidson's songs.

== Members ==
Current members

- David Davidson – lead guitar, lead vocals (2006–present)
- Ash Pearson – drums (2015–present)
- Harry Lannon – rhythm guitar, backing vocals (2025–present; touring 2023–2025)
- Alex Weber – bass, backing vocals (2025–present)

Former members

- Anthony Buda – bass, backing vocals (2006–2012)
- Phil Dubois-Coyne – drums (2006–2015)
- Dan Gargiulo – rhythm guitar, backing vocals (2010–2020)
- Brett Bamberger – bass (2012–2025)

Live musicians

- Jon "The Charn" Rice – drums (2014)
- Alex Rüdinger – drums (2015)
- Toby Swope – drums (2015)
- Noah Young – rhythm guitar, backing vocals (2022–2023)

== Discography ==
Revocation discography
- Studio albums: 9
- Extended plays: 2
- Music videos: 17

=== Studio albums ===
List of studio albums, with selected chart positions
Title	Album details	Peak chart positions				
Title	Album details	US	US Heat.	US Indie.	US Rock	US Hard Rock
Empire of the Obscene	Released: February 12, 2008; Label: independent, Metal Blade (re-released); Format: CD, digital download	—	—	—	—	—
Existence Is Futile	Released: September 29, 2009; Label: Relapse; Format: CD, digital download	—	—	—	—	—
Chaos of Forms	Released: August 16, 2011; Label: Relapse; Format: CD, LP, digital download	—	24	—	—	—
Revocation	Released: August 6, 2013; Label: Relapse; Format: CD, LP, digital download	159	4	35	44	15
Deathless	Released: October 14, 2014; Label: Metal Blade; Format: CD, LP, digital download	124	1	25	39	10
Great Is Our Sin	Released: July 22, 2016; Label: Metal Blade; Format: CD, LP, digital download	189	1	12	17	6
The Outer Ones	Released: September 28, 2018; Label: Metal Blade; Format: CD, LP, digital download	46	4	11	—	23
Netherheaven	Released: September 9, 2022; Label: Metal Blade; Format: CD, LP, digital download	—	—	—	—	—
New Gods, New Masters	Released: September 26, 2025; Label: Metal Blade; Format: CD, LP, digital download	—	—	—	—	—
"—" denotes a recording that did not chart

=== EPs ===
List of EPs
Title	EP details
Summon the Spawn	Released: September 2006; Label: Independent; Format: CD
Teratogenesis	Released: September 25, 2012; Label: Scion A/V; Format: Digital download

=== Music videos ===
List of music videos, showing year released and director
Year	Title	Director(s)
2009	"Dismantle the Dictator"	David Brodsky
2010	"ReaniManiac"	Kevin Juliff
2011	"No Funeral"	David Brodsky
2012	"The Grip Tightens"	David Brodsky
2013	"Invidious"	David Brodsky
2013	"Fracked"	Madeline Quinn
2014	"Deathless"	David Brodsky
2016	"Arbiters of the Apocalypse"	David Brodsky
2018	"Of Unworldly Origin"	David Brodsky, Dave Davidson
2019	"Vanitas"	Jon Topore, Dave Davidson
2022	"Diabolical Majesty"	David Brodsky
2022	"Nihilistic Violence"	David Brodsky
2023	"Godforsaken"	David Brodsky
2025	"Confines of Infinity"	David Brodsky
2025	"Cronenberged"	David Brodsky
2025	"Dystopian Vermin"	David Brodsky
2026	"Data Corpse"	David Brodsky
