= Crypt Sermon =

American heavy metal group

Crypt Sermon is a heavy/doom metal band from Philadelphia. Some of the band's members are involved with projects such as Horrendous, Daeva, and The Silver. Some of their lyrical topics include orthodoxy and the occult.

== Discography ==
=== Albums ===
- Out of the Garden (2015)
- The Ruins of Fading Light (2019)
- The Stygian Rose (2024)

=== Extended plays ===
- Demo MMXIII (2013)
- Saturnian Appendices (2025)
