= Existence Is Futile (Revocation album) =

Studio album by Revocation
- Released: September 29, 2009
- Recorded: 2009
- Studio: Damage Studios in Southbridge, Massachusetts, United States
- Genre: Technical death metal, thrash metal
- Length: 47:21
- Label: Relapse Records
- Producer: Peter Rutcho and Revocation

Revocation chronology
Empire of the Obscene (2008)	Existence Is Futile (2009)	Chaos of Forms (2011)

Professional ratings
Review scores
Source	Rating
AllMusic	4.5/5 stars

Existence Is Futile is the second studio album by the American technical death metal band Revocation. The album was released September 29, 2009, by Relapse Records.

== Information ==
The album was described by Allmusic as one of the best pure metal albums in 2009.

== Track listing ==
No.	Title	Length
1.	"Enter the Hall"	2:27
2.	"Pestilence Reigns"	4:33
3.	"Deathonomics"	3:42
4.	"Existence Is Futile"	4:50
5.	"The Brain Scramblers"	3:11
6.	"Across Forests and Fjords"	4:16
7.	"ReaniManiac"	3:18
8.	"Dismantle the Dictator"	3:57
9.	"Anthem of the Betrayed"	5:16
10.	"Leviathan Awaits"	4:48
11.	"The Tragedy of Modern Ages"	7:03
Total length:		47:21

Deluxe edition bonus track
No.	Title	Length
12.	"Death in Vain" (Exhorder cover)	4:27
Total length:		51:48

== Personnel ==
Revocation

- David Davidson - guitars, lead vocals
- Anthony Buda - bass, backing vocals
- Phil Dubois-Coyne - drums
