= Julian Simpson =

British writer and director

Julian Simpson is a British writer and director working in film, television and audio. He is best known for his radio plays for BBC Radio, most of which take place within his "Pleasant Green" universe with loose connections to each other. These include The Lovecraft Investigations series, based on the works of H. P. Lovecraft.

Simpson's other works include writing and directing the 1999 film The Criminal, released when he was 23, and the 2013 audio play Kokomo; he also wrote and/or directed for television, including episodes of 24, Doctor Who, Hustle, The Inspector Lynley Mysteries, New Tricks, and Spooks. Some of his most frequent audio collaborators include actress Nicola Walker, featured in all of his Pleasant Green works, actress Phoebe Fox, and producer Karen Rose.

Simpson began working on New Tricks Series 5 in 2008, directing two episodes of the show that year and going to write and direct one to three episodes each season until the show's cancellation in 2015. In 2012, during the production of Series 10, Simpson took to Twitter to criticise actor Amanda Redman after Redman complained that the series' writing had become "bland."

== Pleasant Green universe ==
The Pleasant Green Universe is a series of loosely connected radio plays that focus upon strange occurrences. As of 2025, it is made up of eight dramas, beginning with Fragments.

=== Fragments ===
Fragments was first aired on BBC Radio 4 on 31 August 2007 as part of its Friday Drama series. The play is set in the village of Pleasant Green, which has become increasingly gentrified and exclusive. John Grant (John Carlisle), a seventy-year-old retired Royal Marine, is found shot dead. Teenager Kelly Ryan does not deny that she committed the murder, though she gives sarcastic, mocking responses to police questions about her motive. Grant had placed listening devices throughout the village, and the story is told through snippets of the recordings he made, Kelly's police interviews and the detectives' conversations about their investigation.

The cast featured John Carlisle, Lesley Sharp, Philip Glenister, Sarah Smart, Daniel Ryan, Sean Gallagher, Nicola Walker, and Will Keen.

=== The Listener ===
The Listener first aired on BBC Radio 4 on 8 January 2010 as part of its Friday Drama series. The story's plot centres upon a police agent, Mark, who is left without any memories of his past but fears that he may actually be a brainwashed terrorist. As the story progresses he discovers that neither personality is genuine and that he's an undercover agent who habitually has his mind wiped and reprogrammed to assist the government in solving cases.

The cast featured Mark Bazeley, Indira Varma, Nicola Walker, Mark Lewis Jones, Jimmy Akingbola, and Paul Panting.

=== Bad Memories ===
Bad Memories aired on BBC Radio 4 on 7 January 2011 and received the Best Use of Sound in an Audio Drama Award at the 2012 BBC Audio Drama Awards. The story involves the mysterious disappearance of the Blake family around 2004 and the discovery of their bodies in the modern day. Forensic tests show that they died in 1926 and were found with audio files. Attempts to retrieve the recordings reveal that the family and a visitor was spirited away by Mary Marston, a coma patient believed to have murdered her family.

The cast featured Nicola Walker, Rupert Graves, Steven Mackintosh, Jana Carpenter, Anthony Calf, Imogen McCurdy, Oscar Richardson, Rohan Nijhawan, and Ted Powell.

=== Kokomo ===
Kokomo aired on BBC Radio 4 on 5 June 2013. The story centres on an incident of cyber-terrorism.

The cast featured Robert Glenister, Rufus Wright, Tim McInnerny, Louise Brealey, Hermione Norris, and Nicola Walker.

=== Fugue State ===
Fugue State was broadcast on 29 October 2015 on BBC Radio 4. The story starts with attempts to extract the memories of a government agent who had gone to Pleasant Green to investigate a new numbers station, only to end up in a fugue state. As the story progresses it is revealed that the station was an attempt by otherworldly beings to communicate, only for the communication to be too much for the human brain and consciousness to comprehend. Ultimately the agent, as well as some of the medical workers trying to extract his memories, evolve to a new state of being. This story introduces the character of Johnson, who also appears in the series Mythos.

Fugue State was shortlisted for and won the 2016 Tinniswood Award. The cast featured Nicola Walker, Steven Mackintosh, Tim McInnerny, Ferdinand Kingsley, Phoebe Fox, and Ben Crowe.

=== Mythos ===
Mythos is a drama series made up of three episodes: "Mythos," "Glamis," and "Albion". The series revolves around upon a secretive government agency that investigates supernatural and otherworldly threats, real or perceived, to the world. One of the people working for the agency is Marie Lairre, the ghost of a nun that used to haunt Borley Rectory. She reports to Johnson, the government agent from Fugue State. The first episode features her looking for a spell book in a remote village, while the second has her exploring a secret door in a Scottish castle and taking on a new partner.

The first episode aired on 5 April 2017 on BBC Radio 4 and the second and third episodes aired on the same channel on 25 and 26 April 2018, respectively. The cast for the series included Nicola Walker, Tim McInnerny, Jonathan Bailey, Steven Mackintosh, David Calder, Emma Fielding, Hugh Ross, Phoebe Fox, Jana Carpenter, David Holt, Tracy-Ann Oberman, and David Collings.

A fourth episode, The Village was released after crowdfunding, in April 2026, with Walker, Fox and McInnerny reprising their roles.

=== The Lovecraft Investigations ===
The Lovecraft Investigations, also known as The Mystery Machine, is a podcast made up of four series, each of which is loosely based on stories by H. P. Lovecraft. The first series, based on the story The Case of Charles Dexter Ward, began airing in January 2019 on BBC Radio 4 and ran for ten episodes. The second series was based on the novella The Whisperer in Darkness and ran for nine episodes with two bonus episodes/teases beginning in November 2019. The third series, based on The Shadow Over Innsmouth, ran for eight episodes with three bonus episodes in December 2020. In 2023, a fourth series, based on The Haunter of the Dark, was released. Crowley, a standalone crowdfunded documentary series about Aleister Crowley was released at the end of March 2026.

Critical reception for The Lovecraft Investigations has been positive. The Verge called the first series "like Serial mixed with True Detective" and it also received praise from The Spectator.

=== Who is Aldrich Kemp? ===
This five-part drama started airing on Radio 4 on 18 February 2022. The cast again includes Phoebe Fox, Nicola Walker, Jana Carpenter, and Tim McInnerny. The story centres upon attempts by Fox's character Clara Page to determine who and where is the titular Aldrich Kemp.

In April 2023, the BBC broadcast a five-part sequel series, entitled Who Killed Aldrich Kemp?. A third five part series, Aldrich Kemp and the Rose of Pamir, was broadcast by the BBC in November and December 2024.

== Selected filmography ==
=== Film ===
- 1999: The Criminal (director / writer)

=== Television ===
- 2001: Cutting Edge: "I Confess" (director)
- 2004: Murder Prevention (director: episodes 3 and 4)
- 2005: In Divine Proportion (screenplay)
- 2005: The Inspector Lynley Mysteries (director: "Word of God"; writer: "In Divine Proportion")
- 2005: Spooks (director: series 4, episodes 9 and 10)
- 2006: Spooks (director: series 5, episodes 3 and 8; writer: episode 8)
- 2008: Final Curtain (director)
- 2007: Superstorm
- 2008: Hotel Babylon (director: series 3, episodes 1, 2, and 3)
- 2009: Hustle (director: series 5, episodes 3 and 4)
- 2010: Dead Man Talking (director / writer)
- 2011: Doctor Who (director: episodes "The Almost People" and "The Rebel Flesh")
- 2014: 24: Live Another Day (2nd unit director)
- 2008–2015: New Tricks (director: 17 episodes; writer: 13 episodes)

== Selected awards ==
Year	Work	Award	Category	Notes	Result	Ref.
2001	The Criminal	Fantasporto	Best Director		Won	
2001	The Criminal	London International Film Festival	Best New Director		Nominated	
2012	Bad Memories	BBC Audio Drama Awards	Best Use of Sound in an Audio Drama		Won	
2016	Fugue State	BBC Audio Drama Awards	Best Use of Sound in an Audio Drama	with David Thomas	Won	
2016	Fugue State	BBC Audio Drama Awards	Tinniswood Award	as writer	Won	
