= The Case of Charles Dexter Ward =

1941 horror novel by H. P. Lovecraft

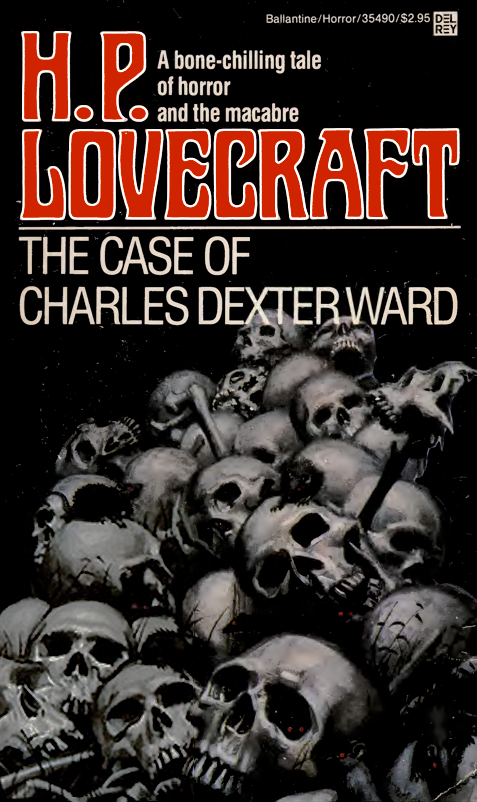
- First Ballantine Books Edition
- Author: H. P. Lovecraft
- Language: English
- Genre: Horror
- Published in: Weird Tales
- Publication date: May–July 1941
- Publication place: United States
- Media type: Periodical
- Text: The Case of Charles Dexter Ward at Wikisource

The Case of Charles Dexter Ward is a short horror novel (51,500 words) by American writer H. P. Lovecraft, written in early 1927, but not published during the author's lifetime. Set in Lovecraft's hometown of Providence, Rhode Island, it was first published (in abridged form) in the May and July issues of Weird Tales in 1941; the first complete publication was in Arkham House's Beyond the Wall of Sleep collection (1943). It is included in the Library of America volume of Lovecraft's work.

The novel, set in 1928, describes how Charles Dexter Ward becomes obsessed with his distant ancestor, Joseph Curwen, an alleged wizard with unsavory habits. Ward physically resembles Curwen, and he attempts to duplicate his ancestor's Qabalistic and alchemical feats. He eventually uses this knowledge to physically resurrect Curwen. Ward's doctor, Marinus Bicknell Willett, investigates Ward's activities and is horrified by what he finds.

== Plot summary ==
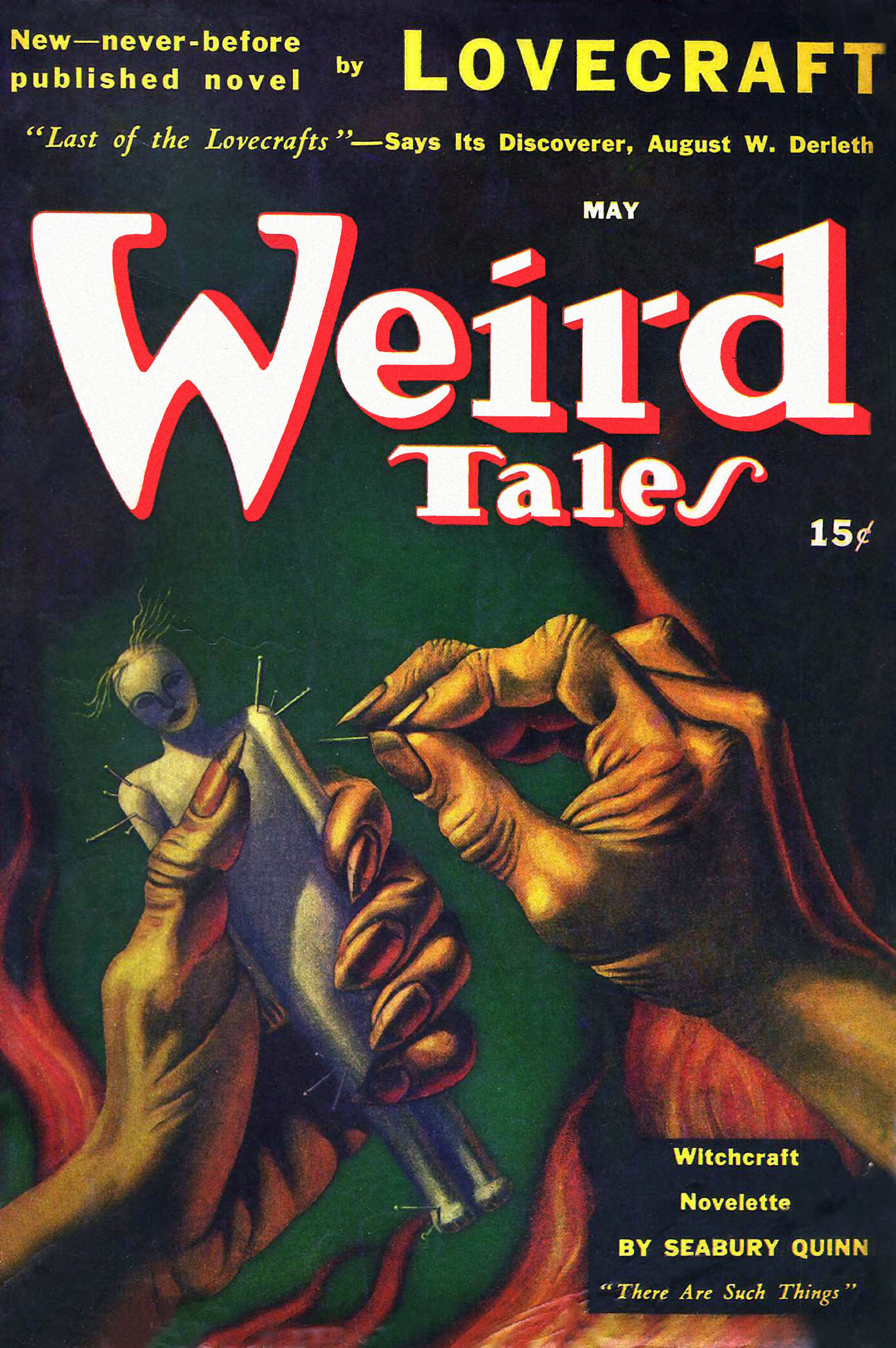
The first installment of The Case of Charles Dexter Ward was promoted with an outsized banner headline on the cover of Weird Tales.

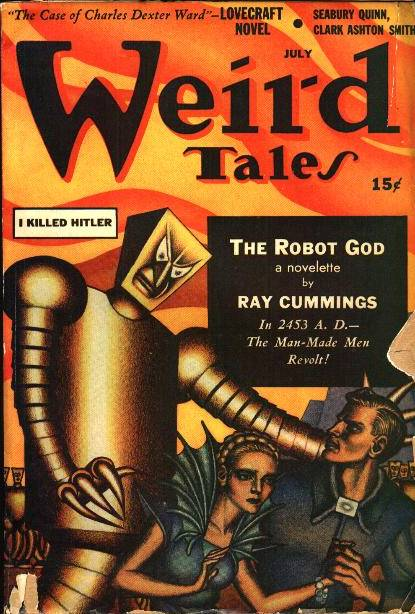
The second installment received a less prominent headline.

Charles Dexter Ward is a young man from a prominent Rhode Island family who has disappeared from a mental asylum. He had been incarcerated during a prolonged period of insanity, during which he exhibited minor and inexplicable physiological changes. His empty cell is found to be very dusty. The bulk of the story concerns the investigation conducted by the Wards' family doctor, Marinus Bicknell Willett, in an attempt to discover the reason for Ward's madness and physiological changes. Willett learns that Ward had spent the past several years attempting to discover the grave of his ill-reputed ancestor, Joseph Curwen.

The doctor slowly begins to reveal the truth behind the legends surrounding Curwen, an eighteenth-century shipping entrepreneur and alleged alchemist, who was in reality a necromancer and mass murderer. A raid on Curwen's farm was remarkable for the shouted incantations, lights, explosions, and some not-quite-human figures shot down by the raiders. The raiders swore any witnesses to strict secrecy about what they saw and heard.

As Willett's investigations proceed, he finds that Charles had recovered Curwen's ashes, and through the use of magical formulae contained in documents found hidden in Curwen's home in Providence was able to call forth Curwen from his "essential saltes" and resurrect him. Willett also finds that Curwen, who resembles Charles enough to pass for him, murdered and replaced his modern descendant and resumed his evil activities. Although Curwen convinces onlookers that he is Charles, his anachronistic mindset and behavior lead authorities to certify him insane and imprison him in an asylum.

While Curwen is locked up, Willett's investigation leads him to a bungalow in Pawtuxet Village, which Ward had purchased while under the influence of Curwen. The house is on the site of the old farm which was Curwen's headquarters for his nefarious doings; beneath is a vast catacomb that the wizard had built as a lair during his previous lifetime. During a horrific journey through this labyrinth, in which Willett sees a deformed monster in a pit, he discovers the truth about Curwen's crimes and also the means of returning him to the grave. It is also revealed that Curwen has been engaged in a long-term conspiracy with certain other necromancers, associates from his previous life who have somehow escaped death, to resurrect and torture the world's wisest people to gain knowledge that will make them powerful and threaten the future of mankind.

While in Curwen's laboratory, Willett accidentally summons an ancient entity who is an enemy of Curwen and his fellow necromancers. The doctor faints, awakening much later in the bungalow. The entrance to the vaults has been sealed as if it had never existed, but Willett finds a note from the being written in Latin instructing him to kill Curwen and destroy his body. Willett confronts Curwen at the asylum and succeeds in reversing the resurrection spell, returning the sorcerer to dust. News reports reveal that Curwen's prime co-conspirators and their households have met brutal deaths, and their lairs have been destroyed.

== Characters ==
=== Charles Dexter Ward ===
Ward was born in 1902; he is 26 in 1928, at the time the story takes place. Though considered one of Lovecraft's autobiographical characters, some details of the character seem to be based on William Lippitt Mauran, who lived in the Halsey house and, like Ward, was "wheeled...in a carriage" in front of it. Like the Wards, the Maurans also owned a farmhouse in Pawtuxet, Rhode Island.

=== Joseph Curwen ===
Ward's ancestor (great-great-great-grandfather) and dead ringer, a successful merchant, shipping magnate, slave trader, and highly accomplished sorcerer, born in what is now Danvers, Massachusetts, seven miles from Salem, on February 18, 1662. He flees to Providence from the Salem witch trials in 1692. He dies, at least temporarily, in 1771 in the course of a raid on his lair by a group of important Providence citizens (Abraham Whipple, John and Moses Brown and Esek Hopkins among them) who have got wind of only a few of his crimes. He is killed again, presumably for good, by Dr. Willett using Curwen's own sorcery. Curwen perfects a method of reducing the effects of aging to an uncanny degree. He also has the ability to resurrect the dead from either the complete corpse or its "essential saltes" (derived from the ashes of the corpse), and converse with them. This ability is used to obtain privileged intelligence from long-defunct wise men. To this end his agents scour the graveyards and tombs of the world for the corpses of illustrious persons which are then smuggled back to Providence, where Curwen temporarily raises them to torture their secrets out of them. In this endeavour he is assisted by two fellow necromancers and Salem exiles: Jedediah/Simon Orne, alias Joseph Nadek, who lives in Prague, and Edward Hutchinson, who masquerades as Baron Ferenczy in Transylvania.

He is able to summon entities such as Yog-Sothoth to assist him in his magic. The ultimate goal of these men's activities, i.e. the nature or the use for the information extracted from the resurrected wise persons, is not completely specified and its interpretation is largely left to the reader. This ambiguity also affects, notably, the exact circumstances of Curwen's "first" death. It is evident he was betrayed and probably killed by the entity summoned in his defense during the siege to the hidden grounds of his farm, but the identity of this being, as well as its possible connection with Yog-Sothoth (whose name is mentioned in the incantations) is left open to speculation. It is significant, however, that the entity's irruption during the confrontation elicits "An unmistakable human shout or deep chorused scream", as well as "a yell of utter, ultimate fright and stark madness wrenched from scores of human throats—a yell which came strong and clear despite the depth from which it must have burst", and that the participants of the raid are left with psychological sequels far beyond those expected in any episode of unconventional warfare.

Prior to his first death, Curwen finds a way to create a spell that would transcend time and inspire a descendant to become interested in him and his work and attempt to bring him back should he ever be slain. When later resurrected by Ward, Curwen initially goes in disguise as a bearded, spectacled "Dr. Allen" to avoid suspicion due to his close resemblance to Ward. The undead Curwen shows vampiristic tendencies as a side effect of his resurrection, thereby attacking local travelers and breaking into houses to drink the blood of the inhabitants. Curwen immediately makes contact with Orne and Hutchinson, who have been alive and active all the while, and starts up his old plots once again. He soon murders Ward when he starts having doubts about what they are doing and assumes his identity. Curwen never hesitates to stoop to murder, torture or blackmail to achieve his ends; he also uses – and kills – vast numbers of living slaves as subjects for his experiments. He also feigns some degree of civic spirit and decency, both to his fellow citizens and to his wife, as part of a clever ruse—a social gambit aimed at producing an heir, as well as improving his public image to avoid forced displacement.

=== Marinus Bicknell Willett ===
An H. P. Lovecraft Encyclopedia compares Willett's character to other "valiant counterweight[s]" in Lovecraft such as Thomas Malone in "The Horror at Red Hook" (1925) and Henry Armitage in "The Dunwich Horror"; like Willett, Armitage "defeats the 'villains' by incantations, and he is susceptible to the same flaws—pomposity, arrogance, self-importance—that can be seen in Willett."

== Inspiration ==
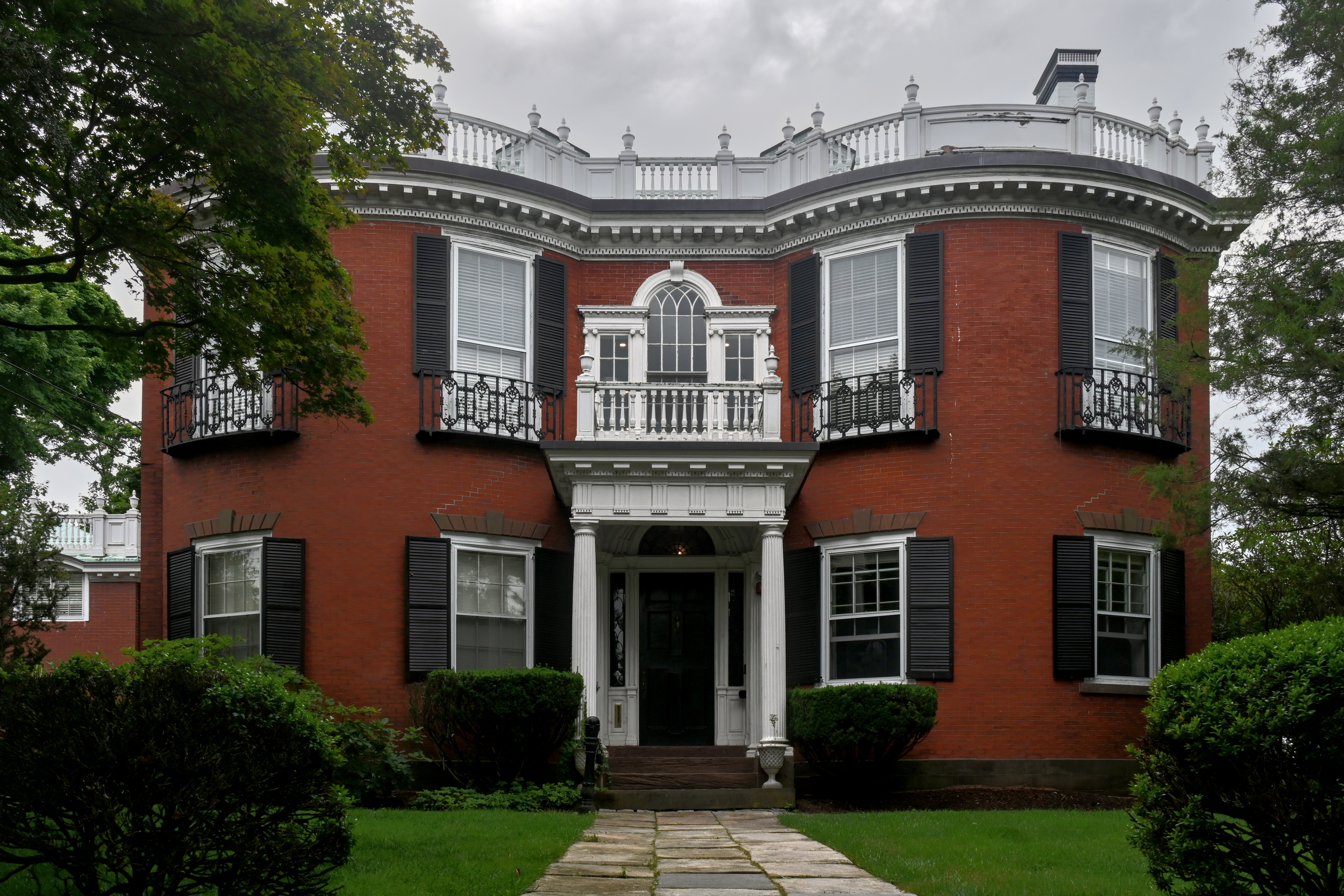
Halsey House at 140 Prospect St. served as the Ward house in the story

In August 1925, Lovecraft's Aunt Lillian sent him an anecdote about the house at 140 Prospect Street, built in 1801 by Colonel Thomas Lloyd Halsey in Providence, Rhode Island. Lovecraft wrote back, "So the Halsey house is haunted! Ugh! That's where Wild Tom Halsey kept live terrapins in the cellar—maybe it's their ghosts. Anyway, it's a magnificent old mansion, & a credit to a magnificent old town!" Lovecraft would make this house—renumbered as 100 Prospect—the basis for the Ward house. The following month, September 1925, Lovecraft read Providence in Colonial Times, by Gertrude Selwyn Kimball, a 1912 history that provided him the anecdotes about John Merritt and Dr. Checkley that he incorporated into his novel.

A possible literary model is Walter de la Mare's novel The Return (1910), which Lovecraft read in mid-1926. He describes it in his essay "Supernatural Horror in Literature" as a tale in which "We see the soul of a dead man reach out of its grave of two centuries and fasten itself on the flesh of the living."

The theme of a descendant who closely resembles a distant ancestor may come from Nathaniel Hawthorne's The House of the Seven Gables, which Lovecraft called "New England's greatest contribution to weird literature" in "Supernatural Horror in Literature".

Another proposed literary source is M. R. James' short story "Count Magnus", also praised in "Supernatural Horror in Literature", which suggests the resurrection of a sinister 17th century figure.

The germ of inspiration came from Lovecraft reading Cotton Mather and running across a quote from Borellus. Borellus is Petrus Borellus, also known as Pierre Borel, a well-known French doctor and alchemist. The quote refers to old experiments of the alchemists in creating life/rebirth from death using essential salts. The entire quote (which is actually a paraphrasing by Mather) is as follows:

The essential Saltes of Animals may be so prepared and preserved, that an ingenious Man may have the whole Ark of Noah in his own Studie, and raise the fine Shape of an Animal out of its Ashes at his Pleasure; and by the lyke Method from the essential Saltes of humane Dust, a Philosopher may, without any criminal Necromancy, call up the Shape of any dead Ancestour from the Dust whereinto his Bodie has been incinerated.

== Reception ==
Lovecraft himself was displeased with the novel, calling it a "cumbrous, creaking bit of self-conscious antiquarianism". He made little effort to publish the work, leaving it to be published posthumously in Weird Tales by August Derleth and Donald Wandrei.

Writing in The New York Times, reviewer William Poster described Ward as "a good story in the New England witchcraft tradition, well seasoned with alchemy, vampirism, ancient documents and mummy-stealing". Horror historian Les Daniels called The Case of Charles Dexter Ward Lovecraft's "finest novel". E. F. Bleiler noted that the short novel, "despite its being strangely tired and routine, has interesting concepts and good moments". Baird Searles found that "HPL's great knowledge of New England history provides a convincing background" for the story. Douglas Robillard stated Lovecraft's negative assessment of The Case of Charles Dexter Ward was "too harsh; this is one of his finest works".

== Cthulhu Mythos ==
The Case of Charles Dexter Ward contains the first mention of the Cthulhu Mythos entity Yog-Sothoth, who appears repeatedly as an element in an incantation. Joseph Curwen is the owner of a copy of the Necronomicon and there are hints of cult activities in a fishing village that refer obliquely to the events narrated in "The Festival". The story also contains references to the Dream Cycle: Dr. Willett notices the "Sign of Koth" chiselled above a doorway, and remembers his friend Randolph Carter drawing the sign and explaining its powers and meaning.

Brian Lumley expanded on the character of Baron Ferenczy, mentioned but never met in The Case of Charles Dexter Ward, in his Necroscope series, specifically Book IV: Deadspeak, where Janos Ferenczy uses the Yog-Sothoth formula to call forth whole bodies from ash remains, and to return them to that state.

When Dexter's mother hears chanting ("per adonai eloim, adonai jehova, adonai sabaoth, metraton on agla mathon, verbum pythonicum, mysterium salamandrae, conventus, antra gnomorum, daemonia coeli gad, almousin, gibor, jehosua, evam, zariatnatmik, veni, veni, veni."), the chanting is quoted (along with many other incantations in the story) from Eliphas Levi's Transcendental Magic, which translates the passage as "By Adonaï Eloïm, Adonaï Jehova, Adonai Sabaoth, Metraton On Agla Adonaï Mathon, the pythonic word, the mystery of the salamander, the assembly of sylphs, the grotto of gnomes, the demons of the heaven of Gad, Almousin, Gibor, Jehosua, Evam, Zariatnatmik, Come, Come, Come!" The incantation invokes several divine names, such as Adonai, Eloim, and Jehova, and references the Salamander, Sylphs, and Gnomes, which are the alchemical representatives of Fire, Air, and Earth respectively, as described by Paracelsus. The "mystery of the salamander" is also referenced in other short stories.

== Adaptations ==
=== Film ===
- In 1963, Roger Corman filmed a loose adaptation of the story titled The Haunted Palace starring Vincent Price and Lon Chaney Jr. The film was advertised as "Edgar Allan Poe's The Haunted Palace," but it was not based on Poe's poem of the same title.
- In 1992, Dan O'Bannon filmed a more faithful adaptation, The Resurrected, starring John Terry and Chris Sarandon.

=== Games ===
- In 2001, DreamCatcher Interactive published a video game titled Necronomicon: The Dawning of Darkness developed by Wanadoo Edition. All the characters' names from the book were changed, as was the ending.
- Specialbit Studio produced a hidden object game titled Haunted Hotel: Charles Dexter Ward. It follows the broad strokes of the story, with the player controlling Charles Ward's sister, who attempts to investigate his pending transformation into Joseph Curwen.

=== Stage ===
- In 1980 Ken Campbell's Science Fiction Theatre of Liverpool staged an opera based on the novel, with music by Camilla Saunders.

=== Audio and music ===
- In 2013, The H. P. Lovecraft Historical Society produced a Dark Adventure Radio Theatre radio drama interpretation.
- In 2017, the Mechanisms released The Bifrost Incident, a concept album mixing elements of Lovecraft's work with Norse mythology. Yog-Sothoth appears at the climax, after the full incantation from The Case of Charles Dexter Ward is recited.
- In December 2018, BBC Radio broadcast an adaptation of the story as the first series in The Lovecraft Investigations, a modern-day true crime podcast set in Britain and the US. It was released in 10 episodes, and later aired on BBC Radio 4 as regular radio-broadcast episodes. The story was adapted and directed by Julian Simpson, and the cast included Samuel Barnett as Ward, with Barnaby Kay and Jana Carpenter as true crime podcasters investigating his story. The supporting cast included Alun Armstrong, Adam Godley, Nicola Walker, Steven Mackintosh, Mark Bazeley, Richard Cordery, Harry Kay, Penny Downie, Madeleine Potter, Phoebe Fox, Ben Crowe, Nathan Osgood, Susan Jameson, Samantha Dakin, Alex Lanipekun and Cherrelle Skeete. In 2019, a sequel was made adapting The Whisperer in Darkness followed in 2020 by an adaption of The Shadow over Innsmouth.

=== Comics ===
The novel was adapted by artist I.N.J. Culbard in 2012, in a comic book published by Self Made Hero under the novel's title, featuring a foreword by comic book creator Jeff Lemire. The art in this rendition was described by one critic as "a brilliant job of communicating [a] vision of a rotting afterlife to... readers."
