= Jana Carpenter =

American actress and singer (born 1971)

- Born: January 26, 1971 (age 55); Andrews Air Force Base, Maryland, U.S.
- Occupations: Actress, singer, musician
- Instruments: Vocals, guitar
- Years active: 1991–present
- Member of: Sweet Billy Pilgrim, Piefinger
- Spouse: Julian Simpson (m. 2005)

Jana Carpenter (born January 26, 1971) is an American actress, singer and guitarist based in the UK. She has appeared in TV and radio series, episodes and films and is also a vocalist and guitarist in the countryfolk or harmony band Piefinger, and the Mercury Prize-nominated experimental rock band Sweet Billy Pilgrim.

== Early life ==
Carpenter was born on Andrews Air Force Base, Maryland, on January 26, 1971.

== Career ==
Carpenter provided the English voice of Norie in the English dub of Roujin Z. She played roles in films such as The Criminal, Demon Wheels, and Private Life.

In the first series of the revived British programme Doctor Who, Carpenter played the role of De Maggio, a soldier who protects the Metaltron Cage with Bywater (John Schwab), in the episode of the first series "Dalek".

== Personal life ==
Carpenter has been married to writer and director Julian Simpson since 2005.

== Filmography ==
=== Film ===
Year	Title	Role	Notes
1994	Roujin Z	Norie (voice)	English version
1999	The Criminal	Grace	
2004	Demon Wheels	Tourist	Short
2006	Private Life	Maggie	Short
2019	Tales from the Lodge	Till Girl	

=== Television ===
Year	Title	Role	Notes
1989	Megazone 23 III	Lisa (voice)	TV series
1994	The Bill	Nikki Knight	Episode: "No Way to Treat a Lady"
2003	Manchild	Katie Landers	Episode: "2.6"
2003	Silent Witness	Alice Delaney	Episode: "Running on Empty: Part 1"
2004	Murder Prevention	Katie	Episode: "Last Man Out: Part 2"
2004	Agatha Christie's Marple	May Ainsworth	Episode: "The Murder at the Vicarage"
2005	Doctor Who	De Maggio	Episode: "Dalek"
2007	Superstorm	Holly Zabrieski	TV miniseries
2008, 2013	Holby City	Vicky Slogan / Sheridan Talbot	Episodes: "Cutting the Cord", "Unravelled"
2012	New Tricks	Ruth Bisley	Episode: "Part of a Whole"
2014	Trying Again	Jo	Episode: "1.7"

== Radio ==
- 2011 Bad Memories. Imogen Blake. BBC Radio 4
- 2017 Mythos, Glamis. Libby Ward. BBC Radio 4.
- The Lovecraft Investigations. Kennedy Fisher. BBC Radio 4.

- 2018 The Case of Charles Dexter Ward
- 2019 The Whisperer in Darkness
- 2020 The Shadow Over Innsmouth
- 2023 The Haunter of the Dark

- 2022 Who Is Aldrich Kemp? Kennedy Fisher and the Underwood sisters. BBC Radio 4.
- 2023 Who Killed Aldrich Kemp? Forsaken McTeague and the Underwood sisters. BBC Radio 4.
