= Barnaby Kay =

British actor

- Born: Barnaby Kay; 9 April 1969 (age 57); St Pancras, London, England
- Occupation: Actor
- Years active: 1993–present
- Spouse: Nicola Walker (m. 2006)
- Children: 1
- Father: Richard Kay

Barnaby Kay (born 9 April 1969) is a British actor who has played roles in television, stage, film and performance art. He was a member of the Royal Shakespeare Company.

== Personal life ==
Kay was born at St Pancras, London and is the son of actor Richard Kay (1937–1987) and Jaqueline (née Maxwell) and the grandson of entertainer Arthur Kay (died 1970).

He met actress Nicola Walker when they worked together with the Out of Joint Theatre Company, in a 1994 touring production of The Man of Mode and The Libertine; they married in 2006, and have a son together.

== Career ==
Among other roles, Kay has appeared in The Five (2016), Wallander (2012–15), Doctor Who (2015), New Tricks (2013–14), Frankie (2013), Public Enemies (2011), Wuthering Heights (2009), Holby City (2008), Midsomer Murders (2005), Spooks (2004), Prime Suspect (2003), Serious and Organised (2003), Silent Witness (2002), Conspiracy (2001), The Bill (2000), Casualty (1999), Shakespeare in Love (1998), Croupier (1998), Jonathan Creek (1997), Cracker (1996), The Vet (1995) and Minder (1994).

=== Theatre ===
Kay's theatre work includes A Streetcar Named Desire at the Donmar Warehouse (2009), Orlando in As You Like It at the Novello Theatre (2006), Closer at the National Theatre (1999–2000), Pierre Bezukhov in Warring Peas at the Hampstead Theatre (2008), Tinky Winky, Teletubbies tour (2011-2016), Steve Calhanm in Eric Larue at the Soho Theatre (2006), and Alexander Petrovich Kalabushkin in Dying For It at the Almeida Theatre (2007).

=== Radio ===
- The Lovecraft Investigations

- 2018 The Case of Charles Dexter Ward. BBC Radio 4.
- 2019 The Whisperer in Darkness. BBC Radio 4.
- 2020 The Shadow Over Innsmouth. BBC Radio 4.
- 2023 The Haunter of the Dark. BBC Radio 4.

== Filmography ==
=== Film ===
Year	Title	Role	Notes	Ref.
1997	The Man Who Knew Too Little	SWAT Team Leader		
1997	Oscar and Lucinda	Wardley-Fish		
1998	Croupier	Car Dealer		
1998	Shakespeare in Love	Nol		
2000	Eisenstein	Andrei		
2008	Arn: The Kingdom at Road's End	A knight		
2010	Arn: The Knight Templar	A knight		
2012	Red Tails	Commanding General Westlake		
2012	The Deadfall	The Previous Occupier	Short film	
2013	Fire Horse	Roddy	Short film	
2023	Mission: Impossible – Dead Reckoning Part One	Put-Pocket Passenger		

=== Television ===
Year	Title	Role	Notes	Ref.
1994	Minder	Riley	Episode: "The Long Good Thursday"	
1995	The Vet	Tom Sims	Episode: "Relative Values"	
1995	The Ghostbusters of East Finchley	DC Asho	Episode: "Episode 6"	
1996	Cracker	Dennis Philby	Episode: "White Ghost"	
1997	Jonathan Creek	D.C. Spelling	Episode: "The House of Monkeys"	
1999	Casualty	Gareth Mullins	Episode: "Mother's Day"	
1999	The Blonde Bombshell	Alan Lake	Miniseries; 1 episode	
2000	The Bill	Howard Fallon	Recurring role; 6 episodes	
2001	Life As We Know It	Harry Cameron	Recurring role; 3 episodes	
2001	Conspiracy	Rudolf Lange	TV movie	
2002	AKA Albert Walker	Mike Darke	TV movie	
2002	Silent Witness	DS Clive Johnson	Episode: "The Fall Out"	
2003	Serious & Organised	Oliver Wolcott	Episode: "Unfaithful"	
2003	Prime Suspect	DC Michael Philips	Episode: "The Last Witness"	
2004	Spooks	John Fortescue	Episode: "Love and Death"	
2005	Midsomer Murders	Dr. Osgood	Episode: "Bantling Boy"	
2005	The Government Inspector	Tom Kelly	TV movie	
2007	Life Line	Tony	TV movie	
2008	Holby City	Aaron Fellows	Recurring role; 4 episodes	
2008	The Fixer	Danny Spader	Episode: "Episode 4"	
2009	Wuthering Heights	Saul	Miniseries; 2 episodes	
2010	Dispatches	Narrator	Recurring role; 2 episodes	
2011	Without You	Joe Lipton	Miniseries; 3 episodes	
2012	Treasure Island	Tom Morgan	Miniseries; 2 episodes	
2012	Public Enemies	Will	Miniseries; 3 episodes	
2012	Dead Boss	Justin	Miniseries; 4 episodes	
2012	Midsomer Murders	Adrian Sharp	Episode: "Written in the Stars"	
2012	Holby City	Eamonn Gleeson	Episode: "Hail Caesar"	
2012–2015	Wallander	Lennart Mattson	Recurring role; 5 episodes	
2013	Frankie	Toby Ellis	Episode: "Episode 4"	
2013–2014	New Tricks	DAC Ned Hancock	Recurring role; 4 episodes	
2014	One Child	Mr. Anderson	Miniseries; 2 episodes	
2015	Doctor Who	Heidi	Episode: "The Girl Who Died"	
2016	The Five	DI Liam Townsend	Miniseries; 5 episodes	
2022	Anatomy of a Scandal	Detective Sergeant Willis	Episode: "Episode 1"	
2023	Screw	Governor Mayhew	Series regular; 6 episodes	
