= Public Enemies (TV series) =

- Genre: Crime drama
- Written by: Tony Marchant
- Directed by: Dearbhla Walsh
- Starring: Anna Friel; Daniel Mays; Lorraine Ashbourne; Peter Wight; Barbara Marten; Georgina Rich; Terence Maynard; Joel Fry; Barnaby Kay; Nicholas Gleaves; Joe Armstrong; Aisling Loftus
- Country of origin: United Kingdom
- Original language: English
- No. of series: 1
- No. of episodes: 3

Production
- Executive producer: Will Gould
- Producer: Julia Stannard
- Production location: United Kingdom
- Running time: 60 minutes
- Production company: Tiger Aspect Productions

Original release
- Network: BBC One
- Release: 4 January – 6 January 2012

Public Enemies is a three-part British television drama series, written by playwright Tony Marchant, that is based upon the professional and private lives of Paula Radnor, a probation officer working within the British Probation Service, who is working with convicted murderer Eddie Mottram, who has served 10 years in prison for the murder of his 17-year-old girlfriend, and is struggling to adapt to life outside of prison. First broadcast on BBC One from 4 to 6 January 2012, the series stars Anna Friel as Radnor and Daniel Mays as Mottram, and encompasses a cast including Georgina Rich, Aisling Loftus, Peter Wight, Barbara Marten, Nicholas Gleaves, Joe Armstrong and Barnaby Kay. The series was directed by Dearbhla Walsh, with Will Gould acting as executive producer.

The complete series was released on DVD on 30 April 2012.

== Critical reception ==
Patrick Smith of The Telegraph said of the first episode, "A hard-hitting, gloom-ridden drama about the inadequacies of the British probation service, this three-part serial – showing over consecutive nights – was created by the brilliant Tony Marchant, a British writer who’s no stranger to tackling unhappy, unsettling subjects. ... Just as the episode grew more tense, so too did Eddie Mottram (Daniel Mays). Readjusting to the outside world was proving difficult, and his old friends weren’t helping matters – as one of them pointed out to him: “I haven’t seen you in 10 years, mate. It ain’t just mobile phones that have moved on.” Sometimes the story felt contrived – you just knew that Mottram would proclaim his innocence – but, ultimately, the strength of the script and the credibility of the acting carried it through.”

== Cast ==
- Anna Friel — Paula Radnor
- Daniel Mays — Eddie Mottram
- Lorraine Ashbourne — Marion Sharmer
- Peter Wight — Ken Whiteley
- Barbara Marten — Kathy Whiteley
- Georgina Rich — Kelly
- Terence Maynard — Colin Bolt
- Joel Fry — Darren Nunn
- Barnaby Kay — Will
- Nicholas Gleaves — Trevor Brotherton
- Joe Armstrong — Ben Somers
- Romy Irving — Abbey
- Abbie Fox — Jessie
- Glen Davies — Philip Pointer
- Aisling Loftus — Jade
- Nick Blood — Glen Smithfield
- Roy Smiles — Eddie Stiles
- Ian Burfield — DCI Andy Parkham

== Episodes ==
No.	Title	Directed by	Written by	Original release date	Viewers (millions)
1	"Episode 1"	Tony Marchant	Dearbhla Walsh	4 January 2012	N/A
Probation officer Paula Radnor is pilloried and suspended when convicted murderer Philip Pointer, on parole to her, kills again. On return to work, her senior, Marion Sharmer allocates her another lifer, Eddie Mottram, who has served ten years for strangling his girlfriend Georgia when he was seventeen. He is determined to do everything right, but finds it hard to adjust to freedom, his married friends not wanting to know him and his sister Kelly being his only family support. He starts work at a garden centre and dates co-worker Jade, but keeps his past a secret from her. Given her past experience, Paula is harsh on him, but feels she is becoming an agent of control, not a helper and agrees not to report him when he accidentally runs into his victim's father whilst visiting the murder site. After rowing with the manager of the hostel where he lives, Eddie runs off and turns up at Paula's house, declaring that he is innocent of Georgia's death.
2	"Episode 2"	Tony Marchant	Dearbhla Walsh	5 January 2012	4.93
Whilst Kelly unsuccessfully tries to launch an appeal against her brother's sentence, Eddie tells Jade he served time for robbery — but Paula, pressurised by Marion, tells Jade the truth about him. Consequently, Jade dumps him and he loses his job, causing him to go berserk at a hostel meeting. The hostel manager wants him recalled, but Paula refuses, feeling she is to blame. As she begins to doubt his guilt, Eddie learns that Georgia two-timed him with a friend, Ben Somers, now a popular G.P. Eddie attacks Ben, who nonetheless refuses to press charges. As he is released, Paula, having visited recalled prisoner Philip Pointer and learnt about slyness, comes to believe that Eddie is indeed innocent and tells him so.
3	"Episode 3"	Tony Marchant	Dearbhla Walsh	6 January 2012	N/A
Now convinced of Eddie's innocence, Paula helps him and Kelly phrase their petition and gets actively involved when solicitor Dawn Clough agrees to take on the appeal. They discover certain, vital facts in the case notes not mentioned at the trial, including the presence of another car near the murder site. Marion and Paula's boyfriend Will think she is getting too involved and Will attacks Eddie. The appeal is dismissed, and a local rag snaps Eddie giving Paula a kiss of gratitude, leading to his recall. Is this the end of the line or will the true killer succumb to conscience and come forward to admit guilt?
