= Pierre Borel =

French chemist, alchemist, physician, and botanist (1620–1671)

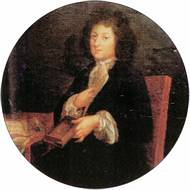
- Portrait of Pierre Borel by Jacques Pauthe
- Born: c. 1620; Castres
- Died: 1671 (aged 50–51); Paris, France
- Occupations: Chemist; alchemist; physician; botanist

Pierre Borel (Latin: Petrus Borellius; c. 1620 – 1671) was a French chemist, alchemist, physician, and botanist.

== Biography ==
Borel was born in Castres c. 1620. He became a doctor of medicine at the University of Montpellier in 1640. In 1654, he became physician to the King of France, Louis XIV.

In 1663, he married Esther de Bonnafous. In 1674, he became a member of the Académie française. He died in Paris in 1671.

He concerned himself with an eclectic range of subjects such as optics, ancient history, philology, and bibliography.

Borel appears (under the name "Borellus") in the novella The Case of Charles Dexter Ward by H. P. Lovecraft, where he is represented as a necromancer. Early in the novella there appears the following "quotation" from his work:

The essential Saltes of Animals may be so prepared and preserved, that an ingenious Man may have the whole Ark of Noah in his own Studie, and raise the fine Shape of an Animal out of its Ashes at his Pleasure, and by the lyke Method from the essential Saltes of humane Dust, a Philosopher may, without any criminal Necromancy, call up the Shape of any dead Ancestour from the Dust whereinto his Bodie has been incinerated”.

The Case of Charles Dexter Ward (first published by Weird Tales in 1941).

The above passage is only partially genuine, the source being not Borel himself, but a paraphrase of his ideas concerning the Alchemical practice of palingenesis (from salts refined from the ashes of living things) presented by Cotton Mather in his Magnalia Christi Americana of 1702.

== Works ==
- Les antiquités de Castres, 1649
- Bibliotheca chimica, 1654
- Trésor de recherches et d'antiquités gauloises et françaises, 1655
- Historiarium et observationum medico-physicarum centuria IV, 1653, 1656
- De vero telescopii inventore, 1655.
- Vitae Renati Cartesii, summi philosophi compendium, 1656.
- Discours nouveau prouvant la pluralité des mondes, 1657.
