= Richard Kay (actor) =

English actor (1937–1987)

- Born: Richard Arthur Kay; 16 March 1937; Newcastle-upon-Tyne
- Died: 2 July 1987 (aged 50)
- Education: Leighton Park School
- Alma mater: Emmanuel College, Cambridge
- Occupation: actor
- Years active: 1970s–1980s
- Relatives: Barnaby Kay (son); Nicola Walker (daughter-in-law)

Richard Arthur Kay (16 March 1937 – 2 July 1987) was a British actor. Originally from Newcastle-upon-Tyne, he was educated at Leighton Park School followed by Emmanuel College, Cambridge, and is best known for his work in Déjà Vu (1985), Three Sisters (1970) and Wuthering Heights (1978). In television, he appeared in Coronation Street, Lady Killers and Juliet Bravo amongst other programmes.

Kay was the son of the entertainer Arthur Kay (died 1970). He married Jacqueline Venetia Maxwell in 1964. The marriage produced three children. Their son is the actor Barnaby Kay, and their daughter-in-law is fellow actor Nicola Walker.

Kay died aged 50, on 2 July 1987.
