= The Lovecraft Investigations =

Weird horror podcast series

- Official card for season 3, The Shadow over Innsmouth
- Genre: Horror podcast
- Language: British English

Creative team
- Created by: Julian Simpson
- Written by: Julian Simpson
- Directed by: Julian Simpson

Cast and voices
- Voices: Barnaby Kay; Jana Carpenter; Nicola Walker

Production
- Production: Sweet Talk Productions; BBC Radio 4; Sweet Talk Pure Hokum

Publication
- No. of seasons: 5
- No. of episodes: 42
- Original release: 2 January 2019 – 30 March 2026
- Provider: BBC Radio 4 (series 1-4); pleasantgreen.co.uk (Crowley)

Reception
- Cited for: Best Fiction (silver); British Podcast Awards

Related
- Website: www.bbc.co.uk/programmes/p06spb8w

The Lovecraft Investigations is a mystery thriller/horror fiction podcast created, written and directed by Julian Simpson, based on several works of H. P. Lovecraft and his Cthulhu Mythos. Produced by Karen Rose and Sweet Talk Productions for BBC Radio 4, the podcast premiered on 2 January 2019, with further series published in November 2019, November 2020 and October 2023.

The story is a modernization of the original Lovecraft works, set around the same time the podcast aired and presented as a podcast-within-a-podcast in which the two hosts of the Mystery Machine, a true crime podcast investigating cases related to the occult and conspiracy theories, stumble upon a case hiding a much larger mystery. It stars Barnaby Kay and Simpson's spouse Jana Carpenter as the two podcasters, Matt Heawood and Kennedy Fisher, with Nicola Walker as Eleanor Peck, a specialist in myths and the occult who helps their investigations.

Each season of The Lovecraft Investigations is titled after, and mostly based on, one of Lovecraft's works, namely 1927's The Case of Charles Dexter Ward, 1930's The Whisperer in Darkness, 1931's The Shadow over Innsmouth, and 1936's The Haunter of the Dark while creating an overarching story; it is also set within Simpson's Pleasant Green Universe of audio dramas, with the character of Fisher notably appearing in Simpson's Who is Aldrich Kemp? between the third and fourth seasons of The Lovecraft Investigations.

== Synopsis ==
The first season, The Case of Charles Dexter Ward, follows Heawood and Fisher as they investigate the unexplained disappearance of Charles Dexter Ward, a young patient in a mental health facility in Rhode Island who vanished one day from a closed room, never to be seen again.

In The Whisperer in Darkness, the duo investigates Henry Akeley, an elderly man from Suffolk and former acquaintance of Eleanor Peck, a woman who helped them in the case of Charles Dexter Ward. Although Akeley contacted Peck claiming to have important things to share, upon arriving to his house, he is nowhere to be seen, and the clues and recordings he left behind are puzzling.

The third season, The Shadow over Innsmouth, the two investigate the family of Fisher, after their previous investigations lead them to believe the family might be connected to the conspiracies uncovered in the podcast. To do so, Heawood goes to Iraq, while Fisher goes to Innsmouth, New England.

The fourth season follows Fisher who, having searched for Heawood for three years, gets a chance to further explore the mysteries around Pleasant Green and Heawood's disappearance in The Haunter of the Dark, a mystery tying back to Simpson's 2011 radio drama Bad Memories.

== Production details ==
The series was written by Julian Simpson and is connected to his Pleasant Green Universe audio drama setting. In particular, a version of The department, a shadowy government agency monitoring supernatural threats, appears in both the Mythos trilogy of audio dramas and The Lovecraft Investigations; a bonus episode for the final episode of the series also directly mentions Marie Lairre, a character from Mythos. Karen Rose produced all three of the initial series, with sound design by David Thomas and music by Tim Elsenburg. The "Mystery Machine" characters continue in BBC Radio 4's 2022 Limelight series Who Is Aldrich Kemp?, which continues the Pleasant Green storylines without a Lovecraft connection.

In developing the dramas, Simpson sought to modernize Lovecraft's stories while also tying in different folklore and actual unsolved mysteries.

== Voice cast ==
=== Main ===
- Jana Carpenter as Kennedy Fisher, Heawood's long-time Mystery Machine co-host who specializes in on-site investigating
  - Carpenter also portrays Daisy Marsh, a woman who looks identical to Fisher, in season 3.
- Barnaby Kay as Matthew "Matt" Heawood, the co-host of the Mystery Machine who specializes in research and post-production
- Nicola Walker as Dr. Eleanor Peck (recurring season 1–2; main season 3–4), a university lecturer who specializes in myths and the occult, and becomes a regular advisor for the podcast. It is implied that she is in fact Marie Lairre, a character portrayed by Walker in Simpson's previous series Mythos, having forgotten her past to go undercover as Peck; she seemingly regains her memories in the season 4 finale.

=== Recurring ===
- Samuel Barnett as Charles Dexter Ward (seasons 1, 3), a patient in a psychiatric facility whose inexplicable disappearance is investigated by Heawood and Fisher
- Mark Bazeley as:
  - Dr. Jonathan Willett (seasons 1–3), Ward's former psychiatrist who was later placed in a psychiatric institution after brutally murdering a seemingly random woman
  - Albert Wilmarth (seasons 2–3), a vicar and friend of Akeley named after Albert N. Wilmarth, the narrator of Lovecraft's The Whisperer in Darkness. In season 3, he is revealed to be "John Silence", a man working for the Department of Works, a mysterious organization with ties to the supernatural.
- David Calder as Henry Akeley (season 2), a former student of Peck who goes missing, leading Fisher and Heawood to go look for him and look into his life
- Karla Crome as Melody Cartwright (season 3), a young woman who becomes the target of an elusive group in season 1, and later meets Heawood
- Samantha Dakin (season 1) and Jennifer Armour (season 3) as Alice, a young county clerk from Providence whom Fisher meets in the first season, and again in season 3, having become a fan of the show
- Phoebe Fox as:
  - Lucy Hawthorne (season 1)
  - "Parker" (seasons 2–3), a member of the Department of Works. The character returns from Simpson's previous series Mythos, in which she was already voiced by Fox.
- Adam Godley as George Shepley / "Dr. Allan" (season 1), a librarian who becomes close to Fisher and helps her in her investigation
- Rebekah Staton as April Marston (season 2)
- Walles Hamonde as Zadok Allen (season 3), a historian Fisher meets in Innsmouth, and who appears identical to George Shepley
- Kate Isitt as Caroline Morse (season 4), the estranged sister of Wilberforce Ashton-Heath
- Susan Jameson as Amelia Fenner (season 1), a British practising witch involved with a number of covens in the mid to late 20th century.
- Ferdinand Kingsley as "Slide" (seasons 2–4), a hacker and friend of Fisher who sometimes assists in her investigations
- Steven Mackintosh as Jasper (season 3), an old friend of Heawood who works for the government
- Kyle Soller as Casey (season 3), a man who runs a hotel in Innsmouth
- Rufus Wright as Wilberforce Ashton-Heath (season 4), an alt-right Member of Parliament who is pro-Brexit and anti-immigration.
- Ben Crowe as Marcus Byron (season 4), a former member of the Department of Works.
- Catherine Kanter as Victoria Ness (season 4), a former member of the Department of Works and Byron's wife.
- Tim McInnerny as Aleister Crowley (Crowley)
- Colin Tierney as Paul Garside (Crowley), an expert on Aleister Crowley

== Series ==
The trailer for The Case of Charles Dexter Ward was released in November 2018 with the full series being released in January 2019. In November 2019, a teaser was released for The Whisperer in Darkness followed the rest of the series in December. The following November, The Shadow Over Innsmouth was released along with three bonus episodes. In October 2023, the series returned with The Haunter in the Dark.

A standalone crowdfunded series Crowley, a documentary about Aleister Crowley, was released at the end of March 2026. An official crowdfunded fifth series, The Call of Cthulhu, is planned for release in early 2027.

Title	Episodes	Bonus Eps.	Original airing	Production company
The Case of Charles Dexter Ward	10	—	January 2019	Sweet Talk Productions for BBC Radio 4
The Whisperer in Darkness	9	2	November 2019	Sweet Talk Productions for BBC Radio 4
The Shadow Over Innsmouth	8	3	November 2020	Sweet Talk Productions for BBC Radio 4
The Haunter of the Dark	10	—	October 2023	Sweet Talk Productions for BBC Radio 4
Crowley	5	—	March 2026	Sweet Talk Pure Hokum

== Reception ==
Critical reception for The Lovecraft Investigations has been positive. The Verge called the first series "like Serial mixed with True Detective", and it received praise from The Spectator for its use of audio effects.

In 2019, The Case of Charles Dexter Ward won silver honours for Best Fiction Podcast at the British Podcast Awards. In 2020, the Lovecraft Investigations trilogy was among the top-ten most-listened-to podcasts/broadcasts on BBC Sounds.
