= Kyle Soller =

American actor (born 1983)

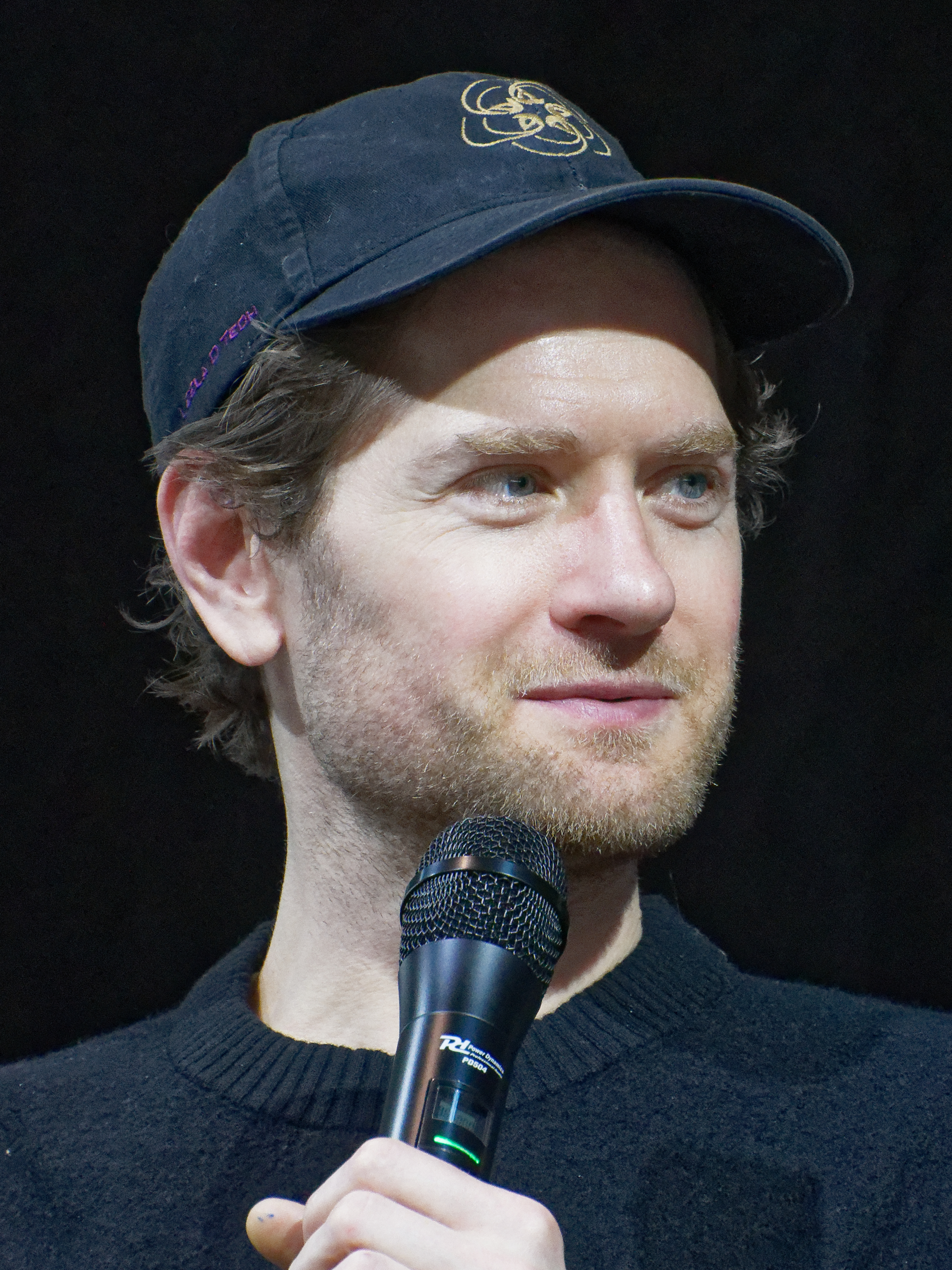
- Kyle Soller in 2025
- Born: Kyle William Soller; July 1, 1983 (age 43); Bridgeport, Connecticut, U.S.
- Education: College of William and Mary; Royal Academy of Dramatic Art (BA)
- Occupation: Actor
- Years active: 2008–present
- Spouse: Phoebe Fox (m. 2010)

Kyle William Soller (born July 1, 1983) is a UK-based American film, stage, and television actor. His accolades include three Evening Standard Theatre Awards as well as the 2019 Laurence Olivier Award for Best Actor for his performance in The Inheritance, staged at the Young Vic Theatre in 2018.

Soller has appeared in films such as Anna Karenina (2012) and Marrowbone (2017), and on television in Poldark (2015–2016), Andor (2022–2025), and Bodies (2023).

== Early life and education ==
Soller was born on July 1, 1983, in Bridgeport, Connecticut, and raised in Alexandria, Virginia. He attended Mount Vernon High School before going on to study art history the College of William & Mary in Williamsburg, Virginia. During his third year of studies, he spent a semester abroad studying at the Royal Academy of Dramatic Art (RADA) in London, and was offered admission into the academy. Soller left the College of William & Mary and relocated to London to complete his studies at the Royal Academy of Dramatic Art, graduating in 2008 with a BA in Acting Degree (H Level).

== Career ==
=== Theatre ===
Soller's breakthrough year came in 2011 where he starred in The Glass Menagerie at the Young Vic, The Government Inspector also at the Young Vic and in The Faith Machine at the Royal Court Theatre. Based on these performances he won the Evening Standard Theatre Award for Outstanding Newcomer.

In 2012, Soller starred in the West End hit Long Day's Journey into Night by Eugene O'Neill with David Suchet, Laurie Metcalf and Trevor White at the Apollo Theatre, and in the Roundabout Theatre Company's production of Cyrano de Bergerac as Christian at the American Airlines Theatre in New York. In 2019, he won the Laurence Olivier Award for Best Actor for his performance in The Inheritance, staged at The Young Vic.

=== Television and film ===
Soller appeared in BBC Three's comedy Bad Education as the new teacher Mr Schwimer. Between 2015 and 2016, he appeared in BBC One's Poldark, playing Ross Poldark's cousin, Francis and in The Hollow Crown, in the role of Clifford. He starred as an expert on apocalypses, Scotty, in Sky 1's comedy drama You, Me and the Apocalypse. In 2015, he appeared as Gerald Croft in Helen Edmundson's award-winning BBC adaptation of An Inspector Calls.

In 2022 and 2025, he appeared in the Disney+ show Andor. In 2023, he played a main role as 19th century Detective Inspector Hillinghead in Bodies.

== Personal life ==
Soller is married to actress Phoebe Fox, whom he met at RADA. They live in London.

== Acting credits ==
=== Film ===
| Year | Title | Role | Notes | Ref. |
|---|---|---|---|---|
| 2012 | Anna Karenina | Korsunsky | | |
| 2013 | The Fifth Estate | Young Staffer | | |
| 2014 | The Keeping Room | Henry | | |
| 2014 | Monsters: Dark Continent | Karl Inkelaar | | |
| 2014 | Fury | Medic No. 1 | | |
| 2017 | Marrowbone | Porter | | |
| 2017 | The Trip to Spain | Jonathan | | |
| 2018 | The Titan | Dr. Elliot Blake | | |
| 2025 | Jay Kelly | Director | | |
| TBA | Control † | TBA | Post-production | |
| TBA | Luther 3 † | TBA | Filming | |

=== Television ===
| Year | Title | Role | Notes | Ref. |
|---|---|---|---|---|
| 2013 | Bad Education | Kevin Schwimmer | Series 2, Episode 2 | |
| 2015 | An Inspector Calls | Gerald Croft | Television film | |
| 2015–2016 | Poldark | Francis Poldark | 14 episodes | |
| 2016 | The Hollow Crown: The Wars of the Roses | Clifford | Episode: "Henry VI: Part II" | |
| 2016 | You, Me and the Apocalypse | Scotty McNeil | Miniseries | |
| 2016 | Silent Witness | Marcus Chadwell | Episode: "Life Licence" | |
| 2016 | Counterfeit Cat | The Kid | Voice | |
| 2017 | Bounty Hunters | Misha | Episode 1.3 | |
| 2019 | Brexit: The Uncivil War | Zack Massingham | Television film | |
| 2019–2020 | 101 Dalmatian Street | Dante | Voice; 4 episodes | |
| 2022–2025 | Andor | Syril Karn | Main role; 17 episodes | |
| 2023 | Bodies | Alfred Hillinghead | Main role | |
| 2025 | Death by Lightning | Robert Todd Lincoln | Supporting role | |
| 2026 | Slow Horses | Jim | Series 6, 5 episodes | |

=== Theatre ===
| Year | Title | Character | Venue | Ref. |
|---|---|---|---|---|
| 2008 | The Beautiful People by William Saroyan | Owen Webster | Finborough Theatre; London, England | |
| 2009 | A Midsummer Night's Dream by William Shakespeare | Demetrius / Francis Flute / Mustardseed | Shakespeare's Globe; London, England | |
| 2010 | The Talented Mr. Ripley by Patricia Highsmith adaptation by Phyllis Nagy | Tom Ripley | Royal & Derngate; Northampton, England | |
| 2010 | The Glass Menagerie by Tennessee Williams | Jim | Young Vic; London, England | |
| 2011 | The Faith Machine by Alexi Kaye Campbell | Tom | Royal Court Theatre; London, England | |
| 2011 | The Government Inspector by Nikolai Gogol version by David Harrower | Khlestakov | Young Vic; London, England | |
| 2012 | Cyrano de Bergerac by Edmond Rostand | Christian | American Airlines Theatre; New York City, NY, U.S. | |
| 2012 | Long Day's Journey into Night by Eugene O'Neill | Edmund | Apollo Theatre; London, England | |
| 2013 | Edward II by Christopher Marlowe | Gaveston / Lightborne | National Theatre; London, England | |
| 2016 | Hedda Gabler by Henrik Ibsen | George Tesman | National Theatre; London, England | |
| 2018 | The Inheritance by Matthew Lopez | Eric Glass | Young Vic & Noël Coward Theatre; London, England | |
| 2019 | The Inheritance by Matthew Lopez | Eric Glass | Ethel Barrymore Theatre; New York City, NY, U.S. | |
| 2025 | Romans by Alice Birch | Jack Roman | Almeida Theatre; London, England | |

=== Radio ===
| Year | Title | Role | Notes | Ref. |
|---|---|---|---|---|
| 2020 | The Lovecraft Investigations | Casey | The Shadow over Innsmouth, 5 episodes | |
| 2022-2024 | Aldrich Kemp | Sebastian Harcourt | 16 episodes | |

== Awards and nominations ==
=== Theatre ===
| Year | Award | Category | Work | Result |
|---|---|---|---|---|
| 2011 | Evening Standard Theatre Award | Outstanding Newcomer | The Faith Machine, The Glass Menagerie and The Government Inspector | Won |
| 2012 | WhatsOnStage Award | Newcomer of the Year | The Faith Machine, The Glass Menagerie and The Government Inspector | Nominated |
| 2013 | Laurence Olivier Award | Best Actor in a Supporting Role | Long Day's Journey into Night | Nominated |
| 2013 | WhatsOnStage Award | Best Supporting Actor in a Play | Long Day's Journey into Night | Nominated |
| 2014 | WhatsOnStage Award | Best Supporting Actor in a Play | Edward II | Nominated |
| 2018 | Evening Standard Theatre Award | Best Actor | The Inheritance | Nominated |
| 2018 | Critics' Circle Theatre Award | Best Actor | The Inheritance | Won |
| 2019 | Laurence Olivier Award | Best Actor | The Inheritance | Won |
| 2019 | WhatsOnStage Award | Best Actor in a Play | The Inheritance | Nominated |
| 2020 | Drama Desk Award | Outstanding Actor in a Play | The Inheritance | Nominated |
| 2022 | Peabody Award | Entertainment | Andor | Won |
