= The Criminal (1999 film) =

1999 film directed by Julian Simpson

The Criminal is a 1999 British thriller film written and directed by Julian Simpson and starring Steven Mackintosh, Eddie Izzard and Natasha Little. After meeting a beautiful woman in a bar, a man's life is plunged into chaos.

== Cast ==
- Steven Mackintosh - Jasper Rawlins
- Eddie Izzard - Peter Hume
- Natasha Little - Sarah Maitland
- Yvan Attal - Mason
- Holly Aird - Detective Sergeant Rebecca White
- Bernard Hill ... Detective Inspector Walker
- Andrew Tiernan - Harris
- Jana Carpenter - Grace
- Justin Shevlin - The Barker
- Barry Stearn - Noble
- Norman Lovett - Clive
- Timothy Bateson - Thomas
- Abigail Blackmore - Barmaid
- Matthew Blackmore - Guy
- Ingrid Bradley - Scantily dressed woman
- Daniel Brocklebank - Jonny
- Danny Edwards - Made-up Woman
- Amanda Foster - City type
- Eamon Geoghegan - Forensic
- Nick Holder - American tourist
- Dave Holland - City type
- Lisa Jacobs - Lucy
- Georgia Mackenzie - Maggie
