= The Haunter of the Dark =

Horror short story by H. P. Lovecraft

- Short story by H. P. Lovecraft
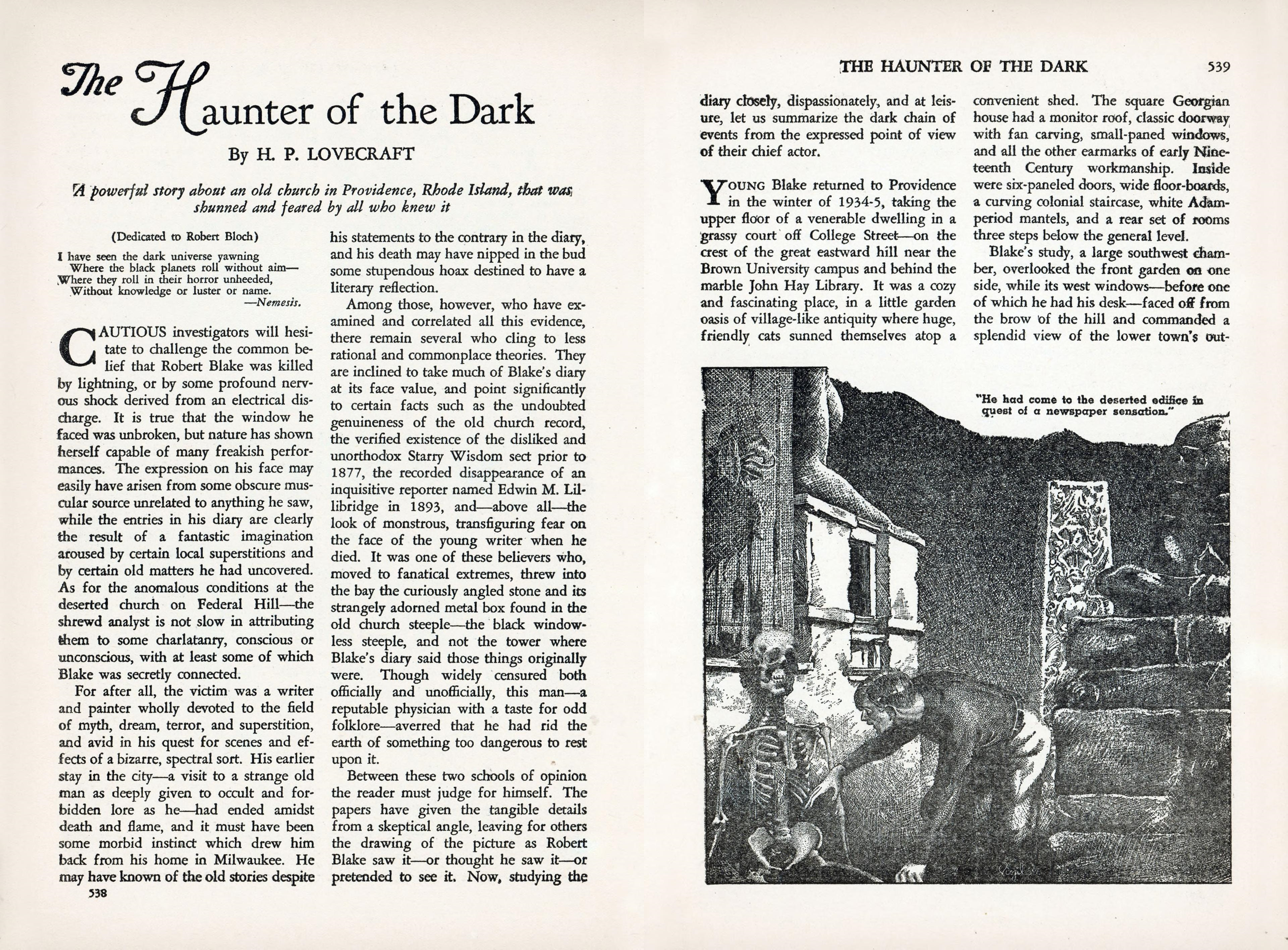
- Title page spread of "The Haunter of the Dark" as it appeared in Weird Tales, December, 1936. Illustration by Virgil Finlay.

Text available at Wikisource
- Country: United States
- Language: English
- Genre: Horror

Publication
- Published in: Weird Tales
- Publication type: Periodical
- Media type: Print (magazine)
- Publication date: December, 1936

"The Haunter of the Dark" is a horror short story by American author H. P. Lovecraft, written between 5–9 November 1935 and published in the December 1936 edition of Weird Tales (Vol. 28, No. 5, p. 538–53). It was the last written of the author's known stories (other than a few collaborations written after it) and is part of the Cthulhu Mythos. The epigraph to the story is the second stanza of Lovecraft's 1917 poem "Nemesis".

The story is a sequel to "The Shambler from the Stars" by Robert Bloch. Bloch wrote a third story in the sequence, "The Shadow from the Steeple", in 1950.

== Plot ==
In Providence, Robert Blake, a young writer with an interest in the occult, becomes fascinated by a large disused church on Federal Hill which he can see from his lodgings on the city's east side. His research reveals that the church has a sinister history involving a cult called the Church of Starry Wisdom and is dreaded by the local migrant inhabitants as being haunted by a primordial evil.

Blake enters the church and ascends the tower, where he discovers the skeleton of Edwin M. Lillibridge, a reporter who disappeared in 1893. He also discovers an ancient stone artifact known as the "Shining Trapezohedron" which has the property of being able to summon a terrible being from the depths of time and space. The trapezohedron rests in a metal box with a hinged lid; the box is incised with designs representing living but distinctly alien creatures. The whole sits atop a column which is also incised with alien designs or characters. Blake's interference inadvertently summons the malign being of the title, and he flees the church.

The being can only go abroad in darkness, and is hence constrained to the tower at night by the presence of the lights of the city. However, when the city's electrical power is weakened during a thunderstorm, the local people are terrified by the sounds coming from the church and call on their Catholic priests to lead prayers against the demon. Blake, aware of what he has let loose, also prays for the power to remain on. However, an outage occurs and the being flies towards Blake's quarters. He is subsequently found dead, staring out of his window at the church with a look of horror on his face. His last words refer to his perception of the approaching being: "I see it-- coming here-- hell-wind-- titan-blur-- black wings-- Yog-Sothoth save me-- the three-lobed burning eye..." His death is put down to a lightning strike, and a superstitious local doctor later removes the box containing the Shining Trapezohedron from the church and throws it into the Narragansett Bay.

== Characters ==
=== Robert Blake ===
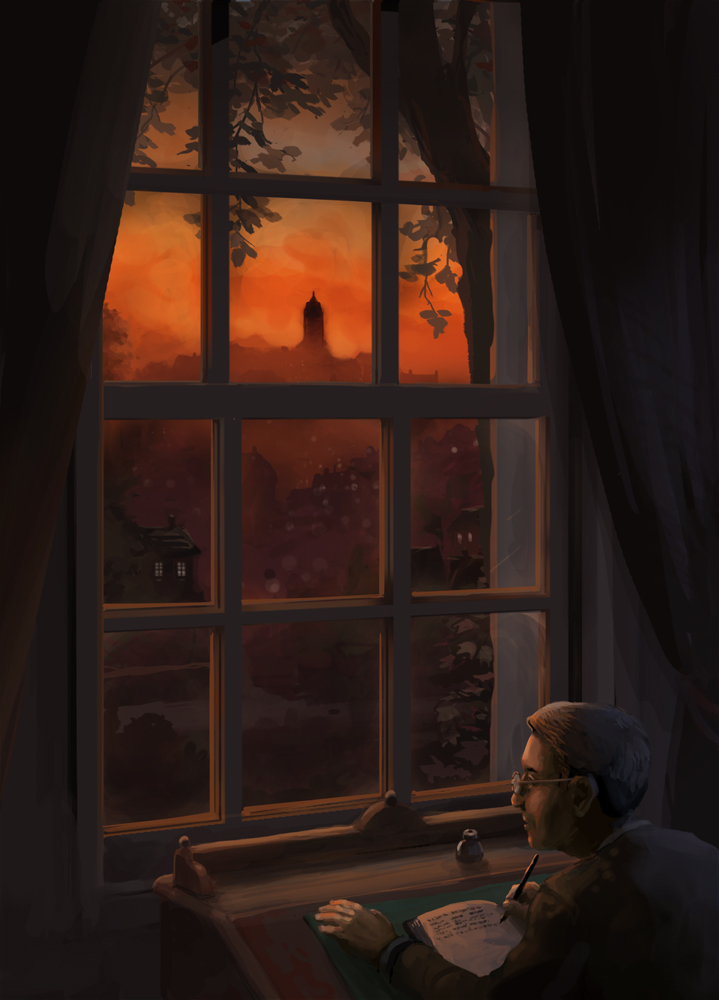
Robert Blake, as imagined by Jarkko Naas

Robert Harrison Blake is a fictional horror writer who first appears, unnamed, in Robert Bloch's 1935 story "The Shambler from the Stars". In Lovecraft's sequel, Blake dies while investigating the Starry Wisdom cult of Enoch Bowen. Lovecraft modeled Blake on Bloch, but also gave him characteristics that evoke Clark Ashton Smith and Lovecraft himself.

Lovecraft indicated in his letters with then-young writer Robert Bloch, that the character Robert Blake was an intentionally thinly veiled gesture at killing off one of his friendly correspondents. In 1936, Bloch published a story that continued the professional fun, in which Blake did not actually die, but was possessed by Nyarlathotep, and kills off a character based on Lovecraft.

Blake's death is the starting point for another sequel by Bloch, "The Shadow from the Steeple" (1950). Blake's fiction is referred to in Ramsey Campbell's "The Franklyn Paragraphs" (1973) and Philip José Farmer's "The Freshman" (1979).

Lovecraft's tale names five stories written by Robert Blake: "The Burrowers Beneath"; "Shaggai"; "The Stairs in the Crypt"; "In the Vale of Pnath" and "The Feaster from the Stars" which as Robert M. Price has pointed out are friendly spoofs of tales written by Robert Bloch (for more information, see Price's anthology The Book of Eibon (Chaosium, 2002, p. 191)). Author Lin Carter wrote stories which are pastiches of either Lovecraft or Clark Ashton Smith utilising all five titles. Shaggai is mentioned in "The Haunter of the Dark" as a planet more distant from Earth than Yuggoth; this may suggest that Blake's writing of a story with that title is a foreshadowing of his mental link with the "Haunter", which Blake believes to be an avatar of Nyarlathotep.

Brian Lumley borrowed the title The Burrowers Beneath for his first novel (1974). Fritz Leiber also used the title "The Burrower Beneath" for a story which became "The Tunneler Below" and finally "The Terror from the Depths" (in Disciples of Cthulhu Cthulhu Mythos anthology). Robert M. Price has also used the title "The Burrower Beneath" for a story set in the Eibonic mythos of Clark Ashton Smith—see Price's anthology The Book of Eibon (Chaosium, 2002).

Leigh Blackmore's poem "The Conjuration" (in his collection Spores from Sharnoth and Other Madnesses, P'rea Press, 2008) was inspired by the title "The Feaster from the Stars". Blackmore's story "The Stairs in the Crypt" (not to be confused with Lin Carter's story of the same title) was also inspired by the name of Robert Blake's tale.

=== Other characters ===
Edwin M. Lillibridge
Lillibridge was an inquisitive reporter for the Providence Telegram (a real paper) who first investigated the Church of Starry Wisdom and disappeared in 1893. Blake finds his skeleton while investigating the Free-Will Church on Federal Hill, and finds a notebook on his body. He also finds a cryptogram which he takes away to decipher and eventually deduces is written in Aklo. This cryptogram provides a history of the trapezohedron across the ages; a kind of parallel text to History of the Necronomicon. Later, Lillibridge's oddly damaged skeleton disappears from the church; it is not found when police go to investigate the reports of movement in the church steeple.
Enoch Bowen
In Lovecraft's "The Haunter of the Dark", Enoch Bowen is a renowned occultist and archaeologist who lived in Providence, Rhode Island. In 1843, Bowen earned some measure of fame when he found the tomb of the unknown pharaoh Nephren-Ka. Robert Bloch's story "The Fane of the Black Pharaoh" (Weird Tales, December 1937) is, according to Robert M. Price, "in a real sense, an 'earlier sequel' to 'The Haunter of the Dark,' as it develops Lovecraft's evocative hint, dropped in that tale, about some abominable deed wrought by the Pharaoh Nephren-Ka which caused his name to be stricken thereafter from all Egyptian stelae." A year later, Bowen mysteriously ceased his archaeological dig and returned to Providence where he founded the Church of Starry Wisdom. He dies circa 1865.
He also appears in "The Shadow from the Steeple", Robert Bloch's later sequel to "The Haunter of the Dark".
Ambrose Dexter
In "The Haunter of the Dark", he is referred to only as "superstitious Doctor Dexter", who threw the Shining Trapezohedron into "the deepest channel of Narragansett Bay" after the death of Robert Blake.
In "The Shadow From the Steeple", Bloch's sequel, the darkness of the bay's bottom gives Nyarlathotep the power to possess Dr. Dexter (who is given the first name of Ambrose). The possessed Dr. Dexter takes a position on a nuclear physics team developing advanced nuclear weapons.
Nephren-Ka
In "The Haunter of the Dark", Nephren-Ka is said to have "built around it [the Shining Trapezohedron] a temple with a windowless crypt, and did that which caused his name to be stricken from all monuments and records". The Shining Trapezohedron then remained in the ruins of the temple until it was re-discovered by Enoch Bowen in 1843.

== Inspiration ==
Lovecraft wrote this tale as a reply to "The Shambler from the Stars" (1935) by Robert Bloch, in which Bloch kills the Lovecraft-inspired character. Lovecraft returned the favor in this tale, killing off Robert Harrison Blake (aka Robert Bloch). Bloch later wrote a third story, "The Shadow from the Steeple" (1950), to create a trilogy.

Several of the surface details of the plot were taken directly from Hanns Heinz Ewers' "The Spider", which Lovecraft read in Dashiell Hammett's anthology Creeps By Night (1931).

In Blake's final notes, he refers to "Roderick Usher", an allusion to Edgar Allan Poe's "The Fall of the House of Usher", which Lovecraft described in "Supernatural Horror in Literature" as featuring "an abnormally linked trinity of entities...a brother, his twin sister, and their incredibly ancient house all sharing a single soul and meeting one common dissolution at the same moment." An H. P. Lovecraft Encyclopedia suggests that this interpretation is the key to understanding the ending of "The Haunter of the Dark": "[W]e are to believe that the entity in the church--the Haunter of the Dark, described as an avatar of Nyarlathotep--has possessed Blake's mind but, at the moment of doing so, is struck by lightning and killed, and Blake dies as well."

== Connections with other tales ==
- The Shining Trapezohedron is mentioned as having been fashioned on Yuggoth, an outpost of the Mi-Go mentioned in "The Whisperer in Darkness".
- "It (i.e. The Shining Trapezohedron) was treasured and placed in its curious box by the crinoid things of Antarctica", suggesting a connection with the Elder Things from At the Mountains of Madness.
- The Serpent Men of Valusia also held possession of the Shining Trapezohedron at one point, connecting it to the Kull tales of Robert E. Howard.
- The "catacombs of Nephren-Ka" are mentioned as the haunt of ghouls in "The Outsider", and Nephren-Ka is mentioned as the Pharaoh who built a temple with a lightless crypt to the Shining Trapezohedron and "did that which caused his name to be stricken from all monuments and records".
- The events of this story are alluded to in The Illuminatus! Trilogy, in which they are depicted as having actually happened, and Lovecraft's story having been inspired by them.
- The Shining Trapezohedron, along with several other aspects of "The Haunter of the Dark" and Lovecraftian horror in general, are central to the plot of Edward Lee's 2009 book Haunter of the Threshold.
- Fritz Leiber's 1977 novel Our Lady of Darkness features a horror writer, aware of Lovecraft's story, who becomes fascinated by a place visible from his San Francisco window, and decides to visit it.

== Reception ==
In a discussion of Lovecraft's work, Fritz Leiber described the "Haunter of the Dark" as "one of his finer tales (and his last)". The horror historian R. S. Hadji included "The Haunter of the Dark" on his list of the most frightening horror stories.

== Adaptations ==
- Gene Colan illustrated a ten-page comic-book adaptation in Marvel's Journey into Mystery #4 (1973).
- Alberto Breccia illustrated a seventeen-page adaptation in 1975.
- John Coulthart illustrated another version of the story in 1988 that was reprinted in The Haunter of the Dark: And Other Grotesque Visions in 1999.
- Swiss composer Franco Cesarini adapted the story into a tone poem for symphonic band of the same name in 1995.
- Robert Cappelletto took elements of the story for his 2009 feature film Pickman's Muse.
- Gou Tanabe adapted the story into a manga in 2016.
- Julian Simpson released a fourth season of his BBC Radio 4 podcast series The Lovecraft Investigations adapting The Haunter of the Dark in October 2023.

== The Robert Bloch Award ==
The Robert Bloch Award is presented at the annual Necronomicon convention. Its recipient in 2013 was editor and scholar S. T. Joshi. The award is in the shape of the Shining Trapezohedron.

== Sources ==
- Lovecraft, Howard P. "The Haunter of the Dark" (1936) in The Dunwich Horror and Others, S. T. Joshi (ed.), Sauk City, WI: Arkham House, 1984. ISBN 0-87054-037-8. Definitive version.
- Lovecraft, Howard P. (1999) [1936]. "The Haunter of the Dark". In S. T. Joshi; Peter Cannon (eds.). More Annotated Lovecraft (1st ed.). New York City, NY: Dell. ISBN 0-440-50875-4. With explanatory footnotes.
