= Superstorm (film) =

- Genre: docudrama
- Written by: Julian Simpson
- Directed by: Julian Simpson
- Starring: Nicola Stephenson; Tom Sizemore; Chris Potter; JR Bourne; Cas Anvar; Nicolas Wright; Jana Carpenter
- Country of origin: United Kingdom
- No. of episodes: 3

Production
- Producer: BBC/Discovery Channel/ProSieben
- Running time: 177 minutes (3x59 minutes)

Original release
- Network: BBC One
- Release: 15 April – 29 April 2007

Superstorm is a three-part British docudrama miniseries written and directed by Julian Simpson, about a group of scientists that try to divert and weaken hurricanes using cloud seeding.

Superstorm originally aired on BBC One for a period of three weeks, totaling three 59 minute episodes, from 15 April 2007 to 29 April 2007. Each episode was followed by a half-hour documentary on BBC Two on extreme weather monitoring and forecasting, called The Science of Superstorms. The series was also aired (after being edited for content) on the Discovery Channel in the U.S. and Canada during the summer of 2007.

Superstorm is a co-production of BBC Worldwide, Discovery Channel and ProSieben, in association with M6 and NHK. Ailsa Orr and Michael Mosley, who made also Supervolcano, are the executive producers for BBC, while Jack E. Smith is the executive producer and David J. Smolar as Production Coordinator for the Discovery Channel.

The miniseries was released on DVD in the United Kingdom on 2 July 2007.

== Plot ==
The movie begins with a team of scientists working on a US government project, known as Stormshield, whose goal is to control and manage storms, particularly hurricanes.

Hurricane Grace, a Category 3 hurricane which is slowly climbing to a Category 5, is up to hit the United States. Using a predictive technology named Tempest and developed by Lance Resznick, they are able to simulate the effects of seeding the storm in order to collapse the eye of the storm and then decrease its intensity.

Lance is openly skeptical towards the theories of Sara Hughes, an English scientist who is convinced about the effectiveness of cloud seeding. An experiment is done on a smaller hurricane, Agatha. A plane and several UAV carrying the seeds (in this case, supercooled liquid) fly into the storm. At first, the experiment is a success but then the storm intensifies during the seeding and the plane crashes.

Weeks go by and Grace has now become a category 5 hurricane, headed straight for Miami. At the urgings of Katzenberg, the fund seeker of the project, the team formulates a plan of distant atmospheric perturbation to deflect Grace out into the Atlantic Ocean by creating a low pressure system on the Pacific coast and allowing it to be carried across the nation towards the hurricane.

While the team leader Abrams and mathematician Munish Loomba try to model the weather perturbation that will safely deflect Grace, Lance tells Sara that her attempt to change Agatha's course after the seeding was actually successful. Discussing such results with her grandfather, who was head of a similar, discredited project in the 1970s, Sara discovers that he and his team knew they could make hurricanes change course but made their efforts appear fruitless because they realized that the military were behind the project, looking for ways to use weather as a weapon. The same turns out to be true for Stormshield, even if Katzenberg had previously assured that there was no military involvement.

Meanwhile, the low pressure system approach has been finalized, with B-52 bombers ready to release trails of carbon over the West Coast. Just before proceeding with the operation, Lance states that the attempt must be stopped as another storm is moving up and could deflect Grace back into the USA. Unimpressed, Katzenberg fires the whole team, who refuses to take such a high risk.

The team soon learns that the operation went on even if they did not provide the necessary data to the flying squad. The mole in the team turns out to be Bengali-born Munish, who lost his family in a hurricane while still a child and now desperate to make the theory of hurricane deflection work.

The other storm did deflect Grace, now headed right for New York City. After realizing that in the first experiment the course of Agatha was altered by the supercooling of the areas of the storm, the team decides to apply the same method. They manage to slightly deviate the storm away from New York City, thus causing smaller damage, but cannot avoid that Long Island, where the Stormshield headquarters are located, is hit.

Sara is the only member of the team who survives without severe injuries and the series finishes with her about to either admit the terrible tragedy caused by their research or, as Katzenberg would want, lie to cover it up and suggest to the American people and to the whole world that the technology did work and is to be expanded.

== Cast ==
- Nicola Stephenson as Sara Hughes
- Tom Sizemore as Katzenberg
- Chris Potter as Dan Abrams
- JR Bourne as Lance Resnick
- Cas Anvar as Munish Loomba
- Nicolas Wright as Ralf DeWitt
- Emily Tilson as Emily Abrams
- Jana Carpenter as Holly Zabrieski

== See also ==
- Supervolcano, a 2005 docudrama by the same producers
- Superstorm
- Cloud seeding
