= Serious & Organised =

- Genre: Crime drama
- Written by: Matt Jones; Matthew Graham; Oliver Brown
- Directed by: Lance Kneeshaw; Diarmuid Lawrence
- Starring: Martin Kemp; Joe Duttine; Danny Sapani; Emily Bruni; James Hillier; Esther Hall; Mark Leadbetter
- Country of origin: United Kingdom
- Original language: English
- No. of series: 1
- No. of episodes: 6 (list of episodes)

Production
- Executive producers: Steve Christian; George Faber; Charles Pattinson
- Producer: Matt Jones
- Production location: United Kingdom
- Running time: 45 minutes
- Production companies: Company Pictures; Isle of Man Film

Original release
- Network: ITV
- Release: 2 January – 6 February 2003

Serious & Organised is a British crime drama television series, created by Matt Jones, and broadcast on ITV from 2 January to 6 February 2003. Created as a star vehicle for lead actor Martin Kemp, only one series was commissioned owing to the show not achieving the ratings expected by the network, despite a consistent consolidated viewing audience of between 6 and 7 million. A total of six episodes were broadcast. The complete series has since been released for streaming on YouTube by production company All3Media on 8 April 2011.

== Plot ==
Jack (Martin Kemp) and Tony Finn (Joe Duttine) are two brothers working together in the same division of the National Serious and Organised Crime Unit. Being the only officers of their kind, they are feared by colleagues and criminals alike. Jack, however, is leading a secret double life – having fallen in love with Tony's wife, Rachel (Esther Hall). Forced to put their personal differences aside for the sake of their profession, Jack and Tony investigate the likes of crime families, Triads, gangland killings, extortion and major drug suppliers, all whilst trying to battle with their own demons.

The series begins with the arrival of a new boss, DI Dennis Clifton (Danny Sapani), who replaces the outgoing DI Kitchen (Sidney Livingstone). Clifton immediately makes it clear that he will not stand for any nonsense, and is determined to lead the unit his way. Alongside the Finn brothers are DC Joanna Granger (Emily Bruni) and DC Graham Reid (James Hillier). During the team's second case, it transpires that Reid has secret connections to a gangland murderer, forcing him to go on the run. Granger also finds herself under the spotlight after embarking on an affair with Tony Finn, which subsequently sparks a relationship between Jack Finn and his brother's wife, Rachel. DC Pete Gordon (Mark Leadbetter) is a junior member of the team who also assists the Finn brothers on various cases.

== Production ==
Valerie Lilley was initially announced to play the part of Jeannie Finn, Jack and Tony's mother. However, Lilley pulled out shortly before filming began, forcing every episode to be partially re-written. Her part was not re-cast. Although credited on IMDb, Lilley did not appear in the series.

D.C. Pete Gordon (Mark Leadbetter) is also sometimes erroneously referred to as D.C. Pete Burns, but was never credited as such in the series.

Danny Dyer, Nina Sosanya, Neil Stuke and Amanda Mealing all guest starred in the series.

== Cast ==
- Martin Kemp as D.C. Jack Finn, senior detective
- Joe Duttine as D.C. Tony Finn, senior detective
- Esther Hall as Rachel Finn, Tony's wife
- Danny Sapani as D.I. Dennis Clifton, commanding officer
- Emily Bruni as D.C. Joanna Granger, junior detective
- James Hillier as D.C. Graham Reid, junior detective (Episodes 1–2)
- Mark Leadbetter as D.C. Pete Gordon, junior detective
- Sidney Livingstone as D.I. Kitchen, commanding officer (Episode 1)

== Episode list ==
No.	Title	Directed by	Written by	British air date	UK viewers (million)
1	"Unfaithful"	Diarmuid Lawrence	Matt Jones	2 January 2003	6.05m
Jack and Tony resort to no-nonsense, unconventional methods after a security van heist, and Jack discovers Tony is being unfaithful.
2	"Deal with the Devil"	Diarmuid Lawrence	Tom Grieves	9 January 2003	6.06m
The squad are on the tail of Jimmy Fisk, a gangland criminal responsible for a series of gruesome murders. They arrest one of his heavies, hit man Steve Fallon, in the hope of doing a deal to secure information which could lead to Fisk's arrest. Fallon reveals that Fisk has ordered him to murder his brother, following a recent betrayal in which he stole a substantial amount of money. Tony is sent undercover during an illegal boxing match arranged by Fisk, during which the hit is due to take place – but somehow the operation is blown, and the murder is committed. Fisk is arrested, but Tony is blamed for the botched operation. Fallon, on the run, decides to take revenge on Tony by threatening Rachel and the children with a knife. They are moved into a safehouse with Joanna. Later, during a CCTV review of the operation, Jack realises that it wasn't Tony who blew it, and that Fisk spotted someone else – Graham Reid. Tony and Jack confront Graham, who confirms that he recently discovered that a bookmaker he owed money to was an employee of Fisk. When they discover Reid was forced to give up the location of the safehouse whilst at gunpoint, Tony and Jack realise Rachel may be in grave danger.
3	"Human Trade"	Lance Kneeshaw	Matt Jones	16 January 2003	6.41m
Jack and Tony track a heroin dealer through customs, but unwittingly stumble upon a network trading in human organs. They deliver a live heart to its intended recipient in order to find out who is involved with the British side of the operation. They discover that a desperate father, Wilson, has paid for the heart to be shipped from Brazil for his son, who doctors say has less than a week to live. Jack strikes a deal with Wilson, allowing the operation to go ahead, in return for information on the dealers who sold him the heart. Jack strikes up a rapport with doctor Emma Brown, who offers to investigate her boss, Shearer. Meanwhile, Jack's true feelings for Rachel continue to grow when one of the children accidentally inhales rat poison, and has to be taken to casualty. Tony and Jack go undercover to meet with the organ suppliers, before Emma closes the net on Shearer. Wilson is worried that, with all of the main suspects in custody, his son's operation might be in jeopardy – and so he decides to take drastic measures by taking Shearer hostage until he has completed the operation. Clifton is unsure whether Jack's methods will pay off – and they are soon put to the test during a complication in the operation.
4	"Nice Little Earner"	Lance Kneeshaw	Matthew Graham	23 January 2003	6.17m
Jack and Tony are involved in a raid on an antiques warehouse which is being used for money laundering. Drugs and vice baron John Creeves isn't happy that his nice little earner has been ruined – and he's determined heads will roll. Jack's main priority is to protect his informant, company employee Claire. However, when the warehouse auctioneer, Richie, is found with both his arms amputated, Jack realises that Creeves isn't messing around. When Claire later disappears, Jack suspects she may have arranged to meet a mystery lover, and discovers that it is none other than Joe Margolis, Creeves' second in command. When Margolis is stabbed by a heavy sent by Creeves, Claire is taken into witness protection, and Jack offers to look after her four-month-old baby, but instead palms him off on Rachel. Tony is tasked with ensuring Claire's safety, but his suspicions grow when he discovers that she has been taking private IT classes, and has given her tutor private copies of company files. When Tony discovers that Claire has siphoned more than £90,000 from Creeves' accounts, he realises that Jack and the team have been double-crossed, and that Claire is using them for her own agenda.
5	"Greed"	Lance Kneeshaw	Oliver Brown	30 January 2003	6.67m
Jack is determined to nail seedy John Sands after four teenage prostitutes from Albania are killed in a massage parlour blaze. With evidence relating young Darren Evans to the scene of the crime, Jack suspects that Evans may have been set-up by Sands, but he needs the help of a former prostitute, Maggie King, to prove his theory. Jack and Tony interview a former customer of the massage parlour, who claims that shortly after his visit, he was blackmailed for £2,000 to prevent his wife from finding out about his illicit wrongdoing. When he receives a second blackmail letter ordering him to drop a further £2,000 at Liverpool Street station, Jack and Tony organise surveillance on the drop and discover the blackmailer is none other than Maggie King. They subsequently discover that under the watchful eye of Evans, a further four girls have entered the country, and organise a raid in the hope of catching both Evans and Sands in the act. Meanwhile, Jack struggles to contain his feelings for Rachel, unaware that Tony is watching on as the pair share a passionate kiss, leaving Tony with no option but to reluctantly approach Clifton and ask for a transfer out of the squad.
6	"Room on My Horse"	Diarmuid Lawrence	Matt Jones	6 February 2003	6.61m
With the ever increasing number of dealers on the streets, Jack and Tony decide to well and truly plant a bomb underneath the Abbott brothers, a pair of the most notorious drug dealers ever to operate in East London. They discover that heroin is being smuggled in through an electrical trade dealer operating in a warehouse close to a private airport. After they force him to reveal his links to the Abbotts, Clifton organises a dawn raid. Colin Abbott is arrested, but Phillip Abbott manages to escape, shooting Joanne Granger in the arm. Meanwhile, Jack discovers Tony's request for a transfer, and confronts him, unaware of the fact that his infidelity has been discovered. Tony responds by storming off, unaware that Phillip Abbott is firmly on his tail, determined to secure his brother's freedom. Tony is kidnapped, forcing Jack to break all of the rules in order to secure his safety. After assaulting a suspect, threatening a brief and having a showdown with Clifton, Jack finally pinpoints a location where he suspects Tony may be being held. But with armed response more than five minutes away, will he risk his own safety to save his brother's life? Or is it already too late?
