= Nicola Walker =

British actress (born 1970)

- Walker in 2026
- Born: Nicola Jane Walker; 15 May 1970 (age 56); London, England
- Education: New Hall, Cambridge (BA)
- Occupation: Actor
- Years active: 1990–present
- Known for: Spooks; The Split; Unforgotten; The Curious Incident of the Dog in the Night-Time
- Spouse: Barnaby Kay
- Children: 1
- Relatives: Richard Kay (father-in-law)
- Awards: Laurence Olivier Award for Best Actress in a Supporting Role

Nicola Jane Walker (born 15 May 1970) is an English actress, known for her starring roles in various British television programmes from the 1990s onwards, including that of Ruth Evershed in the spy drama Spooks (2003–2006 and 2009–2011), DCI Cassie Stuart in Unforgotten (2015–2021) and Hannah Stern in The Split (2018–2024). She has also worked in theatre, radio and film. She won the 2013 Olivier Award for Best Supporting Actress for the play The Curious Incident of the Dog in the Night-Time and was twice nominated for the BAFTA TV Award for Best Supporting Actress for the BBC drama Last Tango in Halifax.

Her voice roles include Doctor Who companion Liv Chenka in various Big Finish audio plays (2011–present) and Eleanor Peck in The Lovecraft Investigations (2019–2023).

== Early life ==
Walker was born in Stepney in the East End of London and has an older brother. She attended Saint Nicholas School at Old Harlow in Essex, and Forest School, Walthamstow. She undertook acting classes from the age of 12 in order to speak to boys. Interviewed in 2014 by The Daily Telegraph, she said, "I was really encouraged by my mother. My dad thought it was a ridiculous thing to do."

Walker studied English at New Hall, Cambridge, becoming the first member of her family to go to university. She started her acting career with the Cambridge Footlights. Her contemporaries included Spooks writer David Wolstencroft and comedian Sue Perkins, who were all part of the 1990 national tour.

Perkins, then an older undergraduate, was assigned to be her "college mother". Walker later said: "She was the worst college mother I could have had. They're meant to hold your hand. She asked to borrow my bike, got drunk, and I never saw it again." Walker acted with Perkins, and they reunited when Perkins gave Walker a role in Heading Out.

== Career ==
Offered a place at the Royal Academy of Dramatic Art on graduation from Cambridge, Walker already had some roles and an agent, so she decided to pursue her acting career. Based in London, she shared a flat with Perkins, Sarah Phelps, and Emma Kennedy. She acted at the Edinburgh Festival and the London Festival Fringe.

=== Television ===
Walker's first major television roles were in 1997, as Gypsy Jones in Channel 4's adaptation of A Dance to the Music of Time, and as English teacher Suzy Travis in two series of Steven Moffat's school-based sitcom Chalk. She has also appeared in guest roles in episodes of series such as Dalziel and Pascoe, Jonathan Creek, Pie in the Sky, and Broken News.

She played the leading part of DI Susan Taylor in the ITV thriller serial Touching Evil in 1997, co-starring opposite Robson Green. She also appeared in its two sequel serials in 1998 and 1999. Also in 1999, she took the lead role in the post-apocalyptic drama serial The Last Train, also screened on ITV (and written by future Spooks writer Matthew Graham). Also in 2003, Walker played Molly Millions in the BBC Radio adaptation of Neuromancer by William Gibson.

In 2003, with the production team of Kudos Television looking to replace the character played by Jenny Agutter in Series 1 of Spooks, the part of Ruth Evershed was specially written for Walker from Series 2. She remained with the show until the fifth series, during the production of which it was announced she was expecting her first child and would be leaving. She returned in 2009 and continued until the series ended in 2011. Benji Wilson of The Daily Telegraph praised Walker's performance, stating: "an actress who has squeezed every drop out of TV's greatest ever largely dumbstruck doormat for the best part of a decade. Her scenes with Peter Firth, another fine player, have become self-contained little bubbles of weltschmerz within every recent episode."

In 2007, Walker had a prominent supporting role as a child snatcher in the ITV1 drama serial Torn and appeared in the BBC adaptation of Oliver Twist.

In 2009, she appeared as a maid in a new BBC adaptation of Henry James' The Turn of the Screw, which also starred Michelle Dockery and Sue Johnston. In 2010, Walker appeared as a beleaguered wife (Linda Shand) of a murderer in an episode of the BBC One crime thriller Luther.

In February 2011, she appeared as nervous social worker Wendy in the BBC TV series Being Human. In February 2012, she played a major character in the one off BBC crime drama Inside Men.

From 2012 to 2020, she appeared as Gillian Greenwood (née Buttershaw) alongside Derek Jacobi, Anne Reid and Sarah Lancashire in five series of the BBC original drama Last Tango in Halifax. Walker was twice nominated (2014, 2017) for a Television BAFTA for Best Supporting Actress for this role.

In February and March 2013, Walker reunited with her former Cambridge Footlights colleague Sue Perkins in the BBC comedy Heading Out. She then appeared in the second series of Prisoners' Wives and the third series of Scott & Bailey playing Helen Bartlett.

In 2015, she appeared as Jackie "Stevie" Stevenson, the colleague of DI John River played by Stellan Skarsgård, in the BBC drama series River.

Walker starred, alongside actor Sanjeev Bhaskar, in series one through four (2015–2021) of the ITV drama series Unforgotten as DCI Cassie Stuart.

From 2018 to 2022, Walker starred as Hannah Defoe Stern, a divorce lawyer, in all three series of the BBC drama series The Split. Also in 2018, she played Reverend Jane Oliver in the BBC2 serial Collateral.

Walker was number 10 on the Radio Times TV 100 list for 2018, a list said to be determined by television executives and broadcasting veterans.

In 2021, she starred in the British crime drama television series Annika, based on the BBC Radio 4 drama Annika Stranded, with Walker reprising the title role. Produced by Black Camel Pictures for Alibi and All3Media, the first episode aired on 17 August 2021. This is the eighth different police officer or detective role she has played on British TV. In August 2022, it was announced that a second series of Annika had been commissioned. On 20 May 2023, the first series of Annika began airing on BBC One.

In 2022, Walker appeared in Stefan Golaszewski's drama, Marriage alongside Sean Bean. The series received mixed reviews from both critics and viewers.

In 2024, Walker appeared in the Sky Atlantic TV series Mary & George as Lady Elizabeth Hatton.

=== Theatre ===
Walker won an Olivier Award in 2013 for Best Supporting Actress in her role as Judy, the main character Christopher's mother, in The Curious Incident of the Dog in the Night-Time. The play won seven Olivier Awards, equalling Matilda the Musical's record win in 2012.

In 2014, she starred alongside Mark Strong and Phoebe Fox in Arthur Miller's play A View from the Bridge, at the Young Vic theatre. The play received extremely positive reviews from critics and transferred to Wyndham's Theatre in London's West End in 2015 and to the Lyceum Theatre on Broadway.

In 2022 she starred as Miss Lily Moffat in the National Theatre revival in London of The Corn is Green, the 1938 autobiographical play by Emlyn Williams.

=== Film ===
In film, Walker's roles have tended to be smaller supporting parts. Her most prominent role was as one half of the folk duo in Four Weddings and a Funeral (1994), who sing "Can't Smile Without You" during the first church service and "Stand By Your Man" at the reception. She also appeared in the feature film adaptation of the television series Thunderbirds (2004).

In 2005, she portrayed a British journalist caught up in the Rwandan genocide in Shooting Dogs.

=== Audio ===
In 2002, Walker co-starred in the BBC radio production of William Gibson's cyberpunk novel Neuromancer.

In July 2011, she played the significant supporting role of Medtech Liv Chenka in the Big Finish Productions Doctor Who audio drama Robophobia, opposite Sylvester McCoy as the Seventh Doctor. The Chenka character proved popular both with producers and listeners, and in February 2014 Walker returned to the role, this time as a foil for Paul McGann's Eighth Doctor in Dark Eyes 2. The character was sustained throughout Dark Eyes 3 and Dark Eyes 4, at the end of which it was revealed that Chenka was to continue as the Doctor's established travelling companion. Walker returned to the role in the follow-up four-volume Doom Coalition, Ravenous and Stranded. Walker reprised the role of Chenka in 2022 in The Eighth Doctor Adventures: What Lies Inside? and The Eighth Doctor Adventures: Connections. She also played the role in an 18-part series titled The Robots, starring alongside Claire Rushbrook. In 2017, she starred in the company's adaptation of the H. G. Wells novel The Shape of Things to Come.

Since 2013, Walker has voiced the Norwegian detective Annika Strandhed in the BBC Radio 4 drama series Annika Stranded by Nick Walker. From 2018 to 2023 she played the role of Dr. Eleanor Peck in the BBC Radio 4 production The Lovecraft Investigations alongside her husband Barnaby Kay.

== Personal life ==
Walker met actor Barnaby Kay when they worked together with the Out of Joint Theatre Company, in a 1994 touring production of The Man of Mode and The Libertine; they married in 2006, and have a son together.

== Filmography ==
=== Film ===
| Year | Film | Role |
|---|---|---|
| 1994 | Four Weddings and a Funeral | Frightful folk duo member – Wedding One |
| 2000 | Shiner | Det. Sgt. Garland |
| 2004 | Thunderbirds | Panhead's Mother |
| 2005 | Shooting Dogs | Rachel |
| 2014 | Second Coming | Counsellor |

=== Television ===
| Year | Title | Role | Notes |
|---|---|---|---|
| 1994 | Milner | Colette Brustein | TV movie |
| 1994 | Faith | Sallie Grace | TV movie |
| 1996 | The Fortunes and Misfortunes of Moll Flanders | Lucy Diver | Episode 4 |
| 1997 | Pie in the Sky | Carol | Episode: "In the Smoke" |
| 1997 | Cows | Shirley Johnson | Pilot episode |
| 1997 | A Dance to the Music of Time | Gypsy Jones | Episode: "The Twenties" |
| 1997 | Chalk | Suzy Travis | Main cast |
| 1997–1999 | Touching Evil | Susan Taylor/D.I. Susan Taylor | Main cast |
| 1998 | Jonathan Creek | WPC Fay Radnor | Episode: "Mother Redcap" |
| 1999 | The Last Train | Harriet Ambrose | Main cast |
| 2000 | Dalziel and Pascoe | Abbie Hallingsworth | Episode: "A Sweeter Lazarus" |
| 2001 | People Like Us | Helen Meredith | Episode: "The Journalist" |
| 2003–2006, 2009–2011 | Spooks | Ruth Evershed | Main cast (Series 2–5, 8–10) |
| 2004 | Red Cap | Maj. Rebecca Garton | Episode: "Fighting Fit" |
| 2005 | Broken News | Katie Willard | 3 episodes |
| 2007 | Torn | Joanna Taylor | Main cast |
| 2007 | Oliver Twist | Sally | TV movie |
| 2009 | The Turn of the Screw | Carla | TV movie |
| 2010 | Luther | Linda Shand | Episode: "#1.4" |
| 2010 | Law & Order: UK | Daniela Renzo | Episode: "ID" |
| 2011 | Being Human | Wendy | Episode: "The Longest Day" |
| 2012 | Inside Men | Kirsty Coniston | Main cast |
| 2012 | New Tricks | Helen Hadley | Episode: "Old School Ties" |
| 2012 | A Mother's Son | DC Sue Upton | Main cast |
| 2012–2020 | Last Tango in Halifax | Gillian Greenwood | Main cast Nominated—BAFTA TV Award for Best Supporting Actress; Nominated—Satellite Award for Best Supporting Actress – Series, Miniseries or Television Film |
| 2013 | Prisoners' Wives | DCI Jo Fontaine | Recurring role (Series 2) |
| 2013 | Heading Out | Justine | Main cast |
| 2013 | Scott & Bailey | Helen Bartlett | Recurring role (Series 3) |
| 2014 | Babylon | Sharon Franklin, Assistant Commissioner | Main cast |
| 2015–2021 | Unforgotten | DCI Cassie Stuart | Main cast (Series 1–4) |
| 2015 | River | DS Jackie "Stevie" Stevenson | Main cast |
| 2018 | Collateral | Jane Oliver | Main cast, miniseries |
| 2018 | Inside No 9 | Harriet | Episode: "To Have and to Hold" |
| 2018–2024 | The Split | Hannah Stern | Main cast |
| 2021–2023 | Annika | DI Annika Strandhed | Title role |
| 2022 | Marriage | Emma | Main cast |
| 2024 | Mary & George | Elizabeth Hatton | Main cast, miniseries |
| 2026 | Alice and Steve | Alice | Main cast |

=== Video games ===
| Year | Title | Voice role |
|---|---|---|
| 2011 | The Witcher 2: Assassins of Kings | Síle de Tansarville |
| 2012 | 007 Legends | Teresa di Vicenzo |
| 2015 | The Witcher 3: Wild Hunt | Síle de Tansarville |

=== Audio ===
| Year | Title | Role | Notes |
|---|---|---|---|
| 2002 | Neuromancer | Molly | |
| 2007 | BBC Radio 4: Fragments | Mrs. Wilson | |
| 2008 | BBC Radio 4: The Listener | Dr. Annika Gruber | |
| 2011 | BBC Radio 4: Bad Memories | Rachel Weir and Bisa | |
| 2011 | Doctor Who: The Monthly Adventures | Liv Chenka | Episode: Robophobia |
| 2013 | BBC Radio 4: Kokomo | Alice Price | |
| 2014–present | Doctor Who: The Eighth Doctor Adventures | Liv Chenka | 64 episodes |
| 2015 | BBC Radio 4: Fugue State | Dr Fallon | |
| 2016 | The Circuit | Marty | TV movie |
| 2018 | BBC Radio 4: Mythos | Mary Lairre | |
| 2019–2023 | The Robots | Liv Chenka | 15 episodes |
| 2022 | Doctor Who: The Ninth Doctor Adventures | Liv Chenka | Episode: "Flatpack" |
| 2013–2020 | Annika Stranded | Annika Strandhed | |
| 2019–2023 | BBC Radio 4: The Lovecraft Investigations | Eleanor Peck and Mary Lairre | |
| 2022 | BBC Radio 4: Who Is Aldrich Kemp? | Alice Boone | |
| 2023 | BBC Radio 4: Who Killed Aldrich Kemp? | Alice Boone | |

== Theatre credits ==
- Relocated – Royal Court Theatre London (2008)
- Gethsemane – National Theatre London (2008/9)
- Season's Greetings – National Theatre London (2010/11)
- Di and Viv and Rose – Hampstead Theatre (Downstairs) London (2011)
- The Curious Incident of the Dog in the Night-Time – National Theatre London (2012) for which she won the 2013 Olivier Award in the category Best Actress in a Supporting Role
- A View from the Bridge – Young Vic/Wyndham's Theatre (West End) London (2014/15), Lyceum Theatre on Broadway (2015/16)
- The Corn is Green – National Theatre London (2022)
- Unicorn – Garrick Theatre London (2025)
- The Unbelievers – Royal Court Theatre London (2025)

== Accolades ==
| Year | Award | Category | Nominated work | Result | Ref |
|---|---|---|---|---|---|
| 2013 | Laurence Olivier Awards | Best Supporting Actress | The Curious Incident of the Dog in the Night-Time | Won | |
| 2014 | British Academy Television Awards | Best Supporting Actress | Last Tango in Halifax | Nominated | |
| 2014 | Satellite Awards | Best Supporting Actress in a Series, Miniseries or Television Film | Last Tango in Halifax | Nominated | |
| 2016 | Drama Desk Awards | Outstanding Actress in a Play | A View from the Bridge | Nominated | |
| 2016 | Outer Critics Circle Awards | Outstanding Actress in a Play | A View from the Bridge | Nominated | |
| 2016 | Broadcasting Press Guild Awards | Best Actress | River and Unforgotten | Nominated | |
| 2017 | British Academy Television Awards | Best Supporting Actress | Last Tango in Halifax | Nominated | |
| 2021 | Audie Awards | Audio Drama | Doctor Who: Stranded | Won | |
| 2021 | TV Times Awards | Favourite Actress | Unforgotten | Nominated | |
| 2022 | TV Choice Awards | Best Actress | The Split | Nominated | |
| 2022 | National Television Awards | Drama Performance | The Split | Nominated | |
| 2023 | Laurence Olivier Awards | Best Actress | The Corn Is Green | Nominated | |
