= Phoebe Fox =

British actress (born 1987)

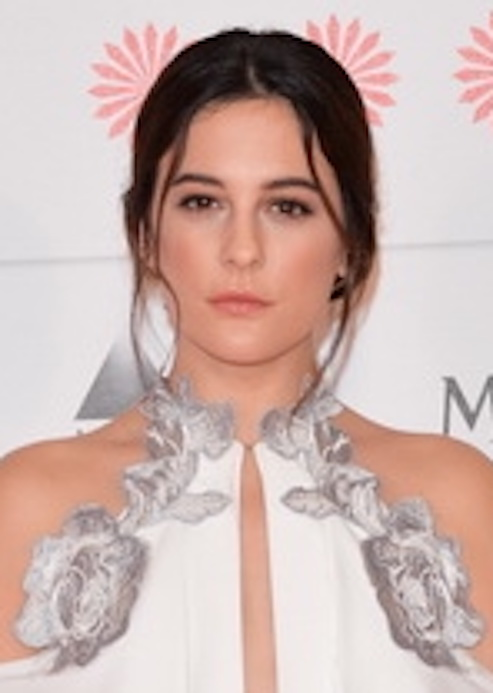
- Fox in 2014
- Born: Phoebe Mercedes Fox; 16 April 1987 (age 39); Hammersmith, London, England
- Education: Royal Academy of Dramatic Art
- Occupation: Actress
- Years active: 2010–present
- Spouse: Kyle Soller (m. 2010)

Phoebe Mercedes Fox (born 16 April 1987) is an English actress of stage and screen. For her work in theatre, she was nominated for a Laurence Olivier Award and a Standard Theatre Award. On screen, she is known for her television roles in The Hollow Crown: Wars of the Roses (2016), The Great (2020–2023), and War (2026).

== Early life ==
Fox is the daughter of "jobbing actors" Stuart Fox and Prue Clarke. Despite their profession and surname, there is no relation to the Fox acting dynasty. Phoebe Fox grew up in West London.

Fox was educated at Chiswick School, and trained at the Royal Academy of Dramatic Art (RADA).

== Career ==
In 2010, Fox made her debut acting appearance in the play A Month in the Country at the Chichester Festival Theatre. The following year she starred in As You Like It at the Rose Theatre, The Acid Test at the Royal Court Theatre upstairs and There Is A War at the National Theatre as part of their Double Feature in the Paintframe. Based on these performances she was nominated for the 2011Standard Theatre Award for Milton Shulman Award for Outstanding Newcomer. Fox was included in the 2011 Screen International Stars of Tomorrow list.

In 2012, Fox appeared as Grace in Switch, a TV series about witches living in a city. In 2014 she appeared in The Musketeers as the Duchess of Savoy; in A Poet in New York as Liz Reitell, and also as Eve Perkins in The Woman in Black 2: Angel of Death.

In 2014 Fox was nominated for Laurence Olivier Award for Best Actress in a Supporting Role for her performance in A View from the Bridge at the Young Vic, alongside Mark Strong who won best actor. In 2015, Fox starred as Vanessa Bell in Life in Squares, a BBC drama about the Bloomsbury Group and in the thriller film Eye in the Sky.

From 2020 to 2023, Fox starred as Marial, a main character in The Great alongside co-stars Elle Fanning and Nicholas Hoult. She was part of the ensemble nominated for Screen Actors Guild Award for Outstanding Cast in a Comedy Series.

== Personal life ==
Fox is married to actor Kyle Soller, whom she met at RADA. They live in London.

== Selected credits ==
=== Film and television ===
Year	Title	Role	Notes	Ref.
2011	One Day	Nightclub Girl		
2011	Black Mirror	Hallam	Episode: "The Entire History of You"	
2012	Coming Up	Masha Hawkins	Episode: "If We Dead Awaken"	
2012	New Tricks	Eleanor Higgins	Episode: "Old School Ties"	
2012	Switch	Grace Watkins	Main role (6 episodes)	
2014	A Poet in New York	Liz Reitell		
2014	The Musketeers	Duchess of Savoy	Episode: "The Good Soldier"	
2014	War Book	Kate		
2015	The Woman in Black: Angel of Death	Eve Parkins		
2015	Eye in the Sky	Carrie Gershon		
2015	Life in Squares	Vanessa Bell		
2016	The Hollow Crown: Wars of the Roses	Lady Anne Neville	Episodes: Henry VI, Parts 2 and 3 and Richard III	
2016	NW	Leah Hanwell	BBC Two TV film	
2016	Close to the Enemy	Kathy	BBC2 TV mini-series, written & directed by Stephen Poliakoff, 6 Episodes	
2018	Blue Iguana	Katherine Rookwood		
2019	Curfew	Kaye Newman	Sky One TV series	
2019	The Aeronauts	Antonia		
2019	Intrigo: Samaria	Paula		
2020–2023	The Great	Marial	Nominated - Screen Actors Guild Award for Outstanding Cast in a Comedy Series	
2022	Nobody Listens Anymore	Ruth	Short film	
2025–present	Task	Sara		
2026	War	Serena Byrne	Main cast	

=== Theatre ===
Year	Title	Role	Notes	Ref.
2010	A Month in the Country	Vera Aleksandrovna	Chichester Festival Theatre	
2011	As You Like It	Celia	Rose Theatre, Kingston	
2011	There Is a War	Anne	Royal National Theatre	
2011	The Acid Test	Ruth	Royal Court Theatre	
2011	All the trees of the field in response to Isaiah	Ash	Bush Theatre	
2012	King Lear	Cordelia	Almeida Theatre	
2014	A View from the Bridge	Catherine	Young Vic Nominated - Laurence Olivier Award for Best Actress in a Supporting Role	
2015/2016	A View from the Bridge	Catherine	Lyceum Theatre (Broadway)	
2017	Twelfth Night	Olivia	Royal National Theatre	
2019	Anna	Anna	Royal National Theatre	

=== Radio ===
Year	Title	Role	Notes	Ref.
2015	Fugue State	Polly / Cyclist	BBC Radio 4	
2018	Mythos: Glamis and Albion	Cinderella Parker/Hermione Parker	BBC Radio 4	
2018	The Case of Charles Dexter Ward	Lucy Hawthorne	BBC Radio 4	
2019	The Whisperer in Darkness	Parker	BBC Radio 4	
2020	The Shadow Over Innsmouth	Parker	BBC Radio 4	
2022	Who is Aldrich Kemp?	Clara Page	BBC Radio 4	
2023	Who killed Aldrich Kemp?	Clara Page	BBC Radio 4	
2024	Aldrich Kemp and The Rose of Pamir	Clara Page	BBC Radio 4	

== Selected accolades ==
=== Listicle ===
- Fox was named one of Screen International Stars of Tomorrow in 2011.

=== Awards and nominations ===
Year	Award	Category	Work	Result	Ref
2011	2011 Evening Standard Theatre Awards	Milton Shulman Award for Outstanding Newcomer	As You Like It, The Acid Test, There Is A War	Nominated	
2015	Laurence Olivier Awards	Best Actress in a Supporting Role	A View from the Bridge (Young Vic)	Nominated	
2020	Actor Awards	Outstanding Performance by an Ensemble in a Comedy Series	The Great	Nominated	
2022	Actor Awards	Outstanding Performance by an Ensemble in a Comedy Series	The Great	Nominated	
