= Dungeons & Dragons controversies =

The role-playing game Dungeons & Dragons (D&D), which receives significant attention in the media and in popular culture, has been the subject of numerous controversies. The game sometimes received unfavorable coverage, especially during its early years in the early 1980s. Because the term D&D may be mistakenly used to refer to all types of role-playing games, some controversies regarding D&D mistakenly pertain to role-playing games in general, or to the literary genre of fantasy. Some controversies concern the game and its alleged impact on those who play it, while others concern business issues at the game's original publisher, TSR.

At various times in its history, Dungeons & Dragons has been accused of promoting Satanism, witchcraft, suicide, pornography, and murder. The moral panic about role-playing games peaked in the 1980s. In 2016, The New York Times reported that moral panic over Dungeons & Dragons had subsided.

D&D has been accused of portraying Caucasians, Asians, and Africans in racist ways. This criticism extends to D&D's portrayal of racial stereotypes in some of its "monsters", such as orcs and drow elves. Attempts were made to fix some of these issues in the release of certain D&D 5th edition supplemental rulebooks.

D&D is banned by Wisconsin's Waupun Prison for "promoting gang-related activity", and by the Idaho State Correctional Institution as part of its blanket ban on role-playing games. Some have criticized D&D on religious grounds, including Peter Leithart, George Grant, and William Schnoebelen.

D&D has been involved in some licensing and trademark disputes, and some material had to be changed or excised to comply with intellectual property law. For example, hobbits were renamed "halflings" to avoid copyright issues with J. R. R. Tolkien's Middle-earth.

There were internal disputes at D&D's parent company, TSR Inc. Some of them involved game creators Dave Arneson and Gary Gygax. There was also a dispute between Gygax and business partner Brian Blume.

== Concerns about Satanism and suicide ==
In Dark Dungeons by Jack T. Chick, a girl gets involved in wicca through the "occult training" she receives while playing Dungeons & Dragons. Later she converts to Christianity and rejects the game, burning the materials and avoiding Hell, which is explicitly stated as the destination of all D&D players.

At various times in its history, Dungeons & Dragons (and fantasy role-playing games in general) has been accused of promoting such practices as Satanism, witchcraft, suicide, pornography, and murder. Especially during the 1980s, certain religious groups accused the game of encouraging sorcery and the veneration of demons.

The concept of Dungeons & Dragons as Satanic was linked to concerns about Satanic ritual abuse, in that both presumed the existence of large, organized Satanic cults and societies. Sources such as the Dark Dungeons tract from Chick Publications portray D&D as a recruitment tool for these organizations.

=== Mazes and Monsters ===
As the role-playing game hobby began to grow, it was connected in 1979 of the disappearance of 16-year-old James Dallas Egbert III. Egbert attempted suicide in the utility tunnels beneath the campus of Michigan State University, then went missing for a month. His parents hired private investigator William Dear to find him. Dear discovered that Egbert played Dungeons & Dragons and also heard rumors that students went into the steam tunnels to play a live action version of the game. Dear knew little about the game, and speculated to the press that Egbert had gotten lost in the steam tunnels during one such session. The press largely reported the story as fact, which served as the kernel of a persistent rumor regarding such "steam tunnel incidents". William Dear clarified what he discovered in the 1984 book The Dungeon Master, in which he rejected the link between D&D and Egbert's disappearance. He acknowledged that Egbert's domineering mother and struggles with his sexuality had more to do with his suicide than his interest in role-playing games.

In 1981, Rona Jaffe published Mazes and Monsters, a novel with a plot similar to the Egbert case. The book was adapted into the 1982 made-for-television movie Mazes and Monsters, starring Tom Hanks. In 1983, the Canadian film Skullduggery depicted a role-playing game similar to D&D as tool of the devil to transform a young man into a serial killer. Neal Stephenson's 1984 novel satirizing university life, The Big U, includes a series of similar incidents in which a live-action fantasy role-player dies in a steam tunnel accident.

The publicity surrounding the Mazes and Monsters novel and film heightened the public's unease about role-playing games. But it also increased the sales of D&D game manuals considerably. For example, "sales of the Basic Set rose dramatically. Right before the steam tunnel incident, the Basic Set might have sold 5,000 copies a month. By the end of 1979, it was trading over 30,000 copies per month, and only going up from there".

=== Patricia Pulling and BADD ===
Patricia Pulling was an anti-occult campaigner from Richmond, Virginia, and the founder of Bothered About Dungeons & Dragons (BADD). This one-person advocacy group was dedicated to the elimination of Dungeons & Dragons and other such games. Pulling founded BADD in 1982 after her son Irving died by suicide; she continued her advocacy until her death in 1997. As her son had played D&D, she filed a wrongful death lawsuit against her son's high school principal, holding him responsible for what she claimed was a D&D curse placed upon her son shortly before his death. She later filed suit against TSR, the game's publisher at the time.

The case against TSR was dismissed in 1984, and reporters disproved most of Pulling's claims. In 1990, science fiction and fantasy author Michael A. Stackpole authored The Pulling Report, a review highly critical of Pulling and BADD's methods of data collection, analysis, and reporting. When Pulling's lawsuits were dismissed, she founded BADD and began publishing information to promote her belief that D&D encouraged Satanism, rape, suicide, and many other immoral and illegal practices.

BADD effectively ceased to exist after Pulling died of cancer in 1997.

=== 60 Minutes special ===
In a 1985 segment of 60 Minutes, host Ed Bradley said: "[Dungeons & Dragons] has become popular with children anywhere from grammar school on up. Not so with a lot of adults, who think it's been connected to a number of suicides and murders." It featured interviews with Gary Gygax, co-creator of Dungeons & Dragons; Thomas Radecki, president of the National Coalition on TV Violence; and Pulling, whose child died by suicide. It also included interviews with parents of players of the game, who had allegedly murdered people and died by suicide in connection with the game. Radecki linked the game to 28 murders and suicides. In response, Gygax said: "This is make-believe. No one is martyred, there is no violence there. To use an analogy with another game, who is bankrupted by a game of Monopoly? Nobody is. The money isn't real. There is no link, except perhaps in the mind of those people who are looking desperately for any other cause than their own failures as a parent".

=== Lieth Von Stein ===
A 1988 murder case in Washington, North Carolina, brought Dungeons & Dragons more unfavorable publicity, because members of a Dungeons & Dragons gaming group were involved. Chris Pritchard, a student at North Carolina State University, allegedly masterminded the murder of his stepfather, Lieth Von Stein, for his $2 million fortune. A masked assailant bludgeoned and stabbed Von Stein and his wife, Bonnie (Pritchard's mother), in their bedroom, leaving the husband fatally wounded and the wife gravely injured.

Pritchard had a history of mutual antagonism with Von Stein, and investigators learned that Pritchard had become involved with drugs and alcohol while attending NCSU. But the authorities focused on his role-playing group after a game map depicting the Von Stein house turned up as physical evidence. Pritchard's friends Neal Henderson and James Upchurch were implicated in a plot to help Pritchard kill Von Stein. All three men went to state prison in 1990. Henderson and Pritchard have since been paroled. Upchurch's death sentence was commuted to life in 1992; he is serving his term.

True crime authors Joe McGinniss and Jerry Bledsoe played up the role-playing angle. Much attention was given to Upchurch's influence and power as a Dungeon Master. Bledsoe's book, Blood Games, was made into a TV movie, Honor Thy Mother, in 1992. The same year, McGinniss's book was adapted into a two-part TV miniseries, Cruel Doubt, directed by Yves Simoneau. Both television films depicted Dungeons & Dragons handbooks with artwork doctored to imply that they had inspired the murder.

=== TSR removes Satanic monsters ===
The controversy over the game created a boost in sales, from $2.3 million in 1979 to $8.7 million by the end of 1980, but also led TSR to remove references to demons, devils, and other potentially controversial supernatural monsters from the 2nd Edition of AD&D published in 1989. Devils and demons were renamed baatezu and tanar'ri, respectively, and "they were often referred to as fiends within the text, but the 'D' words were never uttered for years within the game, even though many fans still referred to them by their original names at their own tables. The descriptions of each race focused more on the extra-dimensional aspect of their existence [...] The conflict between the two races (known as the Blood War) also became the focus of their actions, which overtook the seduction of mortals".

The moral panic around role-playing games peaked in the 1980s. A 2005 study highlighted that after 1992, it could not find "any letters, articles or editorials on the topic except for several retrospective examinations of the history of gaming between 1997 and 2000 and an article dealing with prejudice against Christians from within the gaming community in [Dungeon, Dragon, Breakout, Critical miss and Places to go People to Be] in 1999".

=== Wizards of the Coast relaxes restrictions ===
In 1997, Wizards of the Coast purchased TSR. In the late 1990s, Wizards of the Coast started to reintroduce terminology in the 2nd Edition that TSR had removed. This shift was seen in books such as A Paladin in Hell (1998) and Guide to Hell (1999). Wizards of the Coast president Peter Adkison directed Monte Cook to start the reintroduction. "Cook was very happy to bring demons and devils back. He felt that their removal had just been 'lip service' to the people who had complained, that if they picked up a Monster Manual and saw a gargoyle, they'd still think that the game had demons". These later supplements used both styles of terminology interchangeably as the bowdlerized names themselves had been part of the Dungeons & Dragons "mythology for almost a decade". The Guide to Hell added an in-universe explanation on the differing terminology: "Devils are by nature deceptive. One of the most common ways in which they muddy the waters of scholarship is by the use of several different names".

In 2000, the 3rd Edition of the game was released and addressed demonology far more explicitly than materials from previous editions, but relations and interactions with these creatures are explicitly said to be evil. The "fervor surrounding Dungeons & Dragons had died down, which meant that the third edition of the game could experiment with new kinds of content without fear of controversy".

=== Rulebooks with mature audience label ===
In 2002 and 2003, Wizards of the Coast released two books with a mature audience label: the Book of Vile Darkness (2002) and the Book of Exalted Deeds (2003).

The Book of Vile Darkness added "rules for things like alcohol and drug addiction, cannibalism, mutilation, sacrifice, and sexual fetishes. [...] There are some elements of the Book of Vile Darkness that haven't aged well, with some players objecting to the idea that all drug use or interest in sadomasochism makes a person inherently evil, but the content in the book was unlike anything that had been seen in print up until that point". Dragonlance co-creator Tracy Hickman said the book was "cheap, trashy and demeaning" and that "every dark fear that mothers and clergy across America have about D&D is now, suddenly, true".

The Book of Exalted Deeds was the flip side of the Book of Vile Darkness and dealt with "the extreme elements of the good alignment". It included "ethical questions that most players might not be comfortable with including in their game" and "also dealt with aspects of real-world religion and tried to use them in the context of Dungeons & Dragons, such as stigmata".

=== End of the panic ===
In 2016, The New York Times reported that moral panic over Dungeons & Dragons had subsided as "parental anxieties have turned to videos, notably those dripping with gore", with heightened concerns about video games. Radley Balko, for The Washington Post, highlighted the connection to the larger Satanic panic that began in the 1970s, writing: "The direct consequences of this particular moral panic weren't as severe as some others. It mostly involved efforts to ban the game and, of course, led to ostracizing the kids who played it. [...] [The] larger trend did have some pretty devastating fallout, particularly within the criminal justice system".

The moral panic over Dungeons & Dragons served as a plot element for the fourth season of Stranger Things set in the mid-1980s, in which portions of a town's population come to believe unusual deaths are caused by the local school's D&D club and its perceived connection to satanic rituals.

=== Research on gaming and suicide ===
The American Association of Suicidology, the U.S. Centers for Disease Control and Prevention, and Health and Welfare Canada all concluded that there is no causal link between fantasy gaming and suicide.

Researchers outside the context of BADD have investigated the emotional impact of Dungeons & Dragons since the 1980s. Studies have shown that depression and suicidal tendencies are not typically associated with role players. Feelings of alienation are not associated with mainstream players, though those who are deeply, and often financially, committed to the game do tend to have these feelings. According to one study, there is "no significant correlation between years of playing the game and emotional stability."

When the American Association of Suicidology, the Centers for Disease Control, and the National Safety Council (among others) investigated "the levels of suicide amongst RPG players [...] in relation to national statistics on youth suicide in Canada and the United States [...], it was found that while overall level of youth suicide (15-25) was 5300 per year, there had only been 128 suicide attempts by game players recorded by B.A.D.D and affiliated organizations between 1979 and 1988. Furthermore, most of these claimed suicides were simply accumulated unsourced newspaper clippings, often referring to the same incident several times over. According to the estimated number of RPG gamers in the country at the time, there should have been at least 1060 gamer suicides in the same period. Consequently, the finding of the report was that suicide amongst RPG gamers was actually significantly lower than national averages for the age demographic of 15-25 year olds".

One 2015 study has suggested that psychiatrists do not associate role-playing games such as Dungeons & Dragons with poor mental health.

== Cultural representations and racism ==
=== Humans ===
==== Lack of racial diversity ====
In the early editions of Dungeons & Dragons, humans "were coded as culturally White and depicted as racially so in illustrations in game manuals"; "of the hundreds of illustrations depicting adventurers in the first edition and second edition Player's Handbook and Dungeon Master's Guide, there were no nonwhite adventurers". The "Eurocentric focus has its roots in the source material, specifically Tolkien's work". Supplements depicting non-Anglo-Saxon-influenced cultures, such as Oriental Adventures (1985), Maztica Campaign Set (1991), Al-Qadim: Arabian Adventures (1992), and The Jungles of Chult (1993), were added to the game over time; however, critics have noted that many of these depictions use problematic tropes of ethnic groups.

==== Asians ====
At the time of its release, Oriental Adventures was a best-seller. Since then, fans and designers have criticized its representation of Asian culture. Aaron Trammell, in the academic journal Analog Game Studies, stated that the book uses orientalism: "a way of reducing the complexity of eastern culture to a set of problematically racist and sexist stereotypes". He specifically highlighted the addition of new comeliness and honor ability scores which place a focus on Asian appearance and social worth – "both comeliness and honor show how Gygax's appreciation for eastern culture is articulated through a set of game mechanics that both quantify this culture and compare it to the invisible and assumed dynamics of Western American culture". Trammell opined that "at its most problematic, Oriental Adventures represents a complex and multifaceted set of cultural interests through a single and singular set of game mechanics". Game designer Daniel Kwan highlighted that the depictions of Asians in the supplement are "violent and savage, uncivilized and in need of foreign saviors and as objects of fetishization". The campaign setting book Kara-Tur: The Eastern Realms (1988) expanded a five-page description on "four empires: Shou Lung (Imperial China), T'u Lung (warring China), Wa (Tokugawa Japan), and Kozakura (Sengoku Japan)" from Oriental Adventures and added a new continent to the Forgotten Realms. While Ed Greenwood's original Forgotten Realms did not map one-to-one to real-world cultures, as the setting was expanded by other authors, real-world cultures were used as a touchstone. "Technically, this practice started with the Celtic-influenced culture of the Moonshae Islands, but Kara-Tur was the first big expansion in this direction".

==== Africans ====
Ed Greenwood introduced Chult, a pan-Africa-inspired location in the Forgotten Realms, in the Forgotten Realms Campaign Set (1987). It served the main setting for the fifth Harpers novel The Ring of Winter (1992) by James Lowder. Lowder was then contracted to expand Chult into a full setting book, which became The Jungles of Chult (1993). He wrote the product's sourcebook section. The adventure "The Heart of the Jungle" was written by Jean Rabe. For his section of the work, Lowder pulled from his notes from working on The Ring of Winter along with other sources, "including articles on 'The Dark Continent' by David Howery and 'Arms & Armors of Africa' by Michael J. Varhola, both in Dragon #189 (January 1993)", and listed "the Allan Quartermain tales (1885–1927) of H. Rider Haggard and the Professor Challenger stories (1912–1929) of Arthur Conan Doyle" as "pulp inspirations". Cecilia D'Anastasio, for Kotaku, wrote that the campaign setting "has been written off as tone-deaf". She criticizes "The Dark Continent" article for describing human inhabitants as "dark-skinned with tightly curled hair, while its other races include pygmies and 'bushmen.' In this setting, slaver caravans raid tribal villages, which survive on subsistence agriculture and hunting. A minutely-researched six pages detailing African weaponry followed, citing eight anthropological or historical texts". Chult's major city, Mezro, is described in this 2nd Edition book as a rival to "some of the most 'civilized' population centers in Faerun". By the 4th Edition, Chult was struck with disaster: "human civilization is virtually nonexistent here, though an Amnian colony and a port sponsored by Baldur's Gate cling to the northern coasts, and a few tribes—some noble savages, others depraved cannibals—roam the interior".

Tomb of Annihilation (2017), an adventure module for D&D 5th edition, was criticized by both Paste and Kotaku for its depiction of Chult. Cameron Kunzelman, for Paste, wrote that "the jungles and dangers also have a slight feel of 'darkest Africa' to them, and the Chultan people are dark-skinned", and highlighted "places like the design of the Batiri, a culture of goblins who wear massive tribal masks and literally stack on top of each other to make a 'totem pole' for warfare". For Kotaku, D'Anastasio wrote: "while many players I talked to enjoyed how the history and political structures of Chult were expanded in Tomb of Annihilation, they were still unimpressed by its execution. Its setting is an amalgamation of African cultures, a trope frequent in 20th-century media that flattens the dimensionality of human experiences on the continent, which contains hundreds of ethnic groups".

=== Humanoids and monsters ===
The non-D&D book Fundamentals of Game Design (2013) states: "in RPGs, race refers to groups of real and fantasy humanoids such as humans, dwarves, elves, giants, and so on. A better term would be species, but race is the term established by convention". Jess Kung, on NPR's Code Switch, and Christopher Thomas, for PBS NewsHour, highlighted that Gary Gygax "was a self-described biological determinist", which influenced D&D's design. Steven Dashiell, for Scientific American, explained that a table "in the first edition of the Advanced Dungeons & Dragons game that dictated which demihuman cultures would get along easily or have a natural dislike" is "most often cited element of biological determinism in the early game". Level caps for non-humans and demihumans in early Dungeons & Dragons meant these "characters could never achieve the same degree of growth as human characters". Chris Van Dyke, in Race in Dungeons & Dragons, wrote: "humans are the normative race, and given the Anglo-centric depiction of human culture in the game, humans can be interpreted as representing 'white people.' They are 'normal', while all other races, whether good or evil, are to some extent 'exotic,' and otherized".

Historically, some races in Dungeons & Dragons have been depicted as automatically evil, and according to one critic, they have been described with "language used to denigrate non-white peoples of the real world, specifically those of Asian or Black ethnicity". Another critic writes that any portrayal of a fictional race or a "group of intelligent people as inherently evil feeds into the notion of harmful stereotypes". Matthew Gault, for Wired, highlighted the issue as "complicated and fraught. It's tied into a history of racial stereotypes and nerd power fantasies". In the academic journal Mythlore, Steven Holmes commented some fantasy races, such as the drow, were originally intended to be "perfect villains—endpoints on a divide of good and evil" and that villains as originally presented by Gygax were "evil without redemption, justifying any and all acts of violence against them". He thought it was important to view this as part of an author using "negative estrangement" within a narrative and "recognizing that fantasy races, particularly villains, are constructed as hybrids of often racist stereotypes does not therefore excuse or condemn the authors who use such stylings. [...] The process of negative estrangement is inextricably linked to the construction of monstrousness itself, and the role of the monster in narrative as the 'more evil' antagonist to amplify the protagonists' heroism".

Dashiell commented that "components of essentialism" have been "reconsidered" in subsequent editions Dungeons & Dragons – "level limitations for different racial groups were removed along with gaming stat limitations on nonhuman species, providing different systems to explain their advantages and disadvantages. Wizards of the Coast has reworked the game's system of morality, called alignment, in recent editions, and eliminated the concept of evil races". In 2022, academic Christopher Ferguson conducted a survey study of 308 adults (38.2% non-White, and 17% Dungeons and Dragons players) and found that the game "was not associated with greater ethnocentrism (one facet of racism) attitudes". Ferguson concluded that Wizards of the Coast may be responding to a moral panic like that surrounding Satanism in the 1980s. Holmes thought Ferguson's study reflected "the willingness of audiences to allow artistic license in fantasy representations"; however, Holmes commented that "even if we accept the artistic license of artists trying to create 'more evil' villains for the triumphant heroes, the overall cognitive effect of such depictions is still the normalization of white bodies and the othering of non-white bodies because the normalized body becomes the reference point to evaluate other bodies".

==== Orcs ====
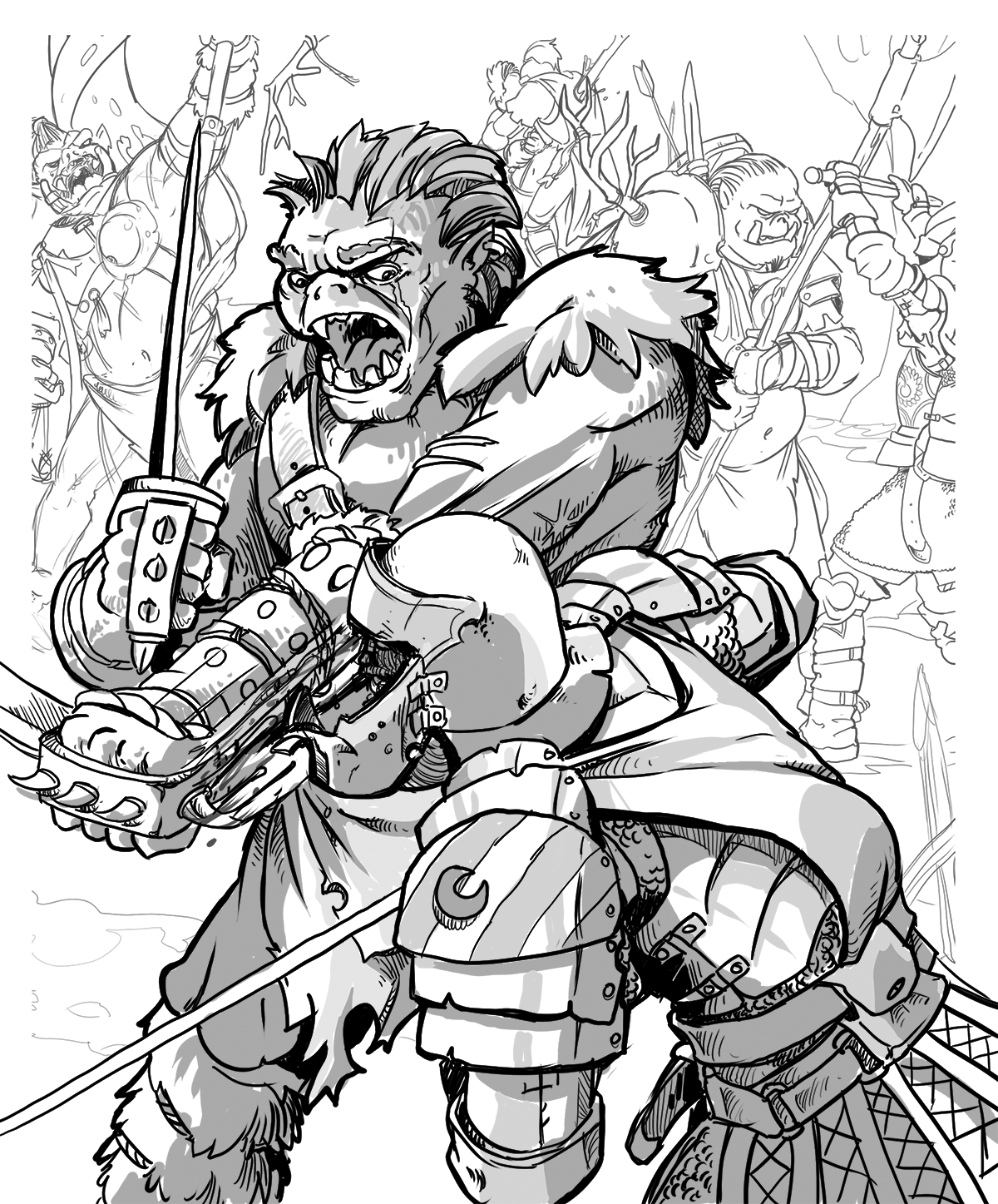
Orcs were popularized by fantasy author J. R. R. Tolkien and are found in many fantasy games.

The modern depiction of orcs originates with J.R.R. Tolkien's Lord of the Rings, which depicts them as "deranged and repulsive versions" of Mongol stereotypes and "inherently evil humanoid creatures". Holmes commented that "Tolkien's work, both literary and non-fiction, remains seminal in critical understandings of depictions of the monster". The depictions of orcs in Dungeons & Dragons (1974) and Advanced Dungeons & Dragons (1977) were the first major appearances of orcs outside Tolkien's work. Helen Young, an Australian academic, highlighted that the descriptions of orc bodies "resonate with anti-Black racist stereotypes" and a "comparison to animals, particularly pigs, is common in almost all editions of D&D up to the present. [...] That orc bodies are violent and belligerent is iterated and re-iterated with each issue of a new edition of D&D rules". Chris Sims, in the 4th Edition book Wizards Presents: Races and Classes (2007), wrote, "where dwarves gather and build, orcs scavenge and destroy, and where dwarves are dutiful and industrious, orcs are treacherous and lazy".

Some view orcs as a representation of the Other, "a philosophical concept used to paint entire cultures as being somehow inferior or evil because they were different". Christian Hoffer of ComicBook.com wrote "additionally, deciding that orcs are inherently less intelligent than other races also touches upon harmful topics of eugenics and the belief that some people are less intelligent solely due to their genetics". In The Tropes of Fantasy Fiction, Gabrielle Lissauer writes that the Eberron campaign setting subverts the classical racial presentation of orcs as savages. Instead, Lissauer writes, "these orcs are interested in peace and keeping the world safe. [...]. They just want to live in harmony with nature".

The notion of orcs as a racist trope is controversial. The Germanic studies scholar Sandra Ballif Straubhaar argues against the "recurring accusations" of racism in Tolkien's Middle-earth, writing, "a polycultured, polylingual world is absolutely central" to the Middle-earth setting of Lord of the Rings, and that readers and filmgoers will easily see that. Ferguson's 2022 study reported that "only 10.2% found a depiction of orc monsters as inherently evil to be offensive". Holmes highlighted that "34% of respondents" in Ferguson's study "found the same depiction as 'racist'" and posited that Ferguson potentially demonstrated that "while audiences may accept that on its face a depiction of a race as inherently evil may be racist, they may not find it 'offensively' racist in the larger context of its purpose" where monsters "serve as a foil for the heroism of the protagonists".

==== Drow elves ====
Drow are an evil, murderous, dark-skinned subrace of elves first mentioned in the 1st Edition Monster Manual (1977). The drow Drizzt Do'Urden, the most famous Dungeons & Dragons character, "is commonly presented as the one exception: a hero who overcame his evil culture to become a good person". In Wizards Presents: Races and Classes (2007), James Wyatt writes that "Drizzt Do'Urden is a compelling hero because of the evil society he grew up in, the fear and prejudice he faces on the surface world, and the hatred the other drow of Menzoberranzan still hold for him". Some critics have highlighted that the drow are connected to the "racist idea that non-white people are inherently bad". In the book Dungeons and Dragons and Philosophy, James Rocha writes that the difference between drow and dark elves in the Forgotten Realms setting is rooted in racist stereotypes: "an acceptable lighter-skinned dark race side by side with only the most rare exceptions in the darker race, which is thought to be inherently evil, mirrors American history in a very uncomfortable fashion". Rocha adds that descriptions of wood elves and sun elves in the Forgotten Realms resemble stereotypes of Native Americans and Asians, respectively, and dwarves in Greyhawk "seem to have traits that anti-Semites associate with the Jewish people". Holmes highlighted the inconsistent artistic portrayal over time as "the black skin of the drow is not" consistently used across all products – this meant that when "some saw the drow as a fantastical race of spider-themed elves, others saw them as one of the very few depictions of black-skinned people in Dungeons & Dragons" and the inconsistent "visual representation" then "further compounds the complexity of discussing the relationship of the drow to real world race, given that some players may see the drow as obviously modeled on real world black bodies, and others seeing them as a fantasy race with no realworld analogue".

On June 26, 2020, Netflix and Hulu removed the Advanced Dungeons & Dragons episode of the television series Community from their platforms due to scenes with Chang playing a dark elf by wearing elf ears and makeup resembling blackface. A statement from Sony Pictures Television said that the studio supported the decision to remove the episode.

=== Attempts to address racial issues in D&D 5th edition ===
In March 2020, Christian Hoffer, for ComicBook.com, highlighted that Explorer's Guide to Wildemount reuses the Orc race stats from Eberron: Rising From the Last War rather than the stats originally published in Volo's Guide to Monsters. Some of the differences include not having an intelligence stat penalty and the "Menacing" trait. Hoffer wrote that the book "takes an important step in specifying that no race of intelligent creatures in [sic] inherently evil, nor are they inherently less smart than other races. While many still see the idea of 'race' in Dungeons & Dragons as problematic, Explorer's Guide to Wildemount at least removes one of the most problematic aspects of that part of D&D". In June 2020, Polygon reported that "the D&D team announced that it would be making changes to portions of its 5th edition product line that fans have called out for being insensitive. That includes racist portrayals of a people known as the Vistani, an in-fiction analog for the Romani people. The company will also be making a substantive change to character creation to broaden the permissible spectrum of character types within each of the game's many races". In its official statement, the D&D Team wrote: "throughout the 50-year history of D&D, some of the peoples in the game—orcs and drow being two of the prime examples—have been characterized as monstrous and evil, using descriptions that are painfully reminiscent of how real-world ethnic groups have been and continue to be denigrated. That's just not right, and it's not something we believe in. Despite our conscious efforts to the contrary, we have allowed some of those old descriptions to reappear in the game".

In July 2020, Wizards of the Coast added a sensitivity disclaimer to some legacy products that are on sale digitally. Many of these products feature cultures inspired by Asia, Mesoamerica and the Middle East. Sebastian Modak reported for The Washington Post that the tabletop community has widely approved these changes. Modak wrote: "in its statement addressing mistakes around portrayals of different peoples in the D&D universe, Wizards of the Coast highlighted its recent efforts in bringing in more diverse voices to craft the new D&D source books coming out in 2021. But in a widely circulated statement, Orion D. Black, a narrative designer who was contracted by Wizards of the Coast for seven months, described a workplace where they felt tokenized and neglected. [...] These conversations—around depictions of race and alleged treatment of employees of marginalized backgrounds and identities—have encouraged players to seek out other tabletop roleplaying experiences". In December 2020, Matthew Gault, for Wired, reported favorably on the roundtable discussions Wizards of the Coast has hosted with fans and community leaders on diversity and inclusion. But he also highlighted that other efforts, such as revisions to old material and the release of new material, have been less great and at times minimal. Gault wrote: "WotC appears to be trying to change things, but it keeps stumbling, and it's often the fans who pick up the pieces. Reddit and other online forums contain dozens of revisions [...]. WotC is trying to make changes, but it often feels like lip service. [...] The loudest voices criticizing D&D right now are doing it out of love. They don't want to see it destroyed, they want it to change with the times".

==== Tasha's Cauldron of Everything ====
In November 2020, Wizards of the Coast published a new sourcebook, Tasha's Cauldron of Everything, that includes new optional character creation rules, including updated racial rules. Lead rules designer Jeremy Crawford said of the changes to racial ability score bonuses: "Contrary to what many people might think, those ability score increases that are in those different options—they're not there for game balance purposes. They are there strictly to reinforce the different archetypes that have been in D&D going all the way back to the '70s. [...] It really has been just about archetype reinforcement". Io9 highlighted that "this broadening of the abilities and ideals in character creation—that have, so far, explicitly linked to racial stereotypes—is the first step in Wizards of the Coast's recently revealed plans to address issues of race and inclusivity within Dungeons & Dragons. [...] For Crawford, it's not just about addressing previously longheld bias and privileges in races of the game [...] but also giving players the freedom to pick whatever race they want while creating a character that doesn't feel like a specific exemplar of that race".

Charlie Hall, for Polygon, highlighted his disappointment with optional racial rules in Tasha's Cauldron of Everything. He wrote: "Earlier this year the publisher admitted that it had made missteps involving its portrayal of race in the past, and vowed to make changes to the structure of D&D to make it more welcoming and more flexible. Those changes, as detailed in Tasha's Cauldron, are extremely weak. The guidance is, more or less, to ignore the rules for character creation and just do what feels right. [...] It falls well short of establishing a progressive new precedent for the original role-playing game". Of the origin of customization in Tasha's Cauldron of Everything, Liam Nolan wrote for CBR: "one of the biggest controversies surrounding Dungeons & Dragons has been the game's prescriptivist approach to race and the way it embraces problematic stereotypes. [...] While customized origins do not undo any of the damage that's been done, they do provide a path forward for making Dungeons & Dragons more accessible and less problematic". Corey Plante, for Inverse, also highlighted the customization options in Tasha's Cauldron of Everything, writing: "to an extent, this kind of flexibility could jeopardize the core identity of the game's races and classes. [...] Traditionalists might frown upon these rules if their loyalties lie with previous editions and their more rigid game structures. But a major factor in D&D's exploding popularity over the last several years has to do with the 5th edition, the loosest and most accessible version of the game ever made. [...] These kinds of creative innovations aimed at diversity and inclusion might alienate the game's traditionalists, but it's totally awesome to imagine what players might concoct".

==== Cultural consultants ====
On September 2, 2022, Wizards of the Coast issued an apology for offensive material in Spelljammer: Adventures in Space. This content was removed from digital editions and will be removed from future print editions; errata were also released. Charlie Hall, for Polygon, wrote that this "apology is in reference to a race called the hadozee [...] The primatelike creatures were called out for their association with in-fiction slavery, as well as problematic themes and images that together serve to reinforce racism against Black people". Both Hall and Christian Hoffer of ComicBook.com highlighted that no cultural or sensitivity consultant was listed in the product's credits.

Following the announced revisions to Spelljammer: Adventures in Space, Wizards' game design architect Christopher Perkins announced a new inclusion review process for the Dungeons & Dragons studio that will require "every word, illustration, and map" to be reviewed at several steps in development "by multiple outside cultural consultants prior to publication". The previous process included cultural consultants only at the discretion of the product lead for a project. All products being reprinted will also go through this review process and be updated as needed. For Dicebreaker, Chase Carter commented that Perkins's announcement seemed "hopeful" that the new review process would remove "the onus of flagging obvious misses from the playerbase". Carter also wrote that it is "unclear whether these consultants will be considered freelancers, contracted workers or something more permanent within Wizards' development structure"; the announcement also did not "explicitly state" if the cultural consultants would be included in product credits; "this has often not been the case for past books, adventures and other supplements".

==== Terminology update ====
In December 2022, Wizards of the Coast announced that the word "race" would no longer be used to refer to a character's biological traits, to be replaced by the word "species"; this change went into effect with the December One D&D playtest release. The press release stated that "'race' is a problematic term that has had prejudiced links between real world people and the fantasy peoples of D&D worlds" and that terminology change was made with the consultation of "multiple outside cultural consultants". Following the release of the 2024 revision to the 5th Edition ruleset, Marc Tracy of The New York Times commented that the change in terminology has "exposed a rift among Dungeons & Dragons players" and become "part of the broader cultural debate about how to balance principles like inclusivity and accessibility with history and tradition". He noted that "the popularity of the new rules will ultimately be determined at Dungeons & Dragons sessions" by the players. Tracy explained that the updates "may fit into the corporate world's pursuit of diversity, equity and inclusion, but they are also part of a financial strategy for Wizards of the Coast".

== Objections by groups ==
=== Prisons ===
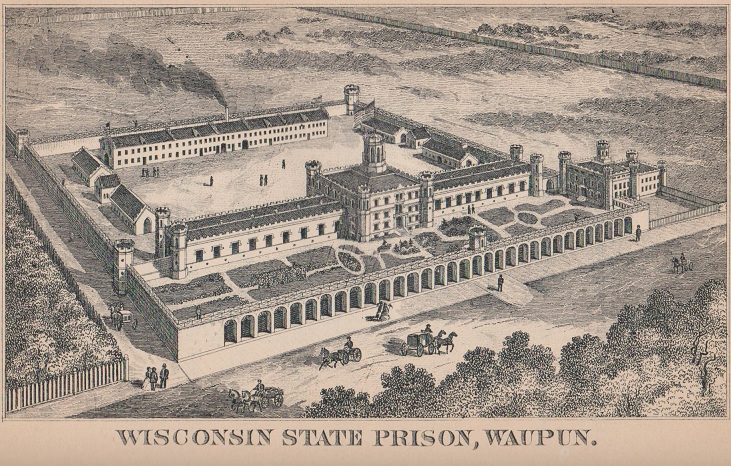
Waupun State Prison in 1895

In 2004, Wisconsin's Waupun Prison instituted a ban on playing Dungeons & Dragons, arguing that it promoted gang-related activity. The policy went into effect based on an anonymous letter from an inmate saying that four prisoners who played the game were forming a "gang". When the ban took effect, the prison confiscated all D&D-related materials. Inmate Kevin T. Singer, a dedicated player of the game, sentenced to a life term for first-degree homicide, sought to overturn the ban, saying it violated his First Amendment rights. On January 25, 2010, the U.S. 7th Circuit Court of Appeals upheld the ban as a "reasonable policy".

Other prisons, such as the Idaho State Correctional Institution, have a blanket ban on role-playing games. But not all prisons ban Dungeons & Dragons. Some prisons ban components of the game under other policies: for example, banning dice to reduce gambling. As a result, "prison players have come up with a variety of ingenious ways to make rolls—everything from making the illicit dice themselves to designing intricate spinners out of batteries and paperclips". According to The New York Times Magazine, playing Dungeons & Dragons in prison is more difficult than elsewhere, because:

Players can't just look up the game rules online. The hard-bound manuals that detail settings, characters and spells are expensive and can be difficult to get past mailroom censors. Some states ban books about the game altogether, while others prohibit anything with a hard cover. Books with maps are generally forbidden, and dice are often considered contraband.

At prisons where the game is permitted, players often have to craft game "materials like miniatures, maps, and character sheets" out of permitted items. "Benign as these materials may seem to anyone familiar with tabletop gaming, many inmates will tell you it's not uncommon for correctional officers to mistake their gaming materials for something more nefarious". Melvin Woolley-Bey, incarcerated at Sterling Correctional Facility, said, "a lieutenant took an active interest in breaking up our game, taking our pieces and sending out maps to the board to make sure they weren't escape plans".

=== Religious objections ===
In 1987 two pastors, Peter Leithart and George Grant, published a book, The Catechism of the New Age: A Response to Dungeons and Dragons. Joseph P. Laycock wrote that their book condemned role-playing as allowing too much freedom, which the authors regard as a gateway to critical thinking, which in turn may result in heretical thought.

In 1989, William Schnoebelen, a Christian author who has said he is a former Wiccan and Satanic priest, wrote an article, "Straight Talk on Dungeons and Dragons", that was published by Chick Publications. The article summarized D&D as "a feeding program for occultism and witchcraft. [...] Dungeons and Dragons violates the commandment of I Ths. 5:22 'Abstain from all appearance of evil.'" It said that rituals described in the game were capable of conjuring malevolent demons and producing other real-world effects. It accused the Dungeon Master's Guide of celebrating Adolf Hitler for his charisma. In 2001, Schoebelen wrote a follow-up, "Should a Christian Play Dungeons & Dragons?" These essays portray Dungeons & Dragons as a tool for New Age Satanic groups to introduce concepts and behaviors seen as contrary to "Christian teaching and morality". Schnoebelen wrote in 2006: "In the late 1970s, a couple of the game writers actually came to my wife and I as prominent 'sorcerers' in the community. They wanted to make certain the rituals were authentic. For the most part, they are." This article focused on contrasting the Christian worldview and the fantasy worldview of D&D. He wrote, "being exposed to all these ideas of magic to the degree that the game requires cannot but help have a significant impact on the minds of its players."

== Business disputes at TSR ==
=== Dave Arneson ===
The commercial success of Dungeons & Dragons led to lawsuits in 1979, and again in 1985, about the distribution of royalty payments between Dungeons & Dragons co-creators Dave Arneson and Gary Gygax. Specifically at issue were the royalties for AD&D, a product for which TSR did not acknowledge Arneson's intellectual property claims. Those suits were settled out of court by 1981. "In Dragon magazine editorials, Gygax began writing Arneson out of the history of D&D—at least as anything other than a guy with some good ideas", and started to call Arneson's Blackmoor game an "amended Chainmail fantasy campaign". In 1997, Peter Adkison paid Arneson an undisclosed sum to free up Dungeons & Dragons from royalties owed to Arneson; this allowed Wizards of the Coast to retitle Advanced Dungeons & Dragons simply Dungeons & Dragons. In 2004, Arneson said of Gygax: "We see each other at conventions. He does his thing and I do mine. There's no stabbing each other in the back".

=== The Blume brothers ===
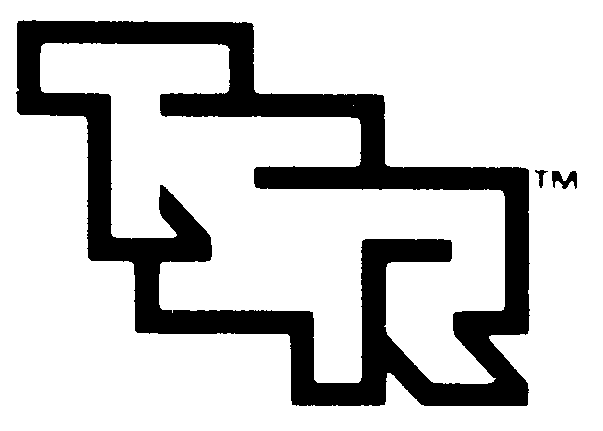
TSR, Inc. logo

In the early 1980s, Gygax became embroiled in a political struggle for control of TSR and disputes related to the company's deteriorating financial situation.

After the July 1975 death of D&D co-founder Don Kaye, Gygax and Brian Blume reorganized their company from a partnership to a corporation called TSR Hobbies. Gygax owned 150 shares, Blume owned the other 100 shares, and both had the option to buy up to 700 shares at any time in the future. But TSR Hobbies had nothing to publish—Dungeons & Dragons was still owned by the three-way partnership between Gygax, Blume and Donna Kaye, the wife of Don—and neither Gygax nor Blume had the money to buy out her shares.

Blume persuaded a reluctant Gygax to allow his father, Melvin Blume, to buy Donna's shares, and those were converted to 200 shares in TSR Hobbies. In addition, Brian bought another 140 shares. These purchases reduced Gygax from the majority shareholder in control of the company to minority shareholder; he effectively became the Blumes' employee. Then in 1980, Brian Blume persuaded Gygax to allow Brian's brother Kevin to purchase Melvin Blume's shares. This gave the Blume brothers a controlling interest, and by 1981, Gygax and the Blumes were increasingly at loggerheads over management of the company.

In 1982, in keeping with the recommendations of the American Management Association, TSR Hobbies added three "outside" directors to the board in addition to Gygax and the Blume brothers. The following year, the Blumes decided to divide TSR Hobbies into two entities. Kevin Blume became president of TSR Inc., and Gygax was made president of TSR Entertainment. The Blumes sent him to Hollywood to develop TV and movie opportunities. By 1984, although TSR Inc. was the games industry leader, grossing $30 million, it was barely breaking even and had debts of $1.5 million. The Blumes began to look for someone to buy the company. When Gygax heard that TSR was being shopped around, he returned to Lake Geneva. After some investigation of the company finances, Gygax charged that the financial crisis was due to mismanagement by Kevin Blume: excess inventory, overstaffing, too many company cars, and some questionable (and expensive) projects such as dredging up a 19th-century shipwreck.

Gygax persuaded the three outside directors to remove Kevin Blume as president for financial mismanagement. The final vote was 4–1, with Brian Blume abstaining. But the outside directors still believed the company's financial problems were terminal and that TSR needed to be sold. In an effort to prevent this, in March 1985, Gygax exercised his 700-share stock option, giving him 850 shares and majority control. He appointed himself president and CEO, and to bring some financial stability to TSR, he hired a company manager, Lorraine Williams, who dismissed the three outside directors.

Bringing Williams on board backfired for Gygax when Brian Blume revealed in October 1985 that he had triggered his own 560-share option and sold all of his and his brother's shares to Williams, giving her just over 1,000 shares and making her the majority shareholder. Gygax took TSR to court in a bid to block the Blumes' sale of their shares to Williams, but he lost, and Williams replaced Gygax as president and CEO. Williams made clear that Gygax would make no further creative contributions to TSR, and several of his projects were immediately shelved and never published.

Sales of D&D reached $29 million in 1985, but Gygax, seeing his future at TSR as untenable, resigned all positions with TSR in October 1986, and settled his disputes with TSR in December 1986. By the terms of his settlement with TSR, Gygax kept the rights to Gord the Rogue as well as all D&D characters whose names were anagrams or plays on his own name (for example, Yrag and Zagyg), but he lost the rights to all his other work, including the World of Greyhawk and the names of all the characters he had ever used in TSR material, such as Mordenkainen, Robilar, and Tenser.

After Wizards of the Coast purchased TSR in 1997, Gygax wrote the preface to the 1998 adventure Return to the Tomb of Horrors, a paean to Gygax's original AD&D adventure Tomb of Horrors. He also returned to the pages of Dragon Magazine, writing the "Up on a Soapbox" column from Issue #268 (January 2000) to Issue #320 (June 2004).

== Licensing and trademark disputes ==
=== Tolkien ===
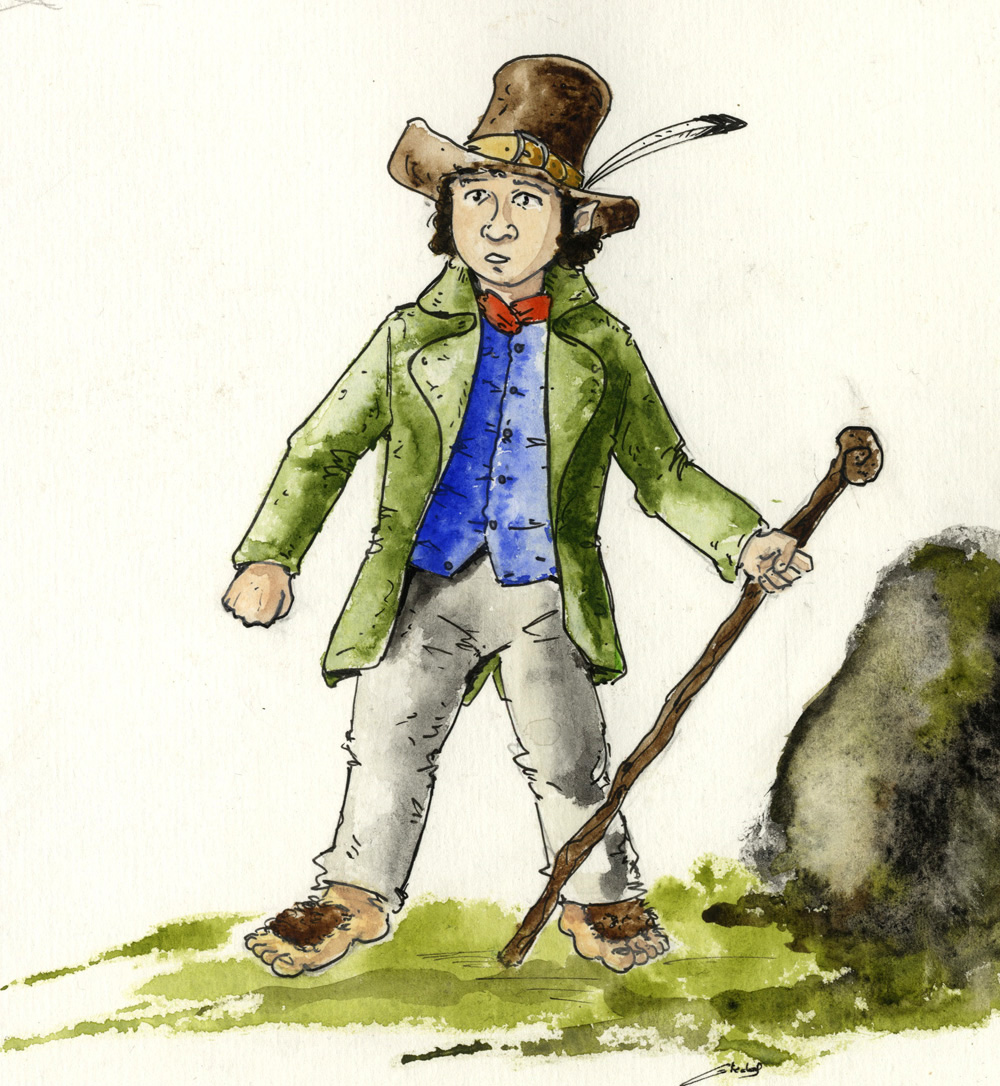
Fan art depicting a hobbit

References in early TSR publications to some creatures from J. R. R. Tolkien's mythical Middle-earth were removed or altered due to intellectual property concerns. For example, TSR replaced all references to the character race of hobbits with the name halflings—which was coined by Tolkien but judged by TSR to be non-infringing. In the first edition of Dungeons & Dragons, the threat of copyright action from Tolkien Enterprises prompted the name changes of hobbit to "halfling", ent to "treant", and balrog to "Type VI demon [balor]".

=== Deities & Demigods ===
TSR ran afoul of intellectual property law regarding the Cthulhu Mythos and Melnibonéan Mythos, elements of which were included in early versions of the 1980 Deities & Demigods manual. These problems were resolved by excising the material from later editions of the book.

=== Digital piracy ===
On April 6, 2009, Wizards of the Coast suspended all sales of its products for the Dungeons & Dragons games in PDF format from places such as OneBookShelf and its subsidiaries RPGNow.com and DriveThruRPG. This coincided with a lawsuit brought against eight people in an attempt to prevent future copyright infringement of their books, and included the 4th Edition Dungeons & Dragons products that were made available through these places as well as all older editions' PDFs of the game.

In 2013, OneBookShelf was once again allowed to sell Dungeons & Dragons products through a new partnership with Wizards of the Coast. These products, from Advanced Dungeons & Dragons through the 4th Edition of the game, were sold on the DNDClassics website. In 2016, OneBookShelf launched a new digital storefront in partnership with Wizards of the Coast called the Dungeon Masters Guild (DMsGuild). The DNDClassics site was replaced by the new DMsGuild storefront. With the 5th Edition Dungeons & Dragons open game license, third party publishers are allowed to print and publish content based on the 5th Edition System Reference Document (SRD). The DMsGuild went a step further by allowing individuals and third-party publishers to create and sell content based on the Forgotten Realms. As of 2019, content can be based on other Wizards of the Coast intellectual property, such as Ravenloft, Eberron, and Ravnica.

=== Atari ===
In December 2009, Hasbro filed suit against Atari, claiming Atari had breached its Dungeons & Dragons licensing agreement when Atari sold its European distribution business to Namco Bandai Partners. Atari was accused of sub-licensing part of its exclusive D&D rights to Namco Bandai Partners without authorization. Hasbro also alleged Namco Bandai had obtained Hasbro's confidential information about D&D from Atari, and that Namco Bandai had posed as a D&D publisher for digital games previously published by Atari. Hasbro also claimed Atari had sold at least four of its subsidiaries actively engaged in D&D licensed activities to Namco Bandai while denying any relationship between itself and Namco Bandai with respect to D&D. Atari claimed Hasbro tried to unfairly take back rights granted to Atari, and has sought to resolve the matter without Hasbro's cooperation. On August 15, 2011, Wizards of the Coast, Hasbro, and Atari announced the settlement and resolution of the complaint against Atari and Atari's counterclaims against Hasbro. As part of the settlement, digital licensing rights for D&D were returned to Hasbro. Atari continued to develop and market several games under license from Hasbro and Wizards, including Dungeons & Dragons: Daggerdale and Heroes of Neverwinter for Facebook. In addition, as a result of the sales of Cryptic Studio to Perfect World Entertainment Inc., the release date of the Neverwinter video game was delayed to late 2012.

=== Dragonlance ===
In October 2020, Margaret Weis and Tracy Hickman filed suit against Wizards of the Coast for breaching a licensing deal with Weis and Hickman for a new Dragonlance novel trilogy. Boing Boing reported that "according to the lawsuit, Weis and Hickman agreed with Wizards of the Coast to produce the new novels in 2017, capping off the series and giving fans a final sendoff. But the company pulled the plug in August 2020". In December 2020, Weis and Hickman filed to voluntarily dismiss without prejudice their lawsuit, and "the filing noted that Wizards of the Coast had not formally answered their lawsuit, nor had they filed for a summary judgement". Weis and Hickman's publishing agent affirmed a few weeks later that a new trilogy of Dragonlance novels was in the works. In December 2021, it was announced that the first novel of the new series, Dragonlance: Dragons of Deceit, was scheduled for release on August 9, 2022.

== See also ==
- History of role-playing games
