= Mazes and Monsters =

1982 television film starring Tom Hanks

- VHS cover
- Genre: Fantasy drama; Psychological thriller
- Based on: Mazes and Monsters by Rona Jaffe
- Written by: Tom Lazarus
- Directed by: Steven Hilliard Stern
- Starring: Tom Hanks; Chris Makepeace; Wendy Crewson; David Wallace; Lloyd Bochner; Peter Donat; Louise Sorel; Susan Strasberg
- Music by: Hagood Hardy; Judith Lander (song "Friends in This World")
- Country of origin: United States
- Original language: English

Production
- Executive producer: Tom McDermott
- Producer: Richard Briggs
- Cinematography: Laszlo George
- Editor: Bill Parker
- Running time: 100 minutes
- Production companies: McDermott Productions; Procter & Gamble Productions

Original release
- Network: CBS
- Release: December 28, 1982

Mazes and Monsters, also known as Rona Jaffe's Mazes and Monsters, is a 1982 American made-for-television film directed by Steven Hilliard Stern about a group of college students and their interest in a fictitious role-playing game (RPG) of the same name. The film stars Tom Hanks in his first lead role.

== Plot ==
The film begins in medias res with a scene in which a reporter meets with police searching a cavern. He is told a game of Mazes and Monsters got out of hand.

Robbie Wheeling starts college at Grant University and soon develops a group of friends, all of whom have personal problems and issues. Jay-Jay feels marginalized by his mother, who constantly redecorates his room since she cannot make up her mind about the best look. In his "self-decorating", he wears a variety of unusual hats. Kate has had a series of failed relationships, and suffers from her father leaving home; Daniel's parents reject his dream of becoming a video game designer; and Robbie's alcoholic mother and strict father fight constantly, and he is still tormented by the mysterious disappearance of his brother, Hall. They are fans of Mazes and Monsters, a fantasy role-playing game over which Robbie was kicked out of his last school when he became too obsessed with it. Though he is reluctant, the other three students convince him to start playing again with them.

Through the course of playing the game, Robbie and Kate begin a romantic relationship; he confides in her that he still has nightmares about his missing brother. Eventually, Jay-Jay, upset by feeling left out by his friends, decides to commit suicide in a local cavern. In the process of planning it, he changes his mind and decides the cavern would be better suited to a new Mazes and Monsters campaign. He kills off his character to force them to start a new campaign, in which he says they will be living out their fantasy. He proposes playing his new game in a disused and condemned cavern, and dismisses the warnings from his friends – who reluctantly agree to participate.

During the actual spelunking, Robbie experiences a psychotic episode involving the last time he saw his brother, and hallucinates that he has slain a monster called a Gorvil. From this point forward, Robbie believes he is actually his character, the cleric Pardieu. This leads him to break off his relationship with Kate (to maintain celibacy) and start drawing maps that will lead him to a sacred place he has seen in his dreams, the Great Hall. In his dream, the Great Hall tells him to go to the Two Towers, and he disappears.

Robbie's friends report him to the police while concealing their trip into the caverns. They and police investigators suspect he is deceased. Robbie travels to New York City, where he stabs a mugger whom he imagines to be a monster. He sees blood on his knife, then his bloodied clothes in a window, and breaks out of his delusions long enough to call Kate from a payphone. After he agrees to go to Jay-Jay's house, a delusion leads him into the subway. Not finding him at Jay-Jay's house, the friends deduce Robbie has equated the Two Towers with the Twin Towers of the World Trade Center. Robbie believes that by jumping off one of them and casting a spell, he will finally join the Great Hall. After a search, his friends spot him wandering in the South Tower lobby. They fail to get his attention before Robbie proceeds to the elevator and ends up on the observation deck. Robbie prepares to jump, claiming that he has spells that enable him to fly. In spite of this, they succeed in stopping him from jumping by using the game's rules, once again pulling him out of his delusion.

Sometime later, the friends visit Robbie at his parents' estate, hoping to pick up their friendship where they left off. Though he is now in regular counseling, it is implied that Robbie will live out the rest of his life trapped in his imaginary world, believing he is Pardieu, that his friends are their characters, and that he is living at an inn (actually his parents' home) and paying for his boarding with a coin that "magically" reappears in his pouch each morning. He then tells his shocked friends of a great evil lurking in the forest across the lake, believing that it threatens the lives of the "innkeeper" and his wife. The three, feeling sorry for Robbie and guilty for their role in his psychotic break, decide to engage him in a "game" of Mazes and Monsters, letting Robbie dictate the events to them. In the end, Kate says, "And so ... we played the game again ... for one last time."

== Cast ==
- Tom Hanks as Robbie Wheeling
- Chris Makepeace as Jay "Jay-Jay" Brockway
- Wendy Crewson as Kate Finch
- David Wysocki as Daniel
- Lloyd Bochner as Hall
- Peter Donat as Harold
- Louise Sorel as Julia
- Susan Strasberg as Meg
- Anne Francis as Ellie
- Murray Hamilton as Lieutenant John Martini
- Vera Miles as Cat
- Chris Wiggins as King
- Kevin Peter Hall as Gorvil

== Production ==
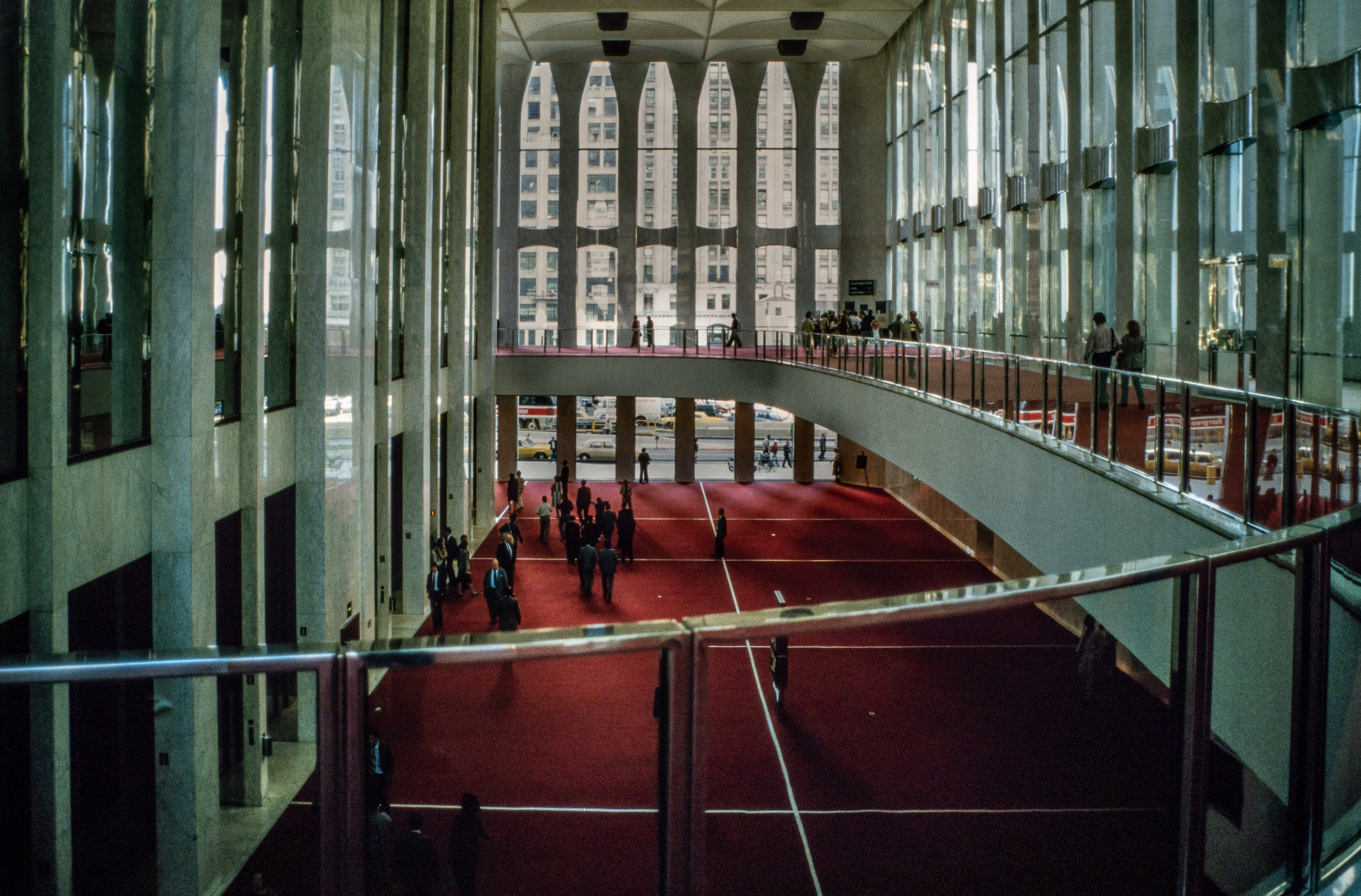
Inside the lobby of the World Trade Center South Tower (pictured in October 1983), where many of the film's climax scenes were filmed

The film was adapted from Rona Jaffe's 1981 novel Mazes and Monsters.

Jaffe based the novel on inaccurate newspaper stories about the disappearance of James Dallas Egbert III from Michigan State University in 1979. Early media accounts overemphasized Egbert's participation in fantasy role playing, speculating that his hobby of Dungeons & Dragons might have been a factor in his disappearance. William Dear, the private investigator hired to investigate the case, explained actual events and the reasons behind the media myth in his 1984 book The Dungeon Master. The public had received the novel amidst a climate of uncertainty regarding the new pastime of role-playing games. Jaffe's account was read by many as a legitimate depiction of role-playing games, as many of her readers had no prior knowledge of the subject. In fact, in 1985 psychiatrist and anti-television violence activist Thomas Radecki of the National Coalition on Television Violence cited a fictitious letter written by a character in the novel as "proof" that D&D had caused the death of gamers.

Like the novel on which it is based, the film touches on the claim that playing role-playing games could be related to psychological problems. At least one protagonist is (or appears to be) suffering from schizophrenia (or some analogous condition).

== Critical reception ==
The New York Times wrote in its review, "The younger actors are required to carry the film and, directed by Steven H. Stern, they do so with remarkable skill. The plot takes some startling turns... and in the end, the film achieves a broader "rites-of-passage" experience than most viewers might be expecting."

The Los Angeles Times said, "Mazes and Monsters is an impressive 1982 TV movie based on Rona Jaffe's novel about the effect of fantasy role-playing games on four college students. Tom Hanks stars."

== Home media ==
The film has been available on VHS, DVD, and various streaming services. On September 19, 2022, Plumeria Pictures released a 40th-anniversary Blu-ray, the film's first high-definition release.

== See also ==
- Dark Dungeons (film) - 2014 short film based on the Chick tract of the same name
- The Dungeonmaster – 1984 film by Charles Band and Ted Nicolaou
- Dungeons & Dragons controversies
- History of role-playing games
- Hobgoblin (novel) – 1981 novel by John Coyne
- Media circus – Phrase describing excessive media coverage
- Moral panic – Fear that some evil threatens society
- Sensationalism – Type of editorial tactic used in mass media
- Skullduggery (1983 film) – 1983 Canadian horror film
