= Mazes and Monsters (novel) =

1981 novel by Rona Jaffe

- Author: Rona Jaffe
- Language: English
- Genre: Novel
- Publisher: Delacorte Press (USA) & Hodder & Stoughton Ltd. (UK)
- Publication date: September 1981 (USA Hardback), 01 February 1982 (UK Hardback) & 15 July 1982 (USA Paperback)
- Publication place: United States
- Media type: Print (Hardback, Large print ed., Paperback)
- Pages: 329 pp (USA Hardback)
- ISBN: 0-440-05536-9 (US hardback edition), ISBN 0-340-27820-X (UK hardback edition) & ISBN 0-440-15699-8 (US paperback edition), ISBN 0-8161-3324-7 (US Large print edition)
- OCLC: 7276660
- Dewey Decimal: 813/.54 19
- LC Class: PS3519.A453 M3

Mazes and Monsters is a 1981 novel by Rona Jaffe. The novel is a cautionary tale regarding the then-new hobby of fantasy role-playing games. The book was adapted into a made-for-television movie by the same name in 1982 starring Tom Hanks.

== Background ==
The novel is based in large part on the largely apocryphal "steam tunnel incidents" of the late 1970s. These urban myths developed during the infancy of role playing games, generally purporting that university students playing a live action version of Dungeons & Dragons or a similar game disappeared into the utility tunnels of the school and became lost, and in some cases died of hypothermia or other causes. The legends had risen due to newspaper reports concerning the disappearance of a Michigan State University student named James Dallas Egbert III. Egbert had played Dungeons & Dragons and did in fact go into the steam tunnels of his school, but with the intent of committing suicide. When his attempt on his life failed, he hid at various friends' houses for several weeks. During this time the private investigator hired by Egbert's parents to find him speculated in the press that perhaps Egbert had gone into the steam tunnels to play a live version of the game and gotten lost. The media reported the theory as fact and caused controversy over the effects of playing the game.

The public received the novel amidst a climate of uncertainty regarding the new pastime of role-playing games. Jaffe's account was read by many as a legitimate depiction of role-playing games, as many of her readers had no prior knowledge of the subject. In fact, in 1985 psychiatrist and anti-television violence activist Thomas Radecki of the National Coalition on Television Violence cited a fictitious letter written by a character in this novel as "proof" that D&D had caused the death of gamers.

== Content ==
Like the contemporary Hobgoblin, this is a species of social problem novel (although not aimed at young adult readers), by an established writer, which treats the playing of role-playing games as indicative of deep neurotic needs. In both books, the protagonist has a mental health condition, and the attainment of mature adulthood is accompanied by the abandonment of role-playing games.

== Context and reception ==
Sales of the book may have benefited in the early 1980s from other negative media reports regarding D&D and similar games, such as those promulgated by Bothered About Dungeons and Dragons, an anti-RPG advocacy group. This negative media climate, combined with the dramatic fictional events portrayed in Jaffe's book, led CBS to contract for the television rights to the novel. The movie adaptation premiered on the network in 1982, and starred 26-year-old Tom Hanks as a gamer whose obsession prevents him from being able to tell what is real and what is fantasy.

== See also ==
- The Dungeon Master - book on the Egbert incident by William Dear
- History of role-playing games
- Media circus
- Moral panic
- Sensationalism
