= Hobgoblin (disambiguation) =

A hobgoblin is a type of fairy or monster.

Hobgoblin may also refer to:

- Hobgoblin (Dungeons & Dragons), an adaptation of the monster for the D&D role-playing game
- Hobgoblin (Marvel Comics), a comic book supervillain in the Marvel Comics universe, an enemy of Spider-Man
  - "The Hobgoblin" (Spider-Man), an episode of Spider-Man: The Animated Series, featuring Marvel Comics' Hobgoblin as the villain
  - Hobgoblin (Imperial Guard), a different Marvel character also known as the Hobgoblin
- Hobgoblin (Moomin), a powerful magician in the 1948 Moomin novel Finn Family Moomintroll
- Hobgoblin (beer), a type of beer manufactured by the UK-based Wychwood Brewery
- Hobgoblin (novel), a 1981 horror novel by John Coyne
- Hobgoblins (film), a 1988 B-movie, largely known for its appearance on Mystery Science Theater 3000
- The Hobgoblin (1924 film), a 1924 German silent thriller film
- The Hobgoblin (1990 film), alternate title for the movie Quest for the Mighty Sword
- "Hobgoblin" (song), the lead single from CLC's 2017 album Crystyle
- Þursaflokkurinn, an Icelandic progressive rock group the name of which means "The Hobgoblins" in English
