= Hobgoblin (novel) =

1981 novel by John Coyne

- Author: John Coyne
- Language: English
- Genre: Horror
- Publication date: 1981
- Publication place: United States
- Media type: Print (Hardback & Paperback)

Hobgoblin is a 1981 horror novel by American writer John Coyne about Scott Gardiner, a teenaged boy who becomes obsessed with Hobgoblin, a fantasy roleplaying game based on Irish mythology, as his life in the game and in reality slowly blend.

== Description ==
Like the contemporaneously-published Mazes and Monsters by Rona Jaffe, this is a species of problem novel (although not aimed at young adult readers) by an established writer, which treats the playing of roleplaying games as indicative of deep neurotic needs. In both books, the protagonist is (or at least appears to be) suffering from schizophrenia (or some analogous condition); in both books, the attainment of mature adulthood is accompanied by the abandonment of role-playing games.

== Context and reception ==
Like the Jaffe book, Hobgoblin was published at the height of Dungeons & Dragons' popularity and soon after the intense media coverage of the Egbert steam tunnel incident. The Egbert case resulted in urban myths wherein roleplaying gamers enacting live action role-playing games perish, often in the utility tunnels below their university campuses. In a 2015 interview after the novel was reprinted by Dover Books, Coyne flatly stated that while he had read about Egbert, the case had no influence in his writing the book. Coyne said that he had become intrigued by Dungeons & Dragons after a nephew had become an avid player, and he became interested. "I saw in D&D, and the whole idea of such games, a way to move my story telling in a new direction. What if characters in a fantasy game became characters in real life? That idea intrigued me and to understand this whole world, I began to play the game so I could write Hobgoblin."

The Kirkus Reviews review seems to miss the Egbert connection entirely, unlike the Dragon Magazine review, dismissing the work as "Skin-deep horror--but better-crafted and less lurid than previous Coynage."

C. J. Henderson reviewed Hobgoblin for Pegasus magazine and stated that "The tale is so skillfully woven that even the reader, who knows at least as much as, and, sometimes, more than, most of the characters at any given time, does not see the truth, either, until the end. This is as it should be in any good mystery tale, and it is in this that the true genius of John Coyne's Hobgoblin lies."
