= John Coyne (writer) =

American writer

- Born: 1937 (age 88–89); Chicago, Illinois, United States
- Occupation: Writer

John Coyne (born 1937) is an American writer. He is the author of more than 25 nonfiction and fiction books, including a number of horror novels, and his short stories have been collected in "best of" anthologies such as Modern Masters of Horror and The Year's Best Fantasy and Horror. A former Peace Corps volunteer and a lifelong lover of golf, he has edited and written books dealing with both subjects, including The Caddie Who Knew Ben Hogan, The Caddie Who Played With Hickory, and The Caddie Who Won the Masters. His most recent book is the love story Long Ago and Far Away.

== Life ==
Coyne was born in Chicago, Illinois. At age ten he began working as a caddie at Midlothian Country Club. Both his parents were from the west of Ireland; his father was from a remote area, and had spoken only the Irish language until he was about twelve. As a result, Coyne grew up with bedtime stories of Ireland, on which he would later draw for his Dungeons & Dragons-influenced novel Hobgoblin.

After graduating from Saint Louis University, he earned a master's in English at Western Michigan University, served in the Air Force, and served in the Peace Corps from 1962 to 1964, teaching English at the Commercial School in Addis Ababa, Ethiopia. He currently lives in Pelham Manor, New York, with his wife and son, where he works in communications and edits PeaceCorpsWriters.org.

== Writing career ==
Coyne became one of modern horror fiction's "brand name" writers with the publication of his first novel, The Piercing, in 1979. He followed this with a number of other horror novels, including bestsellers such as The Legacy and Hobgoblin, before cutting back on genre writing in the mid-1980s. His short stories have been collected in a number of "best of" anthologies, including Modern Masters of Horror and The Year's Best Fantasy and Horror.

The Caddie Who Knew Ben Hogan, was published in 2006 and is a literary exploration of golf and everyday life. Norman Rush praised the novel, saying, "John Coyne has managed to employ golf as a lens through which aspects of Midwestern daily life in the 1940s, of thwarted love, of social class, are revealed with stark and unsettling clarity."

Coyne is the author of two other golf novels: The Caddie Who Played With Hickory, which is set in 1946 at the Midlothian Country Club, and The Caddie Who Won the Masters, set at Augusta National. His most recent novel is Long Ago and Far Away, a love story spanning forty years.

== Bibliography ==
=== Novels ===
- The Piercing, New York: G.P. Putnam’s Sons, 1979
- The Legacy, NY: Berkeley, 1979
- The Searing, NY: G.P. Putnam’s Sons, 1980
- Hobgoblin, NY: G.P. Putnam’s Sons, 1981
- The Shroud, NY: Berkley, 1983
- Brothers & Sisters, NY: Dutton, 1986
- The Hunting Season, NY: Macmillan, 1987
- Fury, NY: Warner Books, 1989
- Child of Shadows, NY: Warner Books, 1990
- The Caddie Who Knew Ben Hogan, Thomas Dunne Books, 2006; paperback, St. Martin's Griffin, 2007
- The Caddie Who Played With Hickory, Thomas Dunne Books, 2008; paperback, St. Martin's Griffin, 2009

=== Selected short stories ===
- "Cabin in the Woods", Alfred Hitchcock's Mystery Magazine, July 1976. Reprinted in Modern Masters of Horror (1988).
- "The Crazy Chinaman", published in The Dodd Mead Gallery of Horror, ed. Charles L. Grant, 1983. Reprinted in Gallery of Horror by Stephen King, Charles L. Grant, 1997.
- "Snow Man", published in Monsters in Our Midst, ed. Robert Bloch, 1993. Reprinted in The Year's Best Fantasy and Horror: Seventh Annual Collection (1994).
- "The Ecology of Reptiles", published in Predators, ed. Ed Gorman & Martin H. Greenberg, 1993. reprinted in The Year's Best Fantasy and Horror: Seventh Annual Collection (1994).

=== Anthologies ===
- Ellery Queen's Crookbook, Random House, 1974 (contributor)* Ellery Queen's Crookbook, Random House 1974 First John Coyne publication, per editor's note. Fiction anthology
- Alfred Hitchcock's Tales to Take Your Breath Away, NY: Dial Press, 1977 (contributor)
- Hitchcock's Anthology, 1977 (contributor)
- The Berkley Showcase: New Writings in Science Fiction and Fantasy, no date (contributor)
- Modern Masters Of Horror, Coward, McCann & Geoghegan, 1981 (contributor)
- Dodd Mead Gallery Of Horror, 1983 (contributor)
- The Second Black Lizard Anthology of Crime Fiction, 1988 (contributor)
- Masques IV, Pulphouse Publishing, 1993 (contributor)
- Monsters in Our Midst, Tor, 1993 (contributor)
- Predators, Roc, 1993 (contributor)
- The Year's Best Fantasy & Horror (contributor), St. Martin's Press, 1994
- Gallery of Horror (contributor), Penguin Group, 1997.
- Living on the Edge: Fiction by Peace Corps Writers, editor and contributor, Curbstone Press, 1999

=== Selected Nonfiction ===
- Letters from the Peace Corps (contributor), Washington: Robert B. Luce, Inc., 1964
- Better Golf, Follett, 1972
- This Way Out: A Guide to Alternatives to Traditional College Education in the United States, Europe and the Third World, with Tom Hebert, NY: Dutton, 1972 (co-author)
- Getting Skilled: A Guide to Private Trade and Technical Schools, with Tom Hebert, NY: Dutton, 1972 (co-author)
- New Golf For Women, NY: Doubleday, 1973
- By Hand: A Guide to Schools and Careers in Crafts, with Tom Hebert, NY: Dutton, 1974 (co-author)
- Listing removed to "Anthologies" section above. See notes appended. Fiction anthology, first Coyne story publication (Anthology title corrected)
- Playing with the Pros: Golf Instruction from the Senior Tour, NY: Dutton, 1990
- Peace Corps Writers Talk About Their Craft: Talking with... (21 Interviews), Rochester, NY: RPCV Writers & Readers, 1992 (Editor)
- Going Up Country, Travel Essays by Peace Corps Writers, Scribner's, 1994 (editor)
- To Touch the World: The Peace Corps Experience, editor and contributor, Peace Corps/USGPO, DC, 1994, 1995
- At Home in the World: The Peace Corps Story, editor and contributor, Peace Corps/USGPO, 1996
- Peace Corps: The Great Adventure, editor and contributor, Peace Corps/USGPO, 1997, 1999
