= The Legacy (1978 film) =

1978 film by Richard Marquand

- Theatrical release poster
- Directed by: Richard Marquand
- Screenplay by: Jimmy Sangster; Patrick Tilley; Paul Wheeler
- Story by: Jimmy Sangster
- Produced by: David Foster
- Starring: Katharine Ross; Sam Elliott; Roger Daltrey
- Cinematography: Dick Bush; Alan Hume
- Edited by: Anne V. Coates
- Music by: Michael J. Lewis
- Distributed by: Universal Pictures (United States); Columbia-Warner Distributors (United Kingdom)
- Release dates: 29 September 1978 (United Kingdom); 28 September 1979 (U.S.)
- Running time: 100 minutes
- Countries: United Kingdom; United States
- Language: English
- Budget: US$2.5 million
- Box office: $11.36 million (U.S.)

The Legacy is a 1978 horror film directed by Richard Marquand, in his directorial debut, and starring Katharine Ross, Sam Elliott, Roger Daltrey, John Standing, and Margaret Tyzack. It follows an American couple who are summoned to a British mansion while visiting England for a work obligation, where they stumble upon its family's curse.

A co-production between the United Kingdom and the United States, The Legacy was released in the United Kingdom in September 1978, and one year later in the United States.

== Plot ==
Maggie Walsh and her boyfriend Pete Danner are interior decorators from Los Angeles. Maggie receives a large financial retainer from an anonymous client in Britain for an unspecified piece of work. They are reluctant to abandon their current client in California, but are released when that client dies suddenly under mysterious circumstances. Using their pre-paid airfare, they travel to England; soon after, they are involved in a traffic collision with a chauffeur-driven Rolls-Royce. The passenger and owner, Jason Mountolive, invites them to his rambling country estate, Ravenhurst, where they are greeted by Nurse Adams.

They find that Mountolive has also invited the five potential heirs to his financial estate, all public figures with notorious reputations. The other guests explain that they have been summoned because Jason is dying, "wasting away" above the stairs. Maggie is astonished to hear this because Jason seemed vigorous just minutes earlier.

Shortly afterward one of the guests, Maria Gabrieli, despite being an excellent swimmer, becomes trapped under the surface of Jason's indoor pool and drowns.

Mountolive receives his guests in his bedroom, a sterile chrome and glass environment where he lies connected to a life support system. His bed is shrouded by white curtains that obscure his appearance. He calls Maggie to the bedside, where a monstrous hand reaches out of the curtains and places a signet ring on her finger with the Mountolive family crest upon it. The other guests already wear identical rings. Maggie tries to remove the ring, but it cannot be taken from her finger. Maggie and Pete find they are unable to leave the Ravenhurst grounds.

The other guests begin to die by mysterious and gruesome means. Clive Jackson gets a chicken bone lodged in his throat during dinner (although he was not eating chicken at the time) and perishes during a botched tracheotomy. Karl Liebnecht is incinerated by a massive burst of flame from a fireplace that leaves the rest of the room untouched. A mirror in Barbara Kirstenburg's bedroom explodes, piercing her with glass shards, then restores itself without a crack. Jacques Grandier suspects Maggie and Pete of engineering these inexplicable deaths, and makes his way onto the roof with a shotgun. After taking a few shots at Pete, the weapon jams and explodes in his face, knocking him off the roof to his death.

Maggie and Pete find a collection of newspaper clippings. These reveal that each of their fellow guests had been accused of serious crimes or implicated in major scandals, yet always escaped punishment or censure thanks to Mountolive's intervention. Mountolive's ancestors were Lady Margaret Walsingham (whose portrait Maggie closely resembles) and the Lord of Mountolive; both families included notorious practitioners of black magic and witchcraft. Lady Margaret and her husband were burned at the stake for heresy. Maggie realises that she is Jason's great-granddaughter, and that the retainer was a ruse to lure her to Ravenhurst before Mountolive dies so he could appoint her as his sixth potential heir.

As the last remaining heir to Mountolive's legacy, Maggie stands to inherit the vast Walsingham-Mountolive financial empire. She confronts Mountolive. With his last breath, he confesses that he sacrificed the other heirs to the Devil in order to pass on his sinister powers to her. He instructs her to choose six heirs of her own, who will likewise be sacrificed when the time comes so that the lone survivor will also inherit the powers bestowed by Satan.

Pete forces his way into the room and tries to prevent the transfer of power by sabotaging Mountolive's life-support system. He is too late; Maggie has accepted her legacy and is now "Lady Margaret". The household staff declares their allegiance to her. Maggie selects Pete as her first beneficiary. She gives him a signet ring which immediately attaches itself to his finger.

== Cast ==
- Katharine Ross as Maggie Walsh
- Sam Elliott as Pete Danner
- Roger Daltrey as Clive Jackson
- John Standing as Jason Mountolive
- Ian Hogg as Harry
- Margaret Tyzack as Nurse Adams
- Charles Gray as Karl Liebnecht
- Lee Montague as Jacques Grandier
- Hildegard Neil as Barbara Kirstenburg
- Marianne Broome as Maria Gabrieli

== Themes ==
Themes presented in the film include karma, and reincarnation.

== Production ==
=== Screenplay ===
Jimmy Sangster originally wrote a supernatural script set in a run-down hospital in downtown Detroit. Much to his dismay, the script was altered to more closely resemble other Hammer movies. Although keeping the American protagonists, events were manipulated to allow the story instead to take place in an English country estate featuring a collection of stereotypical butlers, chauffeurs and curtseying maids.

The film had the working title The Devil’s Doorway, and was also known as Psychose, and The Legacy of Maggie Walsh.

=== Casting ===
Considered for Karl were Harry Andrews, Peter Cushing, Bernard Archard, Herbert Lom, Donald Pleasence, Christopher Lee, Michael Gough, Anton Diffring, Peter Arne, Patrick Troughton, Peter Vaughan and Donald Houston.

Considered for Grandier were Peter Arne, Frank Finlay, Peter Jeffrey, Joss Ackland, Ian Bannen, John Carson and Ian Hendry.

=== Filming ===
Principal photography began on 16 January 1978 at Bray Studios in Berkshire, England, concluding on 23 March 1978. Other filming locations included Mountolive Manor House and Loseley Park in Guildford, Surrey.

Anne Coates recalled she had lunch with Richard Marquand "and he sold the idea of the film, and I thought, God! this is a director who really knows what he is doing... But unfortunately when he actually got on the floor... he clearly didn't know what he was doing at all."

== Release ==
=== Box office ===
The Legacy premiered in the United Kingdom on 29 September 1978, before having its U.S. premiere approximately one year later, opening in New York City on 28 September 1979. It subsequently premiered in Los Angeles on 16 November 1979. The US theatrical cut has a 2-minute shorter runtime and some alternative shots.

Coates said the film "is almost continually on American televisions. Funny how you make some quite good films and some that you're not that proud of. And it's a very popular film, funnily enough. I don't think it ever was particularly as a, a cinema film."

=== Critical response ===
Audience reception was mixed, but most critics found the good aspects of the film overshadowed by its shortcomings.

John Corry of The New York Times described The Legacy as a 'depressing' horror film, stating “in place of invention it uses contrivance, and in place of imagination it uses shock”. Variety stated "The film, directed with no tension or suspenseful pacing...takes an eternity to get down to business". People magazine negatively compared it to The Exorcist.

Dread Central wrote a mixed review for The Legacy, stating, "It’s hard to hate a movie that spends most of its time being so off-the-wall ridiculous. The Legacy doesn’t remotely work in the way it was intended to but, despite a few dull stretches, there’s plenty of nonsense on display to enjoy." HorrorNews.net's review was also mixed, and praised Daltrey's acting and the film's settings, while criticizing the film's upbeat soundtrack and plot holes.

Two years after its release, Sam Elliott gave an interview to Jerry Buck of the Associated Press in which he said, "I wouldn't rush out to see it. It's about fifteen years behind its time." On Rotten Tomatoes, the film holds a rating of 19% from 16 reviews.

=== Home media ===
Universal Studios released The Legacy on DVD in North America on 7 September 2004. Scream Factory released The Legacy a Blu-ray edition North America on 15 September 2015. British distributor Powerhouse Films released a new region-free limited edition Blu-ray through their Indicator series on 29 July 2019.

== Soundtrack ==
The original music score was composed by Michael J. Lewis. The opening-credits theme song ("Another Side of Me") is performed by Kiki Dee.

== References in other media ==
The Legacy movie poster was seen in Fade To Black (1980), and the video case is shown in the documentary Ban the Sadist Videos! (2005). Video clips of The Legacy were featured in season 3, episode 11 of the show Sneak Previews (1979).

== Adaptations into other mediums ==
John Coyne was asked to write a novelization in six weeks to promote the movie. Reviews unanimously prefer the novelization over the movie, and the book was briefly a best-seller.

== Legacy ==
The Legacy is perhaps best remembered now for being the film where Hollywood couple Katharine Ross (Margaret Walsh) and Sam Elliott (Pete Danner) first met. During production, he was single, while she was married to the Italian-American actor Gaetano Lisi. Ross's marriage ended the following year and, eventually, the pair announced their romance to the public. They married in 1984. In fact, this wasn't the first film on which they had worked, as they both starred in Butch Cassidy and the Sundance Kid several years previously. Ross was the leading lady in that film and a bona fide movie star while Elliott was merely what he called a "glorified extra", which left him without the courage to approach her.

== Sources ==
- Nowell, Richard (2011). Blood Money: A History of the First Teen Slasher Film Cycle. London, England: Continuum. ISBN 978-1-441-14316-7.
- Pykett, Derek (2014). British Horror Film Locations. Jefferson, North Carolina: McFarland. ISBN 978-0-786-45193-7.
