= William Dear (detective) =

American investigator and writer (1937–2024)

William C. Dear (August 1, 1937 – July 5, 2024) was an American private investigator.

== Life and career ==
Dear owned the firm William C. Dear & Associates. His notable cases included the original "steam tunnel incident" involving James Dallas Egbert III, the murder of millionaire businessman Dean Milo in 1980, the exhumation of Lee Harvey Oswald in 1981 and the Glen Courson murder case in 1986.

Television work included being an investigator on Alien Autopsy, a 1995 Fox Television program about an autopsy supposedly carried out on an extraterrestrial being. Dear was later featured in the 2000 BBC Documentary OJ: The Untold Story.

Dear was a candidate for Governor of Texas in the 2010 Texas Democratic Primary. Dear died on July 5, 2024, at the age of 86.

== Books ==
- 1984: The Dungeon Master: The Disappearance of James Dallas Egbert III (Houghton Mifflin, Boston)
- 1989: "Please ... Don't Kill Me": The True Story of the Milo Murder (Houghton Mifflin, Boston) (with Carlton Stowers)
- 1992: Private Detective: From the Files of the World's Greatest Private Eye (Bloomsbury, London)
- 2001: O.J. Is Guilty But Not of Murder (Dear Overseas)
- 2012: O.J. is Innocent and I Can Prove It: The Shocking Truth about the Murders of Nicole Simpson and Ron Goldman (Skyhorse Publishing)

Dear's webpage lists three other books: a novel, Dead Men Don't Lie, and two instructional books, Adopted: How to Find Your Biological Parents and Other Family Members and Fingerprinting: How to Take Mistake-Proof Fingerprint Impressions.
