= Rona Jaffe =

American novelist (1931–2005)

- Jaffe in 1974
- Born: June 12, 1931; New York City, U.S.
- Died: December 30, 2005 (aged 74); London, England
- Education: Radcliffe College
- Occupation: Novelist
- Years active: 1958–2003

Rona Jaffe (June 12, 1931 – December 30, 2005) was an American novelist who published numerous works from 1958 to 2003. During the 1960s, she also wrote cultural pieces for Cosmopolitan.

== Early life ==
Jaffe was born into a Jewish family in 1931 Brooklyn, New York City, the only child of Samuel Jaffe, an elementary-school principal, and his first wife, Diana (née Ginsberg). Her grandfather was a construction magnate who built the Carlyle Hotel. Growing up in affluent circumstances on the Upper East Side of Manhattan, she attended the Dalton School before graduating from Radcliffe College in 1951.

== Career ==
Jaffe wrote her first book, The Best of Everything (1958), while working as an associate editor at Fawcett Publications in the 1950s. It was quickly adapted into a film starring Hope Lange and a group of actresses including Joan Crawford, also called The Best of Everything (1959). The book has been described as distinctly "pre-women's liberation" in the way it depicts women in the working world. Camille Paglia noted in 2004 that the book and popular HBO series Sex and the City had much in common in that the characters in both (who have similar lives) are "very much at the mercy of cads".

During the late 1960s, Helen Gurley Brown hired Jaffe to write cultural pieces for Cosmopolitan, with a "Sex and the Single Girl" slant.

In 1981, Jaffe published Mazes and Monsters, which depicted a Dungeons & Dragons-like game that caused disorientation and hallucinations among its players and incited them to violence and attempted suicide. Written at a time of emerging anxiety over the effects of role-playing games (RPGs), the book might have been loosely based on press accounts of the 1979 "steam tunnel incident" involving the disappearance of Michigan State University student and D&D aficionado James Dallas Egbert III. With both concerns over and interest in role-playing games further stoked by the efforts of anti-RPG campaigners such as Patricia Pulling, founder of the advocacy group Bothered About Dungeons & Dragons (B.A.D.D.), within a year of publication Mazes and Monsters was adapted by CBS into a made-for-TV movie called Mazes and Monsters (1982).

In 2005, Jaffe died of cancer while vacationing in London, aged 74.

== Works ==
- The Best of Everything (Simon & Schuster, 1958)
- Away from Home (Simon & Schuster, 1960)
- The Last of the Wizards ( juvenile) (Simon & Schuster, 1961)
- Mr. Right Is Dead (novella and five short stories) (Simon & Schuster, 1965)
- The Cherry in the Martini (Simon & Schuster, 1966)
- The Fame Game (Random House, 1969)
- The Other Woman (Morrow, 1972)
- Family Secrets (Simon & Schuster, 1974)
- The Last Chance (Simon & Schuster, 1976)
- Class Reunion (Delacorte, 1979)
- Mazes and Monsters (Delacorte, 1981)
- After the Reunion (Delacorte, 1985)
- An American Love Story (Delacorte, 1990)
- The Cousins (Donald I. Fine, 1995) (Literary Guild and Doubleday Book Club selection)
- Five Women (Donald I. Fine, 1997)
- The Road Taken (Dutton, 2000)
- The Room-Mating Season (Dutton, 2003)
