= Thomas Radecki =

American psychiatrist and advocate

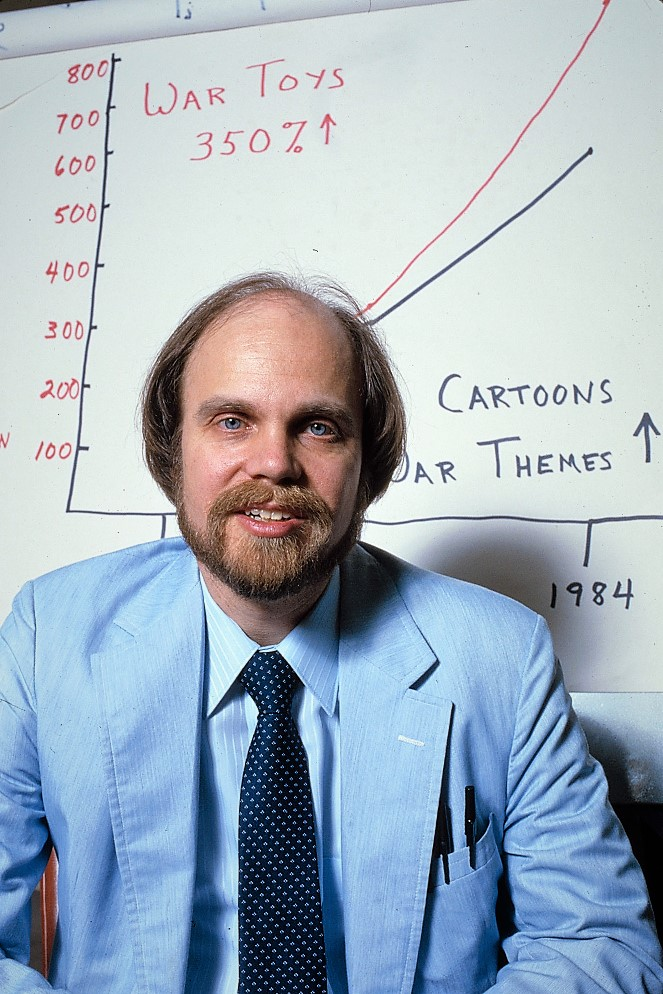
- Radecki in 1985
- Born: 1946 (age 79–80)
- Occupation: Psychiatrist
- Known for: Criminal activity, opposition to portrayals of violence

Thomas Edward Radecki (born 1946) is an American former psychiatrist, founding member of the National Coalition on Television Violence, and convicted criminal. He is known for his controversial views on the effects of portrayals of violence on teens and his opposition to depictions of violence in any form. He was later convicted of abusing his position as a doctor to commit sexual offenses; he was accused of trading prescription of opioids in exchange for sex with female patients. He is serving an 11 to 22 year prison sentence.

== Education ==
He attended Ohio State College of Medicine, class of 1973, where he received his MD. His postgraduate education was done at the Philadelphia General Hospital and the Hospital of the University of Pennsylvania.

He received his Juris Doctor degree after studies at the Oklahoma City University School of Law (1995–1996), and the Southern Illinois University School of Law (1996–1998).

== Career ==
He was licensed to practice as a doctor in West Virginia (1977–1979) and Kentucky.

In 1985, Radecki cited a fictitious letter written by a character in the novel Mazes and Monsters as "proof" that the game Dungeons & Dragons had caused the death of gamers. Radecki said in 1987 that "There is no doubt in my mind that the game Dungeons and Dragons is causing young men to kill themselves and others." In 1987 he testified as an expert on the effects of Dungeons & Dragons on behalf of Darren Molitor (convicted of murder in 1985) at an appeal, along with Patricia Pulling. The court rejected his testimony.

It later emerged that his claims of being on the faculty of the University of Illinois College of Medicine were based solely in being listed as "clinical faculty" (signifying that he was accredited to practice at a teaching hospital). He continued to claim this faculty status for years after accreditation was removed in 1985.

In March 1992, the Illinois Department of Professional Regulation revoked his medical license for a five-year minimum as a result of "allegations of inappropriate sexual activity by Dr. Radecki with one of his female patients.".

Radecki resigned from NCTV, turning it over to a colleague, Carole Lieberman. His request for early reinstatement of his license was rejected, following complaints about his Surrogate Parenting Institute, a fertility clinic. His license was restored in 2002, and he was placed on probation, which ended in 2008.

He was also research director for the International Coalition Against Violent Entertainment, which published a 1988 study of films and the level of violence therein, as well as a board member of the Parents Music Resource Center.

He has advocated for the use of Tramadol as a replacement of Suboxone.

In September 2012, Radecki voluntarily surrendered his Pennsylvania medical license while facing allegations of unprofessional conduct with patients. These allegations included that Radecki traded drugs to patients for sex.

In August 2013, Pennsylvania Attorney General Kathleen Kane announced Radecki's arrest for overprescribing, trading opioid-addiction treatment drugs for sex through a program he ran in several counties called "Doctors & Lawyers for a Drug Free Youth". In June 2016, he was sentenced to an 11- to 22-year prison term as a result of the case. In February 2018, a judge rejected a request that his sentence be reduced because of his age and because of what Radecki claimed was improperly introduced evidence in his case.

== Articles ==
- Radecki, Thomas E. "Violent Behavior Images Diet of Media Violence", Social Alternatives, May 1987, pp. 8–21
- Radecki, Thomas E.; C. Dianne Zdunich (Winter 1993). "Tobacco Sales to Minors in 97 US and Canadian Communities". Tobacco Control. 2 (4): 300–305. doi:10.1136/tc.2.4.300. JSTOR 20206915. PMC 1759291.
- Radecki, Thomas E. (1994). "The sales of lottery tickets to minors in Illinois". Journal of Gambling Studies. 10 (3): 213–218. doi:10.1007/BF02104963. PMID 24234919. S2CID 8373793.
- DiFranza, Joseph R.; Peck, Richard M.; Radecki, Thomas E.; Savageau, Judith A. (February 2001). "What Is the Potential Cost-Effectiveness of Enforcing a Prohibition on the Sale of Tobacco to Minors?". Preventive Medicine. 32 (2): 168–174. doi:10.1006/pmed.2000.0795. PMID 11162343.
