= The Jungles of Chult =

Dungeons & Dragons rulebook

- Author: James Lowder and Jean Rabe
- Genre: Role-playing game
- Publisher: TSR
- Publication date: 1993
- Media type: Print
- Pages: 64

The Jungles of Chult (product code FRM1) is an accessory for the Dungeons & Dragons campaign setting Forgotten Realms released in 1993.

== Contents ==
The Jungles of Chult describes the Chultan Peninsula of Faerûn. The location is known for having dinosaurs and undead.

This is a 64-page booklet that includes a fold-out color poster map of the region.

== Publication history ==
The book was written by James Lowder and Jean Rabe. Cover art is by Robh Ruppel, with interior illustrations by Terry Dykstra, and cartography by Steve Beck.
