= James Dallas Egbert III =

American student (1962–1980)

- Born: October 29, 1962; Dayton, Ohio, United States
- Died: August 16, 1980 (aged 17); Dayton, Ohio, United States
- Occupation: College student

James Dallas Egbert III (October 29, 1962 – August 16, 1980) was a student at Michigan State University who disappeared from his dormitory room on August 15, 1979. The disappearance was widely reported before he was located a month later. No reason for his disappearance was made public, but Egbert was said to have twice attempted suicide during the period he was missing. He killed himself slightly more than a year after the disappearance.

Egbert's participation in the role-playing game Dungeons & Dragons was identified as a possible factor in his disappearance. The case vaulted the previously obscure game to nationwide attention.

== Background ==
Egbert was born in Dayton, Ohio, and grew up in Huber Heights, a Dayton suburb, attending Wayne High School. He was a child prodigy, and entered Michigan State University at age 15, where he majored in computer science. Personal problems cited in the reports of his suicide attempt and disappearance include depression, loneliness, parental pressure, drug addiction, and (according to the private detective who would later search for him) difficulty in coming to terms with his homosexuality.

== Disappearance ==
Egbert left his dormitory room at Case Hall on August 15, 1979, after writing a suicide note, and entered the university's steam tunnels. He consumed some methaqualone, intending to die by suicide, but he survived. He woke up the next day and went into hiding at a friend's house. Gen Con XII, a convention dedicated to tabletop role-playing games, began that day in Wisconsin, and some attendees reported that they had seen him there. Meanwhile, a police search for Egbert began.

On August 22, Egbert's parents hired William Dear, a private investigator who was an acquaintance of Egbert's uncle, to help locate their son. According to Dear, in their first conversation, Egbert's mother raised the possibility that her son had died by suicide. She complained that Michigan State had not notified them that their son was missing until August 20, five days after he was last seen.

On August 24, Michael Stuart, a journalist for the university's newspaper, The State News, published details of the case, including the assertion by an anonymous friend of Egbert's that the missing student was "known to leave campus before for destinations unknown". Stuart's article prompted growing media interest in Egbert's disappearance.

After Dear learned that Egbert had played Dungeons & Dragons, he publicly amplified police theories that Egbert's disappearance was linked to the game. Students were said to play live-action sessions of the game in the steam maintenance tunnels below the campus, and it was speculated that Egbert had entered the tunnels and had either been injured or lost his way. This alleged connection of the role-playing game to Egbert's disappearance prompted what some Michigan State University students and faculty thought was sensationalist coverage of both Egbert and the game in media outlets throughout the United States. Dungeons & Dragons was described by some journalists as a "bizarre and secretive cult" that players could only join "by invitation".

The search for Egbert continued unsuccessfully for several weeks. It was later learned that, during this time, Egbert moved between two other houses in East Lansing, and then finally left the city via bus for New Orleans.

While he was in New Orleans, Egbert made a second suicide attempt by consuming a cyanide compound. This attempt also failed. He then moved on to Morgan City, Louisiana, where he found employment as "a laborer at an oil field", according to a 2014 online article by Jason Louv. After only four days on the job, Egbert, aware that Dear was searching for him, telephoned Dear and gave him his location. Dear traveled to Louisiana (other sources reported Texas) and recovered Egbert. Upon meeting the investigator, Egbert asked him not to disclose what he had learned about his whereabouts in the preceding weeks. Dear agreed and released Egbert, who was still legally a juvenile, into the custody of his uncle Marvin Gross on September 13, 1979.

== Later life and death ==
The New York Times, in its obituary for Egbert, summarized the subsequent phase of his life. "Dallas Egbert transferred last year from Michigan State to Wright State University"—near his parents' home in Dayton—"where he continued to study computer systems until he dropped out last April [1980]. Since then, he had been working in an optical store run by his father."

On August 11, 1980, almost a year after his story garnered national attention, Egbert, age 17, was admitted to Grandview Hospital in Dayton with a self-inflicted gunshot wound. According to The New York Times, during the five days that followed, his parents were informed that he had no chance of survival, and they "gave the hospital permission to make various organs available for transplants. The hospital used a computer network to find recipients. ... the hospital spokesman said that organs would go to patients in several states, including New Jersey." Egbert died on August 16, 1980. "The youth's death came in mid-afternoon," The New York Times continued, "but the hospital did not confirm it until 10:30 P.M. Max Peterson, a spokesman for the hospital, said that the confirmation had been delayed for notification of family members." In a book authored by Dear years later, he recalls visiting Egbert's bedside during the five days of hospitalization, and feeling horrified that a juvenile with so much intelligence was brain dead and connected to life support.

Regarding the period in the previous year when Egbert's whereabouts were unknown, The New York Times added, "The circumstances of the disappearance have never been explained, and Mr. Dear and the parents have refused to give details. Since last Monday [August 11] the parents, Anna and James Dallas Egbert 2nd, have declined to make comments of any kind."

== Legacy ==
William Dear declined to comment to journalists in 1980. In 1984, he authored the book The Dungeon Master: The Disappearance of James Dallas Egbert III, published in hardback by Houghton Mifflin and in paperback by Random House in 1985. In the book, Dear tells Egbert's story.

The idea of Dungeons & Dragons players acting out real-life sessions in dangerous locations like the steam tunnels and losing touch with reality became ingrained into the cultural consciousness, inspiring books and movies such as Mazes and Monsters. The perceived link between Egbert's disappearance and Dungeons & Dragons was one of several controversies linked to the game during the 1980s. The publicity surrounding the Mazes and Monsters novel and film heightened the public's unease regarding role-playing games. However, it also increased the sales of D&D game manuals considerably, adding to the game's success. For example, "sales of the Basic Set rose dramatically. Right before the steam tunnel incident, the Basic Set might have sold 5,000 copies a month. By the end of 1979, it was trading over 30,000 copies per month, and only going up from there".
