= The Dungeon Master =

1984 book by William Dear

The Dungeon Master: The Disappearance of James Dallas Egbert III
- Author: William Dear
- Language: English
- Subject: James Dallas Egbert III
- Publication date: 1984
- Publication place: United States
- Media type: Print

The Dungeon Master: The Disappearance of James Dallas Egbert III is a 1984 book by private investigator William Dear. It relates Dear's explanation of the 1979 "steam tunnel incident" in which James Dallas Egbert III, a student at Michigan State University, disappeared. In Dear's opinion, what occurred was misrepresented by the news media.

== Summary ==
Egbert was a 16-year-old child prodigy who was battling intense academic pressure, drug addiction, and personal issues. He had entered the school's utility tunnels with the intent of committing suicide and went into hiding after that attempt. After learning that Egbert had played Dungeons & Dragons, Dear, who was unfamiliar with the game, suggested that Egbert may have entered the tunnels to play a live-action version of the game. This theory was taken as fact by the media and caused intense controversy over the psychological effects of role playing games. After several weeks, Egbert gave himself up to Dear.

In 1980, less than a year after the incident, Egbert committed suicide by self-inflicted gunshot wound. Dear kept the true circumstances of the disappearance a secret until four years after Egbert's death, due to a promise he made to the boy not to reveal them.

== See also ==
- History of role-playing games
- Mazes and Monsters
- Media circus
- Moral panic
