= Patricia Pulling =

American anti-occultist (1948–1997)

Patricia A. Pulling
- Born: Patricia Ann Showker; June 30, 1948; Richmond, Virginia
- Died: September 18, 1997 (aged 49); Henrico, Virginia
- Occupations: Author, activist
- Spouse: Irving Lee Pulling
- Children: 5

Patricia A. Pulling (June 30, 1948 – September 18, 1997) was an anti-occult campaigner from Richmond, Virginia. She founded Bothered About Dungeons and Dragons (BADD), an advocacy group that was dedicated to the regulation of role-playing games such as Dungeons & Dragons.

== Biography ==
Pulling formed B.A.D.D. after her son Irving committed suicide by shooting himself in the chest on June 9, 1982. Irving was active in role-playing games, and she believed his suicide was directly related to the Dungeons & Dragons game. The grieving mother first filed a wrongful death lawsuit against her son's high school principal, Robert A. Bracey III, holding him as responsible for what she claimed was a D&D curse placed upon her son's character shortly before his death. She also filed suit against TSR, Inc., D&D's publishers. She appeared on an episode of 60 Minutes which also featured Gary Gygax, creator of Dungeons & Dragons, and which aired in 1985.

=== B.A.D.D. ===
Pulling founded the public advocacy group "Bothered About Dungeons & Dragons" (B.A.D.D.) in 1983 after all of her lawsuits were dismissed and began publishing information circulating her belief that D&D encouraged devil worship and suicide. B.A.D.D. described D&D as "a fantasy role-playing game which uses demonology, witchcraft, voodoo, murder, rape, blasphemy, suicide, assassination, insanity, sex perversion, homosexuality, prostitution, satanic type rituals, gambling, barbarism, cannibalism, sadism, desecration, demon summoning, necromantics, divination and other teachings."

B.A.D.D. achieved some success in airing its views in the press, both through conservative Christian media properties as well as mainstream outlets. The organization distributed its materials in Australia through conservative advocacy groups affiliated with the Reverend Fred Nile, such as the Australian Federation for Decency. In addition, Pulling obtained a private investigator's license, became a consultant to law enforcement, and was an expert witness in several gaming-related lawsuits, all of which lost in court. She became a director of the National Coalition on TV Violence in 1984.

Pulling co-authored a book, The Devil's Web: Who Is Stalking Your Children For Satan? published in August 1989. The book makes no distinction between H. P. Lovecraft's fictional Necronomicon and the Simon Necronomicon inspired by it. One portion of the book urges police officers to open interrogations of suspected teenage occultists with the question: "Have you read the Necronomicon, or are you familiar with it?"

As the popularity of Dungeons & Dragons and other role-playing games increased, Pulling's views and statements were increasingly called into question. For example, she once told a newspaper reporter that eight percent of the people living in Richmond, Virginia were Satanists. She had arrived at that figure, she explained, by estimating that four percent of the adult population and four percent of the teenage population were involved with Satanism, and added them to get eight percent. When the reporter informed her that mathematically that was four percent, not eight percent, she claimed that it did not matter because even eight percent was a "conservative" figure.

== Response ==
In 1989, game designer and novelist Michael A. Stackpole wrote Game Hysteria and the Truth, which outlined numerous misconceptions, false statements, errors of omission, methodological flaws, and other questionable practices (such as including copyrighted material in her own documents without permission) in Pulling's work on RPGs in general and D&D in particular. According to Stackpole, her statistics were flawed to the point where "if the suicide statistics for the 14 years since D&D's introduction show anything at all, gamers kill themselves at a rate that is a fraction of that of their peers." A year later, the main points of Game Hysteria and the Truth regarding Pulling were reiterated by Stackpole in The Pulling Report, a review highly critical of B.A.D.D.'s methods of data collection, analysis and reporting. Stackpole found that Pulling had given a misleading account regarding her qualifications, and after he published his report in 1990, Pulling quit B.A.D.D.

== Aftermath ==
By 1991 the American Association of Suicidology, the U.S. Centers for Disease Control, and Health and Welfare Canada all concluded that there was no causal link between fantasy gaming and suicide.

== See also ==
- Dungeons & Dragons controversies
- History of role-playing games
- Moral panic
