= Utility tunnel =

Passage carrying utility lines

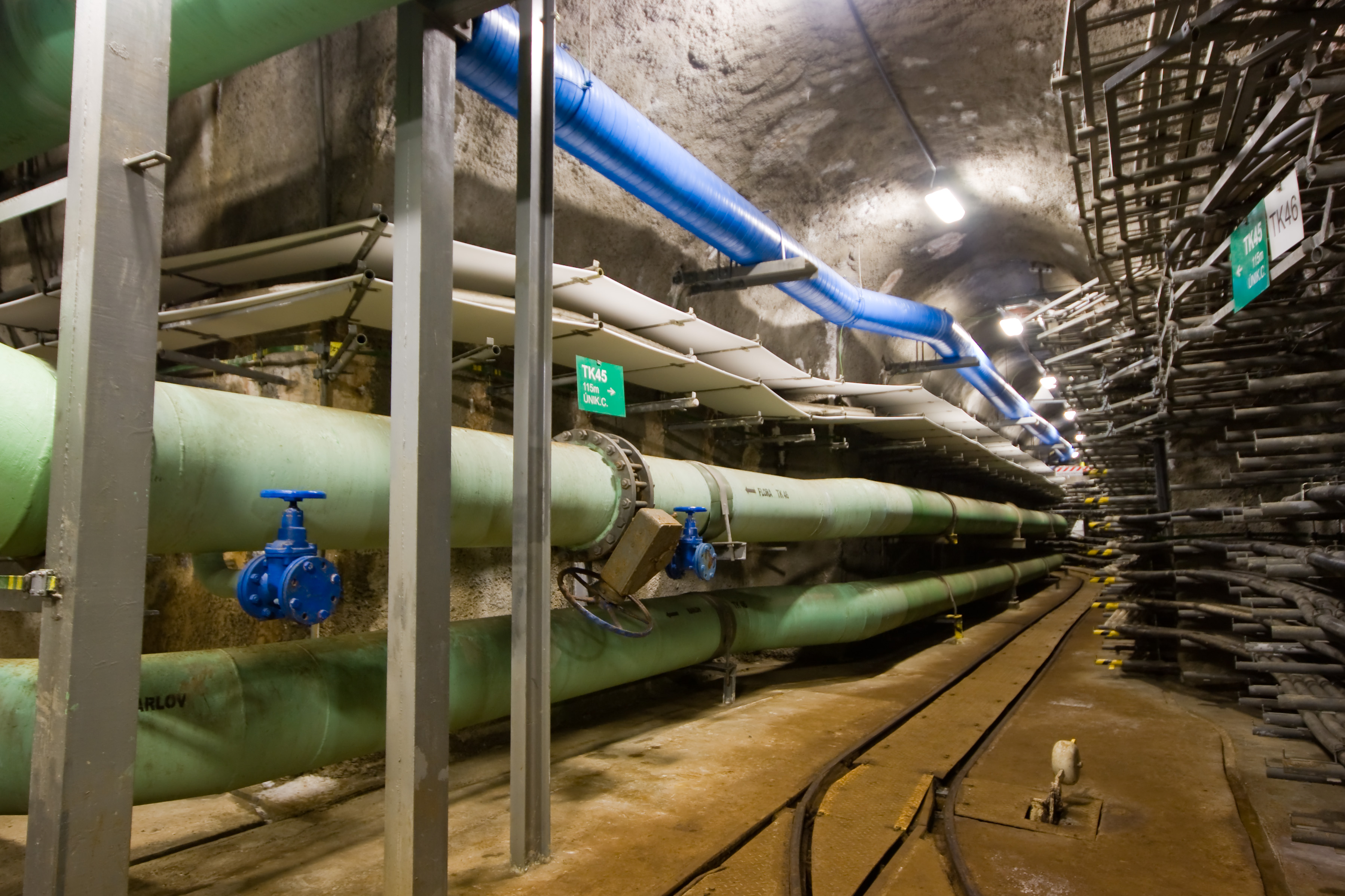
This utility tunnel in Prague is equipped with railway tracks for maintenance vehicles

A utility tunnel, utility corridor, or utilidor is a passage built underground or above ground to carry utility lines such as electricity, steam, water supply pipes, and sewer pipes. Communications utilities like fiber optics, cable television, and telephone cables are also sometimes carried. One may also be referred to as a services tunnel, services trench, services vault, or cable vault. Smaller cable containment is often referred to as a cable duct or underground conduit. Direct-buried cable (installed using trenches) is a major alternative to ducts or tunnels.

== Usage ==
Utility tunnels are common in very cold climates where direct burial below the frost line is not feasible (such as in Alaska, where the frost line is often more than 18 ft (5.5 m) below the surface, which is frozen year round). They are also built in places where the water table is too high to bury water and sewer mains, and where utility poles would be too unsightly or pose a danger (like in earthquake prone Tokyo). Tunnels are also built to avoid the disruption caused by recurring construction, repair and upgrading of cables and pipes in direct burial trenches.

Utility tunnels are also often common on large industrial, institutional, or commercial sites, where multiple large-scale services infrastructure (gas, water, power, heat, steam, compressed air, telecommunications cable, etc.) are distributed around the site to multiple buildings, without impeding vehicular or pedestrian traffic above ground. Due to the nature of these services, they may require regular inspection, repair, maintenance, or replacement, and therefore accessible utility tunnels are preferred instead of direct burying of the services in the ground.

Utility tunnels range in size from just large enough to accommodate the utility being carried, to very large tunnels that can also accommodate human and even vehicular traffic. They may also attract urban explorers, who enjoy investigating hidden complex networks of spaces.

== Industrial, institutional, and municipal environments ==
Utility tunnels are often installed in large industrial plants, as well as large institutions, such as universities, hospitals, research labs, and other facilities managed in common. Shared facilities, such as district heating, use superheated steam pipes routed through utility tunnels. On some university campuses, such as the Massachusetts Institute of Technology, many of the buildings are connected via large underground passages to allow easy movement of people and equipment.

Some municipalities, such as Prague in the Czech Republic, have installed extensive underground utility tunnels, to allow installation and maintenance of utility lines and equipment without disrupting the historic streets above.

== At Walt Disney World ==
Some of the largest and most famous utility tunnels are at Disney theme parks. They were first built for Walt Disney World's Magic Kingdom in Florida. Smaller utilidor systems are built under the central section of Epcot's Future World, primarily beneath Spaceship Earth and Innoventions, and formerly at Pleasure Island. Disneyland also has a small utilidor through Tomorrowland. The utilidors are a part of Disney's "backstage" (behind-the-scenes) area. They allow Disney employees ("cast members") to perform park support operations, such as trash removal, out of the sight of guests.

== Arctic towns ==
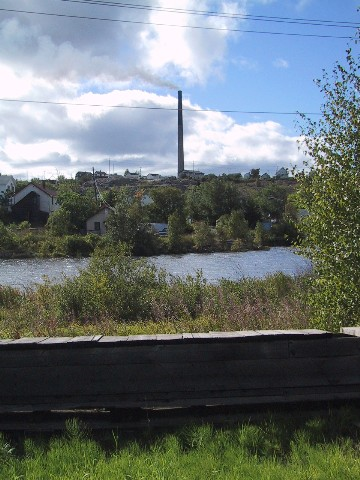
Flin Flon (in Manitoba, Canada) is built on rock, making excavation costly. The utilidor in the foreground carries municipal sewer and water services and protects piping from freezing in the winter.

Utilidors are above-ground enclosed utility conduits that are used in larger communities in the northern polar region where permafrost does not allow the normal practice of burying water and sewer pipes underground. They can in particular be found in Inuvik, Northwest Territories and Iqaluit, Nunavut. Not all older homes are connected, and these must rely on trucks to deliver water and remove sewage. Most homes in rural Alaska (off the road system) are not equipped with plumbing and require fresh water and waste to be transported by personal vehicle such as snowmobile or four-wheeler ATV. Villages with utilidors are considered more advanced.

Utilidors may also be used to carry fuel lines, such as natural gas. They are not normally used to carry wiring for electric, telephone, and television service, which are usually suspended from poles.

== Comparison with direct burial of utilities ==
The advantages of utility tunnels are the reduction of maintenance manholes, one-time relocation, and less excavation and repair, compared to separate cable ducts for each service. When they are well mapped, they also allow rapid access to all utilities without having to dig access trenches or resort to confused and often inaccurate utility maps.

The following table compares the features of utility networks in single purpose buried trenches vs. the features of common ducts or tunnels:

Utility tunnels	Direct burial
Higher initial capital cost for construction of tunnels	Cheaper initial capital cost of burying individual infrastructure
Easy location of infrastructure	Difficult location of infrastructure
Fast maintenance and replacement	Slow maintenance and replacement
Less roadworks and traffic as maintenance can be done without disruption of traffic	Increased roadworks and traffic
Reduced manholes on roads. Single manhole for all infrastructure	Large numbers of manholes for various infrastructure types
Easy to coordinate between different infrastructure	Hard to coordinate projects between infrastructure providers
Easy access for maintenance, upgrades and expansion of infrastructure	Huge labour costs for regular re-burial
Shared initial capital costs between infrastructure providers (ie, water, gas, electric)	Risk of damage to co-located infrastructure (eg: pipes, wiring & cables)
Low thermal conductivity of air in tunnels allows heat transmission with less insulation and cheaper standoffs	

== Examples ==
Many examples of utility tunnels are found in Japan, where government officials have sought ways to reduce the catastrophic effects of earthquakes in their tectonically active country. Their use, however, is not limited to that country, and there are many examples of such utility tunnels. These include:

- Incorporated with Xinyi and Sonshan MRT rapid transit lines in Taipei, Taiwan.
- Azabu-Hibiya Common Utility Duct in Tokyo, Japan
- Minatomirai District lines in Yokohama, Japan
- Portions of the Chicago Tunnel Company's abandoned network of tunnels are leased to utility companies for use as common utility ducts for electrical, communication and HVAC lines. The tunnels lie approximately forty feet below the street surface and run under all streets in the central business district, except where they were displaced by rapid transit tunnels.
- Poundbury in Dorset, England, a planned community built on land belonging to King Charles as Duke of Cornwall, incorporates common utility ducts.
- The Dartford Cable Tunnel allows high voltage electricity line to cross the River Thames.
- The Utility Tunnels in Qatar built on the Lusail, 15 km north of Doha, is approximately 14–15 km in length.
- The old Beacon Hill Tunnel in New Kowloon, Hong Kong, a disused railway tunnel which now carries a towngas pipeline
- Tunnels of Hongkong Electric
- Utility Tunnel in GIFT City, Gandhinagar, India

== Gallery ==
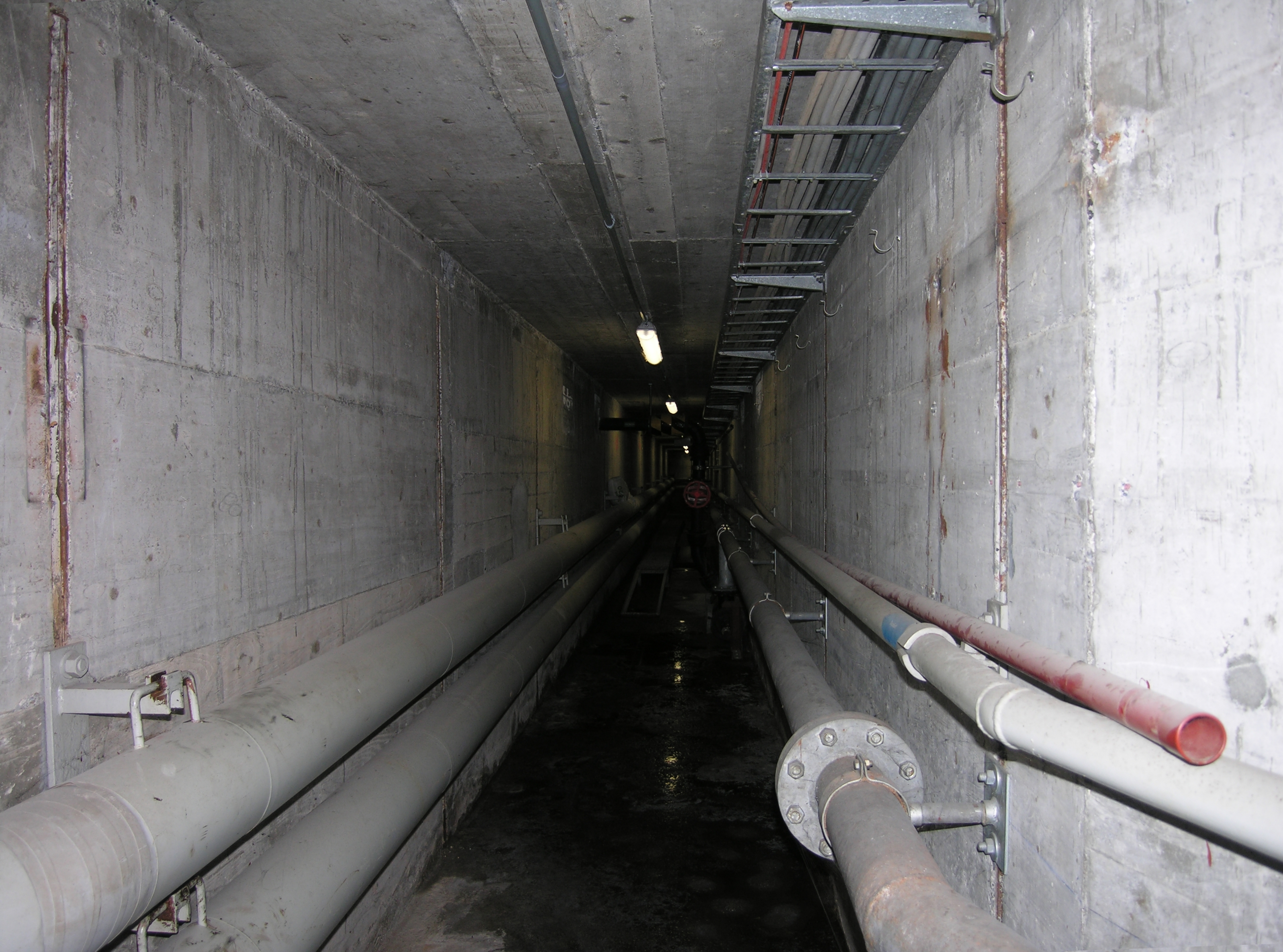
Stark utility tunnel in Zurich, Switzerland

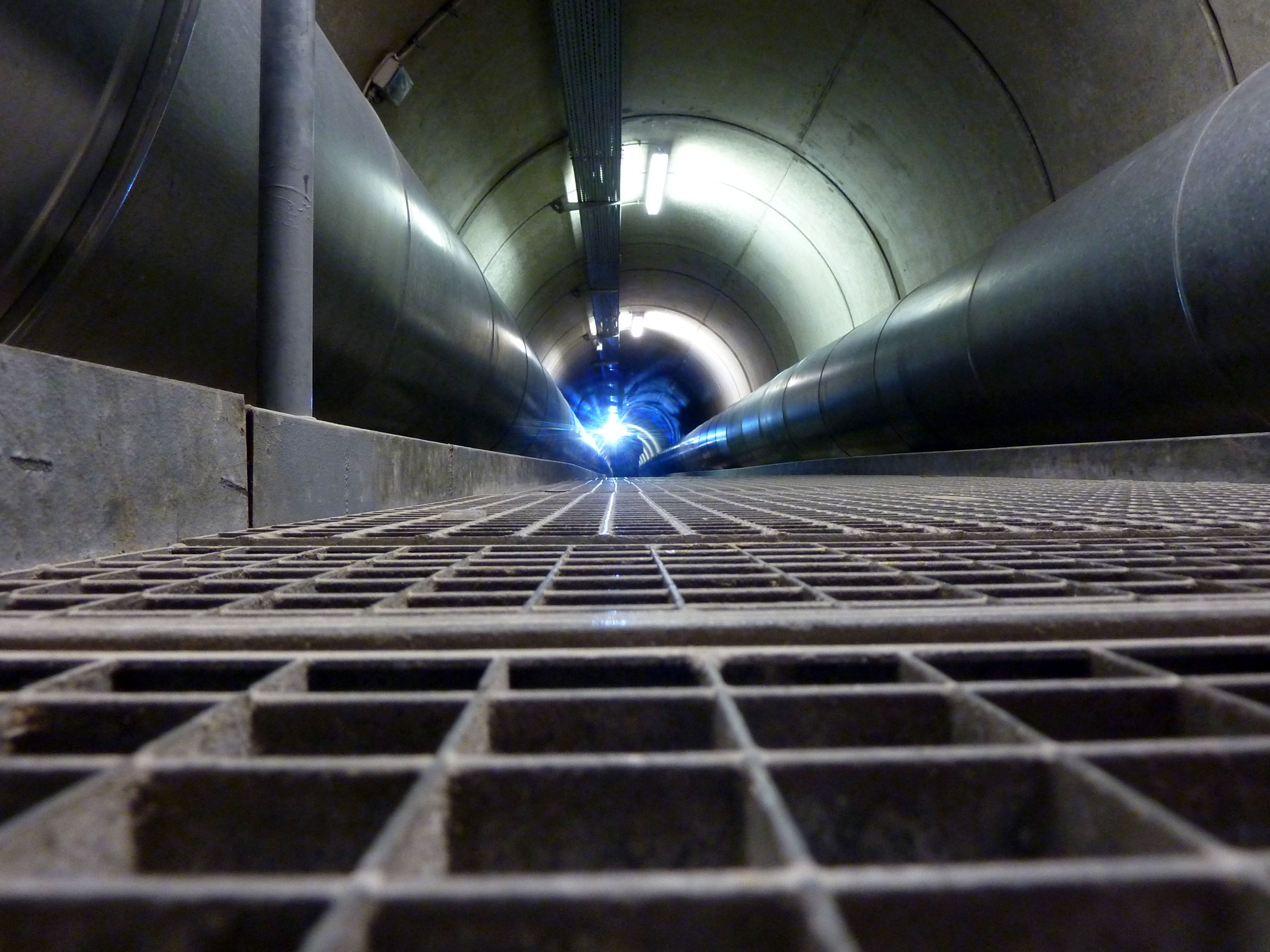
District heating tunnel beneath the Rhein River in Cologne, Germany

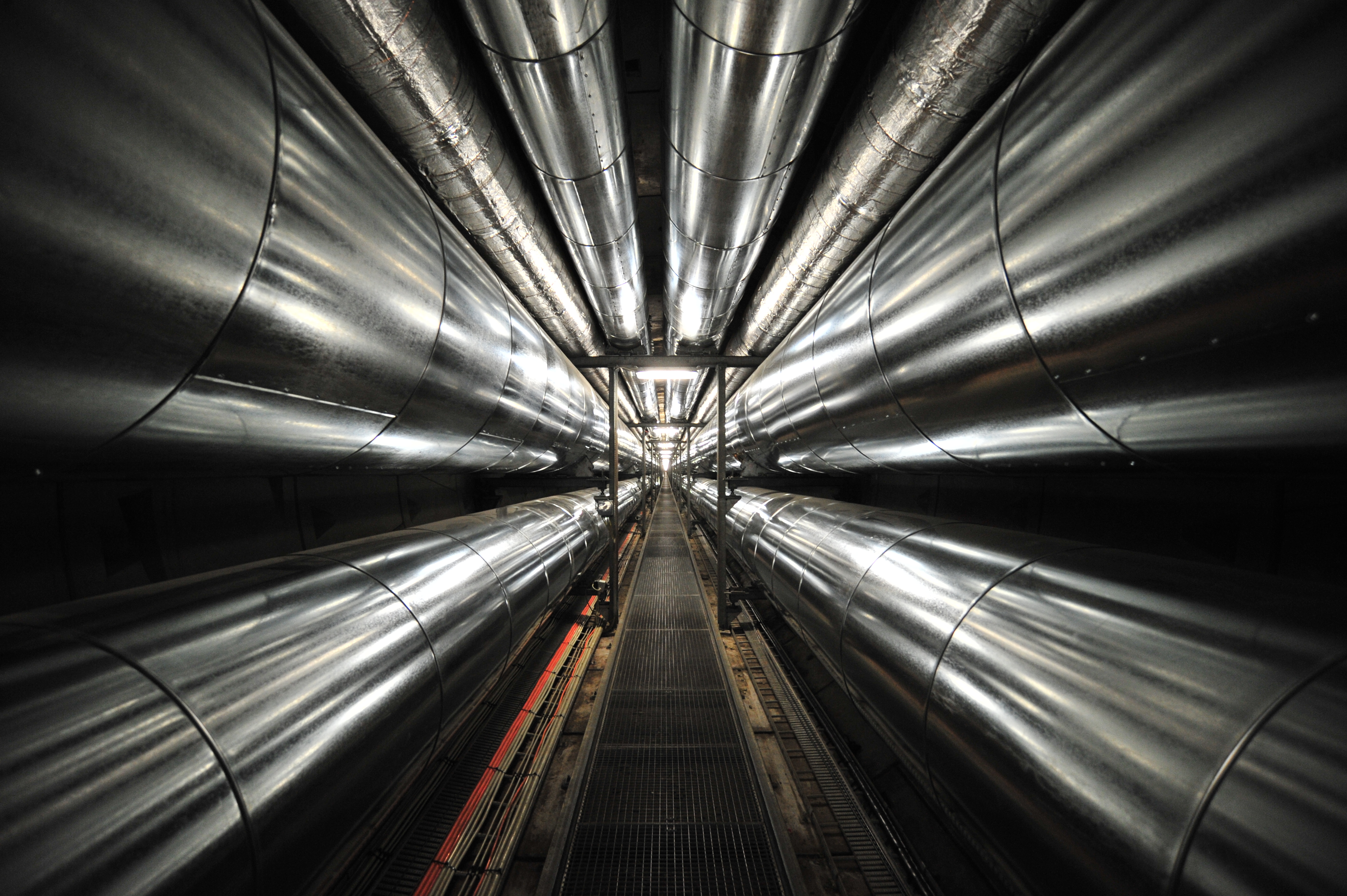
District heating tunnel in Copenhagen, Denmark

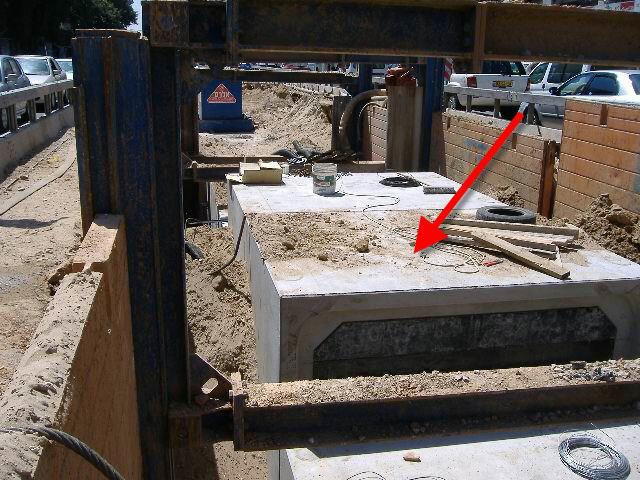
Red arrow marks a prefabricated element of a utility tunnel already placed in the trench

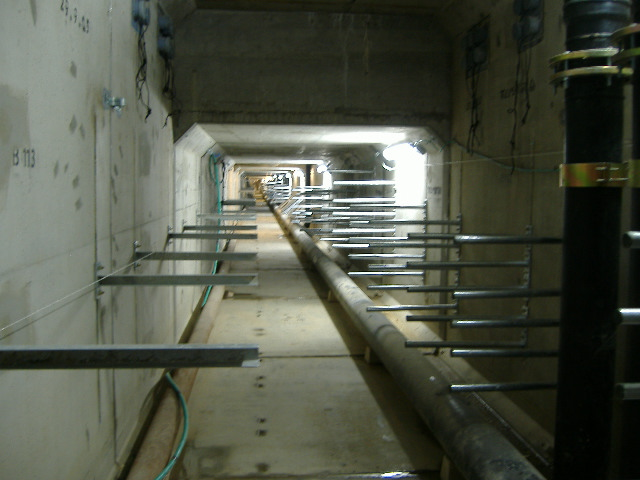
A newly built utility tunnel in Haifa, Israel

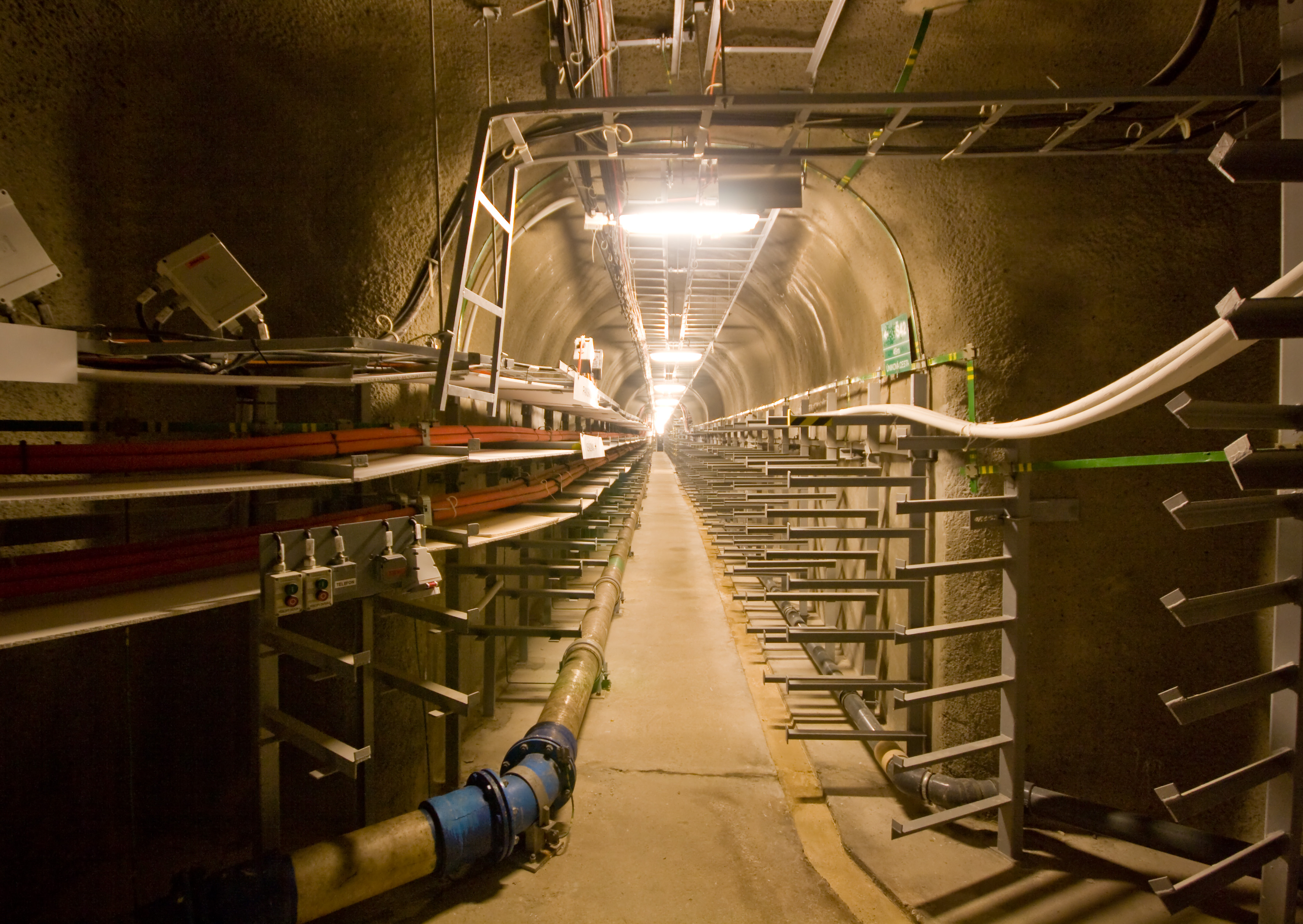
Tunnel in Prague is shared by pipes and cables

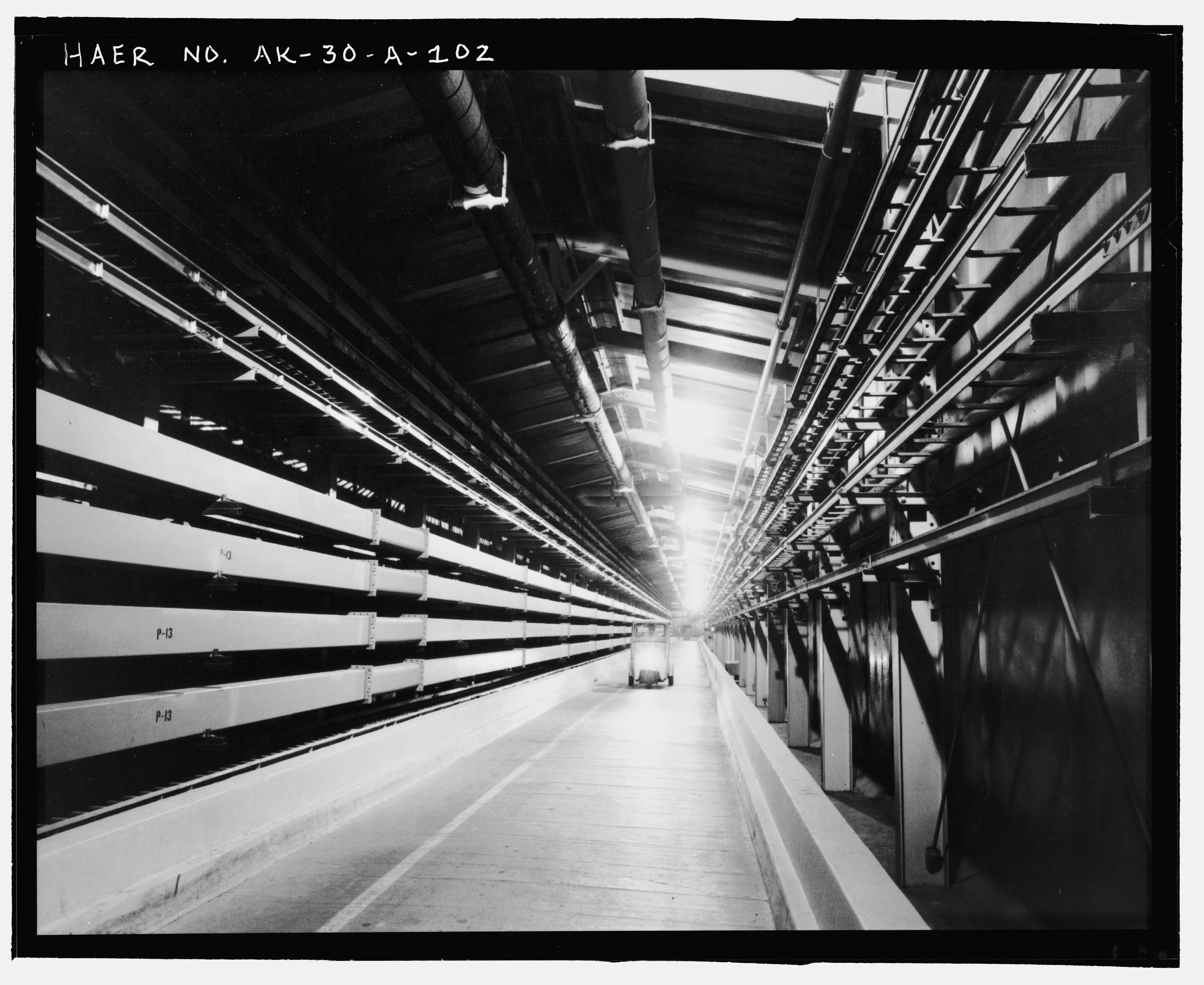
Utility passageway between two buildings of a Ballistic Missile Early Warning System site in Alaska.

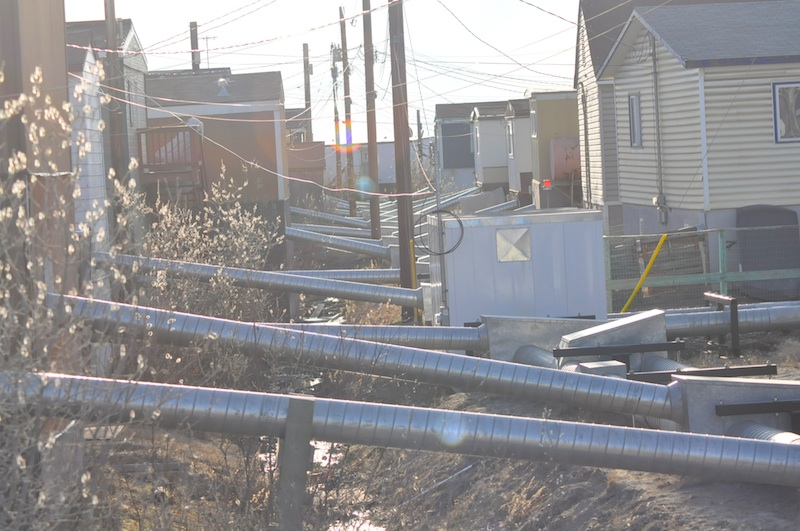
Utilidors connecting houses in Inuvik, Northwest Territories, Canada

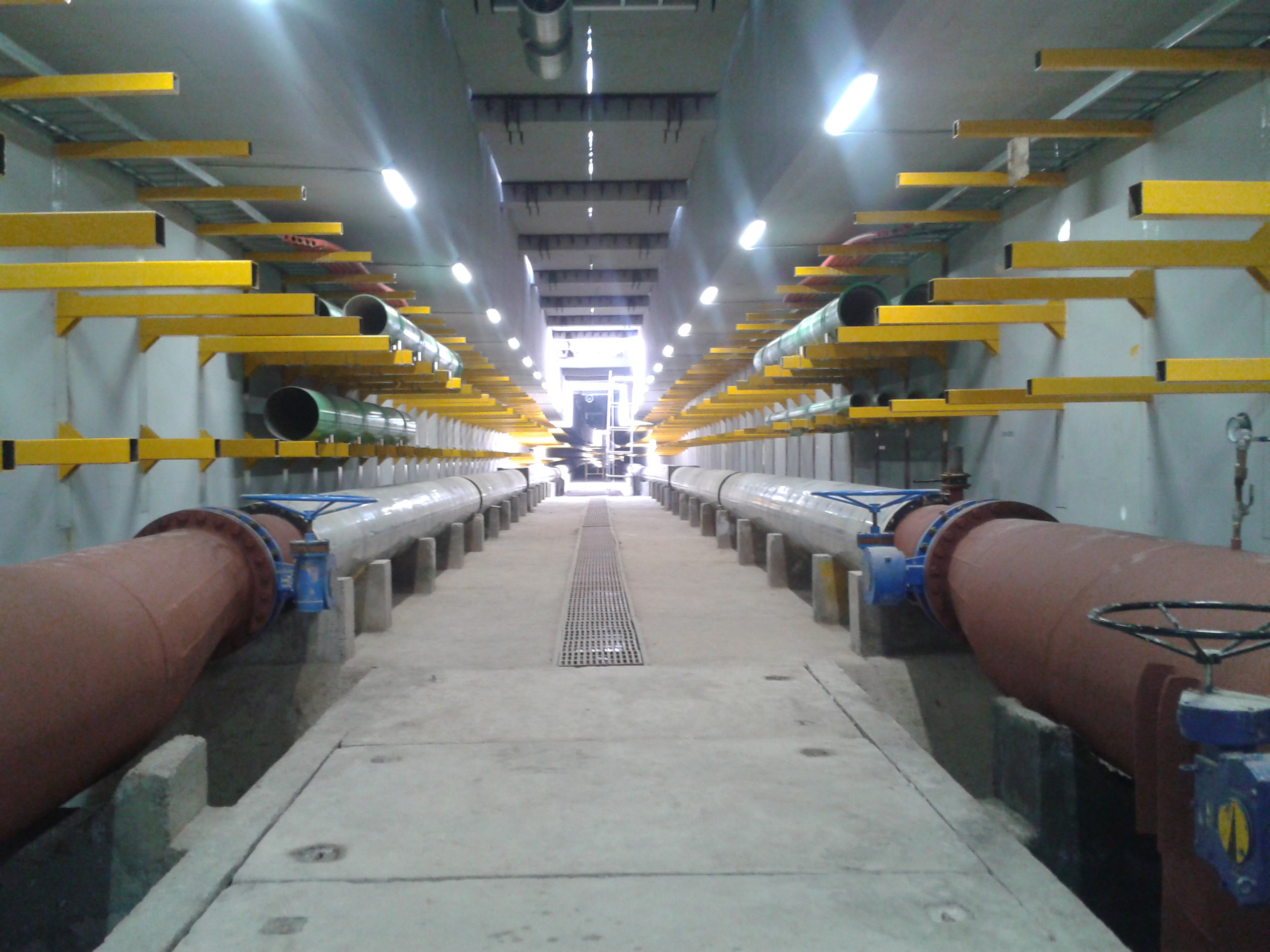
Utility Tunnel in GIFT City Gandhinagar, India

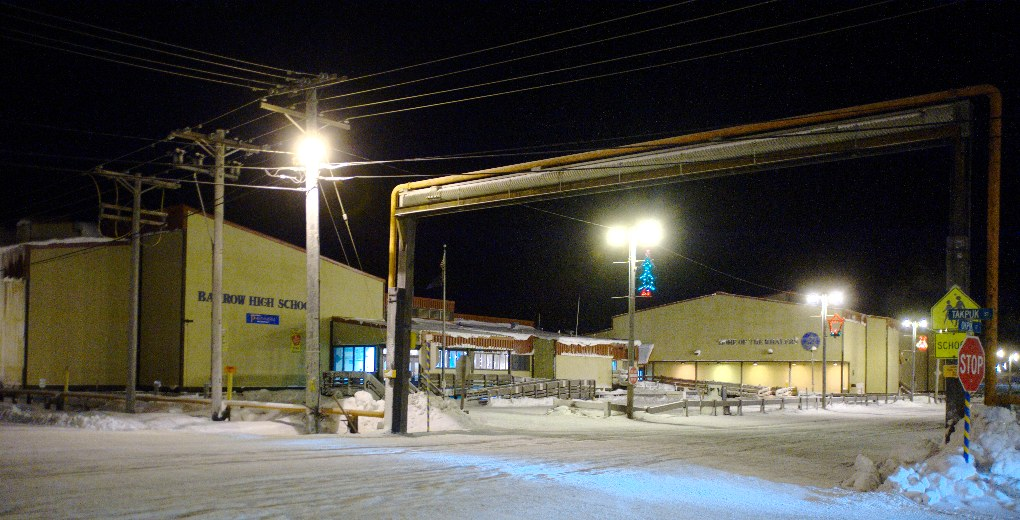
A utilidor system is used in Utqiaġvik, Alaska due to extensive permafrost underlying the city. At right foreground is a portion of the utilidor crossing Okpik Street overhead, adjacent to Barrow High School.

== See also ==
- Dartford Cable Tunnel
- Raised floor
- Tunnel
- Underground city
- Utility vault
- Wayfinding (urban or indoor)
