= List of Peabody Award winners (1960–1969) =

Peabody Award winners and honorable mentions.

== 1960s ==
=== 1960 ===
Recipient	Area of Excellence
NBC	Award for the White Paper series of news specials, produced by Irving Gitlin and covering such topics as the U-2 incident and the sit-in demonstrations
NBC	The Shari Lewis Show
NBC	The Texaco Huntley-Brinkley Report
CBS	Award for coverage of the 1960 Winter and Summer Olympics, the first aired on television
CBS	CBS Reports, for Harvest of Shame
CBS	G.E. College Bowl
CBS	The Fabulous Fifties, a revue produced by Leland Hayward
Dr. Frank Stanton (CBS)	Personal Award for Dr. Stanton's actions that led to the 1960 presidential debates
Broadcasting and Film Commission of the National Council of Churches of Christ in the U.S.	Institutional Award for the programs Look Up and Live (CBS-TV), Frontiers of Faith (an anthology program on NBC-TV), Pilgrimage (ABC Radio, with sermons by John Sutherland Bonnell), and Talk-back (syndicated, produced by the Methodist Church)
KPFK Radio/Los Angeles, CA	Institutional Award for the station's local programming, including Arming to Parley, The Largest Question, Not Merely a Business, and its children's programming
WCCO-TV/Minneapolis, MN	Institutional Award for the station's locally produced programming, including Unwed Mothers (produced by Carl Ruble), Sister Kenny Scandal (about a fundraising scandal at Sister Kenny Institute reported by Joe Bartelme), and Arle Haeberle’s Capsule Fashion Course (a training for women at the Anoka State Hospital)
WCKT-TV/Miami, FL	Institutional Award for the station's locally produced programming on the consolidation of the Cuban Revolution, including Compass Points South, Cuba On The Move, and Leave Or Stay (about the Guantanamo Bay Naval Base), all narrated by Wayne Fariss and produced by Gene Strul
WOOD Radio and WOOD-TV/Grand Rapids, MI	Institutional Award for the station's locally produced programming, including Wasted World (on the condition of homeless men), Red China-Awakening Giant and MRA-The Plan To Change The World
Texaco-Metropolitan Opera Radio Network	Institutional Award for the Metropolitan Opera radio broadcasts
WQXR/New York, NY	Musical Spectaculars
Irene Wicker (WNYC/New York, NY)	Personal Award for Wicker's work on the children's radio program The Singing Lady

=== 1961 ===
Recipient	Area of Excellence
WNYC/New York, NY	The Reader's Almanac (hosted by Warren Bower) and Teen Age Book Talk (produced by Lillian Okun)
BBC Television	An Age of Kings, with recognition to National Educational Television, Metropolitan Broadcasting, individual stations, Standard Oil Company of New Jersey, and Humble Oil
NBC	David Brinkley's Journal, a news show hosted by David Brinkley and produced by Ted Yates
NBC	The Bob Newhart Show
NBC	Vincent Van Gogh: A Self-Portrait, narrated by Martin Gabel with Lee J. Cobb as Van Gogh and produced by Lou Hazam
ABC	Expedition!
Capital Cities Broadcasting Corporation (ABC)	Award for coverage of the trial of Adolf Eichmann and its summary documentary Verdict for Tomorrow: The Eichmann Trial on Television (Milton Fruchtman, executive producer)
CBS and Walter Lippman	Institutional Award for television contribution to international understanding, for an interview of Lippman by Howard K. Smith on CBS Reports
Fred W. Friendly (CBS)	Personal Award for Friendly's work in television journalism
WFMT/Chicago, IL	Institutional Award for fine arts entertainment, including concerts from the Fine Arts Quartet, Boston Symphony Orchestra, and the Philadelphia Orchestra (Norman Pellegrini, program director)
WRUL (Worldwide Broadcasting)/New York, NY	Institutional Award for contribution to international understanding for the station's coverage (in English and Spanish) of the United Nations' General Assembly proceedings, sponsored by American Machine and Foundry
KSL-TV/Salt Lake City, UT	Let Freedom Ring, featuring the Mormon Tabernacle Choir, starring Richard Boone, Laraine Day, Howard Keel, and Dan O'Herlihy, narrated by Richard L. Evans, and produced by Michel M. Grilikhes
Newton N. Minow	Personal Award to the chairman of the Federal Communications Commission

=== 1962 ===
Recipient	Area of Excellence
CBS	A Tour of the White House with Mrs. John F. Kennedy
Carol Burnett (CBS)	Personal Award for Burnett's comedic performances
Walter Cronkite (CBS News)	Personal Award for Cronkite's work on the nightly news, The Twentieth Century, CBS Reports, and specials such as Our Next Man In Space
ABC	Adlai Stevenson Reports
WJR/Detroit, MI	Adventures in Good Music
Official Films Inc.	Biography
WNDT/New York, NY	Books for Our Time, hosted by August Heckscher II
WMAQ/Chicago, IL	Carnival of Books, hosted by Ruth Harshaw
NBC	The DuPont Show of the Week
NBC	Exploring
NBC	Walt Disney's Wonderful World of Color
NBC Radio Network	The Eternal Light
William R. McAndrew (NBC News)	Personal Award for McAndrew's "vision and leadership" as NBC News' Executive VP
WGBH-TV/Boston, MA	Elliot Norton Reviews, hosted by Elliot Norton
Television Information Office and National Association of Broadcasters	Institutional Award for the organizations' study of locally produced children's programming which resulted in the book For the Young Viewer: Television Programming for Children… at the Local Level
WQXR/New York, NY	Institutional Award for the station's news presentations in the midst of the New York City newspaper strike
KPIX-TV/San Francisco, CA	San Francisco Pageant, a series of historical documentaries profiling the city of San Francisco
KNX/Los Angeles, CA	Science Editor, narrated by Hale Sparks and produced by the University of California Extension

=== 1963 ===
Recipient	Area of Excellence
Broadcasting industry of the United States	Award for coverage of the John F. Kennedy assassination and related events
WLW/Cincinnati, OH	Government Under Law
KSTP/St Paul, MN	Open Line, for its promotion of public discussion on important issues, in particular claims of subversives at the University of Minnesota (produced by Lee Vogel)
NBC	American Revolution '63
NBC	Mr. Novak
NBC Radio	The Sunday Night Monitor
WNBC-TV/New York, NY and NBC Radio	The Dorothy Gordon Forum
CBS	CBS Reports, for the 3-part report "Storm Over the Supreme Court", narrated by Eric Sevareid
CBS	The Danny Kaye Show
CBS and Dr. Frank Stanton	Town Meeting of the World
Eric Sevareid (CBS News)	Personal Award for Sevareid's editorial commentaries
Voice of America and Edward R. Murrow	Institutional Award to VOA and Murrow, its former director, for its contributions "to deepened international understanding"
ABC	Saga of Western Man
WGN-TV/Chicago, IL	Treetop House, a children's show hosted by Anita Klever

=== 1964 ===
Recipient	Area of Excellence
Networks and the broadcasting industry	Award for "inescapably confronting the American public with the realities of racial discontent"
CBS	CBS Reports, highlighting an interview with Walter Lippmann
Intertel (Council of the International Television Federation)	Institutional Award for a group consisting of Australian Broadcasting Corporation, the Canadian Broadcasting Corporation, Rediffusion TV, the Westinghouse Broadcasting Company and National Educational Television for documentaries that provided a contribution to international understanding
WBKB-TV/Chicago, IL	Off the Cuff, a talk show hosted by Norman Ross
Burr Tillstrom	Personal Award for Tillstrom's "hand ballet" interpretation of the Berlin Wall's human impact for That Was The Week That Was
Julia Child (WGBH-TV/Boston, MA)	Personal Award for Child's work on The French Chef
William H. Lawrence (ABC)	Personal Award for Lawrence's reporting, analysis, and commentary work
NBC	The Louvre, produced by Lucy Jarvis and narrated by Charles Boyer
NBC and Robert Saudek	Profile in Courage
Joyce Hall (NBC)	Personal Award for Hall's work as "an enlightened patron of the television arts" through Hallmark Hall of Fame
WRVR-FM/New York, NY	Riverside Radio

=== 1965 ===
Recipient	Area of Excellence
CBS	A Charlie Brown Christmas
CBS	CBS Reports, for the report "KKK - The Invisible Empire", produced by David Lowe
CBS	The Mystery of Stonehenge (produced by Harry Morgan)
CBS	National Drivers Test
CBS Radio	Music 'Til Dawn
CBS and NBC	Joint Institutional Award for the specials My Name Is Barbra (CBS), The Julie Andrews Show (NBC), and Frank Sinatra: A Man and His Music (NBC)
ABC	A Visit to Washington with Mrs. Lyndon B. Johnson, On Behalf of a More Beautiful America (produced by John H. Secondari and Helen Rogers and directed by Harry Rasky and John Hughes)
KTLA/Los Angeles, CA	Institutional Award for the station's coverage of the Watts riots
National Educational Television	Institutional Award for the network's "distinguished performance in educational broadcasting," specifically citing History of the Negro People (produced by Arthur W. Rabin), American Crises, and Changing World: South African Essay (directed by Terence Macartney-Filgate)
WCCO Radio/Minneapolis, MN	Institutional Award for the station's public service coverage during natural disasters
Xerox Corporation	Institutional Award for its promoting of "international understanding" through presentations of "The Making of the President - 1964 (directed by Mel Stuart), Let My People Go, The Louvre (produced by Lucy Jarvis), and the illuminating series on the United Nations"
Elmo Ellis (WSB Radio/Atlanta, GA)	Personal Award for Ellis' editorials, book reviews, and other features for WSB
Frank McGee (NBC)	Personal Award for McGee's special event news coverage, such as spaceflights and the visit by Pope Paul VI to the United States
Morley Safer (CBS News)	Personal Award for Safer's reports from the Vietnam War

=== 1966 ===
Recipient	Area of Excellence
ABC	A Christmas Memory
ABC	The Wide World of Sports
WTMJ-TV/Milwaukee, WI	A Polish Millennium Concert, celebrating 1000 years of Christianity in Poland
NBC	American White Paper: Organized Crime in the United States, produced by Fred Freed
NBC	The Bell Telephone Hour
NBC	Siberia: A Day in Irkutsk, produced by George A. Vicas and hosted by Kenneth Bernstein
NBC	The World of Stuart Little
WNBC-TV/New York, NY and NBC Radio	The Dorothy Gordon Youth Forum, for "Youth and Narcotics - Who Has the Answer?"
WBKB-TV/Chicago, IL	Kup's Show, for its presentation on the dangers of narcotics
WGN-TV/Chicago, IL	Artists' Showcase, a local classical music show hosted by Louis Sudler and with a band led by Robert Trendler
KRON-TV/San Francisco, CA	Assignment Four, a local documentary series
CBS	National Geographic Specials, including Hidden World (directed by Jack Haley Jr.), Americans on Everest, Dr. Leakey and the Dawn of Man (about Louis Leakey and directed by Guy Blanchard), The World of Jacques-Yves Cousteau (directed by Philippe Cousteau), The Voyage of the Brigantine Yankee (directed by Ray Jewell), and Miss Goodall and the Wild Chimpanzees (about Jane Goodall and directed by Marshall Flaum)
Tom H. John (CBS)	Personal Award for John's art and set design on the CBS specials Color Me Barbra, Death of a Salesman, and The Strollin' Twenties
CBS News	CBS Reports, for "The Poisoned Air" (narrated by Daniel Schorr and produced by Jack Beck)
Harry Reasoner (CBS News)	Personal Award for Reasoner's reportage and essay presentations, with producer Andrew Rooney
WLIB/New York, NY	Community Opinion, a program that provided platforms for and information to residents of New York's Harlem neighborhood (produced by Sam Chase)
National Educational Television	Institutional Award for excellence in educational television programming, citing NET Playhouse, NET Journal, and U.S.A.: The Arts
Edwin Newman (NBC Radio Network)	Personal Award for Newman's commentary work

=== 1967 ===
Recipient	Area of Excellence
ABC	Africa, a four-hour documentary on the continent (James Fleming, executive producer)
NBC	An Evening at Tanglewood (hosted by Edwin Newman and produced by Walter C. Miller)
NBC	Meet the Press
NBC Radio	The Eternal Light
NBC Radio and Elie Abel	The World and Washington, a news analysis show
CBS	CBS Playhouse
CBS	CBS Children's Film Festival
CBS	The Ed Sullivan Show, in recognition of its 20 years of "presenting a broad spectrum of entertainment"
Eric Sevareid (CBS News)	Personal Award for Sevareid's news analysis and commentary
WIS-TV/Columbia, SC	Mr. Knozit, a local children's television program with Joe Pinner
Bob Hope	Personal Award in honor of Hope's 30th anniversary in broadcast entertainment
Dr. James R. Killian, Jr.	Personal Award to the chairman of the Carnegie Commission on Educational Television, whose recommendations led to the creation of the Corporation for Public Broadcasting
WBBM-TV/Chicago, IL	The Opportunity Line, a series promoting employment opportunities in the Chicago area

=== 1968 ===
Recipient	Area of Excellence
ABC	Award for coverage of the 1968 Winter and Summer Olympics, highlighting the work of Roone Arledge and Chris Schenkel
ABC	Institutional Award for its presentation of The Sense of Wonder (based on the book by Rachel Carson and produced by Jules Power), How Life Begins (a sex education film produced by Power), Sharks: The Undersea World of Jacques Cousteau, The Road to Gettysburg, Hemingway's Spain (produced by Lester Cooper), and The Secret of Michelangelo: Every Man’s Dream (produced by Milton Fruchtman), documentaries with "exceptional inventiveness"
CBS News	CBS Reports: Hunger in America (reported by Charles Kuralt and David Culhane and produced by Martin Carr)
WJR/Detroit, MI	Kaleidoscope, hosted by Mike Whorf
National Educational Television	Mister Rogers' Neighborhood
National Educational Television	Playhouse
Westinghouse Broadcasting Company, Inc.	One Nation Indivisible (hosted by Roderick MacLeish)
Charles Kuralt	Personal Award for Kuralt's work on CBS News' On the Road
Dr. Leonard Reiffel (WEEI/Boston, MA)	Personal Award for Dr Reiffel's work on WEEI's The World Tomorrow
Robert Cromie and WTTW-TV/Chicago, IL	Book Beat
NBC Radio	Second Sunday
WQXR/New York, NY	Steinway Hall

=== 1969 ===
Recipient	Area of Excellence
NBC	NBC Experiment in Television
NBC	Who Killed Lake Erie?, produced by Fred Freed
NBC Radio Network	"On Trial: The Man in the Middle," an episode of Second Sunday
WLIB/New York, NY	Higher Horizons, a show about how to apply for college, produced by Sam Chase
Voice of America	Institutional Award for "promotion of international understanding"
CBS	J.T. (from the CBS Children's Hour)
CBS	The Japanese, narrated by Edwin O. Reischauer and produced by Igor Oganesoff
KQED/San Francisco, CA	Newsroom
Bing Crosby	Personal Award in recognition of Crosby's entertainment career
Chet Huntley	Personal Award for Huntley's "major and always dependable contribution to radio and television for over 35 years"
Curt Gowdy	Personal Award to "television's most versatile sportscaster"
Frank Reynolds	Personal Award for Reynolds' anchor and commentary work on ABC Evening News
Tom Pettit	Personal Award for Pettit's investigative reportage for NBC News
National Educational Television	Sesame Street
WGBH-TV/Boston, MA and KCET/Los Angeles, CA (airing on National Educational Television)	The Advocates
WFBM-TV/Indianapolis, IN	The Negro in Indianapolis, a series of programs examining and promoting race relations in the city (produced by Jim Hetherington and narrated by Howard Caldwell)
WRNG/Atlanta, GA	When Will It End?, a story about police brutality reported by Mickie Silverstein and Teddi Levison.
