= Three Coins in the Fountain =

Three Coins in the Fountain may refer to:

- Three Coins in the Fountain (film)
- "Three Coins in the Fountain" (song), sung in the above film

== See also ==
- Coins in the Fountain, a 1990 remake of the 1954 film
- Coins in the Fountain (novel), the inspiration for the film
- Trevi Fountain, part of the inspiration for the novel
