= The Best of Everything =

The Best of Everything may refer to:

- The Best of Everything (novel), a novel by Rona Jaffe
- The Best of Everything (film), a 1959 romantic drama film, based on the novel
- The Best of Everything (TV series), an American daytime soap opera, based on the film
- "The Best of Everything" (song), a 1959 song by Johnny Mathis from the film
- "The Best of Everything", a song by Tom Petty and the Heartbreakers from the album Southern Accents
- The Best of Everything (album), a greatest hits album by Tom Petty
