= Mann Rubin =

American novelist and screenwriter (1927–2013)

Mann Rubin (December 11, 1927 – October 12, 2013) was an American film and television screenwriter, whose credits included The Best of Everything in 1959, Brainstorm in 1965, Warning Shot in 1967, The First Deadly Sin in 1980, and The Human Shield in 1991. He also taught screenwriting within the cinema and TV department at the University of Southern California for more than ten years.

== Early life ==
Rubin was born in Brooklyn, New York. He served in the United States Army from 1945 until 1947 before completing his Bachelor of Arts degree at New York University in 1952.

== Career ==
He initially worked as a science fiction writer for DC Comics. His writing credits at DC Comics included Mystery in Space and Strange Adventures. Rubin later published stories in Alfred Hitchcock's Mystery Magazine. He would later pen the screenplay for an episode of The Alfred Hitchcock Hour.

Rubin penned scripts for dozens of television series between the 1950s and 1990s. His work in television began in the late 1940s with the CBS anthology series, Studio One in Hollywood, and Tales of Tomorrow, which aired on ABC. His numerous television credits included episodes of Dynasty, The F.B.I., The Feather and Father Gang, The Fugitive, Mannix, Mission: Impossible, The Mod Squad, Perry Mason, Quincy, M.E., The Rockford Files, The Six Million Dollar Man, and Starsky & Hutch. His later television series was the short-lived reboot of Dragnet in 1990.

Rubin was also active in feature film. Rubin and Edith Sommer co-wrote the 1959 Jean Negulesco film, The Best of Everything, which they adapted from the 1958 novel of the same name by Rona Jaffe. Rubin also adapted the 1980 film, The First Deadly Sin, from a novel by Lawrence Sanders. The First Deadly Sin, which starred Frank Sinatra and Faye Dunaway, marked Sinatra's last major film role.

In more recent years, Rubin wrote the scripts for two short films. He co-wrote A Nice Touch, a 2012 short directed by Richard Jones, which starred Scottish actor, Dougray Scott. Rubin's last short film, A Lasting Impression, which stars Tanna Frederick, will debut at various film festivals in 2014.

== Death ==
Mann Rubin died of a long illness on October 12, 2013, in West Hills, California, at the age of 85.
