= Open Hearing =

Open Hearing may refer to:

- Open Hearing (American TV program), news-related discussion show seen in 1954 and 1957–58
- Open Hearing (Australian TV program), topical subjects panel discussion show seen in 1960–61
