= Adele Palmer =

American film costume designer (1915–2008)

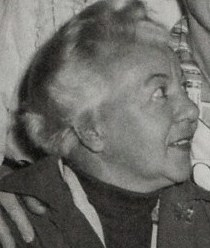
- Born: October 21, 1915; Santa Ana, California, US
- Died: July 1, 2008 (aged 92); Santa Barbara, California, US
- Other name: Adele
- Occupation: Costume Designer
- Years active: 1934–1975
- Spouse: Thomas P. Wilder (1949–2002) (his death)

Adele Palmer (October 21, 1915 – July 1, 2008) was an American costume designer who worked on more than 300 films during her long career. She was nominated for one Oscar. This was for the film The Best of Everything, in the category of Best Costumes-Color during the 32nd Academy Awards.
