= Laurie O'Brien =

American actress

- Born: 1950 or 1951 (age 75–76); Denver, Colorado, U.S.
- Education: University of Colorado Boulder (BA, MA)
- Occupations: Actress; playwright; psychologist
- Years active: 1982–present (actress)

Laurie O'Brien (born 1950 or 1951) is an American actress, playwright, and former psychologist. She is best known for voicing Baby Piggy on the Saturday morning cartoon Jim Henson's Muppet Babies and the CTW animated series Cro as Ivana.

== Early years ==
Born in Denver, Colorado, O'Brien paid her way for attending the University of Colorado Boulder (UC) by working in a juvenile detention center, in a mental hospital, and with asthmatic children at the National Jewish Hospital in Denver. O'Brien developed a program of bibliotherapy by teaching asthmatic children while reading aloud with them. She also taught theater to people with schizophrenia and worked with unwed mothers, as well as people addicted to drugs, having "deeply psychotic" symptoms and profound hearing loss, and being diagnosed with bipolar disorder and autism.

Taking all theater courses she could attend, O'Brien graduated with a bachelor's degree in psychology. Because she was not able to transition to a double major, she returned to the university in the mid-1970s and graduated with an interdisciplinary master's degree in theater, although they were fashioned from courses in literature, psychology, and theater. She described the combination of courses as "Reader's Theater".

Prior to moving to Los Angeles, O'Brien started to suffer depression from work and wanted a professional career as an actress. She left the job sometime in late 1980 and moved to Los Angeles in November 1980. O'Brien originally planned to move to New York City, but felt that she did not want to live in the city.

== Career ==
After O'Brien moved to Los Angeles, O'Brien spent the first three months watching theater performances, taking classes for voice and movement, and studying the Equity Waiver Plan. O'Brien was one of 400 people who showed up to audition for parts in Mary Barnes, a theater play based on the autobiography Mary Barnes: Two Accounts of a Journey Through Madness. Director Rons Sossi initially considered her for the role of patient Angie, but after repeated callbacks and auditions, he selected her to portray Barnes. Her first role in Los Angeles, O'Brien initially turned the role down because a dramatic scene involving nudity frightened her, but Sossi convinced her to take a risk, stating to her that it would be okay to risk herself. O'Brien received L.A. Drama Critics Circle and LA Weekly awards for her performance of the role. O'Brien reprised the role in the revival of Mary Barnes in Odyssey Theatre in 1995. In 1984, O'Brien, along with six other actors, was nominated for the category of Ensemble Performance for the performance of the ensemble in Quilters at the L.A. Drama Critics Circle Awards. Her work on stage also included winning two major awards for her lead roles in Savage in Limbo and Times Like These.

As an on-camera actress, O'Brien has guest starred on the soap opera Santa Barbara as a hooker as well as other numerous TV series including Trapper John, M.D., NYPD Blue, Matlock, Chicago Hope, ER, CSI: Crime Scene Investigation, CSI: Miami, 7th Heaven, Reasonable Doubts, Shark, Three Rivers, Detroit 1-8-7, and L.A. Law on which she played a woman on trial for killing her rapist. TV movies include The Defiant Ones, Too Young to Die?, Infidelity, Children of the Night, Convicted, and One More Mountain. Movies include Bottle Shock in which she played Chris Pine's mother.

== Personal life ==
In 1973, O'Brien met a doctor while working at National Jewish Hospital. Being supportive of her remedial work, he was married to O'Brien in 1976. The marriage was later filed for a divorce in late 1980. Later, she married actor Carl Weintraub. The couple had one son named Cory, who was born in 1989 or 1990.

== Acting credits ==
=== Theater ===
Year(s)	Title	Role	Venue	Notes	Ref(s)
1982–83	Mary Barnes	Mary Barnes	Odyssey Theatre, Los Angeles	Professional debut; leading role L.A. Drama Critics Circle Award for Performance/Leading Role; LA Weekly award	
1983	Strawberry Envy	Kentucky Froth Belle	Los Angeles City College, Los Angeles	Included in the second bill of Louis B. Mayer Playwright's Workshop Festival	
1983	Where I Live		Itchey Foote, Los Angeles	Based on Tennessee Williams' essays	
1983–84	Quilters	Garrett's daughter	Music Center Plaza, Los Angeles	Nominated - L.A. Drama Critics Circle Award for Ensemble Performance	
1984	Vampire Guts	Louise	Pilot Theatre, Los Angeles		
1984	Gardenia	Lydie Breeze	Los Angeles Actors' Theatre, Los Angeles	Second chapter of Lydie Breeze series	
1984	Women and Water	Lydie Breeze	Los Angeles Actors' Theatre, Los Angeles	Fourth chapter of Lydie Breeze series	
1986	The History of Fear		Victory Theatre, Burbank		
1986	Inside Out		Beverly Hills Playhouse, Beverly Hills	Solo role; also playwright	
1987	Savage in Limbo	Denise Savage	The Cast Theatre, Los Angeles	Leading role L.A. Drama Critics Circle Award for Lead Performance	
1993	Juliet		Odyssey Theatre, Los Angeles		
1993	Can Can		Odyssey Theatre, Los Angeles		
1993	The Love Suicide at Schofield Barracks		Odyssey Theatre, Los Angeles		
1995	Mary Barnes	Mary Barnes	Odyssey Theatre, Los Angeles	Leading role; revival	
1999	The Greeks	Helen	Odyssey Theatre, Los Angeles		
2003	Times Like These		Odyssey Theatre, Los Angeles	Oviation Award for the performance of the role	
2006	First Monday in October	Ruth Loomis	Odyssey Theatre, Los Angeles		
2012	I Am Chrissie	Herself	Promenade Playhouse, Los Angeles	Leading role; also playwright	
2017	Pie in the Sky	Dory	Victory Theatre, Burbank		

=== Film ===
Year(s)	Title	Role	Notes	Ref(s)
1982	Timerider: The Adventure of Lyle Swann	Terry	Film debut	
1986	The Adventures of the American Rabbit	Bunny O' Hare (voice)		
1987	Harry and the Hendersons	Screaming Woman		
1992	Gas Food Lodging	Thelma		
2001	Mockingbird Don't Sing	Beverly Glazer		
2002	American Gun	Martin's Mother		
2004	Around the Bend	Ruth		
2005	Invasion	Reporter		
2006	Little Chenier	Faye		
2008	Bottle Shock	Laura		
2008	Disfigured	Sheila		
2022	Pie in the Sky	Dory	Film adaptation of the live show of the same name	

=== Television ===
Year	Title	Role	Notes	Ref(s)
1983	Dynasty	Maid	Television debut Episode: "Reunion in Singapore"	
1983	St. Elsewhere	Mrs. Morgen	Episode: "Working"	
1983	Knight Rider	Linda Groves	Episode: "Nobody Does It Better"	
1983–85	Dungeons & Dragons	Additional voices	27 episodes	
1984	Legmen	Mary Smith	Episode: "I Shall Be Re-Released"	
1984	Calamity Jane	Mamie	Television film	
1984	Saturday's the Place!	Herself	Television film	
1984–91	Muppet Babies	Baby Piggy, Captain Crochette Hook (voice)	107 episodes	
1985	Obsessed with a Married Woman	Gali	Television film	
1985	Santa Barbara	Hooker	2 episodes	
1985	The Transformers	Astoria Carlton-Ritz (voice)	Episode: "The Girl Who Loved Powerglide"	
1985	Shadow Chasers	Vicki Pasternack	Episode: "Spirit of St. Louis"	
1985	The GLO Friends Save Christmas	Additional voices	Television film	
1986	The Defiant Ones	Pauline	Television film	
1986	Trapper John, M.D.	Oliva	Episode: "Life, Death, and Dr. Christmas"	
1986	Cagney & Lacey	Linda Donner	Episode: "Extradition"	
1986	Convicted	Audrey Delaney	Television film	
1987	Deadly Care	Gloria	Television film	
1987	Infidelity	Eileen	Television film	
1987	The Real Ghostbusters	Vanna (voice)	Episode: "The Cabinet of Calamari"	
1988	Ohara	Ruth Britton	Episode: "Sign of the Times"	
1988	L.A. Law	Megan Penny	Episode: "Belle of the Bald"	
1989	ABC Weekend Special	Lewis' Mom, Trashy's Sister	Episode: "The Monster Bed"	
1990	Too Young to Die?	Wanda Bradley Sledge	Television film	
1990	Cartoon All-Stars to the Rescue	Baby Piggy, Mom (voice)	Television film	
1990	Gabriel's Fire	Kathy Danube	Episode: "To Catch a Con: Part 2"	
1991	The Antagonists	Aly	Episode: "Brother to Brother"	
1992	Reasonable Doubts	Esther Nichols	Episode: "Maggie Finds Her Soul"	
1993	Beyond Suspicion	Pat	Television film	
1993–94	Cro	Ivanna (voice)	14 episodes	
1994	One More Mountain	Elizabeth Graves	Television film	
1995	Vanishing Son	Sandra Garbett	Episode: "Sweet Sixteen"	
1995	Picket Fences	Sara Hynes	Episode: "The Song of Rome"	
1995	Live Shot	Marilyn Maitland	2 episodes	
1996	The Lazarus Man	Charlotte Bower	Episode: "The Conspirator"	
1996	Walker, Texas Ranger	Becky Stanton	Episode: "A Ranger Christmas"	
1996, 1999	Chicago Hope	Myra Delaney, Antonia White	2 episodes	
1997	Crisis Center	Mrs. Thomas	Episode: "Where Truth Lies"	
1997	7th Heaven	Carol	Episode: "I Love You"	
1997, 2001	NYPD Blue	Mrs. Pierson, Dr. Rosen	2 episodes	
1998	Beyond Belief: Fact or Fiction	Paula Myrtle	Season 2, Episode 5 Segment: "The Land"; Credited as Laurie O' Brian	
1998	ER	Mrs. Richards	Episode: "The Miracle Worker"	
2000	Boston Public	Melanie Fitzgerald	Episode: "Chapter Six"	
2001	Strong Medicine	Arlene Billings	Episode: "Impaired"	
2002	The Zeta Project	Paula	Episode: "Eye of the Storm"	
2002	Presidio Med	Denise Dembry	Episode: "This Baby's Gonna Fly"	
2003	CSI: Miami	Mary Hinkle	Episode: "Double Cap"	
2004	The Division	Connie Hicks	Episode: "Be Careful What You Wish For"	
2005	CSI: Crime Scene Investigation	Mrs. Meyers	Episode: "Shooting Stars"	
2006	Smith	Barbara Collins	Episode: "Two"	
2007	Shark	Amanda Morton	Episode: "Wayne's World 2: Revenge of the Shark"	
2009	Three Rivers	Ruth	Episode: "Ryan's First Day"	
2010	Detroit 1-8-7	June Burke	Episode: "Pharmacy Double/Bullet Train"	
2013	Susanna	Dr. Anderson	3 episodes	
2014	Complete Works	Deborah Hünterschmidt	5 episodes	

== Awards ==
- L.A. Drama Critics Circle Award for the category of Performance/Leading Role for the role of Mary Barnes in Mary Barnes, 1983
- LA Weekly award for the role of Mary Barnes in Mary Barnes, 1983
- L.A. Drama Critics Circle Award for the category of Lead Performance for the role of Denise Savage in Savage in Limbo, 1987
- Ovation Award, Times Like These, 2003
