= The Bob Newhart Show (1961 TV series) =

- Genre: Comedy variety
- Starring: Bob Newhart
- Country of origin: United States
- Original language: English
- No. of episodes: 27 episodes

Production
- Producer: Roland Kibbee
- Production locations: Ziegfeld Theatre, New York City
- Running time: 60 minutes
- Production company: Armanco Productions

Original release
- Network: NBC
- Release: October 11, 1961 – June 13, 1962

The Bob Newhart Show is an American comedy variety show starring comedian Bob Newhart. It originally ran from October 1961 through June 1962 on NBC, airing on Wednesday nights at 10 p.m. Eastern time, immediately following Perry Como's Kraft Music Hall. The variety show was sponsored by Kraft Foods's Sealtest Dairy division.

The show was awarded the Primetime Emmy Award for Outstanding Program Achievement in the Field of Humor (now known as the Emmy for Outstanding Comedy Series) in 1962. It was also nominated for the Writing Achievement in Comedy Award for Roland Kibbee, Bob Newhart, Don Hinkley, Milt Rosen, Ernest Chambers, Dean Hargrove, Robert Kaufman, Norm Liebmann, Charles Sherman, Howard Snyder and Larry Siegel, but they lost to Carl Reiner for The Dick Van Dyke Show. The show also won a Peabody Award in 1961.

Preceded by The Jack Benny Program	Emmy Award for Outstanding Program in the Field of Humor; 1962	Succeeded by The Dick Van Dyke Show
