= Milt Rosen =

American television writer and author (1922–2000)

- Born: August 1922; Poland
- Died: August 11, 2000 (aged 77); Los Angeles, California, US
- Education: City College of New York; University of Iowa
- Occupations: Television writer, author
- Children: 2 or 3

Milt Rosen (August 1922 – August 11, 2000) was an American television writer and author. Known for his one-liners, he wrote for actors, including Arnold Schwarzenegger.

== Biography ==
Rosen was born August 1922, in Poland, and moved to New York City as a toddler. He attended the City College of New York, then the postgraduate writing program of the University of Iowa. He served in World War II as a navigator for the Eighth Air Force in the Western Front. He was awarded five Air Medals. After the war, he lived in the Bronx and taught English at a middle school. He wrote comedy routines between classes. He moved to California in 1958 and became a full-time comedy writer. He went on to also write dramas.

As a writer, Rosen was best known for his one-liners, with the headline of his obituary in The New York Times dubbing him "a master of zingers". He wrote one-liners for actors Milton Berle and Arnold Schwarzenegger, as well as California governor Pete Wilson, among others. He wrote the script for Do Not Disturb, alongside Doris Day. His and Robert Foster's script for "Murder Comes in Little Pills", an episode of the legal drama Kate McShane, was nominated for an Edgar. He received an Emmy nomination for The Bob Newhart Show. He also wrote for The A-Team, Baa Baa Black Sheep, CHiPs, The Colgate Comedy Hour, The Flying Nun, Lewis & Clark, Mr. Novak, Tales of the Gold Monkey, and Too Close for Comfort, among other shows. He was a member of the Friars Club of Beverly Hills and Writers Guild of America. He wrote 14 books, which included two books of insults. Rosen shared a room with Woody Allen during their early careers. In his memoir, Allen described him as "an older, portly comedy writer" and expressed disgust with sharing a double bed with him. Allen ended up liking him.

Rosen was the founder and president of the Eddie Cantor Lodge. He taught writing at the University of California, Los Angeles, and the University of Southern California. He married Judy Rosen in 1960 and had two or three children. He died on August 11, 2000, aged 77, from cancer, at his home in Northridge, Los Angeles. He was buried on August 15. After his death, his wife donated many of his scripts to libraries and museums.

== Writing credits ==
Adopted from TV Guide.

- The Colgate Comedy Hour (1950–1955)
- The Danny Thomas Show (1953–1964)
- Do Not Disturb (1956)
- Happy (1960–1961)
- My Three Sons (1960–1972)
- The Joey Bishop Show (1961–1964)
- I'm Dickens, He's Fenster (1962–1963)
- The Lloyd Bridges Show (1962–1963)
- Mr. Novak (1963–1965)
- Bewitched (1964–1972)
- Please Don't Eat the Daisies (1965–1967)
- That Girl (1966–1971)
- The Carol Burnett Show (1967–1978)
- The Flying Nun (1967–1970)
- He & She (1967–1968)
- The Brady Bunch (1969–1974)
- Love, American Style (1969–1974)
- Room 222 (1969–1974)
- The Partners (1971–1972)
- The Bob Newhart Show (1972–1978)
- Here We Go Again (1973)
- Chico and the Man (1974–1978)
- The Dean Martin Celebrity Roast (1974–1984)
- Kate McShane (1975)
- Baretta (1975–1978)
- Baa Baa Black Sheep (1976–1978)
- CHiPs (1977–1983)
- Dog and Cat (1977)
- Vegas (1978–1981)
- The Facts of Life (1979–1988)
- Hello, Larry (1979–1980)
- Trapper John, M.D. (1979–1986)
- Enos (1980–1981)
- Too Close for Comfort (1980–1987)
- Lewis & Clark (1981–1982)
- Tales of the Gold Monkey (1982–1983)
- Silver Spoons (1982–1987)
- The A-Team (1983–1987)
- Cover Up (1984–1985)
- E/R (1984–1985)
- Safe at Home (1985–1987)
