= Infidelity (1987 film) =

- Print advertisement
- Genre: Drama; Romance
- Written by: Sue Jett
- Directed by: David Lowell Rich
- Starring: Kirstie Alley; Lee Horsley; Laurie O'Brien; Robert Englund; Courtney Thorne-Smith
- Music by: Steve Dorff
- Country of origin: United States
- Original language: English

Production
- Executive producer: Ilene Amy Berg
- Producers: Sue Jett; Tony Mark
- Cinematography: Jacques R. Marquette
- Editor: Richard Bracken
- Running time: 95 minutes
- Production companies: ABC Circle Films; Mark/Jett Productions

Original release
- Network: ABC
- Release: April 13, 1987

Infidelity is a 1987 American made-for-television drama film starring Kirstie Alley and Lee Horsley, directed by David Lowell Rich (his final film project). It was originally broadcast on ABC on April 13, 1987.

== Plot ==
A happily married couple, Ellie and Nick Denato, are living in the wildlife of Africa with their young daughter, Melissa. Even though they have everything that they had ever wanted there, they return to San Francisco so Nick can focus on his career as a photographer and Ellie can give birth to their second child. Soon, life goes on a downward spiral for the high-powered, two-career couple, as Ellie is not satisfied in their surroundings. She misses her life as a doctor in Africa and suspects that Nick is not faithful to her when Scott's young and attractive assistant, Robin, arrives. When his partner, Scott, convinces Nick to go on a business trip to Nepal for six weeks, she reluctantly accepts the situation.

Shortly after his departure, Ellie suffers a miscarriage. Instead of dealing with her loss, she feels scattered and disconnected, pretending that nothing has happened and she even claims that Nick should have never returned from Nepal to support her. The marriage continues to crumble, and Nick eventually commits infidelity by sleeping with Ellie's best friend, Eileen, the one woman who took care of him when his wife did not. To worsen the matters, Ellie changes her behavior shortly after, realizing that she was a "maniac" and mistreated her husband and loves him very much.

When Ellie finds Nick's watch in Eileen's bed, she finds out about the indiscretion. Left with a broken heart, she takes Melissa and leaves for Africa, despite Nick and Eileen's attempts to assure her that their one night together meant nothing. In Africa, Ellie throws herself on her work and meanwhile raises Melissa. Six months later, Eileen is out of the picture in Nick's life, and he is still devastated by his wife's absence. Ellie, however, enjoys life and falls for the charms of French doctor Etienne. She accompanies him to London, where she walks into Nick and Robin at the airport.

Initially, Ellie refuses to speak with Nick, though he is able to tell her that cheating on her has been the biggest mistake in his life. Ellie, nevertheless, goes through with the divorce and even takes off her wedding ring. However, she is unable to consummate her relationship with Etienne due to the past, much to Etienne's frustration. Meanwhile, Nick and Robin grow closer, but he rejects her when she wants to sleep with him, explaining that he is still in love with Ellie. The following morning, Nick is informed that his uncle Vito has died.

Simultaneously, Ellie and Melissa return to San Francisco for a short stay. There, old memories, dedications and an emotional funeral make Ellie realize that Nick still loves her very much. Even though she kisses him, she is not ready to take him back and says goodbye. Instead, she travels to Paris to meet with Etienne. After spending one night with him, she packs her stuff and returns to Africa. Nick accompanies her there shortly after, and reunites with her.

== Cast ==
- Kirstie Alley as Eliot "Ellie" Denato
- Lee Horsley as Nick Denato
- Laurie O'Brien as Eileen
- Robert Englund as Scott
- Courtney Thorne-Smith as Robin
- Lindsay Parker as Melissa "Millie" Denato
- Michael Carven as Etienne
- Vera Lockwood as Rose
- Alfred Dennis as Uncle Vito
- Lynne Charnay as Aunt Flo
- Ben Wright as Edgar
- Jeb Ellis-Brown as Ray
- Helaine Lembeck as Jennifer

== Reception ==
Infidelity received both positive and negative reviews when it first premiered in 1987. Faye Zuckerman of The Gainesville Sun wrote that the viewer will be "bored" and most likely "will have changed the channel" before infidelity has taken place. Zuckerman furthermore criticized writer Sue Jett for waiting for the marital discretion to occur until halfway through the movie, as well as stating that the last half of the film "crumbled."

On a more cheerful side, syndicated columnist Judy Flander wrote that the infidelity theme was explored with "refreshing candor". She also wrote: "It is hardly a cliché. It is a story of strong love, of family, and, more than anything, a real romance."

In a review by The Washington Post, the film was dismissed as irrelevant by reviewer Tom Shales who criticized Jett: "Though written by a woman (Sue Jett), the film seems determined to make iron-clad allowances for Nick's little-bitty lapse. He does commit adultery, yes, but gee, it's with plain, dull, frumpy old Eileen (Laurie O'Brien) and not with his young, beautiful, tantalizing blond assistant Robin (the gawjuss Courtney Thorne-Smith)."

Kirstie Alley claimed that following the film's release, she received several letters of women writing that the film helped save their marriage.
