= Three Coins in the Fountain (film) =

1954 film by Jean Negulesco

- Theatrical release poster
- Directed by: Jean Negulesco
- Screenplay by: John Patrick
- Based on: Coins in the Fountain by John H. Secondari
- Produced by: Sol C. Siegel
- Starring: Clifton Webb; Dorothy McGuire; Jean Peters; Louis Jourdan; Maggie McNamara; Rossano Brazzi; Howard St. John; Kathryn Givney; Cathleen Nesbitt
- Cinematography: Milton Krasner
- Edited by: William Reynolds
- Music by: Victor Young
- Production company: 20th Century Fox
- Distributed by: 20th Century Fox
- Release date: May 20, 1954
- Running time: 102 minutes
- Country: United States
- Language: English
- Budget: $1.7 million
- Box office: $5 million (US and Canada rentals); $12 million (worldwide rentals)

Three Coins in the Fountain is a 1954 American romantic comedy drama film directed by Jean Negulesco from a screenplay by John Patrick, based on the 1952 novel Coins in the Fountain by John H. Secondari. It stars Clifton Webb, Dorothy McGuire, Jean Peters, Louis Jourdan, and Maggie McNamara, with Rossano Brazzi, Howard St. John, Kathryn Givney, and Cathleen Nesbitt. The film follows three American women working in Rome who dream of finding romance in the Eternal City. The film's working titles were We Believe in Love and There's No Place Like Rome.

The film's main title song "Three Coins in the Fountain", sung by an uncredited Frank Sinatra, went on to become an enduring standard. The film was made in Italy during the "Hollywood on the Tiber" era.

At the 27th Academy Awards in 1955, the film won Best Cinematography and Best Song, and was nominated for Best Picture.

== Plot ==
Young American secretary Maria Williams arrives in Rome, greeted by Anita Hutchins, whom she is replacing at the United States Distribution Agency. They drive to the Villa Eden, which Anita shares with Frances, the longtime secretary of American author John Frederick Shadwell, an expatriate living in Rome. On their way, they stop at the Trevi Fountain, where Maria learns the legend that throwing a coin in the fountain while wishing to return to Rome will make the wish come true. Maria and Frances throw in their coins; Anita, returning to the US, declines.

At the agency, Anita introduces Maria to Giorgio Bianchi, a translator. When Maria comments on Giorgio's attractiveness, Anita informs Maria that the agency forbids fraternization between American secretaries and Italian employees. At a party that evening, Maria becomes smitten with the handsome Prince Dino di Cessi, despite being warned of his reputation as a womanizer, notorious for taking women to Venice for romantic trysts. Dino charms Maria.

Noting Maria's interest in Dino, Anita confesses to Maria that she is leaving because she has a better chance of finding a husband in the US. She warns Maria that wealthy Italian men are not interested in mere secretaries, and men who are interested are too poor. Later, they encounter Giorgio, who invites Anita to attend a celebration with him at his family's country farm the next day. Anita reluctantly agrees.

As Giorgio picks Anita up in his cousin's dilapidated truck, they are spotted by her boss, Burgoyne. Giorgio, who mentions having thrown a coin in the Trevi Fountain on first arriving in Rome, tells Anita that he is studying to become a lawyer. Giving in to mutual attraction, they kiss. Meanwhile, Dino asks Maria to accompany him to Venice. Desiring to see Venice but wary of damage to her reputation, Maria arranges for Frances to chaperone them—to Dino's disappointment.

At the agency, Burgoyne questions Maria about Anita's weekend with Giorgio. Although Maria maintains that Anita did nothing wrong, Burgoyne fires Giorgio. Blaming Maria for betraying her trust, Anita moves out of their apartment. She visits Giorgio, worried that she might have ruined his chances of becoming a lawyer. Giorgio has no regrets.

Determined to attract Dino, Maria collects information about his interests and preferences, including his love of modern art and his favorite food and wine. She lies about being "three-quarters Italian". Beguiled by how much they have in common, Dino introduces Maria to his mother, the Principessa, who approves. Dino confides to Maria that his mother is the only other woman whom he has ever completely trusted; conscience-stricken, Maria confesses her subterfuge. He angrily takes her home.

Anita admits to Frances that she and Giorgio are in love but will not marry because he is too poor. Comforting the dispirited Maria at home, Frances learns that Maria also plans to leave Rome because Dino continues to stay away. Frances then announces to Shadwell that she is returning to the US to avoid ending up an old maid in a foreign country. Unaware that Frances has been in love with him for 15 years, Shadwell offers her a marriage of convenience based on mutual respect, which she accepts.

During a physical exam the next day, Shadwell learns he is terminally ill with less than a year to live unless he goes to the US for experimental treatment. He ends his engagement to Frances. After learning about Shadwell's condition from his doctor, Frances follows him to a café, where they drown their sorrows while bickering about whether he should pursue treatment. Realizing Frances's attachment to him, Shadwell visits Dino and informs him that he is leaving for the US, where he will marry Frances. Shadwell uses reverse psychology to convince Dino that he loves Maria.

As Anita and Maria are packed and ready to leave, Frances telephones, asking them to meet at the Trevi Fountain. There, Maria and Anita are disappointed to see the fountain emptied for cleaning. When they are joined by Frances, however, the water springs up again, prophetically, as Dino and Giorgio arrive in turn. As the men embrace their respective women, Shadwell joins Frances, and they all happily admire the fountain.

== Cast ==
- Clifton Webb as John Frederick Shadwell
- Dorothy McGuire as Miss Frances
- Jean Peters as Anita Hutchins
- Louis Jourdan as Prince Dino di Cessi
- Maggie McNamara as Maria Williams
- Rossano Brazzi as Giorgio Bianchi
- Howard St. John as Burgoyne
- Kathryn Givney as Mrs. Burgoyne
- Cathleen Nesbitt as Principessa

== Reception ==
=== Critical response ===
Upon its theatrical release, the film received generally positive reviews, particularly for its color and CinemaScope widescreen cinematography of Italian filming locations. In his review in The New York Times, Bosley Crowther wrote, "Three Coins in the Fountain is quite clearly a film in which the locale comes first. However, the nonsense of its fable tumbles nicely within the picture frame." Famed film critic Pauline Kael said of the film, "Hollywood has learned to inflate everything, even romance." Crowther underscored the film's visual appeal to the audiences of his time.

A nice way to take the movie audience on a sightseeing tour of Rome, with a flying side trip to Venice, through the courtesy of CinemaScope, has been devised in Three Coins in the Fountain, a handsomely colored romance that 20th Century-Fox delivered to the Roxy yesterday. The trick is to underpin the picture with flimsy and harmless accounts of the plainly romantic adventures of three American girls in Rome and then chase them with the camera around the Eternal City as they pursue their destinies.

Variety noted that the film "has warmth, humor, a rich dose of romance and almost incredible pictorial appeal."

On the review aggregator website Rotten Tomatoes, the film holds an approval rating of 60% based on 10 reviews, with an average rating of 5.9/10.

=== Accolades ===
Award	Category	Recipient(s)	Result	Ref.
Academy Awards	Best Picture	Sol C. Siegel	Nominated	
Academy Awards	Best Cinematography	Milton Krasner	Won	
Academy Awards	Best Original Song	"Three Coins in the Fountain"; Music by Jule Styne; Lyrics by Sammy Cahn	Won	
Directors Guild of America Awards	Outstanding Directorial Achievement in Motion Pictures	Jean Negulesco	Nominated	
Venice International Film Festival	Golden Lion	Jean Negulesco	Nominated	

== Remakes ==
Three other films based on the same novel have been released. The first was the 1964 musical The Pleasure Seekers starring Ann-Margret, Carol Lynley, and Pamela Tiffin, also directed by Jean Negulesco. The second was a 1966 20th Century Fox pilot for an unsold television series, which was directed by Hal Kanter, written by Kanter and Melville Shavelson and stars Cynthia Pepper, Yvonne Craig, and Joanna Moore. The television film was finally broadcast in 1970. Sergio Franchi sang the title song. The third was the 1990 television film Coins in the Fountain starring Loni Anderson.

The plot of the 2010 film When in Rome is the reverse of Three Coins in the Fountain—a woman takes coins from a love fountain in Rome and finds unwanted love.

A stage musical using standards by Styne and Cahn was presented in 1997 at The Muny in St. Louis, directed by Paul Blake. It starred Leslie Denniston, Lara Teeter, Joel Higgins, Maureen Brennan, Michele Pawk, and James Clow.
