= Edith Sommer =

American writer

- Born: Edith Rose Sommer; August 21, 1917; Chicago, Illinois, U.S.
- Died: February 1, 1991 (aged 73); Santa Barbara, California, U.S.
- Occupations: Screenwriter, TV writer
- Spouse: Robert Soderberg

Edith Rose Sommer (August 21, 1917 - February 1, 1991) was an American screenwriter, playwright, and TV writer active from the 1940s through the 1970s. She worked with director Jean Negulesco on several films, and later worked extensively on soap operas, forming a writing team with her husband, Robert Soderberg. She and Soderberg—who may have met while working on the script for Nicholas Ray's Born to Be Bad—were nominated for several Daytime Emmys.

== Selected filmography ==
TV

- As the World Turns (1 episode; 1978)
- The Ghost and Mrs. Muir (1 episode; 1969)
- Burke's Law (3 episodes; 1963–64)
- Cavalcade of America (1 episode; 1955)
- Guiding Light (head writer; 1969–73)

Theater

- A Roomful of Roses (Broadway; 1955)

Film

- This Property Is Condemned (1966)
- The Pleasure Seekers (1964)
- Jessica (1962)
- The Best of Everything (1959)
- Blue Denim (1959)
- Teenage Rebel (1956)
- Born to Be Bad (1950)
- Perfect Strangers (1950)
