= Round Trip (Sadao Watanabe album) =

Studio album by Sadao Watanabe
- Released: October 21, 1970
- Recorded: July 15, 1970
- Venue: New York City
- Studio: Allegro Sound Studio
- Genre: Jazz
- Length: 43:53
- Label: CBS/Sony
- Producer: Kiyoshi Itoh

Sadao Watanabe chronology
Sadao Watanabe at Montreux Jazz Festival (1970)	Round Trip (1970)	Collaboration (1970)

Professional ratings
Review scores
Source	Rating
Allmusic	4.5/5 stars

Round Trip is a 1970 jazz album by the Japanese saxophonist Sadao Watanabe with Chick Corea, Miroslav Vitouš and Jack DeJohnette.

== Track listing ==
All tracks composed by Sadao Watanabe; except where indicated

1. "Round Trip: Going and Coming" (Watanabe, Y. Masuo) – 20:02
2. "Nostalgia" – 5:52
3. "Pastoral" – 14:45
4. "Sao Paulo" – 7:36

== Personnel ==
- Sadao Watanabe - Sopranino sax & flute
- Chick Corea - piano & electric piano
- Miroslav Vitouš - Bass
- Jack DeJohnette - drums
- Ulpio Minucci - piano on São Paulo
