= Kate McShane =

Television series

- Genre: Legal drama
- Created by: Robert C. Peters; Howard Rayfiel
- Starring: Anne Meara
- Composer: John Cacavas
- Country of origin: United States
- Original language: English
- No. of seasons: 1
- No. of episodes: 11 (2 unaired)

Production
- Executive producer: E. Jack Neuman
- Producers: Howard Rayfiel; Robert Foster; Robert Stambler
- Running time: 60 minutes
- Production company: Paramount Television

Original release
- Network: CBS
- Release: September 10 – November 12, 1975

Kate McShane is an American legal drama television series that aired from September 10 until November 12, 1975. Kate McShane was the first series to feature a female lawyer in the lead role. A two-hour pilot film aired April 11, 1975.

== Premise ==
Kate McShane is an Irish American lawyer working in Los Angeles who is fiercely dedicated to her clients, pushing the letter of the law to attain satisfaction for them and herself. She also gets help from her dad, an ex-cop, and her brother, a priest and a law professor.

== Cast ==
- Anne Meara as Kate McShane. Despite a shortened run, Meara was nominated for an Emmy Award.
- Charles Haid as Ed McShane
- Sean McClory as Pat McShane
- Benjamin Stiller, Anne Meara and Jerry Stiller's son, then almost 10, is listed on an 8/14/1975 Call Sheet in the role of Nickie in the “Little Bit of Knowledge" episode (episode 11).

== Episodes ==
| No. | Title | Directed by | Written by | Original release date |
|---|---|---|---|---|
| 1 | "The Best Possible Defense (a.k.a. A Roar of Silence)" | Robert Scheerer | Milt Rosen | September 10, 1975 |
Kate and her crew defends a former anti-war militant.
| 2 | "Terror on Sycamore Street" | Robert Scheerer | Michael Butler | September 17, 1975 |
A homeowner is charged with killing a narcotics agent, but he claims it was self-defense.
| 3 | "World vs. Ackerman" | Jack Shea | David Karp | September 24, 1975 |
An old man is accused of killing a robber in his own house.
| 4 | "Murder Comes in Little Pills (a.k.a. First and Ten)" | Robert Scheerer | Milt Rosen and Robert Foster | October 1, 1975 |
A professional football player might have killed his girlfriend while on drugs.
| 5 | "Accounts Receivable" | David Friedkin | Michael Butler | October 8, 1975 |
A federal agent wants Kate to drop an investigation of a murder.
| 6 | "Publish or Perish" | Corey Allen | Paul Lichtman and Leon Tokatyan | October 22, 1975 |
A scientist admits to killing a Nobel Prize winner.
| 7 | "Conspiracy of Silence" | John Peyser | Peter Lefcourt | October 29, 1975 |
Kate defends a female magazine editor (Susan Strasberg), against a libel suit after she accuses a firm of paying off corrupt politicians to keep unsafe toys on the market.
| 8 | "Midnight Lady, Pretty Lady" | Bill Bixby | David Friedkin, Milt Rosen and Robert Foster | November 5, 1975 |
A former rock star is accused of contributing to his girlfriend's drug overdose.
| 9 | "God at $15,732 a Year" | Unknown | Unknown | November 12, 1975 |
Kate defends a detective who shot a suspect.
| 10 | "The Not So Small Claims Court Case" | N/A | N/A | Unaired |
A con man disappears before he gets taken in to the small claims court.
| 11 | "A Little Knowledge is a Dangerous Thing" | N/A | N/A | Unaired |

== Bibliography ==
- Tim Brooks and Earle Marsh, The Complete Directory to Prime Time Network and Cable TV Shows 1946–Present, Ninth edition (New York: Ballantine Books, 2007) ISBN 978-0-345-49773-4
