= Ulpio Minucci =

Italian composer (1917–2007)

Ulpio Minucci (June 29, 1917 – March 9, 2007) was an Italian-born American composer and musician.

Minucci wrote a number of notable pieces in the 1950s, including "Domani," "A Thousand Thoughts of You," and "Felicia." He was nominated for two Emmy Awards for his work on ABC's Saga of Western Man in 1964 and 1965. He also composed the theme and musical score for the 1985 animated television series Robotech.

He also played piano on Round Trip, a 1974 jazz album by Japanese saxophonist Sadao Watanabe.

On January 10, 1989, he attempted to sue Frank Agrama and Harmony Gold, Inc. for alleged copyright infringement and various other claims. The case was dismissed March 1, 1989, without motion to appeal.

Minucci married his wife Catherine in 1952 with whom he had a son, Chieli, and a daughter, Nina. Chieli became an Emmy-winning jazz guitarist, who recorded covers of some of his father's songs. Ulpio Minucci died of natural causes at his home in Brentwood, Los Angeles, California on March 9, 2007.

== Works ==
- Robotech: The Shadow Chronicles (2006) – original theme
- Robotech: Battlecry (2002) – original theme
- Robotech II: The Sentinels (1988) – original theme
- Robotech: The Movie (1986) – original theme
- Robotech (1985) – composer
- The White Lions (1981) – music supervisor
- The Day That Shook the World (1975) – musical director
- Saga of Western Man (1964) – composer
