= Carl Weintraub =

American actor (born 1946)

- Born: March 27, 1946 (age 78); Berkeley, California, U.S.
- Occupation: Actor
- Years active: 1969–present
- Spouse: Laurie O'Brien
- Children: 1

Carl Weintraub (born March 27, 1946) is an American actor who appeared on numerous television shows from the 1970s to the 2000s in addition to several films.

Weintraub had a starring role in Coins in the Fountain. He appeared in Beverly Hills Cop and Air Force One. He has also been featured in guest appearances Without a Trace, 8 Simple Rules, Judging Amy, ER, Days of Our Lives, Baywatch Nights, Cagney & Lacey, Trapper John, M.D., Remington Steele, Hill Street Blues, Barnaby Jones and Police Woman.

As a voice actor, Weintraub has appeared in Oliver & Company as the voice of DeSoto.

In 2013, he performed in Breadcrumbs Along the Trail, a solo performance. He is a founder of We Tell Stories, a theatre group.

Weintraub is also a partner in the Firefly Bistro in Pasadena, California.

== Awards and honors ==
Weintraub is a recipient of the PASA Award (Professional Artists in Schools) for lifetime achievement.

== Personal life ==
Weintraub is married to actress Laurie O'Brien.

== Filmography ==
=== Film ===
Year	Title	Role	Notes
1980	Cheech and Chong's Next Movie	Cop at Hotel #6	
1984	Beverly Hills Cop	Detroit Station Cop #2	
1986	Modern Girls	Bartender	
1988	Oliver & Company	Desoto	Voice
1990	Coins in the Fountain	Joe	TV movie
1997	Air Force One	AFO Co-Pilot Lt. Col. Ingrahams	

=== Television ===
Year	Title	Role	Notes
1976–1977	Executive Suite	Harry Ragin	19 episodes
1986	Dads	Louie Mangotti	9 episodes
2000–2001	Days of Our Lives	Vincent Moroni	45 episodes
2016–2017	StartUp	Andrew Talman	3 episodes
