= Hollywood on the Tiber =

Era in Italian filmmaking

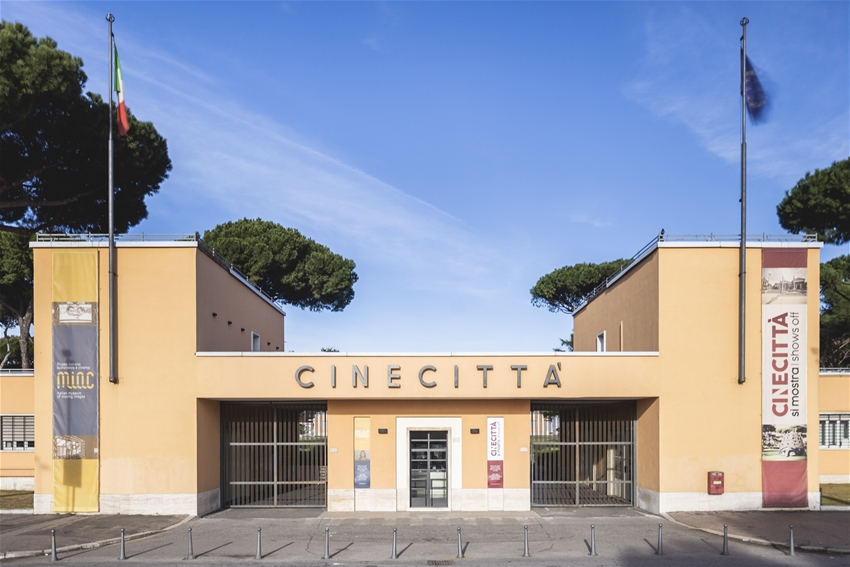
The Italian studio complex Cinecittà, the largest film studio in Europe, where the films were made.

Hollywood on the Tiber is a phrase used to describe the period in the 1950s and 1960s when the Italian capital of Rome emerged as a major location for international filmmaking attracting many foreign productions to the Cinecittà studios. It was used in a June 26, 1950 Time magazine article. By contrast to the native Italian film industry, these movies were made in English for global release. Although the market for many of these films was primarily American, they enjoyed widespread popularity in other countries, including Italy.

The commercial success of Quo Vadis (1951) led to a stream of blockbusters produced in Italy by Hollywood studios, which reached its height with 20th Century Fox's Cleopatra in 1963. The phrase "Hollywood on Tiber", a reference to the river that runs through Rome, was coined in 1950 by Time magazine during the making of Quo Vadis.

== Background ==
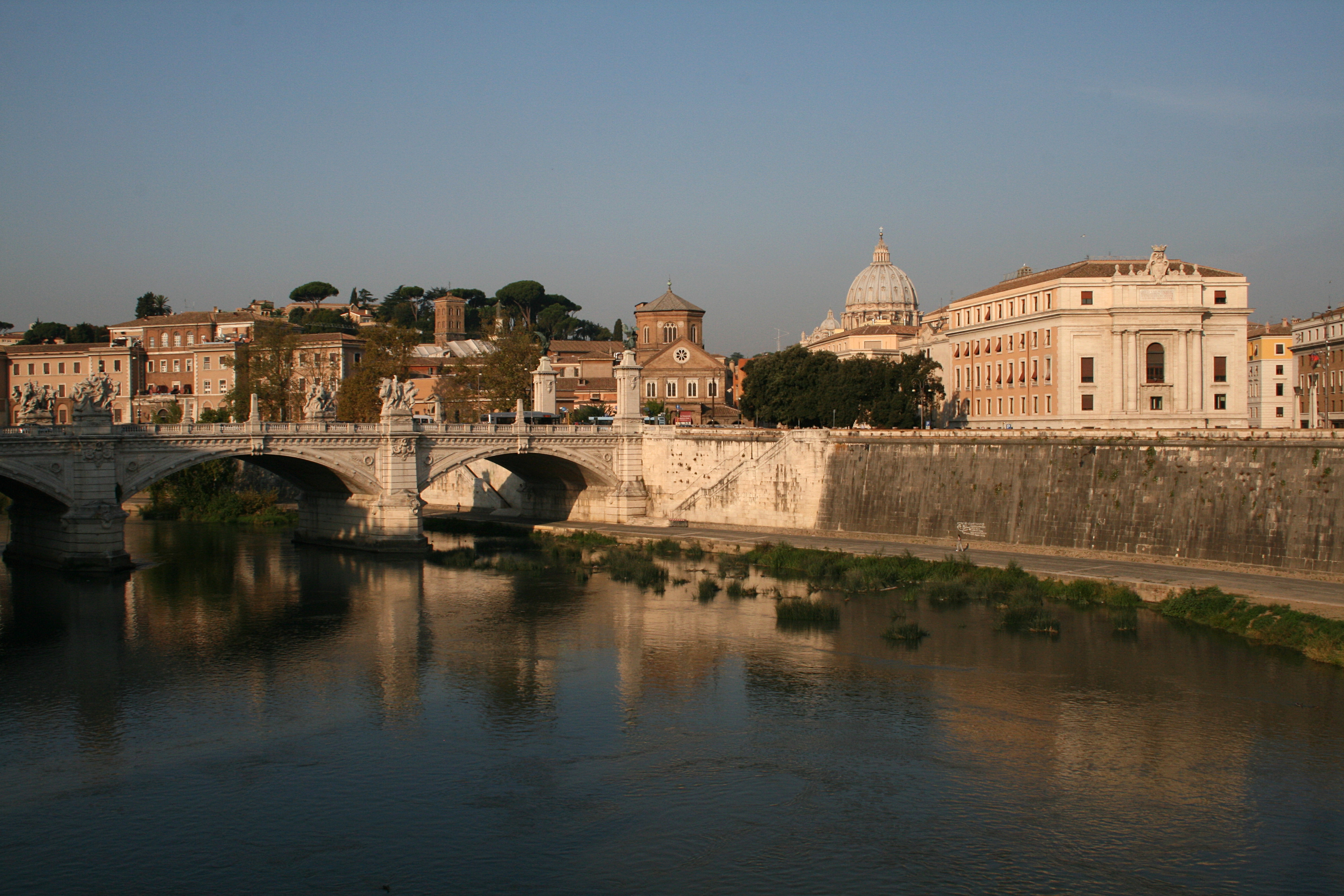
The expression refers to the Tiber which runs through Rome.

Following World War II, Hollywood studios increasingly shifted production abroad both to take advantage of lower costs and to use frozen funds (profits from American films which foreign governments barred from export). These films, known as runaway productions, could also benefit from local subsidies. By the early 1950s, some of the largest-budget American films were being shot in European countries, particularly in Britain and Italy. In both countries newly arrived American companies worked alongside continuing large-scale domestic film industries.

In Italy, the film-makers used the vast Cinecittà complex which had been built in the 1930s by Benito Mussolini's Fascist regime which was aiming to rebuild Italian cinema. Following Mussolini's overthrow in 1943, production at Cinecittà was suspended and no new films were made until 1948.

== Height ==
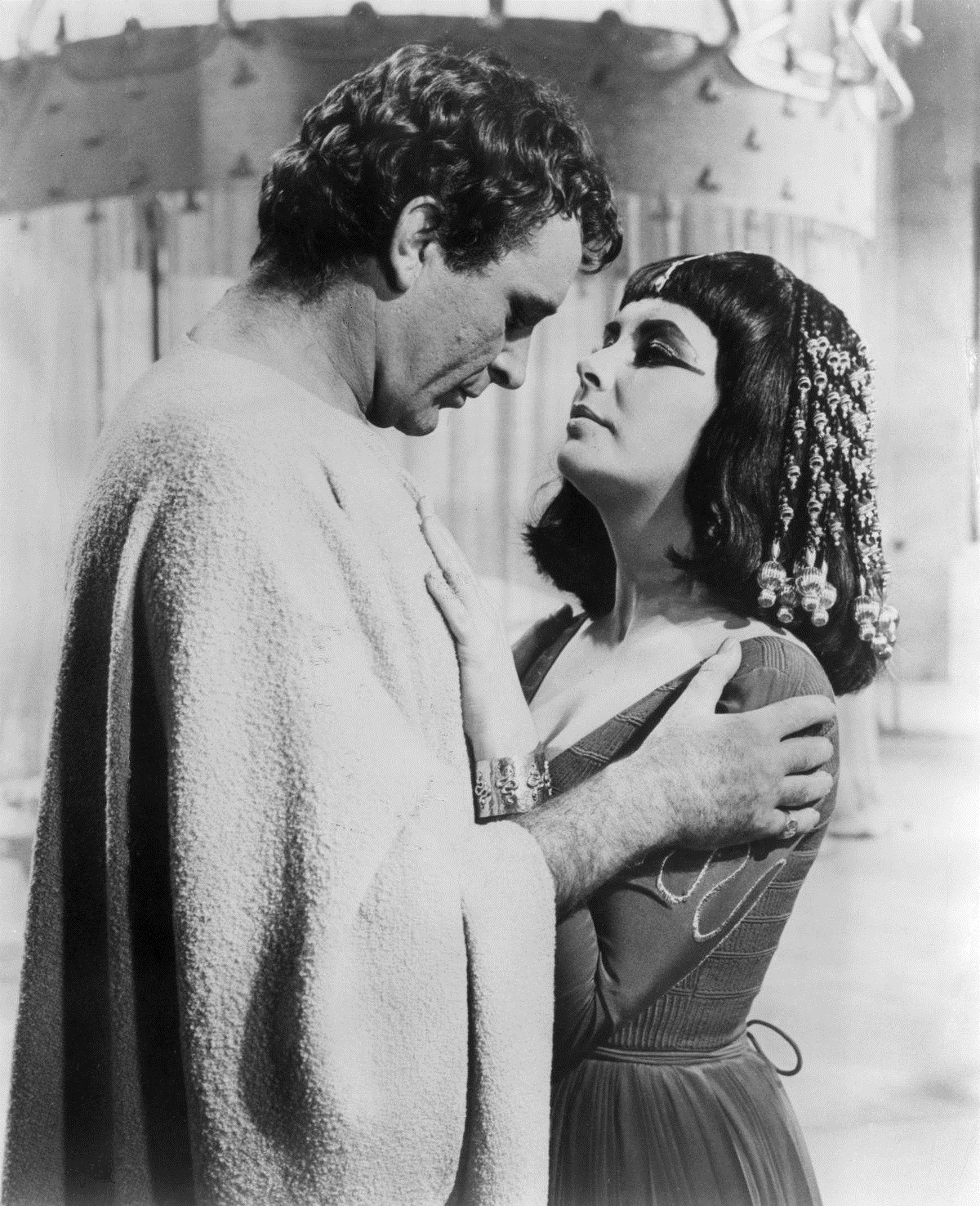
Richard Burton and Elizabeth Taylor in Cleopatra by Joseph L. Mankiewicz (1963)

Although American companies had shot in Italy before (such as Fox's 1922 silent Nero and MGM's 1925 Ben-Hur: A Tale of the Christ), the scale of the post-war investment was unprecedented. Many of the films were sword and sandal epics, often set in Ancient Rome which required large film sets and location filming. Other films included contemporary-set romances Roman Holiday (1953) and Three Coins in the Fountain (1954). The companies hired actors from Britain and the United States, and elsewhere, who appeared alongside Italians who generally played smaller, supporting roles or extras. Sophia Loren was one Italian star with sufficient international appeal to be cast in a leading role.

In 1962, the lengthy and troubled production of Cleopatra brought further media attention to the city. The delays led to a spiraling budget, making it the most expensive film ever made at the time.

Far from leading to a decline in Italian cinema, the native industry boomed during the era. In 1960, Italian films outperformed American imports to Italy for the first time since 1946. However, there was a growing influence of Hollywood-style productions, as popular Italian genres such as the Sword-and-sandal and Spaghetti Western attempted to imitate successful Hollywood productions. Italian actors and directors often adopted English-sounding names.

== Later years ==
Cinecittà was at the peak of its international fame between the production of Ben Hur and Cleopatra (1958–1960). As the 1960s drew on, the fashion for classical epics began to decline following the commercial failure of The Fall of the Roman Empire (1964), although films in other genres such as David Lean's Doctor Zhivago (1965) continued to be profitable.

In 2009 a documentary film Hollywood on the Tiber was released. It portrays Cinecittà and the various stars who worked there between 1950 and 1970.

== Selected filmography ==
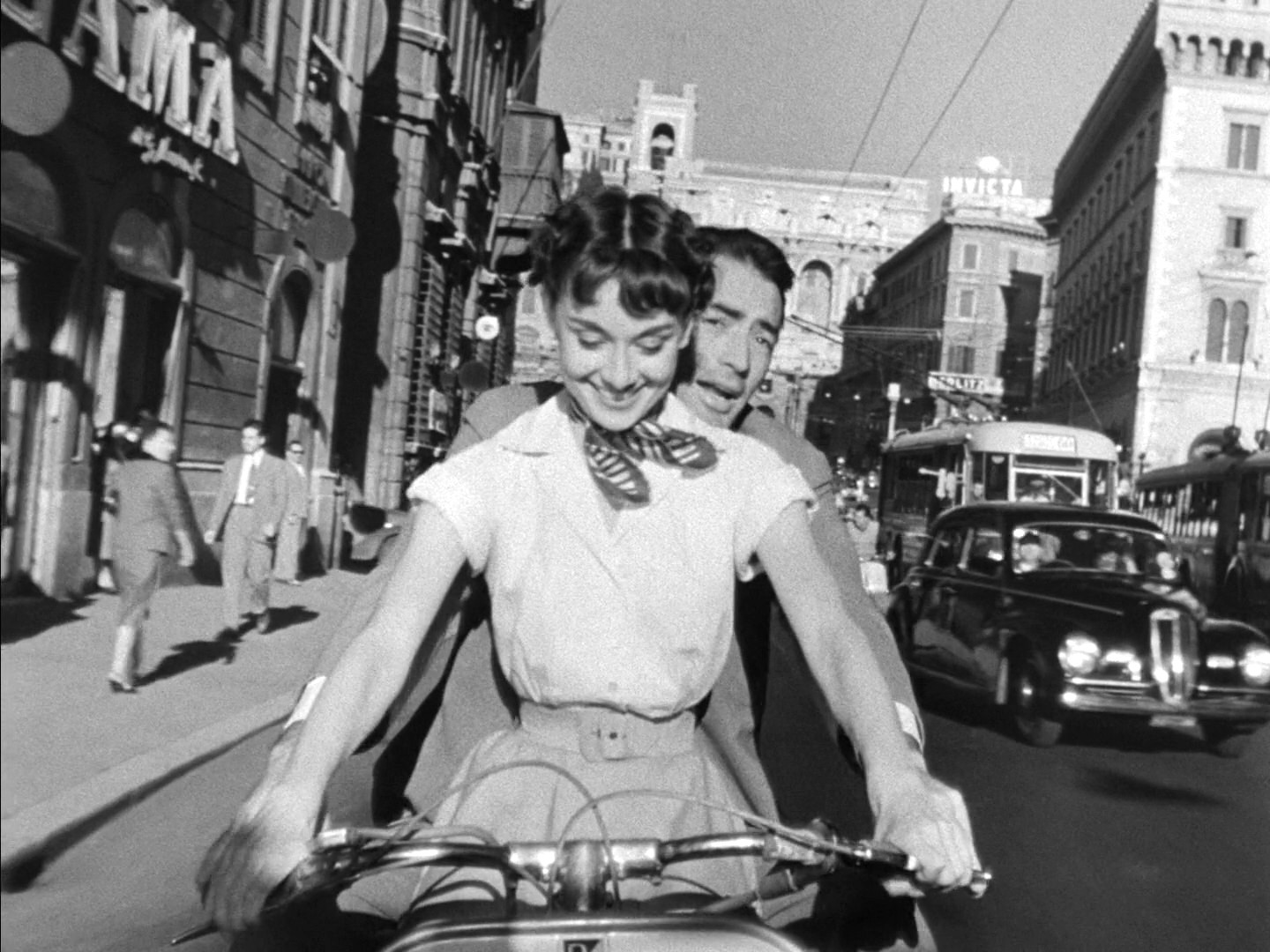
Roman Holiday with Gregory Peck and Audrey Hepburn

- Quo Vadis (1951)
- Roman Holiday (1953)
- Three Coins in the Fountain (1954)
- The Barefoot Contessa (1954)
- War and Peace (1956)
- Helen of Troy (1956)
- The Little Hut (1957)
- Boy on a Dolphin (1957)
- The Naked Maja (1958)
- Ben-Hur (1959)
- It Started in Naples (1960)
- The Angel Wore Red (1960)
- Cleopatra (1963)
- Jason and the Argonauts (1963)
- The Pink Panther (1963)
- The Fall of the Roman Empire (1964)
- The Agony and the Ecstasy (1965)

== Bibliography ==
- Balio, Tino. The Foreign Film Renaissance on American Screens, 1946–1973. Univ of Wisconsin Press, 5 Nov 2010.
- Bondanella, Peter. A History of Italian Cinema. Continuum, 2009.
- Gundle, Stephen. Mussolini's Dream Factory: Film Stardom in Fascist Italy. Berghahn Books, 2013.
- McElhaney, Joe. The Death of Classical Cinema: Hitchcock, Lang, Minnelli. SUNY Press, 2012.
- Torriglia, Anna Maria. Broken Time, Fragmented Space: A Cultural Map for Postwar Italy. University of Toronto Press, 2002.
- Wrigley, Richard (ed.) Cinematic Rome. Troubador Publishing, 2008.
