= Jessica (film) =

1962 film by Jean Negulesco

- Directed by: Jean Negulesco
- Written by: Ennio De Concini; Edith Sommer
- Story by: Flora Sundström
- Starring: Maurice Chevalier; Angie Dickinson; Sylva Koscina
- Cinematography: Piero Portalupi
- Edited by: Marie-Sophie Dubus; Renzo Lucidi
- Music by: Mario Nascimbene
- Production companies: Dear Film Produzione; Les Films Ariane
- Distributed by: United Artists
- Release date: May 1962
- Running time: 112 minutes
- Countries: France; Italy; United States
- Language: English

Jessica is a 1962 comedy drama film directed by Jean Negulesco, starring Maurice Chevalier, Angie Dickinson and Sylva Koscina, with cinematography by Piero Portalupi and art direction by Giulio Bongini. It was a co-production between France, Italy and the United States. Location shooting took place around Forza d'Agrò on Sicily.

== Plot ==
When her husband dies in Sicily while on their honeymoon, Jessica, a nurse, decides to remain there rather than return home and becomes a midwife in the village of Forza d'Agrò.

Men of the town pay quite a bit of attention to the attractive Jessica, causing women to resent her presence. While she at times welcomes their attentions, she has a strict rule to never get involved with any man who has any standing attachment to another woman. The wives conspire to abstain from relations with their husbands, reasoning that if no babies are born, no midwife is needed. Parish priest Father Antonio disapproves of their scheme.

Jessica develops a romantic interest in Edmondo Raumo, a marchese who has been a recluse since being injured during the war. Raumo lies about his true identity, telling Jessica that he is a humble fisherman. She becomes angry when the truth is finally known and intends to leave Sicily forever. However, a villager who has been kind to her is dying, and the situation brings her closer to Raumo. At the end of the story, the wives of the town have accepted her, and renewed relations with their husbands, leading to a baby boom. And when she comes to the church during mass, to announce the birth of twins, she sits next to Edmundo, on his ceremonial bench near the altar—indicating she is now Marchesa Raumo.

== Cast ==
- Maurice Chevalier as Father Antonio
- Angie Dickinson as Jessica
- Noël-Noël as Old Crupi
- Gabriele Ferzetti as Edmondo Raumo
- Sylva Koscina as Nunzia Tuffi
- Agnes Moorehead as Maria Lombardo
- Marcel Dalio as Luigi Tuffi
- Danielle De Metz as Nicolina Lombardo
- Antonio Cifariello as Gianni Crupi
- Kerima as Virginia Toriello
- Carlo Croccolo as Beppi Toriello
- Georgette Anys as Mamma Parigi
- Rossana Rory as Rosa Masudino
- Alberto Rabagliati as Pietro Masudino
- Marina Berti as Filippella Risino
- Gianni Musy as Filippo Casabranca
