= United States Marine Band (film) =

1942 film

- Directed by: Jean Negulesco
- Produced by: Gordon Hollingshead
- Starring: United States Marine Band
- Cinematography: Ted D. McCord
- Distributed by: Warner Bros.
- Release date: November 14, 1942
- Running time: 10 minutes
- Country: United States
- Language: English

United States Marine Band is a 1942 American short documentary film directed by Jean Negulesco, featuring the United States Marine Band. It was nominated for an Academy Award at the 15th Academy Awards for Best Short Subject (One-Reel).

== Cast ==
- USMC Band director – William F. Santelmann
- Commandant of the USMC – General Thomas Holcomb
