= The Best of Everything (TV series) =

- Created by: James Lipton
- Starring: Geraldine Fitzgerald; Gale Sondergaard; Patty McCormack
- Theme music composer: James Lipton; Laurence Rosenthal
- Composer: Mario Litwin
- Country of origin: United States
- No. of episodes: 126

Production
- Executive producer: James Lipton
- Running time: 30 minutes
- Production companies: 20th Century Fox Television; FMC Productions

Original release
- Network: ABC
- Release: March 30 – September 25, 1970

The Best of Everything is an American daytime soap opera which aired on ABC from March 30, 1970, to September 25, 1970. The series was a spin-off of Rona Jaffe's 1958 novel The Best of Everything and the 1959 film of the same name.

== Plot ==
The show focuses upon four young secretaries and their lives in an intense publishing firm: Linda, April, Kim, and Barbara. They were tormented by their ruthless head editor, Amanda Key, and counseled by the warm and loving Violet Jordan. Although the soap opera was short-lived, there were several plotlines, including Kim being brutally attacked by a mysterious villain named Squirrel. The series also revolved around Barbara, who had become depressed since her marriage failed.

== Production history ==
The soap opera premiered on March 30, 1970, at 12 Noon Eastern time (11 a.m. Central). The Best of Everything replaced reruns of Bewitched and premiered alongside A World Apart on ABC, which followed it at 12:30/11:30. However, the original version of Jeopardy!, hosted by Art Fleming then, was at the height of its popularity on NBC at that point, and The Best of Everything, much like its CBS competition, Where the Heart Is, made practically no impact upon the ratings. ABC ran it for the then-minimum six months before canceling. This had also been the fate of an NBC serial that aired the previous year, Hidden Faces. Later in the 1970s, these failures, along with a few others, prompted networks to opt instead for expansion of some of their existing 30-minute serials to a full hour each day, minimizing the risk of new programs taking an overly long time to develop an audience.

The series was executive produced by creator/headwriter James Lipton. Jacqueline Babbin was the producer. The packager was 20th Century Fox Television, in association with ABC. The Best of Everything was videotaped at ABC-TV Studio 17 in New York City.

The series' opening and closing credits used a video shot of seagulls in flight over New York Harbor. Nashville artist Connie Eaton recorded a version of the series' instrumental theme, using lyrics which she sang on an episode telecast near the end of the program's network run. The single was released in 1970 by the Chart label. Both the theme song's melody and lyrics were composed by headwriter James Lipton.

== Cast ==
- Geraldine Fitzgerald as Violet Jordan
- Gale Sondergaard as Amanda Key
- Patty McCormack as Linda Warren
- Julie Mannix as April Morrison #1
- Susan Sullivan as April Morrison #2
- Katherine Glass as Kim Jordan
- Rochelle Oliver as Barbara Lamont
- Ginnie Curtis as Gwenn Mitchell
- Gregory Rozakis as Squirrel
- Victor Arnold as Ed Peronne
- Barry Ford as Ken Lamont
- Stephen Grover as Johnny Lamont
- M'el Dowd as Kate Farrow
- Ted LePlat as Randy Wilson
- Diane Kagan as Anne Carter
- James Davidson as Dexter Key
- Bonnie Bee Buzzard as Joanna Key

== Ratings ==
The 1969-70 season was the zenith of the soap opera format in the United States, as a record 19 soaps crowded the three major networks. Unfortunately, The Best of Everything was the worst in the Nielsens, coming in at the bottom with an awful 1.8 rating, one of the lowest figures ever recorded for an American soap opera. One reason for the show's failure was its time slot: 12 noon Eastern Time (11am Central), in which it competed against the original run of Jeopardy! on NBC, then at the height of its daytime popularity.

1969-1970 Season

- 1. As the World Turns 13.6
- 2. The Edge of Night 10.8
- 3. Search for Tomorrow 10.0
- 13. Where the Heart Is 7.0 (aired on CBS in the same time slot)
- 19. The Best of Everything 1.8
