= Coins in the Fountain (novel) =

1952 novel by John H. Secondari

- First edition
- Author: John Hermes Secondari
- Language: English
- Publisher: Lippincott
- Publication date: October 22, 1952
- Publication place: United States
- Media type: Print (hardback & paperback)
- Pages: 320 pp (first edition, hardcover)

Coins in the Fountain is the 1952 debut novel of John Hermes Secondari, published by Lippincott in 1952.

Coins in the Fountain was adapted the 1954 Academy Award-winning film, Three Coins in the Fountain. It was remade in 1964 as the Oscar-nominated film The Pleasure Seekers and again in 1990 as Coins in the Fountain.
