= John H. Secondari =

American writer

John Hermes Secondari (November 1, 1919 – February 8, 1975) was an American author and television producer.

Secondari's 1952 novel Coins in the Fountain was made into the 1954 Academy Award-winning film Three Coins in the Fountain, and then in 1964, to his disappointment, remade as the Twentieth Century-Fox film The Pleasure Seekers. He went on to write plays for Playhouse 90 and was the founding Washington Bureau Chief and White House Correspondent for the ABC Television Network. In 1963, he produced the Emmy-nominated and Peabody Award-winning ABC television series Saga of Western Man.

== Biography ==
John H. Secondari was born in 1919 in Rome, Italy. In May 1924, he emigrated to the United States with his mother, Linda Secondari, on board the S.S. Providence, which sailed from Naples, Italy, and arrived at the Port of New York on June 4, whereupon they were immediately detained at Ellis Island as being in "excess of quota". They were released on June 11 and settled in Framingham, Massachusetts. According to the passenger list, John Secondari was born in Rome. He was delivered by his father, Epaminonda Secondari, the last surviving founding member of the American College of Cardiology. John Secondari received a Bachelor of Arts degree from Fordham University in 1939 and an M.S. in Journalism from Columbia University in 1940. He joined the U.S. Army in 1941 and commanded a reconnaissance unit and a tank company in combat during World War II in France, Germany, and Austria. He was honorably discharged in 1946 with the rank of captain.

Secondari married Rita Hume in 1948, but she died in a car accident in Mallorca, Spain. They had a son, John Gerry. In 1961, John H. married Helen Jean Rogers, with whom he co-produced Saga of Western Man. They had a daughter, Linda Helen. Secondari started his own production company in 1969. He died of a heart attack at the age of 55 in New York City.

== Filmography ==
- 1951 - Goodyear Television Playhouse (episode writer)
- 1954 - Three Coins in the Fountain (novel)
- 1957 - The Alcoa Hour - "Hostages to Fortune" (episode writer)
- 1957 - Open Hearing (TV series - moderator)
- 1963 - Saga of Western Man (producer, writer)
- 1964 - The Pleasure Seekers (novel)
- 1967 - Christ Is Born (1967) (producer)
- 1969 - The Ellis Island Experience (1969) (producer)
- 1990 - Coins in the Fountain (novel)

== Bibliography ==
- 1952 - Coins in the Fountain (novel)
- 1954 - Temptation for a King (novel)
- 1955 - Spinner of the Dream (novel)
