= New York Times Youth Forum =

American TV public affairs series (1952–1953)

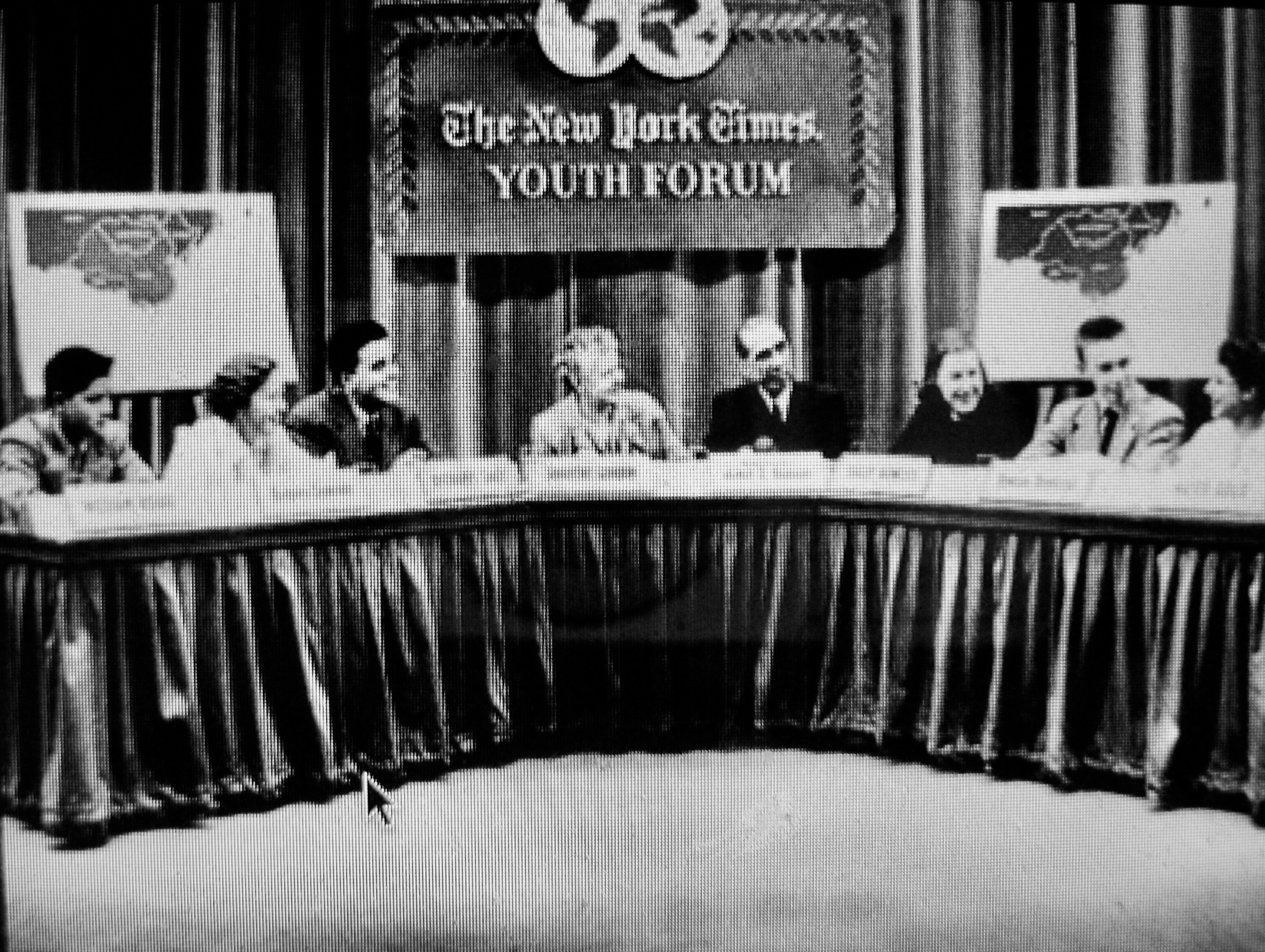
- Publicity shot
- Created by: Al Hollander; Arnee Nocks
- Presented by: Dorothy Gordon
- Country of origin: United States

Production
- Running time: 60 minutes

Original release
- Network: DuMont
- Release: September 14, 1952 – June 14, 1953

New York Times Youth Forum is a public affairs program, sponsored by The New York Times and aired Sundays at 5pm EST (another source says 6 p.m.) on the now-defunct DuMont Television Network from September 14, 1952, to June 14, 1953. The host was Dorothy Gordon (born Dorothy Lerner, 1889–1970), who continued to host the show on WABD from the time the network closed in 1956 until 1958 when it moved to WRCA-TV).

The Times dropped sponsorship in 1960, at which point radio simulcasts moved from WQXR (AM) to WNBC (AM). Thereafter, Gordon continued the show as Dorothy Gordon's Youth Forum, winning a Peabody Award in 1966. Gordon continued to host the show until her death in 1970. The show also appeared first-run as late as April 23, 1967 (with guest Otto Preminger) on WNBC-TV.

Al Hollander was the producer.

== Episode status ==
One episode, "Will the Election Affect Foreign Policy?" (broadcast September 28, 1952), survives at the Paley Center for Media.

== See also ==
- List of programs broadcast by the DuMont Television Network
- List of surviving DuMont Television Network broadcasts
- 1952-53 United States network television schedule

== Bibliography ==
- David Weinstein, The Forgotten Network: DuMont and the Birth of American Television (Philadelphia: Temple University Press, 2004) ISBN 1-59213-245-6
- Tim Brooks and Earle Marsh, The Complete Directory to Prime Time Network TV Shows, Third edition (New York: Ballantine Books, 1964) ISBN 0-345-31864-1
- Charles Sopkin, Seven Glorious Days, Seven Fun-filled Nights, First edition (New York, Simon & Schuster, 1968, Library of Congress catalog card number 68-25754, pp. 64–66.
