= The Pleasure Seekers (1964 film) =

1964 film by Jean Negulesco

- Theatrical release poster
- Directed by: Jean Negulesco
- Screenplay by: Edith Sommer
- Based on: Coins in the Fountain by John H. Secondari
- Produced by: David Weisbart
- Starring: Ann-Margret; Tony Franciosa; Carol Lynley; Gardner McKay; Pamela Tiffin
- Cinematography: Daniel L. Fapp
- Edited by: Louis R. Loeffler
- Music by: Lionel Newman
- Distributed by: 20th Century Fox
- Release date: December 25, 1964
- Running time: 107 minutes
- Country: United States
- Languages: English; Spanish
- Budget: $2.1 million
- Box office: $2 million

The Pleasure Seekers is a 1964 American musical romantic comedy film directed by Jean Negulesco from a screenplay by Edith Sommer, based on the 1952 novel Coins in the Fountain by John H. Secondari. The film stars Ann-Margret, Tony Franciosa, Carol Lynley, Gardner McKay, and Pamela Tiffin, with Gene Tierney (in her final film) and Brian Keith. Ann-Margret sings four songs composed by Sammy Cahn and Jimmy Van Heusen.

The film was nominated for an Academy Award for Best Scoring of Music – Adaptation or Treatment for Lionel Newman and Alexander Courage.

== Plot ==
Susie Higgins arrives in Madrid and moves in with her friend Maggie Williams and Maggie's roommate Fran Hobson. Still a virgin, Susie is surprised to find both of the other girls have active dating lives. Secretary Maggie has recently ended an affair and is now seeing her married boss Paul Barton, much to the dismay of Paul's jealous wife Jane. At the same time, Maggie's co-worker Pete McCoy is in love with Maggie, who barely notices him. Fran, an aspiring actress, flamenco dancer and singer, eagerly pursues Spanish doctor Andres Brioñes. While at the Museo del Prado, Susie catches the eye of wealthy playboy Emilio Lacayo, who adds her to his already large group of girlfriends.

The three girls spend the summer attending various parties while pursuing and being pursued by the men in their lives. In the end, Maggie chooses McCoy over Barton, Dr. Brioñes settles down with Fran, and Lacayo with Susie. All of them decide to stay in Madrid.

== Cast ==
- Ann-Margret as Fran Hobson
- Carol Lynley as Maggie Williams
- Pamela Tiffin as Susie Higgins
- Tony Franciosa as Emilio Lacayo
- Gardner McKay as Pete McCoy
- André Lawrence as Dr. Andres Briones
- Brian Keith as Paul Barton
- Gene Tierney as Jane Barton
- Vito Scotti as neighbor man
- Isobel Elsom as Dona Teresa Lacayo
- Maurice Marsac as Jose
- Shelby Grant as Marian
- Raoul De Leon as Martinez
- Antonio Gades as Flamenco dancer
- Emilio Diego as guitarist

== Production ==
The film was announced in February 1964. The announced cast originally included, alongside Ann-Margret and Carol Lynley, James Darren, George Chakiris, Paula Prentiss, Efrem Zimbalist Jr., and Dina Merrill. Later, Adam West and Donna Michelle were announced in the cast, but eventually dropped out. Pamela Tiffin initially refused the film, but ultimately had to accept it for contractual obligations.

Negulsesco said the film would be different from the earlier one: "Instead of Rome, this picture is set in Madrid. Instead of three girls and three men, I'm using four. Naturally, the problems of American girls living in Madrid are similar to those in Three Coins, but this is 1964, so we'll have more difficulties."

Ann-Margret was paid $2,000 a week over ten weeks. This was less than she received for other studios, but she had an old commitment to Fox.

Filming started in May with Brian Keith being a later addition to the cast. Irene Tsu appeared in an uncredited role. The role of Shelby Grant was heavily cut.

Interiors were shot at on Fox sound stages, while exteriors were filmed on location in Madrid, Barcelona, Toledo, Segovia and the Costa del Sol. Several scenes were shot in the Museo del Prado in Madrid. After some production delays, Dina Merrill left the project and was replaced by Gene Tierney, who still owed Fox one final film under her contract. The filming was reportedly tense, with widespread dissatisfaction among the actors over the script, several heavy confrontations between Tony Franciosa and Negulesco, and rivalry among the female leads. Notably, at one point, Ann-Margret declined to pose for publicity photos alongside her co-stars Lynley and Tiffin.

== Reception ==
According to Fox records, the film needed to earn $3,900,000 in film rentals to break even and made $3,205,000 by December 11, 1970 (equivalent to $19.9 million in 2024), meaning it lost money.

Filmink argued, "The film is fun but hampered by the fact Ann-Margret’s the only lead actor who can sing and dance, and it’s, well, a musical." In a retrospective analysis, Tom Lisanti noted the film is "well produced" and with "a bouncy musical score", even if "the camp quotient is revved due to some bad dialogue, lively musical numbers à la Ann-Margret, and actors who would rather be making any movie but this".
