= Open Hearing (American TV program) =

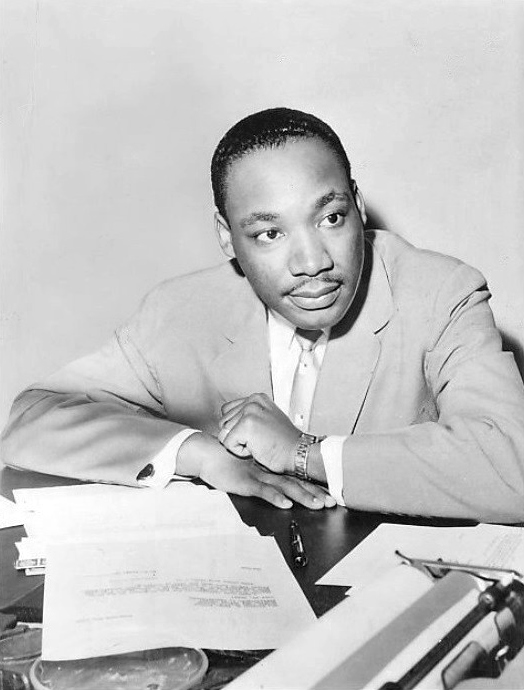
- Publicity photo of Rev. Dr. Martin Luther King Jr. for his appearance on Open Hearing, June 16, 1957.
- Presented by: John Secondari
- Country of origin: United States
- Original language: English

Production
- Running time: 60 minutes

Original release
- Network: ABC
- Release: 1957 – 1958

Open Hearing is a 1957–58 American news-related talk show, with John H. Secondari as the moderator. It was a 60-minute program that aired Sunday evenings from 5–6 p.m. on the ABC television network. It began on February 3, 1957, as a 30-minute program on Sundays at 8:30 p.m. Martin Agronsky, John Edwards, Edward P. Morgan, and Richard Rendell formed a panel to interview newsmakers, and film was shown to bring major news of the week up to date.

Richard Stratton was the director.

A previous version of Open Hearing had aired in 1954, moderated by John Daly.

== Critical response ==
A review of the premiere episode in the trade publication Variety called Open Hearing "an illuminating and informative half-hour". It complimented Secondari's work as moderator and the "spontaneous quality" of the interviews.
