= Television Information Office =

US television promotion organization

The Television Information Office (TIO) was created by the National Association of Broadcasters in the United States in October 1959. The creation of the TIO was part of a public relations campaign to undo some of the damage done by the quiz show controversies of the 1950s and other illicit business practices in television like plugola. The TIO headquarters were initially set up in New York. TIO received sponsorships from networks and television stations who wanted to help present a positive image of television to the public.

== Projects ==
The first project of the TIO was an Elmo Roper survey on public reactions to television following the quiz show scandals in the late 1950s. The TIO published other reports following the Elmo Roper survey, with similar objectives. TIO also created a library, created television program study guides for elementary and secondary schools, and ran expensive ads in popular magazines including the New Yorker and Saturday Review. All of these actions were used to convince political and social leaders that television had the potential to greatly benefit America.
