= The Best of Everything (novel) =

1958 novel by Rona Jaffe

- First edition cover
- Author: Rona Jaffe
- Language: English
- Publisher: Simon & Schuster
- Publication date: September 2, 1958
- Publication place: United States
- Media type: Print

The Best of Everything (1958) is Rona Jaffe's first novel. It is the story of five young employees of a New York publishing company.

== Development history ==
The novel was one of the first to be bought for film adaptation before the manuscript had been edited so the film company would be involved in the marketing of the book. It was also one of the first novels to use the author as a marketing tool—complete with full-color jacket photography of author Rona Jaffe by photographer Philippe Halsman.

== Adaptations ==
In 1959, the novel was adapted into a film of the same name released by Twentieth Century Fox directed by Jean Negulesco and starring Diane Baker, Hope Lange, Stephen Boyd, Suzy Parker, Robert Evans, Brian Aherne and Joan Crawford. Longtime Fox music director Alfred Newman wrote the final musical score of his contract with the studio for the film.

The novel was also adapted into a soap opera of the same name written by James Lipton. The show aired on ABC from March 30 to September 25, 1970.

An off-Broadway play adaptation of the novel, adapted and directed by Julie Kramer, opened in October 2012 at HERE Arts Center in New York.

The book appears in season 1 episode 6 of the American period drama television Mad Men (2007). The main character, Donald Draper, is reading the book, lying on his bed, telling his wife that he finds it fascinating. His wife agrees, adding that the book is "better than the Hollywood version." Don finds it "dirtier." The scene suggests that the writers of Mad Men, which is all about advertising, paid tribute to the novel.
