= Saga of Western Man =

- Created by: John H. Secondari; Helen Jean Rogers
- Country of origin: United States

Production
- Running time: 60 minutes

Original release
- Network: ABC
- Release: 1963 – 1969

Saga of Western Man is a historically themed anthology series television series that aired on ABC Television from 1963 to 1969. Each episode focused on a particular year, person, or incident that producer John H. Secondari felt significantly influenced the progress of Western civilization.

== Episode list ==
| Title | Directed by | Written by | Original release date |
|---|---|---|---|
| "1492" | Helen Jean Rogers | John H. Secondari | October 16, 1963 |
As presented on this show, that year was not only the copybook date for Columbus' passage to America, but it also marked the passage of Western Europe from the old world to the new. With John H. Secondari (Narrator), Fredric March (Christopher Columbus, voice)
| "1776" | Unknown | John H. Secondari | December 8, 1963 |
A re-creation of the events of 1776 that launched a world revolution. Filmed in Lexington, Concord, Boston, Philadelphia, and Williamsburg, as well as in England and France. With John H. Secondari (Narrator), Fredric March (Leading character, voice)
| "1898" | Helen Jean Rogers | John H. Secondari | March 29, 1964 |
Highlights include the relegation of Native American Indians to reservations; European immigration; the industrialization of America; "The Gilded Age" and J.P. Morgan, Andrew Carnegie, John D. Rockefeller, and William Vanderbilt; the Spanish-American War; Teddy Roosevelt and his Rough Riders; and the U.S. as a world power. With John H. Secondari (Narrator), Sidney Blackmer (Theodore Roosevelt, voice)
| "1964" | Warren Wallace | John H. Secondari | April 12, 1964 |
“… It is the year of our living … It is a time of problem, and crisis … During the next hour we will look at some aspects of our American life. Our focus is America, our accomplishments, but most importantly, our challenges … for we too are part of the Saga of Western Man.” With John H. Secondari (Narrator), John F. Kennedy, (voice)
| "I, Leonardo da Vinci" | Helen Jean Rogers & John H. Secondari | John H. Secondari | February 23, 1965 |
The life of Leonardo da Vinci, the 15th Century Italian whose all-around brilliance epitomized the Renaissance-Man. The episode contains the first documented usage of a quote misattributed to da Vinci, "And once you have tasted flight you will walk the earth with your eyes turned skyward, for there you have been, and there you would return." With John H. Secondari (Narrator), Fredric March (Leonardo da Vinci, voice)
| "The Pilgrim Adventure" | John H. Secondari & Helen Jean Rogers | John H. Secondari | May 10, 1965 |
Chronicle of the events leading up to and including the settling of the Plymouth Colony in 1620. Program highlights include a look at the lack of religious freedom under England's King James I, and the Pilgrims' flight to Holland, trans-Atlantic voyage, and interaction with the Indians. With Staats Cotsworth (William Bradford, voice)
| "I am a Soldier" | John F. Hughes | John H. Secondari | May 8, 1966 |
This program focuses on the American soldiers in "A" Company, 1st Battalion, 8th Cavalry, who were fighting in Vietnam. Highlights of this program include the U.S. Army installation at An Khe, 250 miles northeast of Saigon; Capt. Theodore Danielsen introduces himself to new company members, and advises them on how to protect themselves during their mission; diverse military activities and combat missions. With John H. Secondari (Narrator), Capt. Theodore Danielsen
| "Beethoven: Ordeal and Triumph" | Otto Lang | John H. Secondari | March 23, 1966 |
Includes the social climate of Vienna and Europe at the end of the 18th century, scenes of Beethoven’s natal home and the palace where his father was a musician. Beethoven’s establishment in Vienna, his gradual deafness and the music that he composed in spite of or possibly because of it. The program concludes with quotations from Beethoven about the connection between art and the human spirit. Performances by the Boston Symphony Orchestra and pianist Claude Frank are featured. With John H. Secondari (Narrator), David McCallum, (Ludwig van Beethoven, voice), Boston Symphony Orchestra, Claude Frank
| "The Legacy of Rome" | Unknown | Unknown | November 25, 1966 |
The achievements of Rome's civilization during the periods of Republic and Empire, which left a legacy of art, science and law. With Fredric March (Narrator)
| "Cortez and the Legend" | Helen Jean Rogers | Unknown | May 26, 1967 |
Filmed in Mexico, includes history and structure of the Aztec civilization; the legend of Quetzalcoatl; the beginning of Cortez's expedition, 1519; Moctezuma; Cortez's escape from the city of Tenochtitlan in 1520; and Cortez's capture of the city of Tenochtitlan in 1521. With John H. Secondari (Narrator), Kirk Douglas (The Spaniard, voice), David Carradine (The Aztec, voice)
| "Venice: City in Danger" | Helen Jean Rogers | John H. Secondari | February 7, 1968 |
The problem of the increasing encroachment of the surrounding seas, and the slow but sure sinking of the city into the mud. With John H. Secondari (Narrator)
| "Robert Scott and the Race for the South Pole" | John F. Hughes | John H. Secondari | May 17, 1968 |
The expedition from Cape Evans to the South Pole. With John H. Secondari (Narrator)
| "In the Name of God" | Helen Jean Rogers | John H. Secondari | May 20, 1968 |
Missionary life in the Micronesian Trust Territory and India. With John H. Secondari (Narrator)
| "Rehearsal for D-Day" | Helen Jean Rogers | John H. Secondari | June 4, 1968 |
The August 19, 1942, invasion of Dieppe in northern France and how the lessons of the raid's failure were used to prepare for D-Day. With John H. Secondari (Narrator), Winston Churchill, Lord Louis Mountbatten, Lord Lovat, correspondent John MacVane, Vice Adm. John Hughes-Hallett
| "The Road to Gettysburg" | John F. Hughes | John H. Secondari | December 9, 1968 |
Through the diaries and letters of soldier participants, the subject is the Battle of Gettysburg (July 1–3, 1863), which became the turning point of the Civil War. Includes life and society in 1860, slavery and the beginning of the war, military equipment and activities, the Emancipation Proclamation, eyewitness accounts of the battle, the Gettysburg Address and the Gettysburg Memorial. With John H. Secondari (Narrator); David Carradine (The Rebel, voice); Kevin McCarthy (The Yank, voice)
| "Christ is Born" | Helen Jean Rogers | Unknown | December 24, 1968 |
Story of the Nativity filmed in the Holy Land and Rome With John H. Secondari (Narrator), John Huston (Narrator)
| "Kitty Hawk to Paris: The Heroic Years" | Helen Jean Rogers | John H. Secondari | May 8, 1969 |
Includes an eyewitness account and footage of early flights of the Wright brothers; film director William Wellman on flying in World War I; planes and the postal service; Charles Lindbergh and the first solo, non-stop, transcontinental flight; aviator Jimmy Doolittle on his early flights. With John H. Secondari (Narrator), Charles Lindbergh, Jimmy Doolittle, William A. Wellman, the Wright brothers

== Awards ==
The series was honored with a Peabody Award in 1963.

The music of the series was nominated for Emmy Awards several times from 1964 to 1966. The nominated composers and performers included Ulpio Minucci, Joe Moon, Rayburn Wright, Erich Leinsdorf, and Claude Frank.
