= National Drivers Test =

Production
- Producer: Warren Bush
- Running time: 60 minutes

Original release
- Network: CBS
- Release: May 24, 1965

The National Drivers Test was a 1965 documentary television special in the United States on CBS hosted by Walter Cronkite and Mike Wallace, with follow-up tests in 1966 and 1967.

The test was an audience participation format. Over 65 million test forms were distributed across the country by many various organizations, and was published in many newspapers. The New York Times quipped that "anyone who hasn't received a form by now must not belong to anything." About 30 million people took part in the test. The program was prepared in cooperation with the National Safety Council and sponsored by Shell Oil Company.

The program presented five segments (filmed near Tampa, Florida) of types of common accidents, performed by stunt drivers including Joie Chitwood. Test takers answered true or false questions, or multiple choice questions, about each scenario. 2,000 test takers took the test during the show in person in four CBS studios (New York, Philadelphia, Chicago, and Los Angeles) for real-time electronic scoring.

CBS President Fred W. Friendly decided to develop the special after he was compelled to take a drivers' education course due to having many traffic violations, and failed the test, as did executive director Warren Bush.

The program first aired on May 24, 1965 (from 10pm to 11pm Eastern Time). It was the most viewed television program in the Nielsen Ratings for the two week May 24-June 6, 1965 period, with a 28.2 rating and 53 percent share. While the show was very popular, it was not without detractors. Some viewers with small televisions complained that they could not clearly see road hazards in the driving scenarios, and quibbled with the wording of some questions. The average score in the four studio audiences was 51 out of 80—Associated Press reporter Cynthia Lowry blamed this poor showing on the presentation instead of drivers' abilities.

Due to popular demand, including a reported desire of many test takers to improve their bad scores, the special was re-aired just before Labor Day 1965. Additional national tests were aired in 1966 (now in color, which CBS News had moved to) and 1967. By the time of the third test, the New York Times noted that the material was getting a bit repetitious, even though the series was an important service.

The program won a Peabody Award.

The success of the program generated other CBS "test" programs, including "The National Citizenship Test" (November 1965) and "The National Health Test" (January 1966).
