= Helen Jean Rogers =

American television producer

Helen Jean Rogers Secondari
- Born: Helen Jean Rogers; September 27, 1928; United States
- Died: March 28, 1998 (aged 69); New York City, New York, U.S.
- Occupation: Television producer
- Known for: Saga of Western Man
- Spouse: John H. Secondari (m. 1961)
- Children: 1 daughter, 1 stepson

Helen Jean Rogers Secondari (September 27, 1928 – March 28, 1998) was an American television producer. She won five Emmy Awards and two Peabody Awards with her fellow producer and husband John H. Secondari.

== Biography ==
Helen Jean Rogers graduated magna cum laude and Phi Beta Kappa from the Catholic University of America. She received a Master of Arts from Radcliffe College and became one of the first female teaching fellows at Harvard University.

In 1961, Rogers married John H. Secondari with whom she co-produced Saga of Western Man. They had a daughter, Linda Helen. In addition she was step-mother to John's son, John Gerry, from his previous marriage. She died on March 28, 1998, in New York City.

== Filmography ==
- 1961 - The Red and The Black (produced and reported by)
- 1963 - Saga of Western Man (producer)
- 1967 - Christ Is Born (director)
- 1968 - Rehearsal for D-Day (1967) (director)
