= The Best of Everything (film) =

1959 film by Jean Negulesco

- Theatrical release poster
- Directed by: Jean Negulesco
- Screenplay by: Edith Sommer; Mann Rubin
- Based on: The Best of Everything; 1958 novel by Rona Jaffe
- Produced by: Jerry Wald
- Starring: Hope Lange; Stephen Boyd; Suzy Parker; Martha Hyer; Diane Baker; Brian Aherne; Robert Evans; Louis Jourdan; Joan Crawford
- Cinematography: William C. Mellor
- Edited by: Robert Simpson
- Music by: Alfred Newman
- Color process: DeLuxe Color
- Distributed by: 20th Century-Fox
- Release date: October 9, 1959 (United States)
- Running time: 121 minutes
- Country: United States
- Language: English
- Budget: $1,965,000

The Best of Everything is a 1959 American drama film directed by Jean Negulesco from a screenplay by Edith Sommer and Mann Rubin, based on the 1958 novel of the same name by Rona Jaffe. It stars Hope Lange, Stephen Boyd, Suzy Parker, Martha Hyer, Diane Baker, Brian Aherne, Robert Evans, Louis Jourdan, and Joan Crawford. The film follows the professional careers and private lives of three women who share a small apartment in New York City and work together at a paperback publishing firm. Alfred Newman wrote the musical score, the last under his longtime contract as 20th Century-Fox's musical director.

== Plot ==
Recent Radcliffe College graduate Caroline Bender is hired as a secretary at Fabian Publishing Company. She works for Amanda Farrow, a bitter, demanding, jealous middle-aged editor who resents Caroline and suspects she wants her job. Amanda is having an affair with a married man, and it is not going well. Caroline meets two other young women in the typing pool — April Morrison, a naïve, enthusiastic girl from Colorado, and Gregg Adams, a glamorous aspiring actress. They invite Caroline, who is commuting from her family's home In Connecticut, to share their tiny apartment.

Caroline, upset after her fiancé Eddie Harris marries another woman, goes on a blind date with Paul Landers, arranged by their mothers. The date ends awkwardly when Caroline spots a co-worker, Mike Rice. After Paul leaves, Mike and Caroline get drunk, and she falls asleep at his apartment. At the office the next day, a badly hungover Caroline is worried she and Mike had sex, but he assures her nothing happened.

While working for Amanda Farrow, Caroline adds her own editorial comments to the manuscripts submitted by writers. Shalimar takes notice of Caroline's comments and promotes her to the position of manuscript reader. When Caroline thanks Farrow for recommending her as a reader, Farrow admits she advised Shalimar not to promote her. Later Mike disparages Caroline's ambition and advises her not to become career-driven, but to seek marriage instead.

April is assigned to work for the lecherous editor-in-chief, Mr. Shalimar, who persuades her to work late one night in a ploy to seduce her. When she rejects him, he is undaunted and also continues to pursue other young female employees. At an alcohol-fueled office party, an intoxicated Mr. Shalimar makes sexual overtures to Barbara Lamont while they are alone in her office. Sidney Carter, a co-worker with whom she is having an affair, intervenes after he hears Barbara yelling. Shalimar shows no remorse over the incident and suggests that, because Lamont has been married and divorced, she should expect such advances from male co-workers.

Gregg is cast in a play directed by David Savage and the two become lovers. Gregg is demoted to understudy when she repeatedly flubs her lines. She becomes obsessed with David, and she is eventually replaced in the play. After David ends his affair with Gregg, she becomes mentally unstable and starts stalking him. While lurking outside his apartment, she is startled by a boisterous neighbor and panics. Gregg flees to a fire escape and falls to her death when her high-heeled shoe gets caught in the grating.

April meets Dexter Key, a spoiled playboy, at a company picnic. They start to date, and Dexter threatens to dump the romantic April unless she agrees to have sex. When April becomes pregnant, Dexter persuades her to elope. Once they are en route, Dexter admits his marriage proposal is a ruse: He is driving her to a doctor for an abortion. Distraught at the idea of ending her pregnancy, April leaps from Dexter's moving car. She survives, but the impact causes a miscarriage and hospitalization. April becomes romantically involved with her attending physician.

Mike and Caroline consider becoming involved romantically, but their plans are interrupted by Eddie, who dines with Caroline while in New York on a business trip. Thinking Eddie wants to leave his wife and marry her, Caroline visits his hotel room; she leaves after Eddie reveals he has no intention of divorcing his rich wife and only wants Caroline to be his mistress.

When Farrow quits her job to marry and move to St. Louis, Caroline takes her place at Fabian. Caroline relinquishes the position when Farrow returns to New York after her marriage fails because, she tells Caroline, she no longer had enough to give.

While leaving the office one day, Caroline bumps into Mike on the street. She removes the hat she is wearing and locks eyes with him; they walk away together as the film ends.

== Cast ==
- Hope Lange as Caroline Bender
- Stephen Boyd as Mike Rice
- Suzy Parker as Gregg Adams
- Martha Hyer as Barbara Lamont
- Diane Baker as April Morrison
- Brian Aherne as Fred Shalimar
- Robert Evans as Dexter Key
- Brett Halsey as Eddie Harris
- Donald Harron as Sidney Carter
- June Blair as Brenda
- Sue Carson as Mary Agnes
- Linda Hutchings as Jane
- Lionel Kane as Paul Landers
- Ted Otis as Dr. Ronnie Wood
- Louis Jourdan as David Savage
- Joan Crawford as Amanda Farrow

== Production ==
20th Century Fox producer Jerry Wald announced he was buying the rights to the novel of the same name in April 1958. In his first interview about the film adaption, Wald said: "There are 10 roles in this for young people, and I hope to get some of our outstanding actors such as Lee Remick, Hope Lange, Diane Varsi, Suzy Parker, Robert Evans, Lee Philips and Bob Wagner." In further early casting considerations, Wald mentioned Joanne Woodward, Audrey Hepburn, Lauren Bacall and Margaret Truman. Rona Jaffe officially sold the rights to her book for $100,000 in November 1958. She did not want any part in writing the screenplay, but instead wanted a cameo role: "I want to appear in the movie in a walk-on part. I would just appear briefly as one of the office's pool of stenographers," she said.

Martin Ritt initially was set to direct, but he was replaced by Jean Negulesco in January 1959 reportedly because Ritt was upset with the casting of Suzy Parker. Ritt dismissed this rumor, saying the script was not his "cup of tea." When she learned that Wald was sick, Parker agreed to do the film, reporting for work in January 1959. (Parker had agreed to take the role in the summer of 1958, but a broken arm and a 14-month recovery delayed her appearance.) On playing a neurotic actress, Parker commented: "I know the type extremely well."

During casting, several actors were considered, cast and replaced. In August 1958, Diane Varsi and Lee Remick were, along with Suzy Parker, attached to star in the film, but Varsi and Remick withdrew. Remick was forced to leave production in early 1959 due to physical problems. In September 1958, Julia Meade signed on for the film, planning to make her screen debut. She ultimately did not appear in the film. In January 1959, the unknown actress Diane Hartman was cast as Barbara Lamont, but she was replaced by Martha Hyer. Jack Warden agreed to a co-starring role in March 1959, but he did not appear in the film. Less than a month later, Jean Peters was planning to make her comeback in this film. Had Peters not been replaced, it would have been her fifth film under the direction of Negulesco. Another actress cast in March 1959 without appearing in the film was June Blair, who was set to play one of the starring roles.

Joan Crawford was cast in May 1959, 10 days before shooting began. This was the first time she had accepted a supporting role since the silent era. Crawford was in heavy debt after the death of her fourth husband Alfred Steele, and needed the money. She commented on her role: "I'm on the screen only seven minutes. But I liked the part, and I want to do other movies and TV films if I can find what I want." She had recently been elected to the board of directors of Pepsi-Cola and planned to spend more time promoting the soft drink. Crawford insisted on having a Pepsi-Cola machine placed in the secretaries' break room in the film. According to Diane Baker, much of Crawford's character was cut from the finished film, including a show-stopping drunk scene. This was reportedly due to the film's length.

== Music ==
The score was composed and conducted by Alfred Newman, with orchestrations by Earle Hagen and Herbert Spencer. Additional development of Newman's themes were done by Cyril Mockridge for two scenes. The songs "Again" and "Kiss Them for Me" (by Lionel Newman) and "Something's Gotta Give" (by Johnny Mercer) are used as source music.

The title song for the film was composed by Newman, with lyrics by Sammy Cahn, and performed by Johnny Mathis. Producer Jerry Wald first showed interest in Mathis for the title song in August 1958.

The music, as recorded for the motion picture, was released on CD by Film Score Monthly in 2002.

== Reception ==
In The New York Times, critic Howard Thompson described the film as a "handsome but curiously unstimulating drama" and noted "the casting is dandy" with kudos to Lange. Commenting on Joan Crawford, the critic described her performance as "suave trouping." Thompson pointed out that "...for all its knowing air and chic appointments, the picture talkily lumbers onto the plane of soap opera, under Mr. Negulesco's reverential guidance."

Paul Beckley's review in the New York Herald Tribune stated: "...Miss Crawford comes near making the rest of the picture look like a distraction."

Crawford's peripheral role in the film generated much criticism. The men she was involved with romantically never appeared on the screen, and many of her scenes were cut.

A short-lived daytime soap opera of the same name was aired on ABC in 1970.

== Oscar nominations ==
The Best of Everything received two Oscar nominations during the 32nd Academy Awards: Best Original Song for the title song and Best Costumes-Color (Adele Palmer).

== See also ==
- List of American films of 1959
