= Open Hearing (Australian TV program) =

- Genre: Panel discussion
- Presented by: Malcolm Mackay
- Country of origin: Australia
- Original language: English

Original release
- Network: ABC Television
- Release: 29 August 1960 – 1961

Open Hearing is an Australian television program which aired 1960 to 1961 on ABC Television. Hosted by Malcolm Mackay, it was a panel discussion program in which topical subject matters would be discussed. The first episode aired 29 August 1960.

In one episode, the topic was What is the Future of New Guinea, while in another episode the topic was How can we develop the north of Australia.
