= Three Coins in the Fountain (song) =

Song composed by Jule Styne

Single by Frank Sinatra
- B-side: "Rain (Falling From The Skies)"
- Released: 1954
- Genre: Traditional pop
- Length: 3:01
- Label: Capitol
- Composer: Jule Styne
- Lyricist: Sammy Cahn

"Three Coins in the Fountain" is a popular song which received the Academy Award for Best Original Song in 1955. The song was first recorded by Frank Sinatra in 1954.

== Background ==
The melody was written by Jule Styne with lyrics by Sammy Cahn. It was written for the romance film, Three Coins in the Fountain and refers to the act of throwing a coin into the Trevi Fountain in Rome while making a wish. Each of the film's three stars (Clifton Webb, Dorothy McGuire, and Jean Peters) performs this act.

Cahn and Styne were asked to write the song to fit the movie, but were unable to either see the film or read the script. They completed the song in an hour and had produced a demonstration record with Frank Sinatra by the following day. The song was subsequently used in the film soundtrack, but in the rush, 20th Century-Fox neglected to sign a contract with the composers, allowing them to claim complete rights over the royalties. The Sinatra recording topped the UK Singles Chart for three weeks in September and October that year.

A parody song using the same melody was produced as the main theme for the 1967 Hong Kong romantic comedy film Teddy Boy in the Gutter, with lyrics contributed by Leung Shan-ren humorously referencing the film's title (protagonist Ah Fei literally falls into a gutter). The theme, consequently including the melody, is well-remembered in Hong Kong for its absurdist humor alongside the film.

== Other recordings ==
- The song was subsequently recorded by The Four Aces featuring Al Alberts, backed by the Jack Pleis Orchestra, in 1954.
- A recording by Dinah Shore with orchestra conducted by Harry Geller was made at Radio Recorders in Hollywood, California, on March 24, 1954. It was released by RCA Victor Records as catalog number 20-5755 (in US) and by EMI on the His Master's Voice label as catalog number B 10730. Harry James recorded a version on his 1955 album Jukebox Jamboree (Columbia CL-615). Vince Guaraldi included an instrumental version on his debut album, Vince Guaraldi Trio, in 1956.
- On October 8, 1966, Steve Smith sang "Three Coins in the Fountain" in a musical tour of Italy on ABC's The Lawrence Welk Show.
- Sergio Franchi sang the title song in another 20th Century Fox film made as the pilot for an unsold television series. This version was broadcast in 1970.
- It was recorded by Jack Jones in 1990, and used in the film Coins in the Fountain that year.

== Popular culture ==
- It was parodied in The Goon Show to the same tune, with the words "Three Goons in a fountain, which one will the fountain drown?"
- Steve Martin starts to sing "Three Coins in a Fountain" when attempting a sing-along in the 1987 film, Planes, Trains and Automobiles, but nobody else wants to sing the song.
- In the 1956 Merrie Melodies cartoon "Napoleon Bunny-Part” Bugs Bunny impersonating Empress Josephine inserts coins in a jukebox, selecting the fictitious disc "Three Coins in the Fountainbleu'" to play.

External audio
- You may hear '"Three Coins in the Fountain" performed by Annunzio Mantovani and his orchestra in 1957; Here on Archive.org

== See also ==
- List of UK Singles Chart number ones of the 1950s
