= Jean Negulesco =

Film director and screenwriter (1900–1993)

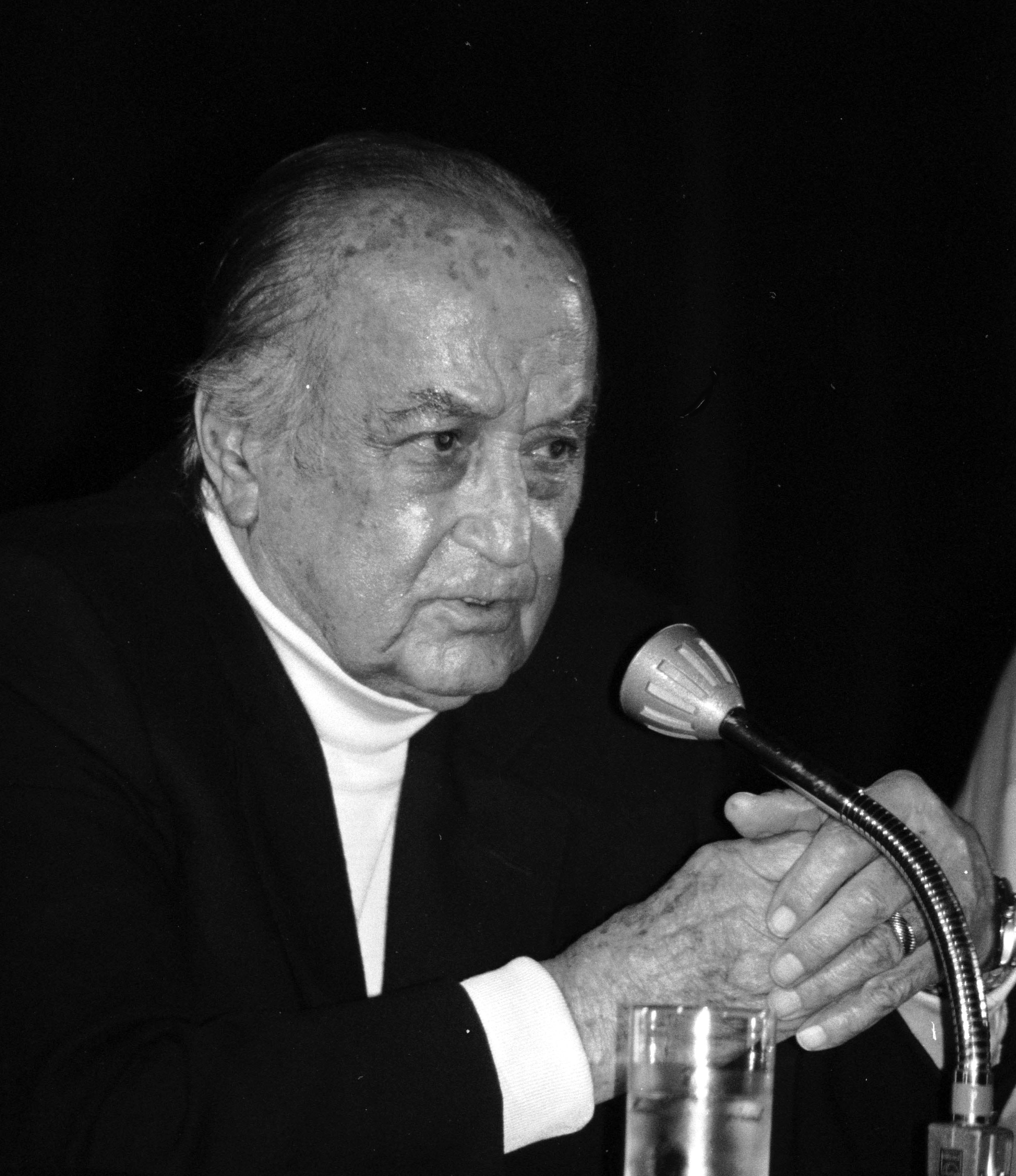
- Jean Negulesco in 1986
- Born: Ioan Negulescu; 13 March [O.S. 29 February] 1900; Craiova, Dolj, Kingdom of Romania
- Died: 18 July 1993 (aged 93); Marbella, Andalusia, Spain
- Occupations: Artist, film director, screenwriter, film producer
- Years active: 1918–1970
- Spouses: Winifred Havlicek (m. 1926; div. 1938) Dusty Anderson (m. 1946)
- Children: 2

Jean Negulesco (born Ioan Negulescu; 13 March [O.S. 29 February] 1900 – 18 July 1993) was a Romanian-American film director and screenwriter. He first gained notice for his films noir and later made such notable films as Johnny Belinda (1948), How to Marry a Millionaire (1953), Titanic (1953), and Three Coins in the Fountain (1954).

He was called "the first real master of CinemaScope".

== Biography ==
=== Early life ===
Born in Craiova, Negulesco was the son of a hotel keeper and attended Carol I High School. When he was 15, he was working in a military hospital during World War I. George Enescu, the Romanian composer, came to play the violin to the war wounded; Negulesco drew a portrait of him, and Enesco bought it. Negulesco decided to be a painter and studied art in Bucharest. Negulesco went to Paris in 1920, and enrolled in the Académie Julian. He sold one of his paintings to Rex Ingram.

=== America ===
In 1927, he visited New York City for an exhibition of his paintings and settled there. He then made his way to California, at first working as a portraitist. He became interested in movies and made an experimental feature film, financed as well as written and directed by himself, called Three and a Day. Through his contact with the film's star, Mischa Auer, he managed to get a job at Paramount.

=== Paramount ===
He did the opening montage for the film musical Tonight We Sing and worked on The Story of Temple Drake and A Farewell to Arms (1932).

=== Freelance ===
Jean Negulesco received screen credit as director for the first time in 1936, when he co-directed (with William Nigh) a Jack Holt action picture, Crash Donovan. He then began freelancing among various studios as second-unit director or as the author or co-author of stories and screenplays (Fight for Your Lady, Swiss Miss, Rio).

=== Warner Bros. ===
Negulesco went to Warner Bros. in 1940. He made his reputation there by directing short subjects, particularly a series of band shorts featuring unusual camera angles, striking compositions, and dramatic use of shadows and silhouettes. The studio recognized Negulesco's distinctive touch and referred to his shorts as "tone poems." His first feature film for Warner, without screen credit, was City for Conquest (1940); Negulesco finished the project when director Anatole Litvak was sidelined by an eye infection. Negulesco's first credited directorial assignment was Singapore Woman (1941). He remained with the studio through the 1940s. In 1948, he was nominated for an Academy Award for directing Johnny Belinda.

=== 20th Century-Fox ===
In 1948, Negulesco went to work for 20th Century-Fox. He was the first director to make two films in Fox's widescreen CinemaScope process: How to Marry a Millionaire and Three Coins in the Fountain; the former receiving a nomination for a BAFTA Award for Best Film.

His 1959 movie The Best of Everything was on Entertainment Weekly's Top 50 Cult Films of All-Time.

During his Hollywood career and in his 1984 autobiography Things I Did and Things I Think I Did, Negulesco claimed to have been born on 29 February 1900; he apparently was motivated to make this statement because birthdays on leap year day are comparatively rare (and even though 1900 was not a leap year in the Gregorian calendar, it was in the Julian calendar, which applied in Romania at that time).

He has a star on the Hollywood Walk of Fame at 6212 Hollywood Blvd.

== Death ==
From the late 1960s Jean Negulesco lived in Marbella, Spain, where he died, at age 93, of heart failure. He was survived by his wife of 47 years, former model and screen actress Dusty Anderson. He is buried in the Virgen del Carmen cemetery in Marbella.

== Filmography ==
=== Shorts ===
All for Warner Bros. except for the last entry:

- Alice in Movieland (1940)
- The Flag of Humanity (1940)
- Joe Reichman and His Orchestra (1940)
- Henry Busse and His Orchestra (1940)
- Skinnay Ennis and His Orchestra (1941)
- The Dog in the Orchard (1941)
- Jan Garber and His Orchestra (1941)
- Cliff Edwards and His Buckaroos (1941)
- Freddie Martin and His Orchestra (1941)
- Marie Green and Her Merry Men (1941)
- Hal Kemp and His Orchestra (1941)
- Glen Gray and the Casa Loma Orchestra (1941)
- Those Good Old Days (1941)
- University of Southern California Band and Glee Club (1941)
- Carioca Serenaders (1941)
- At the Stroke of Twelve (1941)
- The Gay Parisian (1941)
- Carl Hoff and His Orchestra (1942)
- Calling All Girls (1942)
- The Playgirls (1942)
- Spanish Fiesta (1942)
- The Daughter of Rosie O'Grady (1942)
- The Spirit of Annapolis (1942)
- Six Hits and a Miss (1942)
- United States Marine Band (1942)
- Borrah Minevitch and His Harmonica School (1942)
- The United States Army Air Force Band (1942)
- A Ship Is Born (1942)
- Army Show (1942)
- Ozzie Nelson and His Orchestra (1943)
- Three Cheers for the Girls (1943)
- The All American Bands (1943)
- All Star Melody Masters (1943)
- Childhood Days (1943)
- Hit Parade of the Gay Nineties (1943)
- Women at War (1943)
- Cavalcade of Dance (1943)
- Sweetheart Serenade (1943)
- Food and Magic (1943)
- Over the Wall (1943)
- The Voice That Thrilled the World (1943)
- The United States Service Bands (1943)
- The United States Army Band (1944)
- Roaring Guns (1944)
- Grandfather's Follies (1944)
- South American Sway (1944)
- Listen to the Bands (1944)
- The Dark Wave (Fox, 1956)

=== Feature films ===
- Crash Donovan (1936)
- City for Conquest (1940) (uncredited)
- Singapore Woman (1941)
- The Mask of Dimitrios (1944)
- The Conspirators (1944)
- Three Strangers (1946)
- Nobody Lives Forever (1946)
- Humoresque (1946)
- Deep Valley (1947)
- Johnny Belinda (1948)
- Road House (1948)
- The Forbidden Street (1949)
- Three Came Home (1950)
- Under My Skin (1950)
- Take Care of My Little Girl (1951)
- The Mudlark (1951)
- Lydia Bailey (1952)
- Lure of the Wilderness (1952)
- O. Henry's Full House (1952) (segment)
- Phone Call from a Stranger (1952)
- Titanic (1953)
- Scandal at Scourie (1953)
- How to Marry a Millionaire (1953)
- Three Coins in the Fountain (1954)
- River of No Return (1954) (uncredited)
- Woman's World (1954)
- The Rains of Ranchipur (1955)
- Daddy Long Legs (1955)
- Boy on a Dolphin (1957)
- A Certain Smile (1958)
- The Gift of Love (1958)
- Count Your Blessings (1959)
- The Best of Everything (1959)
- Jessica (1962)
- The Pleasure Seekers (1964)
- The Invincible Six (1970)
- Hello-Goodbye (1970)

== Archive ==
Many of Negulesco's home movies are held by the Academy Film Archive; the archive has preserved a number of them, including behind-the-scenes footage of Negulesco's films.
