= Deaths in December 2005 =

The following is a list of notable deaths in December 2005.

Entries for each day are listed alphabetically by surname. A typical entry lists information in the following sequence:

- Name, age, country of citizenship at birth, subsequent country of citizenship (if applicable), reason for notability, cause of death (if known), and reference.

== December 2005 ==
=== 1 ===
- Gust Avrakotos, 67, American CIA agent who armed the mujaheddin of Afghanistan, stroke.
- Mary Hayley Bell, 94, British actress, Alzheimer's disease.
- Béla Berger, 74, Hungarian-Australian chess master.
- Hermann Buchner, 86, German World War II flying ace.
- Jack Colvin, 71, American actor, (The Incredible Hulk), coronary thrombosis.
- Michael Evans, 61, American White House photographer, cancer.
- Ray Hanna, 77, New Zealand-English pilot and founder of The Old Flying Machine Company.
- Karin Himboldt, 85, German film actress.
- Michael Kehlmann, 78, Austrian theatre and television film director, screenwriter and actor.
- Victor Premasagar, 78, Indian theologian and Bishop of Medak (1983–1992).
- Red Pryor, 79, American basketball player.
- Eddie Schroeder, 94, American speed skater and Olympian (1932, 1936).

=== 2 ===
- Nikolai Artemov, 97, Soviet and Russian physiologist.
- Anant Bhargava, 81-82, Indian Olympic wrestler (1948).
- Lillian Browse, 99, British art dealer.
- Shawn Paul Humphries, 34, American convicted murderer, executed by lethal injection.
- Malik Joyeux, 25, French professional surfer, drowned.
- William P. Lawrence, 75, American U.S. Navy Vice Admiral, first to fly at twice the speed of sound.
- Leonard Lewis, 78, British television director and producer.
- Peter Menegazzo, 61, Australian cattle baron, plane crash.
- Tom Miller, 87, American gridiron football player (Philadelphia Eagles, Washington Redskins, Green Bay Packers).
- Jaime Morón, 55, Colombian football player and Olympian (1972).
- Van Tuong Nguyen, 25, Australian convicted of drug trafficking, execution by hanging.
- Mohammed Hamza Zubeidi, 67, Iraqi politician, former prime minister under Saddam Hussein.

=== 3 ===
- Frederick Ashworth, 93, American naval officer, weaponeer who dropped atomic bomb on Nagasaki.
- John Ganzoni, 2nd Baron Belstead, 73, British aristocrat and politician.
- Peter Cook, 62, Australian politician, melanoma.
- Lance Dossor, 89, Australian pianist.
- Peter E. Haas, 86, American billionaire businessman, president, CEO and chairman of Levi Strauss & Co.
- Kikka, 41, Finnish pop and schlager singer, heart attack.
- Kåre Kristiansen, 85, Norwegian politician, minister of Oil and Energy (1983–1986).
- Lupe Madera, 52, Mexican boxer.
- Eldon Brooks Mahon, 87, American district judge (United States District Court for the Northern District of Texas).
- Herb Moford, 77, American baseball player.
- Atsuko Tanaka, 73, Japanese avant-garde artist.
- Roy Valdés, 85, Cuban baseball player (Washington Senators).

=== 4 ===
- Ted Allbeury, 88, British author of espionage fiction.
- Débora Arango, 98, Colombian artist.
- Percy Brandt, 83, Swedish actor.
- Errol Brathwaite, 81, New Zealand writer.
- Alfred Farag, 76, Egyptian playwright.
- Gregg Hoffman, 42, American film producer (Saw).
- Gloria Lasso, 83, Spanish singer, heart attack.
- Jacob Pins, 88, German-Israeli woodcut artist and art collector.

=== 5 ===
- John Alvheim, 75, Norwegian politician.
- Gerald Smedley Andrews, 101, Canadian frontier teacher, land surveyor, and soldier.
- Wesley Baker, 47, American convicted murderer, executed in Maryland.
- Gerard Bruggink, 88, Dutch fighter pilot during World War II and recipient of the Military Order of William.
- Liu Binyan, 80, Chinese author and dissident, cancer.
- Ursula Buckel, 79, German soprano.
- Netai Bysack, 84, Indian Olympic cyclist (1952).
- Milo Dor, 82, Serbian-Austrian author, heart failure.
- Edward L. Masry, 73, American attorney and mentor to Erin Brockovich, complications of diabetes.
- Kevin "Big Kev" McQuay, 56, Australian businessman and media personality, heart attack.
- Ed Murphy, 75, American soccer player and Olympian (1956).
- Harry Pepl, 60, Austrian jazz guitarist and composer.
- Frits Philips, 100, Dutch businessman, grandson of the founder of Philips, complications from a fall.
- Billy Reed, 83, American basketball and baseball player (Boston Braves).
- Bob Richardson, 77, American fashion photographer.
- Bill Robinson, 71, British rugby league player.
- Claude Ambrose Rogers, 85, English mathematician.
- Vladimir Toporov, 77, Russian philologist.

=== 6 ===
- Charly Gaul, 72, Luxembourgish cyclist, winner of the 1958 Tour de France, pneumonia.
- Richard Grimsdale, 76, British electrical engineer, built the world's first transistorised computer.
- Paul Halla, 74, Austrian footballer.
- Peter Hollfelder, 75, German classical pianist.
- Hanns Dieter Hüsch, 80, German political satirist.
- Koba Kurtanidze, 41, Soviet Georgian judoka.
- Stephen L. Mosko, 57, American composer.
- Devan Nair, 82, President of Singapore (1981–1985), dementia.
- Emery Nix, 86, American football player (TCU Horned Frogs, New York Giants).
- Jerzy Pajaczkowski-Dydynski, 111, Polish-born oldest man in the UK at the time of his death.
- Danny Williams, 63, South African singer, lung cancer.
- William P. Yarborough, 93, American Army officer.

=== 7 ===
- Martine Bercher, 61, American football player.
- Adrian Biddle, 53, British cinematographer (Aliens, The Princess Bride, Thelma & Louise), heart attack.
- Marvin Braude, 85, American member of Los Angeles City Council.
- Carroll A. Campbell, Jr., 65, American politician, South Carolina governor (1987–1995), and member of U.S. House of Representatives (1979–1987), heart attack.
- Bud Carson, 75, American football player, former NFL head coach, emphysema.
- Bill Cupolo, 81, Canadian ice hockey player (Boston Bruins).
- Loomis Dean, 88, American photographer, notably for Life magazine.
- Beach Dickerson, 81, American actor.
- Thukha, 95, Burmese film director, actor, and film producer.
- Eddy Verstraeten, 57, Belgian road bicycle racer.

=== 8 ===
- John Beale, 72, British virologist.
- R. W. Bradford, 58, American writer, publisher of Liberty magazine, kidney cancer.
- Rose Heilbron, 91, British judge, pneumonia.
- Donald Martino, 74, American composer.
- George D. Painter, 91, British biographer.
- David S. Saxon, 85, American physicist and educator.
- Leo Scheffczyk, 85, German Roman Catholic cardinal and theologian.
- Roger Shattuck, 82, American writer and critic, prostate cancer.
- Jim Simons, 55, American golfer, accidental multiple drug toxicity.
- J. N. Williamson, 73, American horror writer, author and publisher.
- Georgiy Zhzhonov, 90, Russian actor and writer, lung cancer.

=== 9 ===
- Norman Blundell, 88, Australian cricketer.
- Mike Botts, 61, American drummer, toured and recorded with Linda Ronstadt, Dan Fogelberg, and Tina Turner, cancer.
- Ron Filipek, 61, American basketball player (Tennessee Tech Golden Eagles, Philadelphia 76ers).
- Rudolf Meidner, 91, Swedish economist and socialist.
- Homer Mensch, 91, American internationally known bass player, Juilliard teacher.
- Eunice Norton, 97, American classical pianist and music promoter.
- Robert Sheckley, 77, American science fiction author, brain aneurysm.
- György Sándor, 93, Hungarian pianist, Juilliard teacher, heart failure.
- Boris Taslitzky, 94, French painter.

=== 10 ===
- Juan Ecker, 75, Argentine rower and Olympian (1952).
- Evgenii Feinberg, 93, Soviet physicist.
- Mary Jackson, 95, American schoolteacher and actress (The Waltons, Parenthood), Parkinson's disease.
- Eugene McCarthy, 89, American politician, U.S. Senator from Minnesota (1959–1971), U.S. Representative (1949–1959), Parkinson's disease.
- Jim McIntyre, 78, American basketball player (Minnesota Golden Gophers).
- Richard Pryor, 65, American comedian and actor (Stir Crazy, Harlem Nights), heart attack and complications of multiple sclerosis.
- Clark G. Reynolds, 65, American naval historian, heart attack.

=== 11 ===
- Walt Cudzik, 73, American NFL football player (Washington Redskins, Boston Patriots, Buffalo Bills).
- Robert Frojen, 75, American water polo player and Olympian (1956).
- Maria Kaniewska, 94, Polish actress, screenplay writer, film director.
- Norman Leavitt, 92, American film and television actor.
- Richard Sandbrook, 59, British environmentalist, cancer.
- Hayim Tadmor, 82, Israeli assyriologist and professor.
- Max Walters, 85, British botanist and academic.

=== 12 ===
- Amerigo Cacioni, 97, Italian cyclist.
- Sandipan Chattopadhyay, 72, Indian Bengali writer.
- Eric D'Arcy, 81, Australian Roman Catholic archbishop.
- John Griffin, 75, Canadian Olympic alpine skier (1952).
- Max Mariu, 53, First Maori Catholic bishop.
- Robert Newmyer, 49, American film producer (The Santa Clause, Training Day, Sex, Lies, and Videotape), heart attack.
- David Pritchard, 86, British chess player and chess writer.
- Ramanand Sagar, 87, Indian director, producer, and writer.
- Juraj Szikora, 58, Slovak football player.
- Gebran Tueni, 48, Lebanese journalist and politician, assassinated by a car bomb.
- Gyula Trebitsch, 91, Hungarian-German film producer.
- Annette Vadim, 69, Danish actress, cancer.

=== 13 ===
- John Barraclough, 79, Australian politician.
- César Bonoris, 78, Argentine gymnast and Olympian (1948, 1952).
- Thérèse De Grijze, 79, Belgian Olympic gymnast (1948).
- Roland Guy, 77, British army general.
- John Langstaff, 84, American singer and music educator.
- Majid Musisi, 38, Ugandan football player, AIDS-related complications.
- Dick Nolan, 66, Canadian musician.
- Stanley "Tookie" Williams, 51, American convicted murderer and co-founder of the Crips turned anti-gang activist, execution by lethal injection.
- Roberto Wagner Fernandes, 40, Brazilian serial killer and rapist, plane crash.

=== 14 ===
- Erhard Ahmann, 64, German football manager.
- Ruth Amiran, 91, Israeli archaeologist.
- Stew Bowers, 90, American baseball player (Boston Red Sox).
- Gordon Duncan, 41, Scottish musician and bagpiper, suicide.
- Tull Gasmann, 78, Norwegian Olympic alpine skier (1952).
- Rokuro Ishikawa, 80, Japanese businessman (Kajima Corporation).
- Sudhir Joshi, 57, Indian actor, heart attack.
- Fritz Kristoffersen, 88, Norwegian footballer.
- Tom Milne, 79, British film critic.
- John B. Nixon, 77, American convicted murderer, executed in Mississippi.
- C. I. Paul, 61, Indian (Malayalam) actor, heart attack.
- Trevanian, 74, British author, wrote under pseudonyms such as "Trevanian".
- Rakel Wahl, 84, Norwegian Olympic cross-country skier (1952, 1956).

=== 15 ===
- T. K. Balachandran, 77, Indian actor, cancer.
- Maurice Beresford, 85, British economic historian and archaeologist.
- James Ingo Freed, 75, American architect, Parkinson's disease.
- Giuseppe Patroni Griffi, 84, Italian writer and director of movies and theatre.
- Heinrich Gross, 90, Austrian alleged nazi doctor and war criminal during World War II.
- Jiřina Hauková, 86, Czech poet and translator.
- Walter Haut, 83, American Army lieutenant, central figure in the Roswell UFO incident in 1947.
- Stan Leonard, 90, Canadian golfer, heart failure.
- Julián Marías, 91, Spanish philosopher and father of author Javier Marías.
- John McIntyre, 89, Scottish theologian.
- Akira Ohgi, 70, Japanese baseball player and manager, lung cancer.
- Jim Ostendarp, 82, American football coach at Amherst College for 33 years.
- Enrico Paoli, 97, Italian international chess master.
- William Proxmire, 90, American politician, Democratic Senator from Wisconsin (1957–1989), complications of Alzheimer's disease.
- Darrell Russell, 29, American football player (Oakland Raiders, Washington Redskins), car accident.

=== 16 ===
- Robert L. Baird, 85, American jockey and trainer in thoroughbred horse racing.
- Anthony Barber, 85, British politician and Chancellor of the Exchequer, complications of Parkinson's disease.
- Boyi Bhimanna, 94, Indian Telugu poet, Parkinson's disease.
- Kenneth Bulmer, 84, English writer (pseudonyms included Alan Burt Akers and Dray Prescot).
- Aleksandr Mazur, 92, Heavyweight Greco-Roman wrestler from Ukraine.
- Joseph Owades, 86, American biochemist, inventor of light beer.
- Helmut H. Schaefer, 80, German mathematician.
- David Schiaffino, 92, Argentine Olympic sports shooter (1948, 1952).
- John Spencer, 58, American actor (The West Wing, L.A. Law, The Rock), Emmy winner (2002), heart attack.
- Enzo Stuarti, 86, Italian tenor, was in many Broadway musicals, heart failure.

=== 17 ===
- Jack Anderson, 83, American Pulitzer Prize-winning columnist, complications of Parkinson's disease.
- Trevor Duncan, 81, English composer.
- Mustafa Ertan, 79, Turkish footballer and Olympian (1952, 1960).
- Marc Favreau, 76, French Canadian television and film actor, cancer.
- Jacques Fouroux, 58, French rugby union captain and coach, heart attack.
- Agnès Guillemot, 74, French film editor.
- Yeleazar Meletinsky, 87, Russian scholar and academic.
- Margriet Prajoux-Bouma, 93, Dutch Olympic alpine skier (1952).
- Emil Ratzenhofer, 91, Austrian Olympic pair skater (1948).
- Sverre Stenersen, 79, Norwegian skier and Olympian (1952, 1956, 1960).
- Ward Williams, 82, American basketball player (Fort Wayne Pistons).
- Greg Wojcik, 59, American football player (Los Angeles Rams, San Diego Chargers).
- Tahsin Özgüç, 89, Turkish archaeologist.

=== 18 ===
- Belita, 82, British Olympic skater (1936), and film actress.
- Bill Coulthard, 81, Canadian basketball player and Olympian (1952).
- Keith Duckworth, 72, British automotive designer.
- Doug Dye, 84, New Zealand microbiologist.
- Howie Ferguson, 75, American gridiron football player (Green Bay Packers, Los Angeles Chargers).
- Rómulo García, 78, Argentine Roman Catholic archbishop.
- Barry Halper, 66, American baseball memorabilia collector and limited partner for the New York Yankees.
- N. Sankaran Nair, 80, Indian director of Malayalam movies.
- Dmitry Okhotsimsky, 84, Russian engineer in the Soviet space program.
- Doris Fisher, Baroness Fisher of Rednal, 86, British politician and peer.
- P. M. Sayeed, 64, Indian Minister of Power, heart attack.
- Tiago João da Silva, 17, Brazilian robber.
- Alan Voorhees, 83, American transportation engineer and city planner, stroke.
- Dick Walls, 74, American college basketball player (Miami RedHawks).

=== 19 ===
- Charles Brett, 77, Northern Irish architectural historian.
- George Bromilow, 74, British footballer and Olympian (1956).
- Yū Fujiki, 74, Japanese film and television actor.
- Vincent Gigante, 77, American Genovese family crime boss, heart disease.
- Marjorie Kellogg, 83, American author and playwright (Tell Me That You Love Me, Junie Moon), Alzheimer's disease.
- William Leslie, 80, American film and television actor.
- Joseph Shaw, 67, American boxer and Olympian (1956).
- Azra Sherwani, 65, Pakistani actress.

=== 20 ===
- Alfredo Arango, 60, Colombian international football player and Olympian (1968).
- Louis Biesbrouck, 84, Dutch football player and Olympian (1948, 1952).
- Raoul Bott, 82, Hungarian-American mathematician, cancer.
- Argentina Brunetti, 98, Argentine actress. (It's a Wonderful Life, The Caddy), writer, journalist.
- Theodore Holmes Bullock, 90, American neuroscientist.
- Bradford Cannon, 98, American plastic surgeon, pneumonia.
- Genrikh Fedosov, 73, Soviet football player.
- Robert Forget, 50, Canadian Olympic high jumper (1976).
- Lavinia Gianoni, 94, Italian Olympic gymnast (1928).
- José Roberto Hill, 60, Mexican actor.
- William White Howells, 97, American anthropologist.
- Billy Hughes, 57, American former child/film actor during the 1960s.
- Óscar López, 66, Colombian international football player, diabetes.
- Yuri Nyrkov, 81, Soviet Russian footballer and Olympian (1952).
- Frank Shannon, 88, American basketball player.
- Graham Wilson, 66, Australian rugby league player.

=== 21 ===
- Horace Ellis Crouch, 87, American military aviator, member of the Doolittle Raid.
- Myron Healey, 82, American film actor.
- Elrod Hendricks, 64, U.S. Virgin Islander Baltimore Orioles coach, former MLB catcher, heart attack.
- Pericle Martinescu, 94, Romanian writer, journalist and translator.
- Guntis Niedra, 62, Soviet Latvian rower and Olympian (1968).
- Rudolf Pernický, 90, Czechoslovak soldier and paratrooper.
- Traian Stoianovich, 84, American historian and academic.
- Hallam Tennyson, 85, British radio producer and great-grandson of Alfred, Lord Tennyson, suspected victim of murder.
- Vicente de Cadenas y Vicent, 90, Spanish officer of arms.

=== 22 ===
- Richard Bellucci, 91, American ear surgeon and inventor.
- Lou Daukas, 84, American football player (Cornell Big Red, Brooklyn Dodgers).
- T. Cooper Evans, 81, American politician, Republican US Representative from Iowa (1981–1987).
- Georgios Marmaridis, 75, Greek Olympic sports shooter (1960).
- Aurora Miranda, 90, Brazilian entertainer and sister of Carmen Miranda, heart attack.
- Bill Scott, 82, Australian author.
- George Speaight, 91, British art historian, actor and puppeteer.

=== 23 ===
- Lajos Baróti, 91, Hungarian football coach.
- Selma Jeanne Cohen, 85, American dance historian, editor of The International Encyclopedia of Dance, Alzheimer's disease.
- Ivar Eskeland, 78, Norwegian philologist, publisher, and radio personality.
- Gwynne Blakemore Evans, 93, American Shakespeare scholar, author of The Riverside Shakespeare, stroke.
- Truman Gibson, 93, American anti-segregation lawyer and boxing promoter.
- Harold Hallman, 43, Canadian football player, complications during surgery.
- Emmett Leith, 78, American electrical engineer.
- Kay Stammers, 91, British tennis player.
- Jeanine Touchard, 81, French Olympic gymnast (1948).
- Norman D. Vaughan, 100, American explorer and sportsman, part of Richard Byrd's 1928 South Pole expedition.
- Yao Wenyuan, 74, Chinese Communist political leader, member of the Gang of Four, diabetes.

=== 24 ===
- George Gerbner, 86, American professor of communication, cancer.
- Cor Huijbregts, 85, Dutch footballer.
- Bobby Jancik, 65, American football player (Houston Oilers).
- Georg Johannesen, 74, Norwegian author and professor of rhetoric, drowned.
- Constance Keene, 84, American classical pianist.
- Harold Lawton, 105, British academic and veteran of World War I.
- Herman Purcell, 82, American baseball player.
- Bhanumathi Ramakrishna, 80, Indian film actress, director, and singer/songwriter.
- Xavier Rescigno, 93, American baseball player (Pittsburgh Pirates).
- Michael Vale, 83, American actor who appeared in over Dunkin' Donuts 1,300 commercials, diabetes.
- Wang Daohan, 90, Chinese politician and negotiator during the cross-straits talks.

=== 25 ===
- Felice Andreasi, 77, Italian actor, Parkinson's disease.
- Derek Bailey, 75, English avant-garde guitarist, motor neuron disease.
- Robert Barbers, 61, Filipino politician and senator, heart attack.
- Donald Dawson, 97, American lawyer, executive assistant to Harry S. Truman.
- John Hayes, 76, British art historian and museum curator.
- Henry Kock, 53, Canadian horticulturist and eco-activist, brain cancer.
- Birgit Nilsson, 87, Swedish soprano.
- Joseph Pararajasingham, 71, Sri Lankan politician and supporter of the Tamil Tiger rebels, shot.
- Alfred Rössner, 94, Austrian Olympic cross-country skier (1936).
- Clint Sampson, 44, American football player (Denver Broncos), car accident.
- Sarat Chandra Sinha, 92, Indian politician, Chief Minister of Assam.
- Charles Socarides, 83, American psychiatrist, physician, and author, heart failure.
- Roy Stuart, 70, American actor, cancer.

=== 26 ===
- Mikuláš Athanasov, 75, Czechoslovak wrestler and Olympic medalist (1952).
- Bud Blake, 87, American cartoonist (Tiger).
- John Cooke, 68, American competition rower and Olympic champion (1956).
- Muriel Costa-Greenspon, 68, American mezzo-soprano at the New York City Opera for 30 years.
- Bill DeArango, 84, American jazz guitarist.
- Guy Delorme, 76, French actor (The Three Musketeers, Moonraker), lip and oral cavity carcinoma.
- John Diebold, 79, American businessman, pioneering American computer engineer.
- Ted Ditchburn, 84, English football goalkeeper (Tottenham Hotspur, England national football team).
- Jules Gérard-Libois, 82, Belgian historian and writer.
- Visco Grgich, 83, American football player (San Francisco 49ers).
- John H. Herz, 97, American scholar of international relations and law.
- Yury Ilyasov, 79, Soviet Russian Olympic high jumper (1952).
- Ernesto Leal, 60, Nicaraguan politician, presidential chief of staff and foreign minister, pneumonia.
- Geraldine McCormick, 81, American politician, member of the Washington House of Representatives (1969–1982).
- Kerry Packer, 68, Australian billionaire publishing-, media- and gaming tycoon, kidney failure.
- Viacheslav Platonov, 66, Russian volleyball player and coach.
- Vincent Schiavelli, 57, American actor (Ghost, Buffy the Vampire Slayer, One Flew Over the Cuckoo's Nest), lung cancer.
- Viktor Stepanov, 58, Russian actor, bone cancer.
- John Taylor, 80, Canadian football player (St. Hyacinthe-Donnacona Navy and Montreal Alouettes).
- Erich Topp, 91, German U-boat commander during World War II.

=== 27 ===
- Stuart Alexander, 44, American businessman and murderer, pulmonary embolism.
- Philip N. Carney, 86, American politician, member of the Massachusetts House of Representatives.
- Ray Clemons, 84, American football player (Saint Mary's Gaels, Green Bay Packers).
- Xavier Connor, 88, Australian jurist and foundation judge of the Federal Court of Australia.
- C. William Doody, 74, Canadian politician, member of the Senate of Canada (1979- ).
- John F. Druze, 91, American football player (Fordham Rams, Brooklyn Dodgers), and coach.
- Hartmut Enke, 53, German musician.
- Edith Heath, 94, American studio potter.
- Leif Hermansen, 80, Danish Olympic rower (1952).
- Dick Klein, 71, American gridiron football player.
- Abraham S. Luchins, 91, American Gestalt psychologist.
- Dee Pollock, 68, American film and television actor.
- Giancarlo Primo, 81, Italian basketball coach, the first to defeat USA and USSR in the 1970s.
- Tokuji Wakasa, 91, Japanese businessman, former president of All Nippon Airways.

=== 28 ===
- Bruce Carver, 57, American video game developer, cancer.
- Paul Cloyd, 85, American basketball player.
- Patrick Cranshaw, 86, American actor (Old School, Best in Show, Herbie: Fully Loaded), pneumonia.
- Tage Ekfeldt, 79, Swedish sprinter and Olympian (1952).
- Exequiel Figueroa, 81, Chilean Olympic basketball player (1948, 1952).
- Marco Guglielmi, 77, Italian actor, screenwriter and author.
- Stevo Žigon, 79, Serbian actor and theatre director, heart attack.

=== 29 ===
- Armand Phillip Bartos, 95, American architect.
- Gerda Boyesen, 83, Norwegian psychologist.
- Dan Carnevale, 87, American baseball player.
- Young-Oak Kim, 86, American military officer during World War II and the Korean War and civic leader, cancer.
- Ray Mattox, 78, American politician.
- Eileen Nolan, 85, British Director of the Women's Royal Army Corps.
- Elizabeth Parcells, 54, American operatic coloratura soprano, colorectal cancer.
- Cyril Philips, 93, British historian and academic administrator.
- Basil William Robinson, 93, British art scholar and author.
- Sir Eric Stroud, 81, British paediatrician.
- Abuna Yesehaq Mandefro, 72, Ethiopian Orthodox Archbishop.

=== 30 ===
- Eddie Barlow, 65, South African cricketer.
- Candy Barr, 70, American exotic dancer, pneumonia.
- Charles J. Bowles, 83, American physical education expert.
- Pasquale Carpino, 69, Italian-born Canadian television chef and operatic singer.
- Tory Dent, 47, American poet, essayist and art critic, AIDS-related complications.
- Rona Jaffe, 74, American novelist (The Best of Everything, Mazes and Monsters), cancer.
- Germán Mailhos, 72, Uruguayan Olympic equestrian (1960).
- Fred "Jock" Smith, 79, Scottish footballer (Hull City, Sheffield United and Millwall).
- Bobby Stevens, 98, American baseball player (Philadelphia Phillies).

=== 31 ===
- Sanora Babb, 98, American writer.
- Waldemar Bernatzky, 85, Uruguayan Olympic cyclist (1948).
- Harry Clarke, 89, American gridiron football player (Chicago Bears, Los Angeles Dons, Chicago Rockets).
- Maurice Dodd, 83, British cartoonist (The Perishers), brain haemorrhage.
- St. John Ellis, 41, English rugby league footballer and coach.
- Enrico Di Giuseppe, 73, American operatic tenor, cancer.
- Sverre Lassen-Urdahl, 92, Norwegian Olympic alpine skier (1948).
- Fee Malten, 94, German film actress.
- John Peel, 101, British gynaecologist.
- Erica Reiner, 81, American assyriologist and author.
- Carlos Roffé, 62, Argentine film and television actor.
- Maclovia Ruiz, 95, American dancer, pneumonia.
- Xolilizwe Sigcawu, 79, South African King of the Gcaleka.
- Aleksandr Silayev, 77, Russian sprint canoeist and Olympic silver medalist (1960).
- Claude Sylvain, 75, French actor and singer.
- David Trustram Eve, 2nd Baron Silsoe, 75, British lawyer.
- Aiko Suzuki, 68, Canadian textile and visual artist.
- Phillip Whitehead, 68, British politician and television presenter, MP for Derby North, heart attack.
