= Grand Rapids Colored Athletics =

Information
- League: Grand Rapids City League
- Location: Grand Rapids, Michigan
- Ballpark: Ramona Athletic Park; Island Park; Bigelow Field; Valley Field Park; Beverly Park
- Established: 1900
- Disbanded: 1958: Not active from 1930 to 1937
- Nicknames: Jess Elster's Colored Athletics; The Elsterites

The Grand Rapids Colored Athletics or Jess Elster's Colored Athletics was an African American semi-pro baseball team founded in Grand Rapids, Michigan. The aggregation played competitive league games in the city and barnstormed throughout the western part of Lower Michigan in the first half of the twentieth century. Several players on the team went on to play in the professional Negro Leagues. The team is also notable for the impact that its members had on the Grand Rapids African American community.

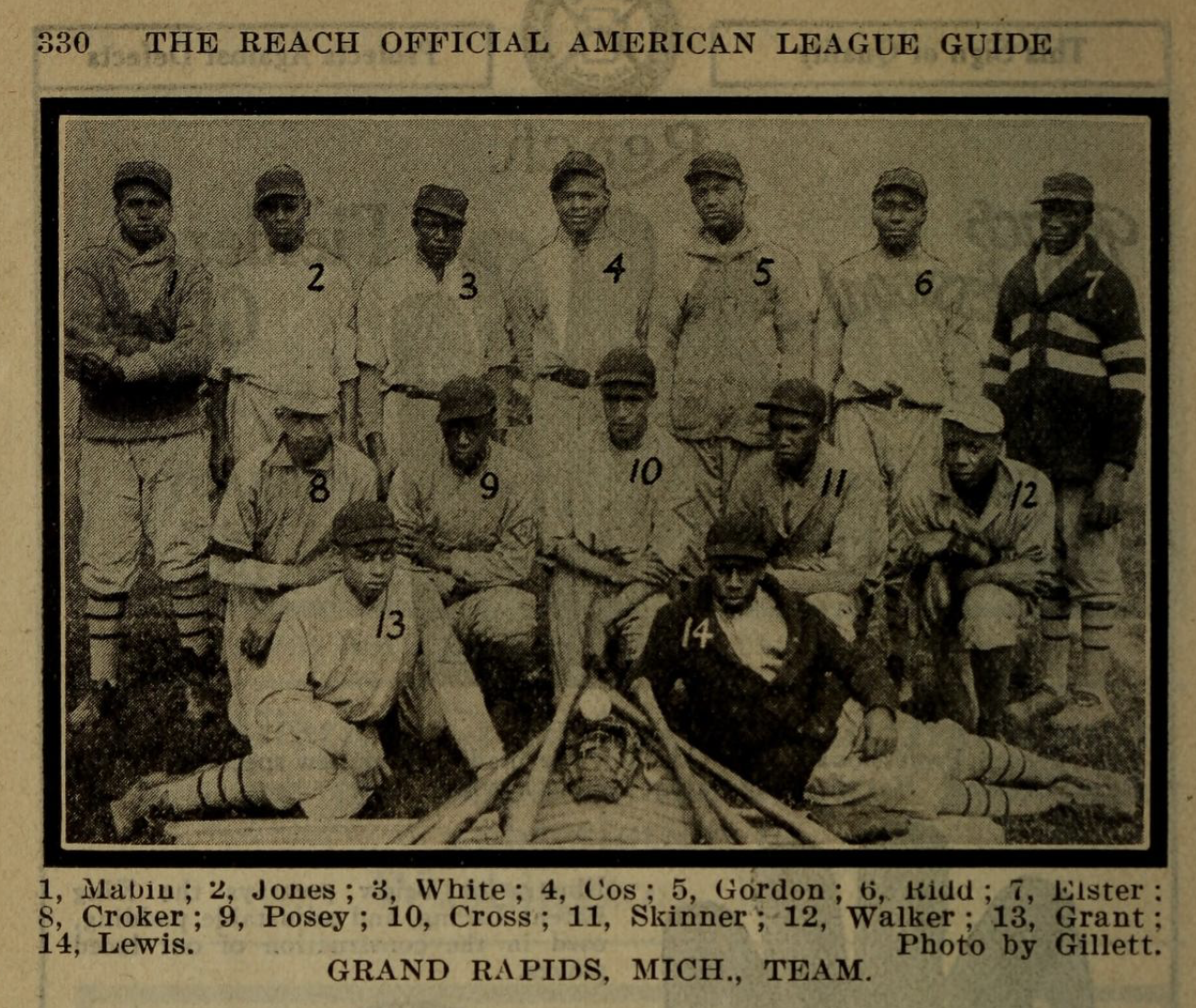
Picture of the Grand Rapids Colored Athletics from The Reach Official American League Baseball Guide, 1918

== History ==
The Grand Rapids Colored Athletics was established in 1900 by William Mabin. The formation of the Colored Athletics followed the success of another Michigan African American baseball team, the Paige Fence Giants. The Giants dissolved in 1898, but the success they had on the field created a blueprint for black teams that followed. The Grand Rapids team was originally called the Colored Invincibles. In 1905 the name was changed to the Colored Superior Athletics. The following year the squad was reorganized. Ira Lewis, from Hot Springs, Arkansas, was named manager and several new ball players were placed on the rooster. The reorganized ball team was known, in the Grand Rapids newspapers, simply as the Colored Athletics. In 1905, a young Kentuckian with little knowledge of baseball joined the Colored Invincibles. Although the twenty-two year old, Jesse Elster, was new to baseball, he became the Colored Athletics manager after only a few years of playing for the team. In 1922, Elster retired from playing full-time, but he would remain the team's manager till his death in 1950.

The team functioned as most semipro teams in Grand Rapids in the early 1900s. The team manager would request games and provide information about games to be played in the local newspaper. The team found early success, winning the Grand Rapids City League Pennant in 1908. Acknowledgment of the team's high caliber of performance did not occur till the 1917 season. During that year, the Athletics played their regular weekend game at Ramona Athletic Park. Behind the pitching of Clearance Mabin and the slugging of the catcher Walter Coe, they finished the season with 22 wins and 3 losses. From the late 1910s till the end of the 1920s, the Colored Athletics were a prominent fixture in the Grand Rapids baseball community. One of the most talked-about non-state championship games of the 1920s was the clash between the Colored Athletics and the Kelly Ice Creams. The Kellys had won the state championship that year, but the Athletics, who finished second in the championship were angered that, due to drawing a by week, the Kellys played one less game. For the game against the Colored Athletics, the Kellys used pitcher Walter "Lefty" Anderson. Anderson had played five years in the minor leagues and two years in Major League Baseball for the Philadelphia Athletics. The Kellys baseball club also featured Ted Olsee, Joe Grodick, Johnny Mate, and Louis Corsiglia. All four played professional minor league baseball in the Central League. The Colored Athletics fielded three players who had professional Negro League experience as well: Elbert Norman, Jack Matthews, and Nat Rogers. The Grand Rapids Herald lauded Rogers' hitting ability. The paper stated that, "but for the color line being drawn in organized baseball, he might be playing in the majors." Although the game was close, the Colored Athletics lost. Rogers led both teams with two hits, but the final score was 2-0. The success of the Colored Athletics in the 1920s led to the formation of the Fox Jewelry Colored Giants baseball team in 1928. Several of the Athletics' star players joined the Giants due to the team's higher pay. This, combined with the start of the Great Depression, led the Athletics to disband in 1930.

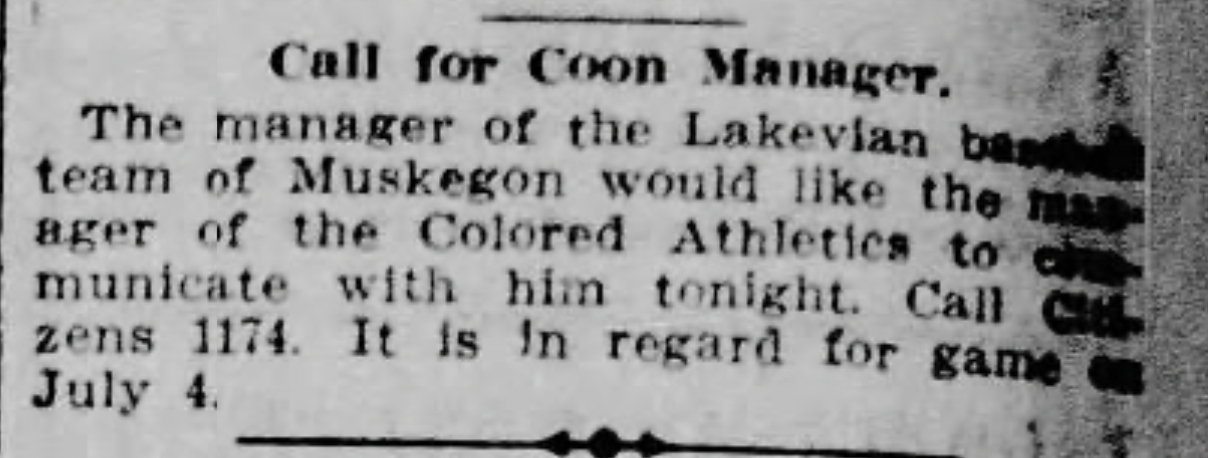
June 30, 1910 - The Grand Rapids Press - A request for the manager of the Colored Athletics to contact the manager of a Muskegon baseball team using a racist slur.

During, the early 1930s Grand Rapids had several African American semipro baseball teams. The Fineis Oil Giants, the Dixie Gas Giants, the Pere Marquette Giants, and the Chicky Bar Giants all played in the Grand Rapids area from 1931 to 1937. None of the teams, though, lasted for more than couple of years before disbanding. In 1938, with a lack an African American baseball teams in Grand Rapids, Elster reorganized the Colored Athletics. Throughout the 1940s, Elster and the Colored Athletics continued to play across western Michigan. Several communities celebrated "Jess Elster Day" when the Colored Athletics were in town, and in the mid-1940s the two Grand Rapids newspapers began to refer to Elster as "Grand Rapids' Mr. Baseball." The team's last winning season with Elster as their skipper came in 1946. During the that season, the Athletics had 38 wins and 21 losses. They were also runners up to the Michigan Semipro Championship. They were beaten that year by the St. Joseph Autos. The Autos team featured four former major league players: Roy Henshaw, Al Piechota, Ernie Rudolph, and Benny McCoy. Interest in the Athletics began to wane as newer baseball teams emerged in the second half of the 1940s. The Grand Rapids Chicks of the All-American Professional Girls Baseball League, the Grand Rapids Jets, a minor league affiliate of the Chicago Cubs, and the newly formed Grand Rapids Black Sox all drew spectators and fans away from the fifty year old club.

At the end of the 1950 season, Jess Elster, the long-time manager of the Colored Athletics died. The team, though, continued to play into the late 1950s. In 1955, the Colored Athletics played several games against the newly formed Sullivan Furniture Baseball Club. The Sullivans would go on to win four National Baseball Congress semipro championships over the next three decades. Future Baseball Hall of Fame pitcher and Grand Rapids native, Jim Kaat, played against the Athletics in Grand Rapids during the 1950s as a teenager. The Grand Rapids Press reported in late August 1956 that the Colored Athletics were to face the Sullivans at Valley Field. The team's record up to that point was 17 wins and 3 losses. After 1956, reports of the team's games are spars. The team played in 1957 and took the field in 1958 for the last time.

== Players ==
The Grand Rapids Colored Athletics was a fixture in Grand Rapids semipro baseball for almost a half century. The team was composed of men that used the Colored Athletics to prolong their baseball career, those that used it as a steppingstone to the Negro Leagues, and ballplayers that remained part of the Grand Rapids community after their baseball career ended. Several players came to Grand Rapids after playing for professional Negro League teams. The team also had several players that transitioned from Grand Rapids semipro baseball to professional Negro League teams. In total, players from seventeen different Negro League teams spent time playing for the Colored Athletics. Representatives from the 1925 and 1927 Negro League World Series would play under Jess Elster’s management. Players on the team also included African Americans that impacted the Grand Rapids community. The first African American to join the Grand Rapids Police Department came to the city to play for the Colored Athletics. Two players earned their law degrees while playing for the team. One of whom remained in Grand Rapids fighting for civil rights after his playing days were over. The men of the Colored Athletics played in Grand Rapids for various reasons, and they impacted the community both on and off the diamond.

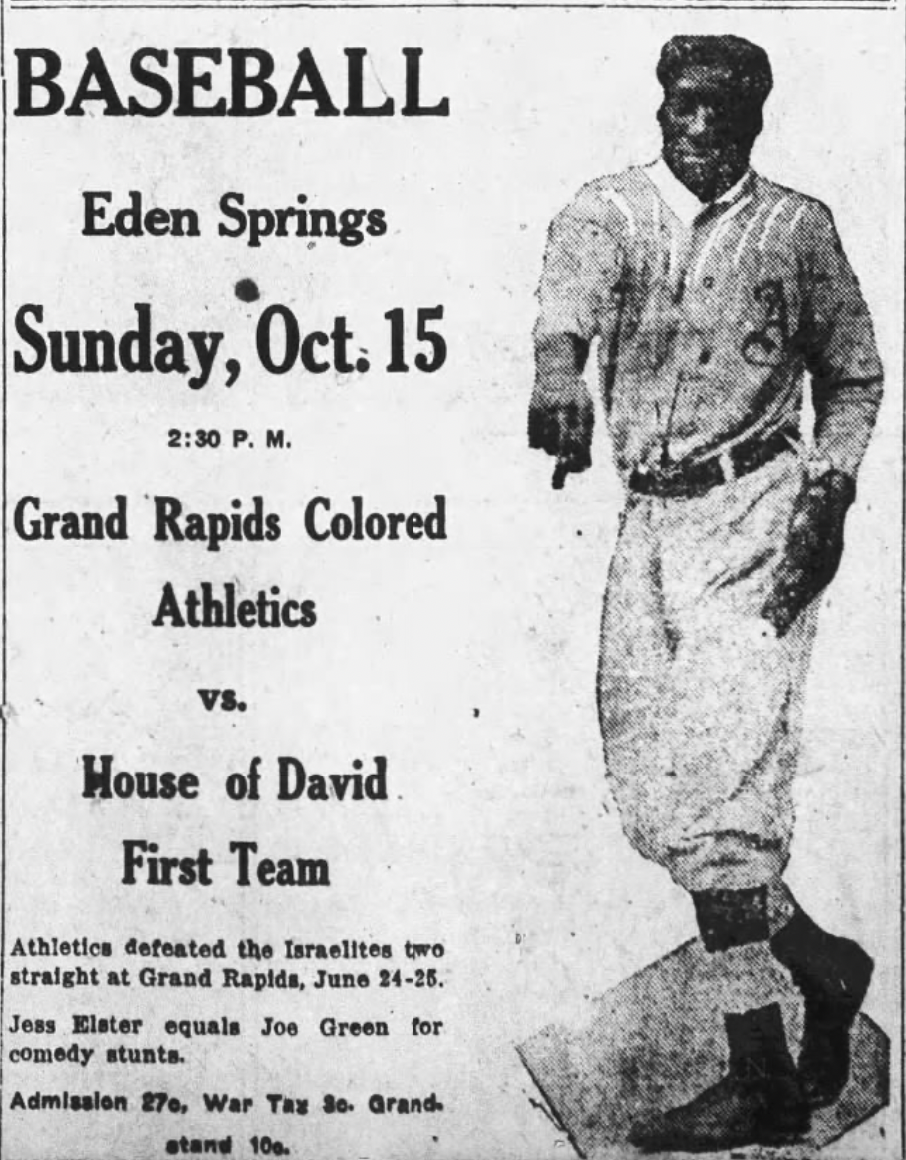
Picture of Jess Elster 1922 - Advertisement for a baseball game between the Grand Rapids Colored Athletics and the House of David

- Jesse "Jess" Elster joined the Colored Athletics in 1905 and remained with the team till his death in 1950. Elster was born and raised in Mt. Sterling, Kentucky. In 1905, the Wernicke Furniture Company, which employed Elster, merged with the Macey Furniture Company of Grand Rapids. Elster remained with the newly formed Macey - Wernicke Company and moved to Grand Rapids. In his forty year baseball career, Jess Elster played as the team's pitcher, catcher, first and second baseman. For many of those years, he was also served as the team manager. In 1922, Elster retired from playing fulltime, but continued to sub for missing team members and played selected innings at first basebase until he was in his sixties. The Colored Athletics player manager also played for and coached the Macey Company team in the 1920s. While the Colored Athletics was disbanded during the first half of the 1930s, Elster made guest appearances with other local African American Grand Rapids semipro teams. After the end of the 1949 season Elster, the man that the Grand Rapid Press referred to as "Mr. Baseball" for much of the previous decade, suffered a heart attack. Although he was advised to avoid stressful activities, the Colored Athletics manager lead the team through the 1950 season. On December 10, 1950, Elster suffered a second heart attack and died at his home. His obituary in The Grand Rapids Press read in part, "Jess Elster, for almost half a century the best known baseball figure in Grand Rapids and western Michigan, is dead." During his career, Elster was an assistant coached the Macey's baseball team which won both the Grand Rapids Industrial Championship and Western Michigan Championship. In 1917 he played for and managed the Colored Athletics to a 22 win and 3 loss record (.880 winning percentage). Based on their record the team proclaimed themselves the Champions of Michigan. In 1946 with Elster still the team's manager, the Colored Athletics were runner-ups for the Michigan Semi-pro Championship. The teams won 38 games and lost 21 (a .644 winning percentage).
- Neil Robinson was discovered and initially played semipro baseball for Elster in 1927 and played sporadically for the Colored Athletics in 1928 and 1929. Robinson would later go on to play 15 years in the Negro Leagues with the Homestead Grays, Cincinnati Tigers, and Memphis Red Sox. He appeared in the Negro League All Star Game (known as the East West Game) 9 times. Robinson was one of 96 Negro League players considered for induction into the Baseball Hall of Fame by the Committee on African American Baseball in 2006. Although Robinson was not selected for induction into the Hall of Fame, his career batting average of .296 and all-star game batting average of .500 made him one of the elite players of his era.
- Johnny Robinson (Neil’s brother) was discovered and initially played semipro baseball for Elster in 1927. Robinson would go on to play Negro League baseball in 1930 for the Memphis Red Sox.
- Ira Lewis played with the team from 1906 to 1908. After his semipro career ended, Ira became a sportswriter for the Pittsburgh Courier, one of the country's leading African American Newspapers. In 1940 he became general manager and president of the paper. He remained in that post till his death in 1948. Lewis was also the president of the Interstate United Newspaper and a regional vice president of the National Negros Publishers Association.
- Ted Rasberry came to Grand Rapids from Mississippi in 1937. He played for the Colored Athletics from 1938 to 1946. During that time, he became part owner and helped manage the team. Rasberry formed the Grand Rapids Black Sox in 1947. In 1954, Rasberry acquired the Detroit Stars of the Negro American League, and in 1956, he purchased the Kansas City Monarchs. Later in life he owned the Harlem Satellites, a barnstorming basketball team, and was a board member of the Negro League Baseball Museum in Kansas City, Missouri. He remained active in the Grand Rapids community until his death in 2001.

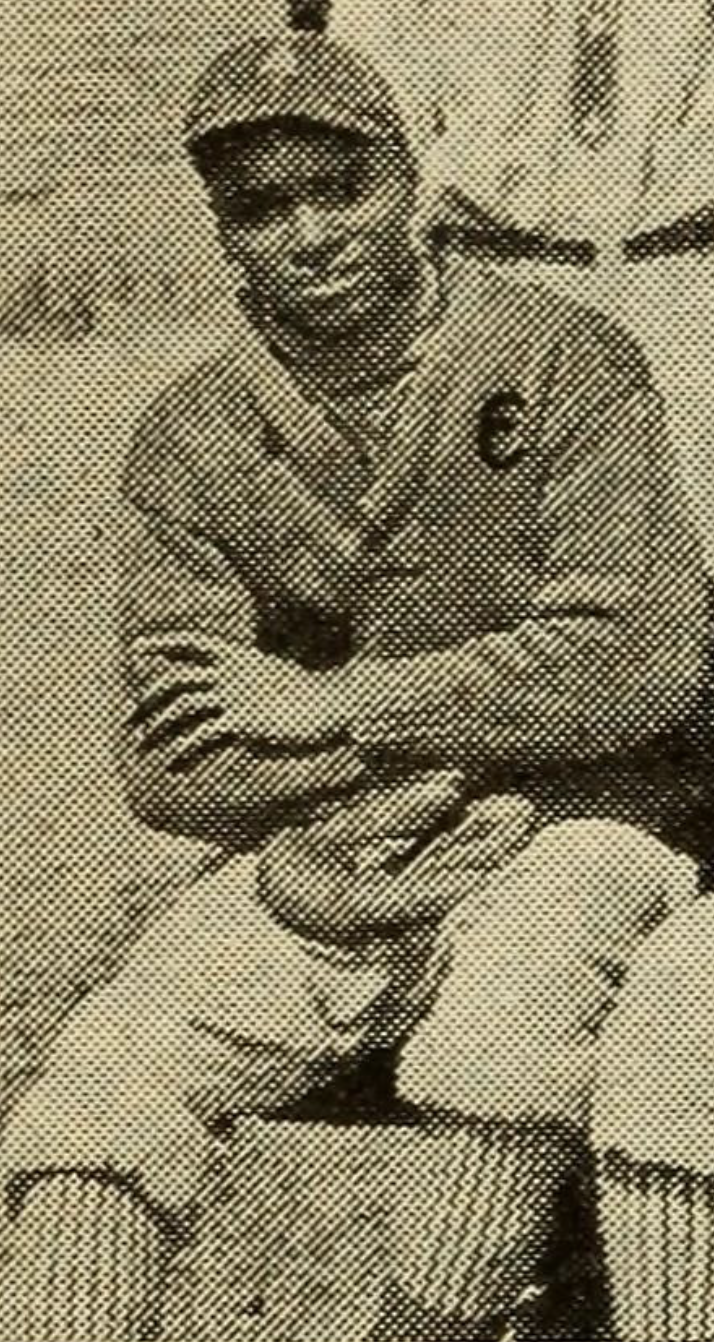
Clearance "Nick" Mabin 1920

- Floyd Skinner graduated from the University of Michigan with a law degree following his baseball career in 1926. In the 1930s he founded the Progressive Voters League which in its first year helped in getting 75% of eligible Grand Rapids African-Americans to the polls. He held the position of president of the local Grand Rapids NAACP for five terms during his career. Yearly the Floyd Skinner Justice GIANT Award is given to a Grand Rapids citizen that exemplifies “a concern for peace and genuine respect for people.” Skinner played with the Colored Athletics from 1917 to 1923.
- Clearance “Nick” Mabin was a long-time pitcher for the Colored Athletics. Mabins pitching hand was deformed in an accident, but it did not inhibit his ability to shut down the opposing team. Mabin was credited with 19 of the 22 wins the team had in 1917 and average 12 strikeouts per game. In a 1906 photo of the team in the Grand Rapid Press he is pictured with the team as a young boy and is listed as the team’s mascot. He was the brother of the Color Athletics founder William Mabin.
- William Nathaniel “Nat” Rogers played with Elster on the Macey’s Nine industrial team and on the Colored Athletics during the 1925 season. Rogers played 21 years in the Professional Negro Leagues with the Brooklyn Royal Giants, Harrisburg Giants, Chicago American Giants, Memphis Red Sox, and Kansas City Monarches. Rogers was one of 96 Negro League players considered for induction into the Baseball Hall of Fame by the Committee on African American Baseball in 2006. The committee ultimately decided not to include him in the 2006 Hall of Fame class. During his long career though Rogers achieved a lifetime batting average in the Professional Negro Leagues of .303 and was part of the 1927 Negro League World Series Championship Chicago American Giants team.
- Johnie Scott played with the Colored Athletics in 1941. Scott would go on to play for the Birmingham Black Barons in 1944 and the Kansas City Monarches from 1944 thru 1948. Scott played in the 1944 North South All Star game and 1946 East West All Star game. The Johnie played with the Monarches during the 1946 Negro League World Series which they lost to the Newark Eagles. He was a teammate of Jackie Robinson.
- John Hawkins played in the Negro Leagues with the New York Black Yankees during the 1940 season. Hawkins was a member of the Colored Athletics from 1938 to 1946.
- Henry Lipsey played in the Negro Leagues with the Memphis Red Sox during the 1942 season. Lipsey was a member of the Colored Athletics from the middle of 1942 to 1946. He went on to play with the Grand Rapids Black Sox.
- Elbert Norman played with the Colored Athletics for part of the 1919 season and throughout the mid 1920s. Elbert played three years in the Negro Leagues. He played with the Chicago American Giants in 1919, the New York Lincoln Giants in 1920, and the Cleveland Elites in 1926.
- Jack Matthews played with the Colored Athletics from 1921 thru 1925. In 1922, Matthews split his playing time between the Colored Athletics and the Negro National League Toledo Tigers.
- Herman "Herm" Purcell pitched in the Negro Leagues for the Memphis Red Sox during the 1947 season. In 1955, Purcell pitched for the Colored Athletics. While in Grand Rapids Purcell also pitched for the Grand Rapids Black Sox.

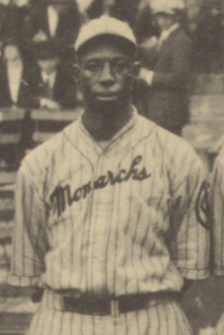
Bill McCall 1924

- Bill (Speeds) McCall played 5 years in the Negro Leagues playing for the Chicago American Giants, Detroit Stars, Cleveland Tate Stars, Pittsburgh Keystones, Birmingham Black Barons, Indianapolis ABCs, and Kansas City Monarchs. He pitched in the first Negro League World Series for the Kansas City Monarchs in 1924. In 1928, McCall came to Grand Rapids and played for the Colored Athletics.
- Walter Coe was recruited and brought to Grand Rapids by Elster in 1917. He played with the Colored Athletics from 1917 till 1927. Elster and community leaders encouraged the city to hire Coe and in 1922 he became the first African American Grand Rapids Police Officer. He obtained the rank of Captain before his death. Annually the Walter Coe Public Service GIANT Award is given to an individual that “exemplifies a demonstrated commitment of helping others with genuine concern and kindness.”
- John Shackelford played sporadically for the team in 1928 and 1929. Shackelford played professionally for the Cleveland Browns in 1924, the Harrisburg Giants in 1925, the Chicago American Giants in 1925, and the Birmingham Black Barons in 1930. Shackelford played for several other African-American semipro Grand Rapids ball clubs in the 1930s. During that time, he also obtained his law degree from the University of Michigan. In 1945 and 1946 Shackelford was named the commissioner of the United States Baseball League (USL). The USL was created as a minor Negro League baseball league by Branch Rickey to prepare African American players for the integration of white Major League Baseball.
- William “Bill” Joyner was a professional player with the Chicago Unions and Chicago Union Giants in 1896, 1897, 1901 and 1902. Joyner played shortstop with the Colored Athletics in 1906.
- Bert Jones was a professional player with the Chicago Unions in 1898 thru 1900. He also played in the Kansas State League (a professional minor league). Jones played 1st base and catcher for the Colored Athletics from 1904 thru 1906. In 1904 Jones broke his leg twice while playing for the Colored Athletics in the span of just over a month.

== Honors ==
The Colored Athletics were inducted into the Grand Rapids Sports Hall of Fame on October 14, 2025. The Hall of Fame stated in its announcement of inductees that the Colored Athletics "were a significant part of Grand Rapids’ semipro baseball scene in the first half of the 1900s."
