= Wakasa =

Wakasa may refer to:

- Wakasa Province, an old province of Japan
  - Wakasa, Fukui, a town in Fukui Prefecture
- Wakasa, Tottori, a town in Tottori Prefecture
  - Wakasa Railway Wakasa Line
  - Wakasa Station, a railway station
- Wakasa Domain, a Japanese domain of the Edo period
- Wakasa (surname), a Japanese surname
- JS Wakasa, a ship of the Japanese Maritime Self-Defense Force

== See also ==
- Wakasa Bay, a bay of Japan
