= Millett Hall =

Multipurpose arena in Oxford, Ohio, US

- Interactive map of Millett Hall
- Location: 500 East Sycamore Street; Oxford, OH 45056
- Coordinates: 39°31′2.05″N 84°44′4.36″W
- Owner: Miami University
- Operator: Miami University
- Capacity: 9,200 (6,400 for basketball)
- Surface: Hardwood

Construction
- Groundbreaking: 1966
- Opened: December 2, 1968
- Cost: $7.5 million ($69.4 million in 2025 dollars)

Tenants
- Miami University men's and women's basketball and women's volleyball

Millett Hall (mil-LETT) is a basketball arena in Oxford, Ohio. It is home to the Miami University men's and women's basketball, and women's volleyball teams. It is also the home of the ROTC program and various university events. It is named after Miami University's 16th President John D. Millett. The original construction cost was approximately $7.5 million. It is located on the northern part of Miami's campus, near Yager Stadium. The arena opened its doors on December 2, 1968, against Adolph Rupp's Kentucky Wildcats. A crowd of 9,135 saw the Wildcats win 86–77. Miami's first win came on December 4, 1968, an 86–67 win over Bellarmine.

== Seating ==
The arena's official capacity is listed as 9,200, Portable bleachers are installed at the north end of the court for the main student section. The south end of the court is reserved for the Pep Band and for the Red Alert student section.

The majority of the seating is located on the sides of the court. These are divided up into an upper and lower bowl. The seats in the lower bowl are a red fabric material, while the upper bowl are a brown color. A large video scoreboard hangs from the center of the arena with statistics.

One of the main complaints with the arena is that the fans are too far away from the action. The arena was built for multi-purpose use and not for athletics. Unlike many of the other arenas in the Mid-American Conference, fans are not on top of the court at Millett. Miami head coach Charlie Coles reflected on this in an interview with the Columbus Dispatch in 2007. "When you play at Millett the fans are so far away, and that has affected our student crowd." He added, "They don't feel like they can be an influence, and young people today like to be an influence. You can't get that momentum. We have to get a large crowd to have an impact on the home arena."

== Future plans ==
In the mid-2020s, real and perceived deficiencies of Millett Hall led the university to consider a new on-campus arena. In February 2025, a committee designated to evaluate sites chose Cook Field, then an open space at the intersection of US 27 and State Route 73 that housed several intramural fields. The university determined that renovating Millett Hall to fully meet the athletic program's needs—among them practice courts for men's and women's basketball, plus a dedicated volleyball venue—would cost at least $175 million, with the renovation requiring that the facility be taken offline for several years. With that as a backdrop, the university's board of trustees authorized construction of a new arena at the Cook Field site on February 27, 2026. The new arena, with an approved budget of $281 million ($242 million for construction), is planned to open for the 2028–29 season. Millett Hall will be demolished once the new arena is complete. New intramural fields were built at two campus locations, one adjacent to Millett Hall, in summer 2026, which allowed Cook Field to be decommissioned that September. More intramural fields, plus a walking path and exercise stations, are planned for the Millett Hall site after demolition.

== Men's basketball ==
Banners hang from the catwalks recognizing Miami's NCAA and NIT tournament appearances. Banners also hang recognizing Miami's 22 Mid-American Conference regular season championships, the first in 1952 and most recently in 2026. There are six retired jerseys at Millett Hall. They include: Ron Harper (34), Wayne Embry (23), Dick Walls (44), Darrell Hedric (86), Wally Szczerbiak (32), and Charlie Coles (10). Harper's jersey was the first to be retired, during halftime of his final home game in 1986. On May 18, 2021, Miami unveiled a statue honoring Wayne Embry, which depicts him shooting his signature hook shot, and declaring the day to be "Wayne Embry Day".

=== Attendance records ===
Attendance	Date	Opponent
10,640	January 31, 2026	Northern Illinois
10,640	February 13, 2026	Ohio
10,640	March 3, 2026	Toledo
10,634	December 15, 1976	Cincinnati
10,127	February 20, 2026	Bowling Green
10,091	December 6, 1995	Xavier
10,085	March 3, 1976	Western Michigan
9,989	February 5, 1994	Ohio
9,896	February 1, 1993	Cincinnati
9,881	November 29, 1988	Indiana
9,842	March 2, 1985	Ohio
9,411	February 19, 1986	Ohio
9,306	February 3, 1996	Ohio

=== Millett Hall records ===
Most Points:

Team- 141 vs. Defiance 12-30-24

Individual- 42 Peter Suder vs. Air Force 12-2-24

Most Combined Points:

212 (Miami 110, Evansville 102) 12-9-89

Field Goals:

Team- 48 vs. Findlay 1-30-74

Individual- 16 Larry Cole vs. Toledo 2-22-75

3-Point Field Goals:

Team- 21 vs. Trinity Christian 11-07-25

Individual- 9 Michael Bramos vs. Dayton 11-28-07

Free Throws

Team- 53 vs. Central Michigan 1-29-92

Individual- 17 Anthony Taylor vs. Wright State 12-18-99

Rebounds:

Team- 68 vs. Cleveland State 11-28-72

Individual- 23 Ron Harper vs. Central Michigan 2-6-86

Assists:

Team- 31 vs. Ball State 2-15-86

Individual- 17 Eddie Schilling vs. Kent State 2-4-87

Blocks:

Team-11 vs. Bowling Green 2-10-88

Individual- 7 Kevin Beard vs. Toledo 1-10-96; Ron Harper vs. Bowling Green 2-5-85

Steals:

Team- 18 vs. Centre 12-2-85

Individual- 7 Ron Harper vs. Marietta 12-1-84; Chuck Goodyear vs. Toledo 2-11-76; Damon Frierson vs. Ball State 2-27-99

== Women's basketball ==
During the 1981-82 season, Miami went a perfect 10–0 at home. They set a record for home wins in a season with 12 during the 1996-97 season. The RedHawks have only suffered six losing seasons at Millett Hall. Mary Ann Myers (20) and Heather Cusick (5) are the two women's jerseys retired at Millett.

=== Millett Hall records ===
Most Points:

Team- 110 vs. Wright State 12-7-02

Individual- 37 Laurie Byrd vs. Eastern Michigan 2-12-81

Field Goals:

Team- 49 vs. Toledo 12-2-78

Individual- 17 Laurie Byrd vs. Eastern Michigan 2-12-81

3-Point Field Goals:

Team- 17 vs. Ohio 1-31-26

Individual- 9 Jamie Stewart vs. Bowling Green 1-22-00

Free Throws

Team- 44 vs. Central Michigan 1-3-98

Individual- 15 Hollie Nelsen vs. Central Michigan 1-3-98

Rebounds:

Team- 61 vs. Northern Illinois 1-19-85

Individual- 25 Leslie Schultz vs. Purdue 12-2-81

Assists:

Team- 34 vs. Western Illinois 3-11-82

Individual- 15 Nikki Kremer vs. Xavier 12-12-86

Blocks:

Team-10 vs. Northern Illinois 2-4-06

Individual- 8 Heidi Gillingham vs. Vanderbilt 2-15-92

Steals:

Team- 27 vs. Toledo 12-2-78

Individual- 10 Lindsay Austin vs. Bowling Green 2-3-04

== Volleyball ==
Prior to the 1985 season, the volleyball team played at Withrow Court since they began play in 1974. The longest home winning streak is 17, starting on September 12, 1998, and ending on September 4, 1999. The 1998 team went a perfect 12–0 against Mid-American Conference opponents. The largest crowd to watch volleyball at Millett came during the 1995 Volleyball Championship, when over 1,000 fans attended.

== Other events ==
Millett Hall has hosted many other events and speakers. Past performers include Elton John, Simon and Garfunkel, Jethro Tull, Dave Matthews and Tim Reynolds, Widespread Panic, The Allman Brothers Band, Tony Bennett, Bill Cosby, Andy Williams, Ray Charles, Barry Manilow, James Taylor, Sting, Bob Dylan, Phil Lesh and Friends, Charlie Daniels, Gladys Knight, John Cougar Mellencamp, Don Henley, Yes, Hootie and the Blowfish, Dave Chappelle, Jay Leno, Lupe Fiasco, Three 6 Mafia, Bruce Springsteen, Fleetwood Mac, R.E.M., Bob Hope, George Burns, Talking Heads, 50 Cent, John Mulaney, and Seth Meyers.

It was also the site of Miami University's bicentennial ball held on February 21, 2009, as the university celebrated the 200th anniversary of its charter signed February 17, 1809.

== Gallery ==
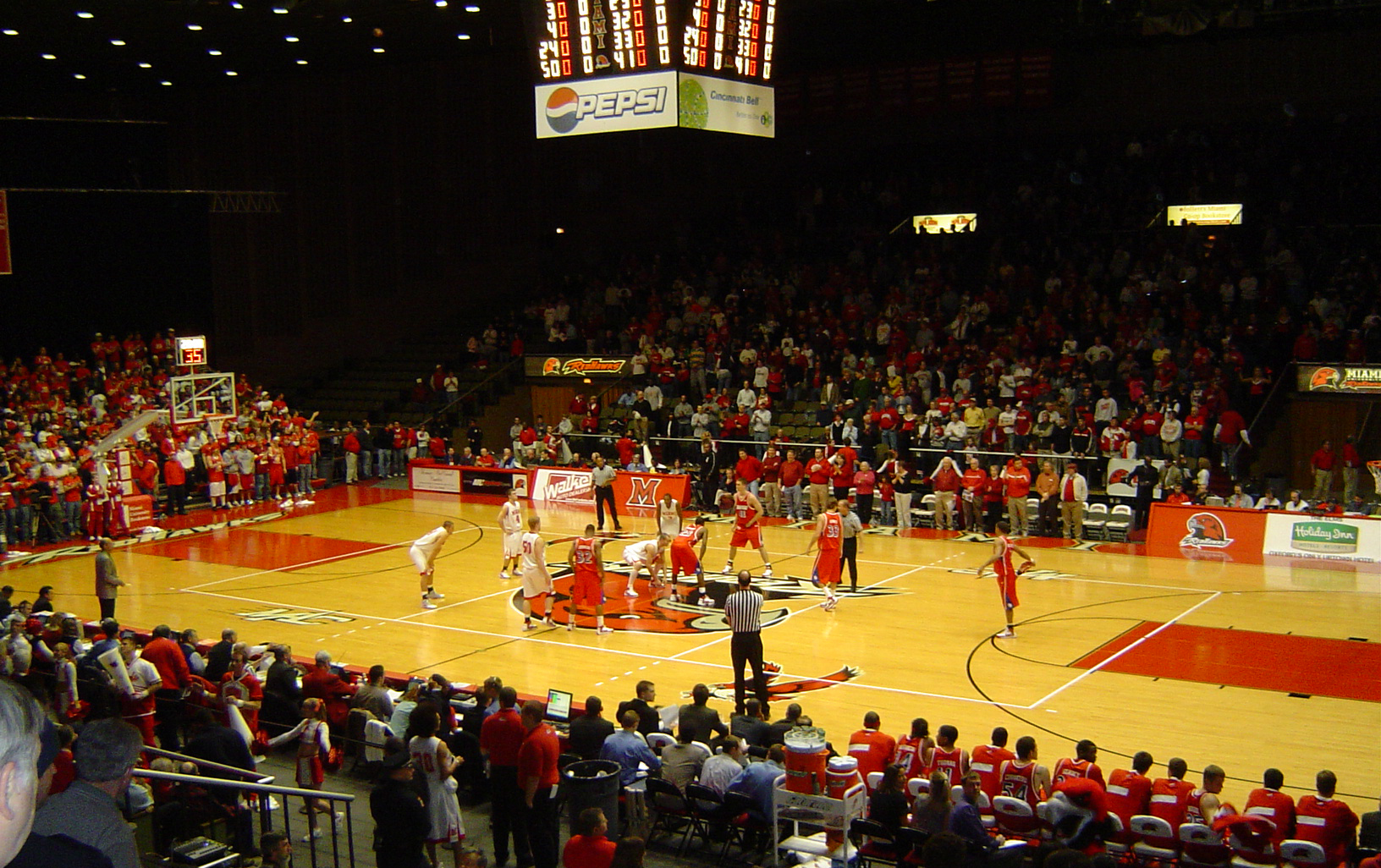
Interior during a men's basketball game

Concourse level view

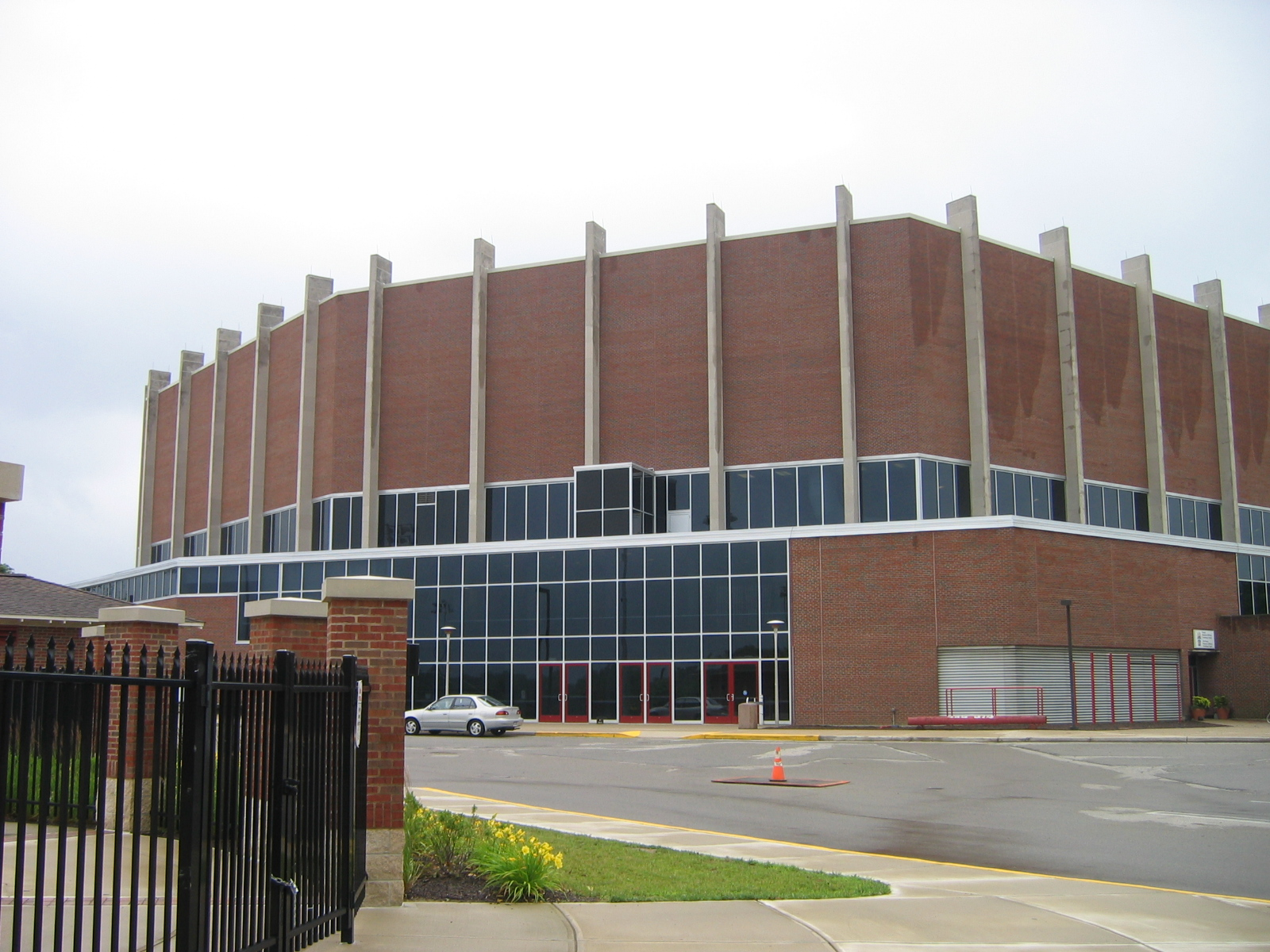
Exterior view from rear

== See also ==
- List of NCAA Division I basketball arenas
