= Cor Huijbregts =

Dutch footballer

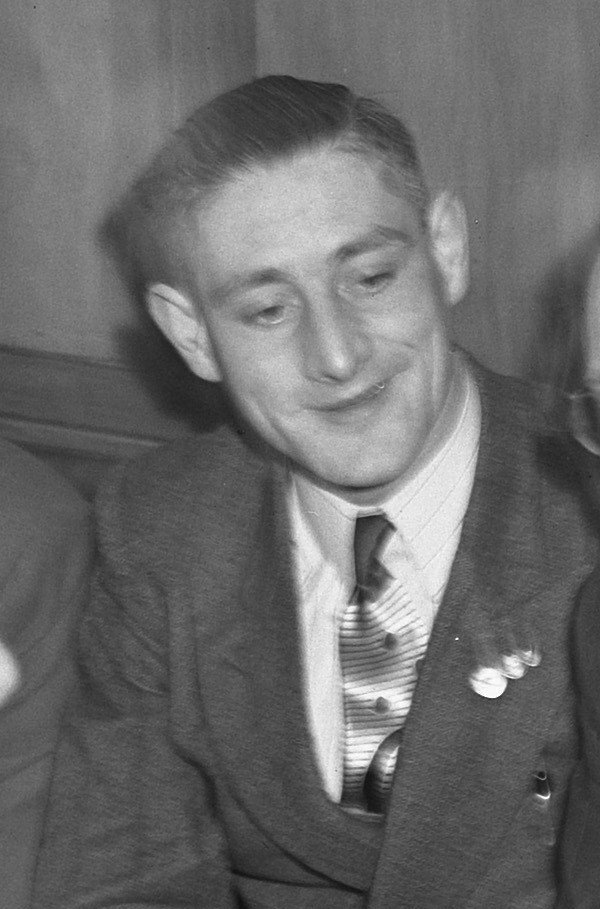
- Huijbregts in 1950

Personal information
- Date of birth: 8 June 1920
- Place of birth: 's-Graveland, Netherlands
- Date of death: 24 December 2005 (aged 85)
- Place of death: 's-Hertogenbosch, Netherlands
- Position: Rightback

Youth career
- 1935–: BVV

Senior career*
Years	Team	Apps	(Gls)
-1940	Picus/De Spechten		
1945	Concordia SVD		
1945–1956	BVV		

International career
1950	Netherlands	3	(0)
- * Club domestic league appearances and goals

Cor Huijbregts (8 June 1920 – 24 December 2005) was a Dutch footballer. He played in three matches for the Netherlands national football team in 1950.

Born in 's-Graveland, Huijbregts moved to Den Bosch in 1935 and joined the BVV youth set-up. He was detained shortly in Prisoner of War-camp Luckenwalde during World War II but returned to BVV after the war.

He won the 1948 league title with BVV playing alongside fellow international defenders Kees Krijgh and Piet van der Sluijs. He died in Den Bosch in 2005.

He was a police officer by profession.
