= Wakasa (surname) =

Wakasa (written: 若狭 or 輪笠) is a Japanese surname. Notable people with the surname include:

- Kody Wakasa (born 1994), American soccer player
- Koji Wakasa (若狭 浩嗣, born 1953), Japanese ice hockey player
- Masaru Wakasa (若狭 勝, born 1956), Japanese lawyer and politician
- Masashi Wakasa (若狭 大志, born 1989), Japanese footballer
- Minoru Wakasa (若狭 実, born 1951), Japanese ski jumper
- Tokuji Wakasa (若狭 得治, 1914–2005), Japanese businessman
- Yuji Wakasa (輪笠 祐士, born 1996), Japanese footballer
