= Neil Robinson (baseball) =

American baseball player (1907–1983)

- Center fielder
- Born: Cornelius Randall Robinson; July 31, 1907; Birmingham, Alabama
- Died: July 23, 1983 (aged 75); Cincinnati, Ohio
- Batted: Right Threw: Right

Negro league baseball debut
- 1934, for the Homestead Grays

Last appearance
- 1952, for the Memphis Red Sox

Career statistics
- Batting average: .303
- Home runs: 29

Teams
- Negro leagues: Homestead Grays (1934); Cincinnati Tigers (1935–1937); Memphis Red Sox (1938–1952); Aguadilla Baseball Club (1939–1940)

Career highlights and awards
- 9× All-Star (1938–1941, 1943–1945, 1948)

Cornelius Randall Robinson (July 31, 1907 – July 23, 1983), known professionally as Neil Robinson, was a major league baseball player in the segregated Negro leagues. Also known by the nicknames Neal and Shadow, he primarily played as a center fielder in the 1930s and 1940s, but as a semipro player he alternated between the outfield, shortstop, and third baseman. For the majority of his twenty-three year career, Robinson played for the Memphis Red Sox. Prior to being acquired by Memphis, he played one season for the Homestead Grays and three seasons with the Cincinnati Tigers.

Throughout his career, he was known as a power hitter and ranks as the greatest hitter in the history of Memphis Red Sox franchise. Robinson won back-to-back Negro American League home run titles in 1939 and 1940 and appeared in nine Negro League East-West All Star Games. In the history of the East-West All Star Game, Robinson ranks as one of the Midsummer Classic's greatest hitters rivaling Mule Suttles, Josh Gibson, and Ted Strong.

Robinson also played several exhibition games against white Major League Baseball players throughout his career. Although his number of plate appearances were limited, Robinson's ability to put the baseball in play against his white counterparts exceeded his career statistics against that of Negro league opponents. In 2006, he was selected as one of ninety-six candidates to be considered for induction into the Baseball Hall of Fame by The Committee on African American Baseball. Despite not being selected, elite hitting and longevity made Robinson one of the great Negro league players with an extended career in the Deep South.

== Early life ==
Robinson was born in Birmingham, Alabama on July 31, 1907, to Cornell Robinson and Flora Fitzpatrick. The middle child of three, Robinson grew up in the small community of Opelika. His father Cornell worked as a porter in Alabama and nearby Columbus, Georgia. In Opelika, Robinson learned to play baseball at a very young age. When asked by a reporter about his fielding abilities during a semipro game, Robinson remarked that he had, "been practicing how to throw a ball since I was old enough to carry a bat." In 1919, Cornell Robinson died. Shortly after his death, Robinson's mother moved the family north to Gary, Indiana. The Robinson children all found work in the booming industrial town. Neil and his brother John worked as laborers while their younger sister, Florida, found worked as a maid. During their time in Gary, Neil and John were introduced to Gary's industrial baseball teams and their, mostly Chicago based, opponents. By 1928, both brothers were playing on semipro barnstorming teams.

== Baseball ==
=== Semi-Pro ===
In 1927, Robinson and his brother moved to Grand Rapids, Michigan to play for the semi-pro Grand Rapids Colored Athletics. The following year the brothers start the season with the Illinois Giants. The Giants, based out of the Chicago area, were a barnstorming team that traveled through Illinois, Indiana, and Michigan. By June of that year though, the brothers had returned to Grand Rapids and were playing for the Fox Jewelry Colored Giants. Robinson would play for the Fox Giants through 1929. In 1930 the brothers moved south and both signed with the Lexington Hard Hitters. Robinson would also play several games for the Lockland Valley Tigers that year, but for the majority of the season he was a member of the Hard Hitters. In 1931 Neil played for both the Gary, Indiana Steel City Giants and the Gray Grasselli Giants. He returned to Grand Rapids playing for the Fineis Oils Giants in 1932 and the Pere Marquette Giants in 1933.

During his time in Grand Rapids and Lexington, Robinson was known for both his hitting and fielding. Robinson was selected as part of a Grand Rapids All-Star team on three occasions to play major league teams. He took part in exhibition games against the Philadelphia Athletics, Detroit Tigers, and St. Louis Cardinals. In twelve at bats, he had five hits.

=== Homestead Grays ===
In 1934, Robinson was hired by Cumberland Posey to play for the Homestead Grays. He replaced outfielder Vic Harris who was now a member of the Pittsburgh Crawfords. Robinson's batting average at the end of the 1934 season was .241. 1934 was his only season with the Grays. A drinking problem that would plague Robinson throughout his career led to his dismissal from the team.

=== Cincinnati Tigers ===
Robinson played with the Cincinnati Tigers from 1935 to 1937. In 1935 and 1936, the Tigers were a member of the Indiana-Ohio League and associate with both the Negro National League and the Negro Southern League. In 1937, the Tigers joined the newly formed Negro American League. Robinson would develop into a power hitter while playing in Cincinnati. In 1936 he batted .419 and in 1937 his average was .301. In 1936, Robinson reportedly hit the longest home run in the Sherwood Oval. The ball "hit the 472-foot sign on about three bounces." He finished the 1936 season with 34 home runs against all levels of competition.

=== Memphis Red Sox ===
At the end of the 1937 season, despite their success on the field, the Cincinnati Tigers disbanded. The Memphis Red Sox, also founding members of the Negro American League, acquired Robinson and several other players from the Tigers as the 1938 season started. Robinson remained with the Red Sox for fifteen years until his retirement in 1952. During that time he was the team's top player and biggest attraction. From 1938 to 1948 he was Memphis’ leading hitter with 167 RBIs and a batting average of .299. Over the 38-year history of the Memphis Red Sox, Robinson was the greatest hitter the team would ever have on its roster.

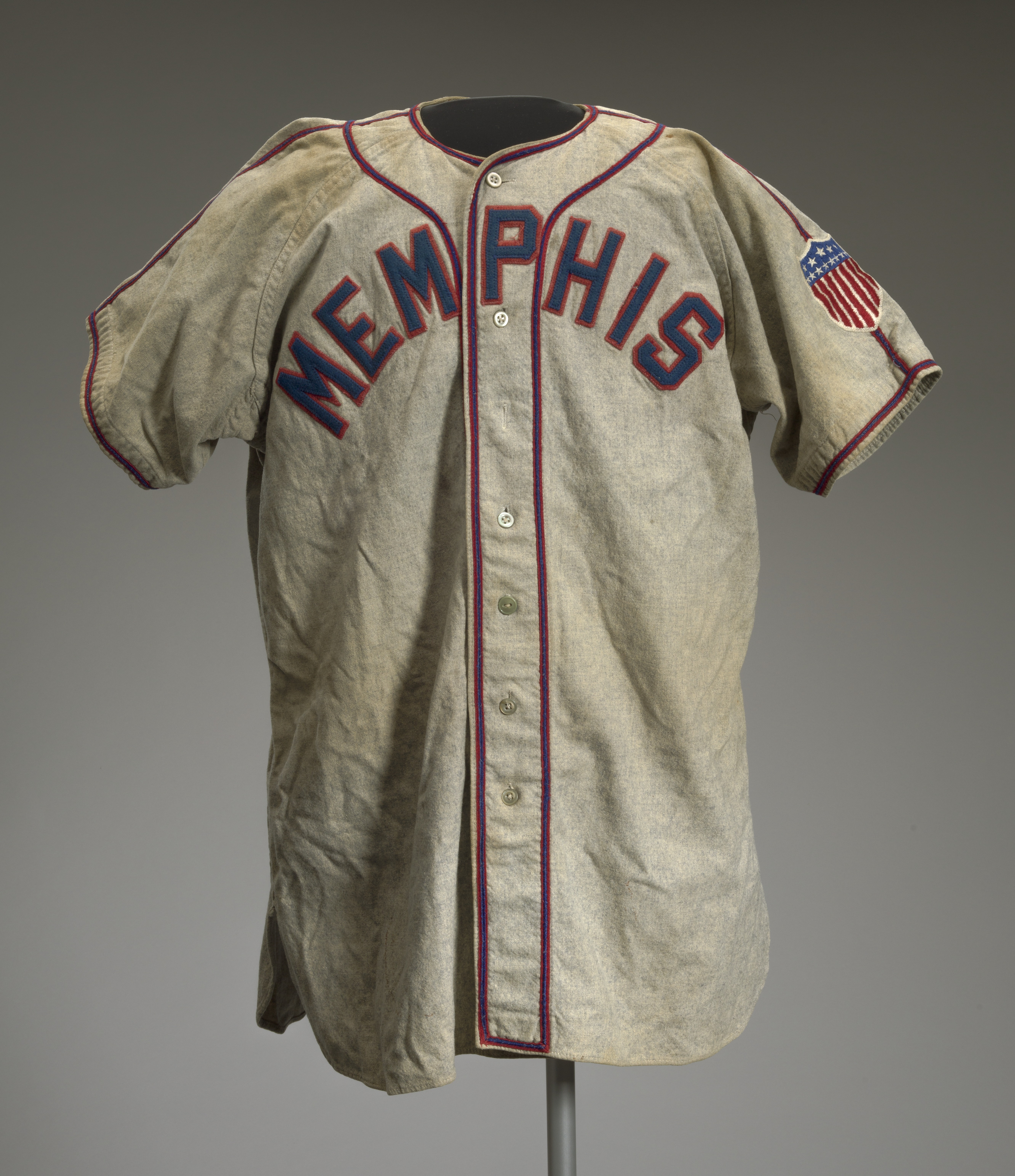
Neil Robinson's jersey during his time with the Memphis Red Sox.

The new talent that Memphis acquired from the former Tigers, including Robinson, had an immediate effect on the team. The Red Sox were in first place at the end of the first half of the 1938 season which earned them a spot in league championship series against the Atlanta Black Crackers. In the abbreviated two-game series Robinson led the Red Sox offense by going four for four with a walk, two home runs, five RBIs.

Robinson played in his first East-West All Star game in 1938. His inside the park home run scored three runs and led the West to a 5–4 victory over the East.

In 1939 Robinson continued to hit the baseball out of park for the Red Sox. This led the Memphis Commercial Appeal newspaper to dub him the “negro home run artist.” Neil hit twenty-five home runs against league teams in both barnstorming games and official league games. He hit fifty-four home runs against all levels of competition. While Robinson's batting average dropped to .275, another home run at the East-West All Star game helped lead the West to victory.

Between 1940 and 1948, Robinson batted greater than .300 over a season four more times. In 1943, Robinson's boyhood home of Gray, Indiana held a “Neil Robinson Day.” The game was between the East Chicago Giants and the Chicago Brown Bombers at E. J. Block Stadium in East Chicago. Robinson played center field for the East Chicago Giants who won 6–1. The following year “Neil Robinson Day” was celebrated at Wrigley Field. The Memphis Red Sox played a double header against the Kansas City Monarchs. Robinson marked the occasion by hitting a home run off of the Monarchs pitcher Satchel Paige. The Red Sox won both games. Earlier that year, on the south side of Chicago, Robinson hit a grand slam at Comiskey Stadium against the Chicago American Giants.

At the end of the 1948 Negro American League season, Robinson played with the Kansas City Royals. The Royals were a collection of the Negro League All-Stars including Satchel Paige, who was now a member of the Cleveland Indians. The Royals played a team of Major League All-Stars headed by Cleveland Indians pitcher Bob Lemon. The Kansas City Royals won three of the six games they played against Lemon's All-Stars. Robinson had three hits in nine at bats and a total of four RBIs.

In 1951, the last full year that Robinson played baseball, Howe News Bureau listed his batting average as .416 in the early part of June. Robinson was again voted to attend the East-West All-Star game, but due to injuries he was unable to play. Robinson finished the year batting hitting .344. During the postseason, he played as part of a Negro League All-Star team against Roy Campanella's Major League All-Stars.

== Basketball ==
Robinson played semipro basketball in both the winter of 1930 and 1931 for Gilkerson's Union Giants. He played as one of the teams Forwards and was called “Shadow” by his teammates, a nickname that was given to him due to his quickness on the court. The team also included olympian Sol Butler and Harlem Globetrotter founder Tommy Brookins.

== Later life and death ==
Robinson lived in Cincinnati until his death on July 23, 1983.
