= Henry Kock =

Henry Kock (1952 – December 25, 2005) was a noted horticulturist, eco-activist, and founder of the Elm Recovery Project in Ontario.

Kock was born in Sarnia, Ontario, and grew up working for the family business, Huronview Nurseries. A graduate of the University of Guelph in 1977 with an emphasis on horticulture, he stayed connected to the university until his death. Affectionately known as "Mr. Arboretum", he was diagnosed with brain cancer in July 2004; he finally succumbed to the disease on Christmas Day, 2005, at the age of 53.

== Legacies ==
After the devastating effects of Dutch elm disease on the provincial elm population, Kock created the Elm Recovery Project, collecting scions from the survivors, developing a breeding program and raising the young trees for eventual restoration of DED-tolerant elms in the wild. Another notable legacy left by Kock is the Guelph Hillside Festival, which he co-founded. Celebrated every year in July at Guelph Lake, just north of the city, folk and other musical acts gather for a three-day weekend event attended by hundreds of people.

== Other projects ==
Kock was also known for his many activist activities, especially those regarding plants. He helped to organize the first Guelph Organic Conference, which has increased in popularity each year. He rallied for peace in Iraq, renewable energy, public transit and urban bicycling, as well as being a regular attendee of the International Women's Day in Toronto each year with his wife. At the time of his death he was working on a book on growing native trees from seed, a project which some of his botany colleagues at the University of Guelph Arboretum completed. Additionally, Kock often travelled the province with talks and slide shows about protecting wild placing, propagating native plant species, and alternatives to garden pesticides. Most notably, however, Kock is recognized for establishing gene banks for rare native plants, including elms.

== Accolades ==
- 1998 - Governor General's Award for Forest Stewardship
- 1999 - Forest Stewardship in Canada Award
- 2004 - Named one of two of Canada's best naturalists by Gardening Life magazine

== Family ==
Kock met Anne Hansen in 1991, whom he later married. He is survived by his wife Anne; his parents Mary and Dick of Bright's Grove; his brother John Cook and his wife Cynthia in Forest; his sister Helen Rykens and her husband Dan McDermott in Toronto; and a niece and two nephews. He was predeceased by his sister Irene.
