= Piet van der Sluijs =

Dutch footballer

Personal information
- Date of birth: 17 September 1918
- Date of death: 6 November 1990 (aged 72)

International career
| Years | Team | Apps | (Gls) |
| 1949–1950 | Netherlands | 3 | (0) |

Piet van der Sluijs (17 September 1918 – 6 November 1990) was a Dutch footballer. He played in three matches for the Netherlands national football team from 1949 to 1950.
