= Horace Ellis Crouch =

United States Air Force officer

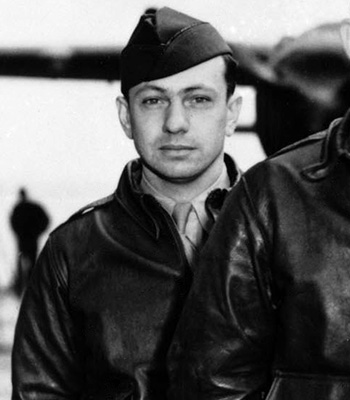
- Born: October 29, 1918; Columbia, South Carolina
- Died: December 21, 2005 (aged 87); Columbia, South Carolina
- Burial place: Greenlawn Memorial Park; Columbia, South Carolina
- Military career
- Allegiance: United States
- Branch: Army National Guard; United States Army Air Corps; United States Air Force
- Service years: 1937–1962
- Rank: Lieutenant colonel
- Nickname: Sally
- Conflicts: World War II; Doolittle Raid; China Burma India Theater; Korean War
- Awards: Silver Star; Distinguished Flying Cross; Air Medal; Congressional Gold Medal; Order of the Palmetto

Lieutenant Colonel Horace Ellis Crouch (October 29, 1918 – December 21, 2005) was an American military aviator whose career included service with the United States Army Air Corps and United States Air Force, he was a combat veteran of World War II and the Korean War who served as one of the crewmembers on the Doolittle Raid.

== Early life ==
Crouch was a native of Columbia, South Carolina, he attended Columbia High School and earned a bachelor's degree in Civil Engineering from The Citadel graduating in 1940; while a cadet he also served as a member of the South Carolina Army National Guard. Commissioned into the Army Air Corps, he became triple qualified as a Navigator, Bombardier and Radar Operator then was assigned to the 89th Reconnaissance Squadron of the 17th Bombardment Group based at Pendleton Airport, Oregon which flew the new North American B-25 Mitchell medium bomber.

On December 5, 1941, he married Mary Epting (1919–2001), a childhood friend and high school classmate, while on their honeymoon they learned of the Japanese attack on Pearl Harbor that led to the United States entry into World War II.

== World War II and later military service ==
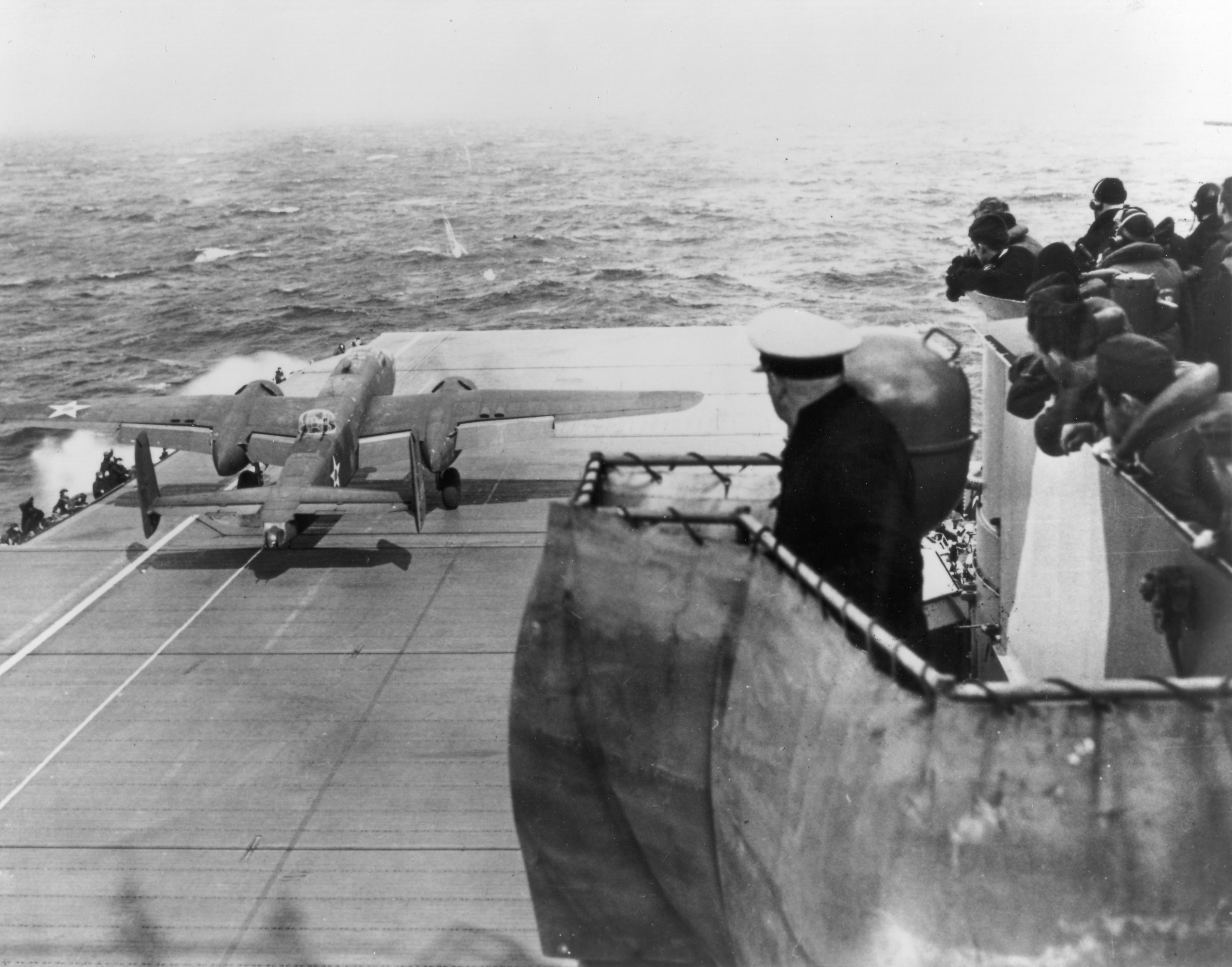
One of the Doolittle Raiders aircraft takes off from the U.S.S Hornet on April 18, 1942

In early 1942, Crouch was one of 80 volunteers (from an original pool of 120) chosen for a secret mission to be led by Lieutenant Colonel Jimmy Doolittle, a surprise raid on Japan conducted by 16 B-25s flown off the aircraft carrier USS Hornet (CV-8). The "Doolittle Raiders" trained at Columbia Army Air Base in South Carolina and Eglin Field in Florida before sailing from Naval Air Station Alameda, California for Japan aboard the Hornet on April 2, 1942. Crouch served as the Bombardier, Navigator and Nose Gunner of Crew #10 flying on aircraft serial number 40-2250 which included Pilot Lt. Richard Joyce, Co-Pilot Lt. Royden Stork, Engineer/Turret Gunner Sgt. George Larkin and Gunner SSgt. Edward Horton.

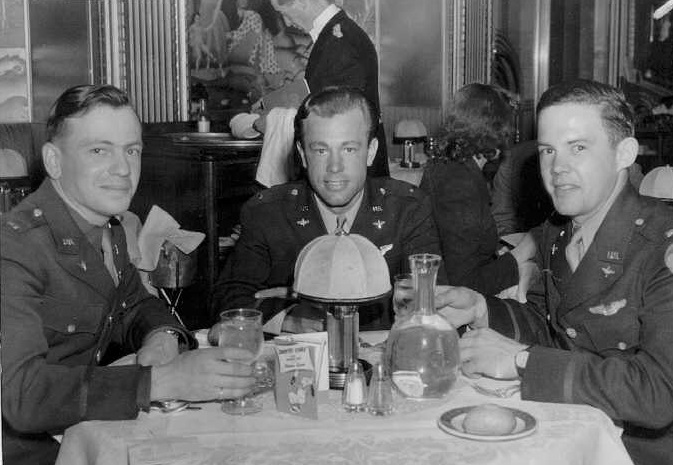
Crouch(left) with fellow crewmembers Richard Joyce and Royden Stork having dinner in San Francisco the night before departing for the Doolittle Raid

After launching off the Hornet on April 18 their aircraft struck targets in Tokyo and was credited with shooting down 2 Japanese fighters, the only enemy aircraft destroyed on the mission. After dropping their bombs, they flew on to China where the crew bailed out and were escorted to safety by local Chinese guerillas. Crouch remained in the China Burma India Theater until June 1943, serving with the 11th Bomb Squadron of the 341st Bombardment Group initially at bases in India and later at Kunming, China. After serving briefly in Japan after wars end Crouch left active duty in 1947 and joined the newly organized Air Force Reserve, he was recalled to active duty in 1948 with the newly independent United States Air Force and was assigned as Deputy State Director of the Selective Service System in Columbia, South Carolina. He returned to flying duty as a Navigator on the Boeing B-29 Superfortress flying combat missions during the Korean War while assigned to the 307th Bomb Wing at Kadena Air Base on Okinawa. After subsequent service with the 301st Bomb Wing and 4th Air Division at Barksdale AFB, Louisiana, he was Chief of Intelligence for the 68th Bomb Wing at Lake Charles AFB, Louisiana then became qualified as an Aircraft Observer on the Boeing B-47 Stratojet. He resigned his commission in 1957 but returned to active duty as an enlisted Photo Interpretation Specialist and Intelligence Analyst serving in Germany and Shaw AFB, South Carolina, he retired in 1962 but reverted to his highest grade of lieutenant colonel.

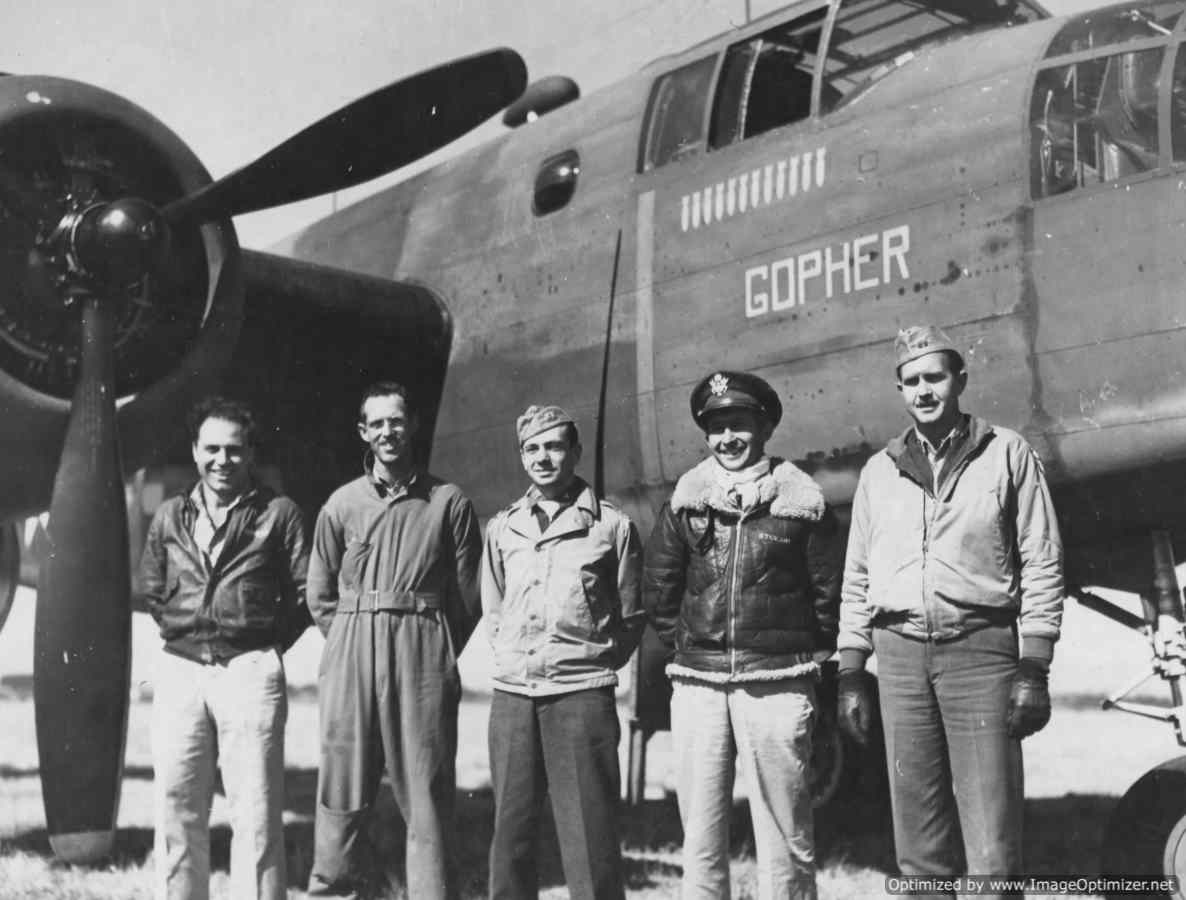
Horace Crouch (center) while serving with the 341st Bomb Group in China, 1943

== Later life ==
Crouch was a high school math and drafting teacher at Columbia High school for another 20 years after his military service and earned a master's degree from Clemson University. He was a member of the Doolittle Raiders Association and American Legion, his military awards included the Silver Star, Distinguished Flying Cross, Air Medal with Oak Leaf Cluster and the Republic of China Armed Forces Medal Class A 1st Grade. In 1998, he was inducted into the South Carolina Aviation Hall of Fame. He was also recipient of the Order of the Palmetto, the highest award given by the State of South Carolina. In 2014, the Doolittle Raiders were awarded a Congressional Gold Medal.

== Awards and decorations ==
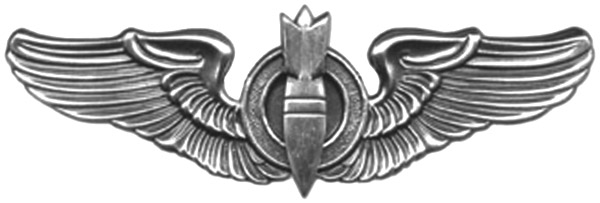
Bombardier Badge (Army Air Corps)
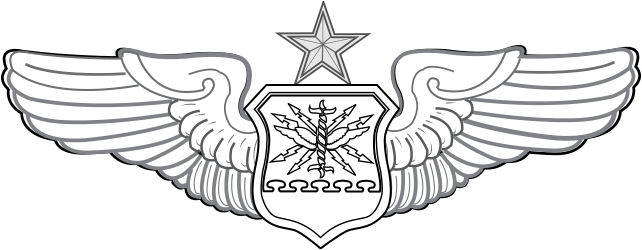
U.S. Air Force Senior Navigator/Observer Badge
Silver Star
Distinguished Flying Cross
Air Medal with Oak Leaf Cluster
Army Good Conduct Medal
American Defense Service Medal
American Campaign Medal
Asiatic-Pacific Campaign Medal
World War II Victory Medal
Army of Occupation Medal
National Defense Service Medal
Korean Service Medal
Armed Forces Reserve Medal
Air Force Longevity Service Award with 4 Oak Leaf Clusters
Medal of the Armed Forces, A-1 (Republic of China)
Presidential Unit Citation (Korea)
United Nations Service Medal
