= Norman Blundell =

Australian cricketer

Personal information
- Full name: Norman Charles Blundell
- Born: 2 September 1917; Carlton, Melbourne, Australia
- Died: 9 December 2005 (aged 88); Cheltenham, Melbourne, Australia
- Batting: Left-handed
- Bowling: Leg-break and googly

Domestic team information
- Years: Team
- 1946-47 to 1951-52: Victoria

Career statistics
Competition	First-class
Matches	8
Runs scored	125
Batting average	15.62
100s/50s	0/0
Top score	39*
Balls bowled	1142
Wickets	22
Bowling average	28.45
5 wickets in innings	1
10 wickets in match	0
Best bowling	5/37
Catches/stumpings	7/–
- Source: Cricinfo, 15 May 2019

Norman Blundell (2 September 1917 – 9 December 2005) was an Australian cricketer. He played eight first-class cricket matches for Victoria between 1946 and 1951.

Blundell played district cricket for the Colts, Essendon and Footscray. Over 197 First XI matches he scored 4554 runs at 24.2, and took 495 wickets at 19.3. As of 2023/24, he holds the district/premier record for best match bowling figures, when he took 17/117 (9/49 & 8/68) for Essendon against Hawthorn-East Melbourne in 1946/47.

== See also ==
- List of Victoria first-class cricketers
