= John Beale (virologist) =

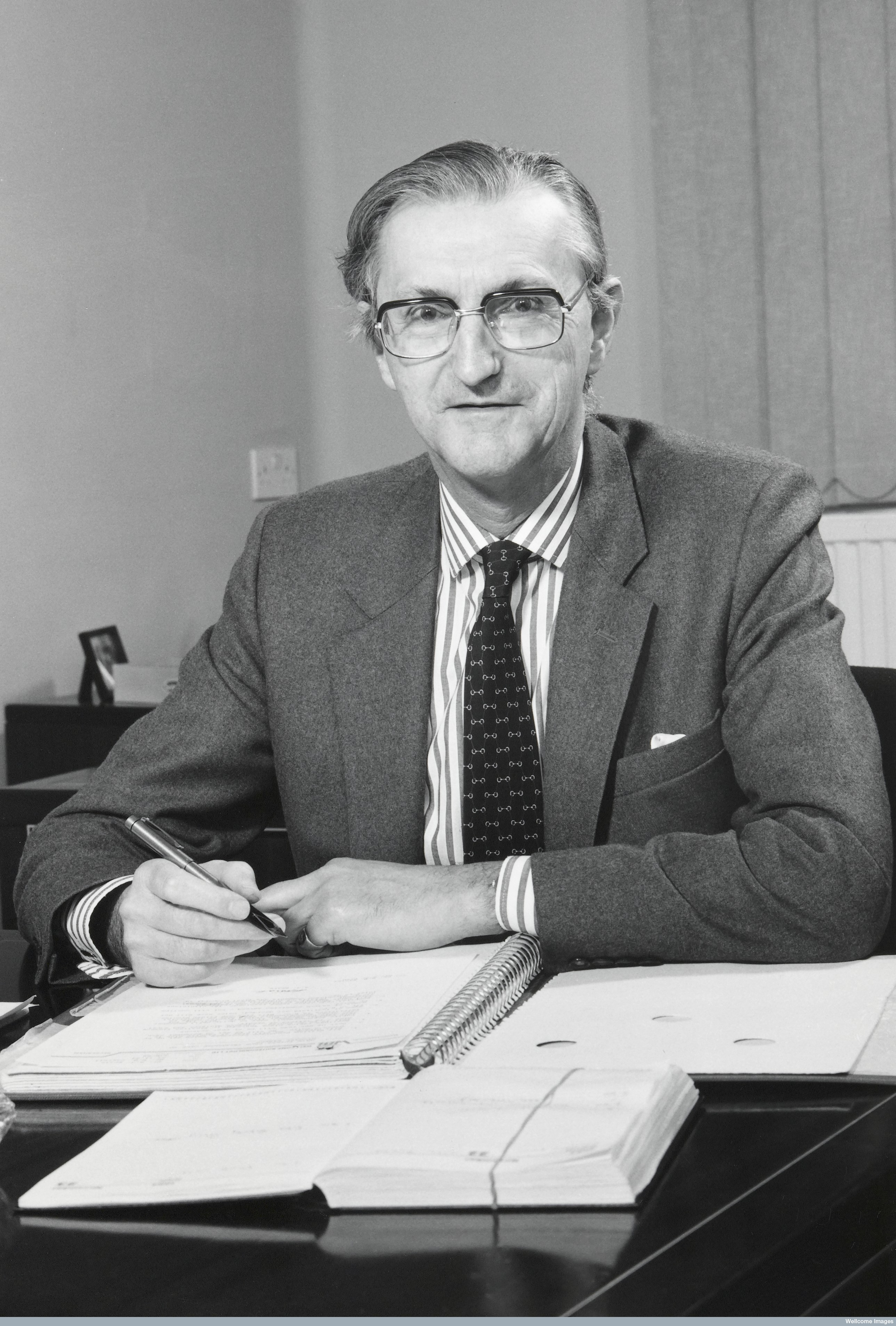
- At the Wellcome Trust in 1970
- Born: Alan John Beale; 23 July 1923; Sussex
- Died: 9 December 2005 (aged 82); Sissinghurst, Kent, England
- Known for: Virologist Pioneering vaccine development
- Spouse: Rosemary
- Children: Nick, Liz

Alan John Beale (23 July 1923 - 9 December 2005) was a leading expert on vaccines and viruses. While working for Glaxo, he was responsible for starting the industrial scale production of Jonas Salk's vaccine against polio.

== History ==
In 1958, Beale headed a team that isolated some of the viruses that cause croup while working in The Hospital for Sick Children, Toronto.
