= Elizabeth Parcells =

American coloratura soprano

Elizabeth Parcells (/pɑːrˈsɛlz/; December 28, 1951 in Detroit, Michigan – December 29, 2005 in Detroit, Michigan) was an American coloratura soprano. In the United States, she sang at the Michigan Opera Theater, the Boston Lyric Opera and The Washington (D.C.) Opera, among others.

She began voice lessons at age 16 and went on to study at the Interlochen Arts Academy. She earned her undergraduate and graduate degrees with honors from the New England Conservatory of Music (Boston).

Parcells was a winner of the 1977 Metropolitan Opera National Council Auditions in New York City and was awarded a Pro Musicis Foundation sponsorship which helped launch her professional singing career. She moved to Switzerland and participated in the Opera Studio of Zürich Opera then moved to Germany where she sang at Augsburg, Wiesbaden, Frankfurt, West Berlin, Basel, Switzerland and Stuttgart. During her concert career, Parcells sang at international festivals such as Tanglewood, Salzburg, Touraine, Bologne, Colorado, Luxembourg, Melk, Lisbon, Rheingau, Huddersfield and Torino. She recorded with the BBC, National Public Radio, Radio France, WDR Cologne and the Radio Luxembourg Orchestra.

Her roles included Olympia in Tales of Hoffmann, Norina in Don Pasquale, Zerbinetta in Ariadne auf Naxos, Queen of the Night in The Magic Flute, and the title characters in Lucia di Lammermoor and Maria Stuarda.

Parcells' farewell recital was given at the Weill Recital Hall at Carnegie Hall in February 2005 under the sponsorship of the Pro Musicis Foundation.

After living and working in Europe for over twenty years, where she was married in Germany to Dierk-Eckhard Becker, Hamburg in 1985, Parcells returned home to Grosse Pointe, Michigan in 1997 to coach voice students at Oakland University in Rochester Hills and at Schoolcraft College in Livonia, Michigan. In Germany Parcells worked as a voice instructor at the University of Bremen until 1997.

She died of colorectal cancer at age 54.
