= Maclovia Ruiz =

Mexican-American dancer

- Born: September 11, 1910; Guadalajara, Jalisco, Mexico
- Died: December 31, 2005 (aged 95); Pinole, California
- Occupation: Ballerina

Maclovia Ruiz Mailer (11 September 1910 – 31 December 2005) was a Mexican-American dancer in the 1930s with the San Francisco Ballet. She also had the lead role in a piece choreographed by George Balanchine for the 1936 production of Carmen at the Metropolitan Opera House.

Born in Guadalajara, Jalisco, in Mexico, Ruiz was the eldest of three daughters. She moved with her family to San Francisco in 1914, arriving by the S.S. Peru. She was taught folk dancing by her father. She would perform in neighborhood clubs, but local dance schools discriminated against her because of her skin color and ethnic background. At the age of 10, she finally gained acceptance into the Peters Wright Dance School, where she studied interpretive dance while performing on the vaudeville circuit outside of class.

When she was 23, she gained entry to the San Francisco Ballet. She went on to perform with the Metropolitan Opera Company and Balanchine's American Ballet Company. She also danced in Samuel Goldwyn's 1938 movie musical extravaganza, The Goldwyn Follies. She became a naturalized U.S. citizen in 1945.

Throughout her career, Ruiz continued dancing in nightclubs, performing flamenco throughout Spain and South America. Ruiz continued to dance well into her 70s, teaching ballroom and Spanish dance and offering movement classes to the elderly and the disabled.

== Personal life ==
In 1948, she met and married the photographer John Mailer; they divorced after five years. She never remarried, and is survived by their son, Michael Mailer.

She died from complications of pneumonia on New Year's Eve 2005 in Pinole, California, aged 95.
