= Fritz Kristoffersen =

Norwegian footballer (1917-2005)

Personal information
- Date of birth: 8 November 1917
- Date of death: 14 December 2005 (aged 88)

International career
Years	Team	Apps	(Gls)
1946	Norway	1	(0)

Fritz Kristoffersen (8 November 1917 – 14 December 2005) was a Norwegian footballer. He played in one match for the Norway national football team in 1946.
