= Dick Walls =

American basketball player (1931–2005)

Personal information
- Born: January 31, 1931 Fort Recovery, Ohio, U.S.
- Died: December 18, 2005 (aged 74) Akron, Ohio, U.S.
- Listed height: 6 ft 7 in (2.01 m)
- Listed weight: 250 lb (113 kg)

Career information
- College: Miami (Ohio) (1950–1953)
- NBA draft: 1953: 5th round, 44th overall pick
- Drafted by: Rochester Royals
- Position: Center

Career highlights
- 2× First-team All-MAC (1951, 1953); No. 44 retired by Miami RedHawks
- Stats at Basketball Reference

Richard Walls (January 31, 1931 – December 18, 2005) was an American basketball player, most noted for his play as a college player for the Miami RedHawks from 1950 to 1953, where his number is retired.

== College career ==
Walls was raised in Akron, Ohio and would sign to play college basketball at Miami University. After sitting out the required freshman year, the 6'7", 250 pound Walls made an immediate impact on the 1950-51 Miami team, leading the team in scoring (12.1 ppg) and rebounding (14.3 rpg). In his junior season, Walls again dominated, with 14.9 ppg and 13.3 rpg, leading Miami to their first Mid-American Conference championship, finishing the season 19-6 (9–3) and tied with Western Michigan for the conference title.

Walls would take his play to yet another level in his senior year, scoring 21.2 ppg with 14.5 rpg, leading Miami to an outright conference championship with a 17-6 (10–2) record. The team was one of 22 teams selected for the 1953 NCAA basketball tournament, the first in school history, and lost 74–72 to the Depaul Blue Demons in the opening round, as Miami failed to make up a 12-point halftime deficit at the Allen County War Memorial Coliseum in Fort Wayne, Indiana as Walls fouled out with 3 minutes remaining.

== Post college ==
After graduation, Walls was selected in the 5th round of the 1953 NBA Draft by the Rochester Royals, but Walls would play basketball for the Akron Goodyear Wingfoots of the National Industrial Basketball League, while working for the Goodyear Tire and Rubber Company. Walls would eventually retire from Goodyear after 35 years of service. Walls had his jersey number (44) retired by Miami in a 1995 ceremony, and passed away in 2005 in his hometown of Akron.
