= Herman Purcell =

American baseball player

- Pitcher
- Born: August 15, 1923; St. Louis, Missouri, U.S.
- Died: December 24, 2005 (aged 82); Grand Rapids, Michigan, U.S.
- Batted: Both Threw: Right

Negro league baseball debut
- 1947, for the Memphis Red Sox

Last appearance
- 1947, for the Memphis Red Sox

Teams
- Memphis Red Sox (1947)

Herman David Purcell (August 15, 1923 – December 24, 2005) was an American Negro league pitcher in the 1940s.

A native of St. Louis, Missouri, Purcell was signed by the Cleveland Buckeyes before the 1944 season. In 1947, he played for the Memphis Red Sox. He died in Grand Rapids, Michigan in 2005 at age 82.
