= Tokuji Wakasa =

Japanese businessman

Tokuji Wakasa (若狭 得治; March 11, 1914 – December 27, 2005) was a Japanese businessman, the former head of All Nippon Airways. He became President of the company in 1970, one year after becoming vice-president. In 1976, he was imprisoned as a result of a bribery scandal.

After serving time, he regained some honorary status with the company, but withdrew over a dispute with the new president, Seiji Fukatsu.

Wakasa died of pneumonia in 2005.
