= 1977 Origins Award winners =

List of winners of the 4th annual (1977) Origins Awards

The following are the winners of the 4th annual (1977) Origins Award, presented at Origins 1978:

== Charles Roberts Awards ==
Category	Winner	Company	Designer(s)
Best Strategic Game	Victory in the Pacific	The Avalon Hill Game Company	Richard Hamblen
Best Tactical Game	Squad Leader	The Avalon Hill Game Company	John Hill
Best Fantasy Board Game	War of the Ring	SPI	Richard Berg
Best Professional Magazine	Strategy & Tactics	SPI	
Best Amateur Magazine	The Space Gamer	Metagaming	

== The H.G. Wells Awards ==
Category	Winner	Company	Designer(s)
Best Historical Figure Series of 1977	Hinchliffe	Hinchliffe	
Best Fantasy Figure Series of 1977	Ral Partha	Ral Partha	
Best Vehicular Model Series of 1977	GHQ Microarmor	GHQ	
All Time Best Napoleonic Rules of 1977	Empire	Empire Games	
All Time Best Roleplaying Rules of 1977	Dungeons & Dragons	TSR, Inc.	
Best Professional Magazine Covering Miniatures or Roleplaying of 1977	The Dragon	TSR, Inc.	
Greatest Contribution to the Hobby 1967-77 of 1977	Dungeons & Dragons	TSR, Inc.	

== Adventure Gaming Hall of Fame Inductees ==
- Redmond Simonsen
- Dungeons & Dragons
- Empire
