= Dungeons & Dragons =

Fantasy role-playing game

- Logo used for Dungeons & Dragons 5th edition

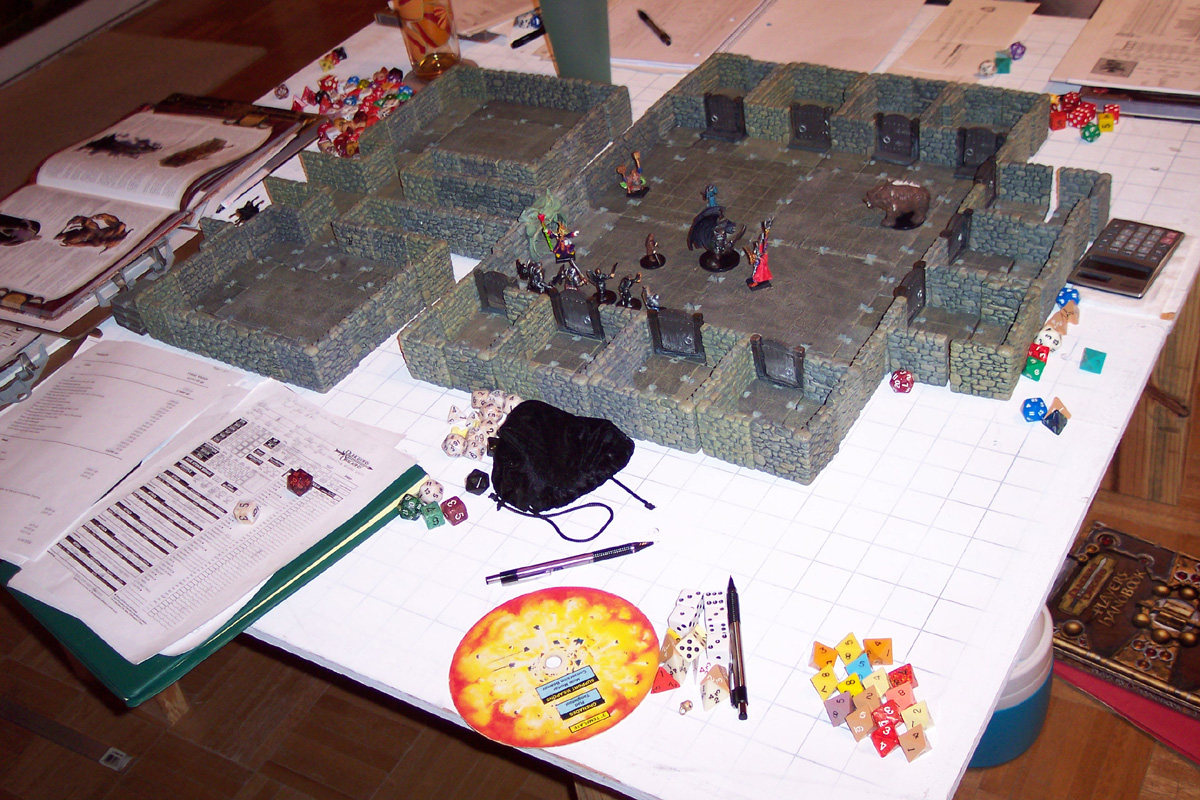
- An elaborate D&D game in progress. Among the gaming aids shown here are dice, a variety of miniatures, and a dungeon diorama.
- Designers: Gary Gygax; Dave Arneson
- Publishers: TSR (1974–1997); Wizards of the Coast (1997–present)
- Publication: 1974 (Original); 1977 (Basic Set 1st ver.); 1977 (Advanced D&D); 1981 (Basic Set 2nd ver.); 1983 (Basic Set 3rd ver.); 1989 (AD&D 2nd Edition); 1991 (Rules Cyclopedia); 2000 (3rd edition); 2003 (v3.5); 2008 (4th edition); 2014 (5th edition); 2024 (Revised 5th edition)
- Years active: 52 years (since 1974)
- Genres: Fantasy
- Systems: Dungeons & Dragons d20 System (3rd Edition)
- Playing time: Varies
- Chance: Dice rolling
- Skills: Role-playing, improvisation, tactics, arithmetic
- Website: www.dndbeyond.com

Dungeons & Dragons (commonly abbreviated as D&D or DnD) is a fantasy tabletop role-playing game (TTRPG) originally created and designed by Gary Gygax and Dave Arneson. The game was first published in 1974 by Tactical Studies Rules (TSR). It has been published by Wizards of the Coast, later a subsidiary of Hasbro, since 1997. The game was derived from miniature wargames, with a variation of the 1971 game Chainmail serving as the initial rule system. D&D's publication is commonly recognized as the beginning of modern role-playing games and the role-playing game industry, which also deeply influenced video games, especially the role-playing video game genre.

D&D departs from traditional wargaming by allowing each player to create their own character to play instead of a military formation. These characters embark upon adventures within a fantasy setting. A Dungeon Master (DM) serves as referee and storyteller for the game, while maintaining the setting in which the adventures occur, and playing the role of the inhabitants of the game world, known as non-player characters (NPCs). The characters form a party and they interact with the setting's inhabitants and each other. Together they solve problems, engage in battles, explore, and gather treasure and knowledge. In the process, player characters earn experience points (XP) to level up, and become increasingly powerful over a series of separate gaming sessions. Players choose a class when they create their character, which gives them special perks and abilities every few levels.

The early success of D&D led to a proliferation of similar game systems. Despite the competition, D&D has remained the market leader in the role-playing game industry. In 1977, the game was split into two branches: the relatively rules-light game system of basic Dungeons & Dragons, and the more structured, rules-heavy game system of Advanced Dungeons & Dragons (abbreviated as AD&D). AD&D 2nd Edition was published in 1989. In 2000, a new system was released as D&D 3rd edition, continuing the edition numbering from AD&D; a revised version 3.5 was released in June 2003. These 3rd edition rules formed the basis of the d20 System, which is available under the Open Game License (OGL) for use by other publishers. D&D 4th edition was released in June 2008. The 5th edition of D&D, the most recent, was released during the second half of 2014.

In 2004, D&D remained the best-known, and best-selling, role-playing game in the US, with an estimated 20 million people having played the game and more than US$1 billion in book and equipment sales worldwide. The year 2017 had "the most number of players in its history—12 million to 15 million in North America alone". D&D 5th edition sales "were up 41 percent in 2017 from the year before, and soared another 52 percent in 2018, the game's biggest sales year yet". The game has been supplemented by many premade adventures, as well as commercial campaign settings suitable for use by regular gaming groups. D&D is known beyond the game itself for other D&D-branded products, references in popular culture, and some of the controversies that have surrounded it, particularly a moral panic in the 1980s that attempted to associate it with Satanism and suicide. The game has won multiple awards and has been translated into many languages.

== Play overview ==
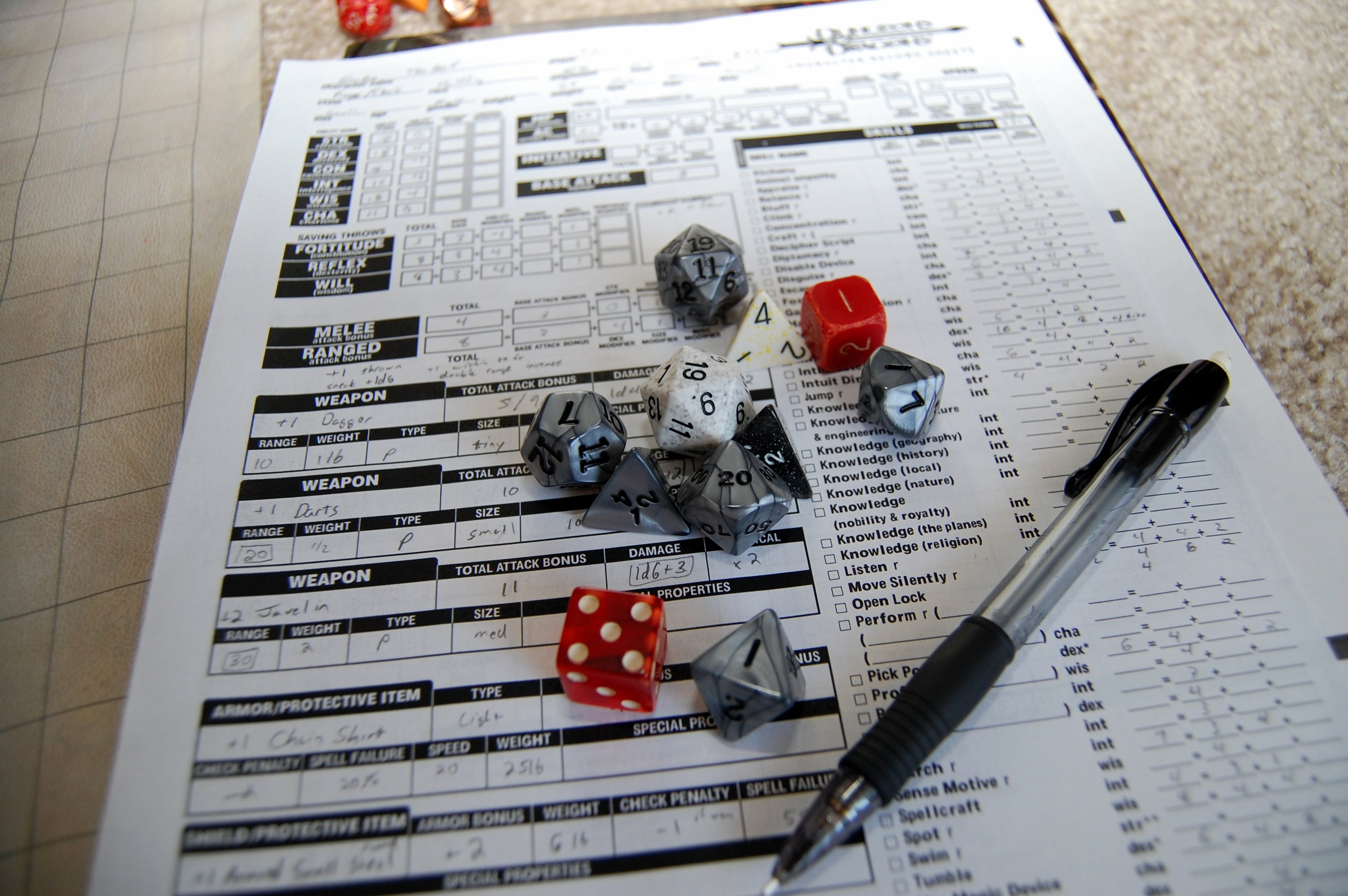
Players utilize both dice and character sheets during a game session.

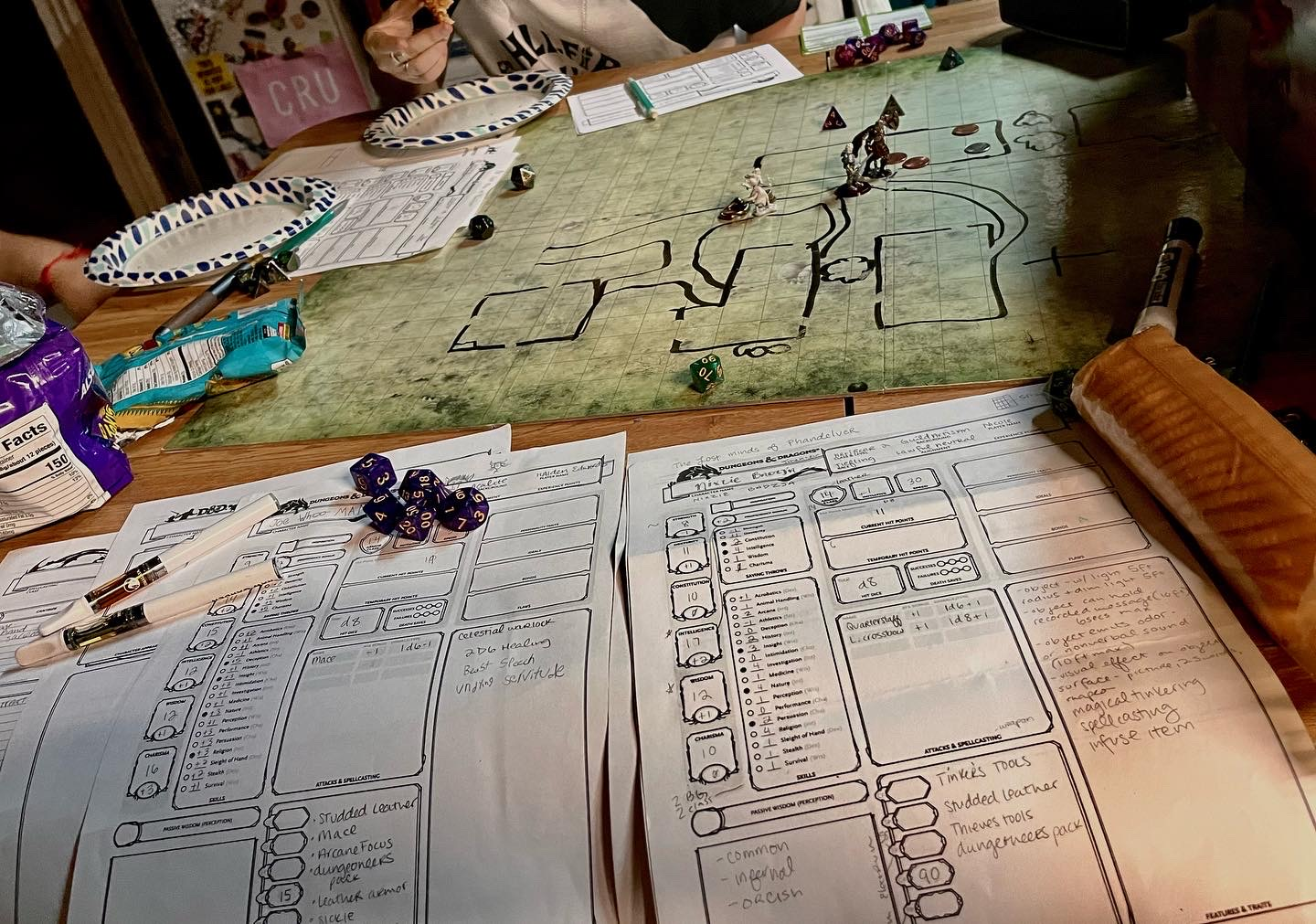
A Dungeons & Dragons game session featuring a map, miniatures, dice, and character sheets

Dungeons & Dragons is a structured yet open-ended role-playing game. Typically, one player takes on the role of Dungeon Master (DM) or Game Master (GM) while the others each control a single character, representing an individual in a fictional setting. When working together as a group, the player characters (PCs) are often described as a "party" of adventurers, with each member often having their own area of specialty that contributes to the success of the group as a whole. During the course of play, each player directs the actions of their character and their interactions with other characters in the game. This activity is performed through the verbal impersonation of the characters by the players, while employing a variety of social and other useful cognitive skills, such as logic, basic mathematics, and imagination. A game often continues over a series of meetings to complete a single adventure, and longer into a series of related gaming adventures, called a "campaign".

The results of the party's choices and the overall storyline for the game are determined by the DM according to the rules of the game and the DM's interpretation of those rules. The DM selects and describes the various non-player characters (NPCs) that the party encounters, the settings in which these interactions occur, and the outcomes of those encounters based on the players' choices and actions. Encounters often take the form of battles with "monsters" – a generic term used in D&D to describe potentially hostile beings such as animals, aberrant beings, or mythical creatures. In addition to jewels and gold coins, magic items form part of the treasure that the players often seek in a dungeon. Magic items are generally found in treasure hoards, or recovered from fallen opponents; sometimes, a powerful or important magic item is the object of a quest. The game's extensive rules – which cover diverse subjects such as social interactions, magic use, combat, and the effect of the environment on PCs – help the DM to make these decisions. The DM may choose to deviate from the published rules or make up new ones if they feel it is necessary.

The most recent versions of the game's rules are detailed in three core rulebooks: the Player's Handbook, the Dungeon Master's Guide and the Monster Manual. The only items required to play the game are the rulebooks, a character sheet for each player, and a number of polyhedral dice. Many players also use miniature figures on a grid map as a visual aid if desired, particularly during combat. Some editions of the game presume such usage. Many optional accessories are available to enhance the game, such as expansion rulebooks, pre-designed adventures, and various campaign settings.

=== Game mechanics ===
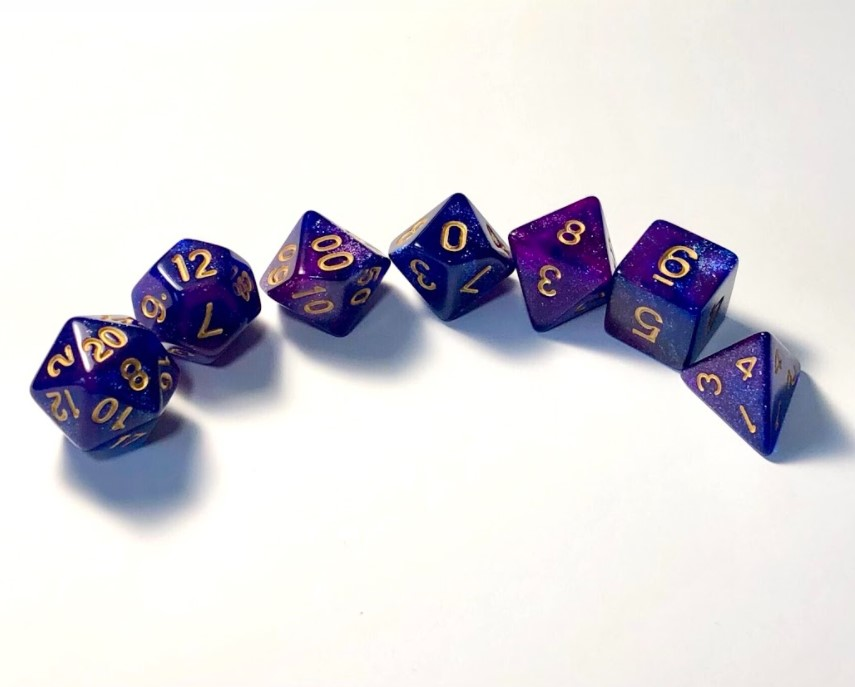
D&D uses polyhedral dice to resolve in-game events. These are abbreviated by a 'd' followed by the number of sides. Shown from left to right are a d20, d12, d%, d10, d8, d6, and a d4. A d% and d10 can be rolled together to produce a number between 1 and 100.

Before the game begins, each player creates their player character and records the details (described below) on a character sheet. First, a player determines their character's ability scores, which consist of Strength, Dexterity, Constitution, Intelligence, Wisdom, and Charisma. Each edition of the game has offered differing methods of determining these scores. The player then chooses a species, (Note: Prior to 2024, this was called race.) a character class, an alignment, and other features to round out the character's abilities and backstory, which have varied in nature through differing editions.

During the game, players describe their PCs' intended actions to the DM, who then describes the result or response. Trivial actions, such as picking up a letter or opening an unlocked door, are usually automatically successful. The outcomes of more complex or risky actions, such as scaling a cliff or picking a lock, are determined by rolling dice. Different polyhedral dice are used for different actions. For example, a twenty-sided die is used to determine whether a hit is made in combat, with other dice such as four, six, eight, ten, or even twelve-sided die used to determine how much damage was dealt. Factors contributing to the outcome include the character's ability scores, skills, and the difficulty of the task. In circumstances where a character is attempting to avoid a negative outcome, such as when dodging a trap or resisting the effect of a spell, a saving throw can be used to determine whether the resulting effect is reduced or avoided. In this case the odds of success are influenced by the character's class, levels and ability scores. In circumstances where a character is attempting to complete a task such as picking a lock, deactivating a trap, or pushing a boulder, a Difficulty Class must be hit or exceeded. Relevant ability bonuses are added to help players succeed.

As the game is played, each PC changes over time and generally increases in capability. Characters gain (or sometimes lose) experience, skills and wealth, and may even alter their alignment or gain additional character classes, which is called "Multiclassing". The key way characters progress is by earning experience points (XP), which happens when they defeat an enemy or accomplish a difficult task. Acquiring enough XP allows a PC to advance a level, which grants the character improved class features, abilities and skills. XP can be lost in some circumstances, such as encounters with creatures that drain life energy, or by use of certain magical powers that come with an XP cost.

Hit points (HP) are a measure of a character's vitality and health and are determined by the class, level and Constitution of each character. They can be temporarily lost when a character sustains wounds in combat or otherwise comes to harm, and loss of HP is the most common way for a character to die in the game. Death can also result from the loss of key ability scores or character levels. When a PC dies, it is often possible for the dead character to be resurrected through magic, although some penalties may be imposed as a result. If resurrection is not possible or not desired, the player may instead create a new PC to resume playing the game.

=== Adventures and campaigns ===
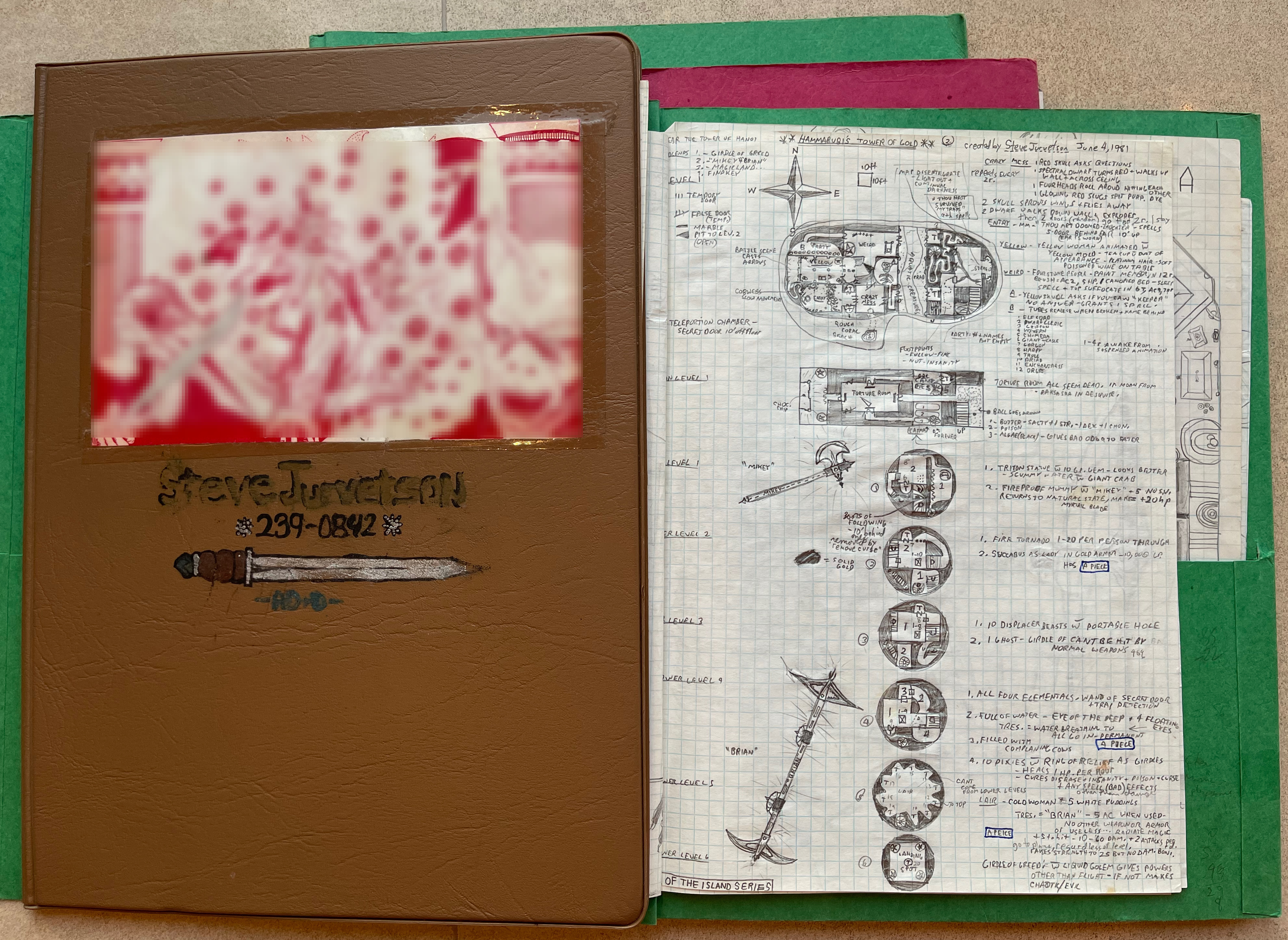
A Dungeon Master's notebook with a custom design adventure

A typical Dungeons & Dragons game consists of an "adventure", which is roughly equivalent to a single story or quest. The DM can either design an original adventure or follow one of the many premade adventures (also known as "modules") that have been published throughout the history of Dungeons & Dragons. Published adventures typically include a background story, illustrations, maps, and goals for players to achieve. Some may include location descriptions and handouts, although they are not required for gameplay. Although a small adventure entitled "Temple of the Frog" was included in the Blackmoor rules supplement in 1975, the first stand-alone D&D module published by TSR was 1978's Steading of the Hill Giant Chief, written by Gygax.

A linked series of adventures is commonly referred to as a "campaign". The locations where these adventures occur, such as a city, country, planet, or entire fictional universe, are referred to as "campaign settings" or "worlds." D&D settings are based in various fantasy genres and feature different levels and types of magic and technology. Popular commercially published campaign settings for Dungeons & Dragons include Greyhawk, Dragonlance, Forgotten Realms, Mystara, Spelljammer, Ravenloft, Dark Sun, Planescape, Birthright, and Eberron.

Alternatively, DMs may develop their own fictional worlds to use as campaign settings, either planning the adventure ahead or expanding on it as the players progress.

=== Miniature figures ===
Dungeons & Dragons miniature figures. The grid mat underneath uses one-inch squares, with the side length of each square usually representing either 5 or 10 feet (1.5 or 3.0 m).

The wargames from which Dungeons & Dragons evolved used miniature figures to represent combatants. D&D initially continued the use of miniatures in a fashion similar to its direct precursors. The original D&D set of 1974 required the use of the Chainmail miniatures game for combat resolution. By the publication of the 1977 game editions, combat was mostly resolved verbally. Thus, miniatures were no longer required for gameplay, although some players continued to use them as a visual reference.

In the 1970s, numerous companies began to sell miniature figures specifically for Dungeons & Dragons and similar games. Licensed miniature manufacturers who produced official figures include Grenadier Miniatures (1980–1983), Citadel Miniatures (1984–1986), Ral Partha, and TSR itself. Most of these miniatures used the 25 mm scale.

Periodically, Dungeons & Dragons has returned to its wargaming roots with supplementary rules systems for miniatures-based wargaming. Supplements such as Battlesystem (1985 and 1989) and a new edition of Chainmail (2001) provided rule systems to handle battles between armies by using miniatures.

== Sources and influences ==
An immediate predecessor of Dungeons & Dragons was a set of medieval miniature rules written by Jeff Perren. These were expanded by Gary Gygax, whose additions included a fantasy supplement, before the game was published as Chainmail. When Dave Wesely entered the Army in 1970, his friend and fellow Napoleonics wargamer Dave Arneson began a medieval variation of Wesely's Braunstein games, where players control individuals instead of armies. Arneson used Chainmail to resolve combat. As play progressed, Arneson added such innovations as character classes, experience points, level advancement, armor class, and others. Having partnered previously with Gygax on Don't Give Up the Ship!, Arneson introduced Gygax to his Blackmoor game and the two then collaborated on developing "The Fantasy Game", the game that became Dungeons & Dragons, with the final writing and preparation of the text being done by Gygax. The name was chosen by Gygax's two-year-old daughter Cindy; upon being presented with a number of choices of possible names, she exclaimed, "Oh Daddy, I like Dungeons & Dragons best!", although less prevalent versions of the story gave credit to his then wife Mary Jo.

Many Dungeons & Dragons elements appear in hobbies of the mid-to-late 20th century. For example, character-based role-playing can be seen in improvisational theater. Game-world simulations were well developed in wargaming. Fantasy milieux specifically designed for gaming could be seen in Glorantha's board games, among others. Ultimately, however, Dungeons & Dragons represents a unique blending of these elements.

The world of D&D was influenced by world mythology, history, pulp fiction, and contemporary fantasy novels, as listed by Gygax in the Appendix N of the original Dungeon Master's Guide. The importance of J. R. R. Tolkien's works The Lord of the Rings and The Hobbit as an influence on D&D is controversial. The presence in the game of halflings, elves, half-elves, dwarves, orcs, rangers, and the like, as well as the convention of diverse adventurers forming a group, draw comparisons to these works. The resemblance was even closer before the threat of copyright action from Tolkien Enterprises prompted the name changes of hobbit to 'halfling', ent to 'treant', and balrog to 'balor'. For many years, Gygax played down the influence of Tolkien on the development of the game. However, in an interview in 2000, he acknowledged that Tolkien's work had a "strong impact" though he also said that the list of other influential authors was long.

The D&D magic system, in which wizards memorize spells that are used up once cast and must be re-memorized the next day, was heavily influenced by the Dying Earth stories and novels of Jack Vance. The original alignment system (which grouped all characters and creatures into 'Law', 'Neutrality' and 'Chaos') was derived from the novel Three Hearts and Three Lions by Poul Anderson. A troll described in this work influenced the D&D definition of that monster. Writer and game designer Graeme Davis saw the Labyrinth of the Greek myth of the Minotaur as an inspiration for the game's use of dungeons as monster lairs.

Other influences include the works of Robert E. Howard, Edgar Rice Burroughs, A. Merritt, H. P. Lovecraft, Fritz Leiber, L. Sprague de Camp, Fletcher Pratt, Roger Zelazny, and Michael Moorcock. Monsters, spells, and magic items used in the game have been inspired by hundreds of individual works such as A. E. van Vogt's "Black Destroyer", Coeurl (the Displacer Beast), Lewis Carroll's "Jabberwocky" (vorpal sword) and the Book of Genesis (the clerical spell 'Blade Barrier' was inspired by the "flaming sword which turned every way" at the gates of Eden).

== Development history ==
Dungeons & Dragons has gone through several revisions. Parallel versions and inconsistent naming practices can make it difficult to distinguish between the different editions.

=== Original game ===
The original Dungeons & Dragons, now referred to as OD&D, is a small box set of three booklets published in 1974. With a very limited production budget of only $2000—with only $100 budgeted for artwork—it is amateurish in production and assumes the player is familiar with wargaming. Nevertheless, it grew rapidly in popularity, first among wargamers and then expanding to a more general audience of college and high school students. Roughly 1,000 copies of the game were sold in the first year, followed by 3,000 in 1975, and many more in the following years. This first set went through many printings and was supplemented with several official additions, such as the original Greyhawk and Blackmoor supplements (both 1975), as well as magazine articles in TSR's official publications and many fanzines.

==== Two-pronged strategy ====
In early 1977, TSR created the first element of a two-pronged strategy that would divide D&D for nearly two decades. A Dungeons & Dragons Basic Set boxed edition was introduced that cleaned up the presentation of the essential rules, makes the system understandable to the general public, and was sold in a package that could be stocked in toy stores. Later in 1977, the first part of Advanced Dungeons & Dragons (AD&D) was published, which brought together the various published rules, options and corrections, then expanded them into a definitive, unified game for hobbyist gamers. TSR marketed them as an introductory game for new players and a more complex game for experienced ones; the Basic Set directed players who exhausted the possibilities of that game to switch to the advanced rules.

As a result of this parallel development, the basic game includes many rules and concepts which contradicted comparable ones in AD&D. John Eric Holmes, the editor of the basic game, preferred a lighter tone with more room for personal improvisation. AD&D, on the other hand, was designed to create a tighter, more structured game system than the loose framework of the original game. Between 1977 and 1979, three hardcover rulebooks, commonly referred to as the "core rulebooks", were released: the Player's Handbook (PHB), the Dungeon Master's Guide (DMG), and the Monster Manual (MM). Several supplementary books were published throughout the 1980s, notably Unearthed Arcana (1985), which included a large number of new rules. Confusing matters further, the original D&D boxed set remained in publication until 1979, since it remained a healthy seller for TSR.

=== Revised editions ===
In the 1980s, the rules for Advanced Dungeons & Dragons and "basic" Dungeons & Dragons remained separate, each developing along different paths. In 1981, the basic version of Dungeons & Dragons was revised by Tom Moldvay to make it even more novice-friendly. It was promoted as a continuation of the original D&D tone, whereas AD&D was promoted as an advancement of the mechanics. An accompanying Expert Set, originally written by David "Zeb" Cook, allows players to continue using the simpler ruleset beyond the early levels of play. In 1983, revisions of those sets by Frank Mentzer were released, revising the presentation of the rules to a more tutorial format. These were followed by Companion (1983), Master (1985), and Immortals (1986) sets. Each set covers game play for more powerful characters than the previous. The first four sets were compiled in 1991 as a single hardcover book, the Dungeons & Dragons Rules Cyclopedia, which was released alongside a new introductory boxed set.

Advanced Dungeons & Dragons 2nd Edition was published in 1989, again as three core rulebooks; the primary designer was David "Zeb" Cook. The Monster Manual was replaced by the Monstrous Compendium, a loose-leaf binder that was subsequently replaced by the hardcover Monstrous Manual in 1993. In 1995, the core rulebooks were slightly revised, although still referred to by TSR as the 2nd Edition, and a series of Player's Option manuals were released as optional rulebooks.

The release of AD&D 2nd Edition deliberately excluded some aspects of the game that had attracted negative publicity. References to demons and devils, sexually suggestive artwork, and playable, evil-aligned character types – such as assassins and half-orcs – were removed. The edition moved away from a theme of 1960s and 1970s "sword and sorcery" fantasy fiction to a mixture of medieval history and mythology. The rules underwent minor changes, including the addition of non-weapon proficiencies – skill-like abilities that appear in first edition supplements. The game's magic spells are divided into schools and spheres. A major difference was the promotion of various game settings beyond that of traditional fantasy. This included blending fantasy with other genres, such as horror (Ravenloft), science fiction (Spelljammer), and apocalyptic (Dark Sun), as well as alternative historical and non-European mythological settings.

=== Wizards of the Coast ===
In 1997, a near-bankrupt TSR was purchased by Wizards of the Coast. Following three years of development, Dungeons & Dragons 3rd edition was released in 2000. The new release folded the Basic and Advanced lines back into a single unified game. It was the largest revision of the D&D rules to date and served as the basis for a multi-genre role-playing system designed around 20-sided dice, called the d20 System. The 3rd Edition rules were designed to be internally consistent and less restrictive than previous editions of the game, allowing players more flexibility to create the characters they wanted to play. Skills and feats were introduced into the core rules to encourage further customization of characters. The new rules standardized the mechanics of action resolution and combat. In 2003, Dungeons & Dragons v.3.5 was released as a revision of the 3rd Edition rules. This release incorporated hundreds of rule changes, mostly minor, and expanded the core rulebooks.

In early 2005, Wizards of the Coast's R&D team started to develop Dungeons & Dragons 4th Edition, prompted mainly by the feedback obtained from the D&D playing community and a desire to make the game faster, more intuitive, and with a better play experience than under the 3rd Edition. The new game was developed through a number of design phases spanning from May 2005 until its release. Dungeons & Dragons 4th Edition was announced at Gen Con in August 2007, and the initial three core books were released June 6, 2008. 4th Edition streamlined the game into a simplified form and introduced numerous rules changes. Many character abilities were restructured into "Powers". These altered the spell-using classes by adding abilities that could be used at will, per encounter, or per day. Likewise, non-magic-using classes were provided with parallel sets of options. Software tools, including player character and monster-building programs, became a major part of the game. This edition added the D&D Encounters program; a weekly event held at local stores designed to draw players back to the game by giving "the busy gamer the chance to play D&D once a week as their schedules allow. In the past, D&D games could take months, even years, and players generally had to attend every session so that the story flow wasn't interrupted. With Encounters, players can come and go as they choose and new players can easily be integrated into the story continuity".

=== 5th Edition ===
On January 9, 2012, Wizards of the Coast announced that it was working on a 5th edition of the game. The company planned to take suggestions from players and let them playtest the rules. Public playtesting began on May 24, 2012. At Gen Con 2012 in August, Mike Mearls, co-lead developer for 5th Edition, said that Wizards of the Coast had received feedback from more than 75,000 playtesters, but that the entire development process would take two years, adding, "I can't emphasize this enough ... we're very serious about taking the time we need to get this right." The release of the 5th Edition, coinciding with D&D's 40th anniversary, occurred in the second half of 2014.

Since the release of 5th edition, dozens of Dungeons & Dragons books have been published including new rulebooks, campaign guides and adventure modules. 2017 had "the most number of players in its history—12 million to 15 million in North America alone". Mary Pilon, for Bloomberg, reported that sales of 5th edition Dungeon & Dragons "were up 41 percent in 2017 from the year before, and soared another 52 percent in 2018, the game's biggest sales year yet. [...] In 2017, 9 million people watched others play D&D on Twitch, immersing themselves in the world of the game without ever having to pick up a die or cast a spell". In 2018, Wizards of the Coast organized a massive live-stream event, the Stream of Many Eyes, where ten live-streamed sessions of Dungeons & Dragons were performed on Twitch over three days. This event won the Content Marketing Institute's 2019 award for best "In-Person (Event) Content Marketing Strategy". Dungeons & Dragons continued to have a strong presence on Twitch throughout 2019; this included a growing number of celebrity players and dungeon masters, such as Joe Manganiello, Deborah Ann Woll and Stephen Colbert. Wizards of the Coast has created, produced and sponsored multiple web series featuring Dungeons & Dragons. These shows have typically aired on the official Dungeons & Dragons Twitch and YouTube channels.

In 2020, Wizards of the Coast announced that Dungeons & Dragons had its 6th annual year of growth in 2019 with a "300 percent increase in sales of their introductory box sets, as well as a 65% increase on sales in Europe, a rate which has more than quadrupled since 2014". In terms of player demographics in 2019, 39% of identified as female and 61% identified as male. 40% of players are considered Gen Z (24 years old or younger), 34% of players are in the age range of 25–34 and 26% of players are aged 35+. In January 2021, the Los Angeles Times reported that according to Liz Schuh, head of publishing and licensing for Dungeons & Dragons, "revenue was up 35% in 2020 compared with 2019, the seventh consecutive year of growth," and in 2020, during the COVID-19 pandemic, "virtual play rose 86% [...] aided by online platforms such as Roll20 and Fantasy Grounds". Sarah Parvini, for the Los Angeles Times, wrote, "players and scholars attribute the game's resurgent popularity not only to the longueurs of the pandemic, but also to its reemergence in pop culture—on the Netflix series Stranger Things, whose main characters play D&D in a basement; on the sitcom The Big Bang Theory; or via the host of celebrities who display their love for the game online".

Following an apology issued by Wizards of the Coast for offensive and racist material included in Spelljammer: Adventures in Space and the announced revisions to the product in September 2022, Chris Perkins – Wizards' game design architect – announced a new inclusion review process with outside cultural consultants for the Dungeons & Dragons studio in November 2022. The previous process only included cultural consultants at the discretion of the product lead for a project. All products being reprinted will also go through this new review process and be updated as needed. Academic Emily Friedman, writing for Los Angeles Review of Books in 2023, noted that "by 2022, Wizards had withdrawn financial support from the last official streaming shows", including "the long-running Rivals of Waterdeep [(2018–22)] and The Black Dice Society (2021–22)", shifting instead to occasional funding for miniseries and standalone "one shot" episodes.

=== 2024 revision and digital expansion ===
In September 2021, it was announced that a backwards-compatible "evolution" of 5th edition would be released in 2024 to mark the 50th anniversary of the game. In August 2022, Wizards announced that the next phase of major changes for Dungeons & Dragons would occur under the One D&D initiative which includes a public playtest of the next version of Dungeons & Dragons and an upcoming virtual tabletop (VTT) simulator with 3D environments developed using Unreal Engine. Revised editions of the Player's Handbook, Monster Manual, and Dungeon Master's Guide were scheduled to be released in 2024; the revised Player's Handbook and Dungeon Master's Guide were released in 2024, with the Monster Manual released in February 2025.

In April 2022, Hasbro announced that Wizards would acquire the D&D Beyond digital toolset and game companion from Fandom; the official transfer to Wizards occurred in May 2022. At the Hasbro Investor Event in October 2022, it was announced that Dan Rawson, former COO of Microsoft Dynamics 365, was appointed to the newly created position of Senior Vice President for the Dungeons & Dragons brand; Rawson will act as the new head of the franchise. Chase Carter of Dicebreaker highlighted that Rawson's role is "part of Wizards' plans to apply more resources to the digital side of D&D" following the purchase of D&D Beyond by Hasbro earlier in the year. Wizards of the Coast CEO Cynthia Williams and Hasbro CEO Chris Cocks, at a December 2022 Hasbro investor-focused web seminar, called the Dungeons & Dragons brand "under monetized". They highlighted the high engagement of fans with the brand, however, the majority of spending is by Dungeon Masters who are only roughly 20% of the player base. Williams commented that the increased investment in digital will "unlock the type of recurrent spending you see in digital games".

At the July 2024 Hasbro investor meeting, Cocks stated "that digital revenue on D&D Beyond 'accounts for over half' of" the total earnings from Dungeons & Dragons. Carter, now for Rascal, commented that "we know physical books sell poorly, and even if pre-orders for the 2024 core books are, uh, 'solid', according to the CEO, it's evident that Hasbro holds little faith in analog games clotting the money bleed elsewhere in the company's structure". The 3D VTT Sigil launched as part of D&D Beyond in March 2025. Later that month, approximately 90% of the development team were laid off; in an internal communication, Hasbro Direct senior vice president Dan Rawson stated "our aspirations for Sigil as a large, standalone game with a distinct monetization path will not be realized". Sigil was shutdown in October 2025.

==== 5.5 Edition ====
Following the release of core rulebooks for the 2024 revision, Dungeons & Dragons Creative Director Chris Perkins and Game Director Jeremy Crawford announced their departures from Wizards of the Coast. Christian Hoffer, for Screen Rant, highlighted that both "have been part of the Dungeons & Dragons design team for decades and were two of the lead designers of" Dungeons & Dragons 5th Edition. On this change in game's leadership, he noted that VP of Franchise and Product (Dungeons & Dragons) Jess Lanzillo "mentioned that James Wyatt and Wes Schneider, principal designers who have been part of the D&D team for years, will both have a 'bigger place at the table'" and "other designers, including Justice Arman, would also have progressive leadership roles as well". In June 2025, Perkins and Crawford announced that they had joined Critical Role Productions' tabletop game imprint Darrington Press. Lin Codega of Rascal noted "over the last two years, the tabletop titan has lost much of its veteran talent pool" and this now includes the departures of Lanzillo and senior content marketing strategist Todd Kenreck.

In March 2026, D&D Beyond began to refer to 2024 revision content as 5.5e to reflect the nomenclature of the fan community. Also in March 2026, Wizards of the Coast announced a new seasonal content format for Dungeons & Dragons; sourcebooks and other associated accessory products will correspond with the season's theme. The first season, Season of Horror, was scheduled to run from April 2026 to June 2026. In April 2026, Wizards of the Coast launched a new actual play titled Dungeon Masters to showcase upcoming D&D content. Following the show's announcement, Polygon noted it has "been years since D&D had an ongoing, official actual play, produced and managed by" Wizards of the Coast. At Gen Con 2026, Wizards of the Coast announced the official return of multiple settings – in 2027, Dark Sun will be featured in the Season of Survival and Greyhawk will be featured in the Season of Sword & Sorcery. Other settings will receive official expansions by licensed partners. Wizards of the Coast also announced the D&D Icons line with Joe Manganiello as chief creative officer; the line will feature a new setting by Manganiello as well as other work by creators such as Luke Gygax, Margaret Weis, Tracy Hickman, and R.A. Salvatore.

== Licensing ==
Early in the game's history, TSR took no action against small publishers' production of D&D-compatible material and even licensed Judges Guild to produce D&D materials for several years, such as City State of the Invincible Overlord. This attitude changed in the mid-1980s when TSR took legal action to try to prevent others from publishing compatible material. This angered many fans and led to resentment by the other gaming companies. Although TSR took legal action against several publishers in an attempt to restrict third-party usage, it never brought any court cases to completion, instead settling out of court in every instance. TSR itself ran afoul of intellectual property law in several cases.

=== Open Game License, other licenses and Creative Commons ===
With the launch of Dungeons & Dragons's 3rd Edition, Wizards of the Coast made the d20 System available under the Open Game License (OGL) and d20 System trademark license. Under these licenses, authors were free to use the d20 System when writing games and game supplements. The OGL has allowed a wide range of unofficial commercial derivative work based on the mechanics of Dungeons and Dragons to be produced since 2000; it is credited with increasing the market share of d20 products and leading to a "boom in the RPG industry in the early 2000s". During the 2000s and 2010s, there was also a trend towards reviving and recreating older editions of D&D, known as the Old School Revival. This, in turn, inspired the creation of "retro-clones", games that more closely recreate the original rule sets, using material placed under the OGL along with non-copyrightable mechanical aspects of the older rules to create a new presentation of the games.

Wizards of the Coast also licensed out various settings to official partners. In 2000, The Kingdoms of Kalamar by Kenzer & Company became an official setting for 3rd Edition; they held the license until 2007. White Wolf Publishing's Arthaus division licensed Gamma World in 2001 and Ravenloft in 2002; both licenses ended in 2005. Also in 2002, Margaret Weis and Don Perrin's Sovereign Press created the Dragonlance Campaign Setting (2003) for Wizards of the Coast; they subsequently licensed the Dragonlance setting for further development until 2007. Shannon Appelcline, in the book Designers & Dragons (2014), wrote that by 2007 "Wizards seemed to be calling all licenses home" which lead to speculation that a new edition of Dungeons & Dragons was in development.

With the release of the 4th Edition in 2008, Wizards of the Coast introduced its Game System License, which represented a significant restriction compared to the very open policies embodied by the OGL. In part as a response to this, some publishers (such as Paizo Publishing with its Pathfinder Roleplaying Game) who previously produced materials in support of the D&D product line, decided to continue supporting the 3rd Edition rules, thereby competing directly with Wizards of the Coast. Others, such as Kenzer & Company, returned to the practice of publishing unlicensed supplements and arguing that copyright law does not allow Wizards of the Coast to restrict third-party usage. Appelcline commented that the "d20 community had been badly damaged following the d20 crash of 2003" and "Wizards so badly mishandled both the construction and the release of their new license that they all but killed it", noting that "by 2010, there were probably more books being produced under Paizo's Pathfinder license than under Wizards of the Coast's GSL license".

The 2014 release of 5th Edition featured official sourcebooks designed with other publishers: the Tyranny of Dragons (2014) books were by Kobold Press, Princes of the Apocalypse (2015) by Sasquatch Game Studios, and both Out of the Abyss (2015) and Sword Coast Adventurer's Guide (2015) by Green Ronin Publishing. At Gen Con 2026, Wizards of the Coast announced licensed partners to officially expand D&D settings with new sourcebooks – Ghostfire Gaming will develop Ravenloft, Visionary Productions and Design will develop Eberron, and Kobold Press will develop the Forgotten Realms.

Version 5.2 of the System Reference Document, released in 2025

Alongside the publication of the 5th Edition, Wizards of the Coast established a two-pronged licensing approach. The core of the 5th Edition rules were made available under the OGL; publishers and independent creators could also create licensed materials using Dungeons & Dragons IP under a program called the DM's Guild. The DM's Guild does not function under the OGL and uses a different community agreement.

Between November and December 2022, there was reported speculation that Wizards was planning on discontinuing the OGL for Dungeons & Dragons based on unconfirmed leaks. In response, Wizards stated it would continue to support "third-party D&D content with the release of One D&D in 2024." Limited details on the update to the OGL, including the addition of revenue reporting and required royalties, were then released by Wizards in December 2022. Linda Codega, for Io9 in January 2023, reported on the details from a leaked full copy of the OGL 1.1 including updated terms such as no longer authorizing use of the OGL1.0. Codega highlighted that "if the original license is in fact no longer viable, every single licensed publisher will be affected by the new agreement", noting this leaked draft indicates Wizards "is keeping power close at hand". A week after the leak, Wizards issued a response which walked back several changes to the OGL. The Motley Fool highlighted that "Hasbro pulled an abrupt volte-face and had its subsidiary D&D Beyond publish a mea culpa on its website". On January 27, 2023, following feedback received during the open comment period for the draft OGL1.2, Wizards of the Coast announced that the System Reference Document 5.1 (SRD 5.1) would be released under an irrevocable Creative Commons license (CC BY 4.0) effective immediately and Wizards would no longer pursue deauthorizing the OGL1.0a. The SRD was then revised to reflect the 2024 revision to the 5th Edition ruleset; System Reference Document 5.2 (SRD 5.2) was released under a Creative Commons license on April 22, 2025.

=== Other intellectual properties ===
In the early 2000s, Wizards of the Coast had the license to create a Star Wars tabletop roleplaying game; the Star Wars Roleplaying Game, first published in 2000, used their d20 System. Shannon Appelcline explained that this game used "all of the core systems of D&D" and added both "extensive Force rules and rules for spaceships, vehicles, and other technology". Appelcline noted this game was "well-supported through 2004". From 2007 to 2010, the game was updated with the Saga Edition. This iteration influenced the development of 4th Edition Dungeons & Dragons as the design teams shared ideas. Appelcline wrote that many 4th Edition mechanics debuted in the Star Wars game, such as "more powerful first-level characters, simplified skills, simplified saving throws" as well as "the first iterations of systems for 'bloodied' status, healing surges, and even encounter power".

Wizards of the Coast then released 5th Edition products that tie into other intellectual properties—such as Magic: The Gathering with the Guildmasters' Guide to Ravnica (2018) and Mythic Odysseys of Theros (2020) source books. Two 5th Edition starter box sets based on TV shows, Stranger Things and Rick and Morty, were released in 2019. Sourcebooks based on Dungeons & Dragons actual play series have also been released through official partnerships: Acquisitions Incorporated (2019), Explorer's Guide to Wildemount (2020), and Critical Role: Call of the Netherdeep (2022).

==== Universes Beyond ====
At Gen Con 2026, Wizards of the Coast announced a new Universes Beyond program for licensed partnerships. This program is similar to Wizards of the Coast's Universes Beyond program for Magic: The Gathering. Head of D&D Dan Ayoub described Universes Beyond as an "additive" product line and "another way for people to experience" D&D. Ayoub stated that they are not planning to decrease the core D&D line and aim to have a "balance" between the product lines. William Hughes of The A.V. Club highlighted Hasbro's success with "its Universes Beyond branding in Magic: The Gathering", opining that this new program is "a shiny, expensive way to shove a lot of recognizable names and characters into the D&D ecosystem, allowing the company to charge extensively for lightly rewritten content predicated on the promise of getting to play as your favorite Night Elf or Nightsister in the world's most popular RPG system".

These Universes Beyond releases will be part of the new seasonal structure for 5.5 Edition – the Season of Champions will be headlined by the upcoming Dungeons & Dragons: World of Warcraft (2026) sourcebook, based on the massively multiplayer online role-playing (MMORPG) video game World of Warcraft; the Season of Rebellion will feature a Star Wars themed sourcebook in 2027. Hughes also noted that both of these properties have previously received multiple tabletop roleplaying game adaptions.

== Reception ==
Eric Goldberg reviewed Dungeons & Dragons in Ares Magazine #1 (March 1980), rating it a 6 out of 9, and commented that "Dungeons and Dragons is an impressive achievement based on the concept alone, and also must be credited with cementing the marriage between the fantasy genre and gaming." Goldberg again reviewed Dungeons & Dragons in Ares Magazine #3 and commented that "D&D is the FRP game played most often in most places." In the 1980 book The Complete Book of Wargames, game designer Jon Freeman asked, "What can be said about a phenomenon? Aside from Tactics II and possibly PanzerBlitz (the first modern tactical wargame), this is the most significant war game since H. G. Wells." However, Freeman did have significant issues with the game, pointing out, "On the other hand, beginning characters are without exception dull, virtually powerless, and so fragile" which was not encouraging for "newcomers." He also called the magic system "stupid" feeling that many of the spells were "redundant" and "the effects of the majority are hopelessly vague." He found essential elements such as saving throws, hit points, and experience points "undefined or poorly explained; the ratio of substance to "holes" compares unfavorably with the head of a tennis racquet." He also noted the rules were "presented in the most illiterate display of poor grammar, misspellings, and typographical errors in professional wargaming." Despite all these issues, Freeman concluded, "As it was given birth, it is fascinating but misshapen; in its best incarnations, it's perhaps the most exciting and attractive specimen alive."

The game had over three million players worldwide by 1981, and copies of the rules were selling at a rate of about 750,000 per year by 1984. Beginning with a French language edition in 1982, Dungeons & Dragons has been translated into many languages beyond the original English. By 1992, the game had been translated into 14 languages and sold over 2 million copies in 44 countries worldwide. By 2004, consumers had spent more than $1 billion on Dungeons & Dragons products and the game had been played by more than 20 million people. As many as six million people played the game in 2007. David M. Ewalt, in his book Of Dice and Men (2013), praised that the game allows for a personal fantastical experience and stated that "even though it's make-believe, the catharsis is real."

=== Acclaim ===
The various editions of Dungeons & Dragons have won many Origins Awards, including All Time Best Roleplaying Rules of 1977, Best Roleplaying Rules of 1989, Best Roleplaying Game of 2000 and Best Role Playing Game and Best Role Playing Supplement of 2014 for the flagship editions of the game. Both Dungeons & Dragons and Advanced Dungeons & Dragons are Origins Hall of Fame Games inductees as they were deemed sufficiently distinct to merit separate inclusion on different occasions. The independent Games magazine placed Dungeons & Dragons on their Games 100 list from 1980 through 1983, then entered the game into the magazine's Hall of Fame in 1984. Games magazine included Dungeons & Dragons in their "Top 100 Games of 1980", saying "The more players, the merrier." Advanced Dungeons & Dragons was ranked 2nd in the 1996 reader poll of Arcane magazine to determine the 50 most popular roleplaying games of all time. Dungeons & Dragons was inducted into the National Toy Hall of Fame in 2016 and into the Science Fiction and Fantasy Hall of Fame in 2017.

=== Later editions ===
Later editions would lead to inevitable comparisons between the game series. Scott Taylor for Black Gate in 2013 rated Dungeons & Dragons as #1 in the top ten role-playing games of all time, saying "The grand-daddy of all games, D&D just keeps on going, and although there might always be 'edition wars' between players, that just says that it effectively stays within the consciousness of multiple generations of players as a relevant piece of entertainment."

Griffin McElroy, for Polygon in 2014, wrote: "The game has shifted in the past four decades, bouncing between different rules sets, philosophies and methods of play. Role-playing, character customization and real-life improvisational storytelling has always been at the game's core, but how those ideas are interpreted by the game system has changed drastically edition-to-edition". Dieter Bohn, for The Verge in 2014, wrote: "Every few years there's been a new version of D&D that tries to address the shortcomings of the previous version and also make itself more palatable to its age. [...] The third edition got a reputation (which it didn't necessarily deserve) for being too complex and rules-focused. The fourth edition got a reputation (which it didn't necessarily deserve) for being too focused on miniatures and grids, too mechanical. Meanwhile, the company that owns D&D had released a bunch of its old material for free as a service to fans, and some of that was built up into a competing game called Pathfinder. Pathfinder ultimately became more popular, by some metrics, than D&D itself". Bohn highlighted that the 5th Edition was "designed for one purpose: to bring D&D back to its roots and win back everybody who left during the edition wars".

Henry Glasheen, for SLUG Magazine in 2015, highlighted that after jumping ship during the 4th Edition era he was drawn back to Dungeons & Dragons with 5th Edition and he considers it "the new gold standard for D20-based tabletop RPGs". Glasheen wrote "Fifth Edition is a compelling reason to get excited about D&D again" and "while some will welcome the simplicity, I fully expect that plenty of people will stick to whatever system suits them best. However, this edition is easily my favorite, ranking even higher than D&D 3.5, my first love in D&D".

Christian Hoffer, for ComicBook.com in 2022, highlighted the continuing fan debate on Dungeons & Dragons and Pathfinder's current editions which centers on Dungeons & Dragons 5th Edition's market dominance. Hoffer wrote, "The reality is that Dungeons & Dragons Fifth Edition is likely the most popular tabletop roleplaying game ever made, even more so than previous editions of the games. 5E has brought millions of new players to tabletop roleplaying games. Many of those newer players have never heard of other roleplaying games, even popular ones like Vampire: The Masquerade or Cyberpunk or Pathfinder. [...] Many content creators and publishers see 5E as their main path to survival and relevance even if it's not their preferred gaming system".

In December 2023, James Whitbrook of Gizmodo highlighted "D&D's continued social influence" with the release of related media such as the film Honor Among Thieves, the Dungeons & Dragons: Adventures FAST channel, and the video game Baldur's Gate 3 with the video game's "blockbuster success" credited "for a 40% increase in Wizards of the Coast's earnings over 2022". However, Whitbrook opined that not even these successes "could save Dungeons & Dragons from the greed of its owners" with the OGL controversy and major layoffs by Hasbro bookending "what should've been one of the greatest years for Dungeons & Dragons the game has ever seen—more popular than ever, more accessible than ever, more culturally relevant than ever—and in doing so transformed it into a golden era sullied with dark marks, overshadowed by grim caveats, a reflection that those with the most power in these spaces never really take the lessons they espoused to learn from their mistakes".

In 2025, Harvey Randall of PC Gamer said that he had "little confidence" in Hasbro and its leadership knowing "what to do with any of its [Dungeons & Dragons] victories". On the 5th Edition rules revision, Randall commented, "the fact that WoTC didn't feel confident enough to reinvent much of anything after 10 years signals how paralyzed the entire operation has become [...]. After a decade of successes, and after a massive, hobby-wide controversy seemingly couldn't sink it, D&D's next big move was to equip you with basically the same game for the next 10 years. No innovation, no progression, just a slightly different angle to the wheels spinning in the dirt".

=== Moral panic ===
At various times in its history, Dungeons & Dragons has received negative publicity, in particular from some Christian groups, for alleged promotion of such practices as devil worship, witchcraft, suicide, and murder, and for the presence of naked breasts in drawings of female humanoids in the original AD&D manuals (mainly monsters such as harpies, succubi, etc.). These controversies led TSR to remove many potentially controversial references and artwork when releasing the 2nd Edition of AD&D. Many of these references, including the use of the names "devils" and "demons", were reintroduced in the 3rd edition. The moral panic over the game led to problems for fans of D&D who faced social ostracism, unfair treatment, and false association with the occult and Satanism, regardless of an individual fan's actual religious affiliation and beliefs. However, the controversy was also beneficial in evoking the Streisand Effect by giving the game widespread notoriety that significantly increased sales in the early 1980s in defiance of the moral panic.

Dungeons & Dragons has been the subject of rumors regarding players having difficulty separating fantasy from reality, even leading to psychotic episodes. The most notable of these was the saga of James Dallas Egbert III, the facts of which were fictionalized in the novel Mazes and Monsters and later made into a TV movie in 1982 starring Tom Hanks. William Dear, the private investigator hired by the Egbert family to find their son when he went missing at college, wrote a book titled The Dungeon Master (1984) refuting any connection with D&D and Egbert's personal issues. The game was blamed for some of the actions of Chris Pritchard, who was convicted in 1990 of murdering his stepfather. Research by various psychologists, starting with Armando Simon, has concluded that no harmful effects are related to the playing of D&D. Dungeons & Dragons has also been cited as encouraging people to socialize weekly or biweekly, teaching problem solving skills, which can be beneficial in adult life, and teaching positive moral decisions.

=== Later criticism ===
D&D has been compared unfavorably to other role-playing games of its time. Writing for Slate in 2008, Erik Sofge makes unfavorable comparisons between the violent incentives of D&D and the more versatile role-playing experience of GURPS. He claims that "for decades, gamers have argued that since D&D came first, its lame, morally repulsive experience system can be forgiven. But the damage is still being done: New generations of players are introduced to RPGs as little more than a collective fantasy of massacre." This criticism generated backlash from D&D fans. Writing for Ars Technica, Ben Kuchera responded that Sofge had experienced a "small-minded Dungeon Master who only wanted to kill things", and that better game experiences are possible.

In 2020, Polygon reported that "the D&D team announced that it would be making changes to portions of its 5th edition product line that fans have called out for being insensitive". Sebastian Modak, for The Washington Post, reported that the tabletop community has widely approved these changes. Modak wrote that "in its statement addressing mistakes around portrayals of different peoples in the D&D universe, Wizards of the Coast highlighted its recent efforts in bringing in more diverse voices to craft the new D&D sourcebooks coming out in 2021. [...] These conversations—around depictions of race and alleged treatment of employees of marginalized backgrounds and identities—have encouraged players to seek out other tabletop roleplaying experiences". Matthew Gault, for Wired, reported positively on the roundtable discussions Wizards of the Coast has hosted with fans and community leaders on diversity and inclusion. However, Gault also highlighted that other efforts, such as revisions to old material and the release of new material, have been less great and at times minimal. Gault wrote, "WotC appears to be trying to change things, but it keeps stumbling, and it's often the fans who pick up the pieces. [...] WotC is trying to make changes, but it often feels like lip service. [...] The loudest voices criticizing D&D right now are doing it out of love. They don't want to see it destroyed, they want it to change with the times". However, in 2022, academic Christopher Ferguson stated that the game "was not associated with greater ethnocentrism (one facet of racism) attitudes" after he conducted a survey study of 308 adults (38.2% non-White, and 17% Dungeons and Dragons players). Ferguson concluded that Wizards of the Coast may be responding to a moral panic similar to that surrounding Satanism in the 1990s. In the 2024 update to 5e, character "race" (such as dwarf, elf, or human) was changed to "species."

Between November and December 2022, there was reported speculation that Wizards was planning to discontinue the Open Game License for Dungeons & Dragons based on unconfirmed leaks. Following an initial response to the speculation by Wizards in November 2022, the company released limited details on the update to the OGL in December 2022. Linda Codega, writing for Io9, reported on the details from a leaked full copy of the OGL 1.1 on January 5, 2023. Codega highlighted that "every single licensed publisher will be affected by the new agreement. [...] The main takeaway from the leaked OGL 1.1 draft document is that WotC is keeping power close at hand". ICv2 commented that the leaked OGL had several controversial parts. Following this leak, numerous news and industry-focused outlets reported on negative reactions from both fans and professional content creators. (Note: Such as:Financial Times, Vice, The Guardian, CNBC, NME, IGN, ICv2, Inverse and ComicBook.com.)

TheStreet highlighted that "the company's main competitors" quickly pivoted away from the OGL in the time it took Wizards to settle on a response. Starburst commented that "historically when the owners of Dungeons and Dragons attempt to restrict what people can do with the game, it leads to a boom in other tabletop roleplaying games. This is happening right now". TheStreet also commented that Wizards united its "entire player base" against it; both TheStreet and Io9 highlighted the movement to boycott D&D Beyond and mass subscription cancellations with Io9 stating that the "immediate financial consequences" forced a response by Wizards. Io9 reported that Wizards' internal messaging on the response to the leak was this was a fan overreaction. In the ensuing weeks, Wizards walked back changes to the OGL and solicited public feedback (Note: OGL1.2, with an open feedback period, was announced on January 13, 2023.) before pivoting away from the OGL to release the System Reference Document 5.1 (SRD 5.1) under an irrevocable creative commons license (CC BY 4.0). (Note: System Reference Document 5.1 was announced and became effective immediately on January 27, 2023. Additionally, Wizards announced it would no longer pursue deauthorizing the OGL1.0a.) Edwin Evans-Thirlwell of The Washington Post wrote that "pushback from fans, who criticized WotC's response as far from an apology and a dismissal of their legitimate concerns, led WotC to backpedal further" and that the company "appears to have committed an irreversible act of self-sabotage in trying to replace [the OGL] — squandering the prestige accumulated over 20 years in a matter of weeks". Both Io9 and ComicBook.com called the major concessions – releasing the SRD 5.1 under the creative commons and no longer deauthorizing the OGL1.0a – announced by Wizards a "huge victory" for the Dungeons & Dragons community.

== Legacy and influence ==
Dungeons & Dragons was the first modern role-playing game and it established many of the conventions that have dominated the genre. Particularly notable are the use of dice as a game mechanic, character record sheets, use of numerical attributes, and gamemaster-centered group dynamics. Within months of the release of Dungeons & Dragons, new role-playing game writers and publishers began releasing their own role-playing games, with most of these being in the fantasy genre. Some of the earliest other role-playing games inspired by D&D include Tunnels & Trolls (1975), Empire of the Petal Throne (1975), and Chivalry & Sorcery (1976). The game's commercial success was a factor that led to lawsuits regarding the distribution of royalties between original creators Gygax and Arneson. Gygax later became embroiled in a political struggle for control of TSR which culminated in a court battle and Gygax's decision to sell his ownership interest in the company in 1985.

The role-playing movement initiated by D&D would lead to the release of the science fiction game Traveller (1977), the fantasy game RuneQuest (1978), and subsequent game systems such as Chaosium's Call of Cthulhu (1981), Champions (1982), GURPS (1986), and Vampire: The Masquerade (1991). Dungeons & Dragons and the games it influenced fed back into the genre's origin – miniatures wargames – with combat strategy games like Warhammer Fantasy Battles. D&D also had a large impact on modern video games.

Director Jon Favreau credits Dungeons & Dragons with giving him "... a really strong background in imagination, storytelling, understanding how to create tone and a sense of balance." ND Stevenson and the crew of She-Ra and the Princesses of Power were strongly influenced by Dungeons & Dragons, with Stevenson calling it basically a D&D campaign, with Adora, Glimmer, and Bow falling into "specific classes in D&D". A D&D campaign held among id Software staff in the early 1990s featured a demonic invasion, a warrior named Quake and a magic item named Daikatana. John Romero has credited the campaign with inspiring many of his video games of the era, including Doom, Quake and Daikatana.

=== Actual play ===
In 2020, Sarah Whitten of CNBC stated that the resurgence of Dungeons & Dragons began with the release of the new 5th Edition in 2014 which intersected with the "Let's Play" genre of online videos. Actual play web series and podcasts, such as The Adventure Zone (2014), Critical Role (2015), and Dimension 20 (2018), have been credited as a key part of the game's growth. In 2024, Time stated that "as D&D has evolved from a fringe hobby into a mainstream medium, the idea of people watching others play the tabletop game instead of playing themselves has exploded on a similar track", noting that some shows have sold out stadium performances. Academic Emma French, in Real Life in Real Time: Live Streaming Culture (2023), commented on the impact of actual play on the broader Dungeons & Dragons gaming culture – "actual play media circumvents D&D's insulated or exclusionary aspects, skewing away from 'basement dwelling nerds' in favor of a networked, global fandom. Live streaming is now a means of introducing individuals to the game, bringing it into the mainstream at a time when other geek pursuits have also achieved wider visibility and popularity". According to Hasbro CEO Brian Goldner, viewers on Twitch and YouTube spent over 150 million hours watching D&D gameplay in 2020. French highlighted that in 2020 "no actual play live streams hosted by the official DnD channel featured an all-male cast—showing a massive shift from the brand ambassadors endorsed by Wizards of the Coast" previously.

Curtis D. Carbonell, in the 2019 book Dread Trident: Tabletop Role-Playing Games and the Modern Fantastic, wrote: "Negative association with earlier niche 'nerd' culture have reversed. 5e has become inclusive in its reach of players, after years of focusing on a white, male demographic. [...] At its simplest, the game system now encourages different types of persons to form a party not just to combat evil [...] but to engage in any number of adventure scenarios". French argued that not only has the more accessible and inclusive actual play landscape impacted the gaming culture but it has also impacted the Dungeons & Dragons product itself from the promotion campaign of Tasha's Cauldron of Everything featuring "diverse nerd celebrities" to "direct action taken against previous exclusionary behavior" as seen in Wizards of the Coast statements on diversity and Dungeons & Dragons. French wrote, "as actual play live streams broaden the range of customers that D&D can market itself to, it may enact real, seismic change to the mainstream perception of geek identity, and contribute to a push for diverse representation within geek subculture as a whole".

== In other media ==
D&D's commercial success has led to many other related products, including Dragon and Dungeon magazines, an animated television series, a film series, an off-Broadway stage production, an official role-playing soundtrack, novels, both ongoing and limited series licensed comics, and numerous computer and video games. Hobby and toy stores sell dice, miniatures, adventures, and other game aids related to D&D and its game offspring.

In November 2023, Hasbro's Entertainment One launched the Dungeons & Dragons Adventures FAST channel, available on platforms such as Amazon Freevee and Plex, which features new actual play web series, reruns of the animated Dungeons & Dragons series, and reruns of other Dungeons & Dragons web series.

== In popular culture ==
D&D grew in popularity through the late 1970s and 1980s. Numerous games, films, and cultural references based on D&D or D&D-like fantasies, characters or adventures have been ubiquitous since the end of the 1970s. D&D players are (sometimes pejoratively) portrayed as the epitome of geekdom, and have become the basis of much geek and gamer humor and satire.

Famous D&D players include Pulitzer Prize-winning author Junot Díaz, professional basketball player Tim Duncan, comedian Stephen Colbert, and actors Vin Diesel and Robin Williams.

== See also ==
- D&D Championship Series

== Bibliography ==
- Allston, Aaron (1992). Wrath of the Immortals. TSR. ISBN 1-56076-412-0.
- Appelcline, Shannon (2006). "Chaosium: 1975–present". A Brief History of Game. RPGnet. Archived from the original on January 28, 2021.
- Arneson, Dave (June–July 1979). "My Life and Role Playing". Different Worlds #3. Chaosium: 6–9.
- Birnbaum, Jon (July 20, 2004). "Gary Gygax Interview". Game Banshee. Archived from the original on February 3, 2009. Archived copy of the article, taken 2009-07-13, page 2
- Bledsaw, Bob (July 1979). "From the Sorcerer's Scroll: What has Judges Guild done for Dungeons and Dragons". The Dragon #27. IV (1). TSR Hobbies: 10–11.
- Boucher, Geoff (May 5, 2008). "Jon Favreau is the action figure behind 'Iron Man'". Los Angeles Times. Archived from the original on May 16, 2008.
- Briggs, Jerry (November 30, 1997). "Duncan's unusual hobby and more unusual request". San Antonio Express-News (Texas).
- Cardwell, Paul Jr. (1994). "The Attacks on Role-Playing Games". Skeptical Inquirer. 18 (2): 157–165. Archived from the original on October 12, 2016.
- Carter, Michele; et al. (2007). Wizards Presents Races and Classes. Wizards of the Coast. ISBN 978-0-7869-4801-7.
- Cohen, David X.; Keeler, Ken; Rogers, Eric (writers) (May 5, 2005). Futurama, Anthology of Interest I (Television production). 20th Century Fox Television.
- Cook, Monte; Williams, Skip; Tweet, Jonathan (2003) [2000]. Dungeon Master's Guide v.3.5. revised by David Noonan, Rich Redman. Wizards of the Coast. ISBN 0-7869-2889-1.
- Cook, Monte. "The Open Game License as I See It, Part II". montecook.com. Archived from the original on April 17, 2007.
- Currell, Latasha (September 1, 2004). "Dungeons and Dragons—30 Years and Going Strong". The Golden Gate [X]Press Online. The Journalism Department @ San Francisco State University. Archived from the original on November 4, 2004.
- Dancey, Ryan (February 7, 2000). "Adventure Game Industry Market Research Summary (RPGs)". Wizards of the Coast. V1.0. Archived from the original on March 12, 2023.
- Darlington, Steven (August 1998). "A History of Role-Playing Part IV: Part Four: Hell and High Finance". Places to Go, People to be (4). Archived from the original on February 22, 2007.
- Darlington, Steven (November 1998). "A History of Role-Playing Part V: The Power and the Glory". Places to Go, People to be (5). Archived from the original on February 22, 2007.
- Darlington, Steven (June 1999). "A History of Role-Playing Part VIII: Dark Times". Places to Go, People to be (8). Archived from the original on February 22, 2007.
- Darlington, Steven (August 1999). "A History of Role-Playing Part IX: The End and The Beginning". Places to Go, People to be (9). Archived from the original on April 30, 2007.
- Drout, Michael D. C. (2007). J.R.R. Tolkien Encyclopedia: Scholarship and Critical Assessment. New York: Routledge. ISBN 978-0-415-96942-0.
- Cook, David (1989b). Player's Handbook. TSR. ISBN 0-88038-716-5.
- Cook, David (1995) [1989b]. Player's Handbook (Revised ed.). TSR. ISBN 0-7869-0329-5.
- DeVarque, Aardy R. "Literary Sources of D&D". Rec.games.frp.dnd FAQs. Archived from the original on December 9, 2007.
- Fine, Gary Alan (2002). Shared Fantasy: Role Playing Games as Social Worlds. New York: University of Chicago Press. ISBN 0-226-24944-1.
- Gagne, Kenneth A. (April 27, 2001). "Moral Panics Over Youth Culture and Video Games". Worcester Polytechnic Institute. Archived from the original on July 4, 2021.
- Grady, RJ (August 4, 2004). "In Genre: THE DUNGEON". RPGnet. Archived from the original on February 12, 2007.
- Grigg, Robert (June 16–20, 2005). "Albert Goes Narrative Contracting". DiGRA 2005 Papers. Vancouver, British Columbia, Canada: Simon Fraser University.
- Gygax, Gary (1979). Dungeon Masters Guide. TSR. ISBN 0-935696-02-4.
- Gygax, Gary (April 1976). "The Dungeons and Dragons Magic System". The Strategic Review. II (2). TSR Hobbies.
- Gygax, Gary; Arneson, Dave (1974). Dungeons & Dragons (3-Volume Set). TSR.
- Gygax, Gary (December 1978). "Dungeons & Dragons: What Is It and Where Is It Going?". The Dragon #21. III (8). TSR: 29–30. ISSN 1062-2101.
- Gygax, Gary (June 1979). "From the Sorcerer's Scroll: D&D, AD&D and Gaming". The Dragon #26. III (12). TSR Hobbies: 28–30. ISSN 1062-2101.
- Gygax, Gary. "Gygax FAQ". The Creative World of Gary Gygax. Archived from the original on January 28, 1999.
- Gygax, Gary (1977). Monster Manual. TSR. ISBN 0-935696-00-8.
- Gygax, Gary (March 1985). "On the influence of J.R.R. Tolkien on the D&D and AD&D games". Dragon #95. IX (10). TSR Hobbies, Inc.: 12–13. ISSN 0279-6848.
- Gygax, Gary (1978). Player's Handbook. TSR. ISBN 0-935696-01-6.
- Hallford, N.; Hallford, J. (2001). Swords & Circuitry: A Designer's Guide to Computer Role Playing Games (1st ed.). Thomson Course Technology PTR. p. 39. ISBN 0-7615-3299-4.
- Hately, Shaun (February 1999). "The Disappearance of James Dallas Egbert III (Part I)". Places to Go, People to be (6). Archived from the original on April 13, 2021.
- Heinsoo, Rob; Collins, Andy; Wyatt, James (2008). Player's Handbook. Wizards of the Coast. ISBN 978-0-7869-4867-3.
- Hite, Kenneth (March 30, 2006). "State of the Industry 2005: Another Such Victory Will Destroy Us". GamingReport.com. Archived from the original on February 4, 2009.
- Johnson, Harold; et al. (2004). 30 Years of Adventure: A Celebration of Dungeons & Dragons. Wizards of the Coast. ISBN 0-7869-3498-0.
- Kuntz, Rob (April 1978). "Tolkien in Dungeons & Dragons". The Dragon #13. II (7). TSR Hobbies, Inc.
- Kushner, David (March 10, 2008). "Dungeon Master: The Life and Legacy of Gary Gygax". Wired.com. Archived from the original on November 13, 2012.
- Leckart, Steven (June 26, 2007). "Ratatouille Star Patton Oswalt on Geeks vs. Nerds". Wired. Vol. 15, no. 7. Archived from the original on June 23, 2013.
- McCuen, Mike (2002). "15mm Battlesystem Paladin 1994". Small Obsessions. Archived from the original on June 8, 2007.
- Mead, Lawrence; Malcomson, Ian (2003). "Dungeons & Dragons FAQ". Wizards of the Coast. Archived from the original on August 18, 2000.
- Mentzer, Frank (1984). Dungeons & Dragons (Set 3: Companion Rules). TSR. ISBN 0-88038-340-2.
- Mentzer, Frank (1986). Dungeons & Dragons (Set 5: Immortal Rules). TSR. ISBN 0-88038-341-0.
- Mohan, Kim (1986). Wilderness Survival Guide. TSR. ISBN 0-88038-291-0.
- Moore, Jeff. "15mm Scale Fantasy Figures". Humberside Wargames Society. Archived from the original on April 6, 2007.
- Mythmere. "Castles & Crusades Players Handbook (4.6 stars)". Mythmere's Wondrous Resource. Archived from the original on June 12, 2006.
- O'Connor, John (December 28, 1982). "TV: 'Mazes and Monsters,' Fantasy". The New York Times. Archived from the original on November 24, 2007.
- Pope, Thomas (March 25, 2004). "Grenadier Models, Advanced Dungeons and Dragons". The Stuff of Legends. Archived from the original on February 4, 2007.
- Pope, Thomas (February 27, 2000). "Ral Partha". The Stuff of Legends. Archived from the original on February 8, 2007.
- Pope, Thomas (November 5, 1999). "TSR". The Stuff of Legends. Archived from the original on July 28, 2024.
- Pramas, Chris (July 14, 2008). "Green Ronin and Fourth Edition D&D". Green Ronin. Archived from the original on December 10, 2008.
- Pryor, Tony; Herring, Tony; Tweet, Jonathan; Richie, Norm (1993). Creative Campaigning. TSR. ISBN 1-56076-561-5.
- Rausch, Allen (August 19, 2004). "Dave Arneson Interview". GameSpy. Archived from the original on April 20, 2016.
- Rilstone, Andrew (1994). "Role-Playing Games: An Overview". The Oracle. Archived from the original on August 23, 2000.
- Schend, Steven E.; Pickens, Jon; Watry, Dori, eds. (1991). Rules Cyclopedia. TSR. ISBN 1-56076-085-0.
- Schick, Lawrence (1991). Heroic Worlds: A History and Guide to Role-Playing Games. Amherst, New York: Prometheus Books. ISBN 0-87975-653-5 – via Internet Archive.
- Scott, Richard. "Otherworld, The Citadel AD&D Miniatures Range". Otherworld Miniatures. Archived from the original on October 21, 2007.
- Shanafelt, Steve (November 2, 2005). "The growing chic of geek: How turning 30 made Dungeons & Dragons feel young again". Mountain Xpress. 12 (14). Archived from the original on September 27, 2007.
- Simon, Armando (October 1987). "Emotional Stability Pertaining to Dungeons and Dragons". Psychology in the Schools. 24 (4): 329–332. doi:10.1002/1520-6807(198710)24:4<329::AID-PITS2310240406>3.0.CO;2-9.
- Slavicsek, Bill; Sernett, Matthew (2006). Dungeons & Dragons Basic Game. Wizards of the Coast. ISBN 0-7869-3944-3.
- Slavicsek, Bill; Baker, Richard (2005). Dungeons & Dragons for Dummies. Wiley Publishing. ISBN 0-7645-8459-6.
- Svensson, Peter (July 21, 2008). "Dungeons & Dragons reborn". Associated Press. Archived from the original on August 22, 2008.
- Svitavsky, William (June 2001). "Geek Culture: An Annotated Interdisciplinary Bibliography". The Bulletin of Bibliography. 58 (2): 101–108. Archived from the original on August 28, 2008.
- Thorn, Mike (June 9, 2006). "Review of Hackmaster 4th Edition". RPGnet. Archived from the original on September 30, 2007.
- Tonjes, Wayne (October 19, 2005). "Interview with Charles Ryan on the 2005 Worldwide Dungeons & Dragons Game Day". Gaming Report. Archived from the original on February 21, 2009.
- Tweet, Jonathan (2004). Dungeons & Dragons Basic Game. Wizards of the Coast. ISBN 0-7869-3409-3.
- Tweet, Jonathan; Cook, Monte; Williams, Skip (2000). Player's Handbook. Wizards of the Coast. ISBN 0-7869-1550-1.
- Tweet, Jonathan; Cook, Monte; Williams, Skip (2003) [2000]. Player's Handbook v.3.5. revised by Collins, Andy. Wizards of the Coast. ISBN 0-7869-2886-7.
- Tweet, Jonathan (May 20, 2004). "What Are D&D Miniatures?". Wizards of the Coast. Archived from the original on June 6, 2004.
- Waldron, David (Spring 2005). "Role-Playing Games and the Christian Right: Community Formation in Response to a Moral Panic". Journal of Religion and Popular Culture. IX. Department of Religious Studies and Anthropology, The University of Saskatchewan. Archived from the original on February 4, 2012.
- Ward, James M. (February 1990). "The Games Wizards: Angry Mothers From Heck (And what we do about them)". Dragon Magazine #154. XIV (9): 9. ISSN 0279-6848.
- Waskul, Dennis; Lust, Matt (2004). "Role-Playing and Playing Roles: The Person, Player, and Persona in Fantasy Role-Playing" (PDF). Caliber. 27 (3): 222–256. doi:10.1525/si.2004.27.3.333. Archived from the original (PDF) on December 4, 2012.
- Waters, Darren (April 26, 2004). "What happened to Dungeons and Dragons?". BBC News Online. Archived from the original on December 27, 2019.
- Williams, J. P.; Hendricks, S. Q.; Winkler, W. K. (2006). Williams, J. Patrick; Hendricks, Sean Q.; Winkler, W. Keith (eds.). Gaming as Culture, Essays on Reality, Identity and Experience in Fantasy Games. McFarland & Company: Oxford University Press. ISBN 0-7864-2436-2.
- Williams, Skip (1995). Dungeon Master Option: High Level Campaigns. TSR. ISBN 0-7869-0168-3.
- Williams, Skip; Tweet, Jonathan; Cook, Monte (2000). Monster Manual. Wizards of the Coast. ISBN 0-7869-1552-8.

Unknown author

- "Archive of List of Origins Award Winners". Academy of Adventure Gaming Arts and Design. 2006. Archived from the original on January 25, 2007. – select year on right of page.
- "Hall of Fame". Academy of Adventure Gaming Arts and Design. 2006. Archived from the original on June 26, 2007.
- "List of Winners". Academy of Adventure Gaming Arts & Design. 2001. Archived from the original on August 30, 2007.
- "Hall of Fame". Games Magazine Online. 2007. Archived from the original on August 12, 2007.
- "Dungeon Crawl Classics". Goodman Games. Archived from the original on March 24, 2007.
- "D20 Products with 3rd Edition Rules, 1st Edition Feel". Necromancer Games. 2007. Archived from the original on August 7, 2007.
- "Paizo Publishing Announces the Pathfinder RPG". Paizo Publishing. March 18, 2008. Archived from the original on December 6, 2008.
- "How Dungeon & Dragons shaped the modern videogame". PC Gamer. Future Publishing Limited. February 8, 2007. Archived from the original on May 27, 2007.
- "The d20 System". Wizards of the Coast. Archived from the original on February 3, 2004.
- "Dungeons & Dragons Flashes 4-ward at Gen Con" (PDF). Wizards of the Coast. August 16, 2007. Archived from the original (PDF) on November 28, 2007.
- "The History of TSR". Wizards of the Coast. Archived from the original on September 24, 2008.
- "What Is D&D?". Wizards of the Coast. Archived from the original on November 12, 2005.
- "Wizards of the Coast at Gen Con!". Wizards of the Coast. 2007. Archived from the original on August 20, 2007.
- "Mike Myers". Inside the Actors' Studio. Season 7. Episode 9. February 4, 2001.
- "Countdown to 3rd Edition: Feats and Fighters". Dragon #270. XXIV (11). Wizards of the Coast: 30–31. April 2000. ISSN 1062-2101.
- "Interview with Dave Arneson". Pegasus (1). Judges Guild. April–May 1981. Archived from the original on March 21, 2009.
- Rouchart, Sandy; Aylett, Ruth (2003). "Solving the Narrative Paradox in VEs — Lessons from RPGs". In Rist, Thomas (ed.). Intelligent Virtual Agents: 4th International Workshop. Springer. ISBN 978-3-540-20003-1.
