= H.P. Lovecraft's Dreamlands =

Tabletop fantasy role-playing game supplement

Roleplaying Beyond the World of Sleep
- Cover Illustration by Raymond Bayless.
- Designers: Sandy Petersen; Kerie Campbell; Jeff Okamoto; Keith Herber; Richard T. Launius; Mark Morrison; Phil Frances
- Publishers: Chaosium
- Publication: 1986 1st edition (boxed set); 1992 2nd edition; 1997 3rd edition; 2004 4th edition; 2008 5th edition
- Genres: Fantasy
- Systems: Basic Role-Playing
- ISBN: 1-56882-157-3

H.P. Lovecraft's Dreamlands is a fantasy tabletop role-playing supplement published by Chaosium in 1986 for the horror role-playing game Call of Cthulhu that features six adventures set in the world of H.P. Lovecraft's Dream cycle stories. There have been 5 editions.

== Contents ==
H.P. Lovecraft's Dreamlands is a 136-page perfect-bound softcover book with three pages of color plates and a large two-color fold-out map. It was designed by Sandy Petersen, Keith Herber, K. L. Campbell, Scott Clegg, Richard T. Launius, Mark Morrison, Phil Frances, Lynn Willis, Susan Hutchinson, Jacqueline Clegg, and Jeff Okamoto. The color plates were created by Tom Sullivan and Mark Roland, and the cover art was by Raymond Bayless.

The book contains six adventures for Call of Cthulhu that are based on some of the early fantasy stories written by H. P. Lovecraft such as The Dream-Quest of Unknown Kadath, Celephaïs, and The Cats of Ulthar. These adventures enable adventures in the mysterious alternate reality called the Dreamlands.

The book also contains two new skills that can only be used in the Dreamlands, as well as a compendium of creatures that inhabitant that reality.

The adventures are:

- To Sleep, Perchance to Dream, an introduction to the Dreamlands
- Captives of the Two Worlds, which provides the Dreamlands as a potential source of information during normal investigations
- Pickman's Student allows the Investigators to travel between reality and the Dreamlands again
- Season of the Witch involves a long-dead witch who has existed in the Dreamlands, waiting for a chance to strike back
- Lemon Sails takes Investigators on a quest to aid someone in the Dreamlands
- The Land of Lost Dreams forces Investigators to confront their worst nightmares

== Reception ==
In the August-September 1987 edition of Space Gamer/Fantasy Gamer (No. 79), Guy Hail gave a thumbs up, saying, "Beyond the adventures, Dreamlands opens up a vast new area of role-playing potential."

Scott D. Aniolowski reviewed H.P. Lovecraft's Dreamlands: Roleplaying Beyond the Wall of Sleep for Different Worlds magazine and stated that "H.P. Lovecraft's Dreamlands is probably the best and longest-awaited-for supplement to the Call Of Cthulhu system to date and is a must for any Keeper serious about expanding his Cthulhu universe 'Beyond the Wall of Sleep'! Finally we Call Of Cthulhu players can experience that fantastic world that Randolph Carter so often visited, and playing a few sessions in that hazy, dreamy world will make you understand why Carter so loved it. This supplement pack is highly recommended and will be enjoyed by fans of Cthulhu and fantasy gaming alike."

In the June 1990 edition of Dragon (Issue 158), Jim Bambra was enthusiastic about this book, saying that it "greatly expands the options available to Keepers. Its resemblance to a fantasy world allows Keepers to let their Investigators enjoy a change of pace and emphasis." He concluded with a strong recommendation: "Rather than merely dwell on its fantastic aspect, the adventure authors have expertly integrated the horror of COC with the strange dream reality. Dreamlands is yet another great COC supplement."

== Reviews ==
Backstab #49

== See also ==
- S. Petersen's Field Guide to Creatures of the Dreamlands
