= Raymond Bayless =

Raymond Gordon Bayless (1920 – May 25, 2004) was an American artist, author and parapsychologist.

== Biography ==
Bayless was born in Oakland, California. As a teenager he worked in book and magazine illustration. He later became an artist and landscape painter specialising in oil paintings. Bayless did not graduate from college, but instead became a self-taught artist and illustrator. Bayless had a picture of a rainbow displayed in a 1968 exhibition at Barnsdall Park. In article from 1974 in the magazine Southwest Art commented that: "The art of Raymond Bayless is in many ways an excursion into the past; a voyage back to the romantic era of the Hudson River artists; the painterly world of the great Dutch landscape masters, and the famed school of the English landscape painters. It has been frequently remarked that to view his paintings is to view the works of a living 'old master.' Though reflecting much of the aura of the past both in technique and in atmosphere, Bayless' paintings still are very much of the present and near present and many illustrate the varied moods of the American West. His pictures cover a large range of size; the smallest about two by three inches and the largest a panoramic scene measuring three by five feet. And interestingly, the degree of detail displayed in the larger works is close to that found in the smaller paintings. The subject matter of Bayless' paintings extends from that appropriate to still life to immense vistas of hills and townlets, groves of trees and expanses of fields, all melting into a haze in the distant horizon."

He is also known for his science fiction fantasy paintings and drawings some of which were featured as cover arts on fantasy fiction books such as his Cthulhu artwork. His artwork was included in the role-playing game supplement H.P. Lovecraft's Dreamlands.

Bayless also provided paintings to the American government contributing paintings of ships and landscapes to the Air Force, Navy, State Department and the Pentagon. By the end of his career, Bayless had paintings hanging in the National Air and Space Museum, the State Department, and The Pentagon.

== Parapsychology ==
Bayless was a parapsychologist and psychic investigator, he wrote numerous books dealing with a variety of paranormal topics. Bayless said that when he was twelve years old he witnessed a levitating sewing machine, and was thereafter drawn to parapsychology to find out why things like that happen. Bayless later built an amplifying system with a medium named Attila von Szalay to listen to what they believed were sounds made by the dead.

His first book was The Enigma of the Poltergeist, which Matt Weinstock of the Los Angeles Times said "adds considerably to the lore of psychic phenomena but admittedly offers no solution to the mystery of falling stones, self-starting fires, noises, voices, disappearing objects and things that go bump in the night. Personal investigation of strange happenings is an avocation for Bayless, a professional artist." Raymond Buckland in 2005 wrote about how Bayless and Rogo wrote the book "after a two-year investigation into phantom phone calls. The authors were surprised to find that a large number of people had received phone calls from friends and relatives who had died. In some cases the call was received before the recipient knew of the death of the caller. In other cases, the caller was long deceased. In 1956, Bayless became interested in the work of Attila von Szalay, who had done extensive work on spirit voices. The two worked together and in 1959 published their initial findings in The Journal of the American Society for Psychical Research."

He is most well known for his book written with D. Scott Rogo titled Phone Calls From The Dead (1979) in which they describe an alleged paranormal phenomenon in which people report that they receive simple, brief, and usually single-occurrence telephone calls from spirits of deceased relatives, friends, or strangers. Susan L. Nickerson for Library Journal in 1979 wrote that "There is something very humorous in the idea of the dead contacting us by telephone, but Rogo and Bayless are quite serious about their two-year investigation, the first systematic study in a field that most parapsychologists have evidently laughed away. The author's compilation of cases and their attempts towards an explanation are impressive. They also give some background on other attempts to communicate with the dead by electronic means. Although they try to report objectively, a certain bias toward belief in survival after death is evident. For parapsychology collections."

The book The Spiritual Anatomy of Emotion notes that Bayless in 1980 covered a case in which he inferred a mechanism for how auroral sounds can become audible: the phone and paging systems in a factory would stop working or become drowned out by high-frequency sound in the presence of a young female worker, which also caused malfunctions in her electric typewriter and calculator, and the tape recorder of Bayless. Bayless noted that another worker had experienced similar conditions there a year earlier so Bayless thought that the two women "modulated radio waves into a form that could be picked up physically on electronic equipment."

Bayless also co-wrote The Case for Life After Death: Parapsychologists Look at the Evidence (1981) with Elizabeth E. McAdams, of which Library Journal reviewer Michael Schuyler said "Despite the promise of the title, this book is merely a collection of anecdotal material including out-of-body experiences, ghosts, animal hauntings, mysterious telephone calls, and the like. These accounts span the last 100 years, with many of the cases comfortably out of reach of verification. Most have been reported elsewhere in parapsychological literature. The subject deserves serious treatment, but this book does little to further research in the area. There is nothing new here." George P. Hansen of the Journal of Parapsychology said that "This is a popularly written book meant for persons with no previous familiarity with psychical research. The topics include near-death experiences, ghosts, poltergeists, OBEs, tape-recorded voice phenomena, spirit photography, mediumistic communications, and others. The book is primarily a collection of cases recounted in three or four sentences to a page or two. It contains a fair list of references for a book of its scope. The book will probably not be of any interest to persons even slightly familiar with the literature. A very credulous tone is adopted; for instance, Margery and ectoplasm are both accepted as legitimate without adequate indication of the extremely controversial nature of both. The reader is not given much guidance as to care required in investigations of psychical research. It cannot be recommended because of the credulous approach."

His wife Marjorie said that before he died in 2004, he told her he would return.

== Published works ==
- The Enigma of the Poltergeist (1967)
- Animal Ghosts (1970)
- Experiences of a Psychical Researcher (1972)
- Other Side of Death (1972)
- Voices from Beyond (1976)
- Phone Calls from the Dead (1979) with D. Scott Rogo
- The Case for Life After Death: Parapsychologists Look at the Evidence (1981) with Elizabeth E. McAdams
- Apparitions and Survival of Death (1989)
