= S. Petersen's Field Guide to Cthulhu Monsters =

Tabletop horror role-playing game supplement

A Field Observer's Handbook Of Preternatural Entities
- Cover art by Tom Sullivan
- Designers: Sandy Petersen; Lynn Willis
- Illustrators: Lisa Free; Ron Leming; Tom Sullivan
- Publishers: Chaosium
- Publication: 1988; 38 years ago
- Genres: Horror
- Systems: Systemless
- ISBN: 978-0933635487

S. Petersen's Field Guide to Cthulhu Monsters, subtitled "A Field Observer's Handbook of Preternatural Entities"", is a supplement published by Chaosium in 1989 for the horror role-playing game Call of Cthulhu, itself based on the works of H.P. Lovecraft.

== Contents ==
S. Petersen's Field Guide to Cthulhu Monsters is a bestiary of creatures that were first imagined by H.P. Lovecraft. Each entry features a color illustration of each creature facing a description of the creature, a quote from Lovecraft, an outline of the creature, and its habitat, how common it is, and how it lives and its habits.

The book is written in an "in-universe" style, as if it were a volume that a character within a Call of Cthulhu game might have come across in a library or personal book collection; as such, the descriptions do not include any game mechanics, furthering the in-universe conceit. This also allows the creatures to be adapted to any role-playing game system.

== Publication history ==
Chaosium first published the horror role-playing game Call of Cthulhu in 1981, and when it proved very popular, many adventures and sourcebooks followed. In 1988, Chaosium published S. Petersen's Field Guide to Cthulhu Monsters, a 64-page perfect-bound softcover book written by Sandy Petersen, Lynn Willis, and Tom Sullivan, with additional contributions by Peter Dannseys, E.C. Fallworth, L.N. Isinwyll, and Ivan Mustoli, with illustrations by Lisa Free, Ron Leming, and Tom Sullivan.

The following year, Chaosium published a sister volume, S. Petersen's Field Guide to Creatures of the Dreamlands.

== Reception ==
In the October 1988 edition of Dragon (Issue #138), Ken Rolston called this "a useful game reference" that "manages to take itself fairly seriously while maintaining an atmosphere of fun." Rolston called Petersen's writing "a perfect example of Chaosium’s masterful control of tone and diction." He concluded, "This is delicious. Buy several for your best friends and hope that some day the gaming hobby will produce works of equal charm to describe monstrous species for other fantasy and science-fiction role-playing settings."

In Issue 45 of Abyss (Spring 1990), Dave Nalle was impressed, writing, "The art is phenomenal, the descriptions of the creatures are excellent ... The text is intelligent and informative." The only faults Nalle could find were the high price ($15), and the inclusion of creatures from outside of Lovecraft's works; the Hounds of Tindalos and Ithaqua were two examples. Nalle concluded by recommending this book "if you can afford the price and like the idea of full-color illustrations of unearthly horrors beyond the scope of man's natural; perceptive ability."

== Awards ==
S. Petersen's Field Guide to Cthulhu Monsters was awarded the Origins Award for "Best Graphic Presentation of a Roleplaying Game, Adventure, or Supplement of 1988".
