= 1989 Origins Award winners =

The following are the winners of the 16th annual (1989) Origins Award, presented at Origins 1990:

| Category | Winner | Company | Designer(s) |
|---|---|---|---|
| Best Historical Figure Series of 1989 | Aztecs, 25mm | Falcon Miniatures | |
| Best Fantasy or Science Fiction Figure Series of 1989 | Dragonlance Heroes Line | Ral Partha | Dennis Mize, Tom Meier, Richard Kerr |
| Best Vehicular Miniatures Series of 1989 | Battle Tech Mechs and Vehicles | Ral Partha | |
| Best Accessory Figure Series of 1989 | Mighty Fortress (for Warhammer) | Games Workshop | Citadel Plastics Team |
| Best Miniatures Rules of 1989 | Battlesystem Miniatures Rules | TSR | |
| Best Roleplaying Rules of 1989 | Advanced Dungeons & Dragons 2nd Edition | TSR | |
| Best Roleplaying Adventure of 1989 | The Great Old Ones (for Call of Cthulhu) | Chaosium | Harry Cleaver, Doug Lyons, Marcus L Roland, Kevin A Ross, Tom Sullivan, Lynn Willis |
| Best Roleplaying Supplement of 1989 | Creatures of the Dreamlands (for Call of Cthulhu) – | Chaosium | Mark Ferrari, Sandy Petersen, Lynn Willis |
| Best Graphic Presentation of a Roleplaying Game, Adventure, or Supplement of 1989 | Creatures of the Dreamlands | Chaosium | Mark Ferrari, Tom Sullivan, Lynn Willis |
| Best Pre-20th Century Boardgame of 1989 | A House Divided | Game Designers Workshop | Frank Chadwick |
| Best Modern-Day Boardgame of 1989 | Red Storm Rising | TSR | Douglas Niles |
| Best Fantasy or Science Fiction Boardgame of 1989 | Space Hulk | Games Workshop | Richard Halliwell |
| Best Graphic Presentation of a Boardgame of 1989 | Red Storm Rising | TSR | |
| Best Play-by-Mail Game of 1989 | It's a Crime | Adventures By Mail | |
| Best New Play-by-Mail Game of 1989 | Beyond the Stellar Empire: The New System | Adventures By Mail | |
| Best Fantasy or Science Fiction Computer Game of 1989 | Curse of the Azure Bonds | Strategic Simulations Inc | |
| Best Military or Strategy Computer Game of 1989 | Sim City | Maxis Will Wright | |
| Best Professional Adventure Gaming Magazine of 1989 | Dragon Magazine | TSR | Barbara Young, editor |
| Best Amateur Adventure Gaming Magazine of 1989 | The Canadian Wargamers Journal | The Canadian Wargamers Group | |
| Adventure Gaming Hall of Fame | Jim Ward | | |
