= Empire (miniatures game) =

Empire is a set of rules for Napoleonic Era miniatures wargames. The first of five editions was published in 1975.

Cover of first edition rulebook, 1975

== Description ==
In 1975, Scott Bowden and Ken Ray wrote Empire, a 58-page softcover book of rules concerning miniatures wargames that was published by Arlington Reproduction. Unlike other wargames of its era, Empire did not focus on one battle or even a series of battles. Instead, the authors sought to set out general rules for miniatures that could be used to enact any battle of the Napoleonic Era.

Content included rules on leader ratings, and troop types, and was the first to also include rules for frontage, range, and maneuverability.

Bowden founded Emperor's Press to produce more miniatures games, and over the years published a number of revised editions of "Empire":

- Second edition, 1977. A 100-page softcover book by Bowden with a plastic binding comb
- Third edition, 1981. A boxed set containing a 176-page rulebook co-authored by Bowden and Jim Getz. New maneuvering rules and concepts such as "Telescoping Time" were introduced.
- Fourth edition, 1989, also co-authored by Bowden and Getz, added more rules concerning tactical reactions to enemy moves.
- Fifth edition, 1990, also by Bowden and Getz, was published in a binder format.

In 1984, Emperor's Press also published Empire Campaign System, a separate game system by Kip Trexel that was designed to add a strategic operational element to the third edition rules.

The Historical Miniatures Gaming Society states that "Empire was the dominant miniatures wargaming rules system during the 1980's, and many original Empire traits are still evident in both historical and non-historical miniature game designs today." A 1979 article in Boys' Life about war games recommended Empire as a good place to start learning about the hobby of Napoleonic Era miniatures games.

== Reception ==
The German website Figuren Miniatures reviewed the third edition of Empire, and noted that this edition introduced many new concepts "to give the wargamer a tool with which to create and accurately simulate historical conflict. In this, Getz and Bowden succeeded on a grand scale." The reviewer was especially impressed by the leader and troop ratings sections, which "are well worth the money of an entire rule set, because they can be used to rate and compare Napoleonic troops regardless of which rules are actually used. Many rules writers overlook the issue of national characteristics [...] So, if in doubt about the training and morale status of a particular Napoleonic troop type, regiment, or elite company [...] Empire is the quickest, most valuable and reliable source." The reviewer warned that the 176-page rulebook would require "a serious investment of time and thought" but concluded that "Empire is the right choice for students of military history interested in a realistic simulation of Napoleonic warfare at the grand-tactical and tactical level."

== Awards ==
At the 1978 Origins Awards, the second edition of Empire won the H.G. Wells Award for All Time Best Napoleonic Rules of 1977, and was also inducted into the H.G. Wells Adventure Gaming Hall of Fame.

In 2007, the Historical Miniatures Gaming Society presented Scott Bowden with their Jack Scruby Award. The award citation delineates all of Bowden's work on various games, but holds up Empire as his pre-eminent achievement.
