= S. Petersen's Field Guide to Creatures of the Dreamlands =

Fantasy tabletop role-playing game supplement

An Album of Entities from The Land Beyond The Wall of Sleep
- Cover by Mark J. Ferrari
- Designers: Sandy Petersen; Mark J. Ferrari; Lynn Willis; Tom Sullivan
- Illustrators: Mark J. Ferrari
- Publishers: Chaosium
- Publication: 1989; 37 years ago
- Genres: Horror fantasy
- Systems: Systemless
- ISBN: 0-933635-53-2

S. Petersen's Field Guide to Creatures of the Dreamlands, subtitled "An Album of Entities from The Land Beyond The Wall of Sleep", is a supplement published by Chaosium in 1989 for the horror role-playing game Call of Cthulhu. It features creatures from the world of H.P. Lovecraft's Dream cycle stories.

== Contents ==
S. Petersen's Field Guide to Creatures of the Dreamlands is a bestiary of creatures that inhabit the Dreamlands, the alternate reality featured in stories of H.P. Lovecraft such as The Dream-Quest of Unknown Kadath, Celephaïs, and The Cats of Ulthar.

Each entry features a color illustration of each creature facing a description of the creature, a quote from Lovecraft, an outline of the creature, and its habitat, how common it is, and how it lives and its habits.

The book is written in an "in-universe" style, as if it were a volume that a character within a Call of Cthulhu game might have come across in a library or personal book collection; as such, the descriptions do not include any game mechanics, furthering the in-universe conceit. This also allows the creatures to be adapted to any role-playing game system.

== Publication history ==
Chaosium first published the horror role-playing game Call of Cthulhu in 1981, and when it proved very popular, many adventures and sourcebooks followed. In 1988, Chaosium published S. Petersen's Field Guide to Cthulhu Monsters which won two Origins Awards. Chaosium followed this in 1989 with S. Petersen's Field Guide to Creatures of the Dreamlands, a 64-page perfect-bound softcover book written by Sandy Petersen, Mark Ferrari, Lynn Willis, and Tom Sullivan, with illustrations by Ferrari.

== Reception ==
In the November 1989 edition of Games International (Issue 10), Mike Jarvis was ambivalent about this product. He admired the colour illustrations, which he called "quite beyond belief, with creatures ranging from the delicate and profoundly beautiful to the stark alien horror more usually associated with H. P. Lovecraft's writing [...] they are truly something special." However, Jarvis questioned the utility of this book, saying "this is of very little use in a Call of Cthulhu campaign." He concluded by giving the book an average rating of 3 out of 5, commenting, "While this is an excellent product with no faults whatsoever, ultimately [it is] merely a book for Lovecraft collectors and Call of Cthulhu completists."

In Issue 45 of Abyss (Spring 1990), Dave Nalle was impressed, writing, "The art is phenomenal, the descriptions of the creatures are excellent ... The text is intelligent and informative." The only faults Nalle could find were the high price ($15), and the inclusion of creatures from outside of Lovecraft's works; Clark Ashton Smith's Tsathogua and Atlach Nacha were two examples. Nalle concluded by recommending this book "if you can afford the price and like the idea of full-color illustrations of unearthly horrors beyond the scope of man's natural; perceptive ability."

Space Gamer/Fantasy Gamer called this "some of the best and most original supplementary material ever published by Chaosium .. the artwork in this book is simply outstanding." The review concluded, "if you are really into this genre, gaming or otherwise, put this review down and go buy Dreamlands. If you only have a passing interest, you could certainly do worse."

In the June 1990 edition of Dragon (Issue 158), Jim Bambra called this book "slickly produced and beautifully illustrated... Best of all are the illustrations by Mark J. Ferrari, which are nothing short of excellent." He concluded with a strong recommendation, saying, "S. Petersen's Field Guide to Creatures of the Dreamlands is a book that anyone who likes excellent artwork should have in their collection. The full-page plates are superb. They are also useful for showing to players as their Investigators encounter these creatures."

== Awards ==
At the 1990 Origins Awards, Creatures of the Dreamlands was named "Best Roleplaying Supplement of 1989" and "Best Graphic Presentation of a Roleplaying Game, Adventure, or Supplement of 1989 ".

== See also ==
- H.P. Lovecraft's Dreamlands
